= Number of U.S. Supreme Court cases decided by year =

This is a list of the number of United States Supreme Court decisions issued by calendar year (Note: This is not the same as the Supreme Court's year-long Term which runs from October to the following September.) as published in the official United States Reports. The third column below lists which of the volumes of the Reports include cases for each calendar year.

== Change from taking all cases to only selected cases ==
Prior to passage of the Judiciary Act of 1925 the Supreme Court reviewed almost all cases sent to it. After 1925, most cases have been subject to being granted a writ of certiorari which the Court can grant or deny without ruling on the merits. This change greatly reduced the Court's workload. In the past decade, approximately 7,000-8,000 new cases are filed in the Supreme Court each year. Plenary review, with oral arguments by attorneys, is granted in about 80 of those cases, and the Court typically disposes of about 100 or more cases without plenary review — fewer than 3% of the total.

== Number of U.S. Supreme Court cases decided by calendar year ==
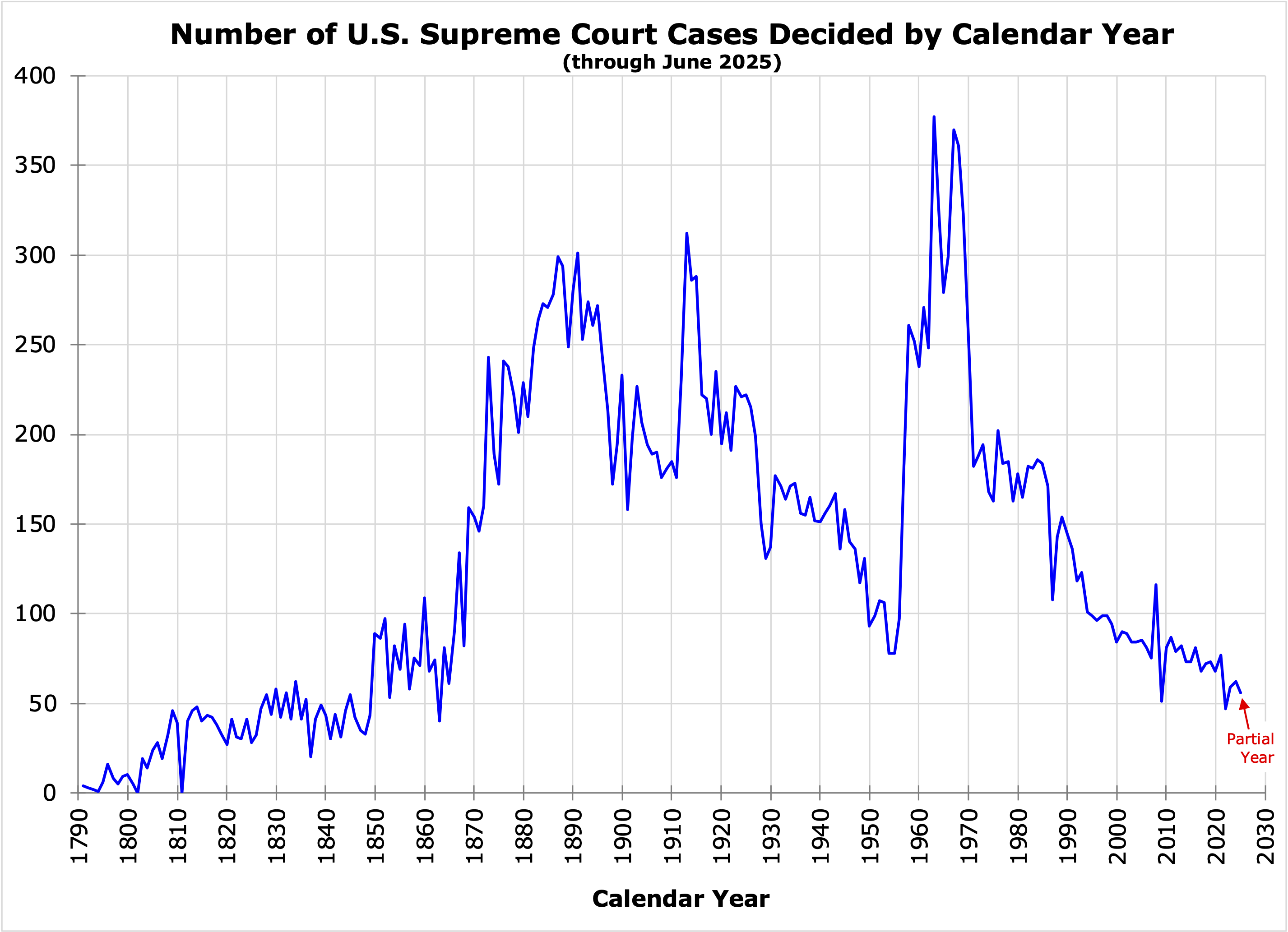
Number of U.S. Supreme Court Cases Decided by Calendar Year

| Year | Cases Decided | United States Reports Volume(s) |
|---|---|---|
| 1791 | 4 | 2 |
| 1792 | 3 | 2 |
| 1793 | 2 | 2 |
| 1794 | 1 | 3 |
| 1795 | 6 | 3 |
| 1796 | 16 | 3 |
| 1797 | 8 | 3 |
| 1798 | 5 | 3 |
| 1799 | 9 | 3, 4 |
| 1800 | 10 | 4 |
| 1801 | 5 | 5 |
| 1802 | 0 | — |
| 1803 | 19 | 5 |
| 1804 | 14 | 6 |
| 1805 | 24 | 6, 7 |
| 1806 | 28 | 7 |
| 1807 | 19 | 8 |
| 1808 | 32 | 8 |
| 1809 | 46 | 9 |
| 1810 | 39 | 10 |
| 1811 | 0 | — |
| 1812 | 40 | 11 |
| 1813 | 46 | 11 |
| 1814 | 48 | 12 |
| 1815 | 40 | 13 |
| 1816 | 43 | 14 |
| 1817 | 42 | 15 |
| 1818 | 38 | 16 |
| 1819 | 33 | 17 |
| 1820 | 27 | 18 |
| 1821 | 41 | 19 |
| 1822 | 31 | 20 |
| 1823 | 30 | 21 |
| 1824 | 41 | 22 |
| 1825 | 28 | 23, 24 |
| 1826 | 32 | 24 |
| 1827 | 47 | 25 |
| 1828 | 55 | 26 |
| 1829 | 44 | 27 |
| 1830 | 58 | 28, 29 |
| 1831 | 42 | 30 |
| 1832 | 56 | 31 |
| 1833 | 41 | 32 |
| 1834 | 62 | 33 |
| 1835 | 41 | 34 |
| 1836 | 52 | 35 |
| 1837 | 20 | 36 |
| 1838 | 41 | 37 |
| 1839 | 49 | 38 |
| 1840 | 43 | 39 |
| 1841 | 30 | 40 |
| 1842 | 44 | 41 |
| 1843 | 31 | 42 |
| 1844 | 46 | 43, 44 |
| 1845 | 55 | 44, 45 |
| 1846 | 42 | 45, 46 |
| 1847 | 35 | 46, 47 |
| 1848 | 33 | 47, 48 |
| 1849 | 43 | 48, 49 |
| 1850 | 89 | 49, 50, 51, 52 |
| 1851 | 86 | 51, 52, 53 |
| 1852 | 97 | 53, 54, 55, 154 |
| 1853 | 53 | 55, 56, 57, 154 |
| 1854 | 82 | 56, 57, 58 |
| 1855 | 69 | 58, 59 |
| 1856 | 94 | 59, 60 |
| 1857 | 58 | 60, 61 |
| 1858 | 75 | 61, 62, 139 |
| 1859 | 71 | 62, 63, 64 |
| 1860 | 109 | 63, 64, 65, 154 |
| 1861 | 68 | 65, 66 |
| 1862 | 74 | 66, 67, 113 |
| 1863 | 40 | 67, 68 |
| 1864 | 81 | 68, 69, 154 |
| 1865 | 61 | 69, 70, 72, 112, 154 |
| 1866 | 91 | 70, 71, 72, 154 |
| 1867 | 134 | 71, 72, 73, 78 |
| 1868 | 82 | 73, 113 |
| 1869 | 159 | 74, 75, 77, 78, 154 |
| 1870 | 154 | 76, 77, 79, 81, 154 |
| 1871 | 146 | 77, 78, 79, 81 |
| 1872 | 160 | 79, 80, 81, 83, 154 |
| 1873 | 243 | 82, 83, 84, 85, 86, 154 |
| 1874 | 189 | 85, 86, 87, 88, 89, 90, 154 |
| 1875 | 172 | 87, 88, 89, 90, 91, 92, 154 |
| 1876 | 241 | 91, 92, 93, 94, 154 |
| 1877 | 238 | 93, 94, 95, 96, 97, 154 |
| 1878 | 222 | 95, 96, 97, 98, 154 |
| 1879 | 201 | 97, 98, 99, 100, 101, 102, 113, 154 |
| 1880 | 229 | 100, 101, 102, 103, 113, 137, 153, 154 |
| 1881 | 210 | 102, 103, 104, 105, 154 |
| 1882 | 248 | 104, 105, 106, 107, 108, 154 |
| 1883 | 264 | 106, 107, 108, 109, 110 |
| 1884 | 273 | 109, 110, 111, 112, 118 |
| 1885 | 271 | 112, 113, 114, 115, 116 |
| 1886 | 278 | 116, 117, 118, 119 |
| 1887 | 299 | 119, 120, 121, 122, 123, 125 |
| 1888 | 294 | 124, 125, 126, 127, 128, 129, 131 |
| 1889 | 249 | 129, 130, 131, 132, 136 |
| 1890 | 280 | 132, 133, 134, 135, 136, 137, 141 |
| 1891 | 301 | 137, 138, 139, 140, 141, 142, 190 |
| 1892 | 253 | 142, 143, 144, 145, 146, 149 |
| 1893 | 274 | 147, 148, 149, 150 |
| 1894 | 261 | 151, 152, 153, 154, 155 |
| 1895 | 272 | 155, 156, 157, 158, 159, 160, 183 |
| 1896 | 244 | 160, 161, 162, 163, 164 |
| 1897 | 213 | 164, 165, 166, 167, 168 |
| 1898 | 172 | 168, 169, 170, 171, 172, 173, 179 |
| 1899 | 195 | 172, 173, 174, 175, 176 |
| 1900 | 233 | 175, 176, 177, 178, 179, 180, 181 |
| 1901 | 158 | 179, 180, 181, 182, 183, 190 |
| 1902 | 198 | 183, 184, 185, 186, 187 |
| 1903 | 227 | 187, 188, 189, 190, 191 |
| 1904 | 207 | 192, 193, 194, 195, 196 |
| 1905 | 194 | 196, 197, 198, 199 |
| 1906 | 189 | 200, 201, 202, 203 |
| 1907 | 190 | 204, 205, 206, 207 |
| 1908 | 176 | 207, 208, 209, 210, 211 |
| 1909 | 181 | 211, 212, 213, 214, 215 |
| 1910 | 185 | 215, 216, 217, 218, 219 |
| 1911 | 176 | 219, 220, 221, 222 |
| 1912 | 230 | 222, 223, 224, 225, 226 |
| 1913 | 312 | 226, 227, 228, 229, 230, 231 |
| 1914 | 286 | 231, 232, 233, 234, 235 |
| 1915 | 288 | 235, 236, 237, 238, 239 |
| 1916 | 222 | 239, 240, 241, 242 |
| 1917 | 220 | 242, 243, 244, 245 |
| 1918 | 200 | 245, 246, 247, 248 |
| 1919 | 235 | 248, 249, 250, 251 |
| 1920 | 195 | 251, 252, 253, 254 |
| 1921 | 212 | 254, 255, 256, 257 |
| 1922 | 191 | 257, 258, 259, 260 |
| 1923 | 227 | 260, 261, 262, 263 |
| 1924 | 221 | 263, 264, 265, 266 |
| 1925 | 222 | 266, 267, 268, 269 |
| 1926 | 215 | 269, 270, 271, 272 |
| 1927 | 199 | 272, 273, 274, 275 |
| 1928 | 150 | 275, 276, 277, 278 |
| 1929 | 131 | 278, 279, 280 |
| 1930 | 137 | 280, 281, 282 |
| 1931 | 177 | 281, 282, 283, 284 |
| 1932 | 171 | 284, 285, 286, 287 |
| 1933 | 164 | 287, 288, 289, 290 |
| 1934 | 171 | 290, 291, 292, 293 |
| 1935 | 173 | 293, 294, 295, 296 |
| 1936 | 156 | 296, 297, 298, 299 |
| 1937 | 155 | 299, 300, 301, 302 |
| 1938 | 165 | 302, 303, 304, 305 |
| 1939 | 152 | 305, 306, 307, 308 |
| 1940 | 151 | 308, 309, 310, 311 |
| 1941 | 156 | 311, 312, 313, 314 |
| 1942 | 160 | 314, 315, 316, 317 |
| 1943 | 167 | 317, 318, 319, 320 |
| 1944 | 136 | 320, 321, 322, 323 |
| 1945 | 158 | 323, 324, 325, 326 |
| 1946 | 140 | 326, 327, 328, 329 |
| 1947 | 136 | 329, 330, 331, 332 |
| 1948 | 117 | 332, 333, 334, 335, 338 |
| 1949 | 131 | 335, 336, 337, 338 |
| 1950 | 93 | 338, 339, 340 |
| 1951 | 99 | 340, 341, 342 |
| 1952 | 107 | 342, 343, 344 |
| 1953 | 106 | 344, 345, 346 |
| 1954 | 78 | 346, 347, 348 |
| 1955 | 78 | 348, 349, 350 |
| 1956 | 97 | 350, 351, 352 |
| 1957 | 183 | 352, 353, 354, 355 |
| 1958 | 261 | 355, 356, 357, 358 |
| 1959 | 252 | 358, 359, 360, 361 |
| 1960 | 238 | 361, 362, 363, 364 |
| 1961 | 271 | 364, 365, 366, 367, 368 |
| 1962 | 248 | 368, 369, 370, 371 |
| 1963 | 377 | 371, 372, 373, 374, 375 |
| 1964 | 325 | 375, 376, 377, 378, 379 |
| 1965 | 279 | 379, 380, 381, 382 |
| 1966 | 299 | 382, 383, 384, 385 |
| 1967 | 370 | 385, 386, 387, 388, 389 |
| 1968 | 361 | 389, 390, 391, 392, 393 |
| 1969 | 323 | 393, 394, 395, 396 |
| 1970 | 248 | 396, 397, 398, 399, 400 |
| 1971 | 182 | 400, 401, 402, 403, 404 |
| 1972 | 188 | 404, 405, 406, 407, 408, 409 |
| 1973 | 194 | 409, 410, 411, 412, 413, 414 |
| 1974 | 168 | 414, 415, 416, 417, 418, 419 |
| 1975 | 163 | 419, 420, 421, 422, 423 |
| 1976 | 202 | 423, 424, 425, 426, 427, 428, 429 |
| 1977 | 184 | 429, 430, 431, 432, 433, 434 |
| 1978 | 185 | 434, 435, 436, 437, 438, 439 |
| 1979 | 163 | 439, 440, 441, 442, 443, 444 |
| 1980 | 178 | 444, 445, 446, 447, 448, 449 |
| 1981 | 165 | 449, 450, 451, 452, 453, 454 |
| 1982 | 182 | 454, 455, 456, 457, 458, 459 |
| 1983 | 181 | 459, 460, 461, 462, 463, 464 |
| 1984 | 186 | 464, 465, 466, 467, 468, 469 |
| 1985 | 184 | 469, 470, 471, 472, 473, 474 |
| 1986 | 171 | 474, 475, 476, 477, 478, 479 |
| 1987 | 108 | 479, 480, 481, 482, 483, 484 |
| 1988 | 143 | 484, 485, 486, 487, 488 |
| 1989 | 154 | 488, 489, 490, 491, 492, 493 |
| 1990 | 144 | 493, 494, 495, 496, 497, 498 |
| 1991 | 136 | 498, 499, 500, 501, 502 |
| 1992 | 118 | 502, 503, 504, 505, 506 |
| 1993 | 123 | 506, 507, 508, 509, 510 |
| 1994 | 101 | 510, 511, 512, 513 |
| 1995 | 99 | 513, 514, 515, 516 |
| 1996 | 96 | 516, 517, 518, 519 |
| 1997 | 99 | 519, 520, 521, 522 |
| 1998 | 99 | 522, 523, 524, 525 |
| 1999 | 94 | 525, 526, 527, 528 |
| 2000 | 84 | 528, 529, 530, 531 |
| 2001 | 90 | 531, 532, 533, 534 |
| 2002 | 89 | 534, 535, 536, 537 |
| 2003 | 84 | 537, 538, 539, 540 |
| 2004 | 84 | 540, 541, 542, 543 |
| 2005 | 85 | 543, 544, 545, 546 |
| 2006 | 81 | 546, 547, 548, 549 |
| 2007 | 75 | 549, 550, 551, 552 |
| 2008 | 116 | 552, 553, 554, 555, 556 |
| 2009 | 51 | 555, 556, 557, 558 |
| 2010 | 81 | 558, 559, 560, 561, 562 |
| 2011 | 87 | 562, 563, 564, 565 |
| 2012 | 79 | 565, 566, 567, 568 |
| 2013 | 82 | 568, 569, 570, 571 |
| 2014 | 73 | 571, 572, 573, 574 |
| 2015 | 73 | 574, 575, 576, 577 |
| 2016 | 81 | 577, 578, 579, 580 |
| 2017 | 68 | 580, 581, 582, 583 |
| 2018 | 72 | 583, 584, 585, 586 |
| 2019 | 73 | 586, 587, 588, 589 |
| 2020 | 68 | 589, 590, 591, 592 |
| 2021 | 77 | 592, 593, 594, 595 |
| 2022 | 47 | 596, 597 |
| 2023 | 59 | 598, 599, 600, 601 |
| 2024 | 62 | 601, 602, 603, 604 |
| 2025 | 59 | 604, 605, 606, 607 |
| 2026 | 49 (Note: Published through June 2026.) | 607, 608 |
| Total | 31,034 | |

== See also ==

Lists of United States Supreme Court cases by volume

Lists of United States Supreme Court cases
