= United States v. Heirs of De Haro =

United States v. The Heirs of Francisco De Haro
- Supreme Court of the United States

Decided March 12, 1860
- Full case name: United States v. The Heirs of Francisco De Haro
- Citations: 63 U.S. 293 (more) 22 How. 293; 16 L. Ed. 343

Holding
- Held that a plat made in 1853 of land adjudged to be covered by a Mexican grant, and confirmed in 1862, is sustained as the correct designation of the property covered by the grant.

Court membership
- Chief Justice Roger B. Taney Associate Justices John McLean · James M. Wayne; John Catron · Peter V. Daniel; Samuel Nelson · Robert C. Grier; John A. Campbell · Nathan Clifford

Case opinion
- Majority: J. McLean

United States v. The Heirs of Francisco De Haro, 63 U.S. (22 How.) 293 (1860), was a case in which the Supreme Court of the United States held that a plat made in 1853 of land adjudged to be covered by a Mexican grant, and confirmed in 1862, is sustained as the correct designation of the property covered by the grant.

== Background ==
In 1843 Francisco De Haro obtained an affirmation of a Mexican land grant from the then Governor of California. The De Haro's maintained possession of that land continuously since that time. At his death, the United States land commissioners found against the heirs who sought to confirm their title to the land. The U.S. District Court for the Northern District of California reversed that judgment and confirmed the title. The United States appealed and the U.S. Supreme Court agreed to hear the case.

== Opinion of the Court ==
Affirmed. Justice John McLean delivered the opinion of the court. McLean stated that the lower court had found that the date on the affirmation of the grant had been altered, and thus could not be used against the heirs. In addition, the decedent and his heirs had maintained possession of the land for 16 years and had made improvements. The heirs' title of the land was confirmed.
