= List of United States Supreme Court cases, volume 93 =

Supreme Court of the United States
- Interactive map of Supreme Court of the United States
- 38°53′26″N 77°00′16″W
- Established: March 4, 1789; 237 years ago
- Location: Washington, D.C.
- Coordinates: 38°53′26″N 77°00′16″W
- Composition method: Presidential nomination with Senate confirmation
- Authorised by: Constitution of the United States, Art. III, § 1
- Judge term length: life tenure, subject to impeachment and removal
- Number of positions: 9 (by statute)
- Website: supremecourt.gov

This is a list of cases reported in volume 93 of United States Reports, decided by the Supreme Court of the United States in 1876 and 1877.

== Justices of the Supreme Court at the time of 93 U.S. ==
The Supreme Court is established by Article III, Section 1 of the Constitution of the United States, which says: "The judicial Power of the United States, shall be vested in one supreme Court . . .". The size of the Court is not specified; the Constitution leaves it to Congress to set the number of justices. Under the Judiciary Act of 1789 Congress originally fixed the number of justices at six (one chief justice and five associate justices). Since 1789 Congress has varied the size of the Court from six to seven, nine, ten, and back to nine justices (always including one chief justice).

When the cases in 93 U.S. were decided the Court comprised the following nine members:

Portrait	Justice	Office	Home State	Succeeded	Date confirmed by the Senate (Vote)	Tenure on Supreme Court
	Morrison Waite	Chief Justice	Ohio	Salmon P. Chase	January 21, 1874 (63–0)	March 4, 1874 – March 23, 1888 (Died)
	Nathan Clifford	Associate Justice	Maine	Benjamin Robbins Curtis	January 12, 1858 (26–23)	January 21, 1858 – July 25, 1881 (Died)
	Noah Haynes Swayne	Associate Justice	Ohio	John McLean	January 24, 1862 (38–1)	January 27, 1862 – January 24, 1881 (Retired)
	Samuel Freeman Miller	Associate Justice	Iowa	Peter Vivian Daniel	July 16, 1862 (Acclamation)	July 21, 1862 – October 13, 1890 (Died)
	David Davis	Associate Justice	Illinois	John Archibald Campbell	December 8, 1862 (Acclamation)	December 10, 1862 – March 4, 1877 (Resigned)
	Stephen Johnson Field	Associate Justice	California	newly created seat	March 10, 1863 (Acclamation)	May 10, 1863 – December 1, 1897 (Retired)
	William Strong	Associate Justice	Pennsylvania	Robert Cooper Grier	February 18, 1870 (No vote recorded)	March 14, 1870 – December 14, 1880 (Retired)
	Joseph P. Bradley	Associate Justice	New Jersey	newly created seat	March 21, 1870 (46–9)	March 23, 1870 – January 22, 1892 (Died)
	Ward Hunt	Associate Justice	New York	Samuel Nelson	December 11, 1872 (Acclamation)	January 9, 1873 – January 27, 1882 (Retired)

== Citation style ==
Under the Judiciary Act of 1789 the federal court structure at the time comprised District Courts, which had general trial jurisdiction; Circuit Courts, which had mixed trial and appellate (from the US District Courts) jurisdiction; and the United States Supreme Court, which had appellate jurisdiction over the federal District and Circuit courts—and for certain issues over state courts. The Supreme Court also had limited original jurisdiction (i.e., in which cases could be filed directly with the Supreme Court without first having been heard by a lower federal or state court). There were one or more federal District Courts and/or Circuit Courts in each state, territory, or other geographical region.

Bluebook citation style is used for case names, citations, and jurisdictions.

- "C.C.D." = United States Circuit Court for the District of . . .
  - e.g.,"C.C.D.N.J." = United States Circuit Court for the District of New Jersey
- "D." = United States District Court for the District of . . .
  - e.g.,"D. Mass." = United States District Court for the District of Massachusetts
- "E." = Eastern; "M." = Middle; "N." = Northern; "S." = Southern; "W." = Western
  - e.g.,"C.C.S.D.N.Y." = United States Circuit Court for the Southern District of New York
  - e.g.,"M.D. Ala." = United States District Court for the Middle District of Alabama
- "Ct. Cl." = United States Court of Claims
- The abbreviation of a state's name alone indicates the highest appellate court in that state's judiciary at the time.
  - e.g.,"Pa." = Supreme Court of Pennsylvania
  - e.g.,"Me." = Supreme Judicial Court of Maine

== List of cases in 93 U.S. ==
Case Name	Page and year	Opinion of the Court	Concurring opinion(s)	Dissenting opinion(s)	Lower Court	Disposition
Hoge v. Richmond and Danville Railroad Company	1 (1876)	Waite	none	none	C.C.D.S.C.	acceleration denied
Gaines v. Hale	3 (1876)	Bradley	none	none	Ark.	affirmed
South Carolina v. Georgia	4 (1876)	Strong	none	none	original	dismissed
Fuller v. Claflin	14 (1876)	Hunt	none	none	C.C.W.D. Ark.	reversed
Ex parte Parks	18 (1876)	Bradley	none	none	original	habeas corpus denied
New York Life Insurance Company v. Statham	24 (1876)	Bradley	Waite; Strong	Waite; Clifford	C.C.S.D. Miss.	reversed
Terry v. Abraham	38 (1876)	Miller	none	none	C.C.S.D. Ga.	affirmed
Smith v. Chapman	41 (1876)	Clifford	none	none	C.C.D. Minn.	reversed
Terry v. Hatch	44 (1876)	Waite	none	none	C.C.S.D. Ga.	dismissed
Beaver v. Taylor	46 (1876)	Hunt	none	none	C.C.S.D. Ill.	affirmed
Grymes v. Sanders	55 (1876)	Swayne	none	none	C.C.E.D. Va.	reversed
Birdsall v. Coolidge	64 (1876)	Clifford	none	none	C.C.D. Nev.	reversed
Hurst v. Western and Atlantic Railroad Company	71 (1876)	Waite	none	none	C.C.E.D. Tenn.	affirmed
Chemung Canal Bank v. Lowery	72 (1876)	Bradley	none	none	C.C.W.D. Wis.	affirmed
Ryan v. Carter	78 (1876)	Davis	none	none	C.C.E.D. Mo.	affirmed
Kitchen v. Randolph	86 (1876)	Waite	none	none	C.C.E.D. Pa.	supersedeas vacated
Dresser v. Missouri and Iowa Railway Construction Company	92 (1876)	Hunt	none	none	C.C.D. Iowa	affirmed
Bird v. Louisiana State Bank	96 (1876)	Bradley	none	none	C.C.D. La.	reversed
Sherlock v. Alling	99 (1876)	Field	none	none	Ind.	affirmed
Tippecanoe County v. Lucas	108 (1876)	Field	none	none	Ind.	affirmed
Home Insurance Company v. City of Augusta	116 (1876)	Swayne	none	none	Ga.	affirmed
Calhoun County v. American Emigrant Company	124 (1876)	Clifford	none	none	C.C.D. Iowa	affirmed
Claflin v. Houseman	130 (1876)	Bradley	none	none	N.Y.	affirmed
Hendrick v. Lindsay	143 (1876)	Davis	none	none	C.C.N.D.N.Y.	affirmed
O'Hara v. Macconnell	150 (1876)	Miller	none	none	C.C.W.D. Pa.	reversed
Kerrison v. Stewart	155 (1876)	Waite	none	none	C.C.D.S.C.	affirmed
Tilton v. Cofield	163 (1876)	Swayne	none	none	Sup. Ct. Terr. Colo.	reversed
French v. Fyan	169 (1876)	Miller	none	none	C.C.E.D. Mo.	affirmed
Bank of Kentucky v. Adams Express Company	174 (1876)	Strong	none	none	C.C.D. Ky.	reversed
United States v. 43 Gallons Whiskey	188 (1876)	Davis	none	none	C.C.D. Minn.	reversed
Ober v. Gallagher	199 (1876)	Waite	none	none	C.C.E.D. Ark.	affirmed
Sherman v. Buick	209 (1876)	Miller	none	none	Cal.	reversed
Morgan v. Louisiana	217 (1876)	Field	none	none	La.	affirmed
Grant v. Hartford and New Haven Railroad Company	225 (1876)	Bradley	none	none	C.C.D. Conn.	affirmed
Hornor v. Henning	228 (1876)	Miller	none	none	Sup. Ct. D.C.	affirmed
Del Valle v. Harrison	233 (1876)	Waite	none	none	C.C.D. La.	dismissed
Shaw v. United States	235 (1876)	Field	none	none	Ct. Cl.	affirmed
Schacker v. Hartford Fire Insurance Company	241 (1876)	Waite	none	none	C.C.N.D. Ill.	dismissed
Garfielde v. United States	242 (1876)	Hunt	none	none	Ct. Cl.	reversed
Whiteside v. United States	247 (1876)	Clifford	none	none	Ct. Cl.	affirmed
Barkley v. Levee Commissioners of the Parishes of Madison and Carroll, Louisiana	258 (1876)	Bradley	none	none	C.C.D. La.	affirmed
Broughton v. City of Pensacola	266 (1876)	Field	none	none	C.C.N.D. Fla.	affirmed
Dalton v. Jennings	271 (1876)	Miller	none	none	C.C.S.D.N.Y.	affirmed
Windsor v. McVeigh	274 (1876)	Field	none	none	Alexandria Corp. Ct.	affirmed
Bigelow v. Berkshire Life Insurance Company	284 (1876)	Davis	none	none	C.C.N.D. Ill.	affirmed
Sawin v. Kenny	289 (1876)	Waite	none	none	C.C.E.D. Ark.	affirmed
Indianapolis and St. Louis Railroad Company v. Horst	291 (1876)	Swayne	none	none	C.C.D. Ind.	affirmed
The Atlas	302 (1876)	Clifford	none	none	C.C.E.D.N.Y.	reversed
Kimball v. Evans	320 (1876)	Waite	none	none	Ohio	dismissed
Talty v. Freedman's Savings Bank Company	321 (1876)	Swayne	none	none	Sup. Ct. D.C.	affirmed
Brant v. Virginia Coal and Iron Company	326 (1876)	Field	none	none	C.C.D.W. Va.	reversed
The Juniata	337 (1876)	Swayne	none	none	C.C.D. La.	multiple
Smith v. Gaines	341 (1876)	Miller	none	none	C.C.D. La.	affirmed
Cockle v. Flack	344 (1876)	Miller	none	none	C.C.N.D. Ill.	affirmed
Wiswall v. Campbell	347 (1876)	Waite	none	none	C.C.N.D. Ill.	dismissed
Cowdrey v. Galveston, Houston and Henderson Railroad Company	352 (1876)	Field	none	none	C.C.E.D. Tex.	affirmed
Norton v. Switzer	355 (1876)	Clifford	none	none	La.	affirmed
Cohn v. United States Corset Company	366 (1876)	Strong	none	Clifford	C.C.S.D.N.Y.	affirmed
Dodge v. Freedman's Savings and Trust Company	379 (1876)	Hunt	none	none	Sup. Ct. D.C.	affirmed
Callanan v. Hurley	387 (1876)	Strong	none	none	C.C.D. Iowa	reversed
Mutual Life Insurance Company v. Snyder	393 (1876)	Davis	none	none	C.C.E.D. Pa.	affirmed
Ex parte Karstendick	396 (1876)	Waite	none	none	original	habeas corpus denied
The John L. Hasbrouck	405 (1877)	Clifford	none	none	C.C.E.D.N.Y.	affirmed
Sage v. Central Railroad Company	412 (1876)	Waite	none	Miller	C.C.D. Iowa	dismissal denied
DeBary v. Arthur	420 (1876)	Hunt	none	none	C.C.S.D.N.Y.	affirmed
Osterberg v. Union Trust Company	424 (1877)	Davis	none	none	C.C.N.D. Ill.	affirmed
Lovejoy v. Spafford	430 (1876)	Hunt	none	none	C.C.D. Minn.	reversed
Lake Superior and Mississippi Railroad Company v. United States	442 (1877)	Bradley	none	Miller	Ct. Cl.	reversed
Russell v. Dodge	460 (1877)	Field	none	none	C.C.N.D.N.Y.	affirmed
Wiggins v. Utah	465 (1876)	Miller	none	Clifford	Utah	reversed
Smith v. Goodyear Dental Vulcanite Company	486 (1877)	Strong	none	Bradley	C.C.D. Mass.	affirmed
Randolph County v. Post	502 (1877)	Hunt	none	none	C.C.S.D. Ill.	affirmed
White v. Luning	514 (1876)	Davis	none	none	C.C.D. Cal.	affirmed
Home Insurance Company v. Baltimore Warehouse Company	527 (1876)	Strong	none	none	C.C.D. Md.	affirmed
Stanton v. Embrey	548 (1877)	Clifford	none	none	Sup. Ct. D.C.	affirmed
Huff v. Doyle	558 (1877)	Miller	none	none	Cal.	reversed
Western Union Telegraph Company v. Rogers	565 (1877)	Waite	none	none	C.C.D. Neb.	dismissed
Callaway County v. Foster	567 (1876)	Hunt	none	Miller	C.C.W.D. Mo.	affirmed
The Idaho	575 (1877)	Strong	none	none	C.C.E.D.N.Y.	affirmed
United States v. Thompson	586 (1877)	Waite	none	none	Md.	dismissed
Mackie v. Story	589 (1877)	Bradley	none	none	C.C.D. La.	affirmed
Bond v. Moore	593 (1877)	Waite	none	none	Tenn.	affirmed
West Wisconsin Railway Company v. Trempealeau County	595 (1876)	Swayne	none	none	Wis.	affirmed
Badger v. United States ex rel. Bolles	599 (1877)	Hunt	none	none	C.C.N.D. Ill.	affirmed
Desmare v. United States	605 (1877)	Swayne	none	none	Ct. Cl.	affirmed
City of Winona v. Cowdrey	612 (1877)	Davis	none	none	C.C.D. Minn.	affirmed
Wood County v. Lackawana Iron and Coal Company	619 (1877)	Swayne	none	none	C.C.W.D. Wis.	affirmed
United States v. Ferrary	625 (1876)	Strong	none	none	C.C.E.D. Tenn.	reversed
Donaldson v. Farwell	631 (1877)	Davis	none	none	C.C.E.D. Wis.	affirmed
Heydenfeldt v. Daney Gold and Silver Mining Company	634 (1877)	Davis	none	none	Nev.	affirmed
Bayne v. United States	642 (1877)	Davis	none	none	C.C.D. Md.	affirmed
Tameling v. United States Freehold and Emigration Company	644 (1877)	Davis	none	none	Sup. Ct. Terr. Colo.	affirmed
Hervey v. Rhode Island Locomotive Works	664 (1877)	Davis	none	none	C.C.S.D. Ill.	reversed
Kibbe v. Ditto	674 (1877)	Davis	none	none	C.C.N.D. Ill.	affirmed
