= List of United States Supreme Court cases, volume 70 =

Supreme Court of the United States
- Interactive map of Supreme Court of the United States
- 38°53′26″N 77°00′16″W
- Established: March 4, 1789; 236 years ago
- Location: Washington, D.C.
- Coordinates: 38°53′26″N 77°00′16″W
- Composition method: Presidential nomination with Senate confirmation
- Authorised by: Constitution of the United States, Art. III, § 1
- Judge term length: life tenure, subject to impeachment and removal
- Number of positions: 9 (by statute)
- Website: supremecourt.gov

This is a list of cases reported in volume 70 (3 Wall.) of United States Reports, decided by the Supreme Court of the United States in 1865 and 1866.

== Nominative reports ==
In 1874, the U.S. government created the United States Reports, and retroactively numbered older privately published case reports as part of the new series. As a result, cases appearing in volumes 1–90 of U.S. Reports have dual citation forms; one for the volume number of U.S. Reports, and one for the volume number of the reports named for the relevant reporter of decisions (these are called "nominative reports").

=== John William Wallace ===
Starting with the 66th volume of U.S. Reports, the Reporter of Decisions of the Supreme Court of the United States was John William Wallace. Wallace was Reporter of Decisions from 1863 to 1874, covering volumes 68 through 90 of United States Reports which correspond to volumes 1 through 23 of his Wallace's Reports. As such, the dual form of citation to, for example, Gilman v. City of Philadelphia is 70 U.S. (3 Wall.) 713 (1866).

Wallace's Reports were the final nominative reports for the US Supreme Court; starting with volume 91, cases were identified simply as "(volume #) U.S. (page #) (year)".

== Justices of the Supreme Court at the time of 70 U.S. (3 Wall.) ==
The Supreme Court is established by Article III, Section 1 of the Constitution of the United States, which says: "The judicial Power of the United States, shall be vested in one supreme Court . . .". The size of the Court is not specified; the Constitution leaves it to Congress to set the number of justices. Under the Judiciary Act of 1789 Congress originally fixed the number of justices at six (one chief justice and five associate justices). Since 1789 Congress has varied the size of the Court from six to seven, nine, ten, and back to nine justices (always including one chief justice).

When the cases in 70 U.S. (3 Wall.) were decided the following nine (due to the Judicial Circuits Act of 1866) justices were members of the Court:

Portrait	Justice	Office	Home State	Succeeded	Date confirmed by the Senate (Vote)	Tenure on Supreme Court
	Salmon P. Chase	Chief Justice	Ohio	Roger B. Taney	December 6, 1864 (Acclamation)	December 15, 1864 – May 7, 1873 (Died)
	James Moore Wayne	Associate Justice	Georgia	William Johnson	January 9, 1835 (Acclamation)	January 14, 1835 – July 5, 1867 (Died)
	Samuel Nelson	Associate Justice	New York	Smith Thompson	February 14, 1845 (Acclamation)	February 27, 1845 – November 28, 1872 (Retired)
	Robert Cooper Grier	Associate Justice	Pennsylvania	Henry Baldwin	August 4, 1846 (Acclamation)	August 10, 1846 – January 31, 1870 (Retired)
	Nathan Clifford	Associate Justice	Maine	Benjamin Robbins Curtis	January 12, 1858 (26–23)	January 21, 1858 – July 25, 1881 (Died)
	Noah Haynes Swayne	Associate Justice	Ohio	John McLean	January 24, 1862 (38–1)	January 27, 1862 – January 24, 1881 (Retired)
	Samuel Freeman Miller	Associate Justice	Iowa	Peter Vivian Daniel	July 16, 1862 (Acclamation)	July 21, 1862 – October 13, 1890 (Died)
	David Davis	Associate Justice	Illinois	John Archibald Campbell	December 8, 1862 (Acclamation)	December 10, 1862 – March 4, 1877 (Resigned)
	Stephen Johnson Field	Associate Justice	California	newly created seat	March 10, 1863 (Acclamation)	May 10, 1863 – December 1, 1897 (Retired)

== Citation style ==
Under the Judiciary Act of 1789 the federal court structure at the time comprised District Courts, which had general trial jurisdiction; Circuit Courts, which had mixed trial and appellate (from the US District Courts) jurisdiction; and the United States Supreme Court, which had appellate jurisdiction over the federal District and Circuit courts—and for certain issues over state courts. The Supreme Court also had limited original jurisdiction (i.e., in which cases could be filed directly with the Supreme Court without first having been heard by a lower federal or state court). There were one or more federal District Courts and/or Circuit Courts in each state, territory, or other geographical region.

Bluebook citation style is used for case names, citations, and jurisdictions.

- "C.C.D." = United States Circuit Court for the District of . . .
  - e.g.,"C.C.D.N.J." = United States Circuit Court for the District of New Jersey
- "D." = United States District Court for the District of . . .
  - e.g.,"D. Mass." = United States District Court for the District of Massachusetts
- "E." = Eastern; "M." = Middle; "N." = Northern; "S." = Southern; "W." = Western
  - e.g.,"C.C.S.D.N.Y." = United States Circuit Court for the Southern District of New York
  - e.g.,"M.D. Ala." = United States District Court for the Middle District of Alabama
- "Ct. Cl." = United States Court of Claims
- The abbreviation of a state's name alone indicates the highest appellate court in that state's judiciary at the time.
  - e.g.,"Pa." = Supreme Court of Pennsylvania
  - e.g.,"Me." = Supreme Judicial Court of Maine

== List of cases in 70 U.S. (3 Wall.) ==
Case Name	Page and year	Opinion of the Court	Concurring opinion(s)	Dissenting opinion(s)	Lower court	Disposition
Lovejoy v. Murray	1 (1866)	Miller	none	none	C.C.D. Mass.	affirmed
The Plymouth	20 (1866)	Nelson	none	none	C.C.N.D. Ill.	affirmed
The Kimball	37 (1866)	Field	none	none	C.C.D. Mass.	affirmed
Castro v. United States	46 (1866)	Chase	none	none	N.D. Cal.	dismissed
The Binghamton Bridge	51 (1866)	Davis	none	Grier	N.Y.	reversed
The Josephine	83 (1866)	Chase	none	none	C.C.D. La.	affirmed
Sheboygan Company v. Parker	93 (1866)	Grier	none	none	C.C.D. Wis.	affirmed
Sparrow v. Strong	97 (1866)	Chase	none	none	Nev.	dismissal denied
Lewis v. Campau	106 (1866)	Chase	none	none	Mich.	dismissed
York Company v. Central Railroad	107 (1866)	Field	none	none	C.C.D. Ill.	affirmed
Cliquot's Champagne	114 (1866)	Swayne	none	none	N.D. Cal.	affirmed
Fennerstein's Champagne	145 (1866)	Swayne	none	none	N.D. Cal.	affirmed
Walker v. Western Transportation Company	150 (1866)	Miller	none	none	C.C.D. Ill.	affirmed
The Thompson	155 (1866)	Davis	none	none	S.D.N.Y.	affirmed
The Louisiana	164 (1866)	Grier	none	none	C.C.D. Md.	affirmed
Blackburn v. Crawfords	175 (1866)	Swayne	none	Clifford	C.C.D. Md.	reversed
Blossom v. Milwaukee and Chicago Railroad Company	196 (1866)	Clifford	none	none	D. Wis.	affirmed
Turnpike Company v. Maryland	210 (1866)	Nelson	none	none	Md.	affirmed
The Cornelius	214 (1866)	Miller	none	none	C.C.E.D. Pa.	affirmed
The Convoy's Wheat	225 (1866)	Miller	none	none	N.D.N.Y.	affirmed
The Cheshire	231 (1866)	Field	none	none	C.C.S.D.N.Y.	affirmed
Nebraska v. Lockwood	236 (1866)	Swayne	none	none	Sup. Ct. Terr. Neb.	affirmed
City of Providence v. Babcock	240 (1865)	Davis	none	none	C.C.D.R.I.	affirmed
Blanchard v. Brown	245 (1866)	Davis	none	none	C.C.N.D. Ill.	affirmed
Daniels v. Rock Island Railway Company	250 (1866)	Swayne	none	none	C.C.N.D. Ill.	certification
Newell v. Norton	257 (1866)	Grier	none	none	C.C.D. La.	affirmed
The Ottawa	268 (1866)	Clifford	none	none	C.C.N.D. Ill.	affirmed
City of Cincinnati v. Morgan	275 (1866)	Nelson	none	none	not indicated	affirmed
Havemeyer v. Iowa County	294 (1866)	Swayne	none	none	C.C.D. Wis.	certification
Merced Mining Company v. Boggs	304 (1866)	Chase	none	none	Cal.	dismissed
The Granite State	310 (1866)	Grier	none	none	C.C.S.D.N.Y.	reversed
Suffolk Manufacturing Company v. Hayden	315 (1866)	Nelson	none	none	not indicated	affirmed
Cheang-Kee v. United States	320 (1866)	Chase	none	none	C.C.D. Cal.	affirmed
Thomson v. Lee County	327 (1866)	Davis	none	none	C.C.D. Iowa	reversed
Minnesota Mining Company v. National Mining Company	332 (1866)	Grier	none	none	Mich.	affirmed
Buck v. Colbath	334 (1866)	Miller	none	none	Minn.	affirmed
McAndrews v. Thatcher	347 (1866)	Clifford	none	none	C.C.S.D.N.Y.	reversed
Brown v. Tarkington	377 (1866)	Nelson	none	none	C.C.D. Ind.	affirmed
McGuire v. Massachusetts I	382 (1866)	Chase	none	none	Mass. Super. Ct.	motions denied
McGuire v. Massachusetts II	387 (1866)	Nelson	none	none	Mass. Super. Ct.	affirmed
Comstock v. Crawford	396 (1866)	Field	none	none	C.C.D. Wis.	affirmed
United States v. Holliday	407 (1866)	Miller	none	none	C.C.E.D. Mich.	certification
De Sobry v. Nicholson	420 (1866)	Swayne	none	none	C.C.D. La.	affirmed
Barrel v. Transportation Company	424 (1866)	Chase	none	none	C.C.N.D. Ill.	dismissed
The Iron-Clad Atlanta	425 (1866)	Field	none	none	D. Mass.	affirmed
Peralta v. United States	434 (1866)	Davis	none	none	N.D. Cal.	affirmed
United States v. Cutting	441 (1866)	Grier	none	none	C.C.D.N.Y.	reversed
United States v. Fisk	445 (1866)	Grier	none	none	C.C.D.N.Y.	affirmed
Green v. Van Buskerk	448 (1866)	Chase	none	none	N.Y. Sup. Ct.	supersedeas granted
The Sally Magee	451 (1866)	Swayne	none	none	S.D.N.Y.	affirmed
Simpson and Company v. Dall	460 (1866)	Davis	none	none	not indicated	reversed
Beard v. Federy	478 (1866)	Field	none	none	C.C.N.D. Cal.	affirmed
Bank for Savings v. Collector of Internal Revenue	495 (1866)	Clifford	none	none	C.C.S.D.N.Y.	certification
The Bermuda	514 (1866)	Chase	none	none	E.D. Pa.	affirmed
The Hart	559 (1866)	Chase	none	none	S.D.N.Y.	affirmed
Bollinger's Champagne	560 (1866)	Nelson	none	none	C.C.D. Cal.	reversed
The Douro	564 (1866)	Chase	none	none	S.D.N.Y.	affirmed
The Mohawk	566 (1866)	Miller	none	none	C.C.D. Mich.	reversed
Van Allen v. New York	573 (1866)	Nelson	Chase	none	N.Y.	reversed
The Admiral	603 (1866)	Clifford	none	none	C.C.E.D. Pa.	affirmed
The Reform	617 (1866)	Clifford	none	none	C.C.D. Va.	reversed
Younge v. Guilbeau	636 (1866)	Field	none	none	W.D. Tex.	reversed
United States v. Scott	642 (1866)	Miller	none	none	C.C.D. Ind.	certification
United States v. Murphy	649 (1866)	Miller	none	none	C.C.D. Wis.	certification
Rogers v. Burlington	654 (1866)	Clifford	none	Field, Miller	C.C.D. Iowa	reversed
United States v. Circuit Judges	673 (1866)	Nelson	none	Field	C.C.D. Cal.	appeal on behalf of U.S.
Merriam v. Haas	687 (1866)	per curiam	none	none	"Fed. Ct. Minn." (sic)	dismissal denied
United States v. Dashiel	688 (1866)	Clifford	none	Grier	not indicated	dismissal denied
Minnesota Company v. Chamberlain	704 (1866)	Chase	none	none	C.C.D. Wis.	affirmed
Gilman v. City of Philadelphia	713 (1866)	Swayne	none	Clifford	C.C.E.D. Pa.	affirmed
Secrist v. Green	744 (1866)	Davis	none	none	C.C.N.D. Ill.	affirmed
United States v. Gomez	752 (1866)	Clifford	none	none	S.D. Cal.	reversed
The Herald	768 (1866)	Chase	none	none	C.C.E.D. Pa.	affirmed
Dehon v. Bernal	774 (1866)	Miller	none	none	N.D. Cal.	affirmed

== See also ==
- certificate of division
