= List of United States Supreme Court cases, volume 66 =

Supreme Court of the United States
- Interactive map of Supreme Court of the United States
- 38°53′26″N 77°00′16″W
- Established: March 4, 1789; 236 years ago
- Location: Washington, D.C.
- Coordinates: 38°53′26″N 77°00′16″W
- Composition method: Presidential nomination with Senate confirmation
- Authorised by: Constitution of the United States, Art. III, § 1
- Judge term length: life tenure, subject to impeachment and removal
- Number of positions: 9 (by statute)
- Website: supremecourt.gov

This is a list of cases reported in volume 66 (1 Black) of United States Reports, decided by the Supreme Court of the United States in 1861 and 1862.

== Nominative reports ==
In 1874, the U.S. government created the United States Reports, and retroactively numbered older privately published case reports as part of the new series. As a result, cases appearing in volumes 1–90 of U.S. Reports have dual citation forms; one for the volume number of U.S. Reports, and one for the volume number of the reports named for the relevant reporter of decisions (these are called "nominative reports").

=== Jeremiah Sullivan Black ===
Starting with the 66th volume of U.S. Reports, the Reporter of Decisions of the Supreme Court of the United States was Jeremiah S. Black. Black was Reporter of Decisions from 1861 to 1862, covering volumes 66 and 67 of United States Reports which correspond to volumes 1 and 2 of his Black's Reports. As such, the dual form of citation to, for example, The Steamer New Philadelphia is 66 U.S. (1 Black) 62 (1862).

== Justices of the Supreme Court at the time of 66 U.S. (1 Black) ==
The Supreme Court is established by Article III, Section 1 of the Constitution of the United States, which says: "The judicial Power of the United States, shall be vested in one supreme Court . . .". The size of the Court is not specified; the Constitution leaves it to Congress to set the number of justices. Under the Judiciary Act of 1789 Congress originally fixed the number of justices at six (one chief justice and five associate justices). Since 1789 Congress has varied the size of the Court from six to seven, nine, ten, and back to nine justices (always including one chief justice).

Due to two unfilled vacancies, when the cases in 66 U.S. (1 Black) were decided the Court comprised only these seven members:

Portrait	Justice	Office	Home State	Succeeded	Date confirmed by the Senate (Vote)	Tenure on Supreme Court
	Roger B. Taney	Chief Justice	Maryland	John Marshall	March 15, 1836 (29–15)	March 28, 1836 – October 12, 1864 (Died)
	James Moore Wayne	Associate Justice	Georgia	William Johnson	January 9, 1835 (Acclamation)	January 14, 1835 – July 5, 1867 (Died)
	John Catron	Associate Justice	Tennessee	newly created seat	March 8, 1837 (28–15)	May 1, 1837 – May 30, 1865 (Died)
	Samuel Nelson	Associate Justice	New York	Smith Thompson	February 14, 1845 (Acclamation)	February 27, 1845 – November 28, 1872 (Retired)
	Robert Cooper Grier	Associate Justice	Pennsylvania	Henry Baldwin	August 4, 1846 (Acclamation)	August 10, 1846 – January 31, 1870 (Retired)
	Nathan Clifford	Associate Justice	Maine	Benjamin Robbins Curtis	January 12, 1858 (26–23)	January 21, 1858 – July 25, 1881 (Died)
	Noah Haynes Swayne	Associate Justice	Ohio	John McLean	January 24, 1862 (38–1)	January 27, 1862 – January 24, 1881 (Retired)

== Citation style ==
Under the Judiciary Act of 1789 the federal court structure at the time comprised District Courts, which had general trial jurisdiction; Circuit Courts, which had mixed trial and appellate (from the US District Courts) jurisdiction; and the United States Supreme Court, which had appellate jurisdiction over the federal District and Circuit courts—and for certain issues over state courts. The Supreme Court also had limited original jurisdiction (i.e., in which cases could be filed directly with the Supreme Court without first having been heard by a lower federal or state court). There were one or more federal District Courts and/or Circuit Courts in each state, territory, or other geographical region.

Bluebook citation style is used for case names, citations, and jurisdictions.

- "C.C.D." = United States Circuit Court for the District of . . .
  - e.g.,"C.C.D.N.J." = United States Circuit Court for the District of New Jersey
- "D." = United States District Court for the District of . . .
  - e.g.,"D. Mass." = United States District Court for the District of Massachusetts
- "E." = Eastern; "M." = Middle; "N." = Northern; "S." = Southern; "W." = Western
  - e.g.,"C.C.S.D.N.Y." = United States Circuit Court for the Southern District of New York
  - e.g.,"M.D. Ala." = United States District Court for the Middle District of Alabama
- "Ct. Cl." = United States Court of Claims
- The abbreviation of a state's name alone indicates the highest appellate court in that state's judiciary at the time.
  - e.g.,"Pa." = Supreme Court of Pennsylvania
  - e.g.,"Me." = Supreme Judicial Court of Maine

== List of cases in 66 U.S. (1 Black) ==
Case Name	Page and year	Opinion of the Court	Concurring opinion(s)	Dissenting opinion(s)	Lower Court	Disposition
Dutton v. Strong	23 (1861)	Clifford	none	none	D. Wis.	reversed
United States v. Hensley	35 (1861)	Grier	none	none	N.D. Cal.	reversed
Bacon v. Hart	38 (1862)	Taney	none	none	not indicated	dismissed
Weightman v. City of Washington	39 (1862)	Clifford	none	none	C.C.D.C.	reversed
Wabash and Erie Canal v. Beers	54 (1862)	Taney	none	none	C.C.D. Ind.	affirmed
United States v. Babbit	55 (1862)	Swayne	none	none	D. Iowa	reversed
The Steamer New Philadelphia	62 (1862)	Wayne	none	none	S.D.N.Y.	affirmed
Clark v. Hackett	77 (1862)	Nelson	none	none	C.C.D.N.H.	affirmed
Hager v. Thomson	80 (1862)	Clifford	none	none	C.C.D.N.J.	affirmed
Hecker v. Fowler	95 (1862)	Taney	none	none	C.C.S.D.N.Y.	dismissal denied
Dermott v. Wallach	96 (1862)	Nelson	none	none	C.C.D.C.	reversed
O'Brien v. Smith	99 (1862)	Taney	none	none	not indicated	affirmed
Stiles v. Davis	101 (1861)	Nelson	none	none	N.D. Ill.	reversed
4,885 Bags of Linseed	108 (1861)	Taney	none	none	C.C.D. Mass.	affirmed
Hogg v. Ruffner	115 (1861)	Grier	none	none	D. Ind.	reversed
The Barque Island City	121 (1862)	Grier	none	none	C.C.D. Mass.	affirmed
O'Brien v. Perry	132 (1862)	Nelson	none	none	Mo.	affirmed
Bryan v. United States	140 (1862)	Nelson	none	none	C.C.D.C.	reversed
Gregg v. Tesson	150 (1862)	Nelson	none	none	N.D. Ill.	reversed
Nelson v. Woodruff	156 (1862)	Wayne	none	none	S.D.N.Y.	affirmed
The Brig Collenberg	170 (1862)	Clifford	none	none	C.C.S.D.N.Y.	affirmed
Carondelet v. City of St. Louis	179 (1862)	Catron	none	none	Mo.	affirmed
Hodge v. Combs	192 (1862)	Grier	none	none	C.C.D.C.	affirmed
Magwire v. Tyler	195 (1862)	Catron	none	Taney	Mo.	affirmed
Bates v. Illinois Central Railroad Company	204 (1862)	Catron	none	none	C.C.N.D. Ill.	affirmed
Johnston v. Jones	209 (1862)	Swayne	none	none	C.C.N.D. Ill.	affirmed
United States v. Knight's Administrator I	227 (1862)	Clifford	none	Wayne	N.D. Cal.	reversed
Rogers v. Law	253 (1862)	Nelson	none	none	C.C.D.C.	affirmed
Massachusetts v. Federal Street Meeting House	262 (1862)	Grier	none	none	Mass.	dismissed
United States v. Wilson	267 (1862)	Nelson	none	none	N.D. Cal.	affirmed
Pratt v. Fitzhugh	271 (1862)	Nelson	none	none	C.C.N.D.N.Y.	dismissed
Moffitt v. Garr	273 (1862)	Nelson	none	none	C.C.S.D. Ohio	affirmed
United States v. Vallejo	283 (1862)	Wayne	none	none	D. Cal.	affirmed
Ohio and Mississippi Railway Company v. Wheeler	286 (1862)	Taney	none	none	C.C.D. Ind.	certification
United States v. Neleigh	298 (1862)	Grier	none	none	N.D. Cal.	reversed
Farni v. Tesson	309 (1862)	Grier	none	none	C.C.N.D. Ill.	reversed
Harkness v. Underhill	316 (1862)	Catron	none	none	C.C.N.D. Ill.	affirmed
Laflin v. Herrington	326 (1862)	Wayne	none	none	C.C.N.D. Ill.	affirmed
United States v. Covilland	339 (1861)	Catron	none	none	N.D. Cal.	reversed
Singleton v. Touchard	342 (1862)	Grier	none	none	C.C.N.D. Cal.	affirmed
Clagett v. Kilbourne	346 (1862)	Nelson	none	none	D. Iowa	affirmed
Farney v. Towle	350 (1862)	Taney	none	none	N.Y. Super. Ct.	dismissed
Crews v. Burcham	352 (1862)	Nelson	none	none	C.C.N.D. Ill.	affirmed
Rice v. Minnesota and Northwestern Railroad Company	358 (1862)	Clifford	none	Nelson; Wayne	D. Minn.	reversed
Woods v. Lawrence County	386 (1862)	Wayne	none	none	C.C.W.D. Pa.	certification
The Ship Marcellus	414 (1862)	Grier	none	none	C.C.D. Mass.	affirmed
Cleveland v. Chamberlain	419 (1862)	Grier	none	none	D. Wis.	dismissed
Vance v. Campbell	427 (1862)	Nelson	none	none	C.C.S.D. Ohio	reversed
Haussknecht v. Claypool	431 (1862)	Nelson	none	none	C.C.S.D. Ohio	reversed
Jefferson Branch Bank v. Skelly	436(1862)	Wayne	none	none	Ohio	reversed
Washington v. Ogden	450 (1862)	Grier	none	none	C.C.N.D. Ill.	reversed
McCool v. Smith	459 (1862)	Swayne	none	none	C.C.N.D. Ill.	reversed
Verden v. Coleman	472 (1862)	Grier	none	none	Ind.	dismissed
Franklin Branch Bank v. Ohio	474 (1862)	Wayne	none	none	Ohio	reversed
Leonard v. Davis	476 (1862)	Clifford	none	none	C.C.D. Mich.	reversed
United States v. Jackalow	484 (1862)	Nelson	none	none	C.C.D.N.J.	certification
United States v. Knight's Administrator II	488 (1862)	Taney	none	none	N.D. Cal.	rehearing denied
Flanigan v. Turner	491 (1862)	Nelson	none	none	C.C.D. Md.	affirmed
The Water Witch	494 (1862)	Grier	none	none	C.C.S.D.N.Y.	affirmed
White's Administrator v. United States	501 (1862)	Grier	none	none	N.D. Cal.	mandamus denied
Ex parte Gordon	503 (1862)	Taney	none	none	C.C.S.D.N.Y.	prohibition denied
Foster v. Goddard	506 (1862)	Swayne	none	none	C.C.D. Mass.	affirmed
Hoyt v. Shelden	518 (1862)	Taney	none	none	N.Y. Super. Ct.	dismissed
The Steamer St. Lawrence	522 (1862)	Taney	none	none	C.C.S.D.N.Y.	affirmed
Law v. Cross	533 (1862)	Grier	none	none	C.C.S.D.N.Y.	affirmed
United States v. Vallejo	541 (1862)	Nelson	none	Grier; Wayne	N.D. Cal.	reversed
Inbusch v. Farwell	566 (1862)	Clifford	none	none	D. Wis.	affirmed
The Propeller Commerce	574 (1862)	Clifford	none	none	C.C.S.D.N.Y.	affirmed
Silliman v. Hudson River Bridge Company	582 (1862)	Nelson	none	none	C.C.N.D.N.Y.	certification
Pindell v. Mullikin	585 (1862)	Catron	none	none	C.C.D. Mo.	affirmed
Sherman v. Smith	587 (1862)	Nelson	none	none	N.Y. Sup. Ct.	affirmed
Glasgow v. Hortiz	595 (1862)	Grier	none	none	Mo.	affirmed
Conway v. Taylor's Executor	603 (1862)	Swayne	none	none	Ky.	affirmed

== See also ==
certificate of division
