= List of United States Supreme Court cases, volume 24 =

Supreme Court of the United States
- Interactive map of Supreme Court of the United States
- 38°53′26″N 77°00′16″W
- Established: March 4, 1789; 237 years ago
- Location: Washington, D.C.
- Coordinates: 38°53′26″N 77°00′16″W
- Composition method: Presidential nomination with Senate confirmation
- Authorised by: Constitution of the United States, Art. III, § 1
- Judge term length: life tenure, subject to impeachment and removal
- Number of positions: 9 (by statute)
- Website: supremecourt.gov

This is a list of cases reported in volume 24 (11 Wheat.) of United States Reports, decided by the Supreme Court of the United States in 1825 and 1826.

== Nominative reports ==
In 1874, the U.S. government created the United States Reports, and retroactively numbered older privately published case reports as part of the new series. As a result, cases appearing in volumes 1–90 of U.S. Reports have dual citation forms; one for the volume number of U.S. Reports, and one for the volume number of the reports named for the relevant reporter of decisions (these are called "nominative reports").

=== Henry Wheaton ===
Starting with the 14th volume of U.S. Reports, the Reporter of Decisions of the Supreme Court of the United States was Henry Wheaton. Wheaton was Reporter of Decisions from 1816 to 1827, covering volumes 14 through 25 of United States Reports which correspond to volumes 1 through 12 of his Wheaton's Reports. As such, the dual form of citation to, for example, Brooks v. Marbury is 24 U.S. (11 Wheat.) 78 (1826).

== Justices of the Supreme Court at the time of 24 U.S. (11 Wheat.) ==
The Supreme Court is established by Article III, Section 1 of the Constitution of the United States, which says: "The judicial Power of the United States, shall be vested in one supreme Court . . .". The size of the Court is not specified; the Constitution leaves it to Congress to set the number of justices. Under the Judiciary Act of 1789 Congress originally fixed the number of justices at six (one chief justice and five associate justices). Since 1789 Congress has varied the size of the Court from six to seven, nine, ten, and back to nine justices (always including one chief justice).

When the cases in 24 U.S. (11 Wheat.) were decided, the Court comprised these seven justices:

Portrait	Justice	Office	Home State	Succeeded	Date confirmed by the Senate (Vote)	Tenure on Supreme Court
	John Marshall	Chief Justice	Virginia	Oliver Ellsworth	January 27, 1801 (Acclamation)	February 4, 1801 – July 6, 1835 (Died)
	Bushrod Washington	Associate Justice	Virginia	James Wilson	December 20, 1798 (Acclamation)	November 9, 1798 (Recess Appointment) – November 26, 1829 (Died)
	William Johnson	Associate Justice	South Carolina	Alfred Moore	March 24, 1804 (Acclamation)	May 7, 1804 – August 4, 1834 (Died)
	Thomas Todd	Associate Justice	Kentucky	new seat	March 2, 1807 (Acclamation)	March 3, 1807 – February 7, 1826 (Died)
	Gabriel Duvall	Associate Justice	Maryland	Samuel Chase	November 18, 1811 (Acclamation)	November 23, 1811 – January 12, 1835 (Resigned)
	Joseph Story	Associate Justice	Massachusetts	William Cushing	November 18, 1811 (Acclamation)	February 3, 1812 – September 10, 1845 (Died)
	Smith Thompson	Associate Justice	New York	Henry Brockholst Livingston	December 9, 1823 (Acclamation)	September 1, 1823 – December 18, 1843 (Died)

== Citation style ==
Under the Judiciary Act of 1789 the federal court structure at the time comprised District Courts, which had general trial jurisdiction; Circuit Courts, which had mixed trial and appellate (from the US District Courts) jurisdiction; and the United States Supreme Court, which had appellate jurisdiction over the federal District and Circuit courts—and for certain issues over state courts. The Supreme Court also had limited original jurisdiction (i.e., in which cases could be filed directly with the Supreme Court without first having been heard by a lower federal or state court). There were one or more federal District Courts and/or Circuit Courts in each state, territory, or other geographical region.

Bluebook citation style is used for case names, citations, and jurisdictions.

- "C.C.D." = United States Circuit Court for the District of . . .
  - e.g.,"C.C.D.N.J." = United States Circuit Court for the District of New Jersey
- "D." = United States District Court for the District of . . .
  - e.g.,"D. Mass." = United States District Court for the District of Massachusetts
- "E." = Eastern; "M." = Middle; "N." = Northern; "S." = Southern; "W." = Western
  - e.g.,"C.C.S.D.N.Y." = United States Circuit Court for the Southern District of New York
  - e.g.,"M.D. Ala." = United States District Court for the Middle District of Alabama
- "Ct. Cl." = United States Court of Claims
- The abbreviation of a state's name alone indicates the highest appellate court in that state's judiciary at the time.
  - e.g.,"Pa." = Supreme Court of Pennsylvania
  - e.g.,"Me." = Supreme Judicial Court of Maine

== List of cases in 24 U.S. (11 Wheat.) ==
Case Name	Page and year	Opinion of the Court	Concurring opinion(s)	Dissenting opinion(s)	Lower Court	Disposition
The Marianna Flora	1 (1825)	Story	none	none	C.C.D. Mass.	affirmed
Etting v. Second Bank of the United States	59 (1826)	Marshall	none	none	C.C.D. Md.	affirmed
Brooks v. Marbury	78 (1826)	Marshall	none	none	C.C.D.C.	reversed
Harding v. Handy	103 (1826)	Marshall	none	none	C.C.D.R.I.	multiple
Cassell v. Carroll	134 (1826)	Story	none	none	C.C.D. Md.	affirmed
Second Bank of the United States v. Smith	171 (1826)	Thompson	none	none	C.C.D.C.	reversed
United States v. Vanzandt	184 (1826)	Washington	none	none	C.C.D.C.	reversed
Otis v. Walter	192 (1826)	Johnson	none	none	Mass.	reversed
Hinde's Lessee v. Longworth	199 (1826)	Thompson	none	none	C.C.D. Ohio	reversed
Littlepage v. Fowler	215 (1826)	Johnson	none	none	C.C.D. Ky.	affirmed
Taylor's Devisee v. Owing	226 (1826)	Marshall	none	none	C.C.D. Ky.	affirmed
Perkins v. Hart	237 (1826)	Washington	none	none	C.C.D. Ohio	certification
Armstrong v. Toler	258 (1826)	Marshall	none	none	C.C.D. Pa.	affirmed
Chirac v. Reinicker	280 (1826)	Story	none	none	C.C.D. Md.	reversed
Finley v. Second Bank of the United States	304 (1826)	Marshall	none	none	C.C.D. Ky.	multiple
Wetzell v. Bussard	309 (1826)	Marshall	none	none	C.C.D.C.	affirmed
Fowle v. City of Alexandria	320 (1826)	Story	none	none	C.C.D.C.	reversed
Piles v. Bouldin	325 (1826)	Duvall	none	none	C.C.D.W. Tenn.	reversed
Governeur's Heirs v. Robertson	332 (1826)	Johnson	none	none	C.C.D. Ky.	certification
Shelby v. Guy	361 (1826)	Johnson	none	none	not indicated	reversed
Walker v. Griffin's Heirs	375 (1826)	Marshall	none	none	C.C.D. Ky.	multiple
Doe v. Winn	380 (1826)	Thompson	none	none	C.C.D. Ga.	certification
United States v. Amedy	392 (1826)	Story	none	none	C.C.D. Va.	certification
The Antelope	413 (1826)	per curiam	none	none	C.C.D. Ga.	certification
Williams v. Second Bank of the United States	414 (1826)	Marshall	none	none	C.C.D. Ohio	dismissed
Barnes v. Williams	415 (1826)	Marshall	none	none	not indicated	certification
United States v. Kelly	417 (1826)	Washington	none	none	C.C.D. Pa.	certification
United States v. Tappan	419 (1826)	Thompson	none	none	C.C.D. Mass.	certification
Chace v. Vasquez	429 (1826)	per curiam	none	none	C.C.D. Md.	dismissed
Mills v. Second Bank of the United States	431 (1826)	Story	none	none	C.C.D. Ohio	affirmed
Miller's Heirs v. McIntire	441 (1826)	Marshall	none	none	C.C.D. Ky.	reversed
Carnochan v. Christie	446 (1826)	Marshall	none	none	C.C.D. Ga.	reversed
United States v. Ortega	467 (1826)	Washington	none	none	C.C.E.D. Pa.	certification

== See also ==
- certificate of division
