= List of United States Supreme Court cases, volume 69 =

Supreme Court of the United States
- Interactive map of Supreme Court of the United States
- 38°53′26″N 77°00′16″W
- Established: March 4, 1789; 236 years ago
- Location: Washington, D.C.
- Coordinates: 38°53′26″N 77°00′16″W
- Composition method: Presidential nomination with Senate confirmation
- Authorised by: Constitution of the United States, Art. III, § 1
- Judge term length: life tenure, subject to impeachment and removal
- Number of positions: 9 (by statute)
- Website: supremecourt.gov

This is a list of cases reported in volume 69 (2 Wall.) of United States Reports, decided by the Supreme Court of the United States in 1864 and 1865.

== Nominative reports ==
In 1874, the U.S. government created the United States Reports, and retroactively numbered older privately-published case reports as part of the new series. As a result, cases appearing in volumes 1–90 of U.S. Reports have dual citation forms; one for the volume number of U.S. Reports, and one for the volume number of the reports named for the relevant reporter of decisions (these are called "nominative reports").

=== John William Wallace ===
Starting with the 66th volume of U.S. Reports, the Reporter of Decisions of the Supreme Court of the United States was John William Wallace. Wallace was Reporter of Decisions from 1863 to 1874, covering volumes 68 through 90 of United States Reports which correspond to volumes 1 through 23 of his Wallace's Reports. As such, the dual form of citation to, for example, The Andromeda is 69 U.S. (2 Wall.) 481 (1865).

Wallace's Reports were the final nominative reports for the US Supreme Court; starting with volume 91, cases were identified simply as "(volume #) U.S. (page #) (year)".

== Justices of the Supreme Court at the time of 69 U.S. (2 Wall.) ==
The Supreme Court is established by Article III, Section 1 of the Constitution of the United States, which says: "The judicial Power of the United States, shall be vested in one supreme Court . . .". The size of the Court is not specified; the Constitution leaves it to Congress to set the number of justices. Under the Judiciary Act of 1789 Congress originally fixed the number of justices at six (one chief justice and five associate justices). Since 1789 Congress has varied the size of the Court from six to seven, nine, ten, and back to nine justices (always including one chief justice).

When the cases in 69 U.S. (2 Wall.) were decided the Court's membership began at ten justices, then shrank to nine upon the death of Chief Justice Taney in October 1864, and increased again to the statutory number of ten when Chief Justice Salmon P. Chase took office in December 1864:

Portrait	Justice	Office	Home State	Succeeded	Date confirmed by the Senate (Vote)	Tenure on Supreme Court
	Roger B. Taney	Chief Justice	Maryland	John Marshall	March 15, 1836 (29–15)	March 28, 1836 – October 12, 1864 (Died)
	Salmon P. Chase	Chief Justice	Ohio	Roger B. Taney	December 6, 1864 (Acclamation)	December 15, 1864 – May 7, 1873 (Died)
	James Moore Wayne	Associate Justice	Georgia	William Johnson	January 9, 1835 (Acclamation)	January 14, 1835 – July 5, 1867 (Died)
	John Catron	Associate Justice	Tennessee	newly created seat	March 8, 1837 (28–15)	May 1, 1837 – May 30, 1865 (Died)
	Samuel Nelson	Associate Justice	New York	Smith Thompson	February 14, 1845 (Acclamation)	February 27, 1845 – November 28, 1872 (Retired)
	Robert Cooper Grier	Associate Justice	Pennsylvania	Henry Baldwin	August 4, 1846 (Acclamation)	August 10, 1846 – January 31, 1870 (Retired)
	Nathan Clifford	Associate Justice	Maine	Benjamin Robbins Curtis	January 12, 1858 (26–23)	January 21, 1858 – July 25, 1881 (Died)
	Noah Haynes Swayne	Associate Justice	Ohio	John McLean	January 24, 1862 (38–1)	January 27, 1862 – January 24, 1881 (Retired)
	Samuel Freeman Miller	Associate Justice	Iowa	Peter Vivian Daniel	July 16, 1862 (Acclamation)	July 21, 1862 – October 13, 1890 (Died)
	David Davis	Associate Justice	Illinois	John Archibald Campbell	December 8, 1862 (Acclamation)	December 10, 1862 – March 4, 1877 (Resigned)
	Stephen Johnson Field	Associate Justice	California	newly created seat	March 10, 1863 (Acclamation)	May 10, 1863 – December 1, 1897 (Retired)

== Notable Cases in 69 U.S. (2 Wall.) ==
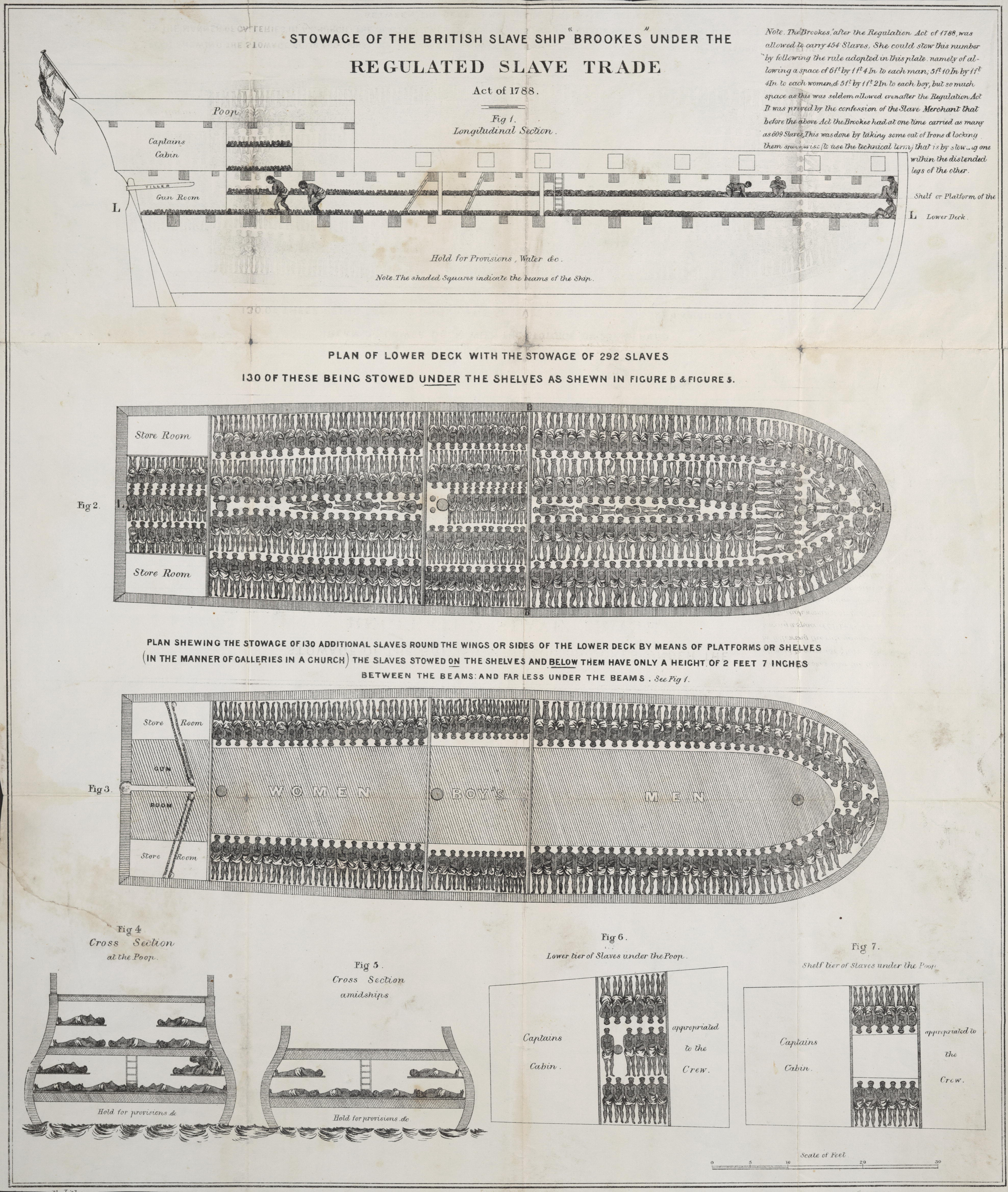
Sketch of interior of a slave ship

=== The Slavers Cases ===
The four Slavers Cases ((The Bark Kate), 69 U.S. (2 Wall.) 350 (1865); (The Bark Sarah), 69 U.S. (2 Wall.) 366 (1865); (The Weathergage), 69 U.S. (2 Wall.) 375 (1865); and (The Bark Reindeer), 69 U.S. (2 Wall.) 383 (1865)), involve three ships seized by the federal government near New York City, and one seized off Newport, Rhode Island. The ships appeared to be set up for the slave trade, and had voyages planned to the western coast of Africa where the slave trade flourished at the time. The cargo, fittings, and other circumstances surrounding the ships led to a presumption that they were engaged in slaving, contrary to several federal statutes.

In The Bark Kate (at pp. 363–64), Chief Justice Chase wrote in his opinion for the Court:

In considering this evidence, it is to be borne in mind that for more than three hundred years the western coast of Africa has been scourged by the atrocities of the slave trade, and that this inhuman traffic, although at length proscribed and pursued with severe penalties by nearly all Christian nations, has continued, with almost unabated activity and ferocity, even to our times. Fears of forfeiture of property, and even of life, have been easily overcome by hopes of enormous gains, and so long as markets for slaves remain open, and imperfect execution of the laws permits the expectation of profit from crime, the most conspicuous results of penal legislation will be, more cunning in the contrivance and more adroitness in the use of means for evading or defeating its intent and operation. The difficulty of penetrating the disguises of crime is enhanced in the case of the slave trade by the circumstance that a very considerable traffic [in lawful commerce] . . . has sprung up and is carried on with the same African coast from which human cargoes are collected. It does not seem unreasonable, since it is the paramount interest of humanity that the traffic in men be at all events arrested, to require of the trader who engages in a commerce [that] . . . is necessarily suspicious from its theater and circumstances, that he keep his operations so clear and so distinct in their character as to repel the imputation of prohibited purpose.

In each of the four cases the Supreme Court upheld seizure of the ships by the federal government.

== Citation style ==
Under the Judiciary Act of 1789 the federal court structure at the time comprised District Courts, which had general trial jurisdiction; Circuit Courts, which had mixed trial and appellate (from the US District Courts) jurisdiction; and the United States Supreme Court, which had appellate jurisdiction over the federal District and Circuit courts—and for certain issues over state courts. The Supreme Court also had limited original jurisdiction (i.e., in which cases could be filed directly with the Supreme Court without first having been heard by a lower federal or state court). There were one or more federal District Courts and/or Circuit Courts in each state, territory, or other geographical region.

Bluebook citation style is used for case names, citations, and jurisdictions.

- "C.C.D." = United States Circuit Court for the District of . . .
  - e.g.,"C.C.D.N.J." = United States Circuit Court for the District of New Jersey
- "D." = United States District Court for the District of . . .
  - e.g.,"D. Mass." = United States District Court for the District of Massachusetts
- "E." = Eastern; "M." = Middle; "N." = Northern; "S." = Southern; "W." = Western
  - e.g.,"C.C.S.D.N.Y." = United States Circuit Court for the Southern District of New York
  - e.g.,"M.D. Ala." = United States District Court for the Middle District of Alabama
- "Ct. Cl." = United States Court of Claims
- The abbreviation of a state's name alone indicates the highest appellate court in that state's judiciary at the time.
  - e.g.,"Pa." = Supreme Court of Pennsylvania
  - e.g.,"Me." = Supreme Judicial Court of Maine

== List of cases in 69 U.S. (2 Wall.) ==
Case Name	Page & year	Opinion of the Court	Concurring opinion(s)	Dissenting opinion(s)	Lower Court	Disposition
Dermott v. Jones	1 (1865)	Swayne	none	none	C.C.D.C.	reversed
Hawthorne v. Calef	10 (1865)	Nelson	none	none	Me.	reversed
Drury v. Foster	24 (1865)	Nelson	none	none	"Federal Ct. Minn." (sic)	affirmed
Miles v. Caldwell	35 (1865)	Miller	none	none	C.C.D. Mo.	reversed
Providence T. Co. v. Norris	45 (1865)	Field	none	none	C.C.D.R.I.	reversed
Gregg v. Forsyth	56 (1865)	Nelson	none	none	C.C.D. Ill.	dismissed
Banks v. Ogden	57 (1865)	Chase	none	none	C.C.N.D. Ill.	reversed
Brooks v. Martin	70 (1864)	Miller	none	Catron	"Federal Ct. Wis." (sic)	affirmed
Badger v. Badger	87 (1865)	Grier	none	none	C.C.D. Mass.	affirmed
Brobst v. Brobst	96 (1865)	Nelson	none	none	not indicated	certification
Day v. Gallup	97 (1865)	Wayne	none	none	"Federal Ct. Minn." (sic)	dismissed
Humiston v. Stainthorp	106 (1865)	Nelson	none	none	C.C.N.D.N.Y.	dismissed
Murray v. Lardner	110 (1865)	Swayne	none	none	C.C.S.D.N.Y.	reversed
Heckers v. Fowler	123 (1865)	Clifford	none	none	C.C.S.D.N.Y.	affirmed
Ex parte Dugan	134 (1865)	per curiam	none	none	Sup. Ct. D.C.	certiorari granted
The Circassian	135 (1865)	Chase	none	Nelson	S.D. Fla.	affirmed
Freeborn v. Smith	160 (1865)	Grier	none	none	Sup. Ct. Terr. Nev.	affirmed
Sheets v. Selden's Lessee	177 (1865)	Field	none	none	C.C.D. Ind.	affirmed
Chittenden v. Brewster	191 (1865)	Nelson	none	none	C.C.N.D. Ill.	reversed
Campbell v. Read	198 (1865)	Chase	none	none	C.C.D.C.	dismissed
Bank Tax Case	200 (1865)	Nelson	none	none	N.Y.	reversed
Florentine v. Barton	210 (1865)	Grier	none	none	C.C.N.D. Ill.	affirmed
Cooke v. United States	218 (1864)	Chase	none	none	not indicated	dismissal denied
Smith v. United States	219 (1865)	Clifford	none	none	C.C.N.D. Ill.	reversed
Miller v. Sherry	237 (1865)	Swayne	none	none	C.C.N.D. Ill.	affirmed
Marine Bank v. Fulton Bank	252 (1865)	Miller	none	none	C.C.N.D. Ill.	affirmed
The Venice	258 (1865)	Chase	none	none	S.D. Fla.	affirmed
Pico v. United States	279 (1865)	Field	none	none	N.D. Cal.	affirmed
Bronson v. La Crosse & M.R.R. Co.	283 (1864)	Nelson	none	none	C.C.D. Wis.	reversed
Ransom v. Williams	313 (1865)	Swayne	none	none	C.C.N.D. Ill.	affirmed
Case v. Brown	320 (1865)	Grier	none	none	C.C.N.D. Ill.	affirmed
Harvey v. Tyler	328 (1865)	Miller	none	none	W.D. Va.	affirmed
The Slavers I	350 (1865)	Chase	none	none	S.D.N.Y.	affirmed
The Slavers II	366 (1865)	Clifford	none	none	S.D.N.Y.	affirmed
The Slavers III	375 (1865)	Clifford	none	none	C.C.S.D.N.Y.	affirmed
The Slavers IV	383 (1865)	Clifford	none	none	C.C.D.R.I.	affirmed
Albany B. Case	403 (1865)	per curiam	none	none	C.C.N.D.N.Y.	affirmed
Mrs. Alexander's Cotton	404 (1865)	Chase	none	none	S.D. Ill.	reversed
Tobey v. Leonards	423 (1865)	Wayne	none	none	C.C.D. Mass.	reversed
Milwaukee & M.R.R. Co. v. Soutter I	440 (1865)	Chase	none	none	"Federal Ct. Wis." (sic)	dismissal denied
United States v. Billing	444 (1865)	Grier	none	none	not indicated	affirmed
Pacific Mail S.S. Co. v. Joliffe	450 (1865)	Field	none	Miller	San Francisco Cnty. Ct.	affirmed
The Baigorry	474 (1865)	Chase	none	none	not indicated	affirmed
The Andromeda	481 (1865)	Chase	Nelson	none	S.D. Fla.	affirmed
Kutter v. Smith	491 (1865)	Miller	none	none	C.C.N.D. Ill.	affirmed
Levy Court v. Coroner	501 (1865)	Miller	none	none	C.C.D.C.	affirmed
Milwaukee & M.R.R. Co. v. Soutter II	510 (1865)	Miller	none	none	C.C.D. Wis.	reversed
United States v. Stone	525 (1865)	Grier	none	none	"Federal Ct. Kan." (sic)	affirmed
The Ann Caroline	538 (1865)	Clifford	none	none	C.C.S.D.N.Y.	affirmed
The Morning Light	550 (1865)	Clifford	none	none	C.C.S.D.N.Y.	affirmed
Gordon v. United States	561 (1865)	per curiam	none	none	Ct. Cl.	dismissed
The Sutter Case	562 (1865)	Nelson	none	none	N.D. Cal.	reversed
United States v. Pacheco	587 (1865)	Field	none	none	N.D. Cal.	affirmed
Read v. Bowman	591 (1865)	Clifford	none	none	C.C.N.D. Ill.	affirmed
Hogan v. Page	605 (1865)	Nelson	none	none	Mo.	reversed
Minnesota Co. v. St. Paul Co.	609 (1865)	Miller	none	Nelson	C.C.D. Wis.	reversed
The Fossat Case	649 (1864)	Nelson	none	Clifford	D. Cal.	reversed
Lowber v. Bangs	728 (1865)	Swayne	none	Clifford	C.C.D. Mass.	reversed
Ex parte Fleming	759 (1865)	Miller	none	none	D. Wis.	mandamus denied

== See also ==
Certificate of division
