= List of United States Supreme Court cases, volume 63 =

Supreme Court of the United States
- Interactive map of Supreme Court of the United States
- 38°53′26″N 77°00′16″W
- Established: March 4, 1789; 236 years ago
- Location: Washington, D.C.
- Coordinates: 38°53′26″N 77°00′16″W
- Composition method: Presidential nomination with Senate confirmation
- Authorised by: Constitution of the United States, Art. III, § 1
- Judge term length: life tenure, subject to impeachment and removal
- Number of positions: 9 (by statute)
- Website: supremecourt.gov

This is a list of cases reported in volume 63 (22 How.) of United States Reports, decided by the Supreme Court of the United States in 1859 and 1860.

== Nominative reports ==
In 1874, the U.S. government created the United States Reports, and retroactively numbered older privately published case reports as part of the new series. As a result, cases appearing in volumes 1–90 of U.S. Reports have dual citation forms; one for the volume number of U.S. Reports, and one for the volume number of the reports named for the relevant reporter of decisions (these are called "nominative reports").

=== Benjamin Chew Howard ===
Starting with the 42nd volume of U.S. Reports, the Reporter of Decisions of the Supreme Court of the United States was Benjamin Chew Howard. Howard was Reporter of Decisions from 1843 to 1860, covering volumes 42 through 65 of United States Reports which correspond to volumes 1 through 24 of his Howard's Reports. As such, the dual form of citation to, for example, Cucullu v. Emmerling is 63 U.S. (22 How.) 83 (1860).

== Justices of the Supreme Court at the time of 63 U.S. (22 How.) ==
The Supreme Court is established by Article III, Section 1 of the Constitution of the United States, which says: "The judicial Power of the United States, shall be vested in one supreme Court . . .". The size of the Court is not specified; the Constitution leaves it to Congress to set the number of justices. Under the Judiciary Act of 1789 Congress originally fixed the number of justices at six (one chief justice and five associate justices). Since 1789 Congress has varied the size of the Court from six to seven, nine, ten, and back to nine justices (always including one chief justice).

When the cases in 63 U.S. (22 How.) were decided the Court comprised these nine members:

Portrait	Justice	Office	Home State	Succeeded	Date confirmed by the Senate (Vote)	Tenure on Supreme Court
	Roger B. Taney	Chief Justice	Maryland	John Marshall	March 15, 1836 (29–15)	March 28, 1836 – October 12, 1864 (Died)
	John McLean	Associate Justice	Ohio	Robert Trimble	March 7, 1829 (Acclamation)	January 11, 1830 – April 4, 1861 (Died)
	James Moore Wayne	Associate Justice	Georgia	William Johnson	January 9, 1835 (Acclamation)	January 14, 1835 – July 5, 1867 (Died)
	John Catron	Associate Justice	Tennessee	newly created seat	March 8, 1837 (28–15)	May 1, 1837 – May 30, 1865 (Died)
	Peter Vivian Daniel	Associate Justice	Virginia	Philip P. Barbour	March 2, 1841 (25–5)	January 10, 1842 – May 31, 1860 (Died)
	Samuel Nelson	Associate Justice	New York	Smith Thompson	February 14, 1845 (Acclamation)	February 27, 1845 – November 28, 1872 (Retired)
	Robert Cooper Grier	Associate Justice	Pennsylvania	Henry Baldwin	August 4, 1846 (Acclamation)	August 10, 1846 – January 31, 1870 (Retired)
	John Archibald Campbell	Associate Justice	Alabama	John McKinley	March 22, 1853 (Acclamation)	April 11, 1853 – April 30, 1861 (Resigned)
	Nathan Clifford	Associate Justice	Maine	Benjamin Robbins Curtis	January 12, 1858 (26–23)	January 21, 1858 – July 25, 1881 (Died)

== Citation style ==
Under the Judiciary Act of 1789 the federal court structure at the time comprised District Courts, which had general trial jurisdiction; Circuit Courts, which had mixed trial and appellate (from the US District Courts) jurisdiction; and the United States Supreme Court, which had appellate jurisdiction over the federal District and Circuit courts—and for certain issues over state courts. The Supreme Court also had limited original jurisdiction (i.e., in which cases could be filed directly with the Supreme Court without first having been heard by a lower federal or state court). There were one or more federal District Courts and/or Circuit Courts in each state, territory, or other geographical region.

Bluebook citation style is used for case names, citations, and jurisdictions.

- "C.C.D." = United States Circuit Court for the District of . . .
  - e.g.,"C.C.D.N.J." = United States Circuit Court for the District of New Jersey
- "D." = United States District Court for the District of . . .
  - e.g.,"D. Mass." = United States District Court for the District of Massachusetts
- "E." = Eastern; "M." = Middle; "N." = Northern; "S." = Southern; "W." = Western
  - e.g.,"C.C.S.D.N.Y." = United States Circuit Court for the Southern District of New York
  - e.g.,"M.D. Ala." = United States District Court for the Middle District of Alabama
- "Ct. Cl." = United States Court of Claims
- The abbreviation of a state's name alone indicates the highest appellate court in that state's judiciary at the time.
  - e.g.,"Pa." = Supreme Court of Pennsylvania
  - e.g.,"Me." = Supreme Judicial Court of Maine

== List of cases in 63 U.S. (22 How.) ==
Case Name	Page & year	Opinion of the Court	Concurring opinion(s)	Dissenting opinion(s)	Lower court	Disposition of case
Parker v. Kane	1 (1860)	Campbell	none	none	D. Wis.	affirmed
White v. Wright W. & Co.	19 (1860)	McLean	none	none	La.	dismissed
Lawler v. Claflin	23 (1859)	McLean	none	none	Sup. Ct. Terr. Minn.	affirmed
Emerson v. Slater	28 (1860)	Clifford	none	none	C.C.D. Mass.	reversed
Overton v. Cheek	46 (1860)	McLean	none	none	C.C.D.W. Tenn.	dismissed
Nelson v. Leland	48 (1860)	McLean	Catron	Campbell	C.C.E.D. La.	reversed
Springfield Twp. v. Quick	56 (1860)	Catron	none	none	Ind.	affirmed
Kock v. Emmerling	69 (1860)	McLean	none	none	C.C.E.D. La.	affirmed
Morrill v. Cone	75 (1859)	Campbell	none	none	C.C.N.D. Ill.	affirmed
Cucullu v. Emmerling	83 (1860)	Grier	none	none	C.C.E.D. La.	affirmed
Hodge v. Williams	87 (1859)	Taney	none	none	E.D. Tex.	dismissed
United States v. Galbraith	89 (1860)	Nelson	none	none	N.D. Cal.	reversed
Bank of Pittsburgh v. Neal	96 (1860)	Clifford	none	none	C.C.D. Ind.	reversed
Insurance Co. v. Mordecai	111 (1860)	Nelson	none	none	C.C.D.S.C.	affirmed
Brewster v. Wakefield	118 (1860)	Taney	none	none	Sup. Ct. Terr. Minn.	reversed
Roach v. Chapman	129 (1860)	Grier	none	none	C.C.E.D. La.	affirmed
Le Roy v. Tatham	132 (1860)	McLean	none	none	C.C.S.D.N.Y.	affirmed
City of New Orleans v. Gaines	141 (1860)	Catron	none	none	C.C.E.D. La.	affirmed
Hale v. Gaines	144 (1860)	Catron	none	none	Ark.	affirmed
Gonzales v. United States	161 (1860)	McLean	Campbell	none	N.D. Cal.	affirmed
United States ex rel. Crawford v. Addison	174 (1860)	McLean	none	none	C.C.D.C.	supersedeas granted
Maxwell v. Moore	185 (1859)	Catron	none	none	Ark.	affirmed
Verden v. Coleman	192 (1860)	Catron	none	none	Ind.	dismissed
Lytle v. Arkansas	193 (1860)	Catron	none	McLean	Ark.	affirmed
Bondies v. Sherwood	214 (1859)	Grier	none	none	E.D. Tex.	dismissed
Chaffee v. Boston B. Co.	217 (1859)	Clifford	none	none	C.C.D. Mass.	reversed
United States v. Pacheco	225 (1860)	Catron	none	none	N.D. Cal.	reversed
Sinnot v. Davenport	227 (1859)	Nelson	none	none	Ala.	reversed
Foster v. Davenport	244 (1859)	Nelson	none	none	Ala.	reversed
Collins v. Thompson	246 (1860)	Nelson	none	none	C.C.S.D. Ala.	affirmed
Kimbro v. Bullitt	256 (1860)	Clifford	none	none	C.C.M.D. Tenn.	affirmed
Clark v. Bowen	270 (1860)	Catron	none	none	D. Wis.	affirmed
United States v. Garcia	274 (1860)	Catron	none	none	N.D. Cal.	reversed
McMicken's Ex'rs v. Perin	282 (1860)	Nelson	none	none	C.C.E.D. La.	affirmed
United States v. Hartnell's Heirs	286 (1860)	Catron	none	none	N.D. Cal.	affirmed
Yturbide's Ex'rs v. United States	290 (1860)	McLean	none	none	N.D. Cal.	affirmed
United States v. De Haro's Heirs	293 (1860)	McLean	none	none	N.D. Cal.	affirmed
United States v. Walker	299 (1860)	Clifford	none	none	C.C.S.D. Ala.	reversed
United States v. West's Heirs	315 (1860)	Wayne	none	none	N.D. Cal.	affirmed
Refeld v. Woodfolk	318 (1860)	Campbell	none	none	C.C.D. Ark.	dismissed
Ward v. Thompson	330 (1860)	Grier	none	none	C.C.D. Mich.	affirmed
Berthold v. McDonald	334 (1860)	Catron	none	none	Mo.	affirmed
Rey v. Simpson	341 (1860)	Clifford	none	none	Sup. Ct. Terr. Minn.	affirmed
Jeter v. Hewitt	352 (1860)	Campbell	none	none	C.C.E.D. La.	affirmed
Aspinwall v. Daviess Cnty.	364 (1860)	Nelson	none	none	C.C.D. Ind.	certification
Ogilvie v. Knox Ins. Co.	380 (1860)	Grier	none	none	C.C.D. Ind.	reversed
United States v. Teschmaker	392 (1860)	Nelson	none	none	N.D. Cal.	reversed
United States v. Pico	406 (1860)	Nelson	none	none	N.D. Cal.	reversed
United States v. Vallejo	416 (1860)	Nelson	none	none	N.D. Cal.	reversed
Thompson v. Roe	422 (1860)	Grier	none	none	C.C.D.C.	reversed
Dalton v. United States	436 (1860)	Grier	none	none	S.D. Cal.	reversed
Fuentes v. United States	443 (1860)	Wayne	none	none	N.D. Cal.	affirmed
New York & B.T. Co. v. Philadelphia & S.S.N. Co.	461 (1860)	Clifford	none	none	C.C.E.D. Pa.	affirmed.
Adams v. Preston	473 (1860)	Wayne	none	none	C.C.E.D. La.	affirmed
Howland v. Greenway	491 (1860)	Campbell	none	none	C.C.S.D.N.Y.	affirmed
Kilbourne v. State S. Inst.	503 (1860)	Wayne	none	none	D. Iowa	affirmed

== See also ==
certificate of division
