= List of United States Supreme Court cases, volume 89 =

Supreme Court of the United States
- Interactive map of Supreme Court of the United States
- 38°53′26″N 77°00′16″W
- Established: March 4, 1789; 236 years ago
- Location: Washington, D.C.
- Coordinates: 38°53′26″N 77°00′16″W
- Composition method: Presidential nomination with Senate confirmation
- Authorised by: Constitution of the United States, Art. III, § 1
- Judge term length: life tenure, subject to impeachment and removal
- Number of positions: 9 (by statute)
- Website: supremecourt.gov

This is a list of cases reported in volume 89 (22 Wall.) of United States Reports, decided by the Supreme Court of the United States in 1874 and 1875.

== Nominative reports ==
In 1874, the U.S. government created the United States Reports, and retroactively numbered older privately published case reports as part of the new series. As a result, cases appearing in volumes 1–90 of U.S. Reports have dual citation forms; one for the volume number of U.S. Reports, and one for the volume number of the reports named for the relevant reporter of decisions (these are called "nominative reports").

=== John William Wallace ===
Starting with the 66th volume of U.S. Reports, the Reporter of Decisions of the Supreme Court of the United States was John William Wallace. Wallace was Reporter of Decisions from 1863 to 1874, covering volumes 68 through 90 of United States Reports which correspond to volumes 1 through 23 of his Wallace's Reports. As such, the dual form of citation to, for example, Gavinzel v. Crump is 89 U.S. (22 Wall.) 308 (1875).

Wallace's Reports were the final nominative reports for the US Supreme Court; starting with volume 91, cases were identified simply as "(volume #) U.S. (page #) (year)".

== Justices of the Supreme Court at the time of 89 U.S. (22 Wall.) ==
The Supreme Court is established by Article III, Section 1 of the Constitution of the United States, which says: "The judicial Power of the United States, shall be vested in one supreme Court . . .". The size of the Court is not specified; the Constitution leaves it to Congress to set the number of justices. Under the Judiciary Act of 1789 Congress originally fixed the number of justices at six (one chief justice and five associate justices). Since 1789, Congress has varied the size of the Court from six to seven, nine, ten, and back to nine justices (always including one chief justice).

When the cases in 89 U.S. (22 Wall.) were decided the Court comprised the following nine members:

Portrait	Justice	Office	Home State	Succeeded	Date confirmed by the Senate (Vote)	Tenure on Supreme Court
	Morrison Waite	Chief Justice	Ohio	Salmon P. Chase	January 21, 1874 (63–0)	March 4, 1874 – March 23, 1888 (Died)
	Nathan Clifford	Associate Justice	Maine	Benjamin Robbins Curtis	January 12, 1858 (26–23)	January 21, 1858 – July 25, 1881 (Died)
	Noah Haynes Swayne	Associate Justice	Ohio	John McLean	January 24, 1862 (38–1)	January 27, 1862 – January 24, 1881 (Retired)
	Samuel Freeman Miller	Associate Justice	Iowa	Peter Vivian Daniel	July 16, 1862 (Acclamation)	July 21, 1862 – October 13, 1890 (Died)
	David Davis	Associate Justice	Illinois	John Archibald Campbell	December 8, 1862 (Acclamation)	December 10, 1862 – March 4, 1877 (Resigned)
	Stephen Johnson Field	Associate Justice	California	newly created seat	March 10, 1863 (Acclamation)	May 10, 1863 – December 1, 1897 (Retired)
	William Strong	Associate Justice	Pennsylvania	Robert Cooper Grier	February 18, 1870 (No vote recorded)	March 14, 1870 – December 14, 1880 (Retired)
	Joseph P. Bradley	Associate Justice	New Jersey	newly created seat	March 21, 1870 (46–9)	March 23, 1870 – January 22, 1892 (Died)
	Ward Hunt	Associate Justice	New York	Samuel Nelson	December 11, 1872 (Acclamation)	January 9, 1873 – January 27, 1882 (Retired)

== Citation style ==
Under the Judiciary Act of 1789, the federal court structure at the time comprised District Courts, which had general trial jurisdiction; Circuit Courts, which had mixed trial and appellate (from the US District Courts) jurisdiction; and the United States Supreme Court, which had appellate jurisdiction over the federal District and Circuit courts—and for certain issues over state courts. The Supreme Court also had limited original jurisdiction (i.e., in which cases could be filed directly with the Supreme Court without first having been heard by a lower federal or state court). There were one or more federal District Courts and/or Circuit Courts in each state, territory, or other geographical region.

Bluebook citation style is used for case names, citations, and jurisdictions.

- "C.C.D." = United States Circuit Court for the District of . . .
  - e.g.,"C.C.D.N.J." = United States Circuit Court for the District of New Jersey
- "D." = United States District Court for the District of . . .
  - e.g.,"D. Mass." = United States District Court for the District of Massachusetts
- "E." = Eastern; "M." = Middle; "N." = Northern; "S." = Southern; "W." = Western
  - e.g.,"C.C.S.D.N.Y." = United States Circuit Court for the Southern District of New York
  - e.g.,"M.D. Ala." = United States District Court for the Middle District of Alabama
- "Ct. Cl." = United States Court of Claims
- The abbreviation of a state's name alone indicates the highest appellate court in that state's judiciary at the time.
  - e.g.,"Pa." = Supreme Court of Pennsylvania
  - e.g.,"Me." = Supreme Judicial Court of Maine

== List of cases in 89 U.S. (22 Wall.) ==
Case Name	Page and year	Opinion of the Court	Concurring opinion(s)	Dissenting opinion(s)	Lower court	Disposition of case
Gill v. Wells	1 (1874)	Clifford	none	none	C.C.S.D.N.Y.	reversed
Mutual Life Insurance Company v. Newton	32 (1875)	Field	none	none	C.C.E.D. Mo.	reversed
Cary v. Savings Union	38 (1875)	Waite	none	none	C.C.D. Cal.	affirmed
House v. Mullen	42 (1875)	Miller	none	none	M.D. Ala.	reversed
Jeffries v. Economical Life Insurance Company	47 (1875)	Hunt	none	none	C.C.E.D. Mo.	affirmed
Scott v. Kelly	57 (1875)	Waite	none	none	N.Y. Sup. Ct.	dismissed
Putnam v. Day	60 (1875)	Bradley	none	none	C.C.D. Ind.	reversed
Ritchie v. Franklin County	67 (1875)	Davis	none	none	C.C.E.D. Mo.	affirmed
Maxwell v. Stewart	77 (1875)	Waite	none	none	N.M.	affirmed
Haycraft v. United States	81 (1875)	Waite	none	none	Ct. Cl.	affirmed
United States v. Home Insurance Company	99 (1875)	Strong	none	none	Ct. Cl.	affirmed
Maryland v. Baltimore and Ohio Railroad Company	105 (1874)	Strong	none	none	Md.	affirmed
Pleasants v. Fant	116 (1875)	Miller	none	none	C.C.D. Md.	affirmed
Ogdensburg and Lake Champlain Railroad Company v. Pratt	123 (1875)	Hunt	none	none	C.C.D. Mass.	affirmed
St. John v. Erie Railroad Company	136 (1875)	Swayne	none	none	C.C.S.D.N.Y.	affirmed
Sloan v. Lewis	150 (1875)	Waite	none	none	N.C.	affirmed
In re Chiles	157 (1875)	Miller	none	none	original	contempt citation
Burnhisel v. Firman	170 (1875)	Swayne	none	none	Sup. Ct Terr. Utah	reversed
Elgee Cotton Cases	180 (1875)	Strong	none	none	Ct. Cl.	reversed
Fretz v. Stover	198 (1875)	Davis	none	none	E.D. Va.	reversed
Sweeney v. Lomme	208 (1874)	Miller	none	none	Sup. Ct. Terr. Mont.	affirmed
Bailey v. Magwire	215 (1875)	Davis	none	none	C.C.E.D. Mo.	reversed
French v. Hay I	231 (1875)	Strong	none	none	Sup. Ct. D.C.	affirmed
French v. Hay II	238 (1875)	Swayne	none	none	C.C.E.D. Va.	affirmed
French v. Hay III	250 (1875)	Swayne	none	none	C.C.E.D. Va.	affirmed
Connoyer v. Schaeffer	254 (1875)	Davis	none	none	Mo.	affirmed
Hampton v. Rouse	263 (1875)	Clifford	none	none	C.C.S.D. Miss.	reversed
Mechanics' and Traders' Bank v. Union Bank	276 (1875)	Strong	none	Field	La.	affirmed
Gavinzel v. Crump	308 (1875)	Davis	none	none	C.C.E.D. Va.	reversed
Pittsburgh, Cincinnati, Chicago and St. Louis Railroad Company v. Ramsey	322 (1875)	Waite	none	none	C.C.N.D. Ill.	affirmed
Stephen v. Beall	329 (1875)	Hunt	none	none	Sup. Ct. D.C.	reversed
New Jersey Railroad Company v. Pollard	341 (1875)	Waite	none	none	C.C.D.N.J.	affirmed
Woodson v. Murdock	351 (1874)	Strong	none	Miller	C.C.W.D. Mo.	affirmed
Morgan v. Campbell	381 (1875)	Davis	none	none	C.C.N.D. Ill.	affirmed
Amsinck v. Bean	395 (1875)	Clifford	none	none	C.C.S.D.N.Y.	reversed
United States v. Farragut	406 (1875)	Miller	none	none	Sup. Ct. D.C.	reversed
Fox v. Seal	424 (1875)	Strong	none	none	C.C.W.D. Pa.	reversed
Union Pacific Railroad Company v. McShane	444 (1875)	Miller	none	none	C.C.D. Neb.	affirmed
Hunnewell v. Cass County	464 (1875)	Miller	none	none	C.C.D. Neb.	affirmed
Taylor v. Thomas	479 (1875)	Clifford	none	none	Miss.	affirmed
United States v. Saunders	492 (1875)	Bradley	none	none	Ct. Cl.	reversed
Piatt's Administrator v. United States	496 (1875)	Clifford	none	Bradley	Ct. Cl.	reversed
Robinson v. Elliott	513 (1875)	Davis	none	none	C.C.D. Ind.	affirmed
Tucker v. Ferguson	527 (1875)	Swayne	none	none	C.C.W.D. Mich.	affirmed
Ross v. Jones	576 (1875)	Clifford	none	none	C.C.E.D. Ark.	affirmed
Evansville and Crawfordsville Railroad Company v. Androscoggin Mills	594 (1874)	Hunt	none	none	C.C.D. Ind.	reversed
Bailey v. New York Central Railroad Company	604 (1875)	Clifford	none	none	C.C.N.D.N.Y.	reversed
United States v. O'Grady	641 (1875)	Clifford	none	none	Ct. Cl.	affirmed
