= List of United States Supreme Court cases, volume 183 =

Supreme Court of the United States
- Interactive map of Supreme Court of the United States
- 38°53′26″N 77°00′16″W
- Established: March 4, 1789; 236 years ago
- Location: Washington, D.C.
- Coordinates: 38°53′26″N 77°00′16″W
- Composition method: Presidential nomination with Senate confirmation
- Authorised by: Constitution of the United States, Art. III, § 1
- Judge term length: life tenure, subject to impeachment and removal
- Number of positions: 9 (by statute)
- Website: supremecourt.gov

This is a list of cases reported in volume 183 of United States Reports, decided by the Supreme Court of the United States in 1901 and 1902.

== Justices of the Supreme Court at the time of volume 183 U.S. ==
The Supreme Court is established by Article III, Section 1 of the Constitution of the United States, which says: "The judicial Power of the United States, shall be vested in one supreme Court . . .". The size of the Court is not specified; the Constitution leaves it to Congress to set the number of justices. Under the Judiciary Act of 1789 Congress originally fixed the number of justices at six (one chief justice and five associate justices). Since 1789 Congress has varied the size of the Court from six to seven, nine, ten, and back to nine justices (always including one chief justice).

When the cases in volume 183 were decided the Court comprised the following nine members:

Portrait	Justice	Office	Home State	Succeeded	Date confirmed by the Senate (Vote)	Tenure on Supreme Court
	Melville Fuller	Chief Justice	Illinois	Morrison Waite	July 20, 1888 (41–20)	October 8, 1888 – July 4, 1910 (Died)
	John Marshall Harlan	Associate Justice	Kentucky	David Davis	November 29, 1877 (Acclamation)	December 10, 1877 – October 14, 1911 (Died)
	Horace Gray	Associate Justice	Massachusetts	Nathan Clifford	December 20, 1881 (51–5)	January 9, 1882 – September 15, 1902 (Died)
	David Josiah Brewer	Associate Justice	Kansas	Stanley Matthews	December 18, 1889 (53–11)	January 6, 1890 – March 28, 1910 (Died)
	Henry Billings Brown	Associate Justice	Michigan	Samuel Freeman Miller	December 29, 1890 (Acclamation)	January 5, 1891 – May 28, 1906 (Retired)
	George Shiras Jr.	Associate Justice	Pennsylvania	Joseph P. Bradley	July 26, 1892 (Acclamation)	October 10, 1892 – February 23, 1903 (Retired)
	Edward Douglass White	Associate Justice	Louisiana	Samuel Blatchford	February 19, 1894 (Acclamation)	March 12, 1894 – December 18, 1910 (Continued as chief justice)
	Rufus W. Peckham	Associate Justice	New York	Howell Edmunds Jackson	December 9, 1895 (Acclamation)	January 6, 1896 – October 24, 1909 (Died)
	Joseph McKenna	Associate Justice	California	Stephen Johnson Field	January 21, 1898 (Acclamation)	January 26, 1898 – January 5, 1925 (Retired)

== Citation style ==
Under the Judiciary Act of 1789 the federal court structure at the time comprised District Courts, which had general trial jurisdiction; Circuit Courts, which had mixed trial and appellate (from the US District Courts) jurisdiction; and the United States Supreme Court, which had appellate jurisdiction over the federal District and Circuit courts—and for certain issues over state courts. The Supreme Court also had limited original jurisdiction (i.e., in which cases could be filed directly with the Supreme Court without first having been heard by a lower federal or state court). There were one or more federal District Courts and/or Circuit Courts in each state, territory, or other geographical region.

The Judiciary Act of 1891 created the United States Courts of Appeals and reassigned the jurisdiction of most routine appeals from the district and circuit courts to these appellate courts. The Act created nine new courts that were originally known as the "United States Circuit Courts of Appeals." The new courts had jurisdiction over most appeals of lower court decisions. The Supreme Court could review either legal issues that a court of appeals certified or decisions of court of appeals by writ of certiorari.

Bluebook citation style is used for case names, citations, and jurisdictions.

- "# Cir." = United States Court of Appeals
  - e.g., "3d Cir." = United States Court of Appeals for the Third Circuit
- "C.C.D." = United States Circuit Court for the District of . . .
  - e.g.,"C.C.D.N.J." = United States Circuit Court for the District of New Jersey
- "D." = United States District Court for the District of . . .
  - e.g.,"D. Mass." = United States District Court for the District of Massachusetts
- "E." = Eastern; "M." = Middle; "N." = Northern; "S." = Southern; "W." = Western
  - e.g.,"C.C.S.D.N.Y." = United States Circuit Court for the Southern District of New York
  - e.g.,"M.D. Ala." = United States District Court for the Middle District of Alabama
- "Ct. Cl." = United States Court of Claims
- The abbreviation of a state's name alone indicates the highest appellate court in that state's judiciary at the time.
  - e.g.,"Pa." = Supreme Court of Pennsylvania
  - e.g.,"Me." = Supreme Judicial Court of Maine

== List of cases in volume 183 U.S. ==
Case Name	Page and year	Opinion of the Court	Concurring opinion(s)	Dissenting opinion(s)	Lower Court	Disposition
Holzapfel's Compositions Company v. Rahtjen's American Composition Company	1 (1901)	Peckham	none	none	2d Cir.	reversed
Knoxville Iron Company v. Harbison	13 (1901)	Shiras	none	none	Tenn.	affirmed
Dayton Coal and Iron Company v. Barton	23 (1901)	Shiras	none	none	Tenn.	affirmed
McMaster v. New York Life Insurance Company	25 (1901)	Fuller	none	none	8th Cir.	reversed
Mitchell v. Potomac Insurance Company	42 (1901)	Peckham	none	none	D.C. Cir.	affirmed
Missouri, Kansas and Texas Railway Company v. Missouri Railroad and Warehouse Commissioners	53 (1901)	Brewer	none	none	Mo.	reversed
District of Columbia v. Eslin	62 (1901)	Harlan	none	none	Ct. Cl.	dismissed
Gulf and Ship Island Railroad Company v. Hewes	66 (1901)	Brown	none	none	Miss.	affirmed
Cotting v. Kansas City Stock Yards Company	79 (1901)	Brewer	Harlan	none	C.C.D. Kan.	reversed
Dinsmore v. Southern Express Company	115 (1901)	Harlan	none	none	5th Cir.	affirmed
Wilson v. Merchants' Loan and Trust Company	121 (1901)	Peckham	none	none	7th Cir.	affirmed
Haseltine v. Central National Bank I	130 (1901)	Brown	none	none	Mo.	dismissed
Haseltine v. Central National Bank II	132 (1901)	Brown	none	none	Mo.	affirmed
Storti v. Massachusetts	138 (1901)	Brewer	none	none	C.C.D. Mass.	affirmed
Pinney v. Nelson	144 (1901)	Brewer	none	none	Cal. Super. Ct.	affirmed
Dooley v. United States	151 (1901)	Brown	White	Fuller	C.C.S.D.N.Y.	affirmed
14 Diamond Rings v. United States	176 (1901)	Fuller	Brown	none	N.D. Ill.	reversed
Arkansas v. Kansas and Texas Coal Company	185 (1901)	Fuller	none	none	C.C.W.D. Ark.	reversed
Wilson Brothers v. Nelson	191 (1901)	Gray	none	Shiras	7th Cir.	certification
National Foundry and Pipe Works v. Oconto Water Supply Company	216 (1902)	White	none	none	Wis.	affirmed
Capital City Dairy Company v. Ohio	238 (1902)	White	none	none	Ohio	affirmed
Greene v. Henkel	249 (1902)	Peckham	none	none	C.C.S.D.N.Y.	affirmed
The Kensington	263 (1902)	White	none	none	2d Cir.	reversed
Orr v. Gilman	278 (1902)	Shiras	none	none	N.Y. Cnty. Sur. Ct.	affirmed
Schrimpscher v. Stockton	290 (1902)	Brown	none	none	Kan.	affirmed
Gallup v. Schmidt	300 (1902)	Shiras	none	none	Ind. Cir. Ct.	affirmed
Northern Assurance Company v. Grand View Building Association	308 (1902)	Shiras	none	none	8th Cir.	reversed
Carter v. McClaughry	365 (1902)	Fuller	none	none	C.C.D. Kan.	affirmed
Guarantee Company of North America v. Mechanics Savings Bank and Trust Company	402 (1902)	Fuller	none	none	6th Cir.	reversed
Tucker v. Alexandroff	424 (1902)	Brown	Peckham	Gray	3d Cir.	reversed
Florida Central and Peninsular Railroad Company v. Reynolds	471 (1902)	Brewer	none	Brown	Fla.	affirmed
McChord v. City of Cincinnati	483 (1902)	Fuller	none	none	C.C.D. Ky.	reversed
Louisville and Nashville Railroad Company v. Kentucky	503 (1902)	Shiras	none	none	Ky.	affirmed
Southern Pacific Railroad Company v. United States	519 (1902)	Brewer	none	none	9th Cir.	reversed
United States Trust Company v. New Mexico	535 (1902)	Brewer	none	none	Sup. Ct. Terr. N.M.	affirmed
Ex parte Wilder's Steamship Company	545 (1902)	Gray	none	none	9th Cir.	mandamus denied
Nutting v. Massachusetts	553 (1902)	Gray	none	Harlan	Mass. Super. Ct.	affirmed
Minder v. Georgia	559 (1902)	Fuller	none	none	Ga. Super. Ct.	affirmed
McKinley Creek Mining Company v. Alaska United Mining Company	563 (1902)	McKenna	none	none	D. Alaska	affirmed
Maese v. Herman	572 (1902)	McKenna	none	none	D.C. Cir.	affirmed
Chicago, Rock Island and Pacific Railroad Company v. Zernecke	582 (1902)	McKenna	none	none	Neb.	affirmed
Chicago, Rock Island and Pacific Railroad Company v. Eaton	589 (1902)	McKenna	none	none	Neb.	affirmed
United States Repair and Guarantee Company v. Assyrian Asphalt Company	591 (1902)	McKenna	none	none	7th Cir.	affirmed
Midway Company v. Eaton I	602 (1902)	McKenna	none	none	Minn.	affirmed
Midway Company v. Eaton II	619 (1902)	McKenna	none	none	Minn.	affirmed
Texas and Pacific Railway Company v. Reiss	621 (1902)	Peckham	none	none	2d Cir.	affirmed
Texas and Pacific Railway Company v. Callender	632 (1902)	Peckham	none	none	2d Cir.	affirmed
Sun Printing and Publishing Association v. Moore	642 (1902)	White	none	none	2d Cir.	affirmed
Southern Pacific Railroad Company v. Bell	675 (1902)	Brown	none	none	Cal.	affirmed
Groeck v. Southern Pacific Railroad Company	690 (1902)	Brown	none	none	9th Cir.	reversed

== See also ==
- Certificate of division
