= List of United States Supreme Court cases, volume 47 =

Supreme Court of the United States
- Interactive map of Supreme Court of the United States
- 38°53′26″N 77°00′16″W
- Established: March 4, 1789; 236 years ago
- Location: Washington, D.C.
- Coordinates: 38°53′26″N 77°00′16″W
- Composition method: Presidential nomination with Senate confirmation
- Authorised by: Constitution of the United States, Art. III, § 1
- Judge term length: life tenure, subject to impeachment and removal
- Number of positions: 9 (by statute)
- Website: supremecourt.gov

This is a list of cases reported in volume 47 (6 How.) of United States Reports, decided by the Supreme Court of the United States from December 1847 to March 1848.

== Nominative reports ==
In 1874, the U.S. government created the United States Reports, and retroactively numbered older privately-published case reports as part of the new series. As a result, cases appearing in volumes 1–90 of U.S. Reports have dual citation forms; one for the volume number of U.S. Reports, and one for the volume number of the reports named for the relevant reporter of decisions (these are called "nominative reports").

=== Benjamin Chew Howard ===
Starting with the 42nd volume of U.S. Reports, the Reporter of Decisions of the Supreme Court of the United States was Benjamin Chew Howard. Howard was Reporter of Decisions from 1843 to 1860, covering volumes 42 through 65 of United States Reports which correspond to volumes 1 through 24 of his Howard's Reports. As such, the dual form of citation to, for example, Stacy v. Thrasher ex rel. Sellers is 47 U.S. (6 How.) 44 (1848).

== Justices of the Supreme Court at the time of 47 U.S. (6 How.) ==
The Supreme Court is established by Article III, Section 1 of the Constitution of the United States, which says: "The judicial Power of the United States, shall be vested in one supreme Court . . .". The size of the Court is not specified; the Constitution leaves it to Congress to set the number of justices. Under the Judiciary Act of 1789 Congress originally fixed the number of justices at six (one chief justice and five associate justices). Since 1789 Congress has varied the size of the Court from six to seven, nine, ten, and back to nine justices (always including one chief justice).

When the cases in 47 U.S. (6 How.) were decided the Court comprised these nine members:

Portrait	Justice	Office	Home State	Succeeded	Date confirmed by the Senate (Vote)	Tenure on Supreme Court
	Roger B. Taney	Chief Justice	Maryland	John Marshall	March 15, 1836 (29–15)	March 28, 1836 – October 12, 1864 (Died)
	John McLean	Associate Justice	Ohio	Robert Trimble	March 7, 1829 (Acclamation)	January 11, 1830 – April 4, 1861 (Died)
	James Moore Wayne	Associate Justice	Georgia	William Johnson	January 9, 1835 (Acclamation)	January 14, 1835 – July 5, 1867 (Died)
	John Catron	Associate Justice	Tennessee	newly created seat	March 8, 1837 (28–15)	May 1, 1837 – May 30, 1865 (Died)
	John McKinley	Associate Justice	Alabama	newly created seat	September 25, 1837 (Acclamation)	January 9, 1838 – July 19, 1852 (Died)
	Peter Vivian Daniel	Associate Justice	Virginia	Philip P. Barbour	March 2, 1841 (25–5)	January 10, 1842 – May 31, 1860 (Died)
	Samuel Nelson	Associate Justice	New York	Smith Thompson	February 14, 1845 (Acclamation)	February 27, 1845 – November 28, 1872 (Retired)
	Levi Woodbury	Associate Justice	New Hampshire	Joseph Story	January 31, 1846 (Acclamation)	September 23, 1845 – September 4, 1851 (Died)
	Robert Cooper Grier	Associate Justice	Pennsylvania	Henry Baldwin	August 4, 1846 (Acclamation)	August 10, 1846 – January 31, 1870 (Retired)

== Citation style ==
Under the Judiciary Act of 1789 the federal court structure at the time comprised District Courts, which had general trial jurisdiction; Circuit Courts, which had mixed trial and appellate (from the US District Courts) jurisdiction; and the United States Supreme Court, which had appellate jurisdiction over the federal District and Circuit courts—and for certain issues over state courts. The Supreme Court also had limited original jurisdiction (i.e., in which cases could be filed directly with the Supreme Court without first having been heard by a lower federal or state court). There were one or more federal District Courts and/or Circuit Courts in each state, territory, or other geographical region.

Bluebook citation style is used for case names, citations, and jurisdictions.

- "C.C.D." = United States Circuit Court for the District of . . .
  - e.g.,"C.C.D.N.J." = United States Circuit Court for the District of New Jersey
- "D." = United States District Court for the District of . . .
  - e.g.,"D. Mass." = United States District Court for the District of Massachusetts
- "E." = Eastern; "M." = Middle; "N." = Northern; "S." = Southern; "W." = Western
  - e.g.,"C.C.S.D.N.Y." = United States Circuit Court for the Southern District of New York
  - e.g.,"M.D. Ala." = United States District Court for the Middle District of Alabama
- "Ct. Cl." = United States Court of Claims
- The abbreviation of a state's name alone indicates the highest appellate court in that state's judiciary at the time.
  - e.g.,"Pa." = Supreme Court of Pennsylvania
  - e.g.,"Me." = Supreme Judicial Court of Maine

== List of cases in 47 U.S. (6 How.) ==
Case Name	Page & year	Opinion of the Court	Concurring opinion(s)	Dissenting opinion(s)	Lower Court	Disposition
Sims v. Hundley	1 (1847)	Taney	none	none	C.C.S.D. Miss.	affirmed
Gwin v. Barton	7 (1847)	Taney	none	none	C.C.S.D. Miss.	reversed
United States v. Daniel	11 (1847)	McLean	none	none	C.C.D.N.C.	certification
Collier v. Stanbrough	14 (1847)	Catron	none	none	La.	affirmed
Bailey v. Dozier	23 (1848)	Nelson	none	none	C.C.S.D. Miss.	reversed
Bank of the U.S. v. Moss	31 (1847)	Woodbury	none	none	C.C.S.D. Miss.	reversed
Nesmith v. Sheldon	41 (1848)	Taney	none	none	C.C.D. Mich.	certification
Stacy v. Thrasher ex rel. Sellers	44 (1848)	Grier	none	none	C.C.E.D. La.	reversed
van Ness v. van Ness	62 (1848)	Taney	none	none	C.C.D.C.	dismissed
Marshall v. Beall	70 (1848)	Catron	none	none	C.C.D.C.	reversed
Villabolos v. United States	81 (1848)	Taney	none	none	Fla. Super. Ct.	dismissed
Brashear v. Mason	92 (1848)	Nelson	none	none	C.C.D.C.	affirmed
De Armas's Heirs v. United States	103 (1848)	Taney	none	none	D. La.	dismissed
United States v. Curry	106 (1848)	Taney	none	none	D. La.	dismissed
Davis v. Tileston & Co.	114 (1848)	Woodbury	none	none	N.D. Miss.	reversed
Mathewson v. Clarke	122 (1848)	McLean	none	none	C.C.D.R.I.	reversed
Curtis v. Innerarity	146 (1848)	Grier	none	none	Ct. App. Terr. Fla.	affirmed
Shelton v. Tiffin	163 (1848)	McLean	none	none	C.C.E.D. La.	reversed
Pease v. Dwight	190 (1848)	Wayne	none	none	C.C.D. Mich.	affirmed
Forgay v. Conrad	201 (1848)	Taney	none	none	C.C.D. La.	dismissal denied
Perkins v. Fourniquet	206 (1848)	Taney	none	none	C.C.D. La.	dismissed
Pulliam v. Christian	209 (1848)	McLean	none	none	C.C.E.D. Va.	dismissed
Bank of the Metropolis v. New Eng. Bank	212 (1848)	Taney	none	none	C.C.D.C.	reversed
Bein v. Heath	228 (1848)	McLean	none	none	C.C.E.D. La.	affirmed
Bowling v. Harrison	248 (1848)	Grier	none	none	C.C.S.D. Miss.	affirmed
Sheppard v. Wilson	260 (1848)	Grier	none	none	Sup. Ct. Terr. Iowa	affirmed
United States v. Hodge	279 (1848)	McLean	none	none	C.C.E.D. La.	reversed
Bush v. Marshall	284 (1848)	Grier	none	none	Sup. Ct. Terr. Iowa	affirmed
McMicken v. Webb	292 (1848)	Daniel	none	none	C.C.E.D. La.	affirmed
Planters' Bank v. Sharp	301 (1848)	Woodbury	none	none	Miss.	reversed
New Jersey S.N. Co. v. Merchants' Bank	344 (1848)	Nelson	Catron, Woodbury	Daniel	C.C.D.R.I.	affirmed
Hogg v. Emerson	437 (1848)	Woodbury	none	none	C.C.S.D.N.Y.	affirmed
Houston v. City Bank	486 (1848)	Taney	none	none	La.	reversed
West R.B. Co. v. Dix	507 (1848)	Daniel	McLean, Woodbury	none	Vt.	affirmed
Patterson v. Gaines	550 (1848)	Wayne	none	none	C.C.E.D. La.	reversed
United States v. Yates	605 (1848)	Taney	none	none	D. La.	appearance struck

== See also ==
- Certificate of division
