= List of United States Supreme Court cases, volume 139 =

Supreme Court of the United States
- Interactive map of Supreme Court of the United States
- 38°53′26″N 77°00′16″W
- Established: March 4, 1789; 236 years ago
- Location: Washington, D.C.
- Coordinates: 38°53′26″N 77°00′16″W
- Composition method: Presidential nomination with Senate confirmation
- Authorised by: Constitution of the United States, Art. III, § 1
- Judge term length: life tenure, subject to impeachment and removal
- Number of positions: 9 (by statute)
- Website: supremecourt.gov

This is a list of cases reported in volume 139 of United States Reports, decided by the Supreme Court of the United States in 1891.

== Justices of the Supreme Court at the time of volume 139 U.S. ==
The Supreme Court is established by Article III, Section 1 of the Constitution of the United States, which says: "The judicial Power of the United States, shall be vested in one supreme Court . . .". The size of the Court is not specified; the Constitution leaves it to Congress to set the number of justices. Under the Judiciary Act of 1789 Congress originally fixed the number of justices at six (one chief justice and five associate justices). Since 1789 Congress has varied the size of the Court from six to seven, nine, ten, and back to nine justices (always including one chief justice).

When the cases in volume 139 U.S. were decided the Court comprised the following nine members:

Portrait	Justice	Office	Home State	Succeeded	Date confirmed by the Senate (Vote)	Tenure on Supreme Court
	Melville Fuller	Chief Justice	Illinois	Morrison Waite	July 20, 1888 (41–20)	October 8, 1888 – July 4, 1910 (Died)
	Stephen Johnson Field	Associate Justice	California	newly created seat	March 10, 1863 (Acclamation)	May 10, 1863 – December 1, 1897 (Retired)
	Joseph P. Bradley	Associate Justice	New Jersey	newly created seat	March 21, 1870 (46–9)	March 23, 1870 – January 22, 1892 (Died)
	John Marshall Harlan	Associate Justice	Kentucky	David Davis	November 29, 1877 (Acclamation)	December 10, 1877 – October 14, 1911 (Died)
	Horace Gray	Associate Justice	Massachusetts	Nathan Clifford	December 20, 1881 (51–5)	January 9, 1882 – September 15, 1902 (Died)
	Samuel Blatchford	Associate Justice	New York	Ward Hunt	March 22, 1882 (Acclamation)	April 3, 1882 – July 7, 1893 (Died)
	Lucius Quintus Cincinnatus Lamar	Associate Justice	Mississippi	William Burnham Woods	January 16, 1888 (32–28)	January 18, 1888 – January 23, 1893 (Died)
	David Josiah Brewer	Associate Justice	Kansas	Stanley Matthews	December 18, 1889 (53–11)	January 6, 1890 – March 28, 1910 (Died)
	Henry Billings Brown	Associate Justice	Michigan	Samuel Freeman Miller	December 29, 1890 (Acclamation)	January 5, 1891 – May 28, 1906 (Retired)

== Citation style ==
Under the Judiciary Act of 1789 the federal court structure at the time comprised District Courts, which had general trial jurisdiction; Circuit Courts, which had mixed trial and appellate (from the US District Courts) jurisdiction; and the United States Supreme Court, which had appellate jurisdiction over the federal District and Circuit courts—and for certain issues over state courts. The Supreme Court also had limited original jurisdiction (i.e., in which cases could be filed directly with the Supreme Court without first having been heard by a lower federal or state court). There were one or more federal District Courts and/or Circuit Courts in each state, territory, or other geographical region.

The Judiciary Act of 1891 created the United States Courts of Appeals and reassigned the jurisdiction of most routine appeals from the district and circuit courts to these appellate courts. The Act created nine new courts that were originally known as the "United States Circuit Courts of Appeals." The new courts had jurisdiction over most appeals of lower court decisions. The Supreme Court could review either legal issues that a court of appeals certified or decisions of court of appeals by writ of certiorari. The change resulted in an immediate reduction in the Supreme Court's workload (from 623 cases filed in 1890 to 379 in 1891 and 275 in 1892).

Bluebook citation style is used for case names, citations, and jurisdictions.

- "# Cir." = United States Court of Appeals
  - e.g., "3d Cir." = United States Court of Appeals for the Third Circuit
- "C.C.D." = United States Circuit Court for the District of . . .
  - e.g.,"C.C.D.N.J." = United States Circuit Court for the District of New Jersey
- "D." = United States District Court for the District of . . .
  - e.g.,"D. Mass." = United States District Court for the District of Massachusetts
- "E." = Eastern; "M." = Middle; "N." = Northern; "S." = Southern; "W." = Western
  - e.g.,"C.C.S.D.N.Y." = United States Circuit Court for the Southern District of New York
  - e.g.,"M.D. Ala." = United States District Court for the Middle District of Alabama
- "Ct. Cl." = United States Court of Claims
- The abbreviation of a state's name alone indicates the highest appellate court in that state's judiciary at the time.
  - e.g.,"Pa." = Supreme Court of Pennsylvania
  - e.g.,"Me." = Supreme Judicial Court of Maine

== List of cases in volume 139 U.S. ==
Case Name	Page and year	Opinion of the Court	Concurring opinion(s)	Dissenting opinion(s)	Lower Court	Disposition
St. Paul and Pacific Railroad Company v. Northern Pacific Railway Company	1 (1891)	Field	none	none	C.C.D. Minn.	affirmed
MSt. Paul, Minneapolis and Manitoba Railway Company v. Greenalgh	19 (1891)	Field	none	none	C.C.D. Minn.	affirmed
St. Paul, Minneapolis and Manitoba Railway Company v. Wenzel	23 (1891)	Field	none	none	C.C.D. Minn.	affirmed
Central Transportation Company v. Pullman Palace Car Company	24 (1891)	Gray	none	none	C.C.E.D. Pa.	affirmed
Pullman Palace Car Company v. Central Transportation Company	62 (1891)	Gray	none	none	C.C.E.D. Pa.	reversed
Logan County National Bank v. Townsend	67 (1891)	Harlan	none	none	Ky.	affirmed
Chicago, St. Louis and New Orleans Railroad Company v. Pullman Southern Car Company	79 (1891)	Harlan	none	none	C.C.E.D. La.	reversed
Clark v. Bever	96 (1891)	Harlan	none	none	C.C.S.D. Iowa	affirmed
Fogg v. Blair	118 (1891)	Harlan	none	none	C.C.E.D. Mo.	affirmed
Covington Stock Yards Company v. Keith	128 (1891)	Harlan	none	none	C.C.D. Ky.	affirmed
Guaranty Trust and Safe Deposit Company v. Green Cove Springs and Melrose Railroad Company	137 (1891)	Brown	none	none	C.C.N.D. Fla.	reversed
Stout v. Mastin	151 (1891)	Brewer	none	Brown	C.C.D. Kan.	affirmed
Johnson v. Powers	156 (1891)	Gray	none	Brown	C.C.N.D.N.Y.	affirmed
King v. Doane	166 (1891)	Harlan	none	none	C.C.D. Minn.	affirmed
Stockmeyer v. Tobin	176 (1891)	Harlan	none	none	C.C.E.D. La.	affirmed
Callan v. Bransford	197 (1891)	Fuller	none	none	Va.	dismissed
Howard v. Stillwell and Bierce Manufacturing Company	199 (1891)	Lamar	none	none	C.C.N.D. Tex.	affirmed
Bayne v. Wiggins	210 (1891)	Gray	none	none	C.C.W.D. Pa.	affirmed
Northwestern Fuel Company v. Brock	216 (1891)	Field	Brewer	none	C.C.N.D. Iowa	affirmed
British Queen Mining Company v. Baker Silver Mining Company	222 (1891)	Fuller	none	none	C.C.D. Colo.	affirmed
St. Louis, Iron Mountain and Southern Railway Company v. Commercial Union Insurance Company	223 (1891)	Gray	none	none	C.C.E.D. Ark.	reversed
Manchester v. Massachusetts	240 (1891)	Blatchford	none	none	Mass. Super. Ct.	affirmed
Etheridge v. Sperry	266 (1891)	Brewer	none	none	Iowa	affirmed
United States v. Brewer	278 (1891)	Blatchford	none	none	C.C.W.D. Tenn.	certification
East Tennessee, Virginia and Georgia Railway Company v. Frazier	288 (1891)	Brewer	none	none	Tenn.	affirmed
Walter A. Wood Mowing and Reaping Machine Company v. Skinner	293 (1891)	Brown	none	none	N.Y. Sup. Ct.	dismissed
Mutual Reserve Fund Life Association v. Hamlin	297 (1891)	Harlan	none	none	C.C.D. Conn.	affirmed
United States ex rel. Boynton v. Blaine	306 (1891)	Fuller	none	none	Sup. Ct. D.C.	affirmed
Hoff v. Iron Clad Manufacturing Company	326 (1891)	Brown	none	none	C.C.S.D.N.Y.	affirmed
The Sydney	331 (1891)	Blatchford	none	none	C.C.S.D.N.Y.	dismissed
Worthington v. Robbins	337 (1891)	Blatchford	none	none	C.C.D. Mass.	affirmed
Peake v. City of New Orleans	342 (1891)	Brewer	none	Harlan	C.C.E.D. La.	affirmed
Timmons v. Elyton Land Company	378 (1891)	Fuller	none	none	C.C.N.D. Ala.	reversed
Underwood v. Dugan	380 (1891)	Brewer	none	none	C.C.N.D. Tex.	affirmed
Dolan v. Jennings	385 (1891)	Fuller	none	none	C.C.S.D.N.Y.	dismissed
Mellen v. Buckner	388 (1891)	Bradley	none	none	C.C.E.D. La.	reversed
Handley v. Stutz	417 (1891)	Brown	none	Fuller	C.C.M.D. Tenn.	reversed
Talbott v. Silver Bow County	438 (1891)	Brewer	none	none	Sup. Ct. Terr. Mont.	affirmed
In re Duncan	449 (1891)	Fuller	none	none	C.C.W.D. Tex.	affirmed
Leeper v. Texas	462 (1891)	Fuller	none	none	Tex. Civ. App.	affirmed
Delaware, Lackawanna and Western Railroad Company v. Converse	469 (1891)	Harlan	none	none	C.C.D.N.J.	affirmed
Snyder v. Fiedler	478 (1891)	Harlan	none	none	C.C.D. Mass.	affirmed
Electric Gas Lighting Company v. Boston Electric Company	481 (1891)	Blatchford	none	none	C.C.D. Mass.	affirmed
Electric Gas Lighting Company v. Tillotson	503 (1891)	Blatchford	none	none	C.C.D. Mass.	affirmed
In re Manning	504 (1891)	Gray	none	none	Wis.	affirmed
Davis's Administrator v. Wiebbold	507 (1891)	Field	none	none	Sup. Ct. Terr. Mont.	reversed
Union Edge Setter Company v. Keith	530 (1891)	Brown	none	none	C.C.D. Mass.	affirmed
Brown Chemical Company v. Meyer Brothers and Company	540 (1891)	Brown	none	none	C.C.E.D. Mo.	affirmed
Surnames cannot be trademarked, but neither can they be used to deceive the public; Infringement requires evidence of fraudulent intent.
In re Ingalls	548 (1891)	per curiam	none	none	not indicated	dismissed
Fowler v. Hamill	549 (1891)	Fuller	none	none	C.C.S.D.N.Y.	dismissed
Inland Seaboard Coasting Company v. Tolson	551 (1891)	Gray	none	none	Sup. Ct. D.C.	affirmed
Selma, Rome and Dalton Railroad Company v. United States	560 (1891)	Harlan	none	none	Ct. Cl.	affirmed
Interstate Land Company v. Maxwell Land Grant Company	569 (1891)	Lamar	none	none	C.C.D. Colo.	affirmed
Shelton v. Platt	591 (1891)	Fuller	none	none	C.C.E.D. Tenn.	reversed
Western Electric Company v. La Rue	601 (1891)	Brown	none	none	C.C.S.D.N.Y.	affirmed
Seeberger v. Farwell and Company	608 (1891)	Blatchford	none	none	C.C.N.D. Ill.	affirmed
Magone v. Luckemeyer	612 (1891)	Blatchford	none	Brown	C.C.S.D.N.Y.	affirmed
Wilson v. Everett	616 (1891)	Blatchford	none	none	C.C.D. Colo.	affirmed
Natal v. Louisiana	621 (1891)	Gray	none	none	La.	affirmed
Mason v. Robertson	624 (1891)	Gray	none	none	C.C.S.D.N.Y.	reversed
Bock v. Perkins	628 (1891)	Harlan	none	none	C.C.N.D. Iowa	affirmed
Sanford v. Sanford	642 (1891)	Field	none	none	Or.	affirmed
Davis v. Texas	651 (1891)	Fuller	none	none	Tex. Civ. App.	dismissed
Allen v. Pullman's Palace Car Company	658 (1891)	Fuller	none	none	C.C.M.D. Tenn.	reversed
Bybee v. Oregon and California Railroad Company	663 (1891)	Brown	none	none	C.C.D. Or.	affirmed
Boone County v. Burlington and Missouri River Railroad Company	684 (1891)	Blatchford	none	none	C.C.D. Neb.	affirmed
Redfield v. Bartels	694 (1891)	Fuller	none	none	C.C.S.D.N.Y.	reversed
