= List of United States Supreme Court cases, volume 44 =

Supreme Court of the United States
- Interactive map of Supreme Court of the United States
- 38°53′26″N 77°00′16″W
- Established: March 4, 1789; 237 years ago
- Location: Washington, D.C.
- Coordinates: 38°53′26″N 77°00′16″W
- Composition method: Presidential nomination with Senate confirmation
- Authorised by: Constitution of the United States, Art. III, § 1
- Judge term length: life tenure, subject to impeachment and removal
- Number of positions: 9 (by statute)
- Website: supremecourt.gov

This is a list of cases reported in volume 44 (3 How.) of United States Reports, decided by the Supreme Court of the United States in 1844 and 1845.

== Nominative reports ==
In 1874, the U.S. government created the United States Reports, and retroactively numbered older privately published case reports as part of the new series. As a result, cases appearing in volumes 1–90 of U.S. Reports have dual citation forms; one for the volume number of U.S. Reports, and one for the volume number of the reports named for the relevant reporter of decisions (these are called "nominative reports").

=== Benjamin Chew Howard ===
Starting with the 42nd volume of U.S. Reports, the Reporter of Decisions of the Supreme Court of the United States was Benjamin Chew Howard. Howard was Reporter of Decisions from 1843 to 1860, covering volumes 42 through 65 of United States Reports which correspond to volumes 1 through 24 of his Howard's Reports. As such, the dual form of citation to, for example, Kendall v. Stokes is 44 U.S. (3 How.) 87 (1845).

== Justices of the Supreme Court at the time of 44 U.S. (3 How.) ==
The Supreme Court is established by Article III, Section 1 of the Constitution of the United States, which says: "The judicial Power of the United States, shall be vested in one supreme Court . . .". The size of the Court is not specified; the Constitution leaves it to Congress to set the number of justices. Under the Judiciary Act of 1789 Congress originally fixed the number of justices at six (one chief justice and five associate justices). Since 1789 Congress has varied the size of the Court from six to seven, nine, ten, and back to nine justices (always including one chief justice).

When the cases in 44 U.S. (3 How.) were decided, however, due to an unfilled vacancy the Court comprised only these eight members:

Portrait	Justice	Office	Home State	Succeeded	Date confirmed by the Senate (Vote)	Tenure on Supreme Court
	Roger B. Taney	Chief Justice	Maryland	John Marshall	March 15, 1836 (29–15)	March 28, 1836 – October 12, 1864 (Died)
	Joseph Story	Associate Justice	Massachusetts	William Cushing	November 18, 1811 (Acclamation)	February 3, 1812 – September 10, 1845 (Died)
	John McLean	Associate Justice	Ohio	Robert Trimble	March 7, 1829 (Acclamation)	January 11, 1830 – April 4, 1861 (Died)
	James Moore Wayne	Associate Justice	Georgia	William Johnson	January 9, 1835 (Acclamation)	January 14, 1835 – July 5, 1867 (Died)
	John Catron	Associate Justice	Tennessee	newly created seat	March 8, 1837 (28–15)	May 1, 1837 – May 30, 1865 (Died)
	John McKinley	Associate Justice	Alabama	newly created seat	September 25, 1837 (Acclamation)	January 9, 1838 – July 19, 1852 (Died)
	Peter Vivian Daniel	Associate Justice	Virginia	Philip P. Barbour	March 2, 1841 (25–5)	January 10, 1842 – May 31, 1860 (Died)
	Samuel Nelson	Associate Justice	New York	Smith Thompson	February 14, 1845 (Acclamation)	February 27, 1845 – November 28, 1872 (Retired)

== Citation style ==
Under the Judiciary Act of 1789 the federal court structure at the time comprised District Courts, which had general trial jurisdiction; Circuit Courts, which had mixed trial and appellate (from the US District Courts) jurisdiction; and the United States Supreme Court, which had appellate jurisdiction over the federal District and Circuit courts—and for certain issues over state courts. The Supreme Court also had limited original jurisdiction (i.e., in which cases could be filed directly with the Supreme Court without first having been heard by a lower federal or state court). There were one or more federal District Courts and/or Circuit Courts in each state, territory, or other geographical region.

Bluebook citation style is used for case names, citations, and jurisdictions.

- "C.C.D." = United States Circuit Court for the District of . . .
  - e.g.,"C.C.D.N.J." = United States Circuit Court for the District of New Jersey
- "D." = United States District Court for the District of . . .
  - e.g.,"D. Mass." = United States District Court for the District of Massachusetts
- "E." = Eastern; "M." = Middle; "N." = Northern; "S." = Southern; "W." = Western
  - e.g.,"C.C.S.D.N.Y." = United States Circuit Court for the Southern District of New York
  - e.g.,"M.D. Ala." = United States District Court for the Middle District of Alabama
- "Ct. Cl." = United States Court of Claims
- The abbreviation of a state's name alone indicates the highest appellate court in that state's judiciary at the time.
  - e.g.,"Pa." = Supreme Court of Pennsylvania
  - e.g.,"Me." = Supreme Judicial Court of Maine

== List of cases in 44 U.S. (3 How.) ==
Case Name	Page and year	Opinion of the Court	Concurring opinion(s)	Dissenting opinion(s)	Lower Court	Disposition
Aldridge v. Williams	9 (1844)	Taney	none	McLean	C.C.D. Md.	affirmed
Barry v. Gamble	32 (1845)	Catron	none	McKinley	Mo.	affirmed
Dickson v. Wilkinson	57 (1844)	McKinley	none	none	C.C.M.D. Tenn.	certification
Walker v. Bank of Washington	62 (1844)	Wayne	none	none	C.C.D.C.	affirmed
Henderson v. Anderson	73 (1844)	Daniel	none	none	C.C.E.D. La.	affirmed
Poultney v. City of Lafayette	81 (1844)	McLean	none	none	C.C.E.D. La.	reversed
Kendall v. Stokes	87 (1845)	Taney	none	McLean	C.C.D.C.	reversed
Ex parte Dorr	103 (1844)	McLean	none	none	original	habeas corpus denied
Curtis v. Martin	106 (1845)	Taney	none	none	C.C.S.D.N.Y.	affirmed
Swartwout v. Gihon	110 (1845)	Taney	none	none	C.C.S.D.N.Y.	affirmed
Waller's Lessee v. Best	111 (1845)	Taney	none	none	C.C.D. Ky.	certification
United States v. Gear	120 (1845)	Wayne	none	McLean	C.C.D. Ill.	certification
Gordon v. Appeal Tax Court	133 (1845)	Wayne	none	none	Md.	reversed
Searight v. Stokes	151 (1845)	Taney	none	McLean, Daniel	C.C.W.D. Pa.	affirmed
Croghan's Lessee v. Nelson	187 (1845)	McKinley	none	McLean	C.C.D. Ky.	certification
Taylor v. United States	197 (1845)	Story	none	none	C.C.E.D. Pa.	affirmed
Pollard's Lessee v. Hagan	212 (1845)	McKinley	none	Catron	Ala.	affirmed
Cary v. Curtis	236 (1845)	Daniel	none	Story, McLean	C.C.S.D.N.Y.	certification
White v. Nicholls	266 (1845)	Daniel	none	none	C.C.D.C.	reversed
Ex parte Christy	292 (1844)	Story	none	Catron, Baldwin	D. La.	prohibition denied
Oliver v. Piatt	333 (1845)	Story	none	none	C.C.D. Ohio	affirmed
Washington Bridge Company v. Stewart	413 (1845)	Wayne	none	none	C.C.D.C.	affirmed
Nugent v. Boyd	426 (1845)	Taney	none	Catron	C.C.E.D. La.	affirmed
Carroll v. Safford	441 (1845)	McLean	none	none	C.C.D. Mich.	certification
Lane v. Vick	464 (1845)	McLean	none	McKinley	C.C.S.D. Miss.	reversed
Black v. J.W. Zacharie Company	483 (1845)	Story	none	none	C.C.E.D. La.	reversed
Camden v. Doremus	515 (1845)	Daniel	none	none	C.C.D. Mo.	affirmed
United States v. Hodge	534 (1845)	Taney	none	none	C.C.E.D. La.	dismissed
Maryland v. Baltimore and Ohio Railroad Company	534 (1845)	Taney	none	none	Md.	affirmed
Stimpson v. West Chester Railroad Company	553 (1845)	Taney	none	none	C.C.E.D. Pa.	certiorari denied
United States v. Freeman	556 (1845)	Wayne	none	none	C.C.D. Mass.	certification
Andrews v. Wall	568 (1845)	Story	none	none	Ct. App. Terr. Fla.	affirmed
Bonnafee v. Williams	574 (1845)	McLean	none	none	C.C.S.D. Miss.	reversed
United States v. Prescott	578 (1845)	McLean	none	none	C.C.D. Ill.	certification
Permoli v. City of New Orleans	589 (1845)	Catron	none	none	New Orleans City Ct.	dismissed
Chaires v. United States	611 (1845)	Catron	none	none	Fla. Super. Ct.	dismissed
United States v. Marvin	620 (1845)	Catron	none	none	Fla. Super. Ct.	reversed
Price ex rel. Gaulley v. Sessions	624 (1845)	Catron	none	none	C.C.S.D. Miss.	affirmed
Daviess v. Fairbairn	636 (1845)	McLean	none	none	C.C.D. Ky.	reversed
Brown's Lessee v. Clements	650 (1845)	McKinley	none	Catron	Ala.	reversed
Clymer's Lessee v. Dawkins	674 (1845)	Story	none	none	C.C.D. Ky.	affirmed
Brockett v. Brockett	691 (1845)	McLean	none	none	C.C.D.C.	affirmed
McDonogh v. Millaudon	693 (1845)	Catron	none	none	La.	dismissed
Gantly's Lessee v. Ewing	707 (1845)	Catron	none	none	C.C.D. Ind.	certification
McFarland v. Gwin	717 (1845)	McKinley	none	none	C.C.S.D. Miss.	reversed
Neil Moore and Company v. Ohio	720 (1845)	Taney	none	Daniel	Ohio	reversed
Hickey's Lessee v. Stewart	750 (1845)	McKinley	none	none	C.C.S.D. Miss.	reversed
Thomas Wilson and Company v. Smith	763 (1845)	Taney	none	none	C.C.D. Ill.	certification
Ross v. Prentiss	771 (1845)	Taney	none	none	C.C.D. Ga.	dismissed
Winston v. United States	771 (1845)	Taney	none	none	C.C.N.D. Miss.	dismissed
United States v. King	773 (1845)	Taney	none	none	C.C.E.D. La.	reversed

== See also ==
- Certificate of division
