= Supersedeas bond =

Type of surety bond

A supersedeas bond (often shortened to supersedeas), also known as a defendant's appeal bond, is a type of surety bond that a court requires from an appellant who wants to delay payment of a judgment until an appeal is over.

This is a feature of common law, and in particular the American legal system. In most European countries an appeal leads to an automatic stay of execution, unless the judge expressly ordered immediate execution.

== Definition ==
According to Black's Law Dictionary, a supersedeas bond (also known as an "appeal bond") is:

[A] bond required of one who petitions to set aside a judgment or execution and from which the other party may be made whole if the action is unsuccessful.

== Purpose and usage ==
After litigation and a civil court ruling, the losing party can appeal against the judgment. At this point, both the plaintiff and defendant could have similar concerns. An appeal takes time – in some cases many years. After the case is finally decided, whichever party wins will perhaps be more "out of pocket" from its costs. Also time will have passed, and the losing party may be bankrupt or have used the time to hide assets or otherwise frustrate efforts to collect on the judgment if they lose their appeal.

Therefore, it is often either a requirement of the law, or an order of the court, that prior to commencing its appeal processes, the losing party must provide a surety bond – money it pays to the court or a third party, to demonstrate its good faith and commitment to paying judgment if it loses, and in some cases to show that their appeal is not frivolous or merely a tactic to delay or avoid payment. This is known as a supersedeas (or "appeal") bond, and shows that they can and will cover the damages or fees awarded – including any additional costs of the appeal.

The bond may not be – and often is not – the exact value of the ruling. In some cases it is significantly larger since it is intended to cover interest or other costs which may arise on appeal.

A supersedeas bond is often paid in full – and may be handled via insurance or underwriting in some cases.

== Supersedeas bond rules in the United States ==
The amount and availability of a supersedeas bond depends on state regulations and case specifics.

In New Jersey, the posting of a bond is not required to appeal a decision. However, if the party wishes to stay a judgment during the appeal, a motion must be made with the Superior Court, and the court can require the posting of a bond or cash deposit under R.2:9-5 and R.2:9-6. The same rule applies in Delaware under the state constitution as well as the court rules.

Arizona Rules of Civil Appellate Procedure, Rule 7, provides that "except in cases involving custody of children", an appellant may obtain a stay on a lower court judgment and all other further proceedings by filing a supersedeas bond in the Superior Court.

In California, for instance, the supersedeas bond amount must be 150% of the judgment amount, whereas in Florida, the amount may include two years of statutory interest for those fees.

In Florida, the amount of a supersedeas bond is limited to no more than $50 million per appellant. State supreme court justice Carlson seems to be concerned with how the state has failed to differentiate between supersedeas and cost bonds. Which he stated "is problematic, because these terms are not synonymous. The bond required to perfect an appeal is a cost bond, which is sometimes referred to as an appeal bond. The bond required to obtain a stay of execution of a judgment while the judgment is being appealed is a supersedeas bond, also referred to as an appeal bond."

In Texas, the amount of a supersedeas bond (referred to as "security for judgments pending appeal" in the Texas Civil Practice and Remedies Code) is determined as follows:

- Under subsection (a), the amount of the bond must equal 1) the amount of compensatory damages awarded in the judgment, 2) interest for the estimated duration of the appeal, and 3) costs awarded in the judgment.
- Under subsection (b), notwithstanding the requirements of subsection (a), the security cannot exceed the lesser of 1) 50 percent of the judgment debtor's net worth or 2) USD$25 million.
- Under subsection (c), if the judgment debtor shows that the amount of the security would cause "substantial economic harm", the trial court is required to lower it to an amount that would not cause such harm.
- Subsection (d) allows an appellate court to review and modify the amount of security, but not to exceed the limitations above.
- Subsection (e) permits a trial court to enter orders preventing dissipation or transfer of assets to avoid satisfaction of the judgment, but not so as to prohibit use, transfer, conveyance, or dissipation of assets in the normal course of business.

== Bond advantages ==
Obtaining a supersedeas bond may appear to be judicial red tape; however, it serves the best interest of the defendant and plaintiff. The appellant uses a supersedeas bond to stay the execution of the judgment, meaning the appellant does not have to pay the full amount of the judgment until the appellate court makes a ruling and then only if the ruling is to affirm the judgment. A surety bond also replaces the need for collateral. The plaintiff, or party to whom the money judgment is awarded, is fully protected by the bond and ensured payment, that is if the appealing party can afford the bond.
