= List of United States Supreme Court military case law =

This is a list of Supreme Court of the United States cases in the areas of military justice, national security, and other aspects of war.

This list is a list solely of United States Supreme Court decisions about applying law related to war. Not all Supreme Court decisions are ultimately influential and, as in other fields, not all important decisions are made at the Supreme Court level. Many federal courts issue rulings that are significant or come to be influential, but those are outside the scope of this list.

== General ==
=== 19th century ===
- Wise v. Withers, 7 U.S. 331 (1806)
- Houston v. Moore, 16 U.S. 433 (1818)
- Martin v. Mott, 25 U.S. 19 (1827)
- Wilkes v. Dinsman, 48 U.S. 89 (1849)
- Dynes v. Hoover, 61 U.S. 65 (1857)
- Ex parte Vallandigham, 68 U.S. 243 (1864)
- Ex parte Milligan, 71 U.S. (4 Wall.) 2 (1866)
- Ex parte McCardle, 74 U.S. (7 Wall.) 506 (1869)
- Tarble's Case, 80 U.S. (13 Wall.) 397 (1872)
- Mechanics' and Traders' Bank v. Union Bank, 89 U.S. 276 (1875)
- United States v. Landers, 92 U.S. 77 (1876)
- United States v. Chilson, 94 U.S. 225 (1877)
- United States v. Clark, 96 U.S. 37 (1878)
- Mimmack v. United States, 97 U.S. 426 (1878)
- Coleman v. Tennessee, 97 U.S. 509 (1878)
- Ex parte Reed, 100 U.S. 13 (1879)
- McElrath v. United States, 102 U.S. 426 (1880)
- Blake v. United States, 103 U.S. 227 (1881)
- United States v. Tyler, 105 U.S. 244 (1882)
- Ex parte Mason, 105 U.S. 696 (1882)
- Keyes v. United States, 109 U.S. 336 (1883)
- Wales v. Whitney, 114 U.S. 564 (1885)
- United States v. Corson, 114 U.S. 619 (1885)
- Kurtz v. Moffitt, 115 U.S. 487 (1885)
- Smith v. Whitney, 116 U.S. 167 (1886)
- United States v. Perkins, 116 U.S. 483 (1886)
- Runkle v. United States, 122 U.S. 543 (1887)
- United States v. Hendee, 124 U.S. 309 (1888)
- Potts v. United States, 125 U.S. 173 (1888)
- Badeau v. United States, 130 U.S. 439 (1889)
- In re Grimley, 137 U.S. 147 (1890)
- United States v. Page, 137 U.S. 673 (1891)
- United States v. Kingsley, 138 U.S. 87 (1891)
- Mullan v. United States, 140 U.S. 240 (1891)
- United States v. Fletcher, 148 U.S. 84 (1893)
- Ide v. United States, 150 U.S. 517 (1893)
- Johnson v. Sayre, 158 U.S. 109 (1895)
- Swaim v. United States, 165 U.S. 553 (1897)

=== 20th century ===
- Quackenbush v. United States, 177 U.S. 20 (1900)
- Carter v. Roberts, 177 U.S. 496 (1900)
- Carter v. McClaughry, 183 U.S. 365 (1902)
- McClaughry v. Deming, 186 U.S. 49 (1902)
- The Manila Prize Cases, 188 U.S. 254 (1903)
- Hartigan v. United States, 196 U.S. 169 (1904)
- Bishop v. United States, 197 U.S. 334 (1905)
- United States v. Smith, 197 U.S. 386 (1905)
- United States v. Brown, 206 U.S. 240 (1907)
- Grafton v. United States, 206 U.S. 333 (1907)
- Carrington v. United States, 208 U.S. 1 (1908)
- Reid v. United States, 211 U.S. 529 (1909)
- Mullan v. United States, 212 U.S. 516 (1909)
- Franklin v. United States, 216 U.S. 559 (1910)
- Reaves v. Ainsworth, 219 U.S. 296 (1911)
- United States v. Vulte, 233 U.S. 509 (1914)
- United States v. Andrews, 240 U.S. 90 (1916)
- Caldwell v. Parker, 252 U.S. 376 (1920)
- Kahn v. Anderson, 255 U.S. 1 (1921)
- Givens v. Zerbst, 255 U.S. 11 (1921)
- Wallace v. United States, 257 U.S. 541 (1922)
- Collins v. McDonald, 258 U.S. 416 (1922)
- United States ex rel. French v. Weeks, 259 U.S. 326 (1922)
- Denby v. Berry, 263 U.S. 29 (1923)
- United States v. Gay, 264 U.S. 353 (1924)
- Ex parte Quirin, 317 U.S. 1 (1942)
- Hirabayashi v. United States, 320 U.S. 81 (1943)
- Korematsu v. United States, 323 U.S. 214 (1944)
- Ex parte Endo, 323 U.S. 283 (1944)
- Cramer v. United States, 325 U.S. 1 (1945)
- In re Yamashita, 327 U.S. 1 (1946)
- Duncan v. Kahanamoku, 327 U.S. 304 (1946)
- National Labor Relations Board v. E. C. Atkins & Co., 331 U.S. 398 (1947)
- Hirshberg v. Cooke, 336 U.S. 210 (1949)
- Wade v. Hunter, 336 U.S. 684 (1949)
- Humphrey v. Smith, 336 U.S. 695 (1949)
- Hirota v. MacArthur, 338 U.S. 197 (1949)
- Hiatt v. Brown, 339 U.S. 103 (1950)
- Johnson v. Eisentrager, 339 U.S. 763 (1950)
- Snyder v. Buck, 340 U.S. 15 (1950)
- Whelchel v. McDonald, 340 U.S. 122 (1950)
- Gusik v. Schilder, 340 U.S. 128 (1950)
- Madsen v. Kinsella, 343 U.S. 341 (1952)
- Youngstown Sheet & Tube Co. v. Sawyer, 343 U.S. 579 (1952)
- Kawakita v. United States, 343 U.S. 717 (1952)
- Burns v. Wilson, 346 U.S. 137 (1953)
- United States ex rel. Toth v. Quarles, 350 U.S. 11 (1955)
- Kinsella v. Krueger, 351 U.S. 470 (1956)
- Reid v. Covert, 351 U.S. 487 (1956)
- Cole v. Young, 351 U.S. 536 (1956)
- Jackson v. Taylor, 353 U.S. 569 (1957)
- Fowler v. Wilkinson, 353 U.S. 583 (1957)
- Reid v. Covert, 354 U.S. 1 (1957)
- Wilson v. Girard, 354 U.S. 524 (1957)
- Trop v. Dulles, 356 U.S. 86 (1958)
- Nishikawa v. Dulles, 356 U.S. 129 (1958)
- Lee v. Madigan, 358 U.S. 228 (1959)
- Greene v. McElroy, 360 U.S. 474 (1959)
- Taylor v. McElroy, 360 U.S. 709 (1959)
- United Steelworkers v. United States, 361 U.S. 39 (1959)
- Kinsella v. Singleton, 361 U.S. 234 (1960)
- Grisham v. Hagan, 361 U.S. 278 (1960)
- McElroy v. Guagliardo, 361 U.S. 281 (1960)
- Bell v. United States, 366 U.S. 393 (1961)
- Cafeteria & Restaurant Workers Union, Local 473 v. McElroy, 367 U.S. 886 (1961)
- Paul v. United States, 371 U.S. 245 (1963)
- Greene v. United States, 376 U.S. 149 (1964)
- Harrison v. McNamara, 380 U.S. 261 (1965)
- United States v. Robel, 389 U.S. 258 (1967)
- United States v. Augenblick, 393 U.S. 348 (1969)
- O'Callahan v. Parker, 395 U.S. 258 (1969)
- Noyd v. Bond, 395 U.S. 683 (1969)
- Relford v. Commandant, US Disciplinary Barracks, Fort Leavenworth, 401 U.S. 355 (1971)
- Schlanger v. Seamans, 401 U.S. 487 (1971)
- Ehlert v. United States, 402 U.S. 99 (1971)
- New York Times Co. v. United States, 403 U.S. 713 (1971)
- Parisi v. Davidson, 405 U.S. 34 (1972)
- Strait v. Laird, 406 U.S. 341 (1972)
- Laird v. Tatum, 408 U.S. 1 (1972)
- Gravel v. United States, 408 U.S. 606 (1972)
- Frontiero v. Richardson, 411 U.S. 677 (1973)
- Gosa v. Mayden, 413 U.S. 665 (1973)
- Parker v. Levy, 417 U.S. 733 (1974)
- Secretary of the Navy v. Avrech, 418 U.S. 676 (1974)
- Schick v. Reed, 419 U.S. 256 (1974)
- Schlesinger v. Ballard, 419 U.S. 498 (1975)
- Schlesinger v. Councilman, 420 U.S. 738 (1975)
- McLucas v. DeChamplain, 421 U.S. 21 (1975)
- Greer v. Spock, 424 U.S. 828 (1976)
- Middendorf v. Henry, 425 U.S. 25 (1976)
- United States v. Larionoff, 431 U.S. 864 (1977)
- United States v. MacDonald, 435 U.S. 850 (1978)
- Brown v. Glines, 444 U.S. 348 (1980)
- Secretary of the Navy v. Huff, 444 U.S. 453 (1980)
- Snepp v. United States, 444 U.S. 507 (1980)
- Haig v. Agee, 453 U.S. 280 (1981)
- Dames & Moore v. Regan, 453 U.S. 654 (1981)
- Weinberger v. Rossi, 456 U.S. 25 (1982)
- Weinberger v. Romero-Barcelo, 456 U.S. 305 (1982)
- Chappell v. Wallace, 462 U.S. 296 (1983)
- United States v. Albertini, 472 U.S. 675 (1985)
- Goldman v. Weinberger, 475 U.S. 503 (1986)
- Burke v. Barnes, 479 U.S. 361 (1987)
- Solorio v. United States, 483 U.S. 435 (1987)
- Department of the Navy v. Egan, 484 U.S. 518 (1988)
- Webster v. Doe, 486 U.S. 592 (1988)
- Carlucci v. Doe, 488 U.S. 93 (1988)
- Crandon v. United States, 494 U.S. 152 (1990)
- North Dakota v. United States, 495 U.S. 423 (1990)
- Conroy v. Aniskoff, 507 U.S. 511 (1993)
- Weiss v. United States, 510 U.S. 163 (1994)
- Dalton v. Specter, 511 U.S. 462 (1994)
- Davis v. United States, 512 U.S. 452 (1994)
- Ryder v. United States, 515 U.S. 177 (1995)
- Loving v. United States, 517 U.S. 748 (1996)
- Edmond v. United States, 520 U.S. 651 (1997)
- United States v. Scheffer, 523 U.S. 303 (1998)
- Clinton v. Goldsmith, 526 U.S. 529 (1999)

=== 21st century ===
- Rumsfeld v. Padilla, 542 U.S. 426 (2004)
- Rasul v. Bush, 542 U.S. 466 (2004)
- Hamdi v. Rumsfeld, 542 U.S. 507 (2004)
- Rumsfeld v. Forum for Academic and Institutional Rights, Inc., 547 U.S. 47 (2006)
- Hamdan v. Rumsfeld, 548 U.S. 557 (2006)
- Munaf v. Geren, 553 U.S. 674 (2008)
- Boumediene v. Bush, 553 U.S. 723 (2008)
- Winter v. Natural Resources Defense Council, 555 U.S. 7 (2008)
- al-Marri v. Spagone, 555 U.S. 1220 (2009)
- United States v. Denedo, 556 U.S. 904 (2009)
- Republic of Iraq v. Beaty, 556 U.S. 848 (2009)
- Kiyemba v. Obama, 559 U.S. 131 (2010)
- Snyder v. Phelps, 562 U.S. 443 (2011)
- United States v. Kebodeaux, 570 U.S. 387 (2013)
- Bank Markazi v. Peterson, No. 14-770, 578 U.S. ___ (2016)
- Ortiz v. United States, No. 16-1423, 585 U.S. ___ (2018)
- Cox v. United States, No. 16-1017, 585 U.S. ___ (2018)
- Dalmazzi v. United States, No. 16-961, 585 U.S. ___ (2018)
- Republic of Sudan v. Harrison, No. 16-1094, 587 U.S. ___ (2019)
- Opati v. Republic of Sudan, No. 17-1268, 590 U.S. ___ (2020)
- United States v. Briggs, No. 19-108, 592 U.S. ___ (2020)
- United States v. Washington, No. 21-404, 596 U.S. ___ (2022)

== Freedom of Information Act ==
- Department of Air Force v. Rose, 425 U.S. 352 (1976)
- Chrysler Corp. v. Brown, 441 U.S. 281 (1979)
- Weinberger v. Catholic Action of Haw./Peace Ed. Project, 454 U.S. 139 (1981)
- United States v. Weber Aircraft Corp., 465 U.S. 792 (1984)
- Central Intelligence Agency v. Sims, 471 U.S. 159 (1985)
- Milner v. Department of Navy, 562 U.S. 562 (2011)

== Liability ==
- Mitchell v. Harmony, 54 U.S. 115 (1851)
- United States v. Russell, 80 U.S. 623 (1871)
- Dow v. Johnson, 100 U.S. 158 (1879)
- United States v. Pacific Railroad, 120 U.S. 227 (1887)
- Feres v. United States, 340 U.S. 146 (1950)
- United States v. Caltex, Inc., 344 U.S. 149 (1952)
- Dalehite v. United States, 346 U.S. 15 (1953)
- Laird v. Nelms, 406 U.S. 797 (1972)
- Nixon v. Fitzgerald, 457 U.S. 731 (1982)
- Harlow v. Fitzgerald, 457 U.S. 800 (1982)
- United States v. Stanley, 483 U.S. 669 (1987)
- Boyle v. United Technologies Corp., 487 U.S. 500 (1988)
- United States v. Smith, 499 U.S. 160 (1991)
- Christopher v. Harbury, 536 U.S. 403 (2002)
- Campbell-Ewald Co. v. Gomez, No. 14-857, 577 U.S. ___ (2016)
- Air & Liquid Systems Corp. v. DeVries, No. 17-1104, 586 U.S. ___ (2019)

== Reservists ==
- Gilligan v. Morgan, 413 U.S. 1 (1973)
- Monroe v. Standard Oil Co., 452 U.S. 549 (1981)
- Perpich v. Department of Defense, 496 U.S. 334 (1990)
- Staub v. Proctor Hospital, 562 U.S. 411 (2011)
- Babcock v. Kijakazi, No. 20-480, 595 U.S. ___ (2022)
- Torres v. Texas Department of Public Safety, No. 20-603, 597 U.S. ___ (2022)
- Ohio Adjutant General's Department v. Federal Labor Relations Authority, No. 21-1454, 598 U.S. ___ (2023)
- Feliciano v. Department of Transportation, No. 23-861, 604 U.S. ___ (2025)

== Selective Service and draft ==
- Selective Draft Law Cases, 245 U.S. 366 (1918)
- Cox v. Wood, 247 U.S. 3 (1918)
- Bowles v. United States, 319 U.S. 33 (1943)
- Bartchy v. United States, 319 U.S. 484 (1943)
- Falbo v. United States, 320 U.S. 549 (1944)
- Billings v. Truesdell, 321 U.S. 542 (1944)
- Singer v. United States, 323 U.S. 338 (1945)
- Keegan v. United States, 325 U.S. 478 (1945)
- Estep v. United States, 327 U.S. 114 (1946)
- United States v. Anderson, 328 U.S. 699 (1946)
- Eagles v. United States ex rel. Samuels, 329 U.S. 304 (1946)
- Eagles v. United States ex rel. Horowitz, 329 U.S. 317 (1946)
- Gibson v. United States, 329 U.S. 338 (1946)
- Patterson v. Lamb, 329 U.S. 539 (1947)
- Harris v. United States, 331 U.S. 145 (1947)
- Sunal v. Large, 332 U.S. 174 (1947)
- Cox v. United States, 332 U.S. 442 (1947)
- Mogall v. United States, 333 U.S. 424 (1948)
- McGrath v. Kristensen, 340 U.S. 162 (1950)
- Moser v. United States, 341 U.S. 41 (1951)
- Orloff v. Willoughby, 345 U.S. 83 (1953)
- United States v. Nugent, 346 U.S. 1 (1953)
- Dickinson v. United States, 346 U.S. 389 (1953)
- Witmer v. United States, 348 U.S. 375 (1955)
- Sicurella v. United States, 348 U.S. 385 (1955)
- Simmons v. United States, 348 U.S. 397 (1955)
- Gonzales v. United States, 348 U.S. 407 (1955)
- Johnston v. United States, 351 U.S. 215 (1956)
- Ceballos v. Shaughnessy, 352 U.S. 599 (1957)
- Mackey v. Mendoza-Martinez, 362 U.S. 384 (1960)
- Gonzales v. United States, 364 U.S. 59 (1960)
- Rusk v. Cort, 369 U.S. 367 (1962)
- Kennedy v. Mendoza-Martinez, 372 U.S. 144 (1963)
- United States v. Seeger, 380 U.S. 163 (1965)
- United States v. O'Brien, 391 U.S. 367 (1968)
- Oestereich v. Selective Service System Local Board No. 11, 393 U.S. 233 (1968)
- Clark v. Gabriel, 393 U.S. 256 (1968)
- McKart v. United States, 395 U.S. 185 (1969)
- Gutknecht v. United States, 396 U.S. 295 (1970)
- Breen v. Selective Service Local Board No. 16, 396 U.S. 460 (1970)
- Kolden v. Selective Serv. Local Bd. No. 4, 397 U.S. 47 (1970)
- Toussie v. United States, 397 U.S. 112 (1970)
- Bratcher v. Laird, 397 U.S. 246 (1970)
- Welsh v. United States, 398 U.S. 333 (1970)
- Mulloy v. United States, 398 U.S. 410 (1970)
- United States v. Sisson, 399 U.S. 267 (1970)
- United States v. Weller, 401 U.S. 254 (1971)
- Gillette v. United States, 401 U.S. 437 (1971)
- McGee v. United States, 402 U.S. 479 (1971)
- Astrup v. INS, 402 U.S. 509 (1971)
- Cohen v. California, 403 U.S. 15 (1971)
- Clay v. United States, 403 U.S. 698 (1971)
- Fein v. Selective Serv. System Local Bd. No. 7 of Yonkers, 405 U.S. 365 (1972)
- Rosengart v. Laird, 405 U.S. 908 (1972)
- Musser v. United States, 414 U.S. 31 (1974)
- Johnson v. Robison, 415 U.S. 361 (1974)
- Hernandez v. Veterans' Administration, 415 U.S. 391 (1974)
- Davis v. United States, 417 U.S. 333 (1974)
- United States v. Jenkins, 420 U.S. 358 (1975)
- Serfass v. United States, 420 U.S. 377 (1975)
- Rostker v. Goldberg, 453 U.S. 57 (1981)
- Selective Service System v. Minnesota Public Interest Research Group, 468 U.S. 841 (1984)
- Wayte v. United States, 470 U.S. 598 (1985)
- Elgin v. Department of Treasury, 567 U.S. 1 (2012)

== State secrets privilege ==
- Totten v. United States, 92 U.S. 105 (1876)
- United States v. Reynolds, 345 U.S. 1 (1953)
- Tenet v. Doe, 544 U.S. 1 (2005)
- General Dynamics Corp. v. United States, 563 U.S. 478 (2011)
- United States v. Zubaydah, No. 20-827, 595 U.S. ___ (2022)
- Federal Bureau of Investigation v. Fazaga, No. 20-828, 595 U.S. ___ (2022)

== Veterans ==
- Berry v. United States, 312 U.S. 450 (1941)
- Galloway v. United States, 319 U.S. 372 (1943)
- Fishgold v. Sullivan Drydock & Repair Corp., 328 U.S. 275 (1946)
- Trailmobile Co. v. Whirls, 331 U.S. 40 (1947)
- Mitchell v. Cohen, 333 U.S. 411 (1948)
- Aeronautical Industrial District Lodge 727 v. Campbell, 337 U.S. 521 (1949)
- Harmon v. Brucker, 355 U.S. 579 (1958)
- Tilton v. Missouri Pacific Railroad, 376 U.S. 169 (1964)
- Foster v. Dravo Corp., 420 U.S. 92 (1975)
- Alabama Power Co. v. Davis, 431 U.S. 581 (1977)
- Personnel Administrator of Massachusetts v. Feeney, 442 U.S. 256 (1979)
- Coffy v. Republic Steel Corp., 447 U.S. 191 (1980)
- McCarty v. McCarty, 453 U.S. 210 (1981)
- Mansell v. Mansell, 490 U.S. 581 (1989)
- Barker v. Kansas, 503 U.S. 594 (1992)
- Shinseki v. Sanders, 556 U.S. 396 (2009)
- Porter v. McCollum, 558 U.S. 30 (2009)
- Henderson v. Shinseki, 562 U.S. 428 (2011)
- Kingdomware Techs., Inc. v. United States, No. 14-916, 579 U.S. ___ (2016)
- Howell v. Howell, No. 15-1031, 581 U.S. ___ (2017)
- Kisor v. Wilkie, No. 18-15, 588 U.S. ___ (2019)
- George v. McDonough, No. 21-234, 596 U.S. ___ (2022)
- Arellano v. McDonough, 598 U.S. 1 (2023)
- Rudisill v. McDonough, No. 22-888, 601 U.S. ___ (2024)
- Bufkin v. McDonough, No. 23-713, 604 U.S. ___ (2025)
