= List of United States Supreme Court cases, volume 131 =

Supreme Court of the United States
- Interactive map of Supreme Court of the United States
- 38°53′26″N 77°00′16″W
- Established: March 4, 1789; 236 years ago
- Location: Washington, D.C.
- Coordinates: 38°53′26″N 77°00′16″W
- Composition method: Presidential nomination with Senate confirmation
- Authorised by: Constitution of the United States, Art. III, § 1
- Judge term length: life tenure, subject to impeachment and removal
- Number of positions: 9 (by statute)
- Website: supremecourt.gov

This is a list of cases reported in volume 131 of United States Reports, decided by the Supreme Court of the United States in 1888 and 1889.

== Justices of the Supreme Court at the time of volume 131 U.S. ==
The Supreme Court is established by Article III, Section 1 of the Constitution of the United States, which says: "The judicial Power of the United States, shall be vested in one supreme Court . . .". The size of the Court is not specified; the Constitution leaves it to Congress to set the number of justices. Under the Judiciary Act of 1789 Congress originally fixed the number of justices at six (one chief justice and five associate justices). Since 1789 Congress has varied the size of the Court from six to seven, nine, ten, and back to nine justices (always including one chief justice).

When the cases in volume 131 U.S. were decided the Court comprised the following nine members:

Portrait	Justice	Office	Home State	Succeeded	Date confirmed by the Senate (Vote)	Tenure on Supreme Court
	Melville Fuller	Chief Justice	Illinois	Morrison Waite	July 20, 1888 (41–20)	October 8, 1888 – July 4, 1910 (Died)
	Samuel Freeman Miller	Associate Justice	Iowa	Peter Vivian Daniel	July 16, 1862 (Acclamation)	July 21, 1862 – October 13, 1890 (Died)
	Stephen Johnson Field	Associate Justice	California	newly created seat	March 10, 1863 (Acclamation)	May 10, 1863 – December 1, 1897 (Retired)
	Joseph P. Bradley	Associate Justice	New Jersey	newly created seat	March 21, 1870 (46–9)	March 23, 1870 – January 22, 1892 (Died)
	John Marshall Harlan	Associate Justice	Kentucky	David Davis	November 29, 1877 (Acclamation)	December 10, 1877 – October 14, 1911 (Died)
	Stanley Matthews	Associate Justice	Ohio	Noah Haynes Swayne	May 12, 1881 (24–23)	May 17, 1881 – March 22, 1889 (Died)
	Horace Gray	Associate Justice	Massachusetts	Nathan Clifford	December 20, 1881 (51–5)	January 9, 1882 – September 15, 1902 (Died)
	Samuel Blatchford	Associate Justice	New York	Ward Hunt	March 22, 1882 (Acclamation)	April 3, 1882 – July 7, 1893 (Died)
	Lucius Quintus Cincinnatus Lamar	Associate Justice	Mississippi	William Burnham Woods	January 16, 1888 (32–28)	January 18, 1888 – January 23, 1893 (Died)

== Citation style ==
Under the Judiciary Act of 1789 the federal court structure at the time comprised District Courts, which had general trial jurisdiction; Circuit Courts, which had mixed trial and appellate (from the US District Courts) jurisdiction; and the United States Supreme Court, which had appellate jurisdiction over the federal District and Circuit courts—and for certain issues over state courts. The Supreme Court also had limited original jurisdiction (i.e., in which cases could be filed directly with the Supreme Court without first having been heard by a lower federal or state court). There were one or more federal District Courts and/or Circuit Courts in each state, territory, or other geographical region.

Bluebook citation style is used for case names, citations, and jurisdictions.

- "C.C.D." = United States Circuit Court for the District of . . .
  - e.g.,"C.C.D.N.J." = United States Circuit Court for the District of New Jersey
- "D." = United States District Court for the District of . . .
  - e.g.,"D. Mass." = United States District Court for the District of Massachusetts
- "E." = Eastern; "M." = Middle; "N." = Northern; "S." = Southern; "W." = Western
  - e.g.,"C.C.S.D.N.Y." = United States Circuit Court for the Southern District of New York
  - e.g.,"M.D. Ala." = United States District Court for the Middle District of Alabama
- "Ct. Cl." = United States Court of Claims
- The abbreviation of a state's name alone indicates the highest appellate court in that state's judiciary at the time.
  - e.g.,"Pa." = Supreme Court of Pennsylvania
  - e.g.,"Me." = Supreme Judicial Court of Maine

== List of cases in volume 131 U.S. ==
Case Name	Page & year	Opinion of the Court	Concurring opinion(s)	Dissenting opinion(s)	Lower Court	Disposition
United States v. Jones	1 (1889)	Bradley	none	Miller	C.C.D. Or.	reversed
United States v. Drew	21 (1889)	Bradley	none	none	C.C.W.D. La.	reversed
Kennon v. Gilmer	22 (1889)	Gray	none	none	Sup. Ct. Terr. Mont.	reversed
Allman v. United States	31 (1889)	Lamar	none	none	Ct. Cl.	reversed
United States v. Davis	36 (1889)	Fuller	none	none	D. Md.	dismissal denied
Terry v. Sharon	40 (1889)	Miller	none	none	C.C.N.D. Cal.	affirmed
United States v. Hall	50 (1889)	Miller	none	none	C.C.D. Cal.	certification
United States v. Perrin	55 (1889)	Miller	none	none	C.C.D. Cal.	certification
United States v. Reilly	58 (1889)	Miller	none	none	C.C.D. Cal.	certification
Palmer v. Arthur	60 (1889)	Fuller	none	none	C.C.D. Ky.	affirmed
Spalding v. Manasse	65 (1889)	Fuller	none	none	C.C.N.D. Ill.	affirmed
Abendroth v. Van Dolsen & Arnott	66 (1889)	Lamar	none	none	New York City Ct.	affirmed
Douglass v. Lewis	75 (1889)	Fuller	none	none	Sup. Ct. Terr. N.M.	affirmed
Fowle v. Park	88 (1889)	Fuller	none	none	C.C.S.D. Ohio	reversed
United States M.A. Ass'n v. Barry	100 (1889)	Blatchford	none	none	C.C.E.D. Wis.	affirmed
Thompson v. Hubbard	123 (1889)	Blatchford	none	none	C.C.E.D. Mo.	reversed
Stewart v. Masterson	151 (1889)	Blatchford	none	none	C.C.W.D. Tex.	reversed
Cornely v. Marckwald	159 (1889)	Blatchford	none	none	C.C.S.D.N.Y.	affirmed
Coler v. City of Cleburne	162 (1889)	Blatchford	none	none	C.C.N.D. Tex.	affirmed
Ex Parte Nielsen	176 (1889)	Bradley	none	none	D. Terr. Utah	reversed
City of New Orleans v. Gaines's Adm'r	191 (1889)	Bradley	none	none	C.C.E.D. La.	reversed
City of New Orleans v. Christmas	220 (1889)	Bradley	none	none	C.C.E.D. La.	reversed
Ex Parte Parker	221 (1889)	Field	none	none	Wash.	mandamus issued
Stickney v. Stickney	227 (1889)	Field	none	none	Sup. Ct. D.C.	affirmed
Crehore v. Ohio & M. Ry. Co.	240 (1889)	Harlan	none	none	C.C.D. Ky.	modification denied
Morgan v. Struthers	246 (1889)	Lamar	none	none	C.C.W.D. Pa.	reversed
Bacon v. Northwestern M.L. Ins. Co.	258 (1889)	Lamar	none	none	C.C.W.D. Mich.	affirmed
In re Savin	267 (1889)	Harlan	none	none	C.C.S.D. Cal.	affirmed
In re Cuddy	280 (1889)	Harlan	none	none	C.C.S.D. Cal.	affirmed
Segrist v. Crabtree	287 (1889)	Harlan	none	none	Sup. Ct. Terr. N.M.	affirmed
Veach v. Rice	293 (1889)	Fuller	none	none	C.C.N.D. Ga.	reversed
Hawkins v. Glenn	319 (1889)	Fuller	none	none	C.C.E.D.N.C.	affirmed
Embrey v. Jemison	336 (1889)	Harlan	none	none	C.C.E.D. Va.	reversed
Mellen v. Moline M.I. Works	352 (1889)	Harlan	none	none	C.C.N.D. Ill.	affirmed
Pittsburgh et al. Ry. Co. v. Keokuk & H.B. Co.	371 (1889)	Gray	none	none	C.C.N.D. Ill.	affirmed
Williams v. Conger	390 (1888)	Bradley	none	none	C.C.N.D. Tex.	rehearing denied
Marshall v. United States	391 (1888)	Fuller	none	Harlan	Ct. Cl.	affirmed
Radford v. Folsom	392 (1888)	per curiam	none	none	C.C.S.D. Iowa	dismissed
Pacific E. Co. v. Malin	394 (1888)	per curiam	none	none	C.C.W.D. Tex.	dismissed
Chicago et al. Ry. Co. v. Gray	396 (1889)	per curiam	none	none	C.C.S.D. Iowa	dismissed
List v. Pennsylvania	396 (1888)	per curiam	none	none	Pa.	dismissed
Dent v. Ferguson	397 (1889)	per curiam	none	none	C.C.W.D. Tenn.	costs remitted
Hunt v. Blackburn	403 (1889)	per curiam	none	none	C.C.E.D. Ark.	decree absolute
Freeland v. Williams	405 (1889)	Miller	none	Harlan	W. Va.	affirmed
Menken v. City of Atlanta	405 (1889)	per curiam	none	none	Ga.	dismissed
