= Simmons v. United States =

- Supreme Court of the United States

Argued February 2, 1955 Decided March 14, 1955
- Full case name: Simmons v. United States
- Citations: 348 U.S. 397 (more) 75 S. Ct. 397; 99 L. Ed. 453; 1955 U.S. LEXIS 1080

Case history
- Prior: United States v. Simmons, 213 F.2d 901 (7th Cir. 1954); cert. granted, 348 U.S. 812 (1954).

Holding
- The failure of the Department of Justice to furnish petitioner Simmons with a fair resume of all adverse information in the FBI report deprived him of the "hearing" provided by the Universal Military Training and Service Act. Conviction, and Seventh Circuit, reversed.

Court membership
- Chief Justice Earl Warren Associate Justices Hugo Black · Stanley F. Reed; Felix Frankfurter · William O. Douglas; Harold H. Burton · Tom C. Clark; Sherman Minton

Case opinions
- Majority: Clark, joined by Black and Douglas
- Dissent: Reed
- Dissent: Minton

Laws applied
- Universal Military Training and Service Act

Simmons v. United States, 348 U.S. 397 (1955), was a case in which the Supreme Court of the United States ruled that a Jehovah's Witness was denied fair hearing because of failure to supply him with materials in his record.

== Background ==
Petitioner Simmons registered in the Selective Service System in 1948 and was employed as a chauffeur at the Great Lakes Naval Training Center. He was classified 1-A. Simmons married in 1949 and received a dependency deferment which lasted from 1951 through 1955, at which point he was again classified 1-A. During his deferment, Simmons became an ordained minister of the Jehovah's Witnesses and filed the special form for conscientious objectors, claiming exception from both combatant and non-combatant service. He appeared in person before his local board seeking exemption as a minister, but the board maintained his 1-A classification and, after an unsuccessful appeal, referred the case to the Department of Justice.

Following an investigation by the FBI, Simmons appeared at another hearing. While no notice for the hearing existed, similar forms used at the time state that the hearing officer would advise the registrant "as to the general nature and character" of adverse evidence in the FBI report if that information was requested. Evidence for this request was never found from before the hearing, but the request was made at the hearing. The hearing officer recommended that Simmons remain classified 1-A because his religious activities coincided with pressure from the draft board.

In appealing to an Appeal Board, the Department of Justice adopted the recommendation of the hearing officer because of the timing of Simmons' religious activities and alleged abuse toward his wife (evidence for which was presumably gathered by the FBI). The Appeal Board continued the 1-A classification, but Simmons refused to submit to induction and prosecution followed. Simmons claimed he had not been given a fair summary of the FBI report and secured a subpoena duces tecum requiring production of the report. The subpoena was quashed on motion of the government, Simmons was convicted, and the Seventh Circuit affirmed.

== Opinion ==
Justice Clark delivered the opinion of the Court.

Section 6(j) of the Universal Military Training and Service Act provides that the Department of Justice must hold a hearing "with respect to the character and good faith" of any claimed conscientious objections. In a prior case (United States v. Nugent, 346 U.S. 1 (1953)), relying on the availability of a summary of reports, the Court held that the Department satisfies its duties "when it accords a fair opportunity to the registrant to speak his piece before an impartial hearing officer; when it permits him to produce all relevant evidence in his own behalf and at the same time supplies him with a fair resume of any adverse evidence in the investigator's report." This is viewed as an essential element in the processing of conscientious objector claims, not a matter of grace within the Department's discretion.

== Dissents ==
Though no formal dissent can be found, it is noted at the end of the opinion that Justice Reed would affirm the judgement of the Seventh Circuit on the grounds that no such summary was requested (by the petitioner) and, because of that, it was not necessary to furnish more to the registrant than was given by the hearing officer.

Justice Minton also dissented, arguing that even if a fair resume from the FBI was denied, it was not done arbitrarily and that the judgement of the board in doing so was, though erroneous, certainly allowable.

== See also ==
- List of United States Supreme Court cases, volume 348
- List of Supreme Court cases involving Jehovah's Witnesses
