= Louisiana ex rel. Francis v. Resweber =

Francis v. Resweber
- Supreme Court of the United States

Argued November 18, 1946 Decided January 13, 1947
- Full case name: State of Louisiana ex rel. Francis v. Resweber, Sheriff, et al.
- Citations: 329 U.S. 459 (more) 67 S. Ct. 374; 91 L. Ed. 422

Case history
- Prior: None
- Subsequent: None

Holding
- Attempting a second electrocution after the first fails does not violate the 8th Amendment prohibition against cruel and unusual punishment, nor does it constitute a second imposition of punishment in violation of the 5th Amendment.

Court membership
- Chief Justice Fred M. Vinson Associate Justices Hugo Black · Stanley F. Reed; Felix Frankfurter · William O. Douglas; Frank Murphy · Robert H. Jackson; Wiley B. Rutledge · Harold H. Burton

Case opinions
- Plurality: Reed, joined by Vinson, Black, Jackson
- Concurrence: Frankfurter
- Dissent: Burton, joined by Douglas, Murphy, Rutledge

Laws applied
- U.S. Const. amends. V, VIII, XIV

Louisiana ex rel. Francis v. Resweber, 329 U.S. 459 (1947), is a case in which the U.S. Supreme Court was asked whether imposing capital punishment (the electric chair) a second time, after it failed in an attempt to execute Willie Francis in 1946, constituted a violation of the United States Constitution. The issues raised surrounded the double jeopardy clause of the Fifth Amendment, and the cruel and unusual punishment clause of the Eighth Amendment, as made applicable to the State of Louisiana via the due process clause of the Fourteenth Amendment.

In an opinion by Justice Stanley Forman Reed, which three other justices (Chief Justice Vinson and Associate Justices Hugo Black and Robert H. Jackson) joined, and with which Justice Felix Frankfurter concurred, the Court held that re-executing Francis did not constitute double jeopardy or cruel and unusual punishment. Justice Reed wrote,

Our minds rebel against permitting the same sovereignty to punish an accused twice for the same offense. But where the accused successfully seeks review of a conviction, there is no double jeopardy upon a new trial. Even where a state obtains a new trial after conviction because of errors, while an accused may be placed on trial a second time, it is not the sort of hardship to the accused that is forbidden by the Fourteenth Amendment ... For we see no difference from a constitutional point of view between a new trial for error of law at the instance of the state that results in a death sentence instead of imprisonment for life and an execution that follows a failure of equipment. When an accident, with no suggestion of malevolence, prevents the consummation of a sentence, the state's subsequent course in the administration of its criminal law is not affected on that account by any requirement of due process under the Fourteenth Amendment. We find no double jeopardy here which can be said to amount to a denial of federal due process in the proposed execution. (Citations omitted).

Dissenting, however, Justice Harold Burton (joined by Justices William O. Douglas, Frank Murphy, and Wiley Rutledge) argued,

How many deliberate and intentional reapplications of electric current does it take to produce a cruel, unusual and unconstitutional punishment? While five applications would be more cruel and unusual than one, the uniqueness of the present case demonstrates that, today, two separated applications are sufficiently 'cruel and unusual' to be prohibited. If five attempts would be 'cruel and unusual,' it would be difficult to draw the line between two, three, four and five. It is not difficult, however, as we here contend, to draw the line between the one continuous application prescribed by statute and any other application of the current. Lack of intent that the first application be less than fatal is not material. The intent of the executioner cannot lessen the torture or excuse the result.

Francis was successfully executed the following year.

== See also ==
- List of United States Supreme Court cases, volume 329
