= Gonzales v. United States =

- Supreme Court of the United States

Argued February 1–2, 1955 Decided March 14, 1955
- Full case name: Gonzales v. United States
- Citations: 348 U.S. 407 (more) 75 S. Ct. 409; 99 L. Ed. 467; 1955 U.S. LEXIS 1081

Case history
- Prior: United States v. Gonzales, 120 F. Supp. 730 (E.D. Mich. 1953); affirmed, 212 F.2d 71 (6th Cir. 1954); cert. granted, 348 U.S. 811 (1954).

Holding
- A Jehovah's Witness was denied fair hearing because of failure to supply him with materials in his record.

Court membership
- Chief Justice Earl Warren Associate Justices Hugo Black · Stanley F. Reed; Felix Frankfurter · William O. Douglas; Harold H. Burton · Tom C. Clark; Sherman Minton

Case opinions
- Majority: Clark, joined by Warren, Black, Frankfurter, Douglas, and Harlan
- Dissent: Reed, joined by Burton
- Dissent: Minton

Laws applied
- Universal Military Training and Service Act

Gonzales v. United States, 348 U.S. 407 (1955), was a case in which the Supreme Court of the United States held that a Jehovah's Witness was denied fair hearing because of failure to supply him with materials in his record.

== Facts of the case ==
Gonzales, a member of Jehovah's Witnesses who had claimed and had been denied conscientious objector exemption, was convicted under the Universal Military Training and Service Act for refusal to submit to induction into the armed forces.

== Decision of the court ==
The 6-3 opinion of the court was written by Justice Clark, holding that the petitioner was entitled to receive a copy of the recommendation made by the Department of Justice to the Appeal Board under the provisions of 6 (j) of the Universal Military Training and Service Act. Justice Reed, joined by Justice Burton, and Justice Minton each filed a dissenting opinion.

== See also ==
- List of United States Supreme Court cases, volume 348
- List of Supreme Court cases involving Jehovah's Witnesses
