= Sicurella v. United States =

- Supreme Court of the United States

Argued February 1, 1955 Decided March 14, 1955
- Full case name: Sicurella v. United States
- Citations: 348 U.S. 385 (more) 75 S. Ct. 403; 99 L. Ed. 436; 1955 U.S. LEXIS 1079

Court membership
- Chief Justice Earl Warren Associate Justices Hugo Black · Stanley F. Reed; Felix Frankfurter · William O. Douglas; Harold H. Burton · Tom C. Clark; Sherman Minton

Case opinions
- Majority: Clark, joined by Warren, Black, Frankfurter, Douglas, Burton
- Dissent: Reed
- Dissent: Minton

Sicurella v. United States, 348 U.S. 385 (1955), was a case in which the Supreme Court of the United States held that willingness to fight in "theocratic" wars does not disqualify a Jehovah's Witness who would otherwise be eligible for exemption as a conscientious objector.

== Background ==
Sicurella, a member of Jehovah's Witnesses, filed a petition for conscientious objector status in regards to the Selective Service of the United States Armed Forces in 1950. Sicurella had previously been classified as a minister, but was reclassified for general service in 1950, leading to his petition. His request was subsequently denied by the Department of Justice on the grounds that he did not meet the legal requirement for a conscious objector to object to participation in war in any form. Sicurella had indicated on his petition that he was willing to fight in a hypothetical theocratic war if commanded to by Jehovah and Jesus Christ. The Department of Justice acknowledged his claim was sincere, but determined that because he was willing to fight in defense of his ministry and Kingdom interests that he wasn't opposed to war in all forms. After they denied him Sicurella filed an appeal and the case made its way to the Supreme Court of the United States on the urging of T. Oscar Smith, the head of the Conscientious Objector Section at the Department of Justice, who had refused to grant the status to Jehovah's Witnesses who agreed with their religion's doctrine about war.

== Decision ==
Justice Tom C. Clark wrote the opinion of the court, which was decided by a 6–2 vote on March 14, 1955. The court sided with Sicurella and determined that the Department of Justice could not assume that Congress had intended to include hypothetical theocratic wars in its requirements for conscientious objector status. In the court opinion, Justice Clark wrote that Congress clearly intended for the requirement to only reflect "real shooting wars". He further points out that Sicurella made it clear that the weapons of his potential war would be spiritual, not carnal, and that Congress could not possibly be assumed to have included the climactic battles of Armageddon from various religious philosophies in their creation of the law. Therefore, the denial of his claim was subsequently overturned by the court and he was granted conscientious objector status.

Two dissenting opinions were written, one by Justice Stanley F. Reed and one by Justice Sherman Minton.

Reed stated in his dissenting opinion that he would require Sicurella to serve because his willingness to use force in defense of "Kingdom interests" is inconsistent with his claimed opposition to war.

Minton stated in his dissenting opinion that the court only had the power to decide issues of local board decisions if they are "so wanton, arbitrary and capricious as to destroy the integrity of the Board." Minton states that by the court's own opinion the decision by the board and the Department of Justice was made in good faith and therefore the Supreme Court should not have jurisdiction over this issue. Minton also states that he disagrees with the assertion that a religious war is not relevant to the conscientious objector issue, saying that it is still choosing some wars to participate in over others. Minton also points out Sicurella's willingness to use carnal weapons in defense of Kingdom interests as evidence that the two types of war can not be rightly separated in this case.

== Impacts ==
The decision is still in effect and actively mentioned as an example of a conscientious objector issue by the United States Selective Service to this day. The case has also been brought up by leaders in other faiths, such as the Mormon faith, in discussions about the issue of conscientious objector status in their faiths. The case also played a role in the decision of the Supreme Court case Gillette v. United States, which covers similar issues around religion and what classifies as a conscientious objector.

== See also ==
- List of United States Supreme Court cases, volume 348
- List of Supreme Court cases involving Jehovah's Witnesses
