= Thompson v. Hubbard =

- Supreme Court of the United States

Submitted April 17, 1889 Decided May 13, 1889
- Full case name: Thompson v. Hubbard
- Citations: 131 U.S. 123 (more) 9 S. Ct. 710; 33 L. Ed. 76

Holding
- A later owner of a copyright is entitled to sue a previous owner for copyright infringement. However, the later owner's failure to observe formalities voids copyright and a nonexistent copyright cannot be infringed.

Court membership
- Chief Justice Melville Fuller Associate Justices Samuel F. Miller · Stephen J. Field; Joseph P. Bradley · John M. Harlan; Horace Gray · Samuel Blatchford; Lucius Q. C. Lamar II

Case opinion
- Majority: Blatchford, joined by unanimous

Thompson v. Hubbard, 131 U.S. 123 (1889), was a United States Supreme Court case in which the Court held that a later owner of a copyright is entitled to sue a previous owner for copyright infringement. However, the later owner's failure to observe formalities voids copyright and a nonexistent copyright cannot be infringed.
