= Wilburn Boat Co. v. Fireman's Fund Insurance Co. =

Wilburn Boat Company v. Fireman's Fund Insurance Company
- Supreme Court of the United States

Argued October 14–15, 1954 Decided February 28, 1955
- Full case name: Wilburn Boat Company, et al. v. Fireman's Fund Insurance Company
- Citations: 348 U.S. 310 (more) 75 S. Ct. 368; 99 L. Ed. 337; 1955 U.S. LEXIS 1392

Case history
- Prior: 201 F.2d 833 (5th Cir. 1953); cert. granted, 347 U.S. 950 (1954).
- Subsequent: 259 F.2d 662 (5th Cir. 1958); on remand, 199 F. Supp. 784 (E.D. Tex. 1960)

Holding
- State law, rather than federal admiralty law, should govern marine insurance contracts.

Court membership
- Chief Justice Earl Warren Associate Justices Hugo Black · Stanley F. Reed; Felix Frankfurter · William O. Douglas; Harold H. Burton · Tom C. Clark; Sherman Minton

Case opinions
- Majority: Black, joined by Warren, Douglas, Clark, Minton, Harlan
- Concurrence: Frankfurter
- Dissent: Reed, joined by Burton

Wilburn Boat Company v. Fireman's Fund Insurance Company, 348 U.S. 310 (1955), is a United States Supreme Court case in which the court held that state law, rather than federal admiralty law, should govern marine insurance contracts.

== Background ==
Appellants J.F. Wilburn, J. H. Wilburn, L. G. Wilburn, and the Wilburn Boat Company, an Oklahoma based corporation, obtained a marine insurance policy from the Fireman's Fund Insurance Company for liability coverage for fire among other things, of a vessel called the Wanderer. The Wanderer was moored in an artificial lake called Lake Texoma which bordered the states of Texas and Oklahoma. While moored in Lake Texoma the vessel was completely destroyed by a fire. The Wilburn Boat Company sought recovery for their loss, but Fireman's Fund denied liability based on the Wilburn Boat Company's failure to strictly comply with terms of the contract.

Terms of the contract provided under warranties, that without written consent of the insurer the vessel could not be transferred, assigned, hired, or chartered and must be used solely for pleasure purposes. The Wilburn Boat Company had been operating the Wanderer as a commercial carrier, and the vessel had been sold and transferred by the Wilburn's in their personal capacity to the Wilburn Boat Co. Furthermore, the vessel had been pledged as collateral on two occasions; once to Citizen's National Bank and then to J.F. and J.H. Wilburn, jointly.

The Wilburn Boat Company brought suit in state court admitting to breaching the terms of the contract, but alleging that Texas law governed the terms of the marine insurance contract and as such Fireman's Fund is still liable. (Texas state statute provides that only in the event that the breach is the cause for the subsequent loss may the insured be barred from recovery.) The case was removed to federal court under diversity jurisdiction where Fireman's Fund argued that federal admiralty law governed and as such federal admiralty law requires strict compliance with terms of a marine insurance contract in order to recover on losses.

The Federal District Court found that the Wilburn Boat Company was unable to recover for their loss due to their failure to comply with the specific terms of the contract. The Wilburn Boat Company appealed to the U.S. Fifth District Court of Appeals, which affirmed the lower court decision. The Wilburn Boat Company was then granted certiorari.

== Opinion of the Court ==
In an opinion by Justice Black, the court explored two questions; (1) Is there a federal admiralty jurisdiction rule governing compliance with warranties in a marine contract and (2) If not, should the court fashion one?

The Supreme Court reversed and remanded, establishing that there was no federal admiralty law rule governing warranties in a marine insurance contract. Rather than formulating a uniform admiralty law rule, the Court cited to Paul v. Virginia and other cases following it to conclude that marine insurance contracts, like all other insurance contracts, are subject to state law.

=== Dissent ===
In his dissent, Justice Reed argued that federal admiralty law is grounded in English Law which has long since established that marine insurance contracts require strict compliance, and that leaving the decision to state governments hinders the development of a uniform federal admiralty body of law.

== Subsequent developments ==
The Supreme Court's ruling in Wilburn Boat has been subject to a great deal of criticism. Most critics of the decision argue that it was poorly reasoned and poorly articulated. As a result, multiple levels of uncertainty were created; more specifically, there has been a great deal of confusion over which state's law should govern a given marine insurance contract and the apparent unpredictability of the prospective outcomes. Several critics argue that Wilburn Boat is bad law and should be reconsidered by the Supreme Court or overruled via federal statute, however Wilburn Boat still remains good law today.
