= Witmer v. United States =

- Supreme Court of the United States

Argued February 1, 1955 Decided March 14, 1955
- Full case name: Philip Andrew Witmer v. United States of America
- Citations: 348 U.S. 375 (more) 75 S. Ct. 392; 99 L. Ed. 2d 428; 1955 U.S. LEXIS 1078

Case history
- Prior: United States v. Witmer, 115 F. Supp. 19 (M.D. Pa. 1953); affirmed, 213 F.2d 95 (3d Cir. 1954); cert. granted, 348 U.S. 812 (1954).

Questions presented
- Whether the Selective Service System properly denied petitioner Witmer's conscientious objector status.

Holding
- Affirmed

Court membership
- Chief Justice Earl Warren Associate Justices Hugo Black · Stanley F. Reed; Felix Frankfurter · William O. Douglas; Harold H. Burton · Tom C. Clark; Sherman Minton

Case opinions
- Majority: Clark, joined by Warren, Reed, Frankfurter, Burton, Harlan
- Concurrence: Minton
- Dissent: Black, joined by Douglas

Laws applied
- Universal Military Training and Service Act

Witmer v. United States, 348 U.S. 375 (1955), was a case in which the Supreme Court of the United States upheld a draft board's rejection of Jehovah's Witness claim of conscientious objector status as lacking sincerity.

== Background ==
On January 31 1951, Philip Andrew Witmer filed a classification questionnaire as required by 50 U. S. C. App. § 456 (j), and an letter stating that he worked hat factory for 40 hours and worked on his father's farm. In his questionnaire, Witmer claimed to be a "minister or student preparing for ministry" and a conscientious objector but failed to fill out the specifications supporting his objections to combatant or non-combatant service. Witmer requested a classification as a farmer and wrote that he would contribute to the war through his farm work.

Less than a week after posting his claim, Witmer left his job at the hat factory. On February 21, 1951 the local Board denied Witmer's claim for classification as a farmer and a conscientious objector. Witmer appealed 8 days later requesting to be classified as a minister. At the local Board hearing of the appeal Witmer presented an affidavit from a local Jehovah's Witness stating that he engaged in preaching and a written statement that he carries a Bible and study aids door to door. He further claims in his written statement that to be ordained as a minister did not require attending seminary or performing funerals or marriage ceremonies. The board concluded that the evidence did not warrant the classification as a minister and forward the case to the Department of Justice.

The FBI interviewed Witmer and reported that Witmer was very religious and sincere and that he said it was wrong to go to war. At the Department of Justice hearing, the officer recommended that based on the entire file with the interview that Witmer be classified as an conscientious objector. The Department of Justice, concluded that Witmer's claim be denied on the basis that his statements were inconsistent with his offer to contribute to war efforts and retained that he be ordered to report for induction.

Whitmer refused and was convicted of failing to submit to the armed forces, violating the Military Selective Service Act by the United States District Court for the Middle District of Pennsylvania on September 25, 1953, and was affirmed by the United States Court of Appeals for the Third Circuit on May 13, 1954.

== Opinion ==
The court affirmed the lower courts decision. The Court argued that sincerity of religious beliefs is a subjective question requiring evidence of honesty and good faith. The Court then assessed that Witmer’s demeanor appeared sincere, but his inconsistent statements of claiming different classifications and making contradictory promises cast doubt on his sincerity citing Witmer's admission of claiming to be a farmer and promising to support war efforts despite claiming conscientious objection.

== See also ==
- List of United States Supreme Court cases, volume 348
- List of Supreme Court cases involving Jehovah's Witnesses
