= Arkansas v. Texas =

- Supreme Court of the United States

Argued October 21, 1953 Decided November 16, 1953
- Full case name: State of Arkansas v. State of Texas et al.
- Citations: 346 U.S. 368 (more) 74 S.Ct. 109, 98 L.Ed. 80

Holding
- The corporation was not an indispensable party to a suit between states over alleged tortious interference; because a state university was an official state instrumentality, an injury to the university was an injury to the state for the purpose of establishing original jurisdiction in the United States Supreme Court.

Court membership
- Chief Justice Earl Warren Associate Justices Hugo Black · Stanley F. Reed; Felix Frankfurter · William O. Douglas; Robert H. Jackson · Harold H. Burton; Tom C. Clark · Sherman Minton

Case opinions
- Majority: Douglas, joined by Warren, Black, Reed, Burton
- Dissent: Jackson, joined by Frankfurter, Clark, Minton

Arkansas v. Texas, 346 U.S. 368 (1953), was a United States Supreme Court case decided in 1953. It was brought in the Supreme Court directly under the Court's original jurisdiction, as a suit filed by the state of Arkansas against the state of Texas. The suit concerned a contract between the Texas-based William Buchanan Foundation and the University of Arkansas which provided that the Foundation would provide $500,000 to the university's Arkansas State Medical Center for construction of a new floor. Arkansas submitted a motion for leave to file a complaint with the Supreme Court, alleging that Texas was interfering with its contract.

In a 5-4 decision, the Court ultimately held that the underlying suit was between two states, and that the Foundation was not an indispensable party to the suit. The Court also held that the University of Arkansas was an "official state instrumentality" under Arkansas law, and that as a result, "for purposes of our original jurisdiction, any injury under the contract to the University is an injury to Arkansas." Accordingly, the Court continued the motion filed by Arkansas to permit the ongoing litigation regarding the legality of the William Buchanan Foundation providing funding to the Arkansas hospital under Texas law. Justice William O. Douglas delivered the majority opinion, and Justice Robert H. Jackson authored a dissenting opinion.
