= Davis v. United States =

United States Supreme Court cases titled Davis v. United States:

- Davis v. United States, 589 U.S. ___ (2020), a per curiam opinion
- Davis v. United States (2011), 564 U.S. 229 (good-faith exception to the exclusionary rule)
- Davis v. United States (1994), 512 U.S. 452 (invocation of the right to counsel under Miranda)
- Davis v. United States (1990), 495 U.S. 472 (charitable deductions under §170 of the Internal Revenue Code)
- Davis v. United States (1974), 417 U.S. 333
- Davis v. United States (1973), 411 U.S. 233
- Davis v. United States (1969), 394 U.S. 574
- Davis v. United States (1960), 364 U.S. 505
- Davis v. United States (1946), 328 U.S. 582
- Davis v. United States (1897), 165 U.S. 373
- Davis v. United States (1895), 160 U.S. 469

== See also ==
- United States v. Davis (disambiguation)
