= Runkle v. United States =

- Supreme Court of the United States

Argued April 22, 1887 Decided May 27, 1887
- Full case name: Runkle v. United States
- Citations: 122 U.S. 543 (more) 7 S. Ct. 1141; 30 L. Ed. 1167; 1887 U.S. LEXIS 2136

Holding
- The president cannot delegate the power vested in him to pass finally upon a court-martial sentence because he is the only person bestowed with the judicial power of making a final determination.

Court membership
- Chief Justice Morrison Waite Associate Justices Samuel F. Miller · Stephen J. Field; Joseph P. Bradley · John M. Harlan; Stanley Matthews · Horace Gray; Samuel Blatchford

Case opinion
- Majority: Waite, joined by unanimous

Runkle v. United States, 122 U.S. 543 (1887), was a case in which the Supreme Court of the United States determined that the president cannot delegate the power vested in him to approve the proceedings and sentence of a court-martial because the president is the only person bestowed with the judicial power of making a final determination.

== Background ==
Benjamin Piatt Runkle, a Civil War veteran who was wounded at the Battle of Shiloh, was, from 1867 to 1870, serving as an active duty army major and disbursing officer in the Freedmen's Bureau for the State of Kentucky. In 1870, he was placed on the retired list as a major, but continued as a disbursing officer, until he was arrested and tried before a court-martial. The court-martial found Runkle guilty of conduct unbecoming an officer and gentleman and of violating the March 2, 1863, c. 67, § 1, Act of Congress. His sentence was imprisonment, payment of a fine, and dismissal from the army, where he had been serving on the retired list and drawing retired pay. The Secretary of War, W. W. Belknap, reviewed the proceedings, and in 1873, issued an order approving Runkle's conviction, but in consideration of his war service and wounds, granted Runkle executive clemency in the name of the President and eliminated the fine and prison sentence. However, his dismissal from the army remained in effect. Under the law at that time, any court martial sentence involving an officer's dismissal in peacetime needed to be confirmed by the President and there was no indication in this order that the conviction was confirmed by President Ulysses S. Grant.

On the same day that he was cashiered, Runkle petitioned President Grant, complaining that his sentence had not been confirmed by the President himself. This petition was referred by Grant to the Judge Advocate General for review. It remained open when President Rutherford B. Hayes came into office, as President Grant had done nothing further in the matter. Hayes then picked it up as unfinished business and registered an order of disapproval, revoking the 1873 order dismissing Runkle.

The August 4, 1877 executive order of President Hayes, disapproving the conviction, details the history:

EXECUTIVE MANSION, WASHINGTON, August 4, 1877.
In the Matter of the Application of Major Benjamin P. Runkle, U. S. Army, (retired.)
The record of official action heretofore taken in the premises shows the following facts, to-wit: First. That on the fourteenth of October, 1872, Major Runkle was found guilty by court-martial upon the following charges, to-wit: 'Charge 1. Violation of the act of congress approved March 2, 1863, c. 67, 1. Charge 2. Conduct unbecoming an officer and a gentleman.' Second. That on the sixteenth of January 1873, W. W. Belknap, then secretary of war, approved the proceedings of said court, and thereupon caused general order No. 7, series of 1873, to issue from the war department, by which it was announced that Major Benjamin P. Runkle was cashiered from the military service of the United States. Third. That subsequent to the date of said general order No. 7, to-wit, on the sixteenth day of January 1873, Major Runkle presented to the president a petition, setting forth that the proceedings of said court had not been approved by the president of the United States, as required by law; that said conviction was unjust; that the record of said proceedings was not in form or substance sufficient in law to warrant the issuing of said order; and asking the revocation and annulment of the same. Fourth. That, in pursuance of this petition, the record of the official action theretofore had in the premises was, by direction of the president, Ulysses S. Grant, referred to the judge advocate general of the United States army for review and report. Fifth. That thereupon the judge advocate general reviewed the case, and made his report thereon, in which it is reported and determined, among other things, that, in the proceedings had upon the trial of the case by said court, 'it is nowhere affirmatively established that he (Major Runkle) actually appropriated any money to his own use.' It also appears in said report that the conviction of said Runkle, upon charge one as aforesaid, is sustained upon the opinion that sufficient proof of the crime of embezzlement on the part of the accused was disclosed by the evidence before the court. And with respect to charge two no reference to the same is made in said report, except to deny the sufficiency of the evidence in the case, for a conviction upon the fourteenth specification thereof; and it is to be observed that the thirteen remaining specifications under this charge are identical with the thirteen specifications under charge one. The judge advocate general further finds and determines in said report as follows, to-wit: 'For alleged failures to pay, or to pay in full,' on the part of the subagents, 'I am of the opinion that the accused cannot justly be held liable.' Sixth. That no subsequent proceedings have been had with reference to said report, and that the said petition of said Runkle now awaits further and final action thereon. Whereupon, having caused the said record, together with said report, to be laid before me, and having carefully considered the same, I am of opinion that the said conviction is not sustained by the evidence in the case, and the same, together with the sentence of the court thereon, are hereby disapproved; and it is directed that said order No. 7, so far as it relates to said Runkle, be revoked.

— R. B. HAYES.

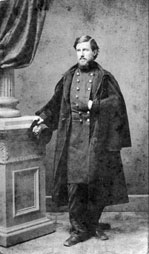
Benjamin Piatt Runkle

On the authority of the executive order, Runkle was given retirement pay – both from the date of the Hayes order going forward and back pay to the date he was dismissed. In 1882, he made a claim for additional longevity pay, which was referred to the Court of Claims. In the Court of Claims the government challenged his right to any pay at all, asserting that Hayes did not have the right to revoke the 1873 order confirming Runkle's dismissal.

== Opinion of the Court ==
The opinion of the Court, delivered by Chief Justice Waite, concludes:

Under these circumstances, we cannot say it positively and distinctly appears that the proceedings of the court-martial have ever in fact been approved or confirmed, in whole or in part, by the President of the United States, as the articles of war required, before the sentence could be carried into execution. Consequently, Major Runkle was never legally cashiered or dismissed from the army, and he is entitled to his longevity pay, as well as that which he has already received for his regular pay, both before the order of Secretary Belknap was revoked and afterwards.

Such being our view of the case, it is unnecessary to consider any of the other questions which were referred to the Court of Claims. Neither do we decide what the precise form of an order of the President approving the proceedings and sentence of a court-martial should be, nor that his own signature must be affixed thereto. But we are clearly of opinion that it will not be sufficient unless it is authenticated in a way to show otherwise than argumentatively that it is the result of the judgment of the President himself, and that it is not a mere departmental order which might or might not have attracted his personal attention. The fact that the order was his own should not be left to inference only.

The judgment of the Court of Claims is reversed, and the cause remanded for further proceedings in conformity with this opinion.

== Subsequent developments ==
Subsequent cases, United States v. Fletcher, 148 U.S. 84 (1893) and Bishop v. United States, 197 U.S. 334 (1905), both, in effect, repudiate the Runkle decision, in that the Runkle circumstances were so exceptional that it is not a safe precedent.

From the Fletcher decision:

The views of the Judge Advocate General, and the action of the Secretary in 1888 upon a reference of the subject in answer to the petition of Captain Fletcher, presented to the President, March 27 of that year, were induced by the case of Runkle v. United States, 122 U. S. 543, and the present decision of the Court of Claims was based upon it. Reference to the report of that case shows that the circumstances were so exceptional as to render it hardly a safe precedent in any other.

It appeared therein that the proceedings, findings, and sentence of the court-martial were transmitted to the Secretary of War, who on January 16, 1873, wrote upon the record an order approving the proceedings, with certain exceptions, and the findings and sentence, together with the further statement that, in view of the unanimous recommendation by the members of the court that the accused should receive executive clemency, and other facts, the President was pleased to remit all of the sentence except so much as directed cashiering, and that thereupon the Secretary issued a general order announcing the sentence, as thus modified. It further appeared that thereafter, and on the same day, Major Runkle presented to President Grant a petition insisting that the proceedings had not been approved by him as required by law; that the conviction was unjust; that the record was insufficient to warrant the issuing of the order, and asking its revocation and annulment; whereupon, in pursuance of the petition, the record of the official action theretofore had was, by direction of the President, referred to the Judge Advocate General for review and report; that this report was subsequently made, and with the petition was found by President Hayes awaiting further and final action thereon, and, being taken up by him as unfinished business, the conviction and sentence were disapproved, and the order of January 16, 1873, revoked.

This Court was of opinion that the order was capable of division into two separate parts, one relating to the approval of the proceedings and sentence and the other to the executive clemency which was invoked and exercised, and that under the circumstances, which are recapitulated, it could not be said that it positively and distinctly appeared that the proceedings had ever in fact been approved or confirmed by the President as required by the articles of war.

The facts that there was no reference to Article 65 in the Secretary's endorsement; that the objection that President Grant had not personally examined and approved of the proceedings was taken and urged upon President Grant himself immediately upon the promulgation of the sentence, and that he entertained the objection, thereby recognizing the contention, seemed to make it a matter of argument whether he had personally acted in the premises.

If it had been affirmatively stated that the proceedings were submitted, perhaps the action of President Grant in the matter of the application might have been ascribed to some other ground than doubt as to his examination of the proceedings; but as the record stood, this Court apparently thought that the presumptions conflicted, and therefore felt constrained to the conclusion announced.

However, according to Joshua Kastenberg, a professor of law at the University of New Mexico, the Supreme court, in 1958 in Harmon v. Brucker, 355 U.S. 579 (1958) reaffirmed a basic tenet of Runkle without citing to the case. A president, as well as the Department of Defense, is bound by its own internal rules. (The Court, in Vitarelli v. Seaton and Service v. Dulles also determined this rule applied to civil service positions outside of the military establishment). Thus, Runkle remains an important part of the military law. Moreover, there is a corollary rule in Runkle that a president must also follow statutory law in regard to courts-martial.

== See also ==
- United States v. Fletcher, 148 U.S. 84 (1893)
- Bishop v. United States, 197 U.S. 334 (1905)
