= List of United States Supreme Court cases, volume 329 =

This is a list of all the United States Supreme Court cases from volume 329 of the United States Reports:

Case name	Citation	Date decided
Halliburton Oil Well Cementing Company v. Walker	329 U.S. 1	1946
Cleveland v. United States (1946)	329 U.S. 14	1946
Champlin Refining Company v. United States	329 U.S. 29	1946
United States v. Band of Tillamooks	329 U.S. 40	1946
United States v. Howard P. Foley Company	329 U.S. 64	1946
Richfield Oil Corp. v. State Board of Equalization	329 U.S. 69	1946
American Power and Light Company v. Securities and Exchange Commission	329 U.S. 90	1946
Alma Motor Company v. Timken-Detroit Axle Company	329 U.S. 129	1946
Unemployment Comp. Commission v. Aragon	329 U.S. 143	1946
Vanston Bondholders Protective Commission v. Green	329 U.S. 156	1946
Carter v. Illinois	329 U.S. 173	1946
Ballard v. United States	329 U.S. 187	1946
United States v. Bruno	329 U.S. 207	1946
Fiswick v. United States	329 U.S. 211	1946
Federal Communications Commission v. WOKO, Inc.	329 U.S. 223	1946
United States v. Carmack	329 U.S. 230	1946
Freeman v. Hewit	329 U.S. 249	1946
United States v. Ruzicka	329 U.S. 287	1946
Rothensies v. Electric Storage Battery Company	329 U.S. 296	1946
Eagles v. United States ex rel. Samuels	329 U.S. 304	1946
Eagles v. United States ex rel. Horowitz	329 U.S. 317	1946
National Labor Relations Board v. A.J. Tower Company	329 U.S. 324	1946
Gibson v. United States	329 U.S. 338	1946
Illinois ex rel. Gordon v. Campbell	329 U.S. 362	1946
United States v. Sheridan	329 U.S. 379	1946
Edward Katzinger Company v. Chicago Metallic Manufacturing Company	329 U.S. 394	1947
MacGregor v. Westinghouse Electric and Manufacturing Company	329 U.S. 402	1947
International Harvester Company v. Evatt	329 U.S. 416	1947
United States v. Seatrain Lines, Inc.	329 U.S. 424	1947
Steele v. General Mills, Inc.	329 U.S. 433	1947
FRS v. Agnew	329 U.S. 441	1947
Jesionowski v. Boston and M.R.R. Company	329 U.S. 452	1947
Louisiana ex rel. Francis v. Resweber	329 U.S. 459	1947
Anderson v. Yungkau	329 U.S. 482	1947
Hickman v. Taylor	329 U.S. 495	1947
Railway Conductors v. Swan	329 U.S. 520	1947
Parker v. Fleming	329 U.S. 531	1947
Patterson v. Lamb	329 U.S. 539	1947
Morris v. Jones	329 U.S. 545	1947
Gardner v. New Jersey	329 U.S. 565	1947
United States v. Thayer-West Point Hotel Company	329 U.S. 585	1947
Krug v. Santa Fe P. Railroad Company	329 U.S. 591	1947
Albrecht v. United States	329 U.S. 599	1947
Insurance Group Comm. v. Denver and R.G.W. Railroad Company	329 U.S. 607	1947
Transparent-Wrap Machine Corp. v. Stokes and Smith Company	329 U.S. 637	1947
Ellis v. Union Pacific Railroad Company	329 U.S. 649	1947
United States v. New York Rayon Importing Company (2)	329 U.S. 654	1947
De Meerleer v. Michigan	329 U.S. 663	1947
