= Gibson v. United States =

- Supreme Court of the United States

Argued January 2–3, 1946 Reargued October 23, 1946 Decided December 23, 1946
- Full case name: Gibson v. United States
- Citations: 329 U.S. 338 (more) 67 S. Ct. 301; 91 L. Ed. 331; 1946 U.S. LEXIS 1584

Case history
- Prior: Gibson v. United States, 149 F.2d 751 (8th Cir. 1945); cert. granted, 326 U.S. 708 (1945); Dodez v. United States, 154 F.2d 637 (6th Cir. 1946); cert. granted, 328 U.S. 828 (1946)

Court membership
- Chief Justice Fred M. Vinson Associate Justices Hugo Black · Stanley F. Reed; Felix Frankfurter · William O. Douglas; Frank Murphy · Robert H. Jackson; Wiley B. Rutledge · Harold H. Burton

Case opinions
- Majority: Rutledge, joined by unanimous
- Concurrence: Murphy

Gibson v. United States, 329 U.S. 338 (1946), was a case in which the Supreme Court of the United States ruled that a Jehovah's Witness minister could appeal his classification without first appearing at induction camp.
