= List of United States Supreme Court cases, volume 138 =

Supreme Court of the United States
- Interactive map of Supreme Court of the United States
- 38°53′26″N 77°00′16″W
- Established: March 4, 1789; 236 years ago
- Location: Washington, D.C.
- Coordinates: 38°53′26″N 77°00′16″W
- Composition method: Presidential nomination with Senate confirmation
- Authorised by: Constitution of the United States, Art. III, § 1 for accuracy
- Judge term length: life tenure, subject to impeachment
- Number of positions: 9 (by statute)
- Website: supremecourt.gov

This is a list of cases reported in volume 138 of United States Reports, decided by the Supreme Court of the United States in 1891.

== Justices of the Supreme Court at the time of volume 138 U.S. ==
The Supreme Court is established by Article III, Section 1 of the Constitution of the United States, which says: "The judicial Power of the United States, shall be vested in one supreme Court . . .". The size of the Court is not specified; the Constitution leaves it to Congress to set the number of justices. Under the Judiciary Act of 1789 Congress originally fixed the number of justices at six (one chief justice and five associate justices). Since 1789 Congress has varied the size of the Court from six to seven, nine, ten, and back to nine justices (always including one chief justice).

When the cases in volume 138 U.S. were decided the Court comprised the following nine members:

Portrait	Justice	Office	Home State	Succeeded	Date confirmed by the Senate (Vote)	Tenure on Supreme Court
	Melville Fuller	Chief Justice	Illinois	Morrison Waite	July 20, 1888 (41–20)	October 8, 1888 – July 4, 1910 (Died)
	Stephen Johnson Field	Associate Justice	California	newly created seat	March 10, 1863 (Acclamation)	May 10, 1863 – December 1, 1897 (Retired)
	Joseph P. Bradley	Associate Justice	New Jersey	newly created seat	March 21, 1870 (46–9)	March 23, 1870 – January 22, 1892 (Died)
	John Marshall Harlan	Associate Justice	Kentucky	David Davis	November 29, 1877 (Acclamation)	December 10, 1877 – October 14, 1911 (Died)
	Horace Gray	Associate Justice	Massachusetts	Nathan Clifford	December 20, 1881 (51–5)	January 9, 1882 – September 15, 1902 (Died)
	Samuel Blatchford	Associate Justice	New York	Ward Hunt	March 22, 1882 (Acclamation)	April 3, 1882 – July 7, 1893 (Died)
	Lucius Quintus Cincinnatus Lamar	Associate Justice	Mississippi	William Burnham Woods	January 16, 1888 (32–28)	January 18, 1888 – January 23, 1893 (Died)
	David Josiah Brewer	Associate Justice	Kansas	Stanley Matthews	December 18, 1889 (53–11)	January 6, 1890 – March 28, 1910 (Died)
	Henry Billings Brown	Associate Justice	Michigan	Samuel Freeman Miller	December 29, 1890 (Acclamation)	January 5, 1891 – May 28, 1906 (Retired)

== Citation style ==
Under the Judiciary Act of 1789 the federal court structure at the time comprised District Courts, which had general trial jurisdiction; Circuit Courts, which had mixed trial and appellate (from the US District Courts) jurisdiction; and the United States Supreme Court, which had appellate jurisdiction over the federal District and Circuit courts—and for certain issues over state courts. The Supreme Court also had limited original jurisdiction (i.e., in which cases could be filed directly with the Supreme Court without first having been heard by a lower federal or state court). There were one or more federal District Courts and/or Circuit Courts in each state, territory, or other geographical region.

The Judiciary Act of 1891 created the United States Courts of Appeals and reassigned the jurisdiction of most routine appeals from the district and circuit courts to these appellate courts. The Act created nine new courts that were originally known as the "United States Circuit Courts of Appeals." The new courts had jurisdiction over most appeals of lower court decisions. The Supreme Court could review either legal issues that a court of appeals certified or decisions of court of appeals by writ of certiorari. The change resulted in an immediate reduction in the Supreme Court's workload (from 623 cases filed in 1890 to 379 in 1891 and 275 in 1892).

Bluebook citation style is used for case names, citations, and jurisdictions.

- "# Cir." = United States Court of Appeals
  - e.g., "3d Cir." = United States Court of Appeals for the Third Circuit
- "C.C.D." = United States Circuit Court for the District of . . .
  - e.g.,"C.C.D.N.J." = United States Circuit Court for the District of New Jersey
- "D." = United States District Court for the District of . . .
  - e.g.,"D. Mass." = United States District Court for the District of Massachusetts
- "E." = Eastern; "M." = Middle; "N." = Northern; "S." = Southern; "W." = Western
  - e.g.,"C.C.S.D.N.Y." = United States Circuit Court for the Southern District of New York
  - e.g.,"M.D. Ala." = United States District Court for the Middle District of Alabama
- "Ct. Cl." = United States Court of Claims
- The abbreviation of a state's name alone indicates the highest appellate court in that state's judiciary at the time.
  - e.g.,"Pa." = Supreme Court of Pennsylvania
  - e.g.,"Me." = Supreme Judicial Court of Maine

== List of cases in volume 138 U.S. ==
Case Name	Page and year	Opinion of the Court	Concurring opinion(s)	Dissenting opinion(s)	Lower Court	Disposition
Joy v. City of St. Louis	1 (1891)	Blatchford	none	none	C.C.E.D. Mo.	affirmed
Butler v. Gage	52 (1891)	Fuller	none	none	Colo.	dismissed
United States v. Connor	61 (1891)	Brewer	none	none	Ct. Cl.	reversed
Pleasant Township v. Aetna Life Insurance Company	67 (1891)	Brewer	none	none	C.C.N.D. Ohio	reversed
Brimmer v. Rebman	78 (1891)	Harlan	none	none	C.C.E.D. Va.	affirmed
United States v. Central Pacific Railroad Company	84 (1891)	Bradley	none	none	Ct. Cl.	reversed
United States v. Kingsley	87 (1891)	Brown	none	none	Ct. Cl.	reversed
City of Superior v. Ripley	93 (1891)	Brown	none	none	C.C.D. Neb.	affirmed
Sioux City St. Railway Company v. City of Sioux City	98 (1891)	Blatchford	none	none	Iowa	affirmed
Reagan v. Aiken	109 (1891)	Brewer	none	none	C.C.E.D. Tex.	affirmed
Bent v. Thompson	114 (1891)	Blatchford	none	none	Sup. Ct. Terr. N.M.	affirmed
Consolidated Roller Mill Company v. Walker	124 (1891)	Blatchford	none	none	C.C.W.D. Pa.	affirmed
Tubbs v. Wilhoit	134 (1891)	Field	none	none	Cal.	affirmed
Whitehead v. Shattuck	146 (1891)	Field	none	none	C.C.N.D. Iowa	affirmed
Cook v. United States	157 (1891)	Harlan	none	none	C.C.E.D. Tex.	reversed
Chicago, Santa Fe and California Railroad Company v. Price, McGavock and Company	185 (1891)	Harlan	none	none	C.C.N.D. Ill.	affirmed
Coburn v. Cedar Valley Land and Cattle Company, Ltd.	196 (1891)	Fuller	none	none	C.C.W.D. Mo.	affirmed
Miller v. Clark	223 (1891)	Blatchford	none	none	C.C.D. Conn.	dismissed
City of St. Louis v. Rutz	226 (1891)	Blatchford	none	none	C.C.S.D. Ill.	affirmed
Waterman v. Mackenzie	252 (1891)	Gray	none	none	C.C.S.D.N.Y.	affirmed
Beardsley v. Beardsley	262 (1891)	Brewer	none	none	C.C.E.D. Ark.	affirmed
North v. Peters	271 (1891)	Lamar	none	none	Sup. Ct. Terr. Dakota	affirmed
Kaufman v. Wooters	285 (1891)	Harlan	none	none	Tex.	affirmed
Wheeling and Belmont Bridge Company v. Wheeling Bridge Company	287 (1891)	Field	none	none	Va.	affirmed
United States v. Green	293 (1891)	Fuller	none	none	Ct. Cl.	reversed
Kansas City, Fort Scott and Memphis Railroad Company v. Daughtry	298 (1891)	Fuller	none	none	Tenn.	affirmed
Ames v. Moir and Company	306 (1891)	Harlan	none	none	Ill.	affirmed
United States Mortgage Company v. Sperry	313 (1891)	Harlan	none	none	C.C.N.D. Ill.	reversed
Alexander v. United States	353 (1891)	Brown	none	none	C.C.W.D. Ark.	reversed
Crumpton v. United States	361 (1891)	Brown	none	none	C.C.W.D. Ark.	affirmed
Upshur v. Briscoe	365 (1891)	Blatchford	none	none	La.	affirmed
Wadsworth v. Adams	380 (1891)	Harlan	none	none	C.C.N.D. Ala.	reversed
Brown v. Trousdale	389 (1891)	Fuller	none	none	C.C.D. Ky.	reversed
Beaupre, Keogh and Company v. Noyes Brothers and Cutler	397 (1891)	Harlan	none	none	Minn.	affirmed
Cheney v. Hughes	403 (1891)	Fuller	none	none	C.C.D. Neb.	withdrawal of transcript denied
In re Cooper	404 (1891)	Fuller	none	none	D. Alaska	prohibition granted
Central Trust Company v. Kneeland	414 (1891)	Brewer	none	none	C.C.N.D. Ohio	affirmed
Russell v. Post	425 (1891)	Brewer	none	none	C.C.S.D.N.Y.	reversed
Case Manufacturing Company v. Soxman	431 (1891)	Brewer	none	none	C.C.W.D. Pa.	affirmed
Simmons v. Saul	439 (1891)	Lamar	none	none	C.C.E.D. Pa.	affirmed
In re Graham	461 (1891)	Field	none	none	Wis.	affirmed
Clay v. Field	464 (1891)	Bradley	none	none	C.C.N.D. Miss.	multiple
Bunt v. Sierra Butte Gold Mining Company	483 (1891)	Gray	none	none	C.C.N.D. Cal.	affirmed
Hanner v. Moulton	486 (1891)	Blatchford	none	none	C.C.N.D. Tex.	affirmed
Missouri ex rel. Carey v. Andriano	496 (1891)	Brown	none	none	Mo.	dismissed
Louisville, Evansville and St. Louis Railroad Company v. Wilson	501 (1891)	Brewer	none	none	C.C.S.D. Ill.	reversed
Kneeland v. American Loan and Trust Company	509 (1891)	Brewer	none	none	C.C.D. Ind.	multiple
Williams v. United States	514 (1891)	Brewer	none	none	C.C.D. Nev.	affirmed
Cressey v. Meyer	525 (1891)	Brewer	none	none	C.C.E.D. La.	affirmed
Barney v. Oelrichs	529 (1891)	Fuller	none	none	C.C.S.D.N.Y.	reversed
Lawrence Manufacturing Company v. Tennessee Manufacturing Company	537 (1891)	Fuller	none	none	C.C.M.D. Tenn.	affirmed
Evidence that a defendant used a trademark with the intent to falsely represent his product and pass it off as the plaintiff's product is evidence of infringement.
Lawrence Manufacturing Company v. Janesville Cotton Mills	552 (1891)	Fuller	none	none	C.C.W.D. Wis.	affirmed
Schell's Executors v. Fauché	562 (1891)	Brown	none	none	C.C.S.D.N.Y.	affirmed
Heath v. Wallace	573 (1891)	Lamar	none	none	Cal.	affirmed
Ducie v. Ford	587 (1891)	Brown	none	none	Sup. Ct. Terr. Mont.	affirmed
City of New Orleans v. Gaines's Administrator	595 (1891)	Bradley	none	none	C.C.E.D. La.	decree modified
Troy Laundry Machinery Company v. Dolph	617 (1891)	Brewer	none	none	C.C.N.D.N.Y.	reversed
Gormley v. Bunyan	623 (1891)	Lamar	none	none	C.C.N.D. Ill.	affirmed
Cook County v. Calumet and Chicago Canal and Dock Company	635 (1891)	Fuller	none	none	Ill.	dismissed
City of San Francisco v. LeRoy	656 (1891)	Field	none	none	C.C.N.D. Cal.	affirmed
Merrill v. Town of Monticello	673 (1891)	Lamar	none	none	C.C.D. Ind.	affirmed
Anderson v. Watt	694 (1891)	Fuller	none	none	C.C.N.D. Fla.	reversed
