= Dickinson v. United States =

- Supreme Court of the United States

Argued October 21, 1953 Decided November 30, 1953
- Full case name: Dickinson v. United States
- Citations: 346 U.S. 389 (more) 74 S. Ct. 152; 98 L. Ed. 2d 132; 1953 U.S. LEXIS 1425

Court membership
- Chief Justice Earl Warren Associate Justices Hugo Black · Stanley F. Reed; Felix Frankfurter · William O. Douglas; Robert H. Jackson · Harold H. Burton; Tom C. Clark · Sherman Minton

Case opinions
- Majority: Clark, joined by Warren, Black, Reed, Frankfurter, Douglas
- Dissent: Jackson, joined by Burton, Minton

Dickinson v. United States, 346 U.S. 389 (1953), was a case in which the Supreme Court of the United States held there was no basis for denying a petitioner's (a Jehovah's Witness) claim to ministerial exemption from military service, and his conviction for refusing to submit to his local board's induction order was reversed.

== Decision of the Court ==
Justice Clark delivered the opinion of the Court.

The Court ruled that classification as minister is not available to all members of a sect notwithstanding doctrine that all are ministers; but part-time secular work does not, without more, disqualify member from satisfying the ministerial exemption.

== See also ==
- List of United States Supreme Court cases, volume 346
