= List of United States Supreme Court cases, volume 105 =

Supreme Court of the United States
- Interactive map of Supreme Court of the United States
- 38°53′26″N 77°00′16″W
- Established: March 4, 1789; 236 years ago
- Location: Washington, D.C.
- Coordinates: 38°53′26″N 77°00′16″W
- Composition method: Presidential nomination with Senate confirmation
- Authorised by: Constitution of the United States, Art. III, § 1
- Judge term length: life tenure, subject to impeachment and removal
- Number of positions: 9 (by statute)
- Website: supremecourt.gov

This is a list of cases reported in volume 105 of United States Reports, decided by the Supreme Court of the United States in 1881 and 1882.

== Justices of the Supreme Court at the time of volume 105 U.S. ==
The Supreme Court is established by Article III, Section 1 of the Constitution of the United States, which says: "The judicial Power of the United States, shall be vested in one supreme Court . . .". The size of the Court is not specified; the Constitution leaves it to Congress to set the number of justices. Under the Judiciary Act of 1789 Congress originally fixed the number of justices at six (one chief justice and five associate justices). Since 1789 Congress has varied the size of the Court from six to seven, nine, ten, and back to nine justices (always including one chief justice).

When the cases in volume 105 U.S. were decided the Court comprised nine of the following ten members at one time (Ward Hunt retired in January 1882 and was replaced by Samuel Blatchford in April 1882):

Portrait	Justice	Office	Home State	Succeeded	Date confirmed by the Senate (Vote)	Tenure on Supreme Court
	Morrison Waite	Chief Justice	Ohio	Salmon P. Chase	January 21, 1874 (63–0)	March 4, 1874 – March 23, 1888 (Died)
	Samuel Freeman Miller	Associate Justice	Iowa	Peter Vivian Daniel	July 16, 1862 (Acclamation)	July 21, 1862 – October 13, 1890 (Died)
	Stephen Johnson Field	Associate Justice	California	newly created seat	March 10, 1863 (Acclamation)	May 10, 1863 – December 1, 1897 (Retired)
	Joseph P. Bradley	Associate Justice	New Jersey	newly created seat	March 21, 1870 (46–9)	March 23, 1870 – January 22, 1892 (Died)
	Ward Hunt	Associate Justice	New York	Samuel Nelson	December 11, 1872 (Acclamation)	January 9, 1873 – January 27, 1882 (Retired)
	John Marshall Harlan	Associate Justice	Kentucky	David Davis	November 29, 1877 (Acclamation)	December 10, 1877 – October 14, 1911 (Died)
	William Burnham Woods	Associate Justice	Georgia	William Strong	December 21, 1880 (39–8)	January 5, 1881 – May 14, 1887 (Died)
	Stanley Matthews	Associate Justice	Ohio	Noah Haynes Swayne	May 12, 1881 (24–23)	May 17, 1881 – March 22, 1889 (Died)
	Horace Gray	Associate Justice	Massachusetts	Nathan Clifford	December 20, 1881 (51–5)	January 9, 1882 – September 15, 1902 (Died)
	Samuel Blatchford	Associate Justice	New York	Ward Hunt	March 22, 1882 (Acclamation)	April 3, 1882 – July 7, 1893 (Died)

== Citation style ==
Under the Judiciary Act of 1789 the federal court structure at the time comprised District Courts, which had general trial jurisdiction; Circuit Courts, which had mixed trial and appellate (from the US District Courts) jurisdiction; and the United States Supreme Court, which had appellate jurisdiction over the federal District and Circuit courts—and for certain issues over state courts. The Supreme Court also had limited original jurisdiction (i.e., in which cases could be filed directly with the Supreme Court without first having been heard by a lower federal or state court). There were one or more federal District Courts and/or Circuit Courts in each state, territory, or other geographical region.

Bluebook citation style is used for case names, citations, and jurisdictions.

- "C.C.D." = United States Circuit Court for the District of . . .
  - e.g.,"C.C.D.N.J." = United States Circuit Court for the District of New Jersey
- "D." = United States District Court for the District of . . .
  - e.g.,"D. Mass." = United States District Court for the District of Massachusetts
- "E." = Eastern; "M." = Middle; "N." = Northern; "S." = Southern; "W." = Western
  - e.g.,"C.C.S.D.N.Y." = United States Circuit Court for the Southern District of New York
  - e.g.,"M.D. Ala." = United States District Court for the Middle District of Alabama
- "Ct. Cl." = United States Court of Claims
- The abbreviation of a state's name alone indicates the highest appellate court in that state's judiciary at the time.
  - e.g.,"Pa." = Supreme Court of Pennsylvania
  - e.g.,"Me." = Supreme Judicial Court of Maine

== List of cases in volume 105 U.S. ==
Case Name	Page & year	Opinion of the Court	Concurring opinion(s)	Dissenting opinion(s)	Lower court	Disposition of case
Wade v. Town of Walnut	1 (1882)	Waite	none	none	C.C.N.D. Ill.	affirmed
Swope v. Leffingwell	3 (1882)	Waite	none	none	Mo.	affirmed
Clark v. Fredericks	4 (1882)	Waite	none	none	Sup. Ct. Terr. Mont.	affirmed
Bartholow v. Trustees	6 (1881)	Waite	none	none	C.C.S.D. Ill.	dismissed
Pollard v. Vinton	7 (1882)	Miller	none	none	C.C.D. Ky.	affirmed
Greenwood v. Union F.R.R. Co.	13 (1882)	Miller	none	none	C.C.D. Mass.	affirmed
The Scotland	24 (1882)	Bradley	none	none	C.C.E.D.N.Y.	multiple
United States v. Dix Island Granite Co.	37 (1882)	Field	none	none	Ct. Cl.	affirmed
Young v. American S.S. Co.	41 (1882)	Field	none	none	Pa.	affirmed
Head v. Hargrave	45 (1882)	Field	none	none	Sup. Ct. Terr. Ariz.	reversed
Smith v. Field	52 (1882)	Field	none	none	C.C.N.D. Ill.	affirmed
Mathews v. Boston Mach. Co.	54 (1882)	Bradley	none	none	C.C.D. Mass.	affirmed
Taylor v. City of Ypsilanti	60 (1882)	Harlan	none	none	C.C.E.D. Mich.	reversed
New Buffalo Twp. v. Cambria Iron Co.	73 (1882)	Harlan	none	none	C.C.W.D. Mich.	affirmed
Hammock v. Farmers' L. & T. Co.	77 (1882)	Harlan	none	none	C.C.S.D. Ill.	affirmed
Lehnbeuter v. Holthaus	94 (1882)	Woods	none	none	C.C.E.D. Mo.	reversed
United States v. Temple	97 (1882)	Woods	none	none	Ct. Cl.	affirmed
Blennerhassett v. Sherman	100 (1882)	Woods	none	none	C.C.D. Iowa	affirmed
McCormick v. Knox	122 (1882)	Woods	none	none	Sup. Ct. D.C.	affirmed
Ager v. Murray	126 (1882)	Gray	none	none	Sup. Ct. D.C.	affirmed
Rives v. Duke	132 (1882)	Gray	none	none	C.C.W.D. Va.	affirmed
Scovill v. Thayer	143 (1882)	Woods	none	none	C.C.D. Mass.	reversed
Bantz v. Frantz	160 (1882)	Woods	none	none	C.C.D. Ky.	affirmed
New Orleans et al. R.R. Co. v. Ellerman	166 (1882)	Matthews	none	none	C.C.D. La.	reversed
Marine et al. Co. v. Bradley	175 (1882)	Matthews	none	none	C.C.D.S.C.	affirmed
United States v. Hunt	183 (1882)	Matthews	none	none	C.C.S.D. Miss.	reversed
Root v. Lake Shore et al. Ry. Co.	189 (1882)	Matthews	none	none	C.C.N.D. Ill.	affirmed
Cecil Nat'l Bank v. Watsontown Bank	217 (1882)	Matthews	none	none	C.C.W.D. Pa.	reversed
Warren v. Stoddart	224 (1882)	Woods	none	none	C.C.N.D. Ill.	affirmed
Chatfield v. Boyle & Co.	231 (1882)	Waite	none	none	C.C.W.D. Tenn.	dismissed
Hecht v. Boughton	235 (1882)	Waite	none	none	Sup. Ct. Terr. Wyo.	dismissed
Davenport v. Dodge Cnty.	237 (1882)	Waite	none	none	C.C.D. Neb.	reversed
United States v. Tyler	244 (1882)	Miller	none	none	Ct. Cl.	affirmed
Burley v. Flint	247 (1882)	Miller	none	none	C.C.N.D. Ill.	affirmed
Scheefer v. Washington City et al. R.R. Co.	249 (1882)	Miller	none	none	C.C.E.D. Va.	affirmed
Goulds' Mfg. Co. v. Cowing	253 (1882)	Waite	none	none	C.C.N.D.N.Y.	reversed
Memphis et al. R.R. Co. v. Loftin	258 (1882)	Waite	none	none	Ark.	affirmed
Brandies v. Cochrane	262 (1882)	Waite	none	none	C.C.N.D. Ill.	dismissal denied
United States v. Union P.R.R. Co.	263 (1882)	Waite	none	none	Sup. Ct. Terr. Wyo.	dismissed
Keyser v. Farr	265 (1881)	Waite	none	none	Sup. Ct. D.C.	dismissal denied
James v. McCormack	265 (1881)	Waite	none	none	not indicated	dismissal confirmed
The Schooner S.C. Tryon	267 (1882)	Waite	none	none	C.C.D. Md.	affirmed
Simmons v. Ogle	271 (1882)	Miller	none	none	C.C.S.D. Ill.	reversed
Louisiana v. Pilsbury	278 (1882)	Field	none	none	La.	reversed
Russell v. Stansell	303 (1882)	Waite	none	none	N.D. Miss.	dismissed
Albany Cnty. v. Stanley	305 (1882)	Miller	none	none	C.C.N.D.N.Y.	reversed
Hills v. National A.E. Bank	319 (1882)	Miller	none	none	C.C.N.D.N.Y.	reversed
Evansville Nat'l Bank v. Britton	322 (1882)	Miller	none	Waite, Bradley	C.C.D. Ind.	affirmed
American L. Ins. Co. v. Town of Bruce	328 (1882)	Harlan	none	none	C.C.N.D. Ill.	reversed
Sullivan v. Burnett	334 (1882)	Harlan	none	none	C.C.E.D. Mo.	affirmed
Ottawa Mfg. Co. v. First Nat'l Bank	342 (1882)	Harlan	none	none	C.C.N.D. Ill.	affirmed
City of Manchester v. Ericsson	347 (1882)	Miller	none	none	C.C.E.D. Va.	reversed
Knickerbocker L. Ins. Co. v. Foley	350 (1882)	Field	none	none	C.C.D.S.C.	affirmed
Bennecke v. Connecticut M.L. Ins. Co.	355 (1882)	Woods	none	none	C.C.S.D. Ill.	affirmed
St. Anna's Asylum v. City of New Orleans	362 (1882)	Bradley	none	Miller	La.	reversed
Moultrie Cnty. v. Fairfield	370 (1882)	Woods	none	none	C.C.S.D. Ill.	affirmed
The Francis Wright	381 (1882)	Waite	none	none	C.C.S.D.N.Y.	affirmed
Hewitt, Norton & Co. v. Phelps	393 (1882)	Matthews	none	none	C.C.S.D. Miss.	affirmed
Hauselt v. Harrison	401 (1882)	Matthews	none	none	C.C.W.D. Pa.	reversed
City of Hannibal v. Fauntleroy	408 (1882)	Matthews	none	none	C.C.E.D. Mo.	affirmed
United States v. Emholt	414 (1882)	Gray	none	none	C.C.W.D. Wis.	dismissed
Hitchcock v. Buchanan	416 (1882)	Gray	none	none	C.C.S.D. Ill.	affirmed
United States v. Rindskopf	418 (1882)	Field	none	none	C.C.E.D. Wis.	reversed
Marchand v. Frellsen	423 (1882)	Woods	none	none	C.C.D. La.	affirmed
Dowell v. Mitchell	430 (1882)	Woods	none	none	C.C.E.D. Ark.	reversed
Russell v. Farley	433 (1882)	Bradley	none	none	C.C.D. Minn.	affirmed
The S.S. Osborne	447 (1882)	Waite	none	none	C.C.N.D. Ohio	affirmed
Ex parte Slayton	451 (1882)	Waite	none	none	N.D. Ill.	certification
Louisiana v. Taylor	454 (1882)	Matthews	none	none	C.C.E.D. Mo.	affirmed
Western Union Tel. Co. v. Texas	460 (1882)	Waite	none	none	Tex.	reversed
Thatcher v. Rockwell	467 (1882)	Waite	none	none	Colo.	affirmed
Newport et al. Co. v. United States	470 (1882)	Waite	none	Miller, Field, Bradley	C.C.S.D. Ohio	affirmed
French, Hanna, & Co. v. Gapen	509 (1882)	Waite	none	none	C.C.D. Ind.	reversed
Internal I.F. v. Greenough	527 (1882)	Bradley	none	Miller	C.C.N.D. Fla.	multiple
Johnson v. Flushing et al. R.R. Co.	539 (1882)	Woods	none	none	C.C.E.D.N.Y.	affirmed
Guidet v. City of Brooklyn	550 (1882)	Waite	none	none	C.C.E.D.N.Y.	affirmed
Gordon v. Butler	553 (1882)	Field	none	none	C.C.N.D.N.Y.	reversed
Cincinnati et al. Co. v. Town of Catlettsburg	559 (1882)	Miller	none	none	C.C.D. Ky.	affirmed
Packing Co. Cases	566 (1882)	Woods	none	none	C.C.N.D. Ill.	affirmed
Corbin v. Van Brunt	576 (1882)	Waite	none	none	C.C.E.D.N.Y.	affirmed
Ex parte Hoard	578 (1882)	Waite	none	none	D.W. Va.	mandamus denied
Webster Loom Co. v. Higgins	580 (1882)	Bradley	none	none	C.C.S.D.N.Y.	reversed
City of New Orleans v. Morris	600 (1882)	Miller	none	none	C.C.D. La.	reversed
Oglesby v. Attrill	605 (1882)	Field	none	none	C.C.D. La.	affirmed
United States v. Carll	611 (1882)	Gray	none	none	C.C.S.D.N.Y.	certification
Lincoln v. French	614 (1882)	Field	none	none	C.C.D. Cal.	reversed
Bridge v. Excelsior Mfg. Co.	618 (1882)	Bradley	none	none	C.C.E.D. Mo.	affirmed
United States v. Smith	620 (1882)	Miller	none	none	Ct. Cl.	reversed
New York G. & I. Co. v. Louisiana	622 (1882)	Waite	none	none	La.	affirmed
Leathers v. Blessing	626 (1882)	Blatchford	none	none	C.C.D. La.	affirmed
The Potomac	630 (1882)	Gray	none	none	C.C.D. La.	multiple
Venable & Son v. Richards	636 (1882)	Harlan	none	none	C.C.E.D. Va.	affirmed
Upton v. McLaughlin	640 (1882)	Blatchford	none	none	Sup. Ct. Terr. Wyo.	reversed
Ex parte Boyd	647 (1882)	Matthews	none	none	C.C.S.D.N.Y.	habeas corpus denied
Corbin v. Black Hawk Cnty.	659 (1882)	Blatchford	none	none	C.C.D. Iowa	affirmed
Post v. Kendall Cnty.	667 (1882)	Gray	none	none	C.C.N.D. Ill.	affirmed
Harvey v. United States	671 (1882)	Blatchford	none	none	Ct. Cl.	reversed
Swift et al. Co. v. United States	691 (1882)	Matthews	none	none	Ct. Cl.	reversed
Ex parte Mason	696 (1882)	Waite	none	none	General court-martial	habeas corpus denied
Wurts v. Hoagland Iron Co.	701 (1882)	Bradley	none	none	N.J.	certification
Stevenson v. Texas & P. Ry. Co.	703 (1882)	Matthews	none	none	C.C.W.D. Tex.	affirmed
Marsh v. McPherson	709 (1882)	Matthews	none	none	C.C.D. Neb.	reversed
Flanders v. Seelye	718 (1882)	Blatchford	none	none	C.C.D. La.	reversed
Ralls Cnty. v. Douglass	728 (1882)	Waite	none	none	C.C.E.D. Mo.	affirmed
Ralls Cnty. v. United States	733 (1882)	Waite	none	none	C.C.E.D. Mo.	affirmed
Lewis v. Barbour Cnty.	739 (1882)	Harlan	none	none	C.C.D. Kan.	reversed
Carite v. Trotot	751 (1882)	Matthews	none	none	C.C.D. La.	reversed
Paper-Bag Cases	766 (1882)	Waite	none	none	C.C.S.D. Ohio	multiple
The Mamie	773 (1881)	Waite	none	none	C.C.E.D. Mich.	dismissal denied
