= List of United States Supreme Court cases, volume 114 =

Supreme Court of the United States
- Interactive map of Supreme Court of the United States
- 38°53′26″N 77°00′16″W
- Established: March 4, 1789; 236 years ago
- Location: Washington, D.C.
- Coordinates: 38°53′26″N 77°00′16″W
- Composition method: Presidential nomination with Senate confirmation
- Authorised by: Constitution of the United States, Art. III, § 1
- Judge term length: life tenure, subject to impeachment and removal
- Number of positions: 9 (by statute)
- Website: supremecourt.gov

This is a list of cases reported in volume 114 of United States Reports, decided by the Supreme Court of the United States in 1885.

== Justices of the Supreme Court at the time of volume 114 U.S. ==
The Supreme Court is established by Article III, Section 1 of the Constitution of the United States, which says: "The judicial Power of the United States, shall be vested in one supreme Court . . .". The size of the Court is not specified; the Constitution leaves it to Congress to set the number of justices. Under the Judiciary Act of 1789 Congress originally fixed the number of justices at six (one chief justice and five associate justices). Since 1789 Congress has varied the size of the Court from six to seven, nine, ten, and back to nine justices (always including one chief justice).

When the cases in volume 114 U.S. were decided the Court comprised the following nine members:

Portrait	Justice	Office	Home State	Succeeded	Date confirmed by the Senate (Vote)	Tenure on Supreme Court
	Morrison Waite	Chief Justice	Ohio	Salmon P. Chase	January 21, 1874 (63–0)	March 4, 1874 – March 23, 1888 (Died)
	Samuel Freeman Miller	Associate Justice	Iowa	Peter Vivian Daniel	July 16, 1862 (Acclamation)	July 21, 1862 – October 13, 1890 (Died)
	Stephen Johnson Field	Associate Justice	California	newly created seat	March 10, 1863 (Acclamation)	May 10, 1863 – December 1, 1897 (Retired)
	Joseph P. Bradley	Associate Justice	New Jersey	newly created seat	March 21, 1870 (46–9)	March 23, 1870 – January 22, 1892 (Died)
	John Marshall Harlan	Associate Justice	Kentucky	David Davis	November 29, 1877 (Acclamation)	December 10, 1877 – October 14, 1911 (Died)
	William Burnham Woods	Associate Justice	Georgia	William Strong	December 21, 1880 (39–8)	January 5, 1881 – May 14, 1887 (Died)
	Stanley Matthews	Associate Justice	Ohio	Noah Haynes Swayne	May 12, 1881 (24–23)	May 17, 1881 – March 22, 1889 (Died)
	Horace Gray	Associate Justice	Massachusetts	Nathan Clifford	December 20, 1881 (51–5)	January 9, 1882 – September 15, 1902 (Died)
	Samuel Blatchford	Associate Justice	New York	Ward Hunt	March 22, 1882 (Acclamation)	April 3, 1882 – July 7, 1893 (Died)

== Citation style ==
Under the Judiciary Act of 1789 the federal court structure at the time comprised District Courts, which had general trial jurisdiction; Circuit Courts, which had mixed trial and appellate (from the US District Courts) jurisdiction; and the United States Supreme Court, which had appellate jurisdiction over the federal District and Circuit courts—and for certain issues over state courts. The Supreme Court also had limited original jurisdiction (i.e., in which cases could be filed directly with the Supreme Court without first having been heard by a lower federal or state court). There were one or more federal District Courts and/or Circuit Courts in each state, territory, or other geographical region.

Bluebook citation style is used for case names, citations, and jurisdictions.

- "C.C.D." = United States Circuit Court for the District of . . .
  - e.g.,"C.C.D.N.J." = United States Circuit Court for the District of New Jersey
- "D." = United States District Court for the District of . . .
  - e.g.,"D. Mass." = United States District Court for the District of Massachusetts
- "E." = Eastern; "M." = Middle; "N." = Northern; "S." = Southern; "W." = Western
  - e.g.,"C.C.S.D.N.Y." = United States Circuit Court for the Southern District of New York
  - e.g.,"M.D. Ala." = United States District Court for the Middle District of Alabama
- "Ct. Cl." = United States Court of Claims
- The abbreviation of a state's name alone indicates the highest appellate court in that state's judiciary at the time.
  - e.g.,"Pa." = Supreme Court of Pennsylvania
  - e.g.,"Me." = Supreme Judicial Court of Maine

== List of cases in volume 114 U.S. ==
Case Name	Page and year	Opinion of the Court	Concurring opinion(s)	Dissenting opinion(s)	Lower Court	Disposition
Thompson v. Boisselier	1 (1885)	Blatchford	none	none	C.C.S.D.N.Y.	reversed
Murphy v. Ramsey	15 (1885)	Matthews	none	none	Sup. Ct. Terr. Utah	multiple
Bohall v. Dilla	47 (1885)	Field	none	none	Cal.	affirmed
Louisville and Nashville Railroad Company v. Ide	52 (1885)	Waite	none	none	C.C.S.D.N.Y.	affirmed
Putnam v. Ingraham	57 (1885)	Waite	none	none	C.C.D. Conn.	affirmed
St. Louis and San Francisco Railway Company v. Wilson	60 (1885)	Waite	none	none	C.C.E.D. Mo.	affirmed
Sargent v. Hall's Safe and Lock Company	63 (1885)	Blatchford	none	none	C.C.S.D. Ohio	affirmed
Electric Railroad Signal Company v. Hall Railway Signal Company	87 (1885)	Matthews	none	none	C.C.D. Conn.	affirmed
Thomson v. Wooster	104 (1885)	Bradley	none	none	C.C.S.D.N.Y.	affirmed
Hayes v. City of Holly Springs	120 (1885)	Blatchford	none	none	N.D. Miss.	affirmed
Mower v. Fletcher	127 (1885)	Waite	none	none	Cal.	dismissal denied
Butterworth v. Hill	128 (1885)	Waite	none	none	C.C.D. Vt.	reversed
Detroit City Railway Company v. Guthard	133 (1885)	Waite	none	none	Mich.	dismissed
Village of Farmington v. Pillsbury	138 (1885)	Waite	none	none	C.C.D. Me.	reversed
Ex parte Hughes	147 (1885)	Waite	none	none	D. Or.	mandamus denied
Stephenson v. Brooklyn Crosstown Railroad Company	149 (1885)	Woods	none	none	C.C.E.D.N.Y.	affirmed
Chapman v. Brewer	158 (1885)	Blatchford	none	none	C.C.W.D. Mich.	affirmed
Ex parte Morgan	174 (1885)	Waite	none	none	C.C.D. Ind.	mandamus denied
Chesapeake and Ohio Railway Company v. Miller	176 (1885)	Matthews	none	none	W. Va.	affirmed
City of Litchfield v. Ballou	190 (1885)	Miller	none	none	C.C.S.D. Ill.	reversed
Gloucester Ferry Company v. Pennsylvania	196 (1885)	Field	none	none	Pa.	reversed
Lámar v. Micou	218 (1885)	Gray	none	none	C.C.S.D.N.Y.	rehearing denied
Xenia Bank v. Stewart	224 (1885)	Woods	none	none	C.C.S.D. Ohio	affirmed
United States v. Minor	233 (1885)	Miller	none	none	C.C.D. Cal.	reversed
Weaver v. Field	244 (1885)	Blatchford	none	none	C.C.E.D. La.	affirmed
Doe v. Hyde	247 (1885)	Blatchford	none	none	C.C.D. Cal.	affirmed
Bissell v. Foss	252 (1885)	Woods	none	none	C.C.D. Colo.	affirmed
Bradstreet Company v. Higgins	262 (1885)	Waite	none	none	not indicated	judgment amended
Boatmen's Savings Bank v. State Savings Association	265 (1885)	Waite	none	none	Mo. Ct. App.	dismissed
Poindexter v. Greenhow, Treasurer of Richmond I	269 (1885)	per curiam	None	None	Va. Hustings Ct.	multiple
Poindexter v. Greenhow, Treasurer of Richmond II	270 (1885)	Matthews	None	None	Va. Hustings Ct.	reversed
White v. Greenhow, Treasurer of Richmond	307 (1885)	Matthews	None	None	C.C.E.D. Va.	reversed
Chaffin v. Taylor	309 (1885)	Matthews	None	None	Va.	reversed
Allen v. Baltimore and Ohio Railroad Company	311 (1885)	Matthews	None	None	C.C.W.D. Va.	affirmed
Carter v. Greenhow, Treasurer of Richmond	317 (1885)	Matthews	None	None	C.C.E.D. Va.	affirmed
Pleasants v. Greenhow, Treasurer of Richmond	323 (1885)	Matthews	none	none	C.C.E.D. Va.	affirmed
Marye v. Parsons	325 (1885)	Matthews	None	Bradley	C.C.E.D. Va.	reversed
Moore v. Greenhow, Treasurer of Richmond	338 (1885)	Matthews	None	None	Va.	affirmed
East Alabama Railway Company v. Doe ex rel. Visscher	340 (1885)	Blatchford	None	None	C.C.M.D. Ala.	reversed
The Belgenland	355 (1885)	Bradley	None	None	C.C.E.D. Pa.	affirmed
Walden v. Knevals	373 (1885)	Field	None	None	C.C.D. Neb.	affirmed
Pennsylvania National Bank v. Furness, Brinley and Company	376 (1885)	Field	none	none	C.C.E.D. Pa.	affirmed
Aurrecoechea v. Bangs	381 (1885)	Miller	None	None	Cal.	affirmed
Amy v. Shelby County	387 (1885)	Miller	None	None	Tenn.	affirmed
Huntley v. Huntley	394 (1885)	Harlan	none	none	Sup. Ct. D.C.	reversed
State National Bank v. United States	401 (1885)	Harlan	None	None	Ct. Cl.	affirmed
The Laura	411 (1885)	Harlan	none	none	C.C.S.D.N.Y.	affirmed
Ex parte Wilson	417 (1885)	Gray	none	none	E.D. Ark.	habeas corpus granted
United States v. Petit	429 (1885)	Waite	none	none	not indicated	certification
Dodge v. Knowles	430 (1885)	Gray	none	none	Sup. Ct. D.C.	reversed
Dobson v. Hartford Carpet Company	439 (1885)	Blatchford	none	none	C.C.E.D. Pa.	reversed
Western Electric Manufacturing Company v. Ansonia Brass and Copper Company	447 (1885)	Woods	None	None	C.C.D. Conn.	affirmed
District of Columbia v. Baltimore and Potomac Railroad Company	453 (1885)	Miller	None	None	Sup. Ct. D.C.	reversed
Pacific National Bank v. Mixter	463 (1885)	Waite	None	None	C.C.D. Mass.	dismissal denied
Cavender v. Cavender	464 (1885)	Woods	none	none	C.C.E.D. Mo.	affirmed
Burton v. West Jersey Ferry Company	474 (1885)	Harlan	None	None	C.C.E.D. Pa.	affirmed
Clawson v. United States	477 (1885)	Blatchford	None	None	Sup. Ct. Terr. Utah	affirmed
Hopt v. Utah	488 (1885)	Gray	None	None	Sup. Ct. Terr. Utah	reversed
Atlantic Phosphate Company v. Grafflin	492 (1885)	Blatchford	None	None	C.C.D.S.C.	affirmed
New Orleans, Spanish Fort and Lake Railroad Company v. Delamore	501 (1885)	Woods	None	None	La.	reversed
Sturges v. Carter	511 (1885)	Woods	None	None	C.C.N.D. Ohio	affirmed
Beecher Manufacturing Company v. Atwater Manufacturing Company	523 (1885)	Gray	None	None	C.C.D. Conn.	reversed
Fort Leavenworth Railroad Company v. Lowe	525 (1885)	Field	None	None	Kan.	affirmed
Chicago, Rock Island and Pacific Railroad Company v. McGlinn	542 (1885)	Field	None	None	Kan.	affirmed
Ex parte Hughes	548 (1885)	Waite	None	None	original	multiple
Martinsburg and Potomac Railroad Company v. March	549 (1885)	Harlan	None	None	D.W. Va.	reversed
Strang and Holland Brothers v. Lowery & Bradner	555 (1885)	Harlan	none	none	N.Y. Sup. Ct.	affirmed
Alling v. United States	562 (1885)	Miller	None	None	Ct. Cl.	reversed
Wales v. Whitney	564 (1885)	Miller	None	None	Sup. Ct. D.C.	affirmed
Richmond Mining Company v. Rose	576 (1885)	Miller	None	None	Nev.	affirmed
Wabash, St. Louis and Pacific Railway Company v. Ham	587 (1885)	Gray	None	None	C.C.D. Ind.	reversed
Macalester's Administrator v. Maryland	598 (1885)	Gray	None	None	C.C.D. Md.	affirmed
Wurts v. Hoagland	606 (1885)	Gray	None	None	N.J. Sup. Ct.	affirmed
Schofield v. Chicago, Milwaukee and St. Paul Railway Company	615 (1885)	Blatchford	None	None	C.C.D. Minn.	affirmed
United States v. Corson	619 (1885)	Harlan	None	None	Ct. Cl.	reversed
Brown and Jones v. Houston	622 (1885)	Bradley	None	None	La.	affirmed
Provident Savings Life Assurance Society v. Ford	635 (1885)	Bradley	none	none	N.Y. Sup. Ct.	affirmed
Ex parte Reggel	642 (1885)	Harlan	none	none	Dist. Ct. Terr. Utah	affirmed
Canal and Claiborne Streets Railroad Company v. Hart	654 (1885)	Blatchford	none	none	C.C.E.D. La.	affirmed
Stevens v. Memphis and Charleston Railroad Company	663 (1885)	Waite	none	none	C.C.W.D. Tenn.	affirmed
