= List of United States Supreme Court cases, volume 122 =

Supreme Court of the United States
- Interactive map of Supreme Court of the United States
- 38°53′26″N 77°00′16″W
- Established: March 4, 1789; 236 years ago
- Location: Washington, D.C.
- Coordinates: 38°53′26″N 77°00′16″W
- Composition method: Presidential nomination with Senate confirmation
- Authorised by: Constitution of the United States, Art. III, § 1
- Judge term length: life tenure, subject to impeachment and removal
- Number of positions: 9 (by statute)
- Website: supremecourt.gov

This is a list of cases reported in volume 122 of United States Reports, decided by the Supreme Court of the United States in 1887.

== Justices of the Supreme Court at the time of volume 122 U.S. ==
The Supreme Court is established by Article III, Section 1 of the Constitution of the United States, which says: "The judicial Power of the United States, shall be vested in one supreme Court . . .". The size of the Court is not specified; the Constitution leaves it to Congress to set the number of justices. Under the Judiciary Act of 1789, Congress originally fixed the number of justices at six (one chief justice and five associate justices). Since 1789, Congress has varied the size of the Court from six to seven, nine, ten, and back to nine justices (always including one chief justice).

When the cases in volume 122 U.S. were decided, the Court comprised the following nine members:

Portrait	Justice	Office	Home State	Succeeded	Date confirmed by the Senate (Vote)	Tenure on Supreme Court
	Morrison Waite	Chief Justice	Ohio	Salmon P. Chase	January 21, 1874 (63–0)	March 4, 1874 – March 23, 1888 (Died)
	Samuel Freeman Miller	Associate Justice	Iowa	Peter Vivian Daniel	July 16, 1862 (Acclamation)	July 21, 1862 – October 13, 1890 (Died)
	Stephen Johnson Field	Associate Justice	California	newly created seat	March 10, 1863 (Acclamation)	May 10, 1863 – December 1, 1897 (Retired)
	Joseph P. Bradley	Associate Justice	New Jersey	newly created seat	March 21, 1870 (46–9)	March 23, 1870 – January 22, 1892 (Died)
	John Marshall Harlan	Associate Justice	Kentucky	David Davis	November 29, 1877 (Acclamation)	December 10, 1877 – October 14, 1911 (Died)
	William Burnham Woods	Associate Justice	Georgia	William Strong	December 21, 1880 (39–8)	January 5, 1881 – May 14, 1887 (Died)
	Stanley Matthews	Associate Justice	Ohio	Noah Haynes Swayne	May 12, 1881 (24–23)	May 17, 1881 – March 22, 1889 (Died)
	Horace Gray	Associate Justice	Massachusetts	Nathan Clifford	December 20, 1881 (51–5)	January 9, 1882 – September 15, 1902 (Died)
	Samuel Blatchford	Associate Justice	New York	Ward Hunt	March 22, 1882 (Acclamation)	April 3, 1882 – July 7, 1893 (Died)

== Citation style ==
Under the Judiciary Act of 1789, the federal court structure at the time comprised District Courts, which had general trial jurisdiction; Circuit Courts, which had mixed trial and appellate (from the US District Courts) jurisdiction; and the United States Supreme Court, which had appellate jurisdiction over the federal District and Circuit Courts—and for certain issues over state courts. The Supreme Court also had limited original jurisdiction (i.e., in which cases could be filed directly with the Supreme Court without first having been heard by a lower federal or state court). There were one or more federal District Courts and/or Circuit Courts in each state, territory, or other geographical region.

Bluebook citation style is used for case names, citations, and jurisdictions.

- "C.C.D." = United States Circuit Court for the District of . . .
  - e.g.,"C.C.D.N.J." = United States Circuit Court for the District of New Jersey
- "D." = United States District Court for the District of . . .
  - e.g.,"D. Mass." = United States District Court for the District of Massachusetts
- "E." = Eastern; "M." = Middle; "N." = Northern; "S." = Southern; "W." = Western
  - e.g.,"C.C.S.D.N.Y." = United States Circuit Court for the Southern District of New York
  - e.g.,"M.D. Ala." = United States District Court for the Middle District of Alabama
- "Ct. Cl." = United States Court of Claims
- The abbreviation of a state's name alone indicates the highest appellate court in that state's judiciary at the time.
  - e.g.,"Pa." = Supreme Court of Pennsylvania
  - e.g.,"Me." = Supreme Judicial Court of Maine

== List of cases in volume 122 U.S. ==
Case Name	Page and year	Opinion of the Court	Concurring opinion(s)	Dissenting opinion(s)	Lower Court	Disposition
Barnes v. Chicago, Milwaukee and St. Paul Railway	1 (1887)	Waite	None	None	C.C.E.D. Wis.	affirmed
State Bank v. St. Louis Rail Fastening Company	21 (1887)	Gray	None	None	C.C.S.D. Ill.	dismissed
Hanna v. Maas	24 (1887)	Gray	None	None	C.C.W.D. Mich.	affirmed
Gibson v. Shufeldt and Company	27 (1887)	Gray	None	None	C.C.E.D. Va.	multiple
Eames v. Andrews	40 (1887)	Matthews	None	None	C.C.D. Conn.	affirmed
Beedle v. Bennett	71 (1887)	Matthews	None	None	C.C.N.D. Ohio	affirmed
St. Louis, Iron Mountain and Southern Railway Company v. Knight	79 (1887)	Matthews	None	None	C.C.N.D. Ill.	reversed
The Manitoba	97 (1887)	Blatchford	None	None	C.C.E.D. Mich.	affirmed
Parsons v. Robinson	112 (1887)	Waite	None	None	C.C.E.D. Pa.	dismissed
Bartram v. Robertson	116 (1887)	Field	None	None	C.C.S.D.N.Y.	affirmed
Topliff v. Topliff	121 (1887)	Matthews	None	None	C.C.N.D. Ohio	affirmed
Warren v. Moody	132 (1887)	Blatchford	None	None	C.C.M.D. Ala.	reversed
Davis v. Patrick	138 (1887)	Blatchford	None	None	C.C.D. Neb.	reversed
Williams v. City of Albany	154 (1887)	Field	None	None	C.C.N.D.N.Y.	affirmed
Bullard v. Des Moines and Fort Dodge Railroad Company	167 (1887)	Miller	None	None	Iowa	affirmed
Sanger v. Nightingale	176 (1887)	Miller	None	None	C.C.S.D. Ga.	affirmed
Tuttle v. Detroit, Grand Haven and Milwaukee Railway Company	189 (1887)	Bradley	None	Miller	C.C.E.D. Mich.	affirmed
United States v. C.A. Auffmordt and Company	197 (1887)	Blatchford	None	None	C.C.S.D.N.Y.	affirmed
Benziger Brothers v. Robertson	211 (1887)	Blatchford	None	None	C.C.S.D.N.Y.	affirmed
Wisner v. Brown	214 (1887)	Bradley	None	None	Mich.	affirmed
Simonton v. Sibley	220 (1887)	Gray	None	None	C.C.W.D.N.C.	affirmed
Shepherd v. Thompson	231 (1887)	Gray	None	None	Sup. Ct. D.C.	reversed
Drexel v. Berney	241 (1887)	Matthews	none	none	C.C.S.D.N.Y.	reversed
The Hesper	256 (1887)	Blatchford	none	none	C.C.E.D. Tex.	affirmed
Porter v. Pittsburg (sic) Bessemer Steel Company	267 (1887)	Blatchford	none	none	C.C.D. Ind.	rehearing denied
Seibert v. Lewis	284 (1887)	Matthews	none	none	C.C.E.D. Mo.	affirmed
Minneapolis Gas Light Company v. Kerr Murray Manufacturing Company	300 (1887)	Matthews	none	none	C.C.D. Minn.	affirmed
Harshman v. Knox County	306 (1887)	Matthews	none	none	C.C.E.D. Mo.	reversed
Walter v. Bickham and Moore	320 (1887)	Harlan	none	none	C.C.N.D. Miss.	affirmed
Philadelphia and Southern Steamship Company v. Pennsylvania	326 (1887)	Bradley	none	none	Pa.	reversed
Western Union Telegraph Company v. Pendleton	347 (1887)	Field	none	none	Ind.	reversed
St. Louis, Iron Mountain and Southern Railway Company v. Vickers	360 (1887)	Waite	none	none	C.C.E.D. Ark.	affirmed
Whitsitt v. Union Depot and Railroad Company	363 (1887)	Waite	none	none	C.C.D. Colo.	dismissed
Maxwell Land Grant Case	365 (1887)	Miller	none	none	C.C.D. Colo.	rehearing denied
Merchants' Insurance Company v. Allen	376 (1887)	Waite	none	none	C.C.E.D. La.	rehearing denied
Adams v. Collier	382 (1887)	Harlan	none	none	C.C.S.D. Ga.	reversed
Goodlett v. Louisville and Nashville Railroad Company	391 (1887)	Harlan	none	none	C.C.M.D. Tenn.	affirmed
New Process Fermentation Company v. Maus	413 (1887)	Blatchford	none	none	C.C.D. Ind.	reversed
Gandy v. Marble	432 (1887)	Blatchford	none	none	Sup. Ct. D.C.	affirmed
Paxton v. Griswold	441 (1887)	Bradley	none	none	C.C.E.D. Pa.	affirmed
Estes v. Gunter	450 (1887)	Field	none	none	C.C.N.D. Miss.	reversed
Travelers' Insurance Company v. Edwards	457 (1887)	Miller	none	none	C.C.N.D.N.Y.	affirmed
Clinton v. Missouri Pacific Railroad Company	469 (1887)	Miller	none	none	C.C.D. Neb.	reversed
Argentine Mining Company v. Terrible Mining Company	478 (1887)	Field	none	none	C.C.D. Colo.	affirmed
Struthers v. Drexel	487 (1887)	Matthews	none	none	C.C.W.D. Pa.	affirmed
Bean v. Patterson	496 (1887)	Field	none	none	C.C.W.D. Mo.	affirmed
Northwestern Mutual Life Insurance Company v. Muskegon National Bank	501 (1887)	Miller	none	none	C.C.S.D.N.Y.	affirmed
Burlington, Cedar Rapids and Northern Railway Company v. Dunn	513 (1887)	Waite	none	none	Minn.	reversed
Morrison v. Kennedy and Durr	518 (1887)	Waite	none	none	C.C.D. Cal.	affirmed
Texas Transportation Company v. Seeligson	519 (1887)	Waite	none	none	C.C.E.D. Tex.	affirmed
Fisher v. Perkins	522 (1887)	Waite	none	none	Ky. Super. Ct.	dismissed
McLeod and Reid v. Fourth National Bank	528 (1887)	Miller	none	none	C.C.E.D. Mo.	affirmed
Thorn Wire Hedge Company v. Fuller and Patrick	535 (1887)	Waite	none	none	C.C.D. Minn.	affirmed
Runkle v. United States	543 (1887)	Waite	none	none	Ct. Cl.	reversed
Chicago, Burlington and Kansas City Railroad v. Guffey	561 (1887)	Harlan	none	none	Mo.	rehearing denied
Shippen v. Bowen	575 (1887)	Harlan	none	none	C.C.D. Colo.	reversed
Sun Mutual Insurance Company v. Kountz Line	583 (1887)	Harlan	none	none	C.C.E.D. La.	reversed
Denver and Rio Grande Western Railroad Company v. Harris	597 (1887)	Harlan	none	none	Sup. Ct. Terr. N.M.	affirmed
Rice v. United States	611 (1887)	Waite	none	none	Ct. Cl.	affirmed
