= List of United States Supreme Court cases, volume 348 =

This is a list of all the United States Supreme Court cases from volume 348 of the United States Reports:

Case name	Citation	Date decided
In re Isserman	348 U.S. 1	1954
Chandler v. Fretag	348 U.S. 3	1954
Offutt v. United States	348 U.S. 11	1954
McAllister v. United States	348 U.S. 19	1954
Berman v. Parker	348 U.S. 26	1954
Marine Cooks v. Arnold	348 U.S. 37	1954
Lumbermen's Mut. Cas. Co. v. Elbert	348 U.S. 48	1954
Castle v. Hayes Freight Lines, Inc.	348 U.S. 61	1954
Watson v. Employers Liability Assurance Corp.	348 U.S. 66	1954
Opper v. United States	348 U.S. 84	1954
Brooks v. NLRB	348 U.S. 96	1954
Massey v. Moore	348 U.S. 105	1954
United States v. Brown (1954)	348 U.S. 110	1954
Moore v. Mead's Fine Bread Co.	348 U.S. 115	1954
Holland v. United States	348 U.S. 121	1954
Friedberg v. United States	348 U.S. 142	1954
Smith v. United States (1954)	348 U.S. 147	1954
United States v. Calderon	348 U.S. 160	1954
Sullivan v. United States	348 U.S. 170	1954
Balt. Contractors, Inc. v. Bodinger	348 U.S. 176	1955
Comm'r v. Estate of Sternberger	348 U.S. 187	1955
Cox v. Roth	348 U.S. 207	1955
United States v. Acri	348 U.S. 211	1955
United States v. Liverpool & L. & G. Ins. Co.	348 U.S. 215	1955
United States v. Scovil	348 U.S. 218	1955
United States v. Shubert	348 U.S. 222	1955
United States v. International Boxing Club of New York, Inc.	348 U.S. 236	1955
United States v. Koppers Co.	348 U.S. 254	1955
Tee-Hit-Ton Indians v. United States	348 U.S. 272	1955
United States v. Guy W. Capps, Inc.	348 U.S. 296	1955
Wilburn Boat Co. v. Fireman's Fund Ins. Co.	348 U.S. 310	1955
Boudoin v. Lykes Bros. S.S. Co.	348 U.S. 336	1955
SEC v. Drexel & Co.	348 U.S. 341	1955
United States v. Cal. E. Line, Inc.	348 U.S. 351	1955
Nat'l City Bank v. Republic of China	348 U.S. 356	1955
Sapir v. United States	348 U.S. 373	1955
Witmer v. United States	348 U.S. 375	1955
Sicurella v. United States	348 U.S. 385	1955
Simmons v. United States	348 U.S. 397	1955
Gonzales v. United States	348 U.S. 407	1955
Lewis v. United States	348 U.S. 419	1955
Comm'r v. Glenshaw Glass Co.	348 U.S. 426	1955
Gen. Am. Investors Co. v. Comm'r	348 U.S. 434	1955
Salaried Employees v. Westinghouse Elec. Corp.	348 U.S. 437	1955
Weber v. Anheuser-Busch, Inc.	348 U.S. 468	1955
Williamson v. Lee Optical	348 U.S. 483	1955
FPC v. Colo. Interstate Gas Co.	348 U.S. 492	1955
United States v. Bramblett	348 U.S. 503	1955
Clothing Workers v. Richman Bros. Co.	348 U.S. 511	1955
United States v. Menasche	348 U.S. 528	1955
Shomberg v. United States	348 U.S. 540	1955
