= United States v. Davis =

United States v. Davis may refer to:

- United States v. Davis (1962), 370 U.S. 65 (1962), a U.S. Supreme Court opinion on tax treatment of divorce settlements
- United States v. Davis (2014), 785 F.3d 498 (11th Cir. 2015), an 11th Circuit ruling on the need for a warrant to obtain cell phone location data
- United States v. Davis (2019), 588 U.S. 445 (2019), a U.S. Supreme Court opinion on the residual clause of the Hobbs Act

== See also ==
- Davis v. United States (disambiguation)
