= List of United States Supreme Court cases, volume 216 =

Supreme Court of the United States
- Interactive map of Supreme Court of the United States
- 38°53′26″N 77°00′16″W
- Established: March 4, 1789; 237 years ago
- Location: Washington, D.C.
- Coordinates: 38°53′26″N 77°00′16″W
- Composition method: Presidential nomination with Senate confirmation
- Authorised by: Constitution of the United States, Art. III, § 1
- Judge term length: life tenure, subject to impeachment and removal
- Number of positions: 9 (by statute)
- Website: supremecourt.gov

This is a list of cases reported in volume 216 of United States Reports, decided by the Supreme Court of the United States in 1910.

== Justices of the Supreme Court at the time of volume 216 U.S. ==
The Supreme Court is established by Article III, Section 1 of the Constitution of the United States, which says: "The judicial Power of the United States, shall be vested in one supreme Court . . .". The size of the Court is not specified; the Constitution leaves it to Congress to set the number of justices. Under the Judiciary Act of 1789 Congress originally fixed the number of justices at six (one chief justice and five associate justices). Since 1789 Congress has varied the size of the Court from six to seven, nine, ten, and back to nine justices (always including one chief justice).

When the cases in volume 216 were decided the Court comprised the following nine members:

Portrait	Justice	Office	Home State	Succeeded	Date confirmed by the Senate (Vote)	Tenure on Supreme Court
	Melville Fuller	Chief Justice	Illinois	Morrison Waite	July 20, 1888 (41–20)	October 8, 1888 – July 4, 1910 (Died)
	John Marshall Harlan	Associate Justice	Kentucky	David Davis	November 29, 1877 (Acclamation)	December 10, 1877 – October 14, 1911 (Died)
	David Josiah Brewer	Associate Justice	Kansas	Stanley Matthews	December 18, 1889 (53–11)	January 6, 1890 – March 28, 1910 (Died)
	Edward Douglass White	Associate Justice	Louisiana	Samuel Blatchford	February 19, 1894 (Acclamation)	March 12, 1894 – December 18, 1910 (Continued as chief justice)
	Joseph McKenna	Associate Justice	California	Stephen Johnson Field	January 21, 1898 (Acclamation)	January 26, 1898 – January 5, 1925 (Retired)
	Oliver Wendell Holmes Jr.	Associate Justice	Massachusetts	Horace Gray	December 4, 1902 (Acclamation)	December 8, 1902 – January 12, 1932 (Retired)
	William R. Day	Associate Justice	Ohio	George Shiras Jr.	February 23, 1903 (Acclamation)	March 2, 1903 – November 13, 1922 (Retired)
	William Henry Moody	Associate Justice	Massachusetts	Henry Billings Brown	December 12, 1906 (Acclamation)	December 17, 1906 – November 20, 1910 (Retired)
	Horace Harmon Lurton	Associate Justice	Tennessee	Rufus W. Peckham	December 20, 1909 (Acclamation)	January 3, 1910 – July 12, 1914 (Died)

== Citation style ==
Under the Judiciary Act of 1789 the federal court structure at the time comprised District Courts, which had general trial jurisdiction; Circuit Courts, which had mixed trial and appellate (from the US District Courts) jurisdiction; and the United States Supreme Court, which had appellate jurisdiction over the federal District and Circuit courts—and for certain issues over state courts. The Supreme Court also had limited original jurisdiction (i.e., in which cases could be filed directly with the Supreme Court without first having been heard by a lower federal or state court). There were one or more federal District Courts and/or Circuit Courts in each state, territory, or other geographical region.

The Judiciary Act of 1891 created the United States Courts of Appeals and reassigned the jurisdiction of most routine appeals from the district and circuit courts to these appellate courts. The Act created nine new courts that were originally known as the "United States Circuit Courts of Appeals." The new courts had jurisdiction over most appeals of lower court decisions. The Supreme Court could review either legal issues that a court of appeals certified or decisions of court of appeals by writ of certiorari.

Bluebook citation style is used for case names, citations, and jurisdictions.

- "# Cir." = United States Court of Appeals
  - e.g., "3d Cir." = United States Court of Appeals for the Third Circuit
- "C.C.D." = United States Circuit Court for the District of . . .
  - e.g.,"C.C.D.N.J." = United States Circuit Court for the District of New Jersey
- "D." = United States District Court for the District of . . .
  - e.g.,"D. Mass." = United States District Court for the District of Massachusetts
- "E." = Eastern; "M." = Middle; "N." = Northern; "S." = Southern; "W." = Western
  - e.g.,"C.C.S.D.N.Y." = United States Circuit Court for the Southern District of New York
  - e.g.,"M.D. Ala." = United States District Court for the Middle District of Alabama
- "Ct. Cl." = United States Court of Claims
- The abbreviation of a state's name alone indicates the highest appellate court in that state's judiciary at the time.
  - e.g.,"Pa." = Supreme Court of Pennsylvania
  - e.g.,"Me." = Supreme Judicial Court of Maine

== List of cases in volume 216 U.S. ==
Case Name	Page and year	Opinion of the Court	Concurring opinion(s)	Dissenting opinion(s)	Lower Court	Disposition
Western Union Telegraph Company v. Kansas ex rel. Coleman	1 (1910)	Harlan	White	Holmes	Kan.	reversed
Pullman Company v. Kansas ex rel. Coleman	56 (1910)	Harlan	White	Holmes	Kan.	reversed
Cincinnati, New Orleans and Texas Pacific Railway Company v. J. Slade and E.M. Pless	78 (1910)	White	none	none	Ga. Ct. App.	dismissed
Conley v. Ballinger	84 (1910)	Holmes	none	none	C.C.D. Kan.	reversed
King v. West Virginia	92 (1910)	Holmes	none	none	W. Va.	dismissed
Babbitt v. Dutcher	102 (1910)	Fuller	none	none	S.D.N.Y.	reversed
In re Elkus	115 (1910)	Fuller	none	none	2d Cir.	certification
Woodside v. Beckham	117 (1910)	Fuller	none	none	C.C.N.D. Iowa	affirmed
Atlantic Coast Line Railroad Company v. Mazursky	122 (1910)	Fuller	none	none	S.C.	affirmed
Zartman v. First National Bank of Waterloo	134 (1910)	Fuller	none	none	Sup. Ct. N.Y.	affirmed
Childers v. McClaughry	139 (1910)	Fuller	none	none	D. Kan.	dismissed
Ludwig v. Western Union Telegraph Company	146 (1910)	Harlan	none	none	C.C.E.D. Ark.	affirmed
Western Union Telegraph Company v. Andrews	165 (1910)	Day	none	none	C.C.E.D. Ark.	reversed
Alvarez y Sanchez v. United States	167 (1910)	Harlan	none	none	Ct. Cl.	affirmed
Monongahela Bridge Company v. United States	177 (1910)	Harlan	none	none	W.D. Pa.	affirmed
Citizens' Central National Bank of New York v. Appleton	196 (1910)	Harlan	none	none	Sup. Ct. N.Y.	affirmed
Great Northern Railroad Company v. Minnesota	206 (1910)	Harlan	none	none	Minn.	affirmed
Chicago Great Western Railway Company v. Minnesota	234 (1910)	Harlan	none	none	Minn.	affirmed
Ballinger v. United States ex rel. Frost	240 (1910)	Brewer	none	none	D.C. Cir.	affirmed
Central Trust Company v. Central Trust Company of Illinois	251 (1910)	Brewer	none	none	7th Cir.	affirmed
Missouri Pacific Railway Company v. Kansas ex rel. State Board of Railroad Commissioners	262 (1910)	White	none	none	Kan.	affirmed
Hannis Distilling Company v. City of Baltimore	285 (1910)	White	none	none	C.C.D. Md.	dismissed
Fraenkl v. Cerecedo Hermanos	295 (1910)	White	none	none	D.P.R.	affirmed
Pendleton v. United States	305 (1910)	McKenna	none	none	Phil.	affirmed
Penman v. St. Paul Fire and Marine Insurance Company	311 (1910)	McKenna	none	none	3d Cir.	affirmed
Blake v. Openhym	322 (1910)	McKenna	none	none	8th Cir.	dismissed
Albright v. Sandoval I	331 (1910)	McKenna	none	none	Sup. Ct. Terr. N.M.	affirmed
Albright v. Sandoval II	342 (1910)	McKenna	none	none	Sup. Ct. Terr. N.M.	dismissed
W.J. Moxley Corp. v. Hertz	344 (1910)	McKenna	none	none	7th Cir.	certification
Laurel Hill Cemetery v. City and County of San Francisco	358 (1910)	Holmes	none	none	Cal.	affirmed
Hawaiian Trust Company, Ltd. v. Von Holt	367 (1910)	Holmes	none	none	Sup. Ct. Terr. Haw.	affirmed
United States v. Plowman	372 (1910)	Holmes	none	none	9th Cir.	reversed
Saxlehner v. Wagner	375 (1910)	Holmes	none	none	6th Cir.	affirmed
Harris v. First National Bank of Mt. Pleasant	382 (1910)	Day	none	none	E.D. Tex.	affirmed
Olmsted v. Olmsted	386 (1910)	Day	none	none	N.Y. Sup. Ct.	affirmed
Forbes v. State Council of Virginia, Junior Order of United American Mechanics of Virginia	396 (1910)	Day	none	none	Va.	dismissed
Southern Railroad Company v. Greene	400 (1910)	Day	none	none	Ala.	reversed
Louisville and Nashville Railroad Company v. Gaston	418 (1910)	Day	none	none	Ala.	reversed
Wright v. Georgia Railroad and Banking Company	420 (1910)	Lurton	none	none	C.C.N.D. Ga.	affirmed
Toxaway Hotel Company v. Smathers and Company	439 (1910)	Lurton	none	none	4th Cir.	certification
Friday v. Hall and Kaul Company	449 (1910)	Lurton	none	none	3d Cir.	reversed
Pickett v. United States	456 (1910)	Lurton	none	none	C.C.W.D. Okla.	affirmed
Haas v. Henkel	462 (1910)	Lurton	Brewer	none	C.C.S.D.N.Y.	affirmed
Peckham v. Henkel	483 (1910)	Lurton	Brewer	none	C.C.S.D.N.Y.	affirmed
Price v. Henkel	488 (1910)	Lurton	Brewer	none	C.C.S.D.N.Y.	affirmed
William Cramp and Sons Ship and Engine Building Company v. United States	494 (1910)	Brewer	none	none	Ct. Cl.	reversed
J.J. McCaskill Company v. United States	504 (1910)	McKenna	none	none	5th Cir.	affirmed
Parish of Orleans v. New York Life Insurance Company	517 (1910)	Holmes	none	none	C.C.E.D. La.	affirmed
Starkweather v. Jenner	524 (1910)	Lurton	none	none	D.C. Cir.	affirmed
Interstate Commerce Commission v. Delaware, Lackawanna and Western Railroad Company	531 (1910)	Holmes	none	none	C.C.S.D.N.Y.	affirmed
Interstate Commerce Commission v. Northern Pacific Railroad Company	538 (1910)	Holmes	none	none	C.C.D. Minn.	affirmed
Knapp v. Milwaukee Trust Company	545 (1910)	Day	none	none	7h Cir.	affirmed
Franklin v. United States	559 (1910)	Fuller	none	none	C.C.S.D.N.Y.	dismissed
Osborn v. Froyseth	571 (1910)	Lurton	none	none	Minn.	affirmed
Northern Pacific Railroad Company v. North Dakota ex rel. McCue	579 (1910)	Holmes	none	none	N.D.	affirmed
Williams v. First National Bank of Pauls Valley	582 (1910)	White	none	none	Okla.	affirmed
Garcia Maytin v. Vela	598 (1910)	Holmes	none	none	P.R.	multiple
Weir v. Rountree	607 (1910)	per curiam	none	none	8th Cir.	dismissed
David Kaufman and Sons Company v. Smith	610 (1910)	per curiam	none	none	C.C.D.N.J.	dismissed
Lewis v. United States	611 (1910)	per curiam	none	none	E.D. Mo.	dismissed
Mallers v. Commercial Loan and Trust Company	613 (1910)	per curiam	none	none	Ill.	dismissed

== See also ==
- Certificate of division
