= List of United States Supreme Court cases, volume 346 =

This is a list of all the United States Supreme Court cases from volume 346 of the United States Reports:

Case name	Citation	Date decided
United States v. Nugent	346 U.S. 1	1953
Dalehite v. United States	346 U.S. 15	1953
Automatic Canteen Co. v. FTC	346 U.S. 61	1953
FCC v. RCA	346 U.S. 86	1953
District of Columbia v. John R. Thompson Co.	346 U.S. 100	1953
SEC v. Ralston Purina Co.	346 U.S. 119	1953
N.Y.N.H. & H.R.R. Co. v. Nothnagle	346 U.S. 128	1953
Burns v. Wilson	346 U.S. 137	1953
Stein v. New York	346 U.S. 156	1953
Bridges v. United States	346 U.S. 209	1953
United States v. Grainger	346 U.S. 235	1953
Barrows v. Jackson	346 U.S. 249	1953
Shelton v. United States	346 U.S. 270	1953
Rosenberg v. Denno	346 U.S. 271	1953
Rosenberg v. United States I	346 U.S. 273	1953
Rosenberg v. United States II	346 U.S. 322	1953
Rosenberg v. United States III	346 U.S. 324	1953
Lemke v. United States	346 U.S. 325	1953
FTC v. Carter Products, Inc.	346 U.S. 327	1953
Voris v. Eikel	346 U.S. 328	1953
Lober v. United States	346 U.S. 335	1953
Olberding v. Ill. Cent. R.R. Co.	346 U.S. 338	1953
Atchison T. & S.F.R.R. Co. v. Pub. Util. Comm'n	346 U.S. 346	1953
Toolson v. New York Yankees	346 U.S. 356	1953
Avondale Marine Ways, Inc. v. Henderson	346 U.S. 366	1953
Arkansas v. Texas	346 U.S. 368	1953
United States v. Debrow	346 U.S. 374	1953
Bankers Life & Casualty Co. v. Holland	346 U.S. 379	1953
Dickinson v. United States	346 U.S. 389	1953
Pub. Util. Comm'n v. United Air Lines, Inc.	346 U.S. 402	1953
Pope & Talbot, Inc. v. Hawn	346 U.S. 406	1953
Wilko v. Swan	346 U.S. 427	1953
United States v. Five Gambling Devices	346 U.S. 441	1953
NLRB v. Elec. Workers	346 U.S. 464	1953
Howell Chevrolet Co. v. NLRB	346 U.S. 482	1953
Garner v. Teamsters	346 U.S. 485	1953
United States v. Morgan (1954)	346 U.S. 502	1954
Gen. Protective Comm. v. SEC	346 U.S. 521	1954
Theatre Enterprises, Inc. v. Paramount Film Distributing Corp.	346 U.S. 537	1954
Salsburg v. Maryland	346 U.S. 545	1954
Madruga v. Super. Ct.	346 U.S. 556	1954
United States v. Lindsay	346 U.S. 568	1954
Chi. R.I. & P.R.R. Co. v. Stude	346 U.S. 574	1954
Superior Films, Inc. v. Dept. of Ed.	346 U.S. 587	1954
