= List of Supreme Court cases involving Jehovah's Witnesses =

Numerous cases involving Jehovah's Witnesses have been heard by Supreme Courts throughout the world. The cases revolve around four main subjects: the practice of their religion, displays of patriotism, military service, and blood transfusions.

== Armenia ==
On July 11, 2011, the Grand Chamber issued a ruling for Bayatyan v. Armenia; Armenia was found to violate ECHR Article 9 (right to freedom of religion or belief) in the conviction of Mr. Vahan Bayatyan, a Jehovah's Witness and Armenian national, for draft evasion.

== Canada ==
The Supreme Court of Canada has made several important decisions concerning Jehovah's Witnesses. These include laws that affected the activities of Jehovah's Witnesses in the 1950s and more recent cases dealing with whether Witness parents had the right to decide what medical treatment was in the best interest of their children based on their faith.

On November 15, 1955 (Chaput v Romain [1955] S.C.R. 834), a Jehovah's Witness member successfully brought action against police officers for disrupting a religious meeting and seizing articles. The entry and the seizure were made without a warrant. No charge was laid against any of the participants including the appellant and the items seized were not returned.

On January 27, 1959 (Roncarelli v Duplessis [1959] S.C.R. 121), the Supreme Court of Canada found that Maurice Duplessis, the premier of Quebec, wrongfully caused the revocation of Frank Roncarelli's liquor license. Roncarelli, a Jehovah's Witness, was a restaurant owner in Montreal who offered bail security for members of his faith arrested by the Municipality. The Witnesses were frequently arrested for distributing magazines without the necessary permits under a city by-law. The Chief Prosecutor of the city, Oscar Gagnon, overwhelmed by the number of Witnesses being arrested and then released as a result of Roncarelli's intervention, contacted the Premier who spoke to Edouard Archambault, Chairman of the Quebec Liquor Commission. Extensive testimony showed the government actors believed Roncarelli was disrupting the court system, causing civil disorder, and was therefore not entitled to the liquor license.

On June 26, 2009, the Supreme Court of Canada issued a 6–1 decision saying courts must take into account the maturity and decision-making capacity of minors before ruling on enforced medical treatment. The case involved a young Jehovah's Witness, identified only as A.C., who was admitted to a hospital in Winnipeg with internal bleeding as a complication of Crohn's disease. Doctors sought a blood transfusion, but A.C. and her parents refused on religious grounds; child welfare officials moved to take her into care and a court ordered that she be given the transfusion. The judge said he was satisfied she was competent, but since she was under 16 the judge felt that her competence was immaterial to existing law. Justice Rosalie Abella wrote for the majority, "A young person is entitled to a degree of decisional autonomy commensurate with his or her maturity."

On May 31, 2018, the Supreme Court of Canada issued a 9–0 decision saying courts have no jurisdiction to review membership questions of a religious organization. "In the end, religious groups are free to determine their membership and rules; courts will not intervene in such matters save where it is necessary to resolve an underlying legal dispute," Justice Malcolm Rowe wrote in the decision.

== France ==
On October 5, 2004, the Court of Cassation—the highest court in France for cases outside of administrative law—rejected the Witnesses' recourse against taxation at 60% of the value of some of their contributions, which the fiscal services assimilated to a legal category of donations close to that of inheritance and subject to the same taxes between non-parents. The court ruled that the tax administration could legally tax the corporation used by Jehovah's Witnesses if they received donations in the form of dons gratuits and they were not recognized as associations cultuelles.

On June 30, 2011, the European Court of Human Rights found France to be guilty of violation of ECHR Article 9 (religious freedom) in regard to the 60% tax levied on all donations received from 1993 to 1996. The Court found that the tax assessment represented a cut in the association's operating resources sufficient to interfere with the free exercise of its members' religion in practical terms. By 2011, the Government of France sought the Association to pay a sum of 58 million Euros. A representative of Jehovah's Witnesses in France stated that "no other major religion in France was subjected to this tax" and that "the Court saw that this was not a legitimate effort to collect revenue, but rather an attempt to use taxation as a means of restricting the worship of Jehovah's Witnesses."

== Germany ==
In December 2000, the Federal Constitutional Court ruled that Jehovah's Witnesses did not have to pass a test of "loyalty to the state".

The Federal Constitutional Court held that transfusing blood to an unconscious Jehovah's Witness violated the person's will, but did not constitute a battery.

== India ==
In 1985, three students of NSS High School at Kidangoor in the Kottayam district of Kerala were expelled for not singing the national anthem of India. The children were from a Jehovah's Witness family. Their father, V. J. Emmanuel, approached the Kerala High Court challenging the school's decision, arguing that their religion prohibits singing the anthem. The court ruled in favor of the school's decision. Subsequently, Emmanuel filed a special leave petition in the Supreme Court of India. The Supreme Court overturned the High Court's decision and backed the appellant, ruling that Jehovah's Witness children could not be compelled to sing the national anthem in schools.

== Japan ==
In 1998, The Watchtower reported that "On March 8, 1996, the Supreme Court of Japan [ruled that] ... Kobe Municipal Industrial Technical College violated the law by expelling Kunihito Kobayashi for his refusal to participate in martial arts training."

According to Awake!, "Misae Takeda, a Jehovah's Witness, was given [a] blood transfusion in 1992, while still under sedation following surgery to remove a malignant tumor of the liver." On February 29, 2000, "the four judges of the Supreme Court unanimously decided that doctors were at fault because they failed to explain that they might give her a blood transfusion if deemed necessary during the operation, thus depriving her of the right to decide whether to accept the operation or not."

== Norway ==
In Norway, Valgerd Svarstad Haugland, the county governor of Oslo and Viken, revoked the funding of Jehovah's Witnesses in Oslo and Viken in 2022. In 2023, Jehovah's Witnesses were deregistered as a religious community in Norway due to their practice of shunning, resulting in the loss of state grants.

A series of appeals followed. On April 29, 2026, the Supreme Court of Norway ruled that the deregistration and suspension of state grants was unlawful. The court stated that the human rights of adult or minor ex-members are not violated when Jehovah's Witnesses shun them, citing a lack of evidence and the practice of shunning in other religions. The final ruling was announced on April 30.

== Philippines ==
In 1993, the Supreme Court of the Philippines held that exemption may be accorded to Jehovah's Witnesses concerning the observance of the flag ceremony out of respect for their religious beliefs.

In 1995 and 1996, the Supreme Court of the Philippines granted an exception to laws regarding marriage to a practicing Jehovah's Witness because enforcement of those laws would have inhibited the free exercise of religious beliefs.

== Russia ==
After the fall of the communist bloc of nations in Eastern Europe and Asia, Jehovah's Witnesses were allowed to worship freely in those nations for the first time since World War II. However, after the 1990s, several court cases in the Moscow courts banned Jehovah's Witnesses in the Moscow district. Jehovah's Witnesses won a favorable verdict in the European Court of Human Rights on June 10, 2010, in the case of Jehovah's Witnesses of Moscow v. Russia.

On April 20, 2017, the Supreme Court of the Russian Federation ruled in favor of a claim from the Ministry of Justice to liquidate the Administrative Center of Jehovah's Witnesses in Russia. Jehovah's Witnesses won a consequent case in the European Court of Human Rights on June 7, 2022, in the case Taganrog LRO and Others v. Russia.

== United States ==
In the United States, numerous cases involving Jehovah's Witnesses are now landmark decisions of First Amendment law. In all, Jehovah's Witnesses brought 23 separate First Amendment actions before the U.S. Supreme Court between 1938 and 1946. Supreme Court Justice Harlan Fiske Stone once quipped, "I think the Jehovah's Witnesses ought to have an endowment in view of the aid which they give in solving the legal problems of civil liberties."

The most important U.S. Supreme Court legal victory won by the Witnesses was in the case West Virginia State Board of Education vs. Barnette (1943), in which the court ruled that school children could not be forced to pledge allegiance to or salute the U.S. flag. The Barnette decision overturned an earlier case, Minersville School District v. Gobitis (1940), in which the court had held that Witnesses could be forced against their will to pay homage to the flag.

The fighting words doctrine was established by Chaplinsky v. New Hampshire (1942). In that case, Walter Chaplinsky, a Jehovah's Witness, had reportedly told a New Hampshire town marshal who was attempting to prevent him from preaching, "You are a God-damned racketeer" and "a damned fascist" and was arrested. Chaplinsky admitted using the words, except for "God". The court upheld the arrest, thus establishing that "insulting or 'fighting words', those that by their very utterance inflict injury or tend to incite an immediate breach of the peace" are among the "well-defined and narrowly limited classes of speech [which] the prevention and punishment of...have never been thought to raise any constitutional problem."

On January 15, 1951, the U.S. Supreme Court reversed the decision of a lower court in convicting two Jehovah's Witnesses lecturers of disorderly conduct for conducting public speeches in a city park of Harford County in Maryland without permits. The Supreme Court stated that the initial conviction was based on the lack of permits that were unconstitutionally denied, therefore convictions were not able to stand. The initial conviction was declined for review by the Maryland Court of Appeals under its normal appellate power, and further declined to take the case on certiorari, stating that the issues were not "matters of public interest" which made it desirable to review. Chief Justice Fred Vinson delivered the opinion of the Court, stating that "rarely has any case been before this Court which shows so clearly an unwarranted discrimination in a refusal to issue such a license. The City Council indeed held a hearing at which it considered the application. But we have searched the record in vain to discover any valid basis for the refusal."

On March 9, 1953, the U.S. Supreme Court overturned and remanded the Supreme Court of Rhode Island's affirmation of the conviction of a Jehovah's Witnesses member for holding a religious meeting in a city park of Pawtucket. The opinion of the court was that the religious service of Jehovah's Witnesses had been treated differently from the religious services of other denominations. The court stated that the city had not prohibited church services in the park, as Catholics and Protestants could conduct services there without violating the ordinance.

In 2002, Jehovah's Witnesses refused to get government permits to preach door-to-door in Stratton, Ohio. The case was heard in the U.S. Supreme Court (Watchtower Society v. Village of Stratton — 536 U.S. 150 (2002)). The Court ruled in favor of Jehovah's Witnesses, holding that making it a misdemeanor to engage in door-to-door advocacy without first registering with the mayor and receiving a permit violates the First Amendment as it applies to religious proselytizing, anonymous political speech, and the distribution of handbills.

== See also ==
- Jehovah's Witnesses and governments
