= Meagan Flynn =

American judge (born 1967)

Chief Justice of the Oregon Supreme Court
- Incumbent
- Assumed office January 1, 2023
- Preceded by: Martha Lee Walters

Justice of the Oregon Supreme Court
- Incumbent
- Assumed office April 1, 2017
- Appointed by: Kate Brown
- Preceded by: Richard C. Baldwin

Personal details
- Born: July 28, 1967 (age 57)
- Education: Willamette University (BA); Gonzaga University (JD)

Meagan Aileen Flynn (born July 28, 1967) is an American judge who is the chief justice of the Oregon Supreme Court. She previously served as a judge on the Oregon Court of Appeals from 2014 to 2017. Flynn was appointed to the state’s supreme court by the Governor Kate Brown in March 2017.

== Education ==
Flynn graduated high school from the Holy Names Academy in Seattle in 1985. She completed a bachelor's degree at Willamette University in 1989, and a J.D. degree at Gonzaga University School of Law in 1992. Flynn clerked for the Oregon Court of Appeals in 1992–1994, for judges Robert D. Durham and Rick Haselton.

== Legal career ==
Flynn worked as an attorney in private practice in Portland, Oregon, specializing in torts, employment, and insurance law. She was an associate at Pozzi Wilson Atchison from 1994 to 1999, and was a partner at Preston Bunnell & Flynn from 1999 to 2014.

Flynn specialized in appellate advocacy before Oregon’s appellate courts and the U.S. Court of Appeals for the Ninth Circuit. She also served on the executive committee of the Oregon Law Institute and chaired the Oregon State Bar Appellate Practice Section.

== Judicial career ==
Governor John Kitzhaber announced the appointment of Flynn as a state judge on the Oregon Court of Appeals, Position 7, on September 25, 2014. She succeeded Robert Wollheim, who retired from the court on October 31, 2014. Flynn was re-elected to the appeals court in November 2016.

Governor Kate Brown appointed Flynn to the Oregon Supreme Court in 2017, to replace justice Richard C. Baldwin, who retired on March 31, 2017. Flynn became chief justice on December 31, 2022, after Martha Lee Walters retired.

Legal offices
Preceded by Richard C. Baldwin	Justice of the Oregon Supreme Court; 2017–present	Incumbent
Preceded by Martha Lee Walters	Chief Justice of the Oregon Supreme Court; 2023–present	Incumbent
