= UACV =

UACV may stand for:

- Unmanned aerial combat vehicle: see Unmanned combat aerial vehicle
- Unpasteurized apple cider vinegar or unfiltered apple cider vinegar: see Apple cider vinegar
