= List of United States Supreme Court cases, volume 265 =

Supreme Court of the United States
- Interactive map of Supreme Court of the United States
- 38°53′26″N 77°00′16″W
- Established: March 4, 1789; 236 years ago
- Location: Washington, D.C.
- Coordinates: 38°53′26″N 77°00′16″W
- Composition method: Presidential nomination with Senate confirmation
- Authorised by: Constitution of the United States, Art. III, § 1
- Judge term length: life tenure, subject to impeachment and removal
- Number of positions: 9 (by statute)
- Website: supremecourt.gov

This is a list of cases reported in volume 265 of United States Reports, decided by the Supreme Court of the United States in 1924.

== Justices of the Supreme Court at the time of volume 265 U.S. ==
The Supreme Court is established by Article III, Section 1 of the Constitution of the United States, which says: "The judicial Power of the United States, shall be vested in one supreme Court . . .". The size of the Court is not specified; the Constitution leaves it to Congress to set the number of justices. Under the Judiciary Act of 1789 Congress originally fixed the number of justices at six (one chief justice and five associate justices). Since 1789 Congress has varied the size of the Court from six to seven, nine, ten, and back to nine justices (always including one chief justice).

When the cases in volume 265 were decided the Court comprised the following nine members:

Portrait	Justice	Office	Home State	Succeeded	Date confirmed by the Senate (Vote)	Tenure on Supreme Court
	William Howard Taft	Chief Justice	Connecticut	Edward Douglass White	June 30, 1921 (Acclamation)	July 11, 1921 – February 3, 1930 (Retired)
	Joseph McKenna	Associate Justice	California	Stephen Johnson Field	January 21, 1898 (Acclamation)	January 26, 1898 – January 5, 1925 (Retired)
	Oliver Wendell Holmes Jr.	Associate Justice	Massachusetts	Horace Gray	December 4, 1902 (Acclamation)	December 8, 1902 – January 12, 1932 (Retired)
	Willis Van Devanter	Associate Justice	Wyoming	Edward Douglass White (as Associate Justice)	December 15, 1910 (Acclamation)	January 3, 1911 – June 2, 1937 (Retired)
	James Clark McReynolds	Associate Justice	Tennessee	Horace Harmon Lurton	August 29, 1914 (44–6)	October 12, 1914 – January 31, 1941 (Retired)
	Louis Brandeis	Associate Justice	Massachusetts	Joseph Rucker Lamar	June 1, 1916 (47–22)	June 5, 1916 – February 13, 1939 (Retired)
	George Sutherland	Associate Justice	Utah	John Hessin Clarke	September 5, 1922 (Acclamation)	October 2, 1922 – January 17, 1938 (Retired)
	Pierce Butler	Associate Justice	Minnesota	William R. Day	December 21, 1922 (61–8)	January 2, 1923 – November 16, 1939 (Died)
	Edward Terry Sanford	Associate Justice	Tennessee	Mahlon Pitney	January 29, 1923 (Acclamation)	February 19, 1923 – March 8, 1930 (Died)

== Notable case in volume 265 U.S. ==
=== Hester v. United States ===
In Hester v. United States, 265 U.S. 57 (1924), the Supreme Court established the open-fields doctrine. The Court held that "the special protection accorded by the Fourth Amendment to the people in their 'persons, houses, papers and effects', is not extended to the open fields." This rule of criminal procedure, is the legal doctrine that a "warrantless search of the area outside a property owner's curtilage" does not violate the Fourth Amendment. However, "unless there is some other legal basis for the search," such a search "must exclude the home and any adjoining land (such as a yard) that is within an enclosure or otherwise protected from public scrutiny."

== Citation style ==
Under the Judiciary Act of 1789 the federal court structure at the time comprised District Courts, which had general trial jurisdiction; Circuit Courts, which had mixed trial and appellate (from the US District Courts) jurisdiction; and the United States Supreme Court, which had appellate jurisdiction over the federal District and Circuit courts—and for certain issues over state courts. The Supreme Court also had limited original jurisdiction (i.e., in which cases could be filed directly with the Supreme Court without first having been heard by a lower federal or state court). There were one or more federal District Courts and/or Circuit Courts in each state, territory, or other geographical region.

The Judiciary Act of 1891 created the United States Courts of Appeals and reassigned the jurisdiction of most routine appeals from the district and circuit courts to these appellate courts. The Act created nine new courts that were originally known as the "United States Circuit Courts of Appeals." The new courts had jurisdiction over most appeals of lower court decisions. The Supreme Court could review either legal issues that a court of appeals certified or decisions of court of appeals by writ of certiorari. On January 1, 1912, the effective date of the Judicial Code of 1911, the old Circuit Courts were abolished, with their remaining trial court jurisdiction transferred to the U.S. District Courts.

Bluebook citation style is used for case names, citations, and jurisdictions.

- "# Cir." = United States Court of Appeals
  - e.g., "3d Cir." = United States Court of Appeals for the Third Circuit
- "D." = United States District Court for the District of . . .
  - e.g.,"D. Mass." = United States District Court for the District of Massachusetts
- "E." = Eastern; "M." = Middle; "N." = Northern; "S." = Southern; "W." = Western
  - e.g.,"M.D. Ala." = United States District Court for the Middle District of Alabama
- "Ct. Cl." = United States Court of Claims
- The abbreviation of a state's name alone indicates the highest appellate court in that state's judiciary at the time.
  - e.g.,"Pa." = Supreme Court of Pennsylvania
  - e.g.,"Me." = Supreme Judicial Court of Maine

== List of cases in volume 265 U.S. ==
Case Name	Page and year	Opinion of the Court	Concurring opinion(s)	Dissenting opinion(s)	Lower Court	Disposition
Cunningham v. Brown	1 (1924)	Taft	none	none	1st Cir.	reversed
Chicago, Burlington and Quincy Railroad Company v. Osborne	14 (1924)	Holmes	none	none	D. Neb.	reversed
Missouri ex rel. Burnes National Bank of St. Joseph v. Duncan	17 (1924)	Holmes	none	Sutherland	Mo.	reversed
Supreme Lodge, Knights of Pythias v. Meyer	30 (1924)	Sutherland	none	McReynolds	Neb.	affirmed
New York Central Railroad Company v. United States	41 (1924)	Butler	none	none	3d Cir.	certification
Cook v. Tait	47 (1924)	McKenna	none	none	D. Md.	affirmed
Hester v. United States	57 (1924)	Holmes	none	none	W.D.S.C.	affirmed
Louisville and Nashville Railroad Company v. Central Iron and Coal Company	59 (1924)	Brandeis	none	none	5th Cir.	affirmed
Norfolk and Western Railway Company v. Public Service Commission of West Virginia	70 (1924)	Butler	none	none	W. Va.	affirmed
Oklahoma v. Texas I	76 (1924)	per curiam	none	none	original	continued
Newton v. Consolidated Gas Company of New York	78 (1924)	Taft	none	none	S.D.N.Y.	affirmed
Ex parte Skinner and Eddy Corporation	86 (1924)	Taft	none	none	Ct. Cl.	mandamus granted
New York, Philadelphia and Norfolk Telegraph Company v. Dolan	96 (1924)	Holmes	none	none	Del.	affirmed
Missouri Pacific Railroad Company v. Prude	99 (1924)	McReynolds	none	none	Ark.	reversed
Atchison, Topeka and Santa Fe Railway Company v. Wells	101 (1924)	Brandeis	none	none	5th Cir.	reversed
Transportes Maritimos do Estado v. Almeida	104 (1924)	Brandeis	none	none	S.D.N.Y.	transfer to 2d Cir.
Brooks-Scanlon Corporation v. United States	106 (1924)	Butler	none	McReynolds	Ct. Cl.	reversed
Hecht v. Malley	144 (1924)	Sanford	none	none	1st Cir.	multiple
United States v. Ferris	165 (1924)	Taft	none	none	Ct. Cl.	reversed
United States ex rel. Baldwin Company v. Robertson	168 (1924)	Taft	none	none	D.C. Cir.	reversed
Hammerschmidt v. United States	182 (1924)	Taft	none	none	6th Cir.	reversed
United States v. Supplee-Biddle Hardware Company	189 (1924)	Taft	none	none	Ct. Cl.	affirmed
Pacific Telephone and Telegraph Company v. Kuykendall	196 (1924)	Taft	none	none	W.D. Wash.	reversed
Home Telephone and Telegraph Company of Spokane v. Kuykendall	206 (1924)	Taft	none	none	W.D. Wash.	reversed
Illinois Central Railroad Company v. United States	209 (1924)	McKenna	none	none	Ct. Cl.	affirmed
City of Opelika v. Opelika Sewer Company	215 (1924)	Holmes	none	none	M.D. Ala.	reversed
Davis v. Corona Coal Company	219 (1924)	Holmes	none	none	La. Ct. App.	reversed
Salinger v. Loisel	224 (1924)	VanDevanter	none	none	E.D. La.	multiple
Wong Doo v. United States	239 (1924)	VanDevanter	none	none	6th Cir.	affirmed
Weiss v. Stearn	242 (1924)	McReynolds	none	none	6th Cir.	affirmed
Hixon v. Oakes	254 (1924)	McReynolds	none	none	Cal. Ct. App.	dismissed
Davis v. Donovan	257 (1924)	McReynolds	none	none	2d Cir.	reversed
Adams Express Company v. Darden	265 (1924)	Brandeis	none	none	6th Cir.	affirmed
Nassau Smelting and Refining Works, Ltd. v. Brightwood Bronze Foundry Company	269 (1924)	Brandeis	none	none	1st Cir.	reversed
United States v. Abilene and Southern Railway Company	274 (1924)	Brandeis	none	none	D. Kan.	affirmed
United States ex rel. Chicago, New York & Boston Refrigerator Company v. Interstate Commerce Commission	292 (1924)	Sutherland	none	none	D.C. Cir.	affirmed
Missouri ex rel. Barrett v. Kansas Natural Gas Company	298 (1924)	Sutherland	none	none	W.D. Mo.	multiple
Commissioner of Immigration v. Gottlieb	310 (1924)	Sutherland	none	none	2d Cir.	reversed
Lynch v. Tilden Produce Company	315 (1924)	Butler	none	none	8th Cir.	affirmed
Swendig v. Washington Water Power Company	322 (1924)	Butler	none	none	9th Cir.	affirmed
Asakura v. City of Seattle	332 (1924)	Butler	none	none	Wash.	reversed
Kennedy v. United States	344 (1924)	Butler	none	none	8th Cir.	certification
Lucking v. Detroit and Cleveland Navigation Company	346 (1924)	Butler	none	none	6th Cir.	affirmed
St. Cloud Public Service Company v. City of St. Cloud	352 (1924)	Sanford	none	none	D. Minn.	affirmed
Liberty National Bank of Roanoke v. Bear	365 (1924)	Sanford	none	none	4th Cir.	reversed
R.E. Sheehan Company v. Shuler	371 (1924)	Sanford	none	none	N.Y.	affirmed
New York State Railways v. Shuler	379 (1924)	Sanford	none	none	N.Y.	affirmed
Hetrick v. Village of Lindsey	384 (1924)	Taft	none	none	Ohio	affirmed
Gnerich v. Rutter	388 (1924)	VanDevanter	none	none	9th Cir.	reversed
Goto v. Lane	393 (1924)	VanDevanter	none	none	D. Haw.	affirmed
Pacific Gas and Electric Company Company v. City of San Francisco	403 (1924)	McReynolds	none	Brandeis	N.D. Cal.	reversed
United States v. American Railway Express Company	425 (1924)	Brandeis	none	none	N.D. Ga.	reversed
United States v. Ninety-Five Barrels Alleged Apple Cider Vinegar	438 (1924)	Butler	none	none	6th Cir.	reversed
Thomson Spot Welder Company v. Ford Motor Company	445 (1924)	Sanford	none	none	6th Cir.	affirmed
United States & Cuban Allied Works Engineering Corporation v. Lloyds	454 (1924)	Taft	none	none	2d Cir.	remanded
United Leather Workers International Union, Local Lodge or Union No. 66 v. Herkert and Meisel Trunk Company	457 (1924)	Taft	none	none	8th Cir.	reversed
United States v. Title Insurance and Trust Company	472 (1924)	VanDevanter	none	none	9th Cir.	affirmed
Walton v. Oklahoma House of Representatives	487 (1924)	VanDevanter	none	none	W.D. Okla.	affirmed
Oklahoma v. Texas II	490 (1924)	VanDevanter	none	none	original	injunction granted
Oklahoma v. Texas III	493 (1924)	VanDevanter	none	none	original	boundary set
Oklahoma v. Texas IV	505 (1924)	VanDevanter	none	none	original	multiple
Idaho Irrigation Company, Ltd. v. Gooding	518 (1924)	Sutherland	none	none	9th Cir.	multiple
William R. Warner and Company v. Eli Lilly and Company	526 (1924)	Sutherland	none	none	3d Cir.	reversed
United States v. New River Company	533 (1924)	Butler	none	McKenna	S.D.W. Va.	reversed
Everard's Breweries v. Day	545 (1924)	Sanford	none	none	S.D.N.Y.	affirmed
