= United States v. Hatch =

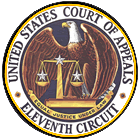
- Court: United States Court of Appeals for the Eleventh Circuit
- Full case name: United States v. Joe Hatch a/k/a "Little Joe"
- Decided: May 24, 1991
- Citation: 931 F.2d 1478

Case history
- Subsequent history: Cert. denied, 502 U.S. 883 (1991)

Court membership
- Judges sitting: Gerald Bard Tjoflat, R. Lanier Anderson III, Thomas Alonzo Clark

Case opinions
- Majority: Clark, joined by a unanimous court

Laws applied
- U.S. Const. amend. IV

Keywords
- Open-fields doctrine

United States v. Hatch, 931 F.2d 1478 (11th Cir. 1991), cert. denied, 502 U.S. 883 (1991) is a United States Court of Appeals for the Eleventh Circuit court decision relating to the open fields doctrine limiting the scope of the Fourth Amendment of the U.S. Constitution.

The defendant challenged a conviction for drug related offenses for growing marijuana on the basis that the area searched by the police was within the "curtilage" of his home in Palm Beach County, Florida. He specifically argued that because the fence surrounding his home was unfinished in the direction where the drugs were discovered that the area was still within the "curtilage." The Court of Appeals did not agree, stating:

[T]he evidence that the curtilage that defines the property that was in question here is enclosed in the fencing around the home and taxidermist building, even if the fence may not be complete on the north, and perhaps east sides of the property. It is true in a narrow definition of the term perimeter that means all the way around. But it seems to me it isn't necessary that the fence be without any kind of breech [sic] in order for the curtilage to be defined for the purpose that we are talking about here. I think we have to be practical about the thing, and the areas where the fence may not be complete around his property is really not an area that is in question in connection with the investigation that was made by these officers.

Also central to the court's findings was the presence of a barn, pig pens and several other obstacles found in the thirty yards (27 m) between the house and the drug crop.
