= Richard C. Baldwin =

American judge (born 1947)

Justice of the Oregon Supreme Court
- In office January 2013 – March 2017
- Preceded by: Robert D. Durham
- Succeeded by: Meagan Flynn

Personal details
- Born: Richard Clinton Baldwin; March 24, 1947 (age 79) San Jose, California
- Spouse: Teresa
- Children: 2
- Education: San Jose State University; Lewis & Clark Law School
- Occupation: Judge

Richard C. Baldwin (born March 24, 1947) is a former American judge, who served as a justice of the Oregon Supreme Court from 2013 to 2017. A native of California, he was a legal aide attorney prior to joining the Oregon Supreme Court and returned to private practice after retirement from the court.

== Early life and education ==
Baldwin was born in San Jose, California. He completed a Bachelor of Arts degree at San Jose State College (now San Jose State University) in 1970 and then a Juris Doctor at Lewis & Clark Law School in Portland, Oregon, in 1975. Baldwin clerked for Robert Foley of the Oregon Court of Appeals in 1975-1976 before he passed the Oregon Bar in 1977.

== Legal career ==
Baldwin worked as a staff attorney for Oregon Legal Aid in Multnomah County in 1976 to 1980, and was in private practice in 1981-1991. He returned to Multnomah County Legal Aid as Litigation Director from 1991 to 1995. Baldwin was Executive Director of the Oregon Law Center, a non-profit organization, in 1996-2000, before being appointed as a state judge.

== Judicial career ==
Baldwin served as an Oregon Circuit Courts Judge in Multnomah County, Oregon from 2001 to 2012. He was appointed by the Governor of Oregon, John Kitzhaber, in 2001, and was re-elected in 2002 and 2008. As a state judge, he helped create the Multnomah County Mental Health Court and the Oregon Coalition Against Domestic Violence.

Baldwin was elected to the Oregon Supreme Court in November 2012, defeating Nena Cook, to replace retiring justice Robert D. Durham. Baldwin retired from the court in March 2017, and was replaced by justice Meagan Flynn, who was appointed by Governor Kate Brown. After retiring from the bench, he returned to private practice, working as a mediator and private arbitrator.

== Electoral history ==
2012 Judge of the Oregon Supreme Court, Position 3
Party	Candidate	Votes	%
Nonpartisan	Richard C Baldwin	641,605	51.0
Nonpartisan	Nena Cook	606,689	48.2
Write-in		9,148	0.7
Total votes		1,257,442	100%

Legal offices
Preceded by Robert D. Durham	Justice of the Oregon Supreme Court; 2013–2017	Succeeded by Meagan Flynn
