= List of United States Supreme Court cases, volume 154 =

Supreme Court of the United States
- Interactive map of Supreme Court of the United States
- 38°53′26″N 77°00′16″W
- Established: March 4, 1789; 236 years ago
- Location: Washington, D.C.
- Coordinates: 38°53′26″N 77°00′16″W
- Composition method: Presidential nomination with Senate confirmation
- Authorised by: Constitution of the United States, Art. III, § 1
- Judge term length: life tenure, subject to impeachment and removal
- Number of positions: 9 (by statute)
- Website: supremecourt.gov

This is a list of cases reported in volume 154 of United States Reports, decided by the Supreme Court of the United States in 1894; atypically, more than two hundred other Supreme Court opinions from earlier years (1852–1883) also appear within the volume.

== Justices of the Supreme Court at the time of volume 154 U.S. ==
The Supreme Court is established by Article III, Section 1 of the Constitution of the United States, which says: "The judicial Power of the United States, shall be vested in one supreme Court . . .". The size of the Court is not specified; the Constitution leaves it to Congress to set the number of justices. Under the Judiciary Act of 1789 Congress originally fixed the number of justices at six (one chief justice and five associate justices). Since 1789 Congress has varied the size of the Court from six to seven, nine, ten, and back to nine justices (always including one chief justice).

The opinions in cases from 1852 to 1883 in volume 154 were written by various current and former justices. When the cases, from 1894, in the volume were decided the Court comprised the following nine members:

Portrait	Justice	Office	Home State	Succeeded	Date confirmed by the Senate (Vote)	Tenure on Supreme Court
	Melville Fuller	Chief Justice	Illinois	Morrison Waite	July 20, 1888 (41–20)	October 8, 1888 – July 4, 1910 (Died)
	Stephen Johnson Field	Associate Justice	California	newly created seat	March 10, 1863 (Acclamation)	May 10, 1863 – December 1, 1897 (Retired)
	John Marshall Harlan	Associate Justice	Kentucky	David Davis	November 29, 1877 (Acclamation)	December 10, 1877 – October 14, 1911 (Died)
	Horace Gray	Associate Justice	Massachusetts	Nathan Clifford	December 20, 1881 (51–5)	January 9, 1882 – September 15, 1902 (Died)
	David Josiah Brewer	Associate Justice	Kansas	Stanley Matthews	December 18, 1889 (53–11)	January 6, 1890 – March 28, 1910 (Died)
	Henry Billings Brown	Associate Justice	Michigan	Samuel Freeman Miller	December 29, 1890 (Acclamation)	January 5, 1891 – May 28, 1906 (Retired)
	George Shiras Jr.	Associate Justice	Pennsylvania	Joseph P. Bradley	July 26, 1892 (Acclamation)	October 10, 1892 – February 23, 1903 (Retired)
	Howell Edmunds Jackson	Associate Justice	Tennessee	Lucius Quintus Cincinnatus Lamar	February 18, 1893 (Acclamation)	March 4, 1893 – August 8, 1895 (Died)
	Edward Douglass White	Associate Justice	Louisiana	Samuel Blatchford	February 19, 1894 (Acclamation)	March 12, 1894 – December 18, 1910 (Continued as chief justice)

== Citation style ==
Under the Judiciary Act of 1789 the federal court structure at the time comprised District Courts, which had general trial jurisdiction; Circuit Courts, which had mixed trial and appellate (from the US District Courts) jurisdiction; and the United States Supreme Court, which had appellate jurisdiction over the federal District and Circuit courts—and for certain issues over state courts. The Supreme Court also had limited original jurisdiction (i.e., in which cases could be filed directly with the Supreme Court without first having been heard by a lower federal or state court). There were one or more federal District Courts and/or Circuit Courts in each state, territory, or other geographical region.

The Judiciary Act of 1891 created the United States Courts of Appeals and reassigned the jurisdiction of most routine appeals from the district and circuit courts to these appellate courts. The Act created nine new courts that were originally known as the "United States Circuit Courts of Appeals." The new courts had jurisdiction over most appeals of lower court decisions. The Supreme Court could review either legal issues that a court of appeals certified or decisions of court of appeals by writ of certiorari.

Bluebook citation style is used for case names, citations, and jurisdictions.

- "# Cir." = United States Court of Appeals
  - e.g., "3d Cir." = United States Court of Appeals for the Third Circuit
- "C.C.D." = United States Circuit Court for the District of . . .
  - e.g.,"C.C.D.N.J." = United States Circuit Court for the District of New Jersey
- "D." = United States District Court for the District of . . .
  - e.g.,"D. Mass." = United States District Court for the District of Massachusetts
- "E." = Eastern; "M." = Middle; "N." = Northern; "S." = Southern; "W." = Western
  - e.g.,"C.C.S.D.N.Y." = United States Circuit Court for the Southern District of New York
  - e.g.,"M.D. Ala." = United States District Court for the Middle District of Alabama
- "Ct. Cl." = United States Court of Claims
- The abbreviation of a state's name alone indicates the highest appellate court in that state's judiciary at the time.
  - e.g.,"Pa." = Supreme Court of Pennsylvania
  - e.g.,"Me." = Supreme Judicial Court of Maine

== List of cases in volume 154 U.S. decided in 1894 ==
Case Name	Page and year	Opinion of the Court	Concurring opinion(s)	Dissenting opinion(s)	Lower Court	Disposition
Primrose v. Western Union Telegraph Company	1 (1894)	Gray	none	none	C.C.E.D. Pa.	affirmed
Scott v. McNeal	34 (1894)	Gray	none	none	Wash.	reversed
Constable v. National Steamship Company	51 (1894)	Brown	none	Jackson	C.C.S.D.N.Y.	affirmed
Dunham v. Dennison Manufacturing Company	103 (1894)	Gray	none	none	C.C.S.D.N.Y.	affirmed
Morrison v. Watson	111 (1894)	Gray	none	none	N.C.	dismissed
In re Lockwood	116 (1894)	Fuller	none	none	Va.	mandamus denied
The Haytian Republic	118 (1894)	White	none	none	9th Cir.	reversed
Northern Pacific Railroad Company v. Patterson	130 (1894)	Fuller	none	none	Mont.	dismissed
St. Clair v. United States	134 (1894)	Harlan	none	none	C.C.N.D. Cal.	affirmed
Missouri Pacific Railroad Company v. McFadden	155 (1894)	White	none	none	C.C.N.D. Tex.	reversed
Prentice v. Northern Pacific Railroad Company	163 (1894)	Harlan	none	none	C.C.D. Minn.	affirmed
Balkam v. Woodstock Iron Company	177 (1894)	White	none	none	C.C.N.D. Ala.	affirmed
Northern Pacific Railroad Company v. Babcock	190 (1894)	White	none	none	C.C.D. Minn.	affirmed
Covington and Cincinnati Bridge Company v. Kentucky	204 (1894)	Brown	none	none	Ky.	reversed
Covington and Cincinnati Elevated Railroad and Transfer and Bridge Company v. Kentucky	224 (1894)	Brown	none	none	Ky.	reversed
United States v. Illinois Central Railroad Company	225 (1894)	Field	none	Brewer	C.C.N.D. Ill.	affirmed
Riggles v. Erney	244 (1894)	Brown	none	Brewer	Sup. Ct. D.C.	reversed
Moran v. Sturges	256 (1894)	Fuller	none	Brewer	N.Y. Sup. Ct.	reversed
Barden v. Northern Pacific Railroad Company	288 (1894)	Field	none	Brewer	C.C.D. Mont.	reversed
Northern Pacific Railroad Company v. Hambly	349 (1894)	Brown	none	none	C.C.D.N.D.	certification
Reagan v. Farmers' Loan and Trust Company I	362 (1894)	Brewer	none	none	C.C.W.D. Tex.	multiple
Reagan v. Mercantile Trust Company I	413 (1894)	Brewer	none	none	C.C.W.D. Tex.	multiple
Reagan v. Mercantile Trust Company II	418 (1894)	Brewer	none	none	C.C.W.D. Tex.	multiple
Reagan v. Farmers' Loan and Trust Company II	420 (1894)	Brewer	none	none	C.C.W.D. Tex.	multiple
Pittsburgh, Cincinnati, Chicago and St. Louis Railroad Company v. Backus	421 (1894)	Brewer	none	Harlan	Ind.	affirmed
Cleveland, Cincinnati, Chicago and St. Louis Railway Company v. Backus	439 (1894)	Brewer	none	Harlan	Ind.	affirmed
Interstate Commerce Commission v. Brimson	447 (1894)	Harlan	none	Brewer (at 155 U.S. 3)	C.C.N.D. Ill.	reversed

== Appendix to 154 U.S. ==
Volume 154 contains an extraordinary Appendix, starting at page 529, of "Some Cases not Hitherto Reported in Full". The previously unpublished opinions in the Appendix were issued from 1852 to 1883. An explanation for the Appendix is given at page 531:

The Centennial Appendix, at the end of Volume 131 [of U.S. Reports], contained two tables of omitted cases. In the first table the cases were reported in full. The second contained only a list of cases, term by term [see pages ccxx to ccxxxi], in which opinions were given which were supposed to decide the case on the facts; or on the authority of some case referred to; or in which the decision was made partly on the facts and partly on such authority; or in which judgment was entered either on the stipulation of the parties, or for incompleteness of the record, or for non-compliance with the rules of court. It was assumed that it was not worth while to occupy the space necessary to report these cases in full. The fact that two or three of them have been referred to in opinions of the court, since rendered, shows that this assumption was not well founded, and calls upon the reporter now to print them in full.

== List of cases in Appendix to volume 154 U.S., decided 1852–83 ==
Case Name	Page and year	Opinion of the Court	Concurring opinion(s)	Dissenting opinion(s)	Lower Court	Disposition
United States v. Bales of Cotton Marked J.H.B.	556 (1868)	Chase	none	none	C.C.E.D. La.	reversed
United States v. Barnett	676 (1882)	Waite	none	none	Ct. Cl.	affirmed
United States ex rel. Amy v. Burlington	568 (1870)	Swayne	none	none	C.C.D. Iowa	reversed
United States v. Burton	566 (1869)	Nelson	none	none	Ct. Cl.	reversed
United States v. Cook	555 (1868)	Swayne	none	none	C.C.S.D. Ohio	certification
United States v. De Haro	544 (1866)	Grier	none	none	C.C.N.D. Cal.	dismissed
United States v. Hodson	580 (1870)	Swayne	none	none	C.C.D. Wis.	reversed
United States v. Mayrand	552 (1867)	Chase	none	none	C.C.D. Minn.	certification
United States v. Mynderse	580 (1871)	Chase	none	none	C.C.N.D.N.Y.	certification
United States v. Pollard	577 (1870)	Davis	none	none	Ct. Cl.	affirmed
United States v. Six Lots	596 (1874)	Strong	none	none	C.C.D. La.	reversed
United States v. Stafford	590 (1873)	Chase	none	none	C.C.M.D. Tenn.	certification
United States v. Williams	652 (1880)	Waite	none	none	Ct. Cl.	affirmed
Upton v. Mason	675 (1882)	Waite	none	none	Sup. Ct. Terr. Wyo.	affirmed
Upton v. Steele	675 (1882)	Waite	none	none	Sup. Ct. Terr. Wyo.	dismissed
Van Norden v. Washburn	627 (1877)	Waite	none	none	La.	dismissed
Ex parte Waples	579 (1871)	Swayne	none	none	original	prohibition denied
Washington County v. United States ex rel. Mortimer	571 (1870)	Strong	none	none	C.C.D. Iowa	affirmed
Whitney v. First National Bank	664 (1880)	Waite	none	none	Vt.	reversed
Willard v. Willard	568 (1870)	Nelson	none	none	Sup. Ct. D.C.	reversed
Williams v. Nolan	551 (1866)	Nelson	none	none	N.Y.	reversed
Williamson v. Moore	557 (1868)	Clifford	none	none	N.Y.	dismissal denied
Watterson v. Payne	534 (1858)	Taney	none	none	C.C.E.D. La.	affirmed
Wilson v. Goodrich	640 (1878)	Waite	none	none	Mass. Super. Ct.	affirmed
Windsor v. McVeigh	617 (1875)	Waite	none	none	Va. Corp. Ct.	dismissal denied
Woodman Pebbling Machine Company v. Guild	597 (1874)	Clifford	none	none	C.C.D. Mass.	reversed
Woolfolk v. Nisbet	650 (1879)	Waite	none	none	C.C.S.D. Ga.	affirmed
Underhill v. Patton	575 (1870)	Nelson	none	none	C.C.N.D. Ill.	affirmed
Tillinghast v. Van Buskirk I	557 (1869)	Davis	none	none	N.Y. Sup. Ct.	reversed
Tillinghast v. Van Buskirk II	553 (1867)	Miller	none	none	N.Y. Sup. Ct.	dismissal denied
Thompson v. Perrine	677 (1883)	Harlan	none	none	C.C.S.D.N.Y.	affirmed
Poweshiek County v. United States ex rel. Durant	576 (1870)	Nelson	none	none	C.C.D. Iowa	affirmed
Supervisors v. Durant	571 (1870)	Strong	none	none	C.C.D. Iowa	affirmed
Sturtevant v. Herndon	575 (1870)	Nelson	none	none	C.C.N.D. Ill.	affirmed
Stevens v. De Aubrie	580 (1870)	Davis	none	none	Kan.	affirmed
Steever v. Rickman	678 (1883)	Waite	none	none	C.C.D. Ky.	affirmed
South Carolina ex rel. Robb v. Gurney	593 (1873)	Hunt	none	none	S.C.	reversed
Sea v. Connecticut Mutual Life Insurance Company	659 (1880)	Waite	none	none	C.C.N.D. Ill.	dismissed
Schow v. Harriman	609 (1875)	Field	none	none	C.C.D. Minn.	affirmed
Roberts v. Bolles	670 (1881)	Waite	none	none	C.C.N.D. Ill.	affirmed
Richmond Mining Company v. Eureka Mining Company	664 (1881)	Waite	none	none	C.C.D. Nev.	affirmed
Ralls County Court v. United States ex rel. George	675 (1882)	Waite	none	none	C.C.E.D. Mo.	affirmed
Priest v. Folger	597 (1874)	Hunt	none	none	Mass.	affirmed
Ponder v. Delanney	651 (1880)	Waite	none	none	C.C.S.D. Ga.	affirmed
Plant v. Stovall	584 (1872)	Chase	none	none	Ga.	affirmed
Pittsburgh Locomotive and Car Works v. National Bank	626 (1877)	Waite	none	none	C.C.D. Iowa	dismissed
Ex parte Pargoud	567 (1870)	Nelson	none	none	Ct. Cl.	mandamus granted
Oulton v. Savings and Loan Society	615 (1875)	Waite	none	none	C.C.D. Cal.	reversed
Oulton v. San Francisco Savings Union	591 (1873)	Clifford	none	none	C.C.D. Cal.	reversed
Oulton v. California Insurance Company	615 (1875)	Waite	none	none	C.C.D. Cal.	reversed
Norton v. Jamison	591 (1873)	Chase	none	none	La.	dismissed
Northwestern Life Insurance Company v. Martin	640 (1878)	Waite	none	none	C.C.W.D. Tenn.	dismissed
Moulder v. Forrest	567 (1869)	Chase	none	none	Sup. Ct. D.C.	dismissed
Morrill v. Wisconsin	626 (1877)	Waite	none	none	Wis.	affirmed
Mississippi v. Stanton	554 (1867)	Nelson	none	none	original	dismissed
Town of Mineral Point v. Lee	552 (1867)	Chase	none	none	C.C.D. Wis.	affirmed
Ex parte Milwaukee and Minnesota Railroad Company	554 (1868)	Nelson	none	none	C.C.D. Wis.	mandamus denied
Mackall v. Richards	624 (1877)	Waite	none	none	Sup. Ct. D.C.	affirmed
McCready v. Virginia	628 (1877)	Waite	none	none	Va.	affirmed
McCollum v. Howard	577 (1870)	Field	none	none	C.C.D. Iowa	dismissed
The Louisville	657 (1880)	Waite	none	none	C.C.S.D. Ill.	affirmed
Ex parte Loud	582 (1872)	Swayne	none	none	C.C.E.D.N.Y.	dismissed
Levy v. Dangel	671 (1881)	Waite	none	none	Sup. Ct. Terr. Idaho	affirmed
Lee County v. Clews	609 (1874)	Hunt	none	none	C.C.M.D. Ala.	affirmed
City of Leavenworth v. Kinney	642 (1879)	Waite	none	none	C.C.D. Kan.	affirmed
Lane v. United States	615 (1875)	Waite	none	none	Ct. Cl.	affirmed
Lammers v. Nissen	650 (1879)	Waite	none	none	Neb.	affirmed
Keogh v. Orient Insurance Company	639 (1878)	Waite	none	none	Sup. Ct. D.C.	dismissed
Kenner v. United States	595 (1874)	Strong	none	none	C.C.D. La.	affirmed
Kahn v. Hamilton	677 (1882)	Waite	none	none	Sup. Ct. Terr. Utah	dismissed
Jouan v. Divoll	657 (1880)	Waite	none	none	Sup. Ct. D.C.	affirmed
Jones v. Fritschle	590 (1873)	Chase	none	none	C.C.D. Mo.	dismissed
Jaeger v. Moore	641 (1879)	Waite	none	none	Sup. Ct. D.C.	multiple
Ingersoll v. Bourne	645 (1878)	Waite	none	none	C.C.S.D. Miss.	dismissed
Hunt v. Bender	556 (1868)	Chase	none	none	Sup. Ct. Terr. Neb.	dismissed
Humbird v. Jackson County	592 (1873)	Clifford	none	none	C.C.W.D. Wis.	reversed
Hearst v. Halligan	669 (1881)	Harlan	none	none	C.C.E.D. Mo.	affirmed
Haynes v. Pickett	627 (1877)	Waite	none	none	La.	affirmed
Hammond v. Massachusetts	550 (1866)	Nelson	none	none	Mass. Super. Ct.	affirmed
Hagar v. California	639 (1878)	Waite	none	none	Cal.	dismissed
Gurnee v. Blair	659 (1879)	Waite	none	none	C.C.N.D. Ill.	conditional dismissal
Groat v. O'Hare	660 (1880)	Waite	none	none	Sup. Ct. D.C.	reversed
Gray v. Coan	589 (1871)	Chase	none	none	Iowa	dismissed
Grame v. Mutual Assurance Society	676 (1881)	Waite	none	none	Va.	continued
Godbe v. Tottle	576 (1870)	Chase	none	none	Sup. Ct. Terr. Utah	dismissed
Davies v. Slidell	625 (1876)	Waite	none	none	La.	affirmed
Diaz v. United States	590 (1873)	Chase	none	none	C.C.D. Cal.	affirmed
The Eliza Hancox	618 (1875)	Waite	none	none	C.C.S.D. Ga.	affirmed
Faxon v. Russell	644 (1879)	Waite	none	none	C.C.D. Mass.	reversed
Follansbee v. Ballard Paving Company	651 (1879)	Waite	none	none	Sup. Ct. D.C.	dismissed
Fontaine v. McNab	652 (1880)	Waite	none	none	C.C.S.D. Ga.	affirmed
Gage v. Carraher	656 (1880)	Waite	none	none	C.C.N.D. Ill.	affirmed
Gaines v. Lizardi	555 (1868)	Davis	none	none	C.C.E.D. La.	reversed
Garnett v. United States	579 (1871)	Swayne	none	none	Sup. Ct. D.C.	unclear
Davidson v. Starcher	566 (1869)	Chase	none	none	Minn.	dismissed
Davidson v. Connelly	589 (1872)	Chase	none	none	Minn.	dismissed
Dallas County v. Huidekoper	654 (1880)	Waite	none	none	C.C.W.D. Mo.	affirmed
Cowdrey v. Vandenburgh	659 (1880)	Field	none	none	Sup. Ct. D.C.	affirmed
Cousin v. Generes	581 (1871)	Chase	none	none	La.	dismissed
Corry v. Campbell	629 (1878)	Waite	none	none	Ohio	affirmed
Connellsville and Southern Pennsylvania Railroad Company v. City of Baltimore	553 (1867)	Chase	none	none	C.C.W.D. Pa.	dismissal denied
Allen v. Tarlton	596 (1874)	Waite	none	none	La.	dismissed
Atherton v. Fowler	620 (1875)	Waite	none	none	Cal.	dismissal denied
Badger v. Ranlett	677 (1882)	Blatchford	none	none	C.C.E.D. La.	affirmed
Bailey v. Work	616 (1875)	Field	none	none	C.C.S.D.N.Y.	affirmed
Bank of Montreal v. White	660 (1880)	Waite	none	none	C.C.N.D. Ill.	affirmed
Bank of New Orleans v. Caldwell	592 (1873)	Chase	none	none	C.C.D. La.	affirmed
Bank of the Republic v. Millard	656 (1879)	Waite	none	none	Sup. Ct. D.C.	dismissed
Basse v. Brownsville	610 (1875)	Waite	none	none	Tex.	dismissed
Benton County v. Rollens	665 (1880)	Waite	none	none	C.C.W.D. Mo.	affirmed
Betts v. Mugridge	644 (1879)	Waite	none	none	C.C.N.D. Ill.	affirmed
Blake v. Fourth National Bank	616 (1875)	Hunt	none	none	multiple	reversed
Brown v. Johnson	551 (1867)	Nelson	none	none	C.C.S.D. Miss.	reversed
Brugere v. Slidell	598 (1874)	Strong	none	none	La.	affirmed
Burke v. Tregre	641 (1879)	Waite	none	none	La.	affirmed
Burlington and Missouri River Railroad v. Mills County	568 (1870)	Nelson	none	none	Iowa	affirmed
Burr v. Myers	654 (1880)	Waite	none	none	Sup. Ct. D.C.	dismissed
Case v. Marchand	642 (1879)	Miller	none	none	C.C.D. La.	affirmed
City of Charleston v. Jessup	592 (1873)	Field	none	none	C.C.D.S.C.	reversed
Chicago and Alton Railroad Company v. Wiggins Ferry Company	678 (1883)	Waite	none	none	C.C.E.D. Mo.	affirmed
Chicago and Northwestern Railway Company v. Fuller	595 (1873)	Swayne	none	none	Iowa	affirmed
Churchill v. City of Utica	550 (1866)	Nelson	none	none	N.Y.	reversed
Coggeshall v. Hartshorn	533 (1856)	Taney	none	none	C.C.D. Mass.	multiple
United States v. Harrison	531 (1852)	Taney	none	none	E.D. La.	reversed
United States v. Carrere	532 (1853)	Taney	none	none	E.D. La.	reversed
Steamboat Niagara	533 (1855)	Taney	none	none	C.C.S.D.N.Y.	dismissed
United States v. Osio	535 (1860)	Clifford	none	none	C.C.N.D. Cal.	dismissed
Richardson v. Lawrence County	536 (1864)	Grier	none	none	C.C.W.D. Pa.	certification
United States v. Hallock	537 (1864)	Grier	none	none	S.D. Fla.	reversed
United States v. Olvera	538 (1864)	Nelson	none	none	C.C.S.D. Cal.	affirmed
Milwaukee and Minnesota Railroad Company v. Soutter I	540 (1864)	Nelson	none	none	C.C.D. Wis.	dismissed
Milwaukee and Minnesota Railroad Company v. Soutter II	541 (1864)	Nelson	none	none	C.C.D. Wis.	dismissed
Merriam v. Haas	542 (1865)	Miller	none	none	C.C.D. Minn.	reversed
Rogers v. City of Keokuk	546 (1866)	Grier	none	none	C.C.D. Iowa.	certification
Rogers v. Lee County	547 (1866)	Grier	none	none	C.C.D. Iowa	reversed
Duvall v. United States	548 (1866)	Swayne	none	none	C.C.D. Md.	affirmed
Horback v. Porter	549 (1865)	Miller	none	none	Sup. Ct. Terr. Neb.	affirmed
Burbank v. Bigelow	558 (1869)	Miller	none	none	C.C.E.D. La.	affirmed
Smith v. Washington Gaslight Company	559 (1869)	Chase	none	none	Sup. Ct. D.C.	affirmed
Finley v. Isett	561 (1869)	Miller	none	none	C.C.D. Iowa	affirmed
Dutton v. Plairet	563 (1869)	Chase	none	none	Pa.	affirmed
United States v. Mowry	564 (1869)	Nelson	none	none	Ct. Cl.	reversed
United States v. Morgan	565 (1869)	Nelson	none	none	Ct. Cl.	reversed
Flanders v. Tweed	569 (1870)	Nelson	none	none	C.C.D. La.	reversed
Weed v. Crane	570 (1870)	Chase	none	none	C.C.D. Mass.	affirmed
The Northern Belle	571 (1870)	Miller	none	none	C.C.D. Wis.	affirmed
City of Kenosha v. Lamson	573 (1870)	Nelson	none	none	C.C.D. Wis.	affirmed
Long v. Patton	573 (1870)	Nelson	none	none	C.C.N.D. Ill.	affirmed
Underhill v. Herndon	574 (1870)	Nelson	none	none	C.C.N.D. Ill.	affirmed
Riley v. Welles	578 (1870)	Nelson	none	none	C.C.D. Iowa	affirmed
Van Slyke v. Wisconsin	581 (1871)	Chase	none	none	Wis.	affirmed
Holmes v. Sevier	582 (1872)	Swayne	none	none	C.C.E.D. Ark.	reversed
Jacoway v. Denton	583 (1872)	Swayne	none	none	Ark.	dismissed
The Des Moines	584 (1872)	Davis	none	none	C.C.D. Mo.	affirmed
The St. John	586 (1872)	Bradley	none	none	C.C.S.D.N.Y.	affirmed
Germain v. Mason	587 (1872)	Chase	none	none	Sup. Ct. Terr. Mont.	dismissed
Northwestern Union Packet Company v. Home Insurance Company of New York	588 (1872)	Chase	none	none	Iowa	dismissed
The Adelia	593 (1873)	Bradley	none	none	C.C.E.D. Pa.	affirmed
Hardy v. Harbin	598 (1874)	Hunt	none	none	C.C.D. Cal.	affirmed
Northwestern Union Packet Company v. Viles	608 (1874)	Strong	none	none	C.C.E.D. Wis.	reversed
Rogers Locomotive and Machine Works v. Helm	610 (1875)	Hunt	none	none	C.C.S.D. Miss.	affirmed
Commercial Bank v. Iola	617 (1875)	Miller	none	none	C.C.D. Kan.	affirmed
Turner v. Ward	618 (1876)	Waite	none	none	C.C.E.D. Mich.	affirmed
Crary v. Devlin	619 (1876)	Waite	none	none	N.Y.	dismissed
Mead v. Pinyard	620 (1876)	Hunt	none	none	C.C.W.D. Mich.	affirmed
Berreyesa v. United States	623 (1876)	Waite	none	none	D. Cal.	affirmed
Herhold v. Upton	624 (1876)	Waite	none	none	C.C.N.D. Ill.	affirmed
Johansson v. Stephanson	625 (1877)	Waite	none	none	C.C.N.D. Ill.	affirmed
First National Bank v. Cook	628 (1878)	Waite	none	none	C.C.S.D. Ohio	affirmed
The Northfield	629 (1878)	Hunt	none	none	C.C.S.D.N.Y.	affirmed
Clark v. Beecher	631 (1878)	Swayne	none	none	C.C.S.D.N.Y.	affirmed
Strong v. United States	632 (1878)	Harlan	none	none	Ct. Cl.	affirmed
Goodenough Horseshoe Manufacturing Company v. Rhode Island Horseshoe Company	635 (1877)	Waite	none	none	N.Y. Sup. Ct.	dismissed
United States v. Atchison, Topeka and Santa Fe Railway Company	637 (1878)	Field	none	none	Ct. Cl.	affirmed
Indianapolis and St. Louis Railroad Company v. Vance	638 (1878)	Harlan	none	none	C.C.S.D. Ill.	affirmed
Dold v. United States	645 (1878)	Waite	none	none	Ct. Cl.	affirmed
Williams v. United States	648 (1879)	Waite	none	none	Ct. Cl.	affirmed
North v. McDonald	649 (1879)	Waite	none	none	Sup. Ct. Terr. Wyo.	affirmed
Grand Trunk Railway Company of Canada v. Walker	653 (1880)	Waite	none	none	C.C.D. Me.	affirmed
Dallas County v. Huidekoper	655 (1880)	Waite	none	none	C.C.W.D. Mo.	affirmed
Woodfolk v. Seddons	658 (1880)	Waite	none	none	C.C.E.D. Ark.	affirmed
White v. United States	661 (1880)	Waite	none	none	Ct. Cl.	affirmed
McLaughlin v. Fowler	663 (1880)	Waite	none	none	Cal.	affirmed
Seward v. Comeau	665 (1881)	Waite	none	none	C.C.D. La.	affirmed
Wight v. Condict	666 (1881)	Waite	none	none	C.C.S.D.N.Y.	affirmed
France v. Missouri ex rel. Smith	667 (1880)	Waite	none	none	Mo.	dismissed
Green v. Fisk	668 (1881)	Waite	none	none	C.C.D. La.	dismissed
Price v. Kelly	669 (1881)	Waite	none	none	C.C.D. Minn.	affirmed
Glover v. Love	670 (1881)	Waite	none	none	C.C.E.D. Mo.	affirmed
Continental Bank Note Company v. United States	671 (1882)	Waite	none	none	Ct. Cl.	affirmed
Bonnifield v. Price	672 (1882)	Waite	none	none	Sup. Ct. Terr. Wyo.	dismissed
Mellon v. Delaware, Lackawanna and Western Railroad Company	673 (1882)	Woods	none	none	C.C.W.D. Pa.	affirmed
United States v. Canda	674 (1882)	Waite	none	none	C.C.E.D. Mo.	dismissed

== See also ==
- Certificate of division
