= Rebecca Duncan =

American judge (born 1971)

Justice of the Oregon Supreme Court
- Incumbent
- Assumed office July 1, 2017
- Appointed by: Kate Brown
- Preceded by: David V. Brewer

Personal details
- Born: 1971 (age 54–55) Wisconsin, U.S.
- Education: University of Wisconsin, Madison (BA); University of Michigan (JD)

Rebecca A. Duncan (born 1971) is an American attorney and jurist serving as a justice of the Oregon Supreme Court. She previously served on the Oregon Court of Appeals from 2010 to 2017.

== Early life and education ==
Duncan was born in Wisconsin in 1971, and graduated from Catholic Central High School in Burlington, Wisconsin in 1989. She attended Reed College in Portland, Oregon for two years, and then transferred to the University of Wisconsin–Madison, where she completed her bachelor's degree in 1993. Duncan completed a J.D. degree at the University of Michigan Law School in 1996.

== Career ==
Duncan moved to Oregon in 1996, to work as a trial attorney in the public defender's office in Washington and Multnomah counties. From 2000 to 2010, she was lawyer with the appellate division of the Oregon Office of Public Defense Services, and regularly practiced before the Oregon Supreme Court and Oregon Court of Appeals, arguing 90 cases before these two courts from 2005 to 2010.

In January 2010, the Governor of Oregon Ted Kulongoski appointed Duncan as a judge on the Oregon Court of Appeals, to succeed retiring judge Walter Edmonds. She was retained by voters in 2010 and 2016 elections.

In May 2017, Governor Kate Brown appointed Duncan as a justice of the Oregon Supreme Court, to succeed retiring Justice David V. Brewer. She was sworn in on July 1, 2017. Her current term ends in January 2025, and she is up for election in May 2024.

Duncan's appointment to the Oregon Supreme Court gave that court a female majority for the first time.

== Personal life ==
Duncan resides in Salem, where the Supreme Court is located. She has a husband and two daughters.

Legal offices
Preceded by David V. Brewer	Justice of the Oregon Supreme Court; 2017–present	Incumbent
