= United States v. Burton =

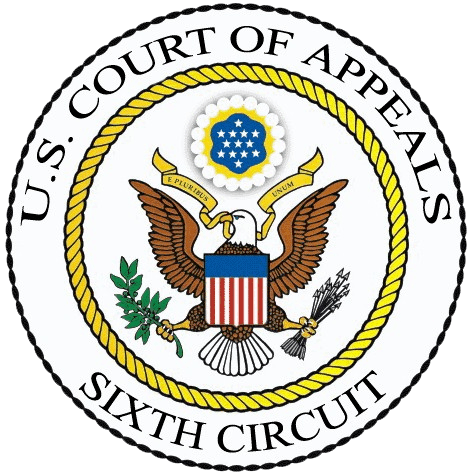
- Court: United States Court of Appeals for the Sixth Circuit
- Full case name: United States v. Burton
- Argued: April 20, 1989
- Decided: January 17, 1990
- Citation: 894 F.2d 188

Case history
- Subsequent history: Rehearing denied, March 22, 1990; cert. denied, 498 U.S. 857 (1990)

Court membership
- Judges sitting: Nathaniel R. Jones, Albert J. Engel Jr., George E. Woods (E.D. Mich.)

Case opinions
- Majority: Engel, joined by Woods
- Concurrence: Jones

Laws applied
- U.S. Const. amend. IV

United States v. Burton, 894 F.2d 188 (6th Cir.), cert. denied, 498 U.S. 857 (1990) is a United States Court of Appeals for the Sixth Circuit court decision relating to the open fields doctrine limiting the scope of the Fourth Amendment of the U.S. Constitution.

Acting on information that the defendant was cultivating marijuana, two members of the Kentucky State Police, without a search warrant, entered on to the defendant's farm in Warren County, Kentucky. In order to enter the property the two officers climbed over two series of fences which had "No Trespassing" signs posted all around them.

Upon discovering large quantities of marijuana being grown, the defendant was arrested and charged with four drug related counts. The defendant was convicted of a lesser included offense, of which he appealed challenging that his Fourth Amendment rights had been violated. The Court of Appeals upheld the conviction, stating that the case was too factually similar to the Supreme Court's ruling in Oliver v. United States to justify exclusion of the evidence. The Court of Appeals stated:

The only difference between the cases is that here the police climbed over a fence and a locked gate, whereas in Oliver, the officers went around a locked gate. Given the cited language from Oliver, it is evident that this distinction is not of constitutional significance. The same is true of Burton's claim that the police entry onto his land constituted a trespass under Kentucky State law. The Supreme Court, in Oliver, addressed this issue, in the identical context of Kentucky law, observing in the case of open fields, the general rights of property protected by the common law of trespass have little or no relevance to the applicability of the Fourth Amendment.
