= Ryan Timothy O'Connor =

American judge

Ryan T. O'Connor

Judge of the Oregon Court of Appeals
- Incumbent
- Assumed office February 2025
- Appointed by: Tina Kotek
- Preceded by: Josephine Mooney

Personal details
- Born: Ryan Timothy O'Connor c. 1978 (age 47–48) Olympia, Washington, U.S.
- Education: University of Portland; University of Notre Dame (J.D.)
- Occupation: Attorney, jurist

Ryan Timothy O'Connor (born c. 1978) is an American attorney and judge who serves on the Oregon Court of Appeals. His successful argument before the Oregon Supreme Court in Watkins v. Ackley applied the U.S. Supreme Court's ban on nonunanimous jury verdicts retroactively to hundreds of Oregon cases.

== Early life and education ==
O'Connor was born circa 1978 in Olympia, Washington. He earned his undergraduate degree from the University of Portland and his Juris Doctor from the University of Notre Dame Law School.

== Career ==
O'Connor began his legal career working in the Office of Public Defense Services in Oregon. He later became a partner at O'Connor Weber LLC, an appellate advocacy law firm in Oregon, and served as Co-Executive Director of Equal Justice Law.

O'Connor served as lead counsel in Watkins v. Ackley, representing Jacob Watkins, who had been convicted of four felonies by a 10–2 jury verdict in 2010. Following the U.S. Supreme Court's 2020 decision in Ramos v. Louisiana, which struck down nonunanimous jury verdicts as unconstitutional, O'Connor and his team argued that the ruling should apply retroactively to Oregon convictions. In December 2022, the Oregon Supreme Court ruled unanimously in favor of O'Connor's client, determining that the ban on nonunanimous jury verdicts applied to all Oregon convictions, including those finalized before the Ramos decision. The decision affected an estimated 300 people incarcerated in Oregon based on nonunanimous jury verdicts.

=== Oregon Court of Appeals ===
On February 19, 2025, Governor Tina Kotek announced O'Connor's appointment to the Oregon Court of Appeals to fill the vacancy created by the resignation of Judge Josephine Mooney. The appointment was effective immediately.
