= Fire cider =

A flavored apple cider vinegar made of common herbs and spices

Fire cider is a flavored vinegar made by infusing apple cider vinegar with onions, garlic and horseradish. Sometimes citrus, ginger, turmeric, black pepper, honey and hot peppers are also added. It is steeped for weeks and used once it becomes tangy and hot. This flavored vinegar is commonly used as a home remedy, purported to boost digestion and improve immune system function, among other things. There is criticism from nutritionists, however, regarding a lack of scientific evidence to support these claims.

In 2012 a Massachusetts company called Shire City Herbals trademarked the name Fire Cider and started selling it. However, Dana St. Pierre also claim to have trademarked it. A number of herbalists say that they have been using the term Fire Cider since 1980s. An October 2019 ruling established that ‘Fire Cider’ is a generic term and cannot be trademarked in the United States.
