= Hester v. United States =

- Supreme Court of the United States

Argued April 24, 1924 Decided May 5, 1924
- Full case name: Hester v. United States
- Citations: 265 U.S. 57 (more) 44 S. Ct. 445; 68 L. Ed. 898; 1924 U.S. LEXIS 2577

Holding
- "The special protection accorded by the Fourth Amendment to the people in their 'persons, houses, papers and effects', is not extended to the open fields."

Court membership
- Chief Justice William H. Taft Associate Justices Joseph McKenna · Oliver W. Holmes Jr. Willis Van Devanter · James C. McReynolds; Louis Brandeis · George Sutherland; Pierce Butler · Edward T. Sanford

Case opinion
- Majority: Holmes, joined by unanimous

Laws applied
- U.S. Const. amend. IV

Hester v. United States, 265 U.S. 57 (1924), is a decision by the United States Supreme Court, which established the open-fields doctrine. In an opinion written by Justice Oliver Wendell Holmes, the Court held that "the special protection accorded by the Fourth Amendment to the people in their 'persons, houses, papers and effects', is not extended to the open fields."

== See also ==
- List of United States Supreme Court cases, volume 265
- Katz v. United States (1967)
- Oliver v. United States (1984)
- Open fields doctrine
