= Open-fields doctrine =

American legal rule allowing warrantless searches of private property not near houses

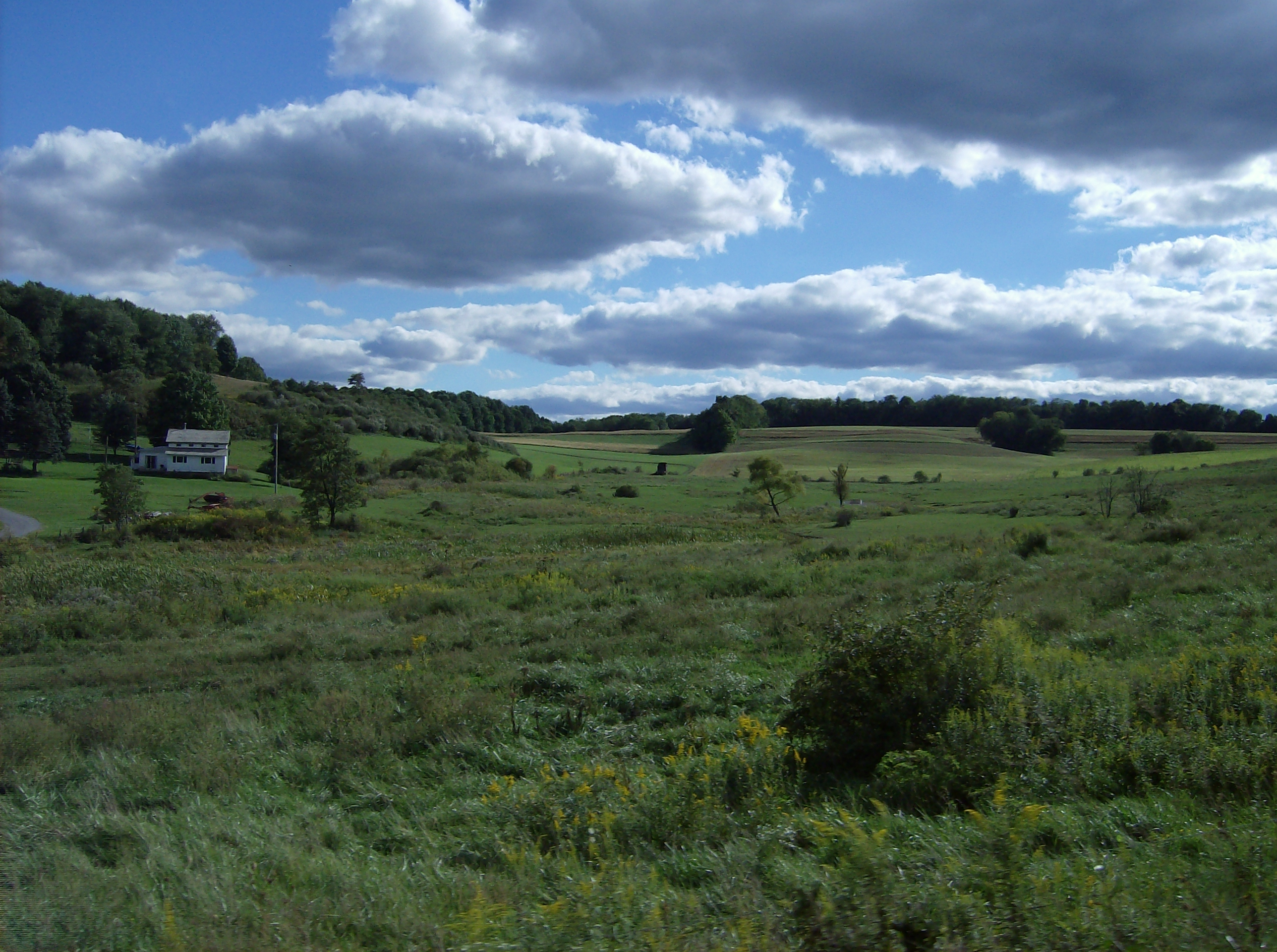
Open fields near Lisbon, Ohio.

The open-fields doctrine (also open-field doctrine or open-fields rule), in the U.S. law of criminal procedure, is the legal doctrine that a "warrantless search of the area outside a property owner's curtilage" does not violate the Fourth Amendment to the United States Constitution. However, "unless there is some other legal basis for the search," such a search "must exclude the home and any adjoining land (such as a yard) that is within an enclosure or otherwise protected from public scrutiny."

== History ==
The open fields doctrine was first articulated by the U.S. Supreme Court in Hester v. United States, which stated that "the special protection accorded by the Fourth Amendment to the people in their 'persons, houses, papers, and effects,' is not extended to the open fields." This opinion appears to be decided on the basis that "open fields are not a "constitutionally protected area" because they cannot be construed as "persons, houses, papers, [or] effects."

This method of reasoning gave way with the arrival of the landmark case Katz v. United States, which established a two-part test for what constitutes a search within the meaning of the Fourth Amendment. The relevant criteria are "first that a person have exhibited an actual (subjective) expectation of privacy and, second, that the expectation be one that society is prepared to recognize as reasonable'." Under this new analysis of the Fourth Amendment, a search of an object or area where a person has no reasonable expectation of privacy is, in a legal sense, not a search at all. That search, therefore, does not trigger the protections of the Fourth Amendment.

In Oliver v. United States, the Supreme Court held that a privacy expectation regarding an open field is unreasonable:

… open fields do not provide the setting for those intimate activities that the Amendment is intended to shelter from government interference or surveillance. There is no societal interest in protecting the privacy of those activities, such as the cultivation of crops, that occur in open fields.

== Distinguishing open fields from curtilage ==
While open fields are not protected by the Fourth Amendment, the curtilage, or outdoor area immediately surrounding the home, may be protected. Courts have treated this area as an extension of the house and as such subject to all the privacy protections afforded a person's home (unlike a person's open fields) under the Fourth Amendment. An area is curtilage if it "harbors the intimate activity associated with the sanctity of a man's home and the privacies of life." Courts make this determination by examining "the proximity of the area claimed to be curtilage to the home, whether the area is included within an enclosure surrounding the home, the nature of the uses to which the area is put, and the steps taken by the resident to protect the area from observation by people passing by." Theoretically, many structures might extend the curtilage protection to the areas immediately surrounding them. The courts have gone so far as to treat a tent as a home for Fourth Amendment purposes in the past.

Despite this rather broad interpretation of curtilage, the courts seem willing to find areas to be outside of the curtilage if they are in any way separate from the home (by a fence, great distance, other structures, even certain plants).

== Rejections of doctrine by state courts ==
Since Oliver, the highest courts of Montana, New York, Oregon, Pennsylvania, and Vermont, as well as a Washington state appeals court, have rejected the open-fields doctrine as a matter of state constitutional law, in light of their state constitutions granting greater protections to citizens (under dual sovereignty a state may grant its citizens additional rights on top of those guaranteed in the federal constitution). Since Katz grounded privacy in persons rather than places, they argue, landowners who have taken affirmative steps to exclude the public such as fencing or posting the bounds assert a privacy interest sufficient to prevail over any warrantless search of the property where common exceptions such as hot pursuit and plain view do not apply. Some of those opinions have been critical of not only Oliver but Hester.

In a 2017 concurring opinion where the doctrine did not come into play in overturning a Wisconsin farmer's convictions for threatening two state game wardens he believed had been illegal hunters trespassing on his land, Justice Rebecca Bradley of that state's Supreme Court was highly critical of it.

=== State v. Dixson ===
State v. Dixson
- Court: Oregon Supreme Court
- Full case name: State of Oregon v. Theresa Dixson, Jeffrey Digby and Lorin Lou Dixson
- Decided: December 20, 1988
- Citation: 766 P.2d 1015, 307 Or. 195

Case history
- Prior actions: State v. Dixson et al, 740 P.2d 1124, (Or.App., 1987)
- Appealed from: Oregon Court of Appeals

Court membership
- Judge sitting: 7

Case opinions
- Decision by: W. Michael Gillette

Keywords
- Search; Seizure

Within a year of Oliver, deputy sheriffs in Coos County, Oregon, followed up on a tip that marijuana was being grown on a local lumber company's land. After flying over the property in question and observing possible groves of the plant, then seeing a truck carrying water onto the property via a private access road, the deputies followed the road, past a cable stretched across it, signs prohibiting hunting on the property, and a felled tree, past which they had to proceed on foot to a dwelling at the center of the 40 acres (16 ha) of forest. From the dwelling they were able to see cannabis planted 800 feet (240 m) away, outside the curtilage of the house. The couple who were in the process of buying the property, and a friend who was helping them grow the plants, were arrested and later convicted of manufacturing and possessing a controlled substance.

==== Oregon Court of Appeals ====
The appeals court reversed the conviction after hearing the appeal en banc in 1987. "The decisive issue is not, as the trial court apparently thought, one of federal law", Judge Thomas Young wrote for the plurality. "Whether defendant's land is constitutionally protected depends, in the first instance, not on United States Supreme Court cases interpreting the Fourth Amendment, but on the basic principles underlying the Oregon Constitution ... we need not join the federal retreat from the constitutional requirements."

"[D]oes the constitution protect property as property, or is its protection of property a means to a greater end?" Young asked. The majority believed the answer was the latter, to which Young cited writings of William Pitt, 1st Earl of Chatham, who strongly supported the colonists in the years before the American Revolution, in support of their understanding of this concept of privacy: "The poorest man may, in his cottage, bid defiance to all the forces of the Crown." The U.S. Supreme Court had also recognized "the indefeasible right of personal security" as what is most breached by a search in its 1886 Boyd case.

Oregon's Supreme Court had, since 1931, recognized this as a privacy interest, Young wrote, and as he found little guidance in federal privacy cases beyond the instant issues of those cases, the majority looked to Oregon case law as it had interpreted Article I, Section 9, of the state constitution, the counterpart to the Fourth Amendment. Young found Katz's two-part test unhelpful and flawed: "The proper question, thus, is not what the defendant expects or whether that expectation is reasonable but whether the constitution protects the defendant." (Note: Emphasis in original) In this case, Young concluded, the deputies had trespassed on the Dixsons' land and violated their privacy.

Judge John Buttler wrote a special concurrence for himself and two colleagues, reaching the same conclusion as the plurality but basing it on different logic which he felt was more in compliance with state Supreme Court precedent: "I would hold that, if it is necessary for the officers to trespass on property not within the curtilage in order to observe the activity or contraband in question, there is an unreasonable search and, therefore, any ensuing seizure would be unlawful." In the instant case, Buttler said that it had, as one of the deputies had testified that he and his partner had at all times believed they were on the lumber company's property and would not have entered without a warrant or permission had they known they were not.

Judge George Van Hoomissen wrote one of two dissents, taking issue with every aspect of the plurality opinion—arguing that there was no evidence that the framers of the state constitution had intended it be read more than literally, that the appeals court was ignoring earlier precedents that had explicitly adopted the open-fields doctrine, that the defendants had not raised a trespass claim against the deputies at trial, and that courts in other states with similar constitutional language had found it compatible with the doctrine. "[T]he plurality has hopelessly confused constitutional law with the civil and criminal law of trespass [and] ... substitutes its own social theories for the plain meaning of the specific constitutional text", he wrote. Van Hoomissen also noted that if the plurality needed guidance as to whether the citizens of Oregon had embraced an expectation of privacy around growing marijuana, the failure of a 1986 ballot measure that would have decriminalized the drug suggested otherwise.

A shorter dissent was written by Judge Kurt Rossman, joined by Mary Deits. While he agreed with the plurality that the state constitution was not meant to be read in a narrowly literal manner, and with the special concurrence's criticism of the plurality's disregard of precedent, he believed that the defendants had not established that they had a reasonable expectation of privacy, since the signage that the deputies passed simply said "No hunting" rather than "No trespassing" and the felled tree merely signaled an intent to deter vehicles, not foot traffic; thus the deputies could reasonably have believed they were still on lumber company land. "It is unnecessary to sail into uncharted waters by formulating a new, untested constitutional analysis, as the plurality and special concurrence have done."

==== Oregon Supreme Court ====
Prosecutors appealed the case to the Oregon Supreme Court, which heard arguments in March 1988 and returned its decision at the end of the year. Writing for a unanimous court, Justice W. Michael Gillette affirmed the lower court's holding that Article I, Section 9 provided broader privacy protection than the Fourth Amendment and thus the open-fields doctrine did not apply in state prosecutions.

After reviewing the facts of the case and all the appellate court's opinions, Gillette considered all the arguments. The two cases Van Hoommissen had pointed to as precedent adopting the open-fields doctrine were actually not dispositive of the issue, since one had involved a search on public land and the other appeared to rely on circumstances unique to that case. In another of its own recent holdings, he noted, the state Supreme Court had also rejected Katz''s reasonable expectation test, so in the instant case the court could consider the issue without relying on it.

Gillette rejected the textualist interpretation of the constitutional language that had been held by the Supreme Court and other states' courts to support the doctrine for three reasons. First, the court's own prior holdings recognized Article I, Section 9, as establishing a broad privacy interest beyond those items specified in it. Second, the Supreme Court had itself admitted in Katz that in extending privacy protection to the user of a phone booth it was going beyond any possible meaning of "persons, houses, papers and effects", as Justice Thurgood Marshall had noted in his Oliver dissent. Lastly, Gillette noted, if read literally the Fourth Amendment as well as Oregon's constitution would have only protected citizens in their own houses, and not in any other buildings. "If the individual has a privacy interest in land outside the curtilage of his dwelling, that privacy interest will not go unprotected simply because of its location."

Next, Gillette turned to the claim that common law recognized a distinction between the curtilage of a house and the property as a whole. In Hester, Justice Oliver Wendell Holmes had cited William Blackstone's Commentaries on the Laws of England, a common reference for English common law, in holding this distinction originated there. But Gillette quoted the passage Holmes had cited, in which Blackstone discussed what constituted burglary under common law, to cast doubt on Holmes' interpretation, noting that Blackstone had included all the possible outbuildings as places where unlawful entry and theft could be punished as burglary. Blackstone's chapter on trespass likewise specifically mentioned a man's land as legally protected. "Reliance on the common-law concept of curtilage to justify excluding land outside the curtilage from the protections of either constitutional provision is misplaced", Gillette concluded."

Lastly Gillette rejected the state's argument that whether land outside curtilage was covered by its owner's privacy interest depended on how that land was used. It depended, he wrote, on whether the owner had taken steps to exclude intruders, such as putting up fences or posting the bounds. "Allowing the police to intrude into private land, regardless of the steps taken by its occupant to keep it private, would be a significant limitation on the occupant's freedom from governmental scrutiny."

From this Gillette derived a "simple and objective" rule: "A person who wishes to preserve a constitutionally protected privacy interest in land outside the curtilage must manifest an intention to exclude the public by erecting barriers to entry, such as fences, or by posting signs." He then applied the rule to the instant case and found that it did not apply to the Dixsons since the signs they had posted on the road to their house barred only hunting. "There was no objective reason for the officers to believe that ... other uses such as hiking were forbidden" since it was common in Oregon for those uses to take place on large tracts of privately owned land where it was not expressly forbidden. Therefore, having affirmed the appeals court's rejection of the open-fields doctrine, the state's Supreme Court reversed it on the specific issues of the case and affirmed the conviction.

=== State v. Kirchoff ===
State v. Kirchoff
- Court: Vermont Supreme Court
- Decided: January 25, 1991
- Citation: 156 Vt. 1, 587 A.2d 988

Court membership
- Judges sitting: Allen, Peck, Dooley, Morse, Springer (specially assigned)

Case opinions
- Decision by: Morse
- Concurrence: Springer
- Dissent: Peck

Keywords
- search; seizure

A case that had begun before Oliver provided the Vermont Supreme Court with its opportunity to consider the open-fields doctrine almost a decade later. In 1982 Robert Kirchoff bought a 39-acre (16 ha) parcel in the town of Lincoln, Vermont, posted it and filed a notice to that effect with the town clerk. He allowed some of his neighbors to ride their bicycles on trails that crossed the property, but otherwise did not allow any access.

Kirchoff had been living there for four years when the Addison County sheriff received a tip that he was growing marijuana on his land. The sheriff and another law enforcement officer went to a neighboring house, crossed a fence, and followed an old logging road past some old "no trespassing" signs. They left the road and found the growing cannabis plants in the woods roughly 100 yards (91 m) from his house, invisible from the road.

The sheriff called in two other officers to keep an eye on the marijuana while they got a search warrant. Kirchoff went out to tend them at this point, and admitted to the officers that he had been growing them. When the sheriff returned, he and the police seized the plants and other evidence of the grow operation from Kirchoff's house.

At trial, Kirchoff moved to have the evidence obtained from the search suppressed. It was denied, and he was convicted. He appealed to the state's Supreme Court. (Note: Vermont has no intermediate appellate courts) The case was not argued until 1989, and it took an additional two years for the court to decide.

In early 1991 the Supreme Court issued its decision, holding 4–1 that the evidence should have been suppressed. After reviewing the facts of the case, Justice James L. Morse conceded that the search was lawful under Oliver. However, the court went on to note that it had to consider whether the search complied with Article 11 of the state constitution, which while substantially similar to the Fourth Amendment did have some differences in wording. Most significantly, it referred to a person's "possessions" as coming under its purview rather than just their "effects".

Did that mean it applied to all a person's landholdings, Morse asked? The minimal records from the state's original constitutional debates did not offer much guidance, so he looked at how other states with similar language had addressed the issue. They had divided on the issue, yet at the same time states that used "effects" in their constitutions had held it applied more broadly than Oliver had held.

"Our decision, however, need not rest on the drafters' choice of one word over another", Morse wrote. "Even if we cannot say with confidence that the scope of the term 'possessions' mandates a right of privacy in real estate, it certainly does not rule out such a right." He noted that this interpretation was at odds with Oliver, and said the fault lay with the Oliver Court, which had "misinterpreted its own Fourth Amendment precedent."

In Oliver, the Supreme Court had seemed "to equate privacy with crime", which Morse considered flawed. "If one assumes at the outset that people will only seek privacy in the use of their land for criminal purposes," he wrote, "the conclusion that society will not recognize a claim to privacy in the land readily follows. But we cannot presume how an individual will employ private lands—that is the nature of privacy." Oliver's association of privacy and criminality, according to Morse, was an ipse dixit.

Morse accepted the Oregon Supreme Court's rule in Dixson that the open-fields doctrine did not apply where a landowner had, like Kirchoff, taken affirmative measures to control access to their land. He grounded this in state constitutional and statutory provisions that allowed public use of unposted land for many outdoor recreational activities and limited the liability of landowners for damages suffered by those they allowed, even implicitly, to engage in those activities on unposted land. "These provisions evidence the state's policy of providing the public with certain privileges and liberties not permitted under the common law", he wrote. "They evidence no intent, however, to limit the right of landowners to pursue their affairs free from unregulated intrusion by officials."

Lastly, Morse said that while the Vermont Supreme Court was not completely discarding Katz as the basis for its personalty-rooted concept of privacy, it found some issues doing so. It was not comfortable with the concept of a reasonable expectation, since that could too easily change "with political winds and the perceived exigencies of the day ... The question is not what society is prepared to accept but what the constitution requires." This formulation, Morse believed, would better protect people's privacy expectations as technology advanced. Lastly he placed the burden of proof on the state in cases where a search such as the one in the instant case, was challenged as unconstitutional, and held that under that standard this search had violated the state constitution.

There were two other opinions. District Judge Lewis Springer, specially assigned to sit on the court for this case due to a vacant seat, concurred but said the majority opinion should have more thoroughly grounded its arguments in the state's constitutional history rather than the federal constitution. Louis P. Peck, in one of his last opinions before retirement, dissented at length, attacking and ridiculing the majority for judicial activism in an opinion rife with cultural and literary references.

==== Dissent ====
"I am sadly disappointed, and frustrated beyond comfort", by the majority opinion, Peck began. He likened it to a brief for the defendant in the case. "[I]t is, in my judgment, one of the most result-oriented opinions I have ever been exposed to. I am not prepared to countenance in silence the extreme and unwarranted judicial activism of which the opinion is an example."

Peck suggested that the majority's confusion over the meaning of "possessions" in the state constitution was "a calculated tactic rather than the result of interpretive incompetency ... Disregarding a word because it may have different meanings in different contexts constitutes an argument weak to the point of absurdity." By doing so, he charged, the majority had been able to substitute its own meaning. If that had not been the plan, "I am afraid that the majority's training in elementary logic, if any, failed to penetrate or make a lasting impression. The[ir] reasoning is a syllogistic blunder and a non sequitur."

There was no constitutional problem presented by the case, Peck said; the state's existing laws were enough protection for landowners.

For all realistic and practical purposes, the sole beneficiary of today's decision is the owner of open fields who conducts criminal activity thereon in defiance of the law. In short, the majority has given birth to a right of privacy to commit crime. If our marijuana farmers have the good sense I think they have, they will soon be busy as little bees putting up no-trespassing signs, while laughing up their sleeves at the gullible naivete of the cooperative majority.

The insistence that police needed a warrant to search any posted or fenced land due to the state's trespass laws was, Peck wrote, "like saying a police cruiser, in responding to an emergency call, may not exceed the speed limit because there are laws against speeding."

Returning to the majority's apparent confusion over the meaning of "possessions", Peck said it was insulting to the framers of the Vermont Constitution to suggest that they "simply tossed in words willy-nilly with no intent that they have any particular meaning; merely filling in blanks, as it were, with the first word that came to mind." He believed that they chose their words carefully and would not have expected the level of protection the court was giving landowners.

Peck also called the majority's holding that the search was unconstitutional "a grossly unfair example of police-bashing", that he himself took personally.

The police are not psychic. At the time they entered the open fields portion of defendant's property, they had no way of knowing or of anticipating that this Court would follow, sheep-like, the decision of one of the most activist-oriented among the state courts, (Note: Dixson) or that we would reject a contrary decision by the high court of a state which borders us and is far more similar to us in size and other characteristics than the former (Note: Peck was referring to State v. Linder, in which the Supreme Court of neighboring New Hampshire had five years previously held the open-fields doctrine applied in that state.) ... I would remind the majority, as it sheds its tears for the defendant, that the entry was not arbitrary. It was not an afternoon of sport for the police, on the off-chance they might just happen to stumble on marijuana or some other contraband, in much the same spirit that we hunt deer and other game. The entry was undertaken in reliance on a "tip"; with every reason to believe the search was legitimate, and it was done in good faith.

Peck feared that the majority's decision would unnecessarily handicap the state's police in preventing crime. He accused it of "cho[osing] the possible prestige with which it may be honored by law reviews and other constitutional activists among the courts, and legal writers, to a recognition of the rights of the individual inhabitants of the State of Vermont." At the very least, the majority should have held the issue to be decided on a case-by-case basis rather than establishing a blanket rule.

=== People v. Scott ===
People v. Scott
- Court: New York Court of Appeals
- Full case name: People of the State of New York v. Guy Scott
- Decided: April 2, 1992
- Citation: 79 N.Y.2d 474

Case history
- Prior actions: Conviction affirmed, 169 A.D.2d 1023 (1991)
- Appealed from: New York Supreme Court, Appellate Division, 3rd Dept.

Court membership
- Judges sitting: Kaye, Alexander, Titone, Hancock, Bellacosa, Wachtler, Simone

Case opinions
- Decision by: Hancock
- Concurrence: Kaye
- Dissent: Bellacosa

Keywords
- search; seizure

As the Dixson appeal was being considered by the Oregon courts, across the country, a hunter pursuing a wounded deer onto posted private property in Preston, New York, came across what appeared to him to be the remnants of a marijuana growing operation. In July 1988, he returned, and confirmed his suspicions, finding about 50 cannabis plants being grown on the site, guarded by an armed man. He reported this to the state police, who asked him to bring back a leaf from one of the plants. The next month he did, and after testifying in camera he returned with a detective.

Guy Scott, owner of the 165 acres (67 ha) on which the marijuana was growing, was arrested and charged with first-degree criminal possession of marijuana, a felony, after 200 plants were seized. At trial in Chenango County Court, he moved to suppress the evidence against him as seized unconstitutionally. After the court ruled that it had not been, Scott pleaded guilty and appealed the conviction on the same grounds, arguing that by posting the property's bounds at 20–30-foot (6.1–9.1 m) intervals he had secured a reasonable expectation of privacy.

Following Oliver, a five-justice panel of the Third Department of the state's Appellate Division unanimously rejected that argument in 1991. "The marihuana in question here", it wrote, "was clearly grown in an open, uncultivated field away from the curtilage of any residential structure; thus, defendant had no legitimate expectation of privacy." Scott appealed to the Court of Appeals, New York's highest court.

In 1992, Judge Stewart Hancock wrote for the majority in a 4–3 decision reversing the appellate court and Scott's conviction that rejected the open-fields doctrine. Like Marshall and Oregon's Dixson court, he found Oliver's recourse to a property-based privacy interest at odds with Katz's reasonable expectation test. But that would have little bearing as the majority found New York's constitution, "with its own unique history", more relevant to the issues raised by Scott's case.

Prior to 1938 New York, Hancock noted, had restricted searches and seizures only at the statutory level. When the state constitution was amended that year, in addition to language similar to that of the Fourth Amendment that had long been in the statute, it included a provision explicitly including telecommunications under the same warrant requirements, a reaction to the U.S. Supreme Court's Olmstead case a decade earlier, which had held that police did not need a warrant for wiretapping telephones since that took place far from the property of those communicating over them. Therefore, according to Hancock, it did not follow that the state constitution should or could be interpreted in the same way the Oliver Court had interpreted the federal constitution.

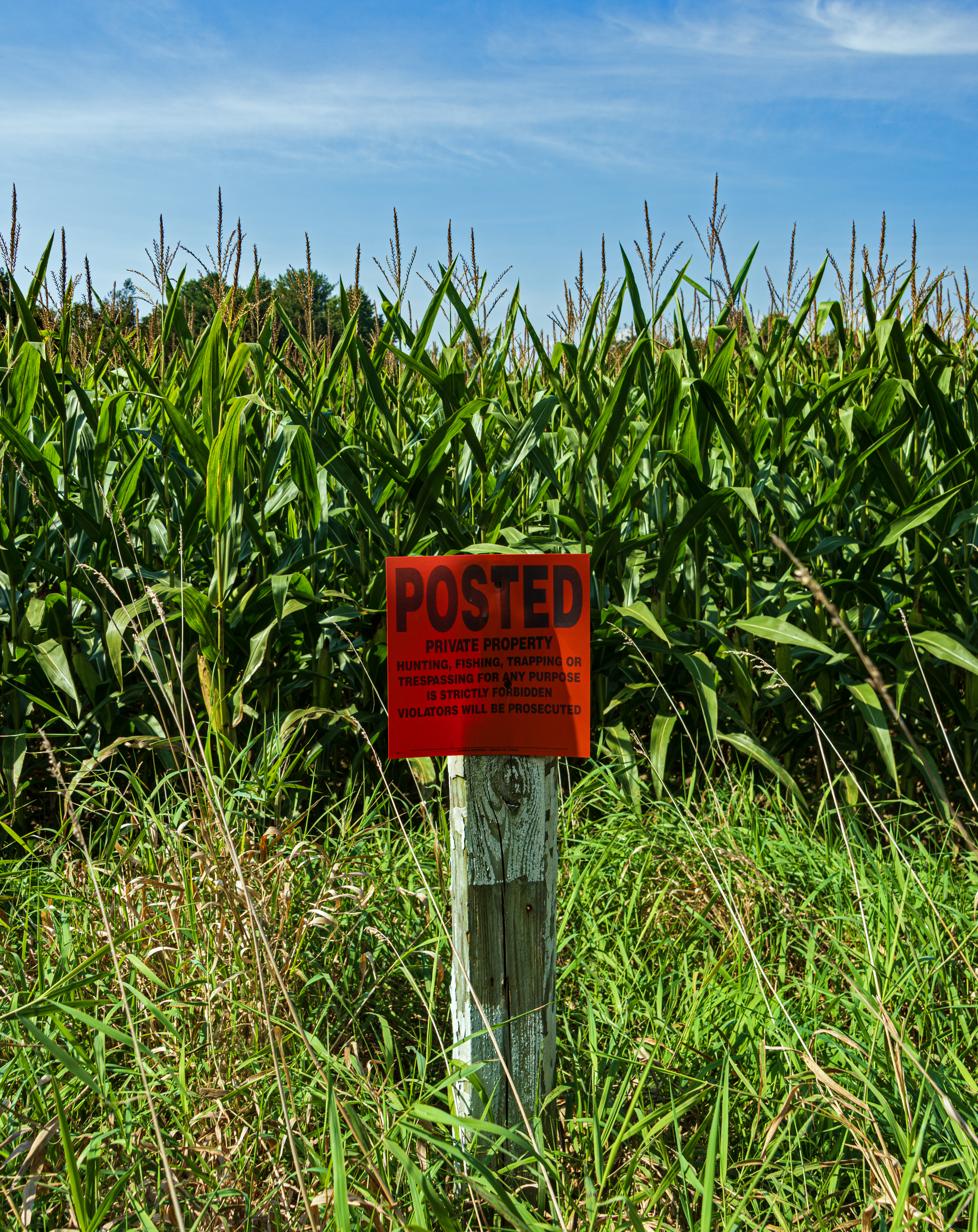
A posted cornfield in New York

Hancock turned to the second part of the Katz test: whether Scott's interest in his privacy asserted by posting his property was objectively reasonable. The Oliver majority had dismissed the idea, pointing instead to social consensus as where to look, but, the judge wrote:

We believe that under the law of this State the citizens are entitled to more protection. A constitutional rule which permits State agents to invade private lands for no reason at all — without permission and in outright disregard of the owner's efforts to maintain privacy by fencing or posting signs — is one that we cannot accept as adequately preserving fundamental rights of New York citizens.

While Hancock conceded that property rights do not automatically create a privacy interest, his review of the state's statutory and case law convinced him that, in interpreting both state and federal law on this issue, the state's courts had constantly followed the Katz concept of rooting privacy in the person, rather than property. He also shared Marshall's observation that the Oliver majority had suggested that a reasonable expectation of privacy depended on what the landowner intended to shield from view by posting or fencing the land:

The reasoning of the ... majority, seems, to be this, in effect: that law-abiding persons should have nothing to hide on their property and, thus, there can be no reasonable objection to the State's unpermitted entry on posted or fenced land to conduct a general search for contraband. But this presupposes the ideal of a conforming society, a concept which seems foreign to New York's tradition of tolerance of the unconventional and of what may appear bizarre or even offensive.

Judge Joseph Bellacosa's dissent, addressing not only Scott but a companion case in which the court had ruled evidence gathered in warrantless administrative searches of businesses to be inadmissible, focused largely on what he considered to be the majority's faulty reasoning for departing from Oliver. In a similar case of a rural marijuana grower four years earlier, (Note: People v. Reynolds, 71 N.Y.2d 552 (N.Y. 1988).) he noted, the court had accepted evidence gathered by an aerial search and declined to consider the same privacy issues that defendant had raised. The majority responded that in that case she had not raised the issue of her land being posted.

=== State v. Johnson ===
State v. Johnson
- Court: Washington Court of Appeals, Division Two
- Full case name: State of Washington v. Tamara Sue Johnson and James Raymond Johnson
- Decided: September 7, 1994
- Citation: 75 Wn. App. 692, 879 P.2d 984

Case history
- Prior action: criminal trial
- Appealed from: Thurston County Superior Court
- Appealed to: Washington Supreme Court
- Subsequent actions: Review denied, 126 Wn.2d 1004 (1995)

Court membership
- Judges sitting: Alexander, Morgan and Houghton

Case opinions
- Alexander
- Decision by: Alexander

Keywords
- search; seizure

Again, as Scott was reaching the New York Court of Appeals, another marijuana growing investigation across the country again gave rise to a state court's rejection of the open-fields doctrine. This case involved the additional question of whether federal involvement negated any state consideration of the issue.

In 1991 agents of the federal Drug Enforcement Administration (DEA) received a tip that a "Jim Johnson" was growing marijuana on his property near Scott Lake. The two took this information to the Thurston County Narcotics Task Force, and a detective helped them confirm that a man by that name lived in the area, and found his address. However, the only way to reach the property was via a dirt road that ran through Millersylvania State Park.

The three went down the road but found it gated, fenced and posted at the property line, and they chose at that time not to pass it, unable to see any evidence of marijuana being grown from where they were. At the DEA agents' request, the county officers flew over the property and took photographs. Several days later the DEA agents returned, without the local detective, in the middle of the night. This time they passed the gate and walked 200 yards (180 m) to a barn, with a house visible about 75–100 yards (69–91 m) beyond, where they smelled growing cannabis plants and heard the sounds of machinery they associated with such cultivation operations. They completed their investigation by aiming a thermal imaging device at the barn; its results further confirmed their suspicion. After finding from local utility records that the property's electricity consumption also matched the profile of a growing operation, they got a warrant and arrested both Johnson and his wife.

Although the DEA had gathered most of the evidence against them, the couple were prosecuted in state court. They sought unsuccessfully to suppress that evidence, but the trial court held that the DEA had largely been acting independently of the state, making the evidence admissible under the open-fields doctrine. The court convicted them in a bench trial and they appealed.

The Washington Court of Appeals first reconsidered the trial court's ruling that the DEA acted without the cooperation or assistance of the state, which under the silver platter doctrine would have protected it from being challenged under the state constitution. Judge Gerry Alexander rejected the state's argument that the local officers had only provided the DEA with locally relevant information, noting that a county detective had accompanied the DEA agents on one trip, the aerial surveillance and the involvement of local law enforcement in the arrest. And since the state was so involved, the court could consider whether the evidence was gathered in violation of the state constitution.

Washington's equivalent to the Fourth Amendment, Article I, Section 7, is unlike New York and Oregon's very differently worded from its federal counterpart: "No person shall be disturbed in his private affairs, or his home invaded, without authority of law." It had thus, Alexander wrote, been held repeatedly to offer broader protection to privacy rights. (Note: In a 1984 case upholding the conviction of a marijuana grower based on warrantless aerial surveillance, Washington's Supreme Court had rejected the open-fields doctrine in dictum for this reason, but did not find it necessarily to rule on that question since it was not dispositive of the case.)

The state had argued that the DEA agents had, by using an accessway to the house, complied with that provision, citing several precedents where searches had been upheld where police used routes for the public to approach a residence. But Alexander distinguished them from the instant case by noting that "here ... [the agents] were using it as the most convenient route on which to trespass on the Johnsons' property" instead of trying to reach the house and speak with its occupants; the fact that the agents intruded late at night in one argued against that, the judge observed. The posting, fencing and gate also indicated that "the Johnsons withdrew any permission that arguably may be implied for the DEA agents to use the accessway, especially at 1 a.m."

Alexander conceded that the barn was not within the curtilage of the house, but again felt that was outweighed by the visible measures the Johnsons had taken to exclude the public from their property. This was not just an issue of privacy, Alexander noted, but the safety of law enforcement. Justice Thurgood Marshall's dissent in Oliver had noted that many rural landowners resorted to "self-help", as he put it, when faced with trespassers, and the DEA agents' furtive nocturnal visit to the Johnsons' barn could have resulted in violence. "We conclude that the agents' entry onto the Johnsons' property was an unreasonable intrusion into the Johnsons' private affairs", Alexander wrote. Since the remaining untainted evidence submitted to obtain the search warrant was thus insufficient to establish probable cause, the Johnsons' convictions were reversed with directions to dismiss the charges. The state Supreme Court declined to review the case the next year.

=== State v. Bullock ===
State v. Bullock
- Court: Montana Supreme Court
- Full case name: State of Montana v. Bill Bullock and Eddie Peterson
- Decided: August 4, 1995
- Citation: 901 P.2d 61

Case history
- Prior actions: criminal trial and appeal
- Appealed from: District Court for the Tenth Judicial District

Court membership
- Judges sitting: Trieweiler, Turnage, Nelson, Gray, Hunt, Weber and Leaphart

Case opinions
- Trieweiler
- Decision by: Triweiler

Keywords
- search; seizure

Contemporaneously with Johnson, another case involving the open-fields doctrine began working its way through Montana's state courts. Unlike its state and federal predecessors, it involved illegally taken game rather than marijuana cultivation.

In October 1991, Chuck Wing, a Boulder, Montana, man, saw a six- or seven-point bull elk on a hill as he was returning from work. He knew that these elk could only be taken by hunters with special permits in that area. As he was watching he saw two men shoot the elk and put it in their truck, which he knew belonged to a man named Eddie Peterson, without field dressing it. Wing reported it to Jefferson County Sheriff Tom Dawson, which in turn passed the information to the state Department of Fish, Wildlife and Parks (MFWP).

Chris Anderson, an MFWP game warden came from nearby Helena to Boulder the next morning and interviewed Wing. Anderson learned that Peterson lived in nearby Basin Creek, and he and Dawson drove to his cabin, down a 7-mile (11 km) one-lane Forest Service road bordered by private property in some stretches, with signs advising the public to stay on the road. At Peterson's house, the gate to his driveway was open, and the sheriff and game warden drove past an open gate, with "No trespassing" signs on either side, down a 334-foot (102 m) road to Peterson's cabin, which he had in the past moved behind a rise in the land so that it would not be visible from the road.

Anderson and Dawson saw an elk carcass hanging from a tree roughly 125 feet (38 m) from Peterson's cabin, likewise invisible from the road or adjoining property. Anderson asked where the elk had been killed, and Peterson took the two there, but while there were some of the animal's innards there were no tracks. Anderson believed the elk had been taken somewhere else, and told Peterson what Wing had told Dawson about seeing the day before.

Peterson continued to insist that the elk had been taken on his property, which Anderson did not believe. Bill Bullock, who was also on the property, attempted to corroborate Peterson's account even when offered immunity from prosecution if he told Anderson what the game warden believed had actually happened. The next day Anderson returned to the property and confiscated the elk. Peterson was charged with unlawfully killing a game animal and Bullock with possessing an unlawfully killed game animal.

The two men's trial took most of the next year. In February 1992 the county Justice Court granted their motion to suppress all the evidence that Anderson and Dawson had obtained when they went on Peterson's property, dismissing entirely the case against Bullock in the process. The state appealed to District Court, and asked for a new trial; the defendants in turn asked that the charges be dismissed because they were misdemeanors and more than six months had elapsed since they had been charged. After that motion was denied, they pleaded guilty and, in October, appealed to the Montana Supreme Court.

The Supreme Court sent the case back down for evidentiary hearings and imposition of sentence, proceedings that took place over the next two years. After they had been held, the justices heard arguments in early 1995 and rendered their decision in August. They considered three issues: the delay in trying the men, whether Bullock had standing to challenge the evidence against him obtained from the warrantless search of Bullock's property, and whether the state constitution's privacy provisions precluded the open-fields doctrine.

On the first question, Justice Terry N. Trieweiler held for a unanimous court that the six-month deadline had not been passed due to the state's appeal that granted a trial de novo, and even so the delay had not been presumptively prejudicial. The next question was resolved in Bullock's favor as the court held that its own prior precedent, and a similar case from New Jersey, (Note: New Jersey v. Alston, 88 N.J. 211 (N.J. 1981).) that anyone charged with an offense alleging possession of something automatically has standing to challenge the seizure and any evidence derived from it, regardless of another recent U.S. Supreme Court decision that had narrowed the scope of a similar longstanding rule of its own. (Note: United States v. Salvucci, 440 U.S. 83 (1980))

Having established that both defendants had standing to challenge the state's evidence as unconstitutionally gathered, Trieweiler turned to that final question. Since the U.S. Supreme Court's recent decisions on the open-fields doctrine had revealed "what appear to be seeming inconsistencies", he believed it was proper for the court to reconsider whether it was good law in Montana. After retracing its history at the federal level, Triweiler turned to the state's cases, where cases that had upheld the doctrine after Katz but before Oliver and Dunn had upheld it. He believed that the instant case, however, could be "factually distinguished" from those precedents, where the court had not considered the defendants' expectations of privacy over their open fields to be reasonable due to the circumstances of those cases.

Precedent also held that while the language of Article II, Section 11, in the Montana Constitution was, like the corresponding provisions of New York and Oregon's, similar to the Fourth Amendment, it guaranteed broader protections against unlawful search and seizure. Trieweiler looked at the Oregon, New York and Washington cases. He found that the common element was that the defendants had taken steps to exclude all members of the public save those they invited onto the land, by posting, fencing or otherwise limiting access to the property.

"We conclude that in Montana a person may have an expectation of privacy in an area of land that is beyond the curtilage which the society of this State is willing to recognize as reasonable, and that where that expectation is evidenced by fencing, 'No Trespassing,' or similar signs, or 'by some other means [which] indicate[s] unmistakably that entry is not permitted'", Trieweiler wrote, quoting Scott. He explicitly excluded cases, such as some of the precedents he had discussed, where law enforcement had observed the illegal activity from adjoining public property, but declared that to the extent those cases relied on the open-fields doctrine they were overruled.

Having rejected the open-fields doctrine for Montana courts as a general principle, Trieweiler turned to its applicability to the instant case. He noted that not only had Peterson posted the property and placed a gate at the entrance road, he had some years beforehand moved his cabin to a less visible location after repeated vandalism. On previous visits, law enforcement had requested his permission to come on the property. "The entry onto Peterson's property and observation of the elk carcass, which could not have otherwise been observed, was an unreasonable search in violation of Article II, Section 11, of the Montana Constitution", Triweiler concluded.

Trieweiler rejected the state's argument that Peterson's offer to lead Anderson and Dawson to the purported kill site and permission for them to examine the elk constituted sufficient consent to allow the carcass into evidence as those actions only took place after the sheriff and warden had already trespassed far enough on to the property to see the carcass. The court affirmed the district court's denial of the defendants' motion to dismiss, but overruled its decision not to suppress the evidence from the search.

=== State v. Stietz ===
State v. Stietz
- Court: Wisconsin Supreme Court
- Full case name: State v. Robert Joseph Stietz
- Decided: June 13, 2017
- Citation: 895 N.W.2d 796, 375 Wis.2d 572, 2017 WI 58

Case history
- Prior action: Criminal trial
- Appealed from: Wisconsin Court of Appeals

Court membership
- Judges sitting: Abrahamson, Grassl Bradley, Kelly, Roggensack, Ziegler, Gableman

Case opinions
- Trial court erred in not permitting self-defense jury instruction in prosecution of farmer for armed confrontation with DNR game wardens on his property where they could not and did not clearly identify themselves as wardens and could have been seen by him as trespassers. Appeals court reversed and remanded
- Decision by: Abrahamson
- Concurrence: Bradley, Kelly, Roggensack
- Dissent: Ziegler, Gableman

Keywords
- search; seizure; self-defense; trespass

... [I]mportant practical considerations suggest that the police should not be empowered to invade land closed to the public. In many parts of the country, landowners feel entitled to use self-help in expelling trespassers from their posted property. There is thus a serious risk that police officers, making unannounced, warrantless searches of 'open fields,' will become involved in violent confrontations with irate landowners ...

The scenario Justice Marshall feared in his Oliver dissent came to pass in Lafayette County, Wisconsin, in 2012. Near sunset on the last Sunday of November, the last day of the state's firearm deer season, Robert Stietz, a cattle and mushroom farmer, went to patrol a detached 25-acre (10 ha) parcel of his land off state Highway 81 for illegal hunters and vandals, both of which he had had problems with in the past. He carried both his rifle and a pistol, and drove to the property in his wife's sedan since he did not expect to be bringing a deer carcass home. For the same reason, he wore camouflage and no blaze orange.

At the same time, unbeknownst to Stietz, two game wardens with the state's Department of Natural Resources were patrolling the area in their vehicle, looking for hunters who might be trying to take a deer after the official end of the season, 20 minutes after sunset, which that day was 4:45 p.m. Just before 5, they found the sedan parked alongside the highway. In it they observed an open and empty gun case, a bottle of scent-killing spray and a camouflage tree seat, all of which led them to deduce that the occupant of the car was probably hunting. The car's registration came back to Stietz when they checked it on their vehicle's computer.

The wardens decided to investigate. They parked their pickup truck, put on their own blaze orange jackets, on which their departmental insignia was not as conspicuous as it had been on their uniform shirts, and found the open cattle gate leading on to Stietz's property. Shortly after they passed it, Stietz himself saw them and approached them, believing from the blaze orange jackets that they were possibly trespassing hunters.

At trial, the wardens testified that they identified themselves as such upon seeing Stietz; he in turn said they did not do so clearly enough for him to hear and believed they were asking if he was a warden or had seen any. The wardens asked how many deer he had seen that day; after Stietz said he had seen seven does but was not at the time hunting, he testified that one of the men threw up his arms and seemed upset, which led him to further believe they might be trespassing.

Noticing that the wardens seemed to be trying to interpose themselves between him and his car, Stietz said, he began to feel fearful. One asked him if his rifle was loaded; when Stietz confirmed that it was the other asked him for it, several times, leading Stietz to believe he was being attacked. The two wardens then attempted to take the rifle, leading to a physical struggle between them and Stietz. When they regained their feet, one of the wardens pulled his handgun and pointed it at Stietz, who in turn did the same, followed by the other warden.

One of the wardens made a radio call for backup, at which point Stietz said later that he began to realize who they really were and relax slightly. He kept his gun pointed at the wardens, he testified, because they refused to lower theirs. Eventually deputy sheriffs came and, after assuring Stietz he would not be "gang tackled", took him into custody.

Stietz faced six felony charges over the incident. At trial in March 2014, the jury convicted him of two: intentionally pointing a firearm at a law enforcement officer and resisting an officer with a dangerous weapon. His pretrial motions for jury instructions on self-defense, trespass, and violation of his right to keep and bear arms were denied, as were his post-trial motions for acquittal or a new trial.

In May Stietz was sentenced to a year in prison and probation. The day of sentence, he filed his appeal, arguing the denial of his jury instructions constituted fatal error. In an unpublished 2016 per curiam opinion, the appeals court upheld the conviction.

Stietz appealed to the Wisconsin Supreme Court. It accepted the case in late 2016 and heard oral arguments early the next year. In June 2017, by a 4–2 margin, (Note: Justice Ann Walsh Bradley did not participate.) the court held that the trial court's denial of Stietz's requested self-defense instruction had deprived him of a factual credible argument that the jury could have believed and reversed and remanded the appeals court.

Justice Shirley Abrahamson's majority opinion declined to address the proposed trespass instruction since she believed Stietz might well prevail on retrial with just the self-defense instruction. But the state had raised the open-fields doctrine in its briefs on the case, which led Justice Rebecca Bradley to write a concurrence, joined in its entirety by Justice Daniel Kelly and partially by Chief Justice Patience D. Roggensack, (Note: Roggensack did not join Part II of Bradley's concurrence, which dealt with the open-fields doctrine.) which argued that Stietz had a constitutional right to raise the trespass issue and that not allowing him to do so violated that right. She also was sharply critical of the open-fields doctrine as used to justify the evidence behind the arrest.

In her arguments that the trespass instruction should have been permitted, Bradley had noted that at oral argument the state was unable to cite any statutory authority for the wardens' presence on Stietz's property, (Note: Wisconsin law permits wardens to enter private property without permission or reasonable suspicion only to collect animal carcasses and prevent the spread of disease, none were present or argued to be. The state also argued that the wardens were executing a Terry stop, but those can only be constitutional on public land) nor evidence that they had Stietz's permission. She did not believe the parked car constituted reasonable suspicion of illegal hunting that would have allowed them to enter the property, either. And he had put up clear signals—the posting, gating and fencing of the property—that no one was to come on that property without his permission.

In the absence of those more specific justifications, the state had cited the open-fields doctrine as to how the wardens' uninvited presence on public land was legal. "The state is wrong", Bradley wrote. "The open fields doctrine does not transform private fields into public places that anyone is free to enter uninvited or without reason. Nor does it convert the act of trespassing into a lawful intrusion." It existed, she asserted, only to prevent the suppression of evidence gathered by intrusions into the areas it covered, and could not be extended to justify Stietz's arrest. "The open fields exception to the Fourth Amendment's warrant requirement was not intended to eliminate property owners' rights by sanctioning entry onto open land at any time for any reason, or no reason at all", she reiterated, citing Bullock, Dixson, Johnson and Scott in a footnote.

Dissenting justice Annette Ziegler wrote for herself and Michael Gableman. She primarily took issue with the majority opinion, primarily arguing that the wardens did have reasonable suspicion and legal authority to enter the property. She touched on the open-field doctrine only to note that the appeals court had held it applicable, and Stietz had not raised it on his appeal to the Supreme Court.

Following the decision, Assemblyman Adam Jarchow and State Senator Dave Craig introduced a bill that would require that DNR wardens have reasonable suspicion of a law being broken before entering private property without the owner's consent. "Preventing poaching is somehow so important we allow DNR incursions on private property for any reason under the sun or no reason at all", Jarchow complained. "[S]omething is seriously out of whack here." It was vigorously opposed by wildlife conservation organizations such as the League of Conservation Voters and the state Sierra Club chapter, who feared that it would severely hamper the wardens' ability to do their jobs, and was never brought to a vote.

In his 2018 retrial, Stietz pleaded no contest to a single count of restricting or obstructing an officer and was sentenced to time served. The following year, he filed suit in federal court for the Western District of Wisconsin against the two wardens, alleging they violated his rights under the Second and Fourth amendments. It was dismissed in July 2020 for failure to state a claim; the court further found the DNR wardens entitled to qualified immunity.

== See also ==
- United States v. Burton, 894 F.2d 188 (6th Cir.), cert. denied, 498 U.S. 857 (1990)
- United States v. Pace, 955 F.2d 270 (5th Cir.), cert. denied, 502 U.S. 883 (1992)
- Husband v. Bryan, 946 F.2d 27 (5th Cir. 1991)
- United States v. Benish, 5 F.3d 20 (3d Cir. 1993)
- United States v. McKeever, 5 F.3d 863 (5th Cir. 1993)
- United States v. Brady, 993 F.2d 177 (9th Cir. 1993)
- United States v. Depew, 8 F.3d 424 (9th Cir. 1993)
- United States v. Reilly, 76 F.3d 1271 (2d Cir. 1996)
- Kyllo v. United States, 533 U.S. 27 (2001)
