= David V. Brewer =

American judge (born 1951)

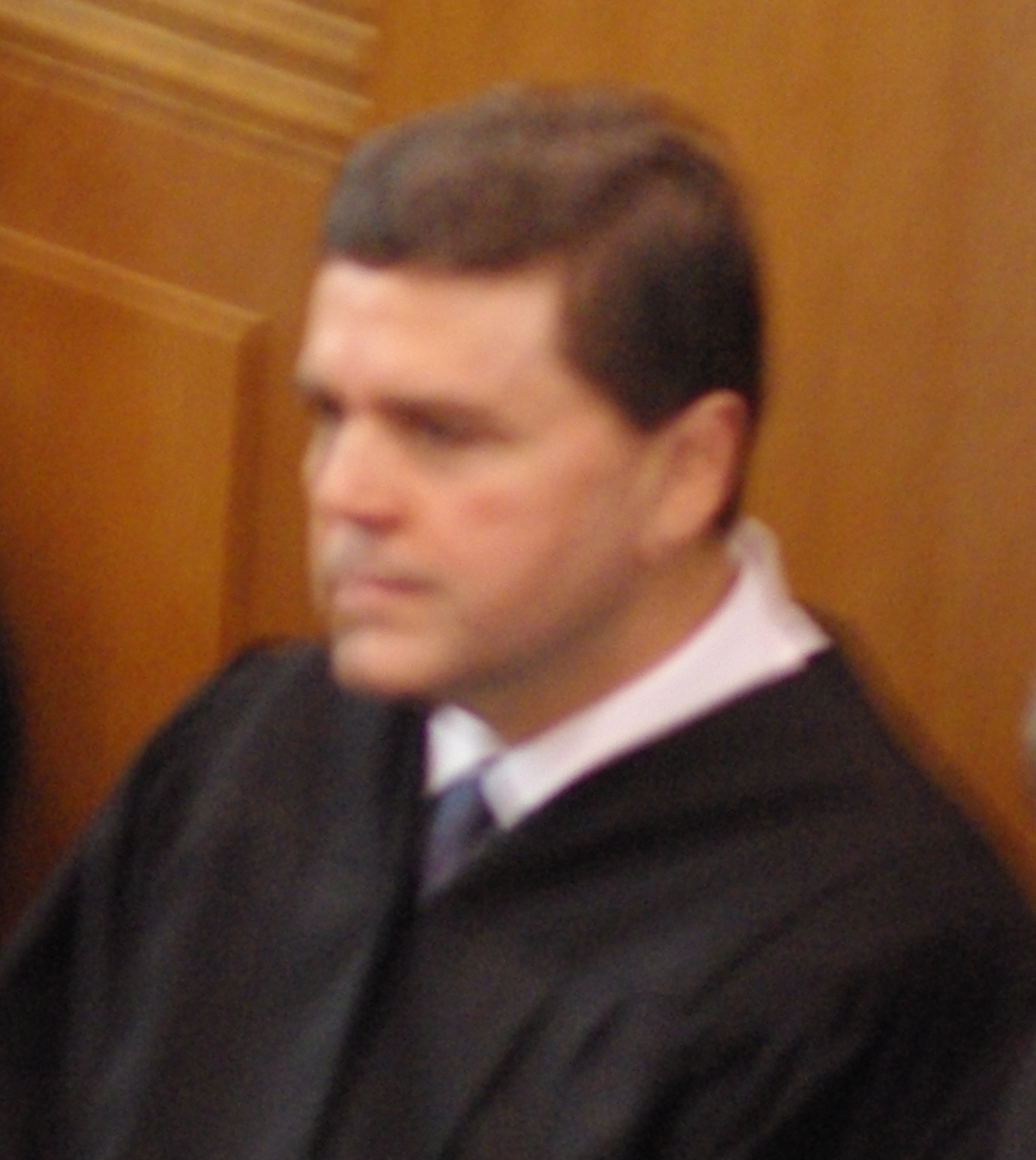

Justice of the Oregon Supreme Court
- In office 2013–2017
- Preceded by: Paul De Muniz
- Succeeded by: Rebecca Duncan

Chief Judge Oregon Court of Appeals
- In office 2004–2012
- Preceded by: Mary J. Deits
- Succeeded by: Rick Haselton

Personal details
- Born: 1951 (age 74–75) Modesto, California, United States
- Education: Sonoma State University, BA, 1974; University of Oregon School of Law, JD, 1977
- Occupation: Judge

David V. Brewer (born 1951) is an American lawyer and judge, who served as a justice of the Oregon Supreme Court from 2013 to 2017. He retired on June 30, 2017, and was succeeded by Rebecca Duncan.

Brewer was the Chief Judge of the Oregon Court of Appeals from 2004 to 2012. He was a judge on the Lane County Circuit Court from 1994 to 2000.

Brewer graduated from the University of Oregon School of Law in 1977. He was an attorney and partner at Lombard, Gardner, Honsowetz & Brewer in Eugene, Oregon, from 1978 to 1993, and President of the Lane County Bar Association from 1991 to 1992.

Legal offices
Preceded by Paul De Muniz	Justice of the Oregon Supreme Court; 2013–2017	Succeeded by Rebecca Duncan
Preceded by Mary J. Deits	Chief Judge of the Oregon Court of Appeals; 2004–2013	Succeeded by Rick Haselton
