= Robert D. Durham =

American judge

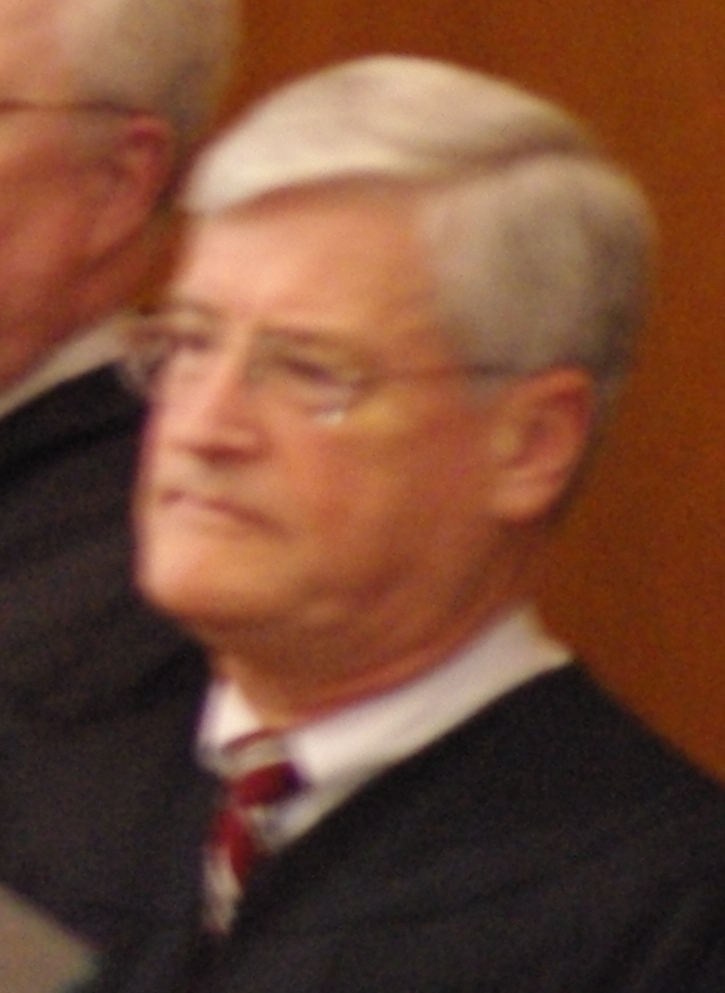
- Durham in 2009

91st Justice of the Oregon Supreme Court
- In office 1994–2013
- Appointed by: Barbara Roberts
- Preceded by: Edwin J. Peterson
- Succeeded by: Richard C. Baldwin

Judge of the Oregon Court of Appeals
- In office 1991–1994
- Appointed by: Barbara Roberts
- Preceded by: Jonathan Newman
- Succeeded by: Rick Haselton

Personal details
- Born: May 10, 1947 (age 78) Lynwood, California, U.S.

Robert Donald "Skip" Durham Jr. (born May 10, 1947) is a retired justice of the Oregon Supreme Court. Previously, Durham was a judge for the Oregon Court of Appeals and a lawyer in private practice.

== Education ==
Durham's post-secondary education began at Whittier College located in Whittier, California. At Whittier he played first base on the baseball team and was a lineman on the football team. He graduated in 1969 with a Bachelor of Arts degree. Justice Durham then attended the University of Santa Clara School of Law, graduating with his J.D. in 1972. After graduation he served as a law clerk to Oregon Supreme Court justice Dean F. Bryson from 1972 to 1974. Lastly, he earned an LL.M. in 1998 from the University of Virginia School of Law.

== Legal career ==
Durham was in private practice in Oregon from 1974 to 1991 working in Portland and Eugene. He served as chairperson of the Oregon State Bar's labor law section in 1984, and as chairperson of the Oregon Commission on Administrative Hearings from 1989 to 1990. He is a partner in Bennett & Durham in Portland, previously the firm was known as Kulongoski, Durham, Drummonds & Colombo.

== Judicial career ==
Robert Durham's career in the judiciary began when he was appointed to the Oregon Court of Appeals by the governor on November 19, 1991. Subsequently, he was elected to a full term in 1992, but resigned from the court before the end of his term upon his appointment to the state supreme court. Also in 1992, he served as a faculty at the National Judicial College. From 1992 to 1994 and again from 1996 through 2005 Durham was a member on the Oregon Council on Court Procedures.

Justice Durham was appointed by Oregon Governor Barbara Roberts to the Oregon Supreme Court to replace the retiring Edwin J. Peterson.

His appointment on January 4, 1994, made him the 91st justice since Oregon became a territory in 1848. Durham was then elected to a full six-year term in 1994 and re-elected in 2000 and 2006. He did not seek re-election in 2012. While on the court Durham served as a member of the Oregon Rules of Appellate Procedure Committee from 1994 to 2001, president of the Oregon Appellate Judges Association from 1996 to 1997, and twice as chairperson of the Oregon Supreme Court Committee on Judicial Rule 4 (1995–1996 & 2002–2005).

== Other ==
Durham is a member of the Board of Directors for Oregon Law Institute of Lewis & Clark Law School, the Multnomah County and Marion County Bar Associations, and a master at the Willamette Valley American Inns of Court, Master. He serves as an instructor of Judicial Ethics, Judicial Campaign Practices and Transition Issues. Durham also volunteers for the Classroom Law Project and as a mentor at Willamette University College of Law.
