= Robyn Aoyagi =

Oregon Court of Appeals judge

Judge on the Oregon Court of Appeals
- Incumbent
- Assumed office 2017
- Appointed by: Kate Brown
- Preceded by: Timothy J. Sercombe

Personal details
- Born: Robyn Ridler c. 1974 (age 51–52) Seattle, Washington
- Education: Tufts University; Harvard Law School
- Occupation: Attorney, jurist

Robyn Aoyagi (born 1974, née Ridler) is an American lawyer and judge on the Oregon Court of Appeals. She was appointed by Governor Kate Brown in 2017.

== Early life and education ==
Aoyagi was born in Seattle, Washington. At age 11, she moved to and was raised in Roswell, New Mexico.

She then attended Tufts University, majoring in English and community health. She graduated magna cum laude in the class of 1995. She continued her education in Boston and attended Harvard Law School. During law school she interned with Massachusetts Public Interest Research Group (MASSPIRG), the U.S. Environmental Protection Agency (Region I), and the United Nations Framework Convention on Climate Change in Bonn, Germany. She graduated cum laude in 1999.

After law school, Aoyagi worked with Judge John M. Steadman on the D.C. Court of Appeals.

== Legal career ==
Aoyagi started work in Portland at Tonkon Torp LLP in 2000. In 2007, she became a partner of that firm. She worked primarily with commercial and appellate cases for the firm. She worked at Tonkon Torp for 17 years before being appointed to the Oregon Court of Appeals. She was the first lawyer from Tonkon Torp to be appointed as a trial or appellate judge.

== Oregon Court of Appeals ==
In 2017 Aoyagi became a judge on the Oregon Court of Appeals. She is the presiding judge for Department 3 of that court. In 2024 she ran for her position and was challenged for her seat. Her opponent resigned his campaign before the election. She is up for re-election in 2030.
