= United States v. Ninety-Five Barrels Alleged Apple Cider Vinegar =

- Supreme Court of the United States

Argued April 10–11, 1924 Decided June 2, 1924
- Full case name: United States v. Ninety-Five Barrels, More or Less, Alleged Apple Cider Vinegar
- Citations: 265 U.S. 438 (more) 44 S. Ct. 529; 68 L. Ed. 1094; 1924 U.S. LEXIS 2623

Case history
- Prior: District Court for the Northern District of Ohio, Eastern Division, granted summary judgment to the state; Circuit Court of Appeals reversed, 289 F. 181; cert. granted, 263 U.S. 695 (1923).

Holding
- A label for "Apple Cider Vinegar Made from Selected Apples" is misleading when that vinegar is made from dried apples, and the vinegar is therefore misbranded under the Food and Drugs Act.

Court membership
- Chief Justice William H. Taft Associate Justices Joseph McKenna · Oliver W. Holmes Jr. Willis Van Devanter · James C. McReynolds; Louis Brandeis · George Sutherland; Pierce Butler · Edward T. Sanford

Case opinion
- Majority: Butler, joined by unanimous

Laws applied
- Food and Drugs Act June 30, 1906, c. 3915, 34 Stat. 768. (Comp. St. 8717 et seq.)

United States v. Ninety-Five Barrels Alleged Apple Cider Vinegar, 265 U.S. 438 (1924), was an in rem case in which the Supreme Court of the United States held that apple cider vinegar is mislabelled when made from rehydrated dried apples, and not "the expressed juice of apples" known as apple cider. Douglas Packing Company's Excelsior and Sun Bright vinegars were the products at issue, and the company responded to the lawsuit.

== Background ==
In the early 1900s, food labeling was not well regulated, and many companies used tricky or dishonest wording on their products. To address this, Congress passed the Pure Food and Drugs Act in 1906, which made it illegal to misbrand or mislabel food and medicine sold in the United States. It gave the federal government the power to take action against companies that used false or misleading labels, even if those labels weren't completely false.

Sometime before 1924 the Douglas Packing Company had shipped ninety-five barrels of apple cider vinegar to St. Louis. The barrels were labeled "Apple Cider Vinegar Made from Selected Apples," which gave the impression that the vinegar was made using whole, fresh apples. However, the vinegar had actually been made from dried apples that had been soaked in water and then fermented. This process created vinegar that was chemically similar to traditional apple cider vinegar, but the ingredients and method were different.

When the U.S. government learned how the vinegar was made, it seized the barrels and filed a lawsuit under the FDCA, claiming that the label was misbranded. The government argued that the wording on the label was misleading to ordinary consumers, who would assume the vinegar came from fresh apples. The vinegar was safe to eat, but the case wasn't about health: it was about honesty and accuracy in labeling. Thus, this case raised the question of whether a food label can violate the law even if the product is safe and the words are technically true. The government argued that it could if the label gave consumers the wrong idea.

In the initial proceedings, the government alleged that the product was both adulterated and misbranded under the Pure Food and Drug Act. The trial court found that adulteration was not proven but that misbranding was. The trial court's decision was appealed and the finding of misbranding was reversed. The appellate court's decision was appealed again, to the supreme court, which ruled unanimously for the government.

The evidence showed that, in addition to water used for rehydration, sulfur dioxide (to prevent rot) and barium carbonate (to later remove the sulfur compound) were used in the manufacturing process for vinegar made from dried apples. Chemical analysis yielded similar results for both kinds of apple-based vinegar, other than traces of barium which were not alleged to be harmful. Other than this and the difference in apples, the manufacturing process was the same. The trial judge, who examined samples of the vinegar at issue and apple cider vinegar made from fresh apples, concluded that there were only slight differences in appearance and taste.

== Supreme Court ==
There was no claim that vinegar from dried apples was of inferior quality. However, the court found that the dried apple vinegar was not identical to apple cider vinegar as commonly understood—a product made from apple cider, itself necessarily derived from fresh ingredients—and was thus misrepresented. Fresh apples contain the apple juice that is normally used in the production of apple cider vinegar, whereas Douglas Packing introduced water which was not part of the original apples, and not specified on the label. Finally, the court found that the claim that it was made from selected apples misled the reader into thinking that the apples were "chosen with special regard to their fitness" for producing vinegar from cider in the customary way, and exacerbated the misrepresentation. These three issues—an imitation under the same name, false or misleading ingredient listing, and misleading labelling—constituted misbranding under the statute.

== Significance ==
The Supreme Court's decision helped clarify how the government can regulate food labels under the Food and Drug Act. The ruling made it clear that a label can be considered misleading even if the words are technically true, especially if it gives consumers a false impression about the product.
