= United States v. Pace =

- Court: United States Court of Appeals for the Fifth Circuit
- Full case name: United States of America v. Charles D. Pace
- Decided: February 24, 1992
- Citation: 955 F.2d 270

Case history
- Subsequent history: Cert. denied, 502 U.S. 883 (1992)

Court membership
- Judges sitting: Henry Anthony Politz, Carolyn Dineen King, Samuel D. Johnson Jr.

Case opinions
- Majority: King, joined by a unanimous court

Laws applied
- U.S. Const. amend. IV

United States v. Pace, 955 F.2d 270 (5th Cir. 1992), cert. denied, 502 U.S. 883 (1992) is a United States Court of Appeals for the Fifth Circuit court decision relating to the open fields doctrine limiting the scope of the Fourth Amendment of the U.S. Constitution.

Acting on a tip, Texas investigators, entered onto the defendant's property in Travis County and peeked through a hole in a barn where they discovered marijuana being cultivated. With this information the officers gained a search warrant, which they used to search the property. The defendant was eventually arrested, tried and convicted for possession with intent to distribute. The defendant challenged on Fourth Amendment grounds, claiming that the barn was inside the "curtilage" of his home. The court found that it was not and that the search was legal pursuant to the "open fields" doctrine. The court held that the search was constitutional and that the barn was not within the curtilage of the appellant's home because the barn was located a significant distance from the house, was separated from the house by an interior fence, was not being used for activities associated with the intimacies of home life, and was readily visible from the surrounding area.
