= Rick Haselton =

American judge (1953–2023)

Rick T. Haselton

Judge of the Oregon Court of Appeals
- In office 1994 – December 31, 2015
- Preceded by: Robert D. Durham
- Succeeded by: Scott A. Shorr

Personal details
- Born: 1953 Oregon, U.S.
- Died: May 17, 2023 (aged 69–70) Oregon, U.S.
- Education: Stanford University (BA); Yale University (JD)

Rick T. Haselton (1953 – May 17, 2023) is a former Judge of the Oregon Court of Appeals. He served from 1994–2015. From 2012–2015, he served as Chief Judge of the Court.

== Early life and career ==
Born in Oregon, Haselton received a high school diploma from West Albany High School in 1972 and an A.B. in political science from Stanford University in 1976. While at West Albany and Stanford, he worked as a farmworker, carpenter's helper, and teaching assistant. He received a J.D. in 1979 from Yale Law School, where he was a classmate and friend of future U.S. Supreme Court Justice Sonia Sotomayor.

During law school, Haselton clerked for the U.S. Attorney for Oregon Sidney I. Lezak. After leaving law school, he clerked for U.S. Ninth Circuit Court of Appeals Judge Alfred Goodwin from 1979 to 1980. In 1980, he became an attorney in private practice with the law firm of Lindsay, Hart, Neil & Weigler. He went on to join Haglund & Kirtley, where he worked until being appointed to the Oregon Court of Appeals in 1994.

He died on May 17, 2023.

Legal offices
Preceded by Robert D. Durham	Judge of the Oregon Court of Appeals; March 1994–2015	Succeeded by Scott A. Shorr
Preceded by David V. Brewer	Chief Judge of the Oregon Court of Appeals; January 2013–2015	Succeeded by Erika L. Hadlock
