= Oliver v. United States =

- Supreme Court of the United States

Argued November 9, 1983 Decided April 17, 1984
- Full case name: Oliver v. United States
- Citations: 466 U.S. 170 (more) 104 S. Ct. 1735; 80 L. Ed. 2d 214; 1984 U.S. LEXIS 55

Case history
- Prior: Certiorari to the United States Court of Appeals for the Sixth Circuit

Holding
- Open fields cannot support a reasonable expectation of privacy and are thus not protected by the Fourth Amendment.

Court membership
- Chief Justice Warren E. Burger Associate Justices William J. Brennan Jr. · Byron White; Thurgood Marshall · Harry Blackmun; Lewis F. Powell Jr. · William Rehnquist; John P. Stevens · Sandra Day O'Connor

Case opinions
- Majority: Powell, joined by Burger, Blackmun, Rehnquist, O'Connor; White (Parts I, II)
- Concurrence: White
- Dissent: Marshall, joined by Brennan, Stevens

Laws applied
- U.S. Const. amend. IV

Oliver v. United States, 466 U.S. 170 (1984), is a United States Supreme Court decision relating to the open fields doctrine limiting the Fourth Amendment to the United States Constitution.

== Background ==
Acting upon a tip that defendant was growing marijuana on his property, two Kentucky State Police officers drove onto defendant's land, past his house, up to a gate which was marked with a "no trespassing" sign. The officers left their vehicle and walked along a footpath around the gate onto defendant's property and continued down the road for nearly a mile. At that distance from the house, the two officers spotted a large marijuana crop on defendant's property. The defendant was later charged with drug offenses for this cultivation. At trial the defendant challenged the evidence on Fourth Amendment grounds.

== Opinion of the Court ==
After appeals, the Supreme Court affirmed the open fields rule derived from Hester v. United States (1924), and decided that the officers' actions did not constitute a "search" under the Fourth Amendment. The Court held:

[A]n individual may not legitimately demand privacy for activities conducted out of doors in fields, except in the area immediately surrounding the home...The [Fourth] Amendment reflects the recognition of the Framers that certain enclaves should be free from arbitrary government interference. For example, the Court since the enactment of the Fourth Amendment has stressed ‘the overriding respect for the sanctity of the home that has been embedded in our traditions since the origins of the Republic.’ Id at 178.

The Court cited policy reasons for preserving the open fields rule, stating that "open fields do not provide the setting for those intimate activities that the Amendment is intended to shelter from government interference or surveillance." Id at 178. The Court also cited practical considerations as weighing on its decision, since open fields "usually are accessible to the public," and "no trespassing" signs are generally ineffective at "bar[ring] the public from viewing open fields in rural areas," and "the public and police lawfully may survey lands from the air." Id at 178-179. Because of these considerations, the Court declined to accept the defendants' expectation of privacy as one that "society recognizes as reasonable." Id at 178-179.

== See also ==
- List of United States Supreme Court cases, volume 466
- Katz v. United States (1967)
- United States v. Dunn (1987)
