= Mary J. Deits =

American judge (born 1949)

Chief Judge Oregon Court of Appeals
- Preceded by: William L. Richardson
- Succeeded by: David V. Brewer

Mary J. Deits (born 1949) is lawyer and judge who served as the first woman to be chief judge of the Oregon Court of Appeals.

== Early life and education ==
Deits was born in Portland, Oregon, and graduated from high school in Medford, Oregon.

She attended college at Oregon State University, graduating with a B.A. in sociology in 1971. One of her undergraduate professors had encouraged her to pursue law school. She attended Willamette University for law, where she was one of a handful of women.

== Career ==
Deits passed the Oregon State Bar in 1974, and joined the Oregon Department of Justice as an assistant attorney general, only the third woman to be in that role. She worked in the trial, appellate, and general counsel divisions.

On February 28, 1986, Deits was appointed to the Oregon Court of Appeals by then-Governor Victor Atiyeh. She was the second woman to serve on the court, after Betty Roberts. She was elected in 1986, then re-elected in 1992 and 1998.

She became chief justice of the Oregon Court of Appeals in 1997. She was the first woman to serve as chief justice of the Oregon Court of Appeals, and one of the first women in the U.S. to serve as a chief justice of a state court of appeals.

As chief justice, she focused on leading school outreach program and appellate mediation programs. She also served as the president of the national Chief Judges Association.

She retired from the court in 2004, but maintains active work as a mediator and arbitrator. She also serves on the Oregon State University Honors College's Board of Regents. She also chaired a University of Oregon President's Review Panel that addressed how the campus handles sexual assault allegations.

The Oregon Women Lawyers recognized her with the Justice Betty Roberts Award, given to outstanding promotion of women in law, in 2007.
