= Apple cider vinegar =

Vinegar made from fermented apple juice

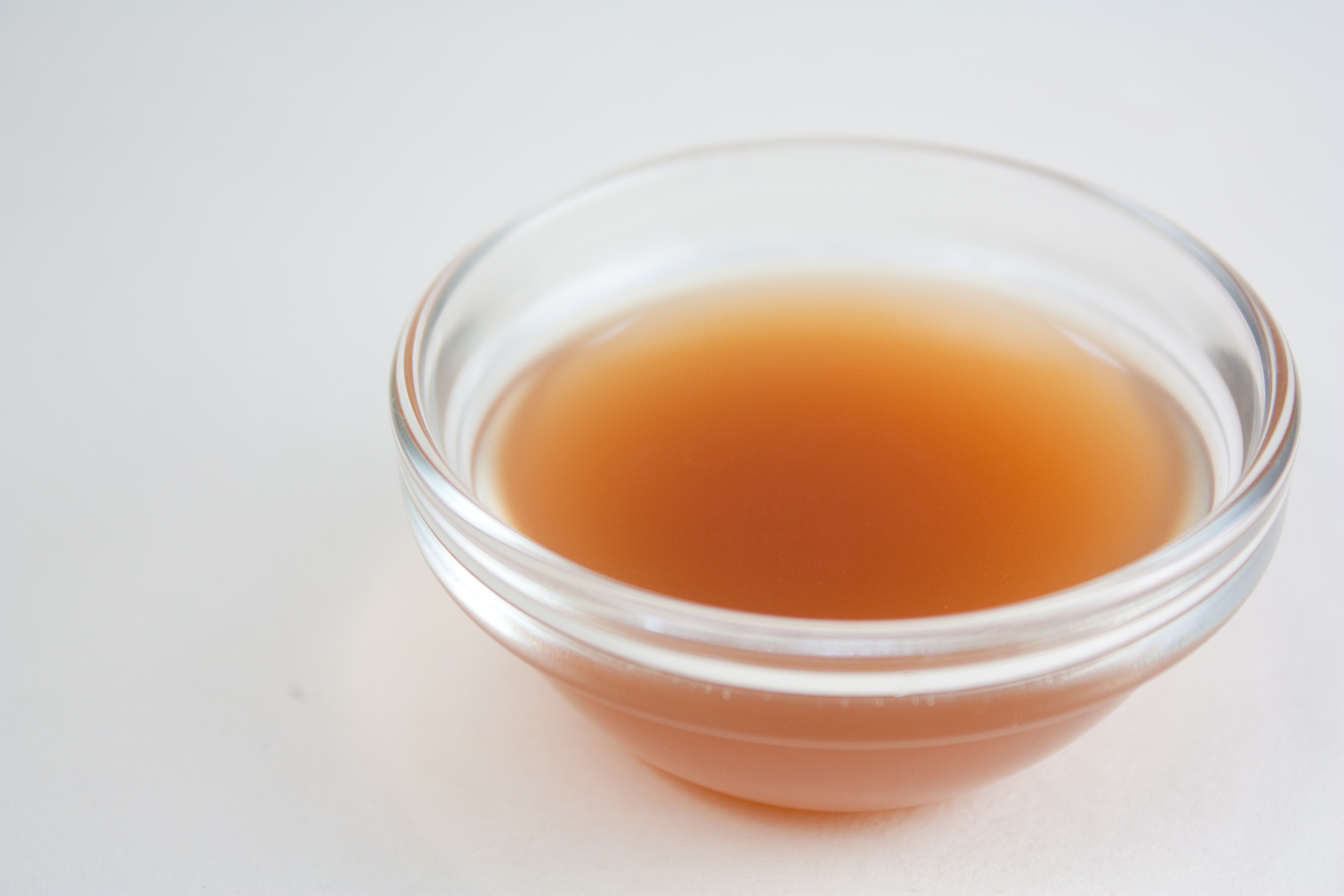

Apple cider vinegar, or cider vinegar, is a vinegar made from cider, and used in salad dressings, marinades, vinaigrettes, food preservatives, and chutneys. First, apples are crushed and pressed for juice. The apple juice is then fermented by yeast which converts the sugars in the juice to ethanol. In a second fermentation step, the ethanol is converted into acetic acid by acetic acid-forming bacteria (Acetobacter species), yielding cider vinegar. The acetic acid, together with the malic acid naturally present in apple juice, contribute to the sour taste of this vinegar.

There is no high-quality clinical evidence that regular consumption of apple cider vinegar helps to maintain or lose body weight, or is effective to manage blood glucose and lipid levels.

== History ==
Vinegar has historically been made with whatever sort of foods are available, and vinegars using fruits commonly available in the North Atlantic became popular in the early nineteenth century. One 1810 cookbook includes recipes for apple cider vinegar, gooseberry vinegar, and raisin vinegar.

== Production ==
Apples are washed, crushed, and pressed to extract the juice. Autochthonous or inoculated yeasts, mainly Saccharomyces cerevisiae, initiate alcoholic fermentation, converting the sugars in the juice into ethanol and producing apple cider. The apple cider is then inoculated with either a pure culture of acetic acid bacteria or a proportion of 'mother vinegar', resulting in a secondary acetic fermentation which then converts the ethanol in the cider to acetic acid, yielding apple cider vinegar. The "mother" is a cellulose-rich biofilm of acetic bacteria that may remain in unfiltered vinegar.

== Nutrition ==
Apple cider vinegar
Nutritional value per 100 g (3.5 oz)
- Energy: 90 kJ (22 kcal)
- Carbohydrates: 0.93 g
- Sugars: 0.40 g
- Dietary fiber: 0 g
- Fat: 0 g
- Protein: 0 g
Vitamins and minerals
Vitamins	Quantity %DV^{†}
Vitamin A equiv.	0% 0 μg
Thiamine (B1)	0% 0 mg
Riboflavin (B2)	0% 0 mg
Niacin (B3)	0% 0 mg
Vitamin B6	0% 0 mg
Folate (B9)	0% 0 μg
Vitamin B12	0% 0 μg
Vitamin C	0% 0 mg
Vitamin E	0% 0 mg
Vitamin K	0% 0 μg
Minerals	Quantity %DV^{†}
Calcium	1% 7 mg
Iron	1% 0.20 mg
Magnesium	1% 5 mg
Phosphorus	1% 8 mg
Potassium	2% 73 mg
Sodium	0% 5 mg
Zinc	0% 0.04 mg
- Other constituents: Quantity
- Water: 93.81 g
- ^{†}Percentages estimated using US recommendations for adults, except for potassium, which is estimated based on expert recommendation from the National Academies.

Apple cider vinegar is 94% water and 5% acetic acid with 1% carbohydrates and no fat or protein. In a 100 gram reference amount, it provides 90 kilojoules (22 kcal) of energy, with negligible content of micronutrients.

== Health effects ==
Evidence for apple cider vinegar having any health effect is poor, such as for weight loss, glycemic control or skin infections. Its use is not recommended for any therapy in medical guidelines of major public health organizations or regulatory agencies.

== Safety concerns ==
Moderate consumption of apple cider vinegar is safe, particularly if it is diluted, and the chance of side effects when it is consumed as directed and in the recommended amounts appears to be low. Reported adverse effects include esophageal damage due to incomplete swallowing of apple cider vinegar tablets, tooth enamel damage due to swallowing excessive quantities of apple cider vinegar, and increased frequency of burping, flatulence, and bowel movements. Consumption of vinegar can increase dentin hypersensitivity. Irritation and redness are common when the eyes come into contact with vinegar, and corneal injury can occur. Using vinegar as a topical medication, ear cleaning solution, or eye wash is hazardous. Although small amounts of apple cider vinegar may be used as a food flavoring, it may be unsafe for use by pregnant and breastfeeding women and by children. Different commercial brands of apple cider vinegar were found to have inconsistent acid levels, with some contaminated by molds and yeast.

If used as a homemade cleaning agent, apple cider vinegar, like any kind of vinegar, should not be mixed with chlorine bleach, the combination of which may release chlorine gas and irritate airways, eyes, nose and throat.

People with allergies to apples may experience allergic reactions to apple cider vinegar. Topical use of apple cider vinegar to treat skin diseases may cause burns. The use of apple cider vinegar may cause untoward interactions with prescription drugs, such as insulin or diuretics.

== See also ==
- D. C. Jarvis
- Fire cider
- United States v. Ninety-Five Barrels Alleged Apple Cider Vinegar
