= Oregon Court of Appeals =

Intermediate appellate court of Oregon

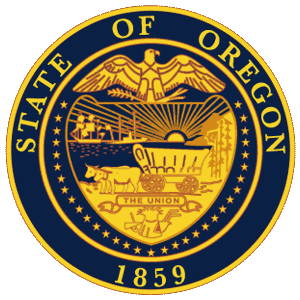
- State Seal of Oregon
- Established: July 1, 1969
- Jurisdiction: Oregon
- Location: Salem, Oregon
- Composition method: Non-partisan state-wide election
- Appeals to: Oregon Supreme Court
- Judge term length: 6 years
- Number of positions: 13
- Website: Official site

Chief Judge
- Currently: Erin C. Lagesen
- Since: 2022

The Oregon Court of Appeals is the state intermediate appellate court in the US state of Oregon. Part of the Oregon Judicial Department, it has thirteen judges and is located in Salem. Except for death penalty cases, which are reserved to the Oregon Supreme Court, and tax court cases, it has jurisdiction to hear all civil and criminal appeals from Oregon circuit courts, and to review actions of most state administrative agencies. The 13 judges of the court are chosen by the people in statewide nonpartisan elections to six-year terms, and have as their administrative head a Chief Judge appointed from their number by the Chief Justice of the state Supreme Court.

Appeals court decisions are subject to a petition by an aggrieved party for review by the Oregon Supreme Court. The petition must be made within 35 days of the decision, and the Supreme Court determines by vote of the Justices whether to review the case. The court holds session at the Oregon Supreme Court Building in Salem, with offices in the neighboring Justice Building.

== History ==
Established in 1969, the court originally had five seats before expanding to ten seats in 1977. Also in 1977, the court's jurisdiction was expanded to include almost all appeals. Prior to the expansion, it could only hear appeals to criminal, domestic relations, and some juvenile matters, as well as reviews of actions by state agencies. The Oregon Legislature has debated adding additional judgeships in both 2011 and 2012. Three seats were added in 2013 to bring the total to thirteen. The Oregon Court of Appeals is one of the busiest appellate courts in the country, handling between 3,200 and 4,100 cases annually during a recent ten-year period.

== Chief judges ==
Chief Judges from the history of the court.

Name	Years
Herbert M. Schwab	1969–1980
George M. Joseph	1981–1992
William L. Richardson	1993–1997
Mary J. Deits	1997–2004
David V. Brewer	2004–2012
Rick Haselton	2012–2016
Erika L. Hadlock	2016–2018
James C. Egan	2018–2021
Erin C. Lagesen	2022–present

== Current judges ==
The current thirteen member court.

Seat	Name	Born	Start	Term ends	Mandatory retirement	Appointer	Law school
12	Erin Lagesen, Chief Judge	1969 (age 56–57)	November 12, 2013	2032	2044	John Kitzhaber (D)	Willamette
3	Darleen Ortega	1962 (age 63–64)	October 13, 2003	2028	2037	Ted Kulongoski (D)	Michigan
6	James Egan	July 20, 1956 (age 70)	January 7, 2013	2030	2031	—N/a (Note: Took office after being elected in a nonpartisan election.)	Oregon
13	Douglas Tookey	January 14, 1963 (age 63)	November 12, 2013	2032	2038	John Kitzhaber (D)	Cornell
5	Scott Shorr	–	January 1, 2016	2028	–	Kate Brown (D)	Berkeley
4	Robyn Aoyagi	May 16, 1974 (age 52)	July 17, 2017	2030	2049	Kate Brown (D)	Harvard
7	Steven Powers	1975 (age 50–51)	July 17, 2017	2030	2050	Kate Brown (D)	Willamette
9	Jacqueline Kamins	–	January 17, 2020	2032	–	Kate Brown (D)	Virginia
8	Ramón Pagán	January 23, 1976 (age 50)	January 19, 2022	2028	2051	Kate Brown (D)	Fordham
10	Kristina Hellman	–	January 19, 2022	2028	–	Kate Brown (D)	Georgetown
11	Anna Joyce	–	January 19, 2022	2028	–	Kate Brown (D)	Oregon
2	Megan Jacquot	1971 (age 54–55)	January 1, 2023	2030	2046	Kate Brown (D)	Tulane
1	Ryan O'Connor	1978 (age 47–48)	March 31, 2025	2032	2053	Tina Kotek (D)	Notre Dame

== See also ==
- List of Oregon judges
