= List of United States Supreme Court cases by the White Court =

Supreme Court of the United States
White Court
- Fuller Court ← → Taft Court
- December 18, 1910 – May 19, 1921 (10 years, 152 days)
- Seat: Old Senate Chamber; Washington, D.C.
- No. of positions: 9
- White Court decisions

This is a partial chronological list of cases decided by the United States Supreme Court during the White Court, the tenure of Chief Justice Edward Douglass White from December 19, 1910 through May 19, 1921.

Case name	Citation	Summary
Bailey v. Alabama	211 U.S. 452 (1911)	peonage laws and the Thirteenth Amendment
Weems v. United States	217 U.S. 349 (1910)	cruel and unusual punishment
Bailey v. Alabama	219 U.S. 219 (1911)	Advisory opinion overturned peonage laws
Muskrat v. United States	219 U.S. 346 (1911)	Advisory opinion doctrine
Flint v. Stone Tracy Co.	220 U.S. 107 (1911)	constitutionality of corporate income tax
United States v. Grimaud	220 U.S. 506 (1911)	control of forest reserves
Standard Oil Co. of New Jersey v. United States	221 U.S. 1 (1910)	dissolving interstate monopolies
Dowdell v. United States	221 U.S. 325 (1911)	sometimes considered one of the Insular Cases
Gompers v. Buck's Stove and Range Co.	221 U.S. 418 (1911)	contempt for violating an injunction against a worker's boycott
Hoke v. United States	227 U.S. 308 (1913)	upheld the Mann Act, but held that Congress could not regulate prostitution
Bauer & Cie. v. O'Donnell	229 U.S. 1 (1913)	extensions of patents by use of licenses, rights of copyright holder regarding “use” of copyrighted works
Charlton v. Kelly	229 U.S. 447 (1913)	procedures to approve extradition of criminal suspect to another country
Stratton's Independence, Ltd. v. Howbert	231 U.S. 399 (1913)	
Weeks v. United States	232 U.S. 383 (1914)	establishment of the exclusionary rule for illegally obtained evidence
Ocampo v. United States	234 U.S. 91 (1914)	sometimes considered one of the Insular Cases
Shreveport Rate Case	234 U.S. 342 (1914)	Commerce clause, regulation of intrastate railroad rates
Coppage v. Kansas	236 U.S. 1 (1915)	Economic due process and yellow-dog contracts
Burdick v. United States	236 U.S. 79 (1915)	Legal effect of a pardon
Mutual Film Corporation v. Industrial Commission of Ohio	236 U.S. 230 (1915)	free speech and the censorship of motion pictures
Guinn v. United States	238 U.S. 347 (1915)	constitutionality of Oklahoma's "grandfather law" used to disenfranchise African-American voters
Hadacheck v. Sebastian	239 U.S. 394 (1915)	municipal regulation of land use
Bi-Metallic Investment Co. v. State Board of Equalization	239 U.S. 441 (1915)	denial of due process procedural protections for legislative and rulemaking acts, as opposed to adjudicatory proceedings
Brushaber v. Union Pacific Railroad	240 U.S. 1 (1916)	power to tax income under the Sixteenth Amendment
Stanton v. Baltic Mining Co.	240 U.S. 103 (1916)	power to tax income under the Sixteenth Amendment
Georgia, Florida, & Alabama Railway Co. v. Blish Milling Co.	241 U.S. 190 (1916)	responsibilities of parties under a bill of lading
United States v. Forty Barrels and Twenty Kegs of Coca-Cola	241 U.S. 265 (1916)	case brought against Coca-Cola under the Pure Food and Drug Act
United States v. Oppenheimer	242 U.S. 85 (1916)	doctrine of res judicata applies to criminal cases
American Well Works Co. v. Layne & Bowler Co.	241 U.S. 257 (1916)	scope of federal question jurisdiction in patent law case
Caminetti v. United States	242 U.S. 470 (1917)	Mann Act applies to consensual extramarital sex
Bunting v. Oregon	243 U.S. 426 (1917)	Labor law, ten-hour workday
Adams v. Tanner	244 U.S. 590 (1917)	Substantive due process, state's prohibition of employment agencies was unconstitutional under the Fourteenth Amendment
Buchanan v. Warley	245 U.S. 60 (1917)	constitutionality of local ordinance compelling racial segregation of residential housing
Chicago Board of Trade v. United States	246 U.S. 231 (1918)	Rules of a commodities exchange examined under rule of reason
Hammer v. Dagenhart	247 U.S. 251 (1918)	Congressional power to regulate child labor under the Commerce Clause
International News Service v. Associated Press	248 U.S. 215 (1918)	property rights in news; misappropriation doctrine
Schenck v. United States	249 U.S. 47 (1919)	freedom of speech, “clear and present danger”, “shouting fire in a crowded theater”
Debs v. United States	249 U.S. 211 (1919)	sedition
Abrams v. United States	250 U.S. 616 (1919)	validity of criminalizing criticism of the government
Silverthorne Lumber Co. v. United States	251 U.S. 385 (1920)	Fruit of the poisonous tree doctrine in a tax evasion case
Eisner v. Macomber	252 U.S. 189 (1920)	pro rata stock dividend not taxable income
Missouri v. Holland	252 U.S. 416 (1920)	states’ rights
United States v. Wheeler	254 U.S. 281 (1920)	Privileges and Immunities Clause and kidnapping
Smith v. Kansas City Title & Trust Co.	255 U.S. 180 (1921)	federal question jurisdiction in state corporate law matter
Newberry v. United States	256 U.S. 232 (1921)	Congress lacks the power to regulate primary elections
Dillon v. Gloss	256 U.S. 368 (1921)	Constitutional amendment process
Yee Won v. White	256 U.S. 399 (1921)	Chinese Exclusion Act
