= Agency worker law =

Agency worker law refers to a body of law which regulates the conduct of employment agencies and the labour law rights of people who get jobs through them. The typical situation involves the person going to an employment agency and then the employment agency sending the person to an actual employer for proper work.

Such arrangements are referred to by different terminology across jurisdictions. Some examples of terms used are 'labour hire', 'labour brokering', 'labor contracting', 'permatemping', or 'agency worker' arrangements.

== History ==
The International Labour Organization called for the establishment of public employment agencies in their place. To prevent the abusive practices of private agencies, they were to be fully abolished or at least tightly regulated. In most countries, they are legal but regulated.

Probably inspired by the dissenting judgments in a United States Supreme Court case called Adams v. Tanner, the International Labour Organization's first ever recommendation was targeted at fee-charging agencies. The Unemployment Recommendation, 1919 (No.1), Art. 1 called for each member to

"take measures to prohibit the establishment of employment agencies which charge fees or which carry on their business for profit. Where such agencies already exist, it is further recommended that they be permitted to operate only under government licenses, and that all practicable measures be taken to abolish such agencies as soon as possible."

The Unemployment Convention, 1919, Art. 2 required instead the alternative of

"a system of free public employment agencies under the control of a central authority. Committees, which shall include representatives of employers and workers, shall be appointed to advise on matters concerning the carrying on of these agencies."

In 1933, the Fee-Charging Employment Agencies Convention (No.34) formally called for abolition. The exception was if the agencies were licensed and a fee scale was agreed in advance. In 1949, a new revised Convention (No.96) was produced. That kept the same scheme but secured an ‘opt out’ (Art. 2) for members that did not wish to sign up. Agencies were an increasingly entrenched part of the labor market. The United States did not sign up to the Conventions. The latest Convention, the Private Employment Agencies Convention, 1997 (No.181) takes a much softer stance and calls merely for regulation.

== Particular jurisdictions ==
=== Australia ===
Enterprise bargaining agreements (EBAs) applicable to a workplace do not legally cover labour hire employees and their employers, unless there is a clause written into the agreement expressing that to be the case. Instead, EBAs are formed between employees of the labour hire company, and the labour hire company itself. This can result in a pay difference between actual employees of a worksite, and those working there through labour hire, an aspect that has been criticized by the Australian Labor Party.

=== European Union ===
The problem related to the Temporary agency work in Europe has formally achieved its maturity through the implementation of the Council Directive 2008/104/EC after nearly three decades of debate. In this way, the directive, as being the third part of the European Union's employment law package to protect atypical working (which includes part-time workers and fixed-term workers), aims both to establish a suitable framework for the use of temporary agency work and to develop a flexible form of working.

=== Germany ===
In Germany the Arbeitnehmerüberlassungsgesetz (Employee Hiring Law of 1972) regulates the agency relationship. It Following the provisions in the Burgerliches Gesetzbuch (Civil Code) on the law of leasing goods or finance, the agency relationship is seen as a triangular arrangement, with different obligations on each side. The worker is an employee of the agency only. The contract between the agency and the end-employer is termed as a hire of labour. Between the worker and the end-employer there is no contract. There is only a statutory obligation to give equal treatment in terms and conditions of work.

=== United Kingdom ===
The UK's main piece of legislation falls under the Employment Agencies Act 1973, which required licensing until 1994. There is an exception, for employment agencies working in the agricultural, shellfishing and food packing sectors, under the Gangmasters (Licensing) Act 2004.

=== United States ===
- Adams v. Tanner
- In Ribnik v. McBride, 277 US 350 (1928), the court struck down a similar New Jersey law attempting to regulate agencies, Justices Stone, Brandeis and Holmes dissenting. This is probably no longer good law.
- Doubt was placed on the leading dicta of Adams v. Tanner in Olsen v. State of Nebraska 313 US 236 (1941) and Lincoln Union v. Northwestern Co., 335 US 525 (1949) 535. In the latter, Justice Black said that Adams v. Tanner was part of the "constitutional philosophy" which struck down minimum wages and maximum working hours.

== See also ==
- At-will employment
- Precarious work
- Amir Paz-Fuchs "It Ain't Necessarily So: A Legal Realist Perspective on the Law of Agency Work" Modern Law Review (2020)
