= Re Judiciary and Navigation Acts =

- Court: High Court of Australia
- Full case name: In Re The Judiciary Act 1903-1920; In Re The Navigation Act 1912-1920
- Decided: 16 May 1921
- Citations: [1921] HCA 20; (1921) 29 CLR 257

Court membership
- Judges sitting: Chief Justice Adrian Knox; Justice Henry Higgins; Justice Frank Gavan Duffy; Justice Charles Powers; Justice George Rich; Justice Hayden Starke

Case opinions
- The provisions of the Judiciary Act purporting to allow the High Court to hear advisory opinions were invalid (per Knox, Duffy, Powers, Rich and Starke); The word "matter" in chapter III of the Constitution relates to legal rights or duties currently in dispute. It does not extend to theoretical legal interpretation (per Knox, Duffy, Powers, Rich and Starke)

Re Judiciary and Navigation Acts (1921) 29 CLR 257 is a landmark judgment of the High Court of Australia. The matter related to what is a legal matter and the High Court's ability to issue opinion outside a case.

== Background ==
The Attorney-General of Victoria, raised an objection that section 88 of the Judiciary Act 1903 was beyond the powers of the Commonwealth Parliament.

== Finding ==
The court found that the High Court could not issue legal opinions unattached to a specific case. The joint majority judgment stated:

But we can find nothing in Chapter III of the Constitution to lend colour to the view that parliament can confer power or jurisdiction upon the High Court to determine abstract questions of law without the right or duty of any body or person being involved.

On the issue of what constituted a matter they said:

In our opinion there can be no matter within the meaning of s 76 of the Constitution unless there is some immediate right, duty or liability to be established by the determination of the Court.

== See also ==
- Hayburn's Case (1792) and Muskrat v. United States (1911), similar rulings of the Supreme Court of the United States
