= Southern Pacific Co. v. Jensen =

Southern Pacific Company v. Jensen
- Supreme Court of the United States

Argued February 28, 1916 Reargued January 31–February 1, 1917 Decided May 21, 1917
- Full case name: Southern Pacific Company v. Marie Jensen
- Citations: 244 U.S. 205 (more) 37 S. Ct. 524; 61 L. Ed. 1086; 1917 U.S. LEXIS 1628; 1996 AMC 2076

Case history
- Prior: Error to the Supreme Court, Appellate Division, Third Judicial Department, of the State of New York

Holding
- State legislation affecting maritime commerce is invalid if it contravenes the essential purpose expressed by an act of Congress, or works material prejudice to the characteristic features of the general maritime law, or interfere with the proper harmony and uniformity of the law in its international and interstate relations.

Court membership
- Chief Justice Edward D. White Associate Justices Joseph McKenna · Oliver W. Holmes Jr. William R. Day · Willis Van Devanter; Mahlon Pitney · James C. McReynolds; Louis Brandeis · John H. Clarke

Case opinions
- Majority: McReynolds, joined by White, Day, Van Devanter, McKenna
- Dissent: Holmes, joined by Brandeis, Clarke
- Dissent: Pitney, joined by Brandeis, Clarke

Laws applied
- U.S. Const. art. 3, § 2; Judiciary Act of 1789; Federal Employers' Liability Act; New York Workmen's Compensation Act

Southern Pacific Company v. Jensen, 244 U.S. 205 (1917), was a United States Supreme Court case concerning the geographical extent of state workers' compensation laws. The Court held that the New York Workmen's Compensation Act, as applied to laborers in the New York Harbor, intruded on federal admiralty jurisdiction, and that civil suits arising within this jurisdiction were subject to the common law of the sea. The compensation statute passed by the state interfered with federal power and was therefore unconstitutional.

The case is noted for the dissent written by Justice Holmes, specifically his dicta on the nature of the common law:

The common law is not a brooding omnipresence in the sky, but the articulate voice of some sovereign or quasi sovereign that can be identified.

== Background ==
In 1914, Christen Jensen was killed in an accident while unloading cargo in the New York Harbor. Jensen was an employee of the Southern Pacific Company, a railroad carrier which also operated a steamship line. Jensen worked as a stevedore on the ship that transported cargo between New York and Texas. He left behind him his wife Marie and their two young children. The Workmen's Compensation Commission of New York provided an award to Jensen's family members, in accordance with the state statute. The award of compensation was objected to by the Southern Pacific Company, who argued that Jensen had been involved in interstate commerce at the time of his death and that rules of liability were to be determined by Congress. The award was upheld by the appellate division and the New York Court of Appeals.

== The Supreme Court's decision ==
In a 5–4 decision, the Court held in favor of the employer. The majority opinion was written by Justice James C. McReynolds. Liability for a railroad carrier engaged in interstate commerce, McReynolds said, could only be determined by federal statute. The Federal Employers' Liability Act, however, was not applicable to the present case:

Evidently the purpose was to prescribe a rule applicable where the parties are engaging in something having direct and substantial connection with railroad operations, and not with another kind of carriage recognized as separate and distinct from transportation on land and no mere adjunct thereto. It is unreasonable to suppose that Congress intended to change long-established rules applicable to maritime matters merely because the ocean-going ship concerned happened to be owned and operated by a company also a common carrier by railroad.

In regard to the New York state law, it conflicted with the general maritime law, reserved to federal jurisdiction under article 3, § 2 of the Constitution. This article extends the judicial power of the United States "to all cases of admiralty and maritime jurisdiction", and article 1, § 8 confers upon Congress the power "to make all laws which shall be necessary and proper for carrying into execution the foregoing powers and all other powers vested by this Constitution in the government of the United States or in any department or officer thereof." Congress was authorized to confer jurisdiction over maritime disputes, and the work of a stevedore was maritime in nature. If federal jurisdiction had been established, the states were prevented from imposing their authority. Otherwise, the foundation of the federal structure in maritime matters could be threatened:

If New York can subject foreign ships coming into her ports to such obligations as those imposed by her Compensation Statute, other states may do likewise. The necessary consequence would be destruction of the very uniformity in respect to maritime matters which the Constitution was designed to establish; and freedom of navigation between the states and with foreign countries would be seriously hampered and impeded.

Pursuant to § 9 of the Judiciary Act of 1789, civil suits arising within the limits of maritime or admiralty jurisdiction are reserved to federal district courts, to be decided by application of the common law. However, the act also includes a clause allowing for a party to pursue a remedy for a maritime claim in a state court when entitled to such remedy. This rule is known as the "saving-to-suitors clause". McReynolds, having held state regulation invalid, concluded that the compensation statute furnished by the state could not withstand common law scrutiny:

The remedy which the Compensation Statute attempts to give is of a character wholly unknown to the common law, incapable of enforcement by the ordinary processes of any court, and is not saved to suitors from the grant of exclusive jurisdiction.

Justices Oliver W. Holmes Jr. and Mahlon Pitney filed separate dissents.

=== Holmes' dissent ===
Holmes contended that the state law prescribed absolute liability and that the issue to be decided was the effect of federal jurisdiction:

The short question is whether the power of the state to regulate the liability in that place and to enforce it in the state's own courts is taken away by the conferring of exclusive jurisdiction of all civil causes of admiralty and maritime jurisdiction upon the courts of the United States.

There was no question, Holmes said, that the saving-to-suitors clause allowed for state courts to exercise common law jurisdiction, and left to the state some power of legislation. This could be observed in state statutes dealing with pilotage and liens in aid of maritime contracts. Moreover, the Court had previously held that a statutory remedy for causing death could be enforced by the state courts, when the death was due to a collision upon the high seas. There could be no constitutional difference, Holmes said, in imposing liability for accident instead of fault. Both rules were unprecedented in maritime or common law.

Holmes further asserted that maritime torts would be equally valid in cases not due to death. Maritime law did not constitute an exhaustive body of law, but was amenable to state action:

Taking it as established that a state has constitutional power to pass laws giving rights and imposing liabilities for acts done upon the high seas when there were no such rights or liabilities before, what is there to hinder its doing so in the case of a maritime tort? Not the existence of an inconsistent law emanating from a superior source, that is, from the United States. There is no such law. The maritime law is not a corpus juris—it is a very limited body of customs and ordinances of the sea.

Holmes noted that a common law remedy for a stevedore injured while loading a ship had been sustained by the Court in a prior decision. That ruling, Holmes said, was the result of incremental adjudication that could be traced to either statutes or common law of the state. This exemplified the states' relationship to the maritime law:

For from the often-repeated statement that there is no common law of the United States, and from the principles recognized in Atlantic Transport Co. v. Imbrovek having been unknown to the maritime law, the natural inference is that, in the silence of Congress, this court has believed the very limited law of the sea to be supplemented here as in England by the common law, and that here that means, by the common law of the state (...) Even where the admiralty has unquestioned jurisdiction the common law may have concurrent authority and the state courts concurrent power.

In Holmes' view, the repository of law for the district court originated in state power, and the common law applied was on equal footing with state statutes:

The common law is not a brooding omnipresence in the sky, but the articulate voice of some sovereign or quasi sovereign that can be identified (...) It always is the law of some state, and if the district courts adopt the common law of torts, as they have shown a tendency to do, they thereby assume that a law not of maritime origin, and deriving its authority in that territory only from some particular state of this Union, also governs maritime torts in that territory,—and if the common law, the statute law has at least equal force (...)

Holmes observed that jurisdiction over maritime matters had not been explicitly granted to the states as it had to Congress. But a previous line of cases, all of which had sustained adjudication in accordance with state law, was sufficient demonstration of federal acclimation to state influence:

(...) show that it is too late to say that the mere silence of Congress excludes the statute or common law of a state from supplementing the wholly inadequate maritime law of the time of the Constitution, in the regulation of personal rights, and I venture to say that it never has been supposed to do so, or had any such effect.

=== Pitney's dissent ===
In a long dissent, Pitney decried what he said was a decision "entirely unsupported by precedent" that would have "novel and farreaching consequences". The grant of federal admiralty jurisdiction was not intended to limit the states from establishing separate and independent systems of law in maritime matters. In the absence of congressional legislation, the states were free to set their own rules, and civil suits in admiralty did not have to be confined to federal courts. The Court's decision, Pitney said, was an undue encroachment upon state power, and effectively invalidated the saving-to-suitors clause:

(...) it is not necessary, in order to give full effect to the grant of admiralty and maritime jurisdiction, to imply that the rules of decision prevailing in admiralty must be binding upon common-law courts exercising concurrent jurisdiction in civil causes of maritime origin, and to give such a construction to the Constitution is to render unconstitutional the saving clause in § 9 of the Judiciary Act, and also to trench upon the proper powers of the states by interfering with their control over their water-borne internal commerce.

== Subsequent developments ==
In October 1917, Congress passed an amendment to the Judiciary Act of 1789 which outlined the powers of the federal government in the area of maritime jurisdiction, including an exemption that allowed for workmen's compensation claimants to seek benefits under state compensation laws.
