= Electric utility =

Type of electric power company

An electric utility, power utility, electric company, or power company is a company in the electric power industry (often a public utility) that engages in electricity generation and distribution of electricity for sale generally in a regulated market. Electric utilities are major providers of energy in most countries.

Electric utilities include investor owned, publicly owned, cooperatives, and nationalized entities. They may be engaged in all or only some aspects of the industry. Electricity markets are also considered electric utilities—these entities buy and sell electricity, acting as brokers, but usually do not own or operate generation, transmission, or distribution facilities. Utilities are regulated by local and national authorities.

Electric utilities are facing increasing demands including aging infrastructure, reliability, and regulation.

In 2009, the French company EDF was the world's largest producer of electricity.

== Organization ==
=== Power transactions ===
An electric power system is a group of generation, transmission, distribution, communication, and other facilities that are physically connected. The flow of electricity within the system is maintained and controlled by dispatch centers which can buy and sell electricity based on system requirements.

=== Executive compensation ===
The executive compensation received by the executives in utility companies often receives the scrutiny in the review of operating expenses. Just as regulated utilities and their governing bodies struggle to maintain a balance between keeping consumer costs reasonable and being profitable enough to attract investors, they also compete with private companies for talented executives and then be able to retain those executives.

Regulated companies are less likely to use incentive-based remuneration in addition to base salaries. Executives in regulated electric utilities are less likely to be paid for their performance in bonuses or stock options. They are less likely to approve compensation policies that include incentive-based pay. The compensation for electric utility executives will be the lowest in regulated utilities that have an unfavorable regulatory environment. These companies have more political constraints than those in a favorable regulatory environment and are less likely to have a positive response to requests for rate increases.

Just as increased constraints from regulation drive compensation down for executives in electric utilities, deregulation has been shown to increase remuneration. The need to encourage risk-taking behavior in seeking new investment opportunities while keeping costs under control requires deregulated companies to offer performance-based incentives to their executives. It has been found that increased compensation is also more likely to attract executives experienced in working in competitive environments.

In the United States, the Energy Policy Act of 1992 removed previous barriers to wholesale competition in the electric utility industry. Currently 24 states allow for deregulated electric utilities: Ohio, Oklahoma, Oregon, Pennsylvania, Rhode Island, Texas, Virginia, Arizona, Arkansas, California, Connecticut, Delaware, Illinois, Maine, Maryland, Massachusetts, Michigan, Montana, New Hampshire, New Jersey, New Mexico, New York, and Washington D.C. As electric utility monopolies have been increasingly broken up into deregulated businesses, executive compensation has risen; particularly incentive compensation.

== Oversight ==
Oversight is typically carried out at the national level, however it varies depending on financial support and external influences. There is no existence of any influential international energy oversight organization. There does exist a World Energy Council, but its mission is mostly to advise and share new information. It does not hold any kind of legislative or executive power.

== Alternative energy promotion ==
Alternative energy has become more and more prevalent in recent times and as it is inherently independent of more traditional sources of energy, the market seems to have a very different structure. In the United States, to promote the production and development of alternative energies, there are many subsidies, rewards, and incentives that encourage companies to take up the challenge themselves. There is precedent for such a system working in countries like Nicaragua. In 2005, Nicaragua gave renewable energy companies tax and duty exemptions, which spurred a great deal of private investment.

The success in Nicaragua may not be an easily replicated situation however. The movement was known as Energiewende and it is generally considered a failure for many reasons. A primary reason was that it was improperly timed and was proposed during a period in which their energy economy was under more competition.

Globally, the transition of electric utilities to renewables remains slow, hindered by concurrent continued investment in the expansion of fossil fuel capacity.

== Nuclear energy ==
Nuclear energy may be classified as a green source depending on the country. Although there used to be much more privatization in this energy sector, after the 2011 Fukushima district nuclear power plant disaster in Japan, there has been a move away from nuclear energy itself, especially for privately owned nuclear power plants. The criticism being that privatization of companies tend to have the companies themselves cutting corners and costs for profits which has proven to be disastrous in the worst-case scenarios. This placed a strain on many other countries as many foreign governments felt pressured to close nuclear power plants in response to public concerns. Nuclear energy however still holds a major part in many communities around the world.

== Customer expectations ==
Utilities have found it challenging to meet the differing needs of residential, corporate, industrial, government, and military customers. In the twenty-first century, customers have developed expectations that place new demands on the electric grid. These include access to additional tools, improved data for managing energy use, enhanced cybersecurity measures, and systems designed to reduce outage duration and speed up power restoration.

== See also ==
- Consumer Advocate for Customers of Public Utilities
- Electricity transmission
- Rate Case
