= Adams v. Tanner =

- Supreme Court of the United States

Argued May 7, 1917 Decided June 11, 1917
- Full case name: Joe Adams, et al., Appts., v. W. V. Tanner, Attorney General of the State of Washington, and George H. Crandall, Prosecuting Attorney of Spokane County, State of Washington.
- Citations: 244 U.S. 590 (more) 37 S. Ct. 662; 61 L. Ed. 1336

Holding
- The Washington state law that prohibited employment agencies was unconstitutional, because a ban would breach the principle of due process of law in the deprivation of liberty and property.

Court membership
- Chief Justice Edward D. White Associate Justices Joseph McKenna · Oliver W. Holmes Jr. William R. Day · Willis Van Devanter; Mahlon Pitney · James C. McReynolds; Louis Brandeis · John H. Clarke

Case opinions
- Majority: McReynolds, joined by White, Day, Van Devanter, Pitney
- Dissent: Brandeis, joined by McKenna, Holmes, Clarke

Adams v. Tanner, 244 U.S. 590 (1917), was a United States Supreme Court case in which the Court held that a Washington state law that prohibited employment agencies was unconstitutional.

== Facts ==
Washington voters passed a ballot initiative, supported by the then Federal Department of Labor, to prohibit private employment agencies charging fees to people seeking work. It read as follows,

Section 1. The welfare of the State of Washington depends on the welfare of its workers, and demands that they be protected from conditions that result in their being liable to imposition and extortion.

The State of Washington therefore, exercising herein its police and sovereign power, declares that the system of collecting fees from the workers for furnishing them with employment, or with information leading thereto, results frequently in their becoming the victims of imposition and extortion, and is therefore detrimental to the welfare of the state.

Section 2. It shall be unlawful for any employment agent, his representative, or any other person to demand or receive either directly or indirectly from any person seeking employment, or from any person on his or her behalf, any remuneration or fee whatsoever for furnishing him or her with employment or with information leading thereto.

Section 3. For each and every violation of any of the provisions of this act, the penalty shall be a fine of not more than $100 and imprisonment for not more than thirty days.

== Judgment ==
=== Majority ===
Chief Justice White, Justices Day, Van Devanter, Pitney and McReynold held that a ban would breach the principle of due process of law in the deprivation of liberty and property. The ban was arbitrary and oppressive. Mr Justice Reynold said,

there is nothing inherently immoral or dangerous to public welfare in acting as paid representative of another to find a position in which he can earn an honest living. On the contrary, such service is useful, commendable, and in great demand. (at 593)

=== Dissent ===
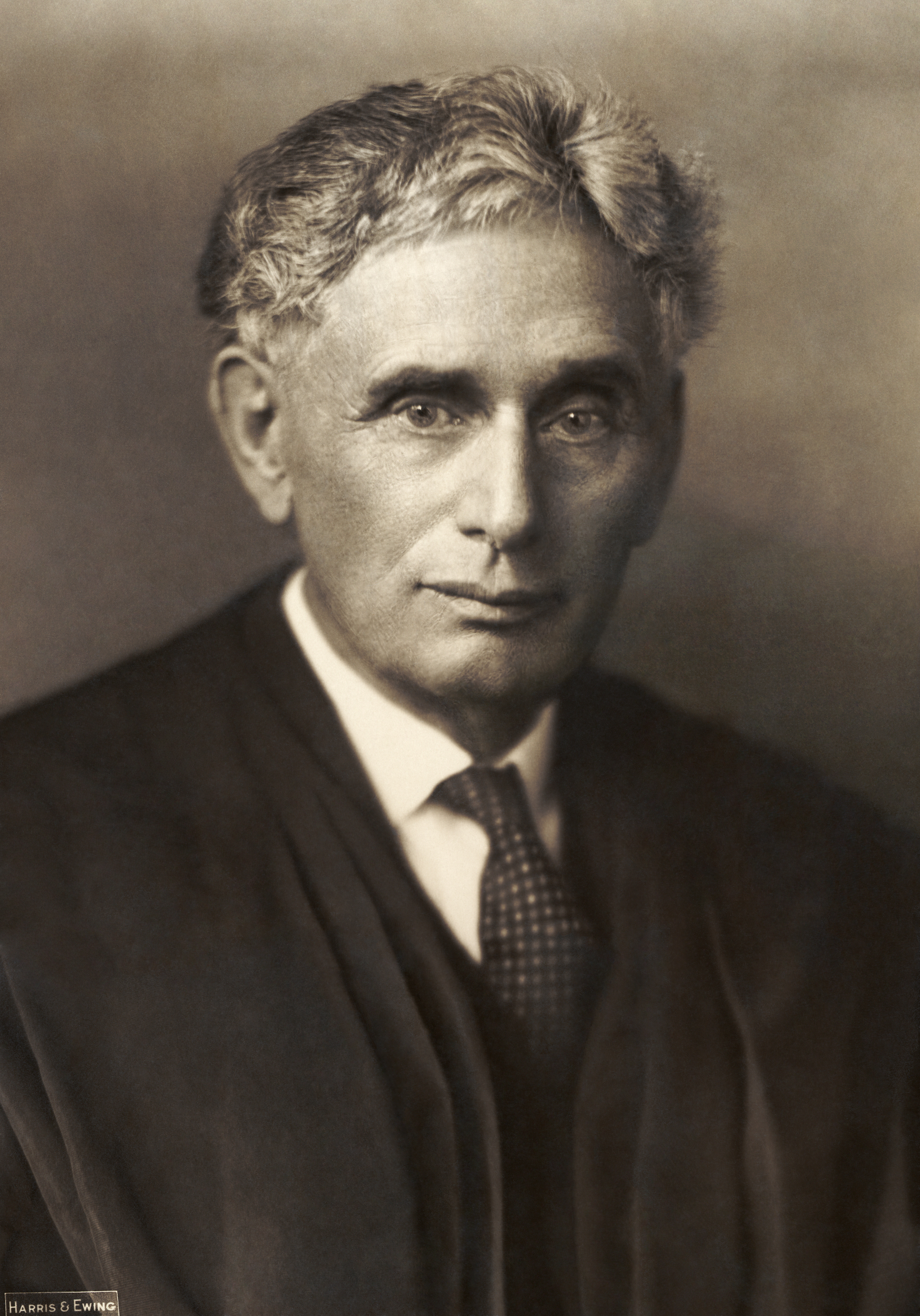
Brandeis J's dissent was notable as one of the first attempts to rely on policy documents in support of a judicial decision.

Justice Brandeis (with whom Justice Holmes, Clarke and McKenna dissented) laid out in his dissenting judgment why employment agency activities were a legitimate concern. He highlighted sources from US Labor Department giving examples of abuse, attempts in over thirty states to regulate and have free public agencies compete. He stated how all methods short of abolition had ultimately failed (601-9).

In this period, the practice of charging destitute workers upfront fees for finding work was widespread. People might give up their last pennies for the chance of work. Sometimes, agencies made no effort to place the worker, or the work would last a few days and the employer would then split the next fee with the agent to bring in fresh replacements. Justice Brandeis cited from a report to a 1912 Congress Committee.

To declare the statute of a state, enacted in the exercise of the police power, invalid under the Fourteenth Amendment is a matter of such seriousness that I state the reasons for my dissent from the opinion of the court. The statute of the State of Washington commonly known as the "Abolishing Employment Offices Measure" was proposed by Initiative Petition No. 8, filed July 3, 1914, and was adopted November 3, 1914, at the general election, 162,054 votes being cast for the measure and 144,544 against it. In terms, the act merely prohibits the taking of fees from those seeking employment.

Plaintiffs, who are proprietors of private employment agencies in the City of Spokane, assert that this statute, if enforced, would compel them to discontinue business, and would thus, in violation of the Fourteenth Amendment, deprive them of their liberty and property without due process of law. The act leaves the plaintiffs free to collect fees from employers, and it appears that private employment offices thus restricted are still carrying on business. But even if it should prove, as plaintiffs allege, that their business could not live without collecting fees from employees, that fact would not necessarily render the act invalid. Private employment agencies are a business properly subject to police regulation and control. Brazee v. Michigan, 241 U. S. 340. And this Court has made it clear that a statute enacted to promote health, safety, morals, or the public welfare may be valid, although it will compel discontinuance of existing businesses in whole or in part. Statutes prohibiting the manufacture and sale of liquor present the most familiar example of such a prohibition. But where, as here, no question of interstate commerce is involved, this Court has sustained also statutes or municipal ordinances which compelled discontinuance of such business as (a) of manufacturing and selling oleomargarine, Powell v. Pennsylvania, 127 U. S. 678; (b) of selling cigarettes, Austin v. Tennessee, 179 U. S. 343; (c) of selling futures in grain or other commodities, Booth v. Illinois, 184 U. S. 425; (d) of selling stocks on margin, Otis v. Parker, 187 U. S. 606; (e) of keeping billiard halls, Murphy v. California, 225 U. S. 623; (f) of selling trading stamps, Rast v. Van Deman & Lewis Co., 240 U. S. 342, 240 U. S. 368.

These cases show that the scope of the police power is not limited to regulation, as distinguished from prohibition. They show also that the power of the state exists equally whether the end sought to be attained is the promotion of health, safety, or morals or is the prevention of fraud or the prevention of general demoralization.

"If the state thinks that an admitted evil cannot be prevented except by prohibiting a calling or transaction not in itself necessarily objectionable, the courts cannot interfere unless, in looking at the substance of the matter, they can see that it 'is a clear, unmistakable infringement of rights secured by the fundamental law.'"

Otis v. Parker, 187 U. S. 606, 187 U. S. 609; Booth v. Illinois, 184 U. S. 425, 184 U. S. 429. Or, as it is so frequently expressed, the action of the legislature is final unless the measure adopted appears clearly to be arbitrary or unreasonable, or to have no real or substantial relation to the object sought to be attained. Whether a measure relating to the public welfare is arbitrary or unreasonable, whether it has no substantial relation to the end proposed, is obviously not to be determined by assumptions or by a priori reasoning. The judgment should be based upon a consideration of relevant facts, actual or possible – ex facto jus oritur. That ancient rule must prevail in order that we may have a system of living law.

It is necessary to inquire, therefore: what was the evil which the people of Washington sought to correct? Why was the particular remedy embodied in the statute adopted? And, incidentally, what has been the experience, if any, of other states or countries in this connection? But these inquiries are entered upon not for the purpose of determining whether the remedy adopted was wise, or even for the purpose of determining what the facts actually were. The decision of such questions lies with the legislative branch of the government. Powell v. Pennsylvania, 127 U. S. 678, 127 U. S. 685. The sole purpose of the inquiries is to enable this Court to decide whether, in view of the facts, actual or possible, the action of the State of Washington was so clearly arbitrary or so unreasonable that it could not be taken "by a free government without a violation of fundamental rights." See McCray v. United States, 195 U. S. 27, 195 U. S. 64.

1. The Evils

The evils with which the people of Washington were confronted arose partly from the abuses incident to the system of private employment agencies and partly from its inadequacy.

(a) The Abuses.

These are summarized in a report published by the United States Bureau of Labor in October, 1912, thus:

"Private employment agencies, which charge a fee for their services, are found in every city of any size in the United States. The nature of their business is such as to make possible most iniquitous practices. Their patrons are frequently men and women with only a dollar or two, which they are eager to give up for the opportunity of earning more. They are often of small intelligence and easily duped. Stories of how these agencies have swindled and defrauded those who sought employment through them are heard universally. Some of the more common of the fraudulent methods said to be used by these agencies are the following:"

"1. Charging a fee and failing to make any effort to find work for the applicant."

"2. Sending applicants where no work exists."

"3. Sending applicants to distant points where no work or where unsatisfactory work exists, but whence the applicant will not return on account of the expense involved."

"4. Collusion between the agent and employer whereby the applicant is given a few days' work and then discharged to make way for new workmen, the agent and employer dividing the fee."

"5. Charging exorbitant fees, or giving jobs to such applicants as contribute extra fees, presents, etc."

"6. Inducing workers, particularly girls, who have been placed, to leave, pay another fee, and get a 'better job.' "

"Other evils charged against employment agents are the congregating of persons for gambling or other evil practices, collusion with keepers of immoral houses, and the sending of women applicants to houses of prostitution; sometimes employment offices are maintained in saloons, with the resulting evils."

In the report to Congress of the United States Commission on Industrial Relations, created by Act of August 23, 1912, c. 351, 37 Stat. 415, which gave public hearings on the subject of employment offices in May 1914, the abuses are found to be as follows:

"23. There are many private employment agents who try to conduct their business honestly, but they are the exception, rather than the rule. The business as a whole reeks with fraud, extortion, and flagrant abuses of every kind. The most common evils are as follows:"

"Fees are often charged out of all proportion to the service rendered. We know of cases where $5, $9, $10, and even $16 apiece has been paid for jobs at common labor. In one city, the fees paid by scrubwomen is at the rate of $24 a year for their poorly paid work. Then there is discrimination in the charges made for the same jobs. Often, too, men are sent a long distance, made to pay fees and transportation, only to find that no one at that place ordered men from the employment agent. A most pernicious practice is the collusion with foremen or superintendents by which the employment agent 'splits fees' with them. That is, the foreman agrees to hire men of a certain employment agent on condition that one fourth or one half of every fee collected from men whom he hires be given to him. This leads the foreman to discharge men constantly in order to have more men hired through the agent and more fees collected. It develops the 'three-gang' method so universally complained of by railroad and construction laborers, namely, one gang working, another coming to work from the employment agent, and a third going back to the city."

"Finally, there is the most frequent abuse – misrepresentation of terms and condition of employment. Men are told that they will get more wages than are actually paid, or that the work will last longer than it actually will, or that there is a boarding house when there really is an insanitary camp, or that the cost of transportation will be paid, when it is to be deducted from the wages. They are not told of other deductions that will be made from wages; they are not informed about strikes that may be on at the places to which they are sent, nor about other important facts which they ought to know. These misrepresentations, it must be said, are often as much the fault of the employer as of the labor agent. Also, the employer will place his call for help with several agents, and each will send enough to fill the whole order, causing many to find no jobs. Labor agents and laborers alike are guilty of the misuse of free transportation furnished by employers to prospective help. And it is true also that many applicants perpetrate frauds on the labor agents themselves – as, for example, causing them to return fees when positions actually were secured. This is the result of the general feeling that the whole system of paying fees for jobs is unjust, and if they must pay in order to get work, then any attempt to get the fee back is justifiable."

(b) The Inadequacy.

But the evils were not limited to what are commonly called abuses, like the fraud and extortion described above. Even the exemplary private offices charging fees to workers might prove harmful for the reason thus stated in the report to Congress of the United States Commission on Industrial Relations, cited supra.

"18. ... Investigations show, however, that, instead of relieving unemployment and reducing irregularity, these employment agencies actually serve to congest the labor market and to increase idleness and irregularity of employment. They are interested primarily in the fees they can earn, and if they can earn more by bringing workers to an already overcrowded city, they do so. Again, it is an almost universal custom among private employment agents to fill vacancies by putting in them people who are working at other places. In this way, new vacancies are created, and more fees can be earned."

"19. They also fail to meet the problem because they are so numerous and are necessarily competitive. With few exceptions, there is no cooperation among them. This difficulty is further emphasized by the necessity of paying the registration fees required by many agencies; obviously the laborer cannot apply to very many if he has to pay a dollar at each one."

"20. The fees which private employment offices must charge are barriers which prevent the proper flow of labor into the channels where it is needed, and are a direct influence in keeping men idle. In the summer, when employment is plentiful, the fees are as low as 25 cents, and men are even referred to work free of charge. But this must necessarily be made up in the winter, when work is scarce. At such times, when men need work most badly, the private employment offices put up their fees and keep the unemployed from going to work until they can pay $2, $3, $5, and even $10 and more for their jobs. This necessity of paying for the privilege of going to work, and paying more the more urgently the job is needed, not only keeps people unnecessarily unemployed, but seems foreign to the spirit of American freedom and opportunity."

"21. An additional injustice inevitably connected with labor agencies which charge fees is that they must place the entire cost of the service upon those least able to bear it. Employment agents say that employers will not pay the fees; hence they must charge the employees. Among the wage earners, too, however, those who are least in need and can wait for work pay the least for jobs and even get them free, while those who are most in need make up for all the rest and pay the highest fees. The weakest and poorest classes of wage earners are therefore made to pay the largest share for a service rendered to employers, to workers, and to the public as well."

2. The Remedies

During the fifteen years preceding 1914, there had been extensive experimentation in the regulation of private employment agencies. Twenty-four states had attempted direct regulation under statutes, often supplemented by municipal ordinances. Nineteen states had attempted indirect regulation through the competition of state offices, and seven others through competition of municipal offices. Other experiments in indirect regulation through competition petition were made by voluntary organizations, philanthropic, social, and industrial. The results of those experiments were unsatisfactory. The abuses continued in large measure, and the private offices survived to a great extent the competition of the free agencies, public and private. There gradually developed a conviction that the evils of private agencies were inherent and ineradicable so long as they were permitted to charge fees to the workers seeking employment. And many believed that such charges were the root of the evil.

On September 25, 1914, the American Association of Public Employment Offices adopted at its annual meeting the following resolutions:

"Resolved, That this association go on record as favoring the elimination as soon as possible, of all private employment agencies operating for a profit within the United States, and that it recommends to the consideration of the United States Commission on Industrial Relations and Congress and the various state legislatures legislation having this end in view."

The United States Commission on Industrial Relations declared in its report to Congress:

"24. Attempts to remove these abuses by regulation have been made in thirty-one states, but, with few exceptions, they have proved futile, and at most they have served only to promote a higher standard of honesty in the business, and have not removed the other abuses which are inherent in the system. Where the states and cities have spent much money for inspectors and complaint adjusters, there has been considerable improvement in the methods of private employment agencies, but most of the officers in charge of this regulation testify that the abuses are in 'the nature of the business,' and never can be entirely eliminated. They therefore favor the total abolition of private labor agencies. This is also the common opinion among working people, and in the several states, attempts have already been made to accomplish this by law."

But the remedies proposed were not limited to the suppression of private offices charging fees to workers and the extension of the system of state and municipal offices. The conviction became widespread that, for the solution of the larger problem of unemployment, the aid of the federal government and the utilization and development of its extensive machinery was indispensable. During the seven years preceding 1914, a beginning had been made in this respect. The Immigration Act of February 20, 1907, c. 1134, 34 Stat. 898, 909, created within the Bureau of Immigration and Naturalization a Division of Information, charged with the duty of promoting "a beneficial distribution of aliens." The services rendered by this division included, among others, some commonly performed by employment agencies. While it undertook to place in positions of employment only aliens, its operations were national in scope. The Act of March 4, 1913, creating the Department of Labor, resulted in a transfer of the Bureau of Immigration, including the Division of Information, to that department (37 Stat. 736). By this transfer, the scope of the division's work was enlarged to correspond with the broad powers of the Labor Department. These were declared by Congress to be:

"to foster, promote and develop the welfare of the wage earners of the United States, to improve their working conditions, and to advance their opportunities for profitable employment."

Then its efforts "to distribute" (that is, both to supply and to find places for) labor were extended to include citizens as well as aliens, and much was done to develop the machinery necessary for such distribution. In the summer of 1914, and in part before the filing in the State of Washington of the proposal for legislation here in question, action had been taken by the Department of Labor which attracted public attention. It undertook to supply harvest hands needed in the Middle West, and also to find work for the factory hands thrown out of employment by the great fire at Salem, Massachusetts, June 25, 1914. The division was strengthened by cooperation with other departments of the federal government (Agriculture, Interior, Commerce, and the Post office, with its 60,000 local offices) and with state and municipal employment offices. As early as June 13, 1914, the United States Department of Labor had also sought the cooperation in this work of all the leading newspapers in America, including those printed in foreign languages.

3. Conditions in the State of Washington

The peculiar needs of Washington emphasized the defects of the system of private employment offices.

(a) The Evils.

The conditions generally prevailing are described in a report recently published by the United States Department of Labor, thus:

"In no part of the United States, perhaps, is there so large a field for employment offices as in the Pacific states. As has been noted, industrial conditions there favor inconstancy of employment. Much of the business activity is based upon the casual, short-time job. This in itself means the frequent shifting of workers from place to place. And the shifting is the more difficult as much of the work offered is in more or less remote districts of the country... ."

"The necessity laid upon so many workers of constantly seeking new jobs opens a peculiarly fertile field for their exploitation by unscrupulous private employment agencies. There is much testimony to the fact and frequency of such exploitation. The most striking evidence of this is that, in the State of Washington, private agencies made themselves so generally distrusted that, in 1915, their complete abolition was ordered by popular vote... ."

"Prior to 1914, there was practically no legislation regarding private employment agencies, and there had been no attempt at state supervision of their conduct. But distrust of such agencies was constantly increasing, and culminated in the year mentioned in the passage by popular initiative of an act aiming at the total suppression of all private employment agencies of the commercial type."

The reports of the Washington State Bureau of Labor give this description:

"The investigations of the Bureau show that the worst labor conditions in the state are to be found on highway and railroad construction work, and these are largely because the men are sent long distances by the employment agencies, are housed and fed poorly at the camps, and are paid on an average of $1.75 to $2.25 a day, out of which they are compelled to pay $5.50 to $7 per week for board, generally a hospital fee of some kind, always a fee to the employment agency, and their transportation to the point where the work is being done. The consequence is that they usually have but little money left when the work is finished, and if, as frequently happens, they work only a week or two and are then discharged, they are in as bad a situation as they were before they went to work, and sometimes worse, if they do not have enough money to get back to the place from which they started."

"That the honest toiler was their victim there is no question: not alone of a stiff fee for the information given, but a systematic method was adopted in order to keep the business going. Managers of agencies and managers of jobs, their superintendents, foremen, or subforemen were in this scheme for fleecing the workingman. Men in large numbers would be sent to contract jobs, and if on the railroads, 'free fare' was part of the inducement, or perhaps the agency would charge a nominal fee if the distance was great, and this, too, would become a perquisite of the bureau, to finally go through the clearing house. In many cases, men would be unsatisfactory – at least they would be told so, discharged in a few days, and sent adrift as poor, may be poorer, than when they came there. New men would have to be secured, and thus the thing would go on revolving. So it went until at last it became so obnoxious that the public indignation was at length aroused, resulting in the passing of a law doing away with them."

The abuses and the inadequacy of the then existing system are also described by state officials in affidavits included in the record.

(b) The Remedies.

Washington had not tried direct regulation of private employment offices, but that method was being considered as late as 1912. Its people had had, on the other hand, exceptional opportunities of testing public employment offices. The municipal employment office established at Seattle in 1894 under an amendment of the city charter is among the oldest public offices in the United States. Tacoma established a municipal office in 1904, Spokane in 1905, and Everett in 1908. The continuance and increase of these municipal offices indicate that their experience in public employment agencies was at least encouraging. And the low cost of operating them was extraordinary. In Spokane, the fees charged by private agencies ranged from $1 upward, and were usually about $2. In the Seattle free municipal agency, the cost of operation, per position filled, was reduced to a trifle over 4 cents. The preliminary steps for establishing "Distribution Stations" under the federal system, including one at Seattle, had been taken before the passage of the Washington law. Later, branch offices were established in thirteen other cities.

4. The fundamental problem

The problem which confronted the people of Washington was far more comprehensive and fundamental than that of protecting workers applying to the private agencies. It was the chronic problem of unemployment – perhaps the gravest and most difficult problem of modern industry – the problem which, owing to business depression, was the most acute in America during the years 1913 to 1915. In the State of Washington, the suffering from unemployment was accentuated by the lack of staple industries operating continuously throughout the year and by unusual fluctuations in the demand for labor, with consequent reduction of wages and increase of social unrest. Students of the larger problem of unemployment appear to agree that establishment of an adequate system of employment offices or labor exchanges is an indispensable first step toward its solution. There is reason to believe that the people of Washington not only considered the collection by the private employment offices of fees from employees a social injustice, but that they considered the elimination of the practice a necessary preliminary to the establishment of a constructive policy for dealing with the subject of unemployment.

It is facts and considerations like these which may have led the people of Washington to prohibit the collection by employment agencies of fees from applicants for work. And weight should be given to the fact that the statute has been held constitutional by the Supreme Court of Washington and by the federal district court (three judges sitting) – courts presumably familiar with the local conditions and needs.

Insofar as protection of the applicant is a specific purpose of the statute, a precedent was furnished by the Act of Congress, December 21, 1898, 30 Stat. 755, 763 (considered in Patterson v. The Eudora, 190 U. S. 169), which provides, among other things:

"If any person shall demand or receive, either directly or indirectly, from any seaman or other person seeking employment as seaman, or from any person on his behalf, any remuneration whatever for providing him with employment, he shall for every such offense be liable to a penalty of not more than $100."

Insofar as the statute may be regarded as a step in the effort to overcome industrial maladjustment and unemployment by shifting to the employer the payment of fees, if any, the action taken may be likened to that embodied in the Washington Workmen's Compensation Law (sustained in Mountain Timber Co. v. Washington, 243 U. S. 219), whereby the financial burden of industrial accidents is required to be borne by the employers.

As was said in Holden v. Hardy, 169 U. S. 366, 169 U. S. 387:

"In view of the fact that, from the day Magna Charta was signed to the present moment, amendments to the structure of the law have been made with increasing frequency, it is impossible to suppose that they will not continue, and the law be forced to adapt itself to new conditions of society, and particularly to the new relations between employers and employees as they arise."

In my opinion, the judgment of the district court should be affirmed.

Mr Justice Holmes and Mr Justice Clarke concurred.

== Importance ==
=== International Labour Organization policy ===
Probably inspired by the dissenting judgments in this case, the International Labour Organization's first ever Recommendation took on the views of Justice Brandeis. The Unemployment Recommendation, 1919 (No.1), Art. 1 called for each member to,

take measures to prohibit the establishment of employment agencies which charge fees or which carry on their business for profit. Where such agencies already exist, it is further recommended that they be permitted to operate only under government licenses, and that all practicable measures be taken to abolish such agencies as soon as possible.

The Unemployment Convention, 1919, Art. 2 instead required the alternative of,

a system of free public employment agencies under the control of a central authority. Committees, which shall include representatives of employers and workers, shall be appointed to advise on matters concerning the carrying on of these agencies.

In 1933 the Fee-Charging Employment Agencies Convention (No.34) formally called for abolition. The exception was if the agencies were licensed and a fee scale was agreed in advance. In 1949 a new revised Convention (No.96) was produced. This kept the same scheme, but secured an 'opt out' (Art.2) for members that did not wish to sign up. Agencies were an increasingly entrenched part of the labor market. The United States did not sign up to the Conventions. The latest Convention, the Private Employment Agencies Convention, 1997 takes a much softer stance and calls merely for regulation.

=== Supreme Court policy ===
In Ribnik v. McBride, 277 U.S. 350 (1928), the Court struck down a similar New Jersey law attempting to regulate agencies, Justices Stone, Brandeis and Holmes dissenting. This is probably no longer good law.

Doubt was placed on the leading dicta of Adams v. Tanner in Olsen v. State of Nebraska, 313 U.S. 236 (1941), and Lincoln Union v. Northwestern Co., 335 U.S. 525, 535 (1949). In the latter, Mr Justice Black said that Adams v. Tanner was part of the "constitutional philosophy" that struck down minimum wages and maximum working hours.

== See also ==
- List of United States Supreme Court cases, volume 244
- Olsen v. Nebraska (1941)
- United Kingdom agency worker law
- Temporary work
