= Muskrat v. United States =

- Supreme Court of the United States

Argued November 30, 1910 Decided January 23, 1911
- Full case name: David Muskrat and J. Henry Dick v. United States
- Citations: 219 U.S. 346 (more) 31 S. Ct. 250; 55 L. Ed. 246; 1911 U.S. LEXIS 1641

Case history
- Prior: Dismissed, 44 Ct. Cl. 137 (1909)
- Subsequent: None

Holding
- Article III of the Constitution limits the jurisdiction of the Court to actual controversies between adverse parties; there is no controversy or adversity where an interested party colludes with a disinterested party to bring the suit solely for the purpose of determining the constitutionality of a particular act of Congress. Court of Claims affirmed.

Court membership
- Chief Justice Edward D. White Associate Justices John M. Harlan · Joseph McKenna; Oliver W. Holmes Jr. · William R. Day; Horace H. Lurton · Charles E. Hughes; Willis Van Devanter · Joseph R. Lamar

Case opinion
- Majority: Day, joined by unanimous

Laws applied
- U.S. Const. art. III

Muskrat v. United States, 219 U.S. 346 (1911), was a landmark United States Supreme Court case in which the Court delineated the authority of United States federal courts to hear certain kinds of cases under the Case or Controversy Clause of the United States Constitution.

== Facts ==
In this case, Congress passed a statute permitting certain Native Americans to bring suits against the United States to determine the constitutionality of a law allocating tribal lands, and providing that Counsel for both sides were to be paid from the United States Treasury. Several cases were brought pursuant to this statute, including suits brought by David Muskrat and J. Henry Dick opposing the partition of Indian lands, and by another pair, William Brown and Levi B. Gritts, opposing a prohibition against the sale of certain Indian lands.

== Result ==
The United States Supreme Court refused to allow the case to be heard, maintaining that, though the United States was named as a defendant, the case in question was not an actual controversy: rather, the statute was merely devised to test the constitutionality of a certain type of legislation, and the Court's ruling would be nothing more than an advisory opinion; therefore, it dismissed the suit for failing to present a "case or controversy", as required by Article III of the United States Constitution.

== Later developments ==
Although this decision remains as valid case law, its effective precedent has been diminished by the Supreme Court's approval of the declaratory judgment act, which permits a party to seek a declaration of rights against another party, even where no affirmative relief (e.g. damages or an injunction) is being sought. In a declaratory judgment action, if under the facts as proved, there is some possibility of a future need for relief as among the parties, a declaratory judgment may be entered.

== See also ==
- List of United States Supreme Court cases, volume 219
- Hayburn's Case, 2 U.S. 409 (1792)
- Re Judiciary and Navigation Acts (1921), similar ruling of the High Court of Australia
