= Houston East & West Texas Railway Co. v. United States =

Houston E. & W. T. Ry. Co. v. United States
- Supreme Court of the United States

Argued October 28–29, 1913 Decided June 8, 1914
- Full case name: Houston, East & West Texas Railway Company and Houston & Shreveport Railroad Company et al., Appellants, v. United States, the Interstate Commerce Commission et al., No. 567, and Texas & Pacific Railway Company et al., Appellants, v. United States, the Interstate Commerce Commission et al., No. 568.
- Citations: 234 U.S. 342 (more) 34 S. Ct. 833; 58 L. Ed. 1341

Holding
- Congressional authority necessarily embraces the right to control operations in all matters having a close and substantial relation to interstate traffic, to the efficiency of interstate service, and to the maintenance of conditions under which interstate commerce may be conducted upon fair terms.

Court membership
- Chief Justice Edward D. White Associate Justices Joseph McKenna · Oliver W. Holmes Jr. William R. Day · Horace H. Lurton; Charles E. Hughes · Willis Van Devanter; Joseph R. Lamar · Mahlon Pitney

Case opinions
- Majority: Hughes
- Dissent: Lurton (unwritten)
- Dissent: Pitney (unwritten)

Houston East & West Texas Railway Co. v. United States, 234 U.S. 342 (1914), also known as the Shreveport Rate Case, was a decision of the United States Supreme Court expanding the power of the Commerce Clause of the Constitution of the United States. Justice Hughes's majority opinion stated that the federal government's power to regulate interstate commerce also allowed it to regulate purely intrastate commerce in cases where control of the former was not possible without control of the latter. Because the Supreme Court consolidated several related appeals, they are sometimes collectively known as the "Shreveport Rate Cases" although the Supreme Court issued only one ruling.

== Background ==
The Houston East and West Texas Railway Company managed an interstate railway line that ran through Dallas and Marshall, Texas (on the eastern border of Texas), and Shreveport, Louisiana. The freight shipping rates "on wagons" from Marshall to Dallas, a distance of 148 miles, was 36.8 cents, and the rate from Marshall to Shreveport, a distance of 42 miles, was 56 cents; the rates for other goods and from other points in Texas showed a similar imbalance. Shreveport competed with Dallas for shipments from East Texas, but the skewed price structure (mandated by the Texas Railroad Commission), greatly favored shipments to and from Dallas over Shreveport. The Interstate Commerce Commission, acting on a complaint from the Railroad Commission of Louisiana, found that "an unlawful and undue preference and advantage" was thereby given to the Texas cities, ordered the company to change the rate structure to end discriminatory pricing.

The Tenth Amendment reserves for the states or the people all powers not expressly delegated to the federal government.

The US Constitution gives Congress the power to regulate interstate commerce. The regulation of commerce that is completely within a state is not an enumerated power of the federal government. In effect, the Interstate Commerce Commission was attempting to set the rate that the railroad could charge from Dallas to Marshall, a section of rail line completely within the borders of Texas. The issue was thus whether "Congress is impotent to control the intrastate charges of an interstate carrier" or whether Congress could go further or if it was necessary to regulate interstate commerce.

== Decision ==
Associate Justice Charles Evans Hughes, writing for the majority, rejected the railroad's argument, finding that congressional authority "necessarily embraces the right to control... operations in all matters having a close and substantial relation to interstate traffic, to the efficiency of interstate service, and to the maintenance of conditions under which interstate commerce may be conducted upon fair terms." Regulation of the intrastate line was a means to the end of regulating interstate commerce, and was therefore allowed.

Two justices, Lurton and Pitney, dissented without issuing a written opinion.

== Legacy ==
The Interstate Commerce Clause has been used to steadily expand the power of the federal government, as almost any aspect of life, especially after the Industrial Revolution, can in some way be related to interstate commerce. The Shreveport Rate Case was an early example of this expansion.

As a leading case in the ability of governments to regulate activities occurring only within single subdivisions, on the grounds that those activities affect regulation on a larger scale, the Shreveport Rate Cases have been cited in many subsequent rulings, both in the United States and in other countries.

== See also ==
- List of United States Supreme Court cases, volume 234
