= List of United States Supreme Court cases, volume 234 =

Supreme Court of the United States
- Interactive map of Supreme Court of the United States
- 38°53′26″N 77°00′16″W
- Established: March 4, 1789; 236 years ago
- Location: Washington, D.C.
- Coordinates: 38°53′26″N 77°00′16″W
- Composition method: Presidential nomination with Senate confirmation
- Authorised by: Constitution of the United States, Art. III, § 1
- Judge term length: life tenure, subject to impeachment and removal
- Number of positions: 9 (by statute)
- Website: supremecourt.gov

This is a list of cases reported in volume 234 of United States Reports, decided by the Supreme Court of the United States in 1914.

== Justices of the Supreme Court at the time of volume 234 U.S. ==
The Supreme Court is established by Article III, Section 1 of the Constitution of the United States, which says: "The judicial Power of the United States, shall be vested in one supreme Court . . .". The size of the Court is not specified; the Constitution leaves it to Congress to set the number of justices. Under the Judiciary Act of 1789 Congress originally fixed the number of justices at six (one chief justice and five associate justices). Since 1789 Congress has varied the size of the Court from six to seven, nine, ten, and back to nine justices (always including one chief justice).

When the cases in volume 234 were decided the Court comprised the following nine members:

Portrait	Justice	Office	Home State	Succeeded	Date confirmed by the Senate (Vote)	Tenure on Supreme Court
	Edward Douglass White	Chief Justice	Louisiana	Melville Fuller	December 12, 1910 (Acclamation)	December 19, 1910 – May 19, 1921 (Died)
	Joseph McKenna	Associate Justice	California	Stephen Johnson Field	January 21, 1898 (Acclamation)	January 26, 1898 – January 5, 1925 (Retired)
	Oliver Wendell Holmes Jr.	Associate Justice	Massachusetts	Horace Gray	December 4, 1902 (Acclamation)	December 8, 1902 – January 12, 1932 (Retired)
	William R. Day	Associate Justice	Ohio	George Shiras Jr.	February 23, 1903 (Acclamation)	March 2, 1903 – November 13, 1922 (Retired)
	Horace Harmon Lurton	Associate Justice	Tennessee	Rufus W. Peckham	December 20, 1909 (Acclamation)	January 3, 1910 – July 12, 1914 (Died)
	Charles Evans Hughes	Associate Justice	New York	David Josiah Brewer	May 2, 1910 (Acclamation)	October 10, 1910 – June 10, 1916 (Resigned)
	Willis Van Devanter	Associate Justice	Wyoming	Edward Douglass White (as Associate Justice)	December 15, 1910 (Acclamation)	January 3, 1911 – June 2, 1937 (Retired)
	Joseph Rucker Lamar	Associate Justice	Georgia	William Henry Moody	December 15, 1910 (Acclamation)	January 3, 1911 – January 2, 1916 (Died)
	Mahlon Pitney	Associate Justice	New Jersey	John Marshall Harlan	March 13, 1912 (50–26)	March 18, 1912 – December 31, 1922 (Resigned)

== Notable Cases in 234 U.S. ==
=== Shreveport Rate Cases ===
In the Shreveport Rate Cases, 234 U.S. 342 (1914), the Supreme Court interpreted Congress's power under the Commerce Clause of the Constitution of the United States. The Court held that the federal government's power to regulate interstate commerce also allowed it to regulate purely intrastate commerce when control of the former was not possible without control of the latter. Because the Court consolidated several related appeals, they are sometimes collectively known as the "Shreveport Rate Cases" although the Court issued only one ruling.

== Citation style ==
Under the Judiciary Act of 1789 the federal court structure at the time comprised District Courts, which had general trial jurisdiction; Circuit Courts, which had mixed trial and appellate (from the US District Courts) jurisdiction; and the United States Supreme Court, which had appellate jurisdiction over the federal District and Circuit courts—and for certain issues over state courts. The Supreme Court also had limited original jurisdiction (i.e., in which cases could be filed directly with the Supreme Court without first having been heard by a lower federal or state court). There were one or more federal District Courts and/or Circuit Courts in each state, territory, or other geographical region.

The Judiciary Act of 1891 created the United States Courts of Appeals and reassigned the jurisdiction of most routine appeals from the district and circuit courts to these appellate courts. The Act created nine new courts that were originally known as the "United States Circuit Courts of Appeals." The new courts had jurisdiction over most appeals of lower court decisions. The Supreme Court could review either legal issues that a court of appeals certified or decisions of court of appeals by writ of certiorari.

On January 1, 1912, the effective date of the Judicial Code of 1911, the old Circuit Courts were abolished, with their remaining trial court jurisdiction transferred to the U.S. District Courts.

Bluebook citation style is used for case names, citations, and jurisdictions.

- "# Cir." = United States Court of Appeals
  - e.g., "3d Cir." = United States Court of Appeals for the Third Circuit
- "C.C.D." = United States Circuit Court for the District of . . .
  - e.g.,"C.C.D.N.J." = United States Circuit Court for the District of New Jersey
- "D." = United States District Court for the District of . . .
  - e.g.,"D. Mass." = United States District Court for the District of Massachusetts
- "E." = Eastern; "M." = Middle; "N." = Northern; "S." = Southern; "W." = Western
  - e.g.,"C.C.S.D.N.Y." = United States Circuit Court for the Southern District of New York
  - e.g.,"M.D. Ala." = United States District Court for the Middle District of Alabama
- "Ct. Cl." = United States Court of Claims
- The abbreviation of a state's name alone indicates the highest appellate court in that state's judiciary at the time.
  - e.g.,"Pa." = Supreme Court of Pennsylvania
  - e.g.,"Me." = Supreme Judicial Court of Maine

== List of cases in volume 234 U.S. ==
Case Name	Page & year	Opinion of the Court	Concurring opinion(s)	Dissenting opinion(s)	Lower Court	Disposition
Tap Line Cases	1 (1914)	Day	none	none	Comm. Ct.	affirmed
United States v. Butler C.R.R. Co.	29 (1914)	Day	none	none	Comm. Ct.	affirmed
United States v. Axman	36 (1914)	Day	none	none	9th Cir.	affirmed
Louisville & N.R.R. Co. v. Woodford	46 (1914)	Day	none	none	Ky.	dismissed
Atlantic T. Co. v. Imbrovek	52 (1914)	Hughes	none	none	4th Cir.	affirmed
Atlantic T. Co. v. Maryland ex rel. Szczesek	63 (1914)	Hughes	none	none	4th Cir.	affirmed
Schmidt v. Bank of Comm.	64 (1914)	Hughes	none	none	N.M.	reversed
Ex parte Roe	70 (1914)	VanDevanter	none	none	E.D. Tex.	mandamus denied
Taylor v. Anderson	74 (1914)	VanDevanter	none	none	C.C.E.D. Okla.	affirmed
Washington S. Co. v. United States	76 (1914)	VanDevanter	none	none	9th Cir.	affirmed
New Orleans & N.R.R. Co. v. National R.M. Co.	80 (1914)	VanDevanter	none	none	La.	dismissed
Wabash R.R. Co. v. Hayes	86 (1914)	VanDevanter	none	none	Ill. App. Ct.	dismissed
Ocampo v. United States	91 (1914)	Pitney	none	none	Phil.	affirmed
Carlson v. Washington ex rel. Curtiss	103 (1914)	Pitney	none	none	Wash.	affirmed
Virginia v. West Virginia	117 (1914)	White	none	none	original	answer allowed
Manhattan L. Ins. Co. v. Cohen	123 (1914)	White	none	none	Tex. Civ. App.	dismissed
Texas et al. R.R. Co. v. American T. & T. Co.	138 (1914)	White	none	none	5th Cir.	reversed
New York Life Ins. Co. v. Head I	149 (1914)	White	none	none	Mo.	reversed
New York Life Ins. Co. v. Head II	166 (1914)	White	none	none	Mo.	reversed
Florida et al. R.R. Co. v. United States	167 (1914)	White	none	none	Comm. Ct.	reversed
Van Dyke v. Cordova C. Co.	188 (1914)	White	none	none	Ariz.	dismissed
Mullen v. Simmons	192 (1914)	McKenna	none	none	Okla.	reversed
International H. Co. v. Missouri	199 (1914)	McKenna	none	none	Mo.	affirmed
International H. Co. v. Kentucky I	216 (1914)	Holmes	none	none	Ky.	reversed
Keokee C.C. Co. v. Taylor	224 (1914)	Holmes	none	none	Va.	affirmed
United States v. Buffalo P. Co.	228 (1914)	Day	none	none	2d Cir.	affirmed
United States v. United et al. Co.	236 (1914)	Day	none	none	Ct. Cl.	affirmed
United States v. First Nat'l Bank	245 (1914)	Day	none	none	8th Cir.	affirmed
Lazarus M. & L. v. Prentice	263 (1914)	Day	none	none	5th Cir.	dismissed
Stone et al. Co. v. United States	270 (1914)	Lurton	none	none	5th Cir.	reversed
Atlantic C.L.R.R. Co. v. Georgia	280 (1914)	Hughes	none	none	Ga. Ct. App.	affirmed
Los Angeles Switching Case	294 (1914)	Hughes	none	none	Comm. Ct.	reversed
ICC v. Southern P. Co.	315 (1914)	Hughes	none	none	Comm. Ct.	reversed
Port Richmond et al. Co. v. Hudson County	317 (1914)	Hughes	none	none	N.J.	affirmed
City of Sault Ste. Marie v. International T. Co.	333 (1914)	Hughes	none	none	W.D. Mich.	affirmed
Shreveport Rate Cases	342 (1914)	Hughes	none	none	Comm. Ct.	affirmed
Citizens B. Co. v. Ravenna Nat'l Bank	360 (1914)	VanDevanter	none	none	6th Cir.	certification
Louisville & N.R.R. Co. v. Western Union T. Co.	369 (1914)	VanDevanter	none	none	S.D. Miss.	reversed
Gilson v. United States	380 (1914)	Pitney	none	none	9th Cir.	affirmed
Grannis v. Ordean	385 (1914)	Pitney	none	none	Minn.	affirmed
Dale v. Pattison	399 (1914)	Pitney	none	none	6th Cir.	affirmed
Missouri et al. R.R. Co. v. Harris	412 (1914)	Pitney	none	none	Hopkins Cnty. Justice Ct.	affirmed
Johnson v. Gearlds	422 (1914)	Pitney	none	none	D. Minn.	reversed
Equitable S. Co. v. United States ex rel. McMillan	448 (1914)	Pitney	none	none	D.C. Cir.	certification
Missouri P.R.R. Co. v. Larabee	459 (1914)	White	none	none	Kan.	reversed
Intermountain Rate Cases	476 (1914)	White	none	none	Comm. Ct.	reversed
United States v. Union P.R.R. Co.	495 (1914)	White	none	none	Comm. Ct.	reversed
Illinois ex rel. Dunne v. Economy et al. Co.	497 (1914)	McKenna	none	none	Ill.	dismissed
Lane v. Watts	525 (1914)	McKenna	none	none	D.C. Cir.	affirmed
Western Union T. Co. v. Brown	542 (1914)	Holmes	none	none	S.C.	reversed
Pipe Line Cases	548 (1914)	Holmes	White	McKenna	Comm. Ct.	multiple
Charleston et al. R.R. Co. v. Thompson	576 (1914)	Holmes	none	none	Ga. Ct. App.	reversed
International H. Co. v. Kentucky II	579 (1914)	Day	none	none	Ky.	affirmed
International H. Co. v. Kentucky III	589 (1914)	Day	none	none	Ky.	reversed
Louisville & N.R.R. Co. v. Higdon	592 (1914)	Day	none	none	Ky.	affirmed
Eastern et al. Ass'n v. United States	600 (1914)	Day	none	none	S.D.N.Y.	affirmed
Jones v. Jones	615 (1914)	Lurton	none	none	Tenn.	affirmed
Moore M.C. Co. v. Electrical I. Co.	619 (1914)	Lurton	none	none	D. Ind.	dismissed
Louisiana v. McAdoo	627 (1914)	Lurton	none	none	original	leave denied
Collins v. Kentucky	634 (1914)	Hughes	none	none	Ky.	reversed
Malone v. Kentucky	639 (1914)	Hughes	none	none	Ky.	reversed
Order St. B. v. Steinhauser	640 (1914)	Hughes	none	none	8th Cir.	reversed
Selig v. Hamilton	652 (1914)	Hughes	none	none	S.D.N.Y.	affirmed
Chapman & D.L. Co. v. St. Francis L. Dist.	667 (1914)	VanDevanter	none	none	Ark.	rehearing denied
Burke v. Southern P.R.R. Co.	669 (1914)	VanDevanter	none	none	9th Cir.	certification
Hall v. Burr	712 (1914)	Pitney	none	none	1st Cir.	affirmed
Southern R.R. Co. v. Crockett	725 (1914)	Pitney	none	none	Tenn.	affirmed
Roller v. Murray	738 (1914)	Pitney	none	none	W. Va.	dismissed
