= List of United States Supreme Court cases, volume 244 =

Supreme Court of the United States
- Interactive map of Supreme Court of the United States
- 38°53′26″N 77°00′16″W
- Established: March 4, 1789; 237 years ago
- Location: Washington, D.C.
- Coordinates: 38°53′26″N 77°00′16″W
- Composition method: Presidential nomination with Senate confirmation
- Authorised by: Constitution of the United States, Art. III, § 1
- Judge term length: life tenure, subject to impeachment and removal
- Number of positions: 9 (by statute)
- Website: supremecourt.gov

This is a list of the reported in volume 244 of United States Reports, decided by the Supreme Court of the United States in 1917.

== Justices of the Supreme Court at the time of volume 244 U.S. ==
The Supreme Court is established by Article III, Section 1 of the Constitution of the United States, which says: "The judicial Power of the United States, shall be vested in one supreme Court . . .". The size of the Court is not specified; the Constitution leaves it to Congress to set the number of justices. Under the Judiciary Act of 1789 Congress originally fixed the number of justices at six (one chief justice and five associate justices). Since 1789 Congress has varied the size of the Court from six to seven, nine, ten, and back to nine justices (always including one chief justice).

When the cases in volume 244 were decided the Court comprised the following nine members:

Portrait	Justice	Office	Home State	Succeeded	Date confirmed by the Senate (Vote)	Tenure on Supreme Court
	Edward Douglass White	Chief Justice	Louisiana	Melville Fuller	December 12, 1910 (Acclamation)	December 19, 1910 – May 19, 1921 (Died)
	Joseph McKenna	Associate Justice	California	Stephen Johnson Field	January 21, 1898 (Acclamation)	January 26, 1898 – January 5, 1925 (Retired)
	Oliver Wendell Holmes Jr.	Associate Justice	Massachusetts	Horace Gray	December 4, 1902 (Acclamation)	December 8, 1902 – January 12, 1932 (Retired)
	William R. Day	Associate Justice	Ohio	George Shiras Jr.	February 23, 1903 (Acclamation)	March 2, 1903 – November 13, 1922 (Retired)
	Willis Van Devanter	Associate Justice	Wyoming	Edward Douglass White (as Associate Justice)	December 15, 1910 (Acclamation)	January 3, 1911 – June 2, 1937 (Retired)
	Mahlon Pitney	Associate Justice	New Jersey	John Marshall Harlan	March 13, 1912 (50–26)	March 18, 1912 – December 31, 1922 (Resigned)
	James Clark McReynolds	Associate Justice	Tennessee	Horace Harmon Lurton	August 29, 1914 (44–6)	October 12, 1914 – January 31, 1941 (Retired)
	Louis Brandeis	Associate Justice	Massachusetts	Joseph Rucker Lamar	June 1, 1916 (47–22)	June 5, 1916 – February 13, 1939 (Retired)
	John Hessin Clarke	Associate Justice	Ohio	Charles Evans Hughes	July 24, 1916 (Acclamation)	October 9, 1916 – September 18, 1922 (Retired)

== Citation style ==
Under the Judiciary Act of 1789 the federal court structure at the time comprised District Courts, which had general trial jurisdiction; Circuit Courts, which had mixed trial and appellate (from the US District Courts) jurisdiction; and the United States Supreme Court, which had appellate jurisdiction over the federal District and Circuit courts—and for certain issues over state courts. The Supreme Court also had limited original jurisdiction (i.e., in which cases could be filed directly with the Supreme Court without first having been heard by a lower federal or state court). There were one or more federal District Courts and/or Circuit Courts in each state, territory, or other geographical region.

The Judiciary Act of 1891 created the United States Courts of Appeals and reassigned the jurisdiction of most routine appeals from the district and circuit courts to these appellate courts. The Act created nine new courts that were originally known as the "United States Circuit Courts of Appeals." The new courts had jurisdiction over most appeals of lower court decisions. The Supreme Court could review either legal issues that a court of appeals certified or decisions of court of appeals by writ of certiorari. On January 1, 1912, the effective date of the Judicial Code of 1911, the old Circuit Courts were abolished, with their remaining trial court jurisdiction transferred to the U.S. District Courts.

Bluebook citation style is used for case names, citations, and jurisdictions.

- "# Cir." = United States Court of Appeals
  - e.g., "3d Cir." = United States Court of Appeals for the Third Circuit
- "D." = United States District Court for the District of . . .
  - e.g.,"D. Mass." = United States District Court for the District of Massachusetts
- "E." = Eastern; "M." = Middle; "N." = Northern; "S." = Southern; "W." = Western
  - e.g.,"M.D. Ala." = United States District Court for the Middle District of Alabama
- "Ct. Cl." = United States Court of Claims
- The abbreviation of a state's name alone indicates the highest appellate court in that state's judiciary at the time.
  - e.g.,"Pa." = Supreme Court of Pennsylvania
  - e.g.,"Me." = Supreme Judicial Court of Maine

== List of cases in volume 244 U.S. ==
Case Name	Page and year	Opinion of the Court	Concurring opinion(s)	Dissenting opinion(s)	Lower Court	Disposition
Ewing v. United States ex rel. Fowler Car Company	1 (1917)	McKenna	none	none	D.C. Cir.	reversed
The Kronprinzessin Cecilie	12 (1917)	Holmes	none	none	1st Cir.	reversed
Chicago Life Insurance Company v. Cherry	25 (1917)	Holmes	none	none	Ill. App.	affirmed
Gulf, Colorado and Santa Fe Railway Company v. Texas Packing Company	31 (1917)	Day	none	none	Tex. Civ. App.	affirmed
Van Dyke v. Geary	39 (1917)	Brandeis	none	none	D. Ariz.	affirmed
Toledo Railways and Light Company v. Hill	49 (1917)	White	none	none	S.D.N.Y.	reversed
Meisukas v. Greenough Red Ash Coal Company	54 (1917)	White	none	none	E.D.N.Y.	affirmed
American Express Company v. United States Horse Shoe Company	58 (1917)	White	none	none	Pa.	reversed
Minneapolis and St. Louis Railway Company v. Gotschall	66 (1917)	White	none	none	Minn.	affirmed
Ohio River Contract Company v. Gordon	68 (1917)	White	none	none	Ky.	affirmed
Chesbrough v. Woodworth	72 (1917)	McKenna	none	none	6th Cir.	affirmed
Woodworth v. Chesbrough	79 (1917)	McKenna	none	none	6th Cir.	dismissed
United States v. Illinois Central Railroad Company	82 (1917)	McKenna	none	none	E.D. Ill.	reversed
West v. Rutledge Timber Company	90 (1917)	McKenna	none	none	9th Cir.	affirmed
E.I. Du Pont de Nemours Powder Company v. Masland	100 (1917)	Holmes	none	none	3d Cir.	reversed
Nevada–California–Oregon Railway Company v. Burris	103 (1917)	Holmes	none	none	Nev.	dismissed
Rowland v. Boyle	106 (1917)	Holmes	none	none	E.D. Ark.	affirmed
United States v. Wildcat	111 (1917)	Day	none	none	8th Cir.	affirmed
Yankaus v. Feltenstein	127 (1917)	Day	none	none	City Ct. of N.Y.C.	affirmed
Lewis v. United States	134 (1917)	Day	none	none	Ct. Cl.	affirmed
New York Central Railroad Company v. Winfield	147 (1917)	VanDevanter	none	Brandeis	N.Y. Sup. Ct.	reversed
Erie Railroad Company v. Winfield	170 (1917)	VanDevanter	none	none	N.J.	reversed
Lane v. Hoglund	174 (1917)	VanDevanter	none	none	D.C. Cir.	affirmed
Lehigh Valley Railroad Company v. Barlow	183 (1917)	McReynolds	none	none	N.Y. Sup. Ct.	reversed
Smith v. Third National Exchange Bank of Sandusky	184 (1917)	McReynolds	none	none	N.M.	affirmed
Missouri Pacific Railroad Company v. McGrew Coal Company	191 (1917)	McReynolds	none	none	Mo.	affirmed
Missouri Pacific Railroad Company v. Taber	200 (1917)	McReynolds	none	none	Mo.	dismissed
Valley Steamship Company v. Wattawa	202 (1917)	McReynolds	none	none	Ohio App.	dismissed
Southern Pacific Company v. Jensen	205 (1917)	McReynolds	none	Holmes; Pitney	N.Y. Sup. Ct.	reversed
Clyde Steamship Company v. Walker	255 (1917)	McReynolds	none	none	N.Y. Sup. Ct.	reversed
Sutton v. New Jersey	258 (1917)	Brandeis	none	none	N.J.	affirmed
United Copper Securities Company v. Amalgamated Copper Company	261 (1917)	Brandeis	none	none	2d Cir.	affirmed
Hamer v. New York Railways Company Company	266 (1917)	Brandeis	none	none	S.D.N.Y.	affirmed
Norfolk Southern Railroad Company v. Chatman	276 (1917)	Clarke	none	none	4th Cir.	affirmed
Railroad Supply Company v. Elyria Iron and Steel Company	285 (1917)	Clarke	none	none	6th Cir.	affirmed
Hart Steel Company v. Railroad Supply Company	294 (1917)	Clarke	none	none	7th Cir.	reversed
Cuyahoga River Power Company v. Northern Realty Company	300 (1917)	White	none	none	Ohio App.	dismissed
Doepel v. Jones	305 (1917)	White	none	none	Okla.	affirmed
Seaboard Air Line Railroad Company v. Blackwell	310 (1917)	McKenna	none	none	Ga. App.	reversed
Saunders v. Shaw	317 (1917)	Holmes	none	none	La.	reversed
Erie Railroad Company v. Purucker	320 (1917)	Day	none	none	Ohio App.	affirmed
Farmers Irrigation District v. Nebraska ex rel. O'Shea	325 (1917)	Day	none	none	Neb.	affirmed
Erie Railroad Company v. Stone	332 (1917)	Day	none	none	Ohio App.	reversed
Atchison, Topeka and Santa Fe Railway Company v. United States	336 (1917)	Day	none	none	9th Cir.	affirmed
Western Oil Refining Company v. Lipscomb	346 (1917)	VanDevanter	none	none	Tenn.	reversed
Chicago, Milwaukee and St. Paul Railway Company v. United States	351 (1917)	VanDevanter	none	none	9th Cir.	affirmed
New York Central Railroad Company v. Tonsellito	360 (1917)	McReynolds	none	none	N.J.	multiple
Mason v. United States	362 (1917)	McReynolds	none	none	D. Alaska	affirmed
St. Louis, Iron Mountain and Southern Railway Company v. McKnight	368 (1917)	Brandeis	none	none	8th Cir.	affirmed
Illinois Surety Company v. John Davis Company	376 (1917)	Brandeis	none	none	7th Cir.	affirmed
Missouri, Kansas and Texas Railway Company v. Ward	383 (1917)	Brandeis	none	none	Tex. Civ. App.	affirmed
Mississippi Railroad Commission v. Mobile and Ohio Railroad Company	388 (1917)	Clarke	none	none	S.D. Miss.	affirmed
United States ex rel. Louisiana v. Jack	397 (1917)	Clarke	none	none	5th Cir.	affirmed
Wall v. Parrot Silver and Copper Company	407 (1917)	Clarke	none	none	D. Mont.	affirmed
Ex parte Park Square Automobile Station	412 (1917)	White	none	none	N.D.N.Y.	mandamus denied
First National Bank of Bay City v. Fellows	416 (1917)	White	none	VanDevanter	Mich.	reversed
Valdez v. United States	432 (1917)	McKenna	none	Clarke	Phil.	affirmed
Ex parte Indiana Transportation Company	456 (1917)	Holmes	none	none	not indicated	prohibition granted
Paine Lumber Company, Ltd. v. Neal	459 (1917)	Holmes	none	Pitney	2d Cir.	affirmed
Hopkins v. Walker	486 (1917)	VanDevanter	none	none	D. Mont.	reversed
Santa Fe Pacific Railroad Company v. Lane	492 (1917)	VanDevanter	none	none	D.C. Cir.	reversed
Greene v. Louisville and Interurban Railroad Company	499 (1917)	Pitney	none	none	E.D. Ky.	affirmed
Louisville and Nashville Railroad Company v. Greene	522 (1917)	Pitney	none	none	E.D. Ky.	multiple
Illinois Central Railroad Company v. Greene	555 (1917)	Pitney	none	none	E.D. Ky.	affirmed
Darnell v. Edwards	564 (1917)	Pitney	none	none	S.D. Miss.	affirmed
Southern Railroad Company v. Puckett	571 (1917)	Pitney	none	none	Ga. App.	affirmed
Puget Sound Traction, Light and Power Company v. Reynolds	574 (1917)	Pitney	none	none	W.D. Wash.	affirmed
Lanham v. McKeel	582 (1917)	Pitney	none	none	Okla.	affirmed
McCoach v. Insurance Company of North America	585 (1917)	Pitney	none	none	3d Cir.	reversed
Adams v. Tanner	590 (1917)	McReynolds	none	McKenna; Brandeis	E.D. Wash.	reversed
American Express Company v. South Dakota ex rel. Caldwell	617 (1917)	Brandeis	none	none	S.D.	affirmed
Washington Railway and Electric Company v. Scala	630 (1917)	Clarke	none	none	D.C. Cir.	affirmed
