= Hayburn's Case =

- Supreme Court of the United States

Decided August 11, 1792
- Full case name: Hayburn's Case
- Citations: 2 U.S. 409 (more) 2 Dall. 409; 1 L. Ed. 436; 1792 U.S. LEXIS 591

Holding
- Non-judicial duties cannot be assigned to federal courts in their official capacity.

Court membership
- Chief Justice John Jay Associate Justices James Wilson · William Cushing; John Blair Jr. · James Iredell; Thomas Johnson

Case opinion
- Per curiam

Laws applied
- U.S. Const., Art. III

Hayburn's Case, 2 U.S. (2 Dall.) 409 (1792), was a case in which the Supreme Court of the United States was invited to rule on whether certain non-judicial duties could be assigned by Congress to the federal circuit courts in their official capacity. This was the first time that the Supreme Court addressed the issue of justiciability. Congress eventually reassigned the duties in question, and the Supreme Court never gave judgment in this case.

== Facts and procedural history ==
By the Invalid Pensions Act of 1792, Congress created a scheme for disabled veterans of the American Revolution to apply for pensions to the United States Circuit Courts. The decisions of the courts in such cases were subject to stay by the Secretary of War, pending further action by Congress. Three Circuit Courts balked, on the grounds that the Constitution insulated them from such non-judicial duties and preserved their decisions from correction by the political branches. They communicated their objections in remonstrances to President George Washington, who shared them with Congress. In the following term of the Supreme Court, United States Attorney General Edmund Randolph petitioned for a writ of mandamus commanding the Circuit Court for the District of Pennsylvania to proceed in accordance with the Act. His original petition was made ex officio (lit. "by virtue of the office"), but when the Supreme Court expressed doubts about proceeding in such fashion, he changed his position, averring that he was bringing the petition on behalf of William Hayburn, a pension applicant. At that point, the Supreme Court took the matter under advisement and bound the case over until its next term. While Hayburn's petition was thus pending, Congress intervened with the Act of February 28, 1793, relieving the Circuit Courts of the duty of processing such pension applications.

== Decision ==
The only decision by the Supreme Court in this case was to hold it for the following term, however no decision was handed down on the constitutional questions it presented because Congress changed the law. In his report of the hearing and continuance, Dallas appended a long footnote in which he quoted from the remonstrances. At the time of this case, each Justice of the Supreme Court served also on a Circuit Court. Thus, while the Supreme Court of the United States never ruled on the constitutionality of the Invalid Pensions Act of 1792, five of its six members, Jay, Cushing, Wilson, Blair and Iredell, declared it unconstitutional as members of the United States Circuit Courts for the Districts of New York, Pennsylvania and North Carolina.

The decision, however, may have been due to the lack of the authority of the appellant, the Attorney General of the United States, Edmund Randolph, to bring the appeal to the Supreme Court. Attorney General Randolph initiated the case at the Supreme Court neither on behalf of the United States or Mr. Hayburn. The Court declined to rule on a lower court decision, possibly because only the Attorney General wanted it to do so.

== See also ==
- Re Judiciary and Navigation Acts (1921), similar ruling of the High Court of Australia
