= Bailey v. Alabama =

- Supreme Court of the United States

Submitted October 20, 1910 Decided January 3, 1911
- Full case name: Alonzo Bailey, Plaintiff in Error, v. State of Alabama
- Citations: 219 U.S. 219 (more) 29 S. Ct. 141; 53 L. Ed. 278

Case history
- Prior: Error to the Supreme Court of Alabama

Court membership
- Chief Justice Edward D. White Associate Justices John M. Harlan · Joseph McKenna; Oliver W. Holmes Jr. · William R. Day; Horace H. Lurton · Charles E. Hughes; Willis Van Devanter · Joseph R. Lamar

Case opinions
- Majority: Hughes, joined by White, Harlan, McKenna, Day, Van Devanter, Lamar
- Dissent: Holmes, joined by Lurton

Bailey v. Alabama, 219 U.S. 219 (1911), was a United States Supreme Court case that overturned the peonage laws of Alabama. Bailey challenged an Alabama law that effectively criminalized leaving a job after receiving an advance payment, arguing that it enforced involuntary labor, but he initially lost a case in the Fuller Court, despite support from the Roosevelt administration. When the case reached the Court again Bailey won in a 5-2 decision. Oliver Wendell Holmes dissented.

== Background ==
The Supreme Court considered the validity of the Alabama state court's ruling that Alabama statute (§ 4730 of the Code of Alabama of 1896, as amended in 1903 and 1907) was constitutional under the 14th Amendment, 13th Amendment, and federal law enforcing the 13th Amendment. The Court found that holding a person criminally liable for taking money for work not performed was akin to indentured servitude, outlawed by the Thirteenth Amendment, as it required that person to work rather than be found guilty of a crime.

At the turn of the twentieth century, muckraking journalists, reform-minded Southern judges, and the administration of Theodore Roosevelt campaigned against the peonage system. The campaign gained momentum after reports showed that hundreds of white immigrants, as well as others, were becoming trapped in peonage. The federal government brought more than 100 prosecutions between 1901 and 1905, but these efforts encountered significant resistance from the Fuller Court.

The Supreme Court upheld the constitutionality of the 1867 Anti-Peonage Act in Clyatt v. United States (1905). However, despite strong criticism of peonage from Assistant Attorney General Charles W. Russell between 1906 and 1908, the Fuller Court repeatedly found reasons to undermine anti-peonage enforcement. It overturned the conviction of a peonage offender in Clyatt, allowed Bailey to remain imprisoned for years under an unconstitutional peonage law in Bailey v. Alabama, and freed white Southern groups convicted of using violence and intimidation to drive Black workers away from better-paying jobs. Under the White Court, the Supreme Court became more receptive to efforts against peonage. In Bailey v. Alabama, the administration of William Howard Taft submitted an amicus brief supporting Bailey.

=== State law ===
An Alabama state law made it a crime to enter a written employment or tenancy contract, obtain money or property in advance, and then refuse to perform the agreed services or cultivate the land with intent to defraud. The law read:

Any person who, with intent to injure or defraud his employer, enters into a contract in writing for the performance of any act of service, and thereby obtains money or other property from such employer, and with like intent, and without just cause, and without refunding such money, or paying for such property, refuses or fails to perform such act or service, must on conviction be punished....

Amendments enacted in 1903 and 1907 provided that a person's refusal or failure to perform the contracted labor or to refund the advance without just cause would constitute prima facie evidence of fraudulent intent. In addition to the statute's presumption of fraudulent intent, Alabama courts applied an evidentiary rule preventing the accused from testifying about his own uncommunicated motives, purpose, or intent in order to rebut that presumption. The Court treated this rule as having the same practical effect as if it were part of the statute itself.

=== Alonzo Bailey ===
Alonzo Bailey was an African American from Alabama who agreed to work for The Riverside Company for one year at $12 per month. He received an advance of $15. After working for a little over a month he stopped work but did not refund any money. According to the state law, quitting after receiving an advance was taken as prima facie evidence of intent to defraud.

Bailey was arrested and jailed. While awaiting trial he filed a petition for habeas corpus asking the court to determine whether his imprisonment was lawful. He argued that the Alabama law under which he was being prosecuted was unconstitutional because it violated the 13th Amendment and the federal Anti-Peonage law.

The company's manager testified that Bailey refused both to continue working under the contract and to repay the advance. The manager also testified, at the behest of the Bailey's lawyer, and over the state's objection, that Bailey was Black. No other evidence was presented at trial.

=== 1908 lawsuit ===
Bailey lost his first lawsuit at the Supreme Court in a 7-2 decision by Oliver Wendell Holmes, with dissent by John Marshall Harlan. After losing the case he was convicted of fraud and was held responsible for the advance he had not worked off and court costs totaling $76.40. Because he could not afford to pay the fine he was sentenced to 136 days hard labor.

== Supreme Court ==
=== Majority ===
When Bailey's case returned to the Supreme Court in 1910–11, the Court reversed its earlier position and ruled 5–2 in his favor, despite Justice Holmes—who had written the earlier opinion against him—now dissenting. The Court held that the Alabama law under which he was prosecuted was unconstitutional because it violated the Thirteenth Amendment and federal anti-peonage law by effectively compelling labor to repay a debt.

Although evidence of Bailey's race was presented at the trial by his defense attorney, the Court did not find any evidence in the record that the Alabama statute was being enforced on a racial basis.

The Court then analyzed the statute at issue using the Alabama Supreme Court's decision in Ex Parte Riley, 94 Ala. 82 (1892) and stated, "To justify conviction, it was necessary that this intent should be established by competent evidence, aided only by such inferences as might logically be derived from the facts proved, and should not be the subject of mere surmise or arbitrary assumption." However, after the 1903 amendment to the Alabama law at issue here, the prosecution no longer had to prove intent to injure or defraud. The Court took issue with that change stating:

Whatever the reason for leaving the service, if, judged by the terms of the contract, it is insufficient in law, it is not 'just cause.' The money received and repayable, nothing more being shown, constitutes a mere debt. The asserted difficulty of proving the intent to injure or defraud is thus made the occasion for dispensing with such proof, so far as the prima facie case is concerned.

The Court continued by stating that without the inference created by statute in this case, Bailey would not have been convicted. The Court then turned to the constitutionality of compulsory service as required by the law.

[A]lthought the statute in terms is to punish fraud, still its natural and inevitable effect is to expose to conviction for crime those who simply fail or refuse to perform contracts for personal service in liquidation of a debt; and judging its purpose by its effect, that it seeks in this way to provide the means of compulsion through which performance of such service may be secured.

The Court continued by discussing the meaning of the Thirteenth Amendment and the broad reading of involuntary servitude. Further, in discussing peonage, stated, "The essence of the thing is compulsory service in payment of a debt. A peon is one who is compelled to work for his creditor until his debt is paid." The Court again discussed the broad interpretation of the Thirteenth Amendment, "in this explicit and comprehensive enactment, Congress was not concerned with mere names or manner of description.... It was concerned with a fact, wherever it might exist; with a condition, however named and wherever it might be established, maintained, or enforced."

Analyzing the law by its effects rather than its pretense, the Court held that a contract may expose a debtor to the responsibility for his debt but not enforced labor.

Finally, the Court states, "what the state may not do directly, it may not do indirectly." Thus, the creation of a statutory presumption to facilitate convictions for failure to pay a debt that could not be otherwise prosecuted was found to be invalid. Further, the peonage laws of Alabama were found to be contrary to the Thirteenth Amendment to the United States Constitution and therefore unconstitutional.

Justice Oliver Holmes dissented in this case. His analysis stated that adding a criminal sanction to a law with civil liability already in place goes to strengthen the law itself. Also, if a fine may be imposed, there must be punishment for nonpayment, which, in this case, is prison. His logic continued by stating that indentured servitude, as a punishment for a crime, is expressly outside the reach of the Thirteenth Amendment:

To sum up, I think that obtaining money by fraud may be made a crime as well as murder or theft; that a false representation, expressed or implied, at the time of making a contract of labor, that one intends to perform it, and thereby obtaining an advance, may be declared a case of fraudulently obtaining money as well as any other; that if made a crime it may be punished like any other crime; and that an unjustified departure from the promised service without repayment may be declared a sufficient case to go to the jury for their judgment; all without in any way infringing the Thirteenth Amendment or the statutes of the United States.

== See also ==
- Black Codes (United States)
- Indentured servitude
