= List of United States Supreme Court cases, volume 219 =

Supreme Court of the United States
- Interactive map of Supreme Court of the United States
- 38°53′26″N 77°00′16″W
- Established: March 4, 1789; 236 years ago
- Location: Washington, D.C.
- Coordinates: 38°53′26″N 77°00′16″W
- Composition method: Presidential nomination with Senate confirmation
- Authorised by: Constitution of the United States, Art. III, § 1
- Judge term length: life tenure, subject to impeachment and removal
- Number of positions: 9 (by statute)
- Website: supremecourt.gov

This is a list of cases reported in volume 219 of United States Reports, decided by the Supreme Court of the United States in 1910 and 1911.

== Justices of the Supreme Court at the time of volume 219 U.S. ==
The Supreme Court is established by Article III, Section 1 of the Constitution of the United States, which says: "The judicial Power of the United States, shall be vested in one supreme Court . . .". The size of the Court is not specified; the Constitution leaves it to Congress to set the number of justices. Under the Judiciary Act of 1789 Congress originally fixed the number of justices at six (one chief justice and five associate justices). Since 1789 Congress has varied the size of the Court from six to seven, nine, ten, and back to nine justices (always including one chief justice).

When the cases in volume 219 were decided the Court comprised the following nine members:

Portrait	Justice	Office	Home State	Succeeded	Date confirmed by the Senate (Vote)	Tenure on Supreme Court
	Edward Douglass White	Chief Justice	Louisiana	Melville Fuller	December 12, 1910 (Acclamation)	December 19, 1910 – May 19, 1921 (Died)
	John Marshall Harlan	Associate Justice	Kentucky	David Davis	November 29, 1877 (Acclamation)	December 10, 1877 – October 14, 1911 (Died)
	Joseph McKenna	Associate Justice	California	Stephen Johnson Field	January 21, 1898 (Acclamation)	January 26, 1898 – January 5, 1925 (Retired)
	Oliver Wendell Holmes Jr.	Associate Justice	Massachusetts	Horace Gray	December 4, 1902 (Acclamation)	December 8, 1902 – January 12, 1932 (Retired)
	William R. Day	Associate Justice	Ohio	George Shiras Jr.	February 23, 1903 (Acclamation)	March 2, 1903 – November 13, 1922 (Retired)
	Horace Harmon Lurton	Associate Justice	Tennessee	Rufus W. Peckham	December 20, 1909 (Acclamation)	January 3, 1910 – July 12, 1914 (Died)
	Charles Evans Hughes	Associate Justice	New York	David Josiah Brewer	May 2, 1910 (Acclamation)	October 10, 1910 – June 10, 1916 (Resigned)
	Willis Van Devanter	Associate Justice	Wyoming	Edward Douglass White (as Associate Justice)	December 15, 1910 (Acclamation)	January 3, 1911 (Note: While Willis Van Devanter and Joseph Rucker Lamar were sworn in as associate justice on the same date, their seniority (precedence) on the Supreme Court was determined by the dates borne on their judicial commissions—President Taft issued the judicial commission of Justice Van Devanter on Dec. 16, 1910, bearing that date; the commission of Justice Lamar issued the next day, Dec. 17.) – June 2, 1937 (Retired)
	Joseph Rucker Lamar	Associate Justice	Georgia	William Henry Moody	December 15, 1910 (Acclamation)	January 3, 1911 – January 2, 1916 (Died)

== Notable Case in 219 U.S. ==
=== Bailey v. Alabama ===
In Bailey v. Alabama, 219 U.S. 219 (1911), the Supreme Court struck down the peonage laws of Alabama. The Court held that holding a person criminally liable for accepting money for work not ultimately performed was akin to indentured servitude, outlawed by the Thirteenth Amendment, as it required that person to work rather than be found guilty of a crime.

== Citation style ==
Under the Judiciary Act of 1789 the federal court structure at the time comprised District Courts, which had general trial jurisdiction; Circuit Courts, which had mixed trial and appellate (from the US District Courts) jurisdiction; and the United States Supreme Court, which had appellate jurisdiction over the federal District and Circuit courts—and for certain issues over state courts. The Supreme Court also had limited original jurisdiction (i.e., in which cases could be filed directly with the Supreme Court without first having been heard by a lower federal or state court). There were one or more federal District Courts and/or Circuit Courts in each state, territory, or other geographical region.

The Judiciary Act of 1891 created the United States Courts of Appeals and reassigned the jurisdiction of most routine appeals from the district and circuit courts to these appellate courts. The Act created nine new courts that were originally known as the "United States Circuit Courts of Appeals." The new courts had jurisdiction over most appeals of lower court decisions. The Supreme Court could review either legal issues that a court of appeals certified or decisions of court of appeals by writ of certiorari.

Bluebook citation style is used for case names, citations, and jurisdictions.

- "# Cir." = United States Court of Appeals
  - e.g., "3d Cir." = United States Court of Appeals for the Third Circuit
- "C.C.D." = United States Circuit Court for the District of . . .
  - e.g.,"C.C.D.N.J." = United States Circuit Court for the District of New Jersey
- "D." = United States District Court for the District of . . .
  - e.g.,"D. Mass." = United States District Court for the District of Massachusetts
- "E." = Eastern; "M." = Middle; "N." = Northern; "S." = Southern; "W." = Western
  - e.g.,"C.C.S.D.N.Y." = United States Circuit Court for the Southern District of New York
  - e.g.,"M.D. Ala." = United States District Court for the Middle District of Alabama
- "Ct. Cl." = United States Court of Claims
- The abbreviation of a state's name alone indicates the highest appellate court in that state's judiciary at the time.
  - e.g.,"Pa." = Supreme Court of Pennsylvania
  - e.g.,"Me." = Supreme Judicial Court of Maine

== List of cases in volume 219 U.S. ==
Case Name	Page & year	Opinion of the Court	Concurring opinion(s)	Dissenting opinion(s)	Lower Court	Disposition
United States v. Press P. Co.	1 (1911)	White	none	none	C.C.S.D.N.Y.	affirmed
Atlantic et al. Co. v. Philippines	17 (1910)	Holmes	none	none	Phil.	affirmed
Title et al. Co. v. Crane Co.	24 (1910)	Holmes	none	none	9th Cir.	affirmed
Mobile et al. R.R. Co. v. Turnipseed	35 (1910)	Lurton	none	none	Miss.	affirmed
Herencia v. Guzman	44 (1910)	Hughes	none	none	D.P.R.	affirmed
American L. Co. v. Zeiss	47 (1911)	White	none	none	9th Cir.	certification
United States v. Barber	72 (1911)	White	none	none	D. Idaho	reversed
Hendrix v. United States	79 (1911)	McKenna	none	none	E.D. Tex.	affirmed
West et al. R.R. Co. v. Pittsburgh C. Co.	92 (1911)	McKenna	none	none	Pa.	affirmed
Noble S. Bank v. Haskell I	104 (1911)	Holmes	none	none	Okla.	affirmed
Schallenberger v. First S. Bank	114 (1911)	Holmes	none	none	C.C.D. Neb.	reversed
Assaria S. Bank v. Dolley	121 (1911)	Holmes	none	none	C.C.D. Kan.	affirmed
Engel v. O'Malley	128 (1911)	Holmes	none	none	C.C.S.D.N.Y.	affirmed
Kentucky U. Co. v. Kentucky	140 (1911)	Day	none	none	Ky.	affirmed
Spokane et al. R.R. Co. v. Washington et al. R.R. Co.	166 (1911)	Day	none	none	Wash.	affirmed
Fore R.S. Co. v. Hagg	175 (1911)	Day	none	none	C.C.D. Mass.	dismissed
United States v. Grizzard	180 (1911)	Lurton	none	none	C.C.E.D. Ky.	affirmed
Atlantic C.L.R.R. Co. v. Riverside M.	186 (1911)	Lurton	none	none	C.C.S.D. Ga.	affirmed
Louisville & N.R.R. Co. v. Scott	209 (1911)	Lurton	none	none	Ky.	affirmed
In re Gregory	210 (1911)	Hughes	none	none	D.C. Cir.	habeas corpus denied
Bailey v. Alabama	219 (1911)	Hughes	none	Holmes	Ala.	reversed
United States v. Chamberlin	250 (1911)	Hughes	none	none	8th Cir.	reversed
House v. Mayes	270 (1911)	Harlan	none	none	Mo.	affirmed
Brodnax v. Missouri	285 (1911)	Harlan	none	none	Mo.	affirmed
Reaves v. Ainsworth	296 (1911)	McKenna	none	none	D.C. Cir.	affirmed
German A. Ins. Co. v. Hale	307 (1911)	Harlan	none	none	C.C.S.D. Ala.	affirmed
W.W. Bierce, Ltd. v. Waterhouse	320 (1911)	Lurton	none	none	Sup. Ct. Terr. Haw.	reversed
Sexton v. Dreyfus	339 (1911)	Holmes	none	none	2d Cir.	reversed
Muskrat v. United States	346 (1911)	Day	none	none	Ct. Cl.	reversed
Ex parte Harding	363 (1911)	White	none	none	C.C.N.D. Ill.	mandamus denied
Weyerhaeuser v. Hoyt	380 (1911)	White	none	Harlan	8th Cir.	reversed
Campbell v. Weyerhaeuser	424 (1911)	White	none	none	8th Cir.	affirmed
Northern P.R.R. Co. v. Wass	426 (1911)	White	none	Harlan	Minn.	reversed
Southern P. Co. v. ICC	433 (1911)	White	none	none	C.C.N.D. Cal.	reversed
Chicago et al. R.R. Co. v. Arkansas	453 (1911)	Harlan	none	none	Ark.	affirmed
Louisville & N.R.R. Co. v. Mottley	467 (1911)	Harlan	none	none	Ky.	reversed
Chicago et al. R.R. Co. v. United States	486 (1911)	Harlan	none	none	C.C.N.D. Ill.	affirmed
Southern P.T. Co. v. ICC	498 (1911)	McKenna	none	none	C.C.S.D. Tex.	affirmed
Merrimack R.S. Bank v. City of Clay Center	527 (1911)	Lurton	none	none	C.C.D. Kan.	contempt discharged
Roughton v. Knight	537 (1911)	Lurton	none	none	Cal.	affirmed
Chicago et al. R.R. Co. v. McGuire	549 (1911)	Hughes	none	none	Iowa	affirmed
Noble S. Bank v. Haskell II	575 (1911)	Holmes	none	none	Okla.	rehearing denied
Buck's et al. Co. v. AFL	581 (1911)	per curiam	none	none	D.C. Cir.	dismissed

== See also ==
- Certificate of division
