= Stratton's Independence, Ltd. v. Howbert =

- Supreme Court of the United States

Argued October 21, 1913 Decided December 1, 1913
- Full case name: Stratton's Independence, Limited v. Howbert, Collector of Internal Revenue
- Citations: 231 U.S. 399 (more) 34 S. Ct. 136; 58 L. Ed. 285; 1913 U.S. LEXIS 2577

Case history
- Subsequent: 211 F. 1023 (8th Cir. 1914)

Court membership
- Chief Justice Edward D. White Associate Justices Joseph McKenna · Oliver W. Holmes Jr. William R. Day · Horace H. Lurton; Charles E. Hughes · Willis Van Devanter; Joseph R. Lamar · Mahlon Pitney

Case opinions
- Majority: Pitney, joined by Day, Lurton, Hughes, Van Devanter, Lamar
- Concur/dissent: White, joined by McKenna, Holmes

Stratton's Independence, Ltd. v. Howbert, 231 U.S. 399 (1913), was a case before the U.S. Supreme Court that addressed the question of corporate taxation.

== Case ==
The case was argued on October 21, 1913, and decided on December 1, 1913.

Stratton's Independence, Limited, a British corporation that owned and operated mines in Colorado, sued in a district court to recover taxes it had paid under protest in accordance with the provisions of the Corporation Tax Act of 1909. During the year 1909, the firm had gross sales of $284,682.85 and costs of $190,939.42, resulting in a profit of $93,743.43. In 1910, the figures had been similar.

=== Plaintiff's argument ===
Stratton's contended that the mining and sale of ore was an essentially different sort of activity than manufacturing, because it involved the depletion and sale of capital, and should therefore not be taxed in the same way, because taxing the sale of ore amounted to taxing capital.

=== Majority opinion ===
Justice Pitney, in the majority opinion, stated that the case raised three questions. The first was whether or not the Corporate Tax Act applied to mining corporations. The second question raised was whether or not proceeds from mining activities constituted "income" by the definition of the act. The final question related to whether or not ore sales were considered income and therefore if the mining corporation could deduct the value of the ore in place before it was mined as depreciation. The court answered the first two questions in the affirmative, but not the third. Mining, Justice Pitney argued, is generally comparable to manufacturing, and is certainly a business; hence, the gains from this activity should be considered income for the purposes of taxation.

Chief Justice White, Justice McKenna, and Justice Holmes dissented on the third question.

== Significance ==
The case represented one of the Supreme Court's early attempts to define the term “income.”

Justice Pitney's description of income as “the gain derived from capital, from labor, or from both combined” has been widely quoted, as has his comment that “the corporation tax act of 1909 was not intended to be and is not, in any proper sense, an income tax law.”

The case has been cited (unsuccessfully) in such cases as Hill v. United States and Cameron v. Internal Revenue Service, in support of the argument that a tax on an individual's income is unconstitutional, even though the decision in Stratton did not rule either corporate or individual income tax unconstitutional.
