= Advisory opinion =

Type of legal opinion

An advisory opinion of a court or other government authority, such as an election commission, is a decision or opinion of the body but which is non-binding in law and does not have the effect of adjudicating a specific legal case, but which merely legally advises on its opinion as to the constitutionality or interpretation of a law. The International Law Association is one such commission that provides non binding opinions and advisory documents regarding aspects of international law. Some countries have procedures by which the executive or legislative branches may refer questions to the judiciary for an advisory opinion. In other countries or specific jurisdictions, courts may be prohibited from issuing advisory opinions.

== International courts ==
=== International Court of Justice ===
The International Court of Justice is empowered to give advisory opinions under Chapter IV of its Statute (an annex to the United Nations Charter) when requested to do so by certain organs or agencies of the United Nations. These opinions are non-binding.

=== Inter-American Court of Human Rights ===
The advisory function of the Inter-American Court of Human Rights enables it to respond to consultations submitted by agencies and member states of the Organization of American States regarding the interpretation of the American Convention on Human Rights or other instruments governing human rights in the Americas. It is also empowered to give advice on domestic laws and proposed legislation, and whether or not they are compatible with the Convention's provisions.

- List of Advisory Opinions of the Inter-American Court of Human Rights.

== National courts ==
=== Australia ===
The High Court of Australia is prohibited by the Constitution of Australia from issuing advisory opinions; a binding determination requires a controversy between two or more parties. There have been occasions in Australia's legal history, such as the 1975 Australian constitutional crisis, when politicians have solicited informal advice from Justices of the High Court in their personal capacity.

=== Canada ===
Under Canadian law, the reference question mechanism is equivalent to an advisory opinion.

The Supreme Court Act gives the federal Cabinet the power to refer questions to the Supreme Court of Canada on any questions of law. The Supreme Court then has jurisdiction to hold a hearing on the reference, just like an appeal. The Attorney General of Canada participates in a federal reference. The provincial and territorial Attorneys General have the right to intervene, and interested parties may apply to intervene. The parties make detailed written submissions to the Court, which then holds a hearing. It typically reserves its decision, later releasing a written opinion. The Court has a discretion to refuse to answer questions which are too ambiguous or will not provide an answer with any meaning.

The Provincial governments and some of the territories have a similar power to refer questions to their highest appeal courts for an opinion. This power is set out in their respective provincial laws defining the powers of the appellate courts. The Supreme Court Act gives an automatic right of appeal from a reference decision of a provincial Court of Appeal to the Supreme Court of Canada.

=== India ===
In India, the President of India can request the Supreme Court of India to provide its advice on certain matters. This procedure is called "Presidential Reference". According to Article 143 of the Constitution of India, the President of India may refer to the Supreme Court of India, a question of law or fact which, he thinks, is of public importance. It is not binding on the Supreme Court to answer questions raised in the reference. For an analysis of this provision, see noted Indian lawyer Deepaloke Chatterjee's widely cited article on this point

1. If at any time it appears to the President that a question of law or fact has arisen, or is likely to arise, which is of such a nature and of such public importance that it is expedient to obtain the opinion of the Supreme Court upon it, he may refer the question to that Court for consideration and the Court may, after such hearing as it thinks fit, report to the President its opinion thereon.

2. The President may, notwithstanding anything in the proviso to article 131, refer a dispute of the kind mentioned in the said proviso to the Supreme Court for opinion and the Supreme Court shall, after hearing as it thinks fit, report to the President its opinion thereon.

— Article 143, Constitution of India

=== Nauru ===
Article 55 of the Constitution of Nauru provides: "The President or a Minister may, in accordance with the approval of the Cabinet, refer to the Supreme Court for its opinion any question concerning the interpretation or effect of any provision of this Constitution which has arisen or appears to the Cabinet likely to arise, and the Supreme Court shall pronounce in open court its opinion on the question."

This article has been put to use on six occasions, in the following cases, in which the Cabinet sought an advisory opinion from the Supreme Court on hypothetical cases relating to an interpretation of constitutional provisions: Three Questions Referred under Articles 36 & 55 of the Constitution (1977); Four Questions Referred under Article 55 of the Constitution (1977); Constitutional Reference; In re Article 55 of the Constitution (2003); Constitutional Reference; In re Dual Nationality and Other Questions (2004); In the Matter of Article 55 & 45 (and Article 36 & 40) of the Constitution (2007); and In the Matter of Article 55 & 45 (and Article 36 & 40) of the Constitution (2008).

In Constitutional Reference; In re Dual Nationality and Other Questions (2004), Chief Justice Barry Connell made the following remarks in relation to the nature of article 55:

The referral provision in the Constitution is an unusual process, not always available under other written constitutions but, nevertheless, Article 55 has been used on a number of occasions in Nauru. It is unusual in that Courts will not normally exercise jurisdiction in a case without a justiciable matter. Courts normally will not conduct a case on a hypothetical question. However, under Article 55, the Court is enjoined to give an Opinion where Cabinet, and only Cabinet, desires an interpretation or effect of a provision of the Constitution where the question has arisen or appears to the Cabinet likely to arise [...].
On account of the nature of Article 55, the Court must limit itself to the questions asked. Whilst the Court gives what is termed an Opinion, one must realise that it is a constitutional opinion based on law. Such an Opinion carries legal weight, so far as it goes, but it must itself be susceptible to the normal canons of interpretation in the event of a particular disputed question brought before the Court.

=== United States ===
==== Federal courts ====
The United States Supreme Court has determined that the case or controversy requirement found in Article Three of the United States Constitution prohibits United States federal courts from issuing advisory opinions. Accordingly, before the court will hear a case, it must find that the parties have a tangible interest at stake in the matter, the issue presented must be "mature for judicial resolution" or ripe, and a justiciable issue must remain before the court throughout the course of the lawsuit. While this doctrine is still in full force, there has been a liberalization of these requirements in recent years.

In a letter to President George Washington, replying to the president's request for such an opinion, then-Chief Justice John Jay replied that it would violate the separation of powers for the Supreme Court to provide such an opinion, noting that the president could rely on advice from anyone within the executive branch under Article Two of the United States Constitution which expressly permits the President of the United States to "require the Opinion, in writing, of the principal Officer in each of the executive Departments, upon any subject relating to the Duties of their respective Offices." In other words, Jay informed President Washington that the President ought to turn to the Attorney General and perhaps other Cabinet secretaries when they require legal advice concerning American law. Over a century later the Court dismissed a case because there was no "actual controversy" between the parties; thus, any opinion rendered would be advisory.

==== State courts ====
State courts are not subject to U.S. Constitution's Article III case or controversy limitation. Many state courts are barred from issuing advisory opinions by their own constitutions, although there are often specific exceptions to these limitations. Some states, like Rhode Island, permit the governor to certify questions on the constitutionality of laws to the state supreme court. Also, some states require their supreme court to give advisory opinions on particular matters, such as whether proposed amendments to the state constitution violate the U.S. Constitution.

Statutory or constitutional provisions in Alabama, Colorado, Delaware, Florida, Maine, Massachusetts, Michigan, New Hampshire, Oklahoma, Rhode Island, and South Dakota allow their highest courts to issue advisory opinions in some circumstances. Several other states, including Kentucky, Minnesota, Missouri, and Vermont, once allowed for advisory opinions by statute or constitution, but have since abandoned the practice.

Advisory opinions should not be confused with certified questions by one court to another, which are permissible. U.S. federal courts, when confronted with real cases or controversies in which the federal court's decision will turn in whole or in part on a question of state law (e.g. diversity cases under the Erie doctrine or issues in which federal law incorporates state law by reference, such as exemptions in bankruptcy), occasionally ask the highest court of the relevant state to give an authoritative answer to the state-law question, which the federal court will then apply to its resolution of the federal case (see e.g. Pullman abstention). Because the state court in such circumstances is giving an opinion that affects an actual case, it is not considered to be issuing an advisory opinion.

== See also ==
- Declaratory judgment - a binding opinion assigning rights, duties, and obligations within a specific case or controversy.
