= List of United States Supreme Court cases, volume 231 =

Supreme Court of the United States
- Interactive map of Supreme Court of the United States
- 38°53′26″N 77°00′16″W
- Established: March 4, 1789; 236 years ago
- Location: Washington, D.C.
- Coordinates: 38°53′26″N 77°00′16″W
- Composition method: Presidential nomination with Senate confirmation
- Authorised by: Constitution of the United States, Art. III, § 1
- Judge term length: life tenure, subject to impeachment and removal
- Number of positions: 9 (by statute)
- Website: supremecourt.gov

This is a list of cases reported in volume 231 of United States Reports, decided by the Supreme Court of the United States in 1913 and 1914.

== Justices of the Supreme Court at the time of volume 231 U.S. ==
The Supreme Court is established by Article III, Section 1 of the Constitution of the United States, which says: "The judicial Power of the United States, shall be vested in one supreme Court . . .". The size of the Court is not specified; the Constitution leaves it to Congress to set the number of justices. Under the Judiciary Act of 1789 Congress originally fixed the number of justices at six (one chief justice and five associate justices). Since 1789, Congress has varied the size of the Court from six to seven, nine, ten, and back to nine justices; this number always including one chief justice.

When the cases in volume 231 were decided, the Court comprised the following nine members:

Portrait	Justice	Office	Home State	Succeeded	Date confirmed by the Senate (Vote)	Tenure on Supreme Court
	Edward Douglass White	Chief Justice	Louisiana	Melville Fuller	December 12, 1910 (Acclamation)	December 19, 1910 – May 19, 1921 (Died)
	Joseph McKenna	Associate Justice	California	Stephen Johnson Field	January 21, 1898 (Acclamation)	January 26, 1898 – January 5, 1925 (Retired)
	Oliver Wendell Holmes Jr.	Associate Justice	Massachusetts	Horace Gray	December 4, 1902 (Acclamation)	December 8, 1902 – January 12, 1932 (Retired)
	William R. Day	Associate Justice	Ohio	George Shiras Jr.	February 23, 1903 (Acclamation)	March 2, 1903 – November 13, 1922 (Retired)
	Horace Harmon Lurton	Associate Justice	Tennessee	Rufus W. Peckham	December 20, 1909 (Acclamation)	January 3, 1910 – July 12, 1914 (Died)
	Charles Evans Hughes	Associate Justice	New York	David Josiah Brewer	May 2, 1910 (Acclamation)	October 10, 1910 – June 10, 1916 (Resigned)
	Willis Van Devanter	Associate Justice	Wyoming	Edward Douglass White (as Associate Justice)	December 15, 1910 (Acclamation)	January 3, 1911 – June 2, 1937 (Retired)
	Joseph Rucker Lamar	Associate Justice	Georgia	William Henry Moody	December 15, 1910 (Acclamation)	January 3, 1911 – January 2, 1916 (Died)
	Mahlon Pitney	Associate Justice	New Jersey	John Marshall Harlan	March 13, 1912 (50–26)	March 18, 1912 – December 31, 1922 (Resigned)

== Citation style ==
Under the Judiciary Act of 1789, the federal court structure at the time comprised District Courts, which had general trial jurisdiction; Circuit Courts, which had mixed trial and appellate (from the US District Courts) jurisdiction; and the United States Supreme Court, which had appellate jurisdiction over the federal District and Circuit courts—and for certain issues over state courts. The Supreme Court also had limited original jurisdiction (i.e., in which cases could be filed directly with the Supreme Court without first having been heard by a lower federal or state court). There were one or more federal District Courts and/or Circuit Courts in each state, territory, or other geographical region.

The Judiciary Act of 1891 created the United States Courts of Appeals and reassigned the jurisdiction of most routine appeals from the district and circuit courts to these appellate courts. The Act created nine new courts that were originally known as the "United States Circuit Courts of Appeals." The new courts had jurisdiction over most appeals of lower court decisions. The Supreme Court could review either legal issues that a court of appeals certified or decisions of court of appeals by writ of certiorari.

On January 1, 1912, the effective date of the Judicial Code of 1911, the old Circuit Courts were abolished, with their remaining trial court jurisdiction transferred to the U.S. District Courts.

Bluebook citation style is used for case names, citations, and jurisdictions.

- "# Cir." = United States Court of Appeals
  - e.g., "3d Cir." = United States Court of Appeals for the Third Circuit
- "C.C.D." = United States Circuit Court for the District of . . .
  - e.g.,"C.C.D.N.J." = United States Circuit Court for the District of New Jersey
- "D." = United States District Court for the District of . . .
  - e.g.,"D. Mass." = United States District Court for the District of Massachusetts
- "E." = Eastern; "M." = Middle; "N." = Northern; "S." = Southern; "W." = Western
  - e.g.,"C.C.S.D.N.Y." = United States Circuit Court for the Southern District of New York
  - e.g.,"M.D. Ala." = United States District Court for the Middle District of Alabama
- "Ct. Cl." = United States Court of Claims
- The abbreviation of a state's name alone indicates the highest appellate court in that state's judiciary at the time.
  - e.g.,"Pa." = Supreme Court of Pennsylvania
  - e.g.,"Me." = Supreme Judicial Court of Maine

== List of cases in volume 231 U.S. ==
Case Name	Page and year	Opinion of the Court	Concurring opinion(s)	Dissenting opinion(s)	Lower Court	Disposition of case
Wood v. Vandalia Railroad Company	1 (1913)	Hughes	none	none	C.C.D. Ind.	reversed
Luria v. United States	9 (1913)	VanDevanter	none	none	S.D.N.Y.	affirmed
United States v. Sandoval	28 (1913)	VanDevanter	none	none	D.N.M.	reversed
National City Bank of New York v. Hotchkiss	50 (1913)	Holmes	none	none	2d Cir.	affirmed
Mechanics' and Metals National Bank v. Ernst	60 (1913)	Holmes	none	none	2d Cir.	affirmed
Baltic Mining Company v. Massachusetts	68 (1913)	Day	none	none	Mass.	affirmed
Virginia v. West Virginia	89 (1913)	White	none	none	original	continued
Summers v. United States	92 (1913)	McKenna	none	none	9th Cir.	reversed
Alzua v. Johnson	106 (1913)	Holmes	none	none	Phil.	affirmed
Missouri, Kansas and Texas Railway Company v. United States	112 (1913)	Holmes	none	none	5th Cir.	affirmed
Clement National Bank v. Vermont	120 (1913)	Hughes	none	none	Vt.	affirmed
United States v. Whitridge	144 (1913)	Pitney	none	none	2d Cir.	affirmed
Munsey v. Webb	150 (1913)	Holmes	none	none	D.C. Cir.	affirmed
Buchser v. Buchser	157 (1913)	Holmes	none	none	9th Cir.	affirmed
Straus v. Foxworth	162 (1913)	VanDevanter	none	none	N.M.	affirmed
Torres v. Lothrop, Luce and Company	171 (1913)	White	none	none	P.R.	affirmed
Northern Pacific Railroad Company v. Houston	181 (1913)	White	none	none	Minn.	reversed
United States v. Davis	183 (1913)	White	none	none	W.D. Mo.	reversed
Union Pacific Railroad Company v. Laramie Stock Yards Company	190 (1913)	McKenna	none	none	D. Wy.	reversed
Union Pacific Railroad Company v. Snow	204 (1913)	McKenna	none	none	Colo.	reversed
Union Pacific Railroad Company v. Sides	213 (1913)	McKenna	none	none	Colo.	reversed
Kener v. La Grange Mills	215 (1913)	Holmes	none	none	Ga.	affirmed
United States ex rel. Goldberg v. Daniels	218 (1913)	Holmes	none	none	D.C. Cir.	affirmed
Straus and Straus v. American Publishers' Association	222 (1913)	Day	none	none	N.Y. Sup. Ct.	reversed
United States Fidelity and Guaranty Company v. United States ex rel. Bartlett	237 (1913)	Day	none	none	2d Cir.	affirmed
Yazoo and Mississippi Valley Railroad Company v. Brewer	245 (1913)	Day	none	none	La.	dismissed
Marshall v. Dye	250 (1913)	Day	none	none	Ind.	dismissed
City of Vicksburg v. Henson	259 (1913)	Day	none	none	5th Cir.	reversed
United States v. Baltimore and Ohio Railroad Company	274 (1913)	Lurton	none	none	Comm. Ct.	affirmed
Louisville and Nashville Railroad Company v. Garrett	298 (1913)	Hughes	none	none	C.C.E.D. Ky.	affirmed
Sturges and Burn Manufacturing Company v. Beauchamp	320 (1913)	Hughes	none	none	Ill.	affirmed
Eastern Extension, Australia & China Telegraph Company, Ltd. v. United States	326 (1913)	Hughes	none	none	Ct. Cl.	reversed
Little v. Williams	335 (1913)	VanDevanter	none	none	Ark.	affirmed
Monson v. Simonson	341 (1913)	VanDevanter	none	none	S.D.	reversed
Steet and Smith v. Atlas Manufacturing Company	348 (1913)	VanDevanter	none	none	8th Cir.	dismissed
Downman v. Texas	353 (1913)	Lamar	none	none	Tex. Civ. App.	affirmed
United States v. Twenty-Five Packages of Panama Hats	358 (1913)	Lamar	none	none	2d Cir.	reversed
Delaware, Lackawanna and Western Railroad Company v. United States	363 (1913)	Lamar	none	none	W.D.N.Y.	affirmed
Amoskeag Savings Bank v. Purdy	373 (1913)	Pitney	none	none	N.Y. Sup. Ct.	affirmed
United States Fidelity and Guaranty Company v. Kentucky	394 (1913)	Pitney	none	none	Ky.	affirmed
Stratton's Independence, Ltd. v. Howbert	399 (1913)	Pitney	none	none	8th Cir.	certification
Kansas City Southern Railway Company v. United States	423 (1913)	Pitney	none	none	Comm. Ct.	affirmed
Grand Trunk Railroad Company v. Michigan Railroad Commission	457 (1913)	McKenna	none	none	E.D. Mich.	affirmed
Graham v. United States	474 (1913)	Holmes	none	none	4th Cir.	affirmed
Chavez v. Bergere	482 (1913)	VanDevanter	none	none	N.M.	affirmed
United States v. Carter	492 (1913)	White	none	none	W.D.N.C.	dismissed
New York Life Insurance Company v. Deer Lodge County	495 (1913)	McKenna	none	none	Mont.	affirmed
Greey v. Dockendorff	513 (1913)	Holmes	none	none	3d Cir.	affirmed
Kinder v. Scharff	517 (1913)	Holmes	none	none	La.	affirmed
Ludvigh v. American Woolen Company	522 (1913)	Day	none	none	2d Cir.	affirmed
Peabody v. United States	530 (1913)	Hughes	none	none	Ct Cl.	affirmed
Springstead v. Crawfordsville State Bank	541 (1913)	White	none	none	C.C.S.D. Fla.	reversed
Aetna Life Insurance Company v. Moore	543 (1913)	McKenna	none	none	5th Cir.	reversed
Prudential Insurance Company v. Moore	560 (1913)	McKenna	none	none	5th Cir.	reversed
Seattle, Renton & Southern Railway Company v. Washington ex rel. Linhoff	568 (1913)	Holmes	none	none	Wash.	dismissed
Pullman Company v. Croom	571 (1913)	Day	none	none	C.C.N.D. Fla.	dismissed
Phoenix Railroad Company v. Landis	578 (1913)	Hughes	none	none	Ariz.	affirmed
John v. Paullin	583 (1913)	VanDevanter	none	none	Okla.	dismissed
Baker v. Warner	588 (1913)	Lamar	none	none	D.C. Cir.	reversed
Work v. United Globe Mines	595 (1914)	White	none	none	Ariz.	affirmed
Van Syckel v. Arsuaga	601 (1914)	White	none	none	D.P.R.	affirmed
Wisconsin ex rel. Bolens v. Frear	616 (1914)	White	none	none	Wis.	dismissed
Wyandotte County Gas Company v. Kansas ex rel. Marshall	622 (1914)	White	none	none	Kan.	affirmed
Pennington v. United States	631 (1914)	White	none	none	Ct. Cl.	affirmed
In re City of Louisville	639 (1914)	McKenna	none	none	W.D. Ky.	mandamus denied
In re Engelhard and Sons Company	646 (1914)	McKenna	none	none	W.D. Ky.	mandamus denied
Louisville v. Cumberland Telephone and Telegraph Company	652 (1914)	McKenna	none	none	W.D. Ky.	affirmed
United States v. Antikamnia Chemical Company	654 (1914)	McKenna	none	none	D.C. Cir.	reversed
Mulcrevy v. City of San Francisco	669 (1914)	McKenna	none	none	Cal.	affirmed
Pennell v. Philadelphia and Reading Railroad Company	675 (1914)	McKenna	none	none	3d Cir.	affirmed
Tinker v. Midland Valley Mercantile Company	681 (1914)	Holmes	none	none	Okla.	reversed
Trimble v. City of Seattle	683 (1914)	Holmes	none	none	Wash.	affirmed
Piza Hermanos v. Caldentey	690 (1914)	Holmes	none	none	P.R.	affirmed
Hobbs v. Head and Dowst Company	692 (1914)	Holmes	none	none	1st Cir.	affirmed
United States v. Moist	701 (1914)	Holmes	none	none	N.D. Ill.	dismissed
Rainey v. W.R. Grace and Company	703 (1914)	Day	none	none	9th Cir.	certification
Cameron v. United States	710 (1914)	Day	none	none	2d Cir.	reversed
Radford v. Myers	725 (1914)	Day	none	none	Mich.	affirmed
