= Lincoln Union v. Northwestern Co. =

Lincoln Federal Labor Union et al. v. Northwestern Iron & Metal Co. et al.
- Supreme Court of the United States

Argued November 8–9, 1948 Decided February 28, 1949
- Full case name: Lincoln Federal Labor Union 19129 v. Northwestern Iron & Metal Co.
- Citations: 335 U.S. 525 (more): 69. S. Ct. 251 93 L. Ed. 212

Holding
- State "right-to-work" laws that prohibit union security agreements (like closed shops) do not violate the Due Process Clause of the Fourteenth Amendment.

Court membership
- Chief Justice Fred M. Vinson Associate Justices Hugo Black · Stanley F. Reed; Felix Frankfurter · William O. Douglas; Frank Murphy · Robert H. Jackson; Wiley B. Rutledge · Harold H. Burton

Case opinions
- Majority: Black
- Concurrence: Frankfurter
- Concurrence: Rutledge, joined by Murphy

Lincoln Federal Labor Union 19129 v. Northwestern Iron & Metal Co., 335 U.S., 525 (1949), consolidated with Whitaker v. North Carolina, is a United States Supreme Court case in which the court held that state right-to-work laws that prohibit union security agreements (like closed shops) do not violate the Due Process Clause of the Fourteenth Amendment.

The case involved a North Carolina statute and a Nebraska Constitutional amendment, which effectively mandated that no person could be denied an opportunity to obtain or retain employment based on membership or non-membership in a labor union. The employers were also barred from entering into contracts which obligated them to hire only union workers. The argument challenging the two rested on their alleged violations of the First Amendment and the Fourteenth Amendment. The Supreme Court of the United States held that neither the Nebraska amendment nor the North Carolina statute violated the rights guaranteed to employers, unions, or union members under the Constitution of the United States.

== Background ==
The Nebraska constitutional amendment and the North Carolina statute that gave rise to the case resulted from the post-war campaign launched against union security agreements. During World War II, the War Labor Board negotiated a compromise in which union members under contract would be required to remain so, but new employees were given the opportunity to opt out. This was reluctantly accepted by employers, as it reduced their control over hiring conditions. The amendment and statute arose in response, aiming to ban agreements in restraint of trade.

=== North Carolina Statute ===
The statute in North Carolina arose from the tobacco and textile industries, which paid notoriously low wages. After the war, both the American Federation of Labor and the Congress of Industrial Organizations announced plans for organizing drives below the Mason-Dixon Line as a way to protest unfair labor practices. Consequently, businesses began campaigning for greater autonomy in hiring, which resulted in the 1947 legislation against closed-shop agreements. The new statute was tested by George Whitaker, a building contractor who had signed a closed-shop agreement with local AFL unions. Supported by Section 14(b) of the Taft-Hartley Act, which ruled that state law would prevail over federal law if it is more restrictive. A warrant was issued for Whitaker and various union officers on the grounds of entering into a contract in restraint of trade. The result was a $50 fine, and subsequent litigation resulted in the case going to the Supreme Court.

=== Nebraska Constitutional Amendment ===
The constitutional amendment, Article XV § 2, was primarily driven by an organization called the Nebraska Small Businessmen's Association. The amendment was proposed at the 1946 election, after attaining a spot on the ballot through general petition, coming into effect on December 11th of the same year. The case arose when Dan Giebelhaus, a worker for Northwestern Iron & Metal Co., was suspended from Lincoln Federal Labor Union No. 19129 for nonpayment of dues. When the union requested that Giebelhaus be discharged, Northwestern Co. refused, stating that the new constitutional amendment overruled the union-security clause. As a result, the union filed suit seeking an injunction against the enforcement of the amendment. The District Court of Lancaster County dismissed the suit, holding that the state had the power to regulate union-shop clauses within collective labor agreements.

== Supreme Court ==
=== Arguments ===
The first challenge brought by the union was the claim that the Nebraska Constitutional Amendment and the North Carolina Statute violated the First Amendment. Their objection was that the legislation under scrutiny was a detriment to the constitutionally protected rights of unions and their workers to speak, assemble, and petition the government for redress of grievances. The argument solidified that the right to self-organize was constitutionally protected, and then used this position to contend that the state laws would infringe upon the most important aspect of self-organizing. Without the ability to negotiate a closed-shop contract, a union stood much less of a chance to create a unified workforce. As a result, collective bargaining became less collective, and more fragmented, thus taking away their ability to petition the government as a significant force. On the grounds of free speech, unions argued that the stripped version of membership security that they would be allowed would prevent them from adequately voicing and characterizing their views. The argument was made not only on constitutional grounds, but on historical ones as well, with the point being made that control over who worked alongside unionized workers was extremely important. The appellants' side looked back on organizing history, pointing to the consistent defeats unions suffered due to employers undercutting unions with non-unionized labor. Because of these experiences, it was felt that one of the only ways to secure safe union standing was to install closed shop agreements.

After the First Amendment claim, the Unions argued about the time frame of the statute, amendment, and the contracts they were addressing in the case. Article I, Section 10 of the constitution, which specifically outlines that states may not pass laws that "impair the Obligation of Contracts." The way that the Unions interpreted this was saying that the amendment and statute infringed upon contracts that existed before the legislation in question went into effect, meaning that the laws were not preventing the carrying out of the contracts the unions had signed prior. In effect, union members were no longer entitled to the same protections or guarantees that they were awarded through the signing of their contracts.

The third argument involved the Equal Protection Clause of the Fourteenth Amendment and relied on convincing the Court that the new laws prevented union and non-union members from being treated equally. Regardless of any neutral language in the laws, the effect of prohibiting union-security agreements was weakening the position of labor, while strengthening the position of employers and non-union employees. Union lawyers claimed that the existence of union security agreements established its own form of legal equality, and removing the ability to have such union security agreements is producing inequality by allowing non-union members to claim union achievements. Alongside what was commonly referred to as a free-rider problem, they also brought up the fact that unions would now be required to represent the same number of workers, but to do so with more limitations on their primary funding structure.

The last argument put forward by the unions was regarding the Due Process Clause of the Fourteenth Amendment. Their concern with the due process clause was split into two. First was the claim that the laws deprived them of the liberty to refuse to hire any person because they were not a union member. Second, they were deprived of the right to create union-employer contracts which obligated only hiring union members. In reality, what the unions were arguing for looks very similar to the doctrine of liberty of contract. What particularly helped back up this argument was that liberty of contract was historically a strong anti-union doctrine which prevailed during the Lochner era (Lochner v. New York, 1905).

=== Majority opinion ===
The majority opinion, written by Justice Hugo Black, refuted each of the arguments. On the argument of barring unions and their members from expressing their First Amendment rights, Black outlined that the laws make no point at suppressing any individual or group's right to speech, assembly, or petition. Black continued by suggesting that it would be dangerous to rule that individuals could be denied employment on the basis that they refuse to join union assemblies. In refutation to the second, Black cited two cases in his argument, Home Bldg. & Loan Assn v. Blaisdell (1934), and Viex v. Sixth Ward Bldg. & Loan Assn. (1940). What these cases ruled is that states have paramount authority to rule over contracts in a way that prioritizes the vital interests of its people. As a result, in order to enable equal protections against discrimination, the state could apply new laws to existing contracts. The third argument, premised on violations of the Fourteenth Amendment's equal protection clause, was nullified using the equal protection clause. Black held that, due to the language of the state laws, there cannot be a violation of the equal protection clause because the laws require that neither union nor non-union members be discriminated against, which directly contradicts the appellants' argument. Black specifically cited Wallace Corporation v. Labor Board (1944) in order to illustrate that state laws, like those being challenged, are in place precisely to protect the employment opportunities of independent unions. Lastly, Black held that, since the due process clause in the post-Lochner years had not been used to prevent states from legislating protections for union workers, there was no reason to see why states should be barred from passing protections for non-union workers. He stated that the law is not imposed to infringe on the ability of unions to make contracts, but to prevent employers from discriminating against union and non-union members alike. Alongside this assertion, Black clarified that if States have the ability to make such discrimination illegal, they must be able to prevent the creation of contracts that would bring it about.

=== Concurrence: Frankfurter ===
Justice Frankfurter wrote his concurrence on a single point, joining the court on all others. His main point was that the court may not be the right arena for unions to address such economic concerns. He contended that the right of association is one which must be questioned within the province of the legislature, continuing to say that historically, economic policy has not been forbidden from legislative experimentation. In his concurrence, Frankfurter cited Great Britain and Sweden as examples where the absence of union security agreements did not limit union growth.

=== Concurrence: Rutledge and Murphy ===
Justice Rutledge's concurrence was in agreement without reservation. His only hesitancy was that he felt a key constitutional issue had yet to be answered throughout the case. This issue was the difference between regulating contracts and regulating strikes. He felt it was wrong that the case could be decided without considering strikes simply because neither of the union cases involved a strike. His worry was that workers being compelled to work under unwanted conditions had not been discussed, comparing it to the involuntary servitude clause of the Thirteenth Amendment. The overall purpose of the concurrence was to establish that the ruling should not be used to propose that states had the power to go beyond union-security agreements and compel workers to perform unwanted labor in an unwanted manner.

== Impacts ==
Since the court case was decided, the ruling stood as the controlling precedent. The most prominent case in which the ruling was called into question was Janus v. AFSCME (2018), a case in which the Supreme Court examined whether it was constitutional to have public sector employees pay union dues if they were not members of the union. The Court ruled 5-4 that requiring public employees to pay union dues after refusing to join a union was a violation of the First Amendment. This case, while not the same as Lincoln v. Northwestern Co., was filed to expand union rights, but resulted in a victory for right-to-work laws.
