= Olsen v. Nebraska =

- Supreme Court of the United States

Argued April 8–9, 1941 Decided April 28, 1941
- Full case name: Olsen v. Nebraska ex rel. Western Reference & Bond Assn., Inc.
- Docket no.: 671
- Citations: 313 U.S. 236 (more) 61 S. Ct. 862; 85 L. Ed. 1305

Case history
- Prior: State ex rel. Western Reference & Bond Ass'n v. Kinney, 138 Neb. 574, 293 N.W. 393.
- Procedural: On Writ of Certiorari to the Supreme Court of Nebraska

Holding
- A Nebraska statute restricting employment agencies from collecting more than ten percent of the salary of individuals for whom the agency obtained employment is constitutional.

Court membership
- Chief Justice Charles E. Hughes Associate Justices Harlan F. Stone · Owen Roberts; Hugo Black · Stanley F. Reed; Felix Frankfurter · William O. Douglas; Frank Murphy

Case opinion
- Majority: Douglas, joined by Hughes, Stone, Roberts, Black, Reed, Frankfurter, Murphy
- McReynolds took no part in the consideration or decision of the case.

Laws applied
- U.S. Const. amend. XIV
- This case overturned a previous ruling or rulings
- Ribnik v. McBride, 277 U.S. 350 (1928)

Olsen v. Nebraska, 313 U.S. 236 (1941), was a case in which the United States Supreme Court held that the Supreme Court of Nebraska misapplied the 14th amendment's Due Process Clause, when it was used to strike down a state statute limiting the amount of compensation that private employment agencies could withhold from employees.

== Background ==
A Nebraska statute restricted employment agencies from collecting more than ten percent of the salary of individuals for whom the agency obtained employment. A realtor applied for a license to operate an employment agency, but the Secretary of Labor of Nebraska refused to issue the license because the realtor refused to limit its deductions to ten percent of the salaries of individuals who obtained employment. The realtor filed a lawsuit in an attempt to obtain a writ of mandamus to order the secretary to grant the license. Relying on Ribnik v. McBride, the Supreme Court of Nebraska ruled that the statute was unconstitutional because it violated the Fourteenth Amendment's Due Process Clause.

== Opinion of the Court ==
In an opinion written by Justice William O. Douglas, the Court held that the Supreme Court of Nebraska should not have relied upon Ribnik v. McBride because "[t]he drift away from Ribnik v. McBride ... has been so great that it can no longer be deemed a controlling authority." Justice Douglas explained that "[w]e are not concerned, however, with the wisdom, need, or appropriateness of the legislation" and concluded that the Court should defer to the state's determinations about the propriety of the legislation. The Court reversed the decision of the Supreme Court of Nebraska remanded the case to the Supreme Court of Nebraska for further proceedings.

== See also ==
- List of United States Supreme Court cases
- Lists of United States Supreme Court cases by volume
- List of United States Supreme Court cases by the Hughes Court
