= Utility ratemaking =

Formal regulatory process of setting prices for public utilities

In the United States, utility ratemaking is the formal regulatory process by which public utilities set their prices (or "rates").

== Ratemaking goals ==
=== Reasonable energy pricing ===
State laws typically restrict utilities from large, sudden rate increases. Utilities should implement new rates over time so that consumers and business can adapt to the changing prices. This is known as the principle of gradualism.

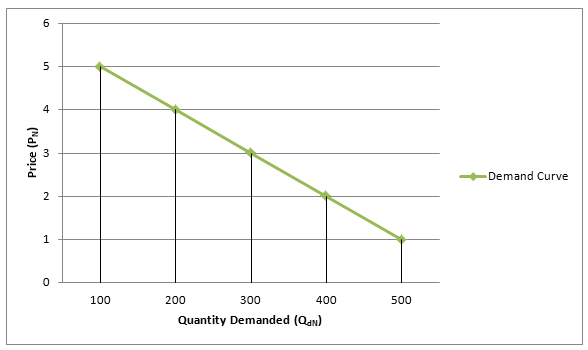
A standard demand curve showing that as prices decline, consumption rises.

=== Executive compensation ===
The compensation received by the executive in utility companies often receives the most scrutiny in the review of operating expenses. Similar to regulated utilities and their governing bodies that struggle to maintain a balance between keeping consumer costs reasonable and maintain enough profitability to attract investors, they must also compete with private companies for talented executives and then be able to retain those executives.

Constraints from regulation have been shown to affect the level of compensation received by executives in electric utilities. Executive compensation usually consists of four parts:

1. Base salary
2. Short term incentive pay (STIP)
3. Long-term incentive pay (LTIP); and
4. Benefits such as retirement and health care

Regulated companies are less likely to use incentive-based compensation in addition to base salaries. Executives in regulated electric utilities are less likely to be paid for their performance in bonuses or stock options.

==== Electric utility ratemaking for executives ====
Executives in regulated electric utilities also have less managerial control than those in unregulated or private industries. These executives are in charge of large numbers of workers as well as the company's physical and financial assets. Limiting their control has been shown to reduce investment opportunities. The same constraints are placed on the board of directors for the utility by the monitoring or oversight of the utility commission and they are less likely to approve compensation policies that include incentive-based pay. The compensation for electric utility executives will be the lowest in regulated utilities that have an unfavorable regulatory environment. These companies have more political constraints than those in a favorable regulatory environment and are less likely to have a positive response to requests for rate increases.

Just as increased constraints from regulation drive compensation down for executives in electric utilities, deregulation has been shown to increase compensation. The need to encourage risk-taking behavior in seeking new investment opportunities while keeping costs under control requires deregulated companies to offer performance-based incentives to their executives. It has been found that increased compensation is also more likely to attract executives experienced in working in competitive environments.

The Energy Act of 1992 in the United States removed previous barriers to wholesale competition in the electric utility industry. Currently twenty-four states allow for deregulated electric utilities: Ohio, Oklahoma, Oregon, Pennsylvania, Rhode Island, Texas, Virginia, Arizona, Arkansas, California, Connecticut, Delaware, Illinois, Maine, Maryland, Massachusetts, Michigan, Montana, New Hampshire, New Jersey, New Mexico, New York, and Washington D.C. As electric utility monopolies have been increasingly broken up into deregulated businesses, executive compensation has risen; particularly incentive compensation.

== Translation of revenue requirements into customer rates ==
Once a utility's revenue requirement is established in a quasi-judicial proceeding called a rate case, overseen in most countries by monopoly regulators, the focus turns to translating revenue requirements into customer rates. Though an oversimplification, most revenue requirements are translated into a rate per unit of commodity used by a customer. In electric utilities, the unit is typically a kilowatt hour, or "kWh"; for natural gas, the unit is typically ten British Thermal Units, called a dekatherm, or "dkt"; in water utilities, the unit is typically a gallon. The formula for translating revenue requirements into customer rates (for example, cents per kWh) is Rate per unit = R (revenue requirement) / expected commodity sales in units in the upcoming year.

The logic behind this is simple. If a utility's revenue requirement is $10 million, and it expects to sell 100 million units, the rate per unit is $0.10 cents/unit. If the utility actually sells 100 million units at $0.10 cents/unit, it will collect its $10 million revenue requirement. However, if a utility sells fewer units than expected, it will collect less than its $10 million revenue requirement, and if a utility sells more units than expected, it will collect more than its $10 million revenue requirement. This is why utilities prefer to sell more units than expected, called "throughput incentive".

=== Performance-based regulation ===
The above-described formula may be used to calculate a firm's allowed revenues (cost-of-service regulation). However, if the rates are set on the basis of a company's own costs, there is no incentive to reduce these costs. Furthermore, regulated utilities may have the incentive to overinvest.
