= Lists of United States Supreme Court cases by volume =

The following is a list of cases decided by the United States Supreme Court organized by volume of the United States Reports in which they appear. This is a list of volumes of U.S. Reports, and the links point to the contents of each individual volume. Each volume was edited by one of the Reporters of Decisions of the Supreme Court. As of the beginning of the October 2019 Term, there were 574 bound volumes of the U.S. Reports. There were another 14 volumes worth of opinions available as "slip opinions", which are preliminary versions of the opinion published on the Supreme Court's website.

== Edited by Dallas (1790–1800) ==
Volumes edited by Alexander J. Dallas, tenure 1790–1800.

- 1 ^{A}
- 2
- 3
- 4

== Edited by Cranch (1801–1815) ==
Volumes edited by William Cranch, tenure 1801–1815.

- 5
- 6
- 7
- 8
- 9
- 10
- 11
- 12
- 13

== Edited by Wheaton (1816–1827) ==
Volumes edited by Henry Wheaton, tenure 1816–1827.

- 14
- 15
- 16
- 17
- 18
- 19
- 20
- 21
- 22
- 23
- 24
- 25

== Edited by Peters (1828–1842) ==
Volumes edited by Richard Peters, tenure 1828–1842.

- 26
- 27
- 28
- 29
- 30
- 31
- 32
- 33
- 34
- 35
- 36
- 37
- 38
- 39
- 40
- 41

== Edited by Howard (1843–1860) ==
Volumes edited by Benjamin Chew Howard, tenure 1843–1860.

- 42
- 43
- 44
- 45
- 46
- 47
- 48
- 49
- 50
- 51
- 52
- 53
- 54
- 55
- 56
- 57
- 58
- 59
- 60
- 61
- 62
- 63
- 64
- 65

== Edited by Black (1861–1862) ==
Volumes edited by Jeremiah S. Black, tenure 1861–1862.

- 66
- 67

== Edited by Wallace (1863–1874) ==
Volumes edited by John William Wallace, tenure 1863–1874.

- 68
- 69
- 70
- 71
- 72
- 73
- 74
- 75
- 76
- 77
- 78
- 79
- 80
- 81
- 82
- 83
- 84
- 85
- 86
- 87
- 88
- 89
- 90

== Edited by Otto (1875–1883) ==
Volumes edited by William Tod Otto, tenure 1875–1883.

- 91
- 92
- 93
- 94
- 95
- 96
- 97
- 98
- 99
- 100
- 101
- 102
- 103
- 104
- 105
- 106
- 107

== Edited by Davis (1883–1902) ==
Volumes edited by J. C. Bancroft Davis, tenure 1883–1902.

- 108
- 109
- 110
- 111
- 112
- 113
- 114
- 115
- 116
- 117
- 118
- 119
- 120
- 121
- 122
- 123
- 124
- 125
- 126
- 127
- 128
- 129
- 130
- 131
- 132
- 133
- 134
- 135
- 136
- 137
- 138
- 139
- 140
- 141
- 142
- 143
- 144
- 145
- 146
- 147
- 148
- 149
- 150
- 151
- 152
- 153
- 154
- 155
- 156
- 157
- 158
- 159
- 160
- 161
- 162
- 163
- 164
- 165
- 166
- 167
- 168
- 169
- 170
- 171
- 172
- 173
- 174
- 175
- 176
- 177
- 178
- 179
- 180
- 181
- 182
- 183
- 184
- 185
- 186

== Edited by Butler (1902–1916) ==
Volumes edited by Charles Henry Butler, tenure 1902–1916.

- 187
- 188
- 189
- 190
- 191
- 192
- 193
- 194
- 195
- 196
- 197
- 198
- 199
- 200
- 201
- 202
- 203
- 204
- 205
- 206
- 207
- 208
- 209
- 210
- 211
- 212
- 213
- 214
- 215
- 216
- 217
- 218
- 219
- 220
- 221
- 222
- 223
- 224
- 225
- 226
- 227
- 228
- 229
- 230
- 231
- 232
- 233
- 234
- 235
- 236
- 237
- 238
- 239
- 240
- 241

== Edited by Knaebel (1916–1944) ==
Volumes edited by Ernest Knaebel, tenure 1916–1944.

- 242
- 243
- 244
- 245
- 246
- 247
- 248
- 249
- 250
- 251
- 252
- 253
- 254
- 255
- 256
- 257
- 258
- 259
- 260
- 261
- 262
- 263
- 264
- 265
- 266
- 267
- 268
- 269
- 270
- 271
- 272
- 273
- 274
- 275
- 276
- 277
- 278
- 279
- 280
- 281
- 282
- 283
- 284
- 285
- 286
- 287
- 288
- 289
- 290
- 291
- 292
- 293
- 294
- 295
- 296
- 297
- 298
- 299
- 300
- 301
- 302
- 303
- 304
- 305
- 306
- 307
- 308
- 309
- 310
- 311
- 312
- 313
- 314
- 315
- 316
- 317
- 318
- 319
- 320
- 321

== Edited by Wyatt (1944–1963) ==
Volumes edited by Walter Wyatt, tenure 1946–1963, retroactively edited volumes 322–325 (1944–1946).

- 322 ^{B}
- 323 ^{B}
- 324 ^{B}
- 325 ^{B}
- 326
- 327
- 328
- 329
- 330
- 331
- 332
- 333
- 334
- 335
- 336
- 337
- 338
- 339
- 340
- 341
- 342
- 343
- 344
- 345
- 346
- 347
- 348
- 349
- 350
- 351
- 352
- 353
- 354
- 355
- 356
- 357
- 358
- 359
- 360
- 361
- 362
- 363
- 364
- 365
- 366
- 367
- 368
- 369
- 370
- 371
- 372
- 373
- 374
- 375

== Edited by Putzel (1964–1979) ==
Volumes edited by Henry Putzel Jr., tenure 1964–1979.

- 376
- 377
- 378
- 379
- 380
- 381
- 382
- 383
- 384
- 385
- 386
- 387
- 388
- 389
- 390
- 391
- 392
- 393
- 394
- 395
- 396
- 397
- 398
- 399
- 400
- 401
- 402
- 403
- 404
- 405
- 406
- 407
- 408
- 409
- 410
- 411
- 412
- 413
- 414
- 415
- 416
- 417
- 418
- 419
- 420
- 421
- 422
- 423
- 424
- 425
- 426
- 427
- 428
- 429
- 430
- 431
- 432
- 433
- 434
- 435
- 436
- 437
- 438
- 439
- 440
- 441
- 442
- 443
- 444

== Edited by Lind (1979–1987) ==
Volumes edited by Henry Curtis Lind, tenure 1979–1987.

- 445
- 446
- 447
- 448
- 449
- 450
- 451
- 452
- 453
- 454
- 455
- 456
- 457
- 458
- 459
- 460
- 461
- 462
- 463
- 464
- 465
- 466
- 467
- 468
- 469
- 470
- 471
- 472
- 473
- 474
- 475
- 476
- 477
- 478
- 479

== Edited by Wagner (1987–2010) ==
Volumes edited by Frank D. Wagner, 1987–2010.

- 480
- 481
- 482
- 483
- 484
- 485
- 486
- 487
- 488
- 489
- 490
- 491
- 492
- 493
- 494
- 495
- 496
- 497
- 498
- 499
- 500
- 501
- 502
- 503
- 504
- 505
- 506
- 507
- 508
- 509
- 510
- 511
- 512
- 513
- 514
- 515
- 516
- 517
- 518
- 519
- 520
- 521
- 522
- 523
- 524
- 525
- 526
- 527
- 528
- 529
- 530
- 531
- 532
- 533
- 534
- 535
- 536
- 537
- 538
- 539
- 540
- 541
- 542
- 543
- 544
- 545
- 546
- 547
- 548
- 549
- 550
- 551
- 552
- 553
- 554
- 555
- 556
- 557
- 558
- 559
- 560
- 561

== Edited by Fallon (2011–2020) ==
Volumes edited by Christine Luchok Fallon, tenure 2011–2020.

- 562
- 563
- 564
- 565
- 566
- 567
- 568
- 569
- 570
- 571
- 572
- 573
- 574
- 575
- 576
- 577
- 578
- 579
- 580
- 581
- 582
- 583
- 584
- 585
- 586
- 587
- 588
- 589
- 590
- 591

== Edited by Womeldorf (2021–present) ==
Volumes edited by Rebecca Anne Womeldorf, tenure 2021–present.

- 592
- 593
- 594
- 595
- 596
- 597
- 598
- 599
- 600
- 601
- 602
- 603
- 604
- 605
- 606
- 607
- 608
- 609

== See also ==
- Lists of United States Supreme Court cases
- Number of U.S. Supreme Court cases decided by year

== Notes ==
- ^A The first volume of the United States Reports predates the creation of the Supreme Court and does not contain any of its decisions. It is designated volume one because the same reporter, Alexander J. Dallas, published volumes 1–4.
- ^B Ernest Knaebel resigned as Reporter of Decisions in 1944, and the post was vacant for two years. When Walter Wyatt took office in 1946, he edited the volumes 322–325 with cases for the preceding years.
