= List of United States Supreme Court cases, volume 50 =

Supreme Court of the United States
- Interactive map of Supreme Court of the United States
- 38°53′26″N 77°00′16″W
- Established: March 4, 1789; 236 years ago
- Location: Washington, D.C.
- Coordinates: 38°53′26″N 77°00′16″W
- Composition method: Presidential nomination with Senate confirmation
- Authorised by: Constitution of the United States, Art. III, § 1
- Judge term length: life tenure, subject to impeachment and removal
- Number of positions: 9 (by statute)
- Website: supremecourt.gov

This is a list of cases reported in volume 50 (9 How.) of United States Reports, decided by the Supreme Court of the United States in 1850.

== Nominative reports ==
In 1874, the U.S. government created the United States Reports, and retroactively numbered older privately published case reports as part of the new series. As a result, cases appearing in volumes 1–90 of U.S. Reports have dual citation forms; one for the volume number of U.S. Reports, and one for the volume number of the reports named for the relevant reporter of decisions (these are called "nominative reports").

=== Benjamin Chew Howard ===
Starting with the 42nd volume of U.S. Reports, the Reporter of Decisions of the Supreme Court of the United States was Benjamin Chew Howard. Howard was Reporter of Decisions from 1843 to 1860, covering volumes 42 through 65 of United States Reports which correspond to volumes 1 through 24 of his Howard's Reports. As such, the dual form of citation to, for example, Pennsylvania v. Wheeling & Belmont Bridge Co. is 50 U.S. (9 How.) 647 (1850).

== Justices of the Supreme Court at the time of 50 U.S. (9 How.) ==
The Supreme Court is established by Article III, Section 1 of the Constitution of the United States, which says: "The judicial Power of the United States, shall be vested in one supreme Court . . .". The size of the Court is not specified; the Constitution leaves it to Congress to set the number of justices. Under the Judiciary Act of 1789 Congress originally fixed the number of justices at six (one chief justice and five associate justices). Since 1789 Congress has varied the size of the Court from six to seven, nine, ten, and back to nine justices (always including one chief justice).

When the cases in 50 U.S. (9 How.) were decided the Court comprised these nine members:

Portrait	Justice	Office	Home State	Succeeded	Date confirmed by the Senate (Vote)	Tenure on Supreme Court
	Roger B. Taney	Chief Justice	Maryland	John Marshall	March 15, 1836 (29–15)	March 28, 1836 – October 12, 1864 (Died)
	John McLean	Associate Justice	Ohio	Robert Trimble	March 7, 1829 (Acclamation)	January 11, 1830 – April 4, 1861 (Died)
	James Moore Wayne	Associate Justice	Georgia	William Johnson	January 9, 1835 (Acclamation)	January 14, 1835 – July 5, 1867 (Died)
	John Catron	Associate Justice	Tennessee	newly created seat	March 8, 1837 (28–15)	May 1, 1837 – May 30, 1865 (Died)
	John McKinley	Associate Justice	Alabama	newly created seat	September 25, 1837 (Acclamation)	January 9, 1838 – July 19, 1852 (Died)
	Peter Vivian Daniel	Associate Justice	Virginia	Philip P. Barbour	March 2, 1841 (25–5)	January 10, 1842 – May 31, 1860 (Died)
	Samuel Nelson	Associate Justice	New York	Smith Thompson	February 14, 1845 (Acclamation)	February 27, 1845 – November 28, 1872 (Retired)
	Levi Woodbury	Associate Justice	New Hampshire	Joseph Story	January 31, 1846 (Acclamation)	September 23, 1845 – September 4, 1851 (Died)
	Robert Cooper Grier	Associate Justice	Pennsylvania	Henry Baldwin	August 4, 1846 (Acclamation)	August 10, 1846 – January 31, 1870 (Retired)

== Citation style ==
Under the Judiciary Act of 1789 the federal court structure at the time comprised District Courts, which had general trial jurisdiction; Circuit Courts, which had mixed trial and appellate (from the US District Courts) jurisdiction; and the United States Supreme Court, which had appellate jurisdiction over the federal District and Circuit courts—and for certain issues over state courts. The Supreme Court also had limited original jurisdiction (i.e., in which cases could be filed directly with the Supreme Court without first having been heard by a lower federal or state court). There were one or more federal District Courts and/or Circuit Courts in each state, territory, or other geographical region.

Bluebook citation style is used for case names, citations, and jurisdictions.

- "C.C.D." = United States Circuit Court for the District of . . .
  - e.g.,"C.C.D.N.J." = United States Circuit Court for the District of New Jersey
- "D." = United States District Court for the District of . . .
  - e.g.,"D. Mass." = United States District Court for the District of Massachusetts
- "E." = Eastern; "M." = Middle; "N." = Northern; "S." = Southern; "W." = Western
  - e.g.,"C.C.S.D.N.Y." = United States Circuit Court for the Southern District of New York
  - e.g.,"M.D. Ala." = United States District Court for the Middle District of Alabama
- "Ct. Cl." = United States Court of Claims
- The abbreviation of a state's name alone indicates the highest appellate court in that state's judiciary at the time.
  - e.g.,"Pa." = Supreme Court of Pennsylvania
  - e.g.,"Me." = Supreme Judicial Court of Maine

== List of cases in 50 U.S. (9 How.) ==
Case Name	Page and year	Opinion of the Court	Concurring opinion(s)	Dissenting opinion(s)	Lower court	Disposition
Almonester v. Kenton	1 (1850)	Catron	none	none	La.	dismissed
Irwin v. Dixion	10 (1850)	Woodbury	none	none	C.C.D.C.	reversed
Walden v. Bodley's Heirs	34 (1850)	Catron	none	none	C.C.D. Ky.	multiple
Wheeler v. Smith	55 (1850)	McLean	none	none	C.C.D.C.	reversed
United States v. Price	83 (1850)	Grier	none	Woodbury	C.C.E.D. Pa.	affirmed
Wilson v. Simpson	109 (1850)	Wayne	none	none	C.C.D. La.	affirmed
United States v. Reynes	127 (1850)	Daniel	none	none	D. La.	reversed
La Roche v. Jones's Lessee	155 (1850)	Catron	none	none	C.C.S.D. Miss.	reversed
Perrine v. Chesapeake and Delaware Canal Company	172 (1850)	Taney	none	McLean	C.C.D. Del.	certification
Neves v. Scott	196 (1850)	Nelson	none	none	C.C.D. Ga.	reversed
Withers v. Greene	213 (1850)	Daniel	none	Nelson	C.C.S.D. Ala.	reversed
Benner v. Porter	235 (1850)	Nelson	none	none	S.D. Fla.	reversed
Mason v. Fearson	248 (1850)	Woodbury	none	none	C.C.D.C.	reversed
Strader v. Baldwin	261 (1850)	Grier	none	none	Ohio	dismissed
Brabston v. Gibson	263 (1850)	McLean	none	none	C.C.D. La.	reversed
Davis v. Concordia Parish	280 (1850)	Wayne	none	none	La.	affirmed
Humphreys v. Smith	297 (1850)	Grier	none	none	C.C.S.D. Miss.	reversed
Lytle v. Arkansas	314 (1850)	McLean	none	Catron	Ark.	reversed
Boswell's Lessee v. Otis	336 (1850)	McLean	none	none	C.C.D. Ohio	certification
United States v. Briggs	351 (1850)	Catron	none	none	C.C.D. Mich.	certification
Gaines v. Nicholson	356 (1850)	Nelson	none	none	C.C.S.D. Miss.	reversed
Barrow v. Reab	366 (1850)	Woodbury	none	none	C.C.D. La.	affirmed
Harrison v. Vose	372 (1850)	Woodbury	none	none	C.C.D. Me.	certification
Hill v. United States	386 (1850)	Daniel	none	none	C.C.S.D. Miss.	certification
Tayloe v. Merchants' Fire Insurance Company	390 (1850)	Nelson	none	Catron	C.C.D. Md.	reversed
Townsend v. Jemison	407 (1850)	Wayne	none	none	M.D. Ala.	affirmed
Doe v. Eslava	421 (1850)	Woodbury	none	none	Ala.	affirmed
Doe v. City of Mobile	451 (1850)	Woodbury	none	none	Ala.	affirmed
Goodtitle v. Kibbe	471 (1850)	Taney	none	none	Ala.	affirmed
Atkinson's Lessee v. Cummins	479 (1850)	Grier	none	none	C.C.W.D. Pa.	affirmed
Brown v. United States	487 (1850)	Daniel	none	none	C.C.D.C.	reversed
United States v. Roberts	501 (1850)	Wayne	none	none	C.C.D. Ill.	reversed
Bank of Alabama v. Dalton	522 (1850)	Catron	none	none	N.D. Miss.	affirmed
Bayard v. Lombard	530 (1850)	Grier	none	none	C.C.E.D. Pa.	affirmed
Lamert v. Ghiselin	552 (1850)	Taney	none	none	C.C.D. Md.	certification
United States v. Marigold	560 (1850)	Daniel	none	none	C.C.N.D.N.Y.	certification
Forsyth v. United States	571 (1850)	Nelson	none	none	N.D. Fla.	reversed
Simpson v. United States	578 (1850)	Nelson	none	none	N.D. Fla.	reversed
Cotton v. United States	579 (1850)	Nelson	none	none	N.D. Fla.	continued
Baldwin v. Ely	580 (1850)	Taney	none	none	C.C.D.C.	reversed
Hogan v. Ross	602 (1850)	per curiam	none	none	N.D. Miss.	dismissed
Fleming v. Page	603 (1850)	Taney	none	none	C.C.E.D. Pa.	certification
Marriott v. Brune	619 (1850)	Woodbury	none	none	C.C.D. Md.	affirmed
United States v. Southmayd	637 (1850)	Woodbury	none	none	C.C.S.D.N.Y.	affirmed
Wheeling and Belmont Bridge Company	647 (1850)	Nelson	none	Daniels	original	referred to commissioner

== See also ==
- Certificate of division
