= List of United States Supreme Court cases, volume 12 =

Supreme Court of the United States
- Interactive map of Supreme Court of the United States
- 38°53′26″N 77°00′16″W
- Established: March 4, 1789; 237 years ago
- Location: Washington, D.C.
- Coordinates: 38°53′26″N 77°00′16″W
- Composition method: Presidential nomination with Senate confirmation
- Authorised by: Constitution of the United States, Art. III, § 1
- Judge term length: life tenure, subject to impeachment and removal
- Number of positions: 9 (by statute)
- Website: supremecourt.gov

This is a list of cases reported in volume 12 (8 Cranch) of United States Reports, decided by the Supreme Court of the United States in 1814.

== Nominative reports ==
In 1874, the U.S. government created the United States Reports, and retroactively numbered older privately published case reports as part of the new series. As a result, cases appearing in volumes 1–90 of U.S. Reports have dual citation forms; one for the volume number of U.S. Reports, and one for the volume number of the reports named for the relevant reporter of decisions (these are called "nominative reports").

=== William Cranch ===
Starting with the 5th volume of U.S. Reports, the Reporter of Decisions of the Supreme Court of the United States was William Cranch. Cranch was Reporter of Decisions from 1801 to 1815, covering volumes 5 through 13 of United States Reports which correspond to volumes 1 through 9 of his Cranch's Reports. As such, the dual form of citation to, for example, Hall v. Leigh is 12 U.S. (8 Cranch) 50 (1814).

== Justices of the Supreme Court at the time of 12 U.S. (8 Cranch) ==
The Supreme Court is established by Article III, Section 1 of the Constitution of the United States, which says: "The judicial Power of the United States, shall be vested in one supreme Court . . .". The size of the Court is not specified; the Constitution leaves it to Congress to set the number of justices. Under the Judiciary Act of 1789 Congress originally fixed the number of justices at six (one chief justice and five associate justices). Since 1789 Congress has varied the size of the Court from six to seven, nine, ten, and back to nine justices (always including one chief justice).

When the cases in 12 U.S. (8 Cranch) were decided, the Court comprised these seven justices:

Portrait	Justice	Office	Home State	Succeeded	Date confirmed by the Senate (Vote)	Tenure on Supreme Court
	John Marshall	Chief Justice	Virginia	Oliver Ellsworth	January 27, 1801 (Acclamation)	February 4, 1801 – July 6, 1835 (Died)
	Bushrod Washington	Associate Justice	Virginia	James Wilson	December 20, 1798 (Acclamation)	November 9, 1798 (Recess Appointment) – November 26, 1829 (Died)
	William Johnson	Associate Justice	South Carolina	Alfred Moore	March 24, 1804 (Acclamation)	May 7, 1804 – August 4, 1834 (Died)
	Henry Brockholst Livingston	Associate Justice	New York	William Paterson	December 17, 1806 (Acclamation)	January 20, 1807 – March 18, 1823 (Died)
	Thomas Todd	Associate Justice	Kentucky	new seat	March 2, 1807 (Acclamation)	March 3, 1807 – February 7, 1826 (Died)
	Gabriel Duvall	Associate Justice	Maryland	Samuel Chase	November 18, 1811 (Acclamation)	November 23, 1811 – January 12, 1835 (Resigned)
	Joseph Story	Associate Justice	Massachusetts	William Cushing	November 18, 1811 (Acclamation)	February 3, 1812 – September 10, 1845 (Died)

== Notable case in 12 U.S. (8 Cranch) ==
=== United States v. 1960 Bags of Coffee ===
United States v. 1960 Bags of Coffee, 12 U.S. (8 Cranch) 398 (1814), is an example of a case in rem. In rem jurisdiction ("power about or against the thing") is a legal term describing the power a court may exercise over property (either real or personal) or a "status" against a person over whom the court does not have in personam jurisdiction. Jurisdiction in rem assumes the property or status is the primary object of the action, rather than personal liabilities not necessarily associated with the property. In this case the coffee had been seized for being imported in violation of the Non-Intercourse Act of 1809.

== Citation style ==
Under the Judiciary Act of 1789 the federal court structure at the time comprised District Courts, which had general trial jurisdiction; Circuit Courts, which had mixed trial and appellate (from the US District Courts) jurisdiction; and the United States Supreme Court, which had appellate jurisdiction over the federal District and Circuit courts—and for certain issues over state courts. The Supreme Court also had limited original jurisdiction (i.e., in which cases could be filed directly with the Supreme Court without first having been heard by a lower federal or state court). There were one or more federal District Courts and/or Circuit Courts in each state, territory, or other geographical region.

Bluebook citation style is used for case names, citations, and jurisdictions.

- "C.C.D." = United States Circuit Court for the District of . . .
  - e.g.,"C.C.D.N.J." = United States Circuit Court for the District of New Jersey
- "D." = United States District Court for the District of . . .
  - e.g.,"D. Mass." = United States District Court for the District of Massachusetts
- "E." = Eastern; "M." = Middle; "N." = Northern; "S." = Southern; "W." = Western
  - e.g.,"C.C.S.D.N.Y." = United States Circuit Court for the Southern District of New York
  - e.g.,"M.D. Ala." = United States District Court for the Middle District of Alabama
- "Ct. Cl." = United States Court of Claims
- The abbreviation of a state's name alone indicates the highest appellate court in that state's judiciary at the time.
  - e.g.,"Pa." = Supreme Court of Pennsylvania
  - e.g.,"Me." = Supreme Judicial Court of Maine

== List of cases in 12 U.S. (8 Cranch) ==
Case Name	Page and year	Opinion of the Court	Concurring opinion(s)	Dissenting opinion(s)	Lower Court	Disposition
Griffith v. Frazier	9 (1814)	Marshall	none	none	C.C.D.S.C.	affirmed
Van Ness v. Forrest	30 (1814)	Marshall	none	none	C.C.D.C.	affirmed
Bank of Alexandria v. Herbet	36 (1814)	Marshall	none	none	C.C.D.C.	affirmed
Marcardier v. Chesapeake Insurance Company	39 (1814)	Story	none	none	C.C.D. Md.	reversed
Hall v. Leigh	50 (1814)	Livingston	none	none	C.C.D. Md.	reversed
City of Alexandria v. Preston	53 (1814)	per curiam	none	none	C.C.D.C.	affirmed
Pleasants v. Maryland Insurance Company	55 (1814)	Johnson	none	none	C.C.D. Md.	reversed
McCall v. Marine Insurance Company	59 (1814)	Story	none	none	C.C.D. Md.	affirmed
Smith v. Edrington	66 (1814)	Washington	none	none	C.C.D. Va.	affirmed
Beale v. Thompson	70 (1814)	Story	none	none	C.C.D.C.	affirmed
Clementson v. Williams	72 (1814)	Marshall	none	none	C.C.D.C.	affirmed
Gracie v. Marine Insurance Company	75 (1814)	Marshall	none	none	C.C.D. Md.	affirmed
Richards v. Maryland Insurance Company	84 (1814)	Johnson	none	none	C.C.D. Md.	affirmed
Gracie v. Maryland Insurance Company	84 (1814)	per curiam	none	none	not indicated	affirmed
Crowell v. M'Fadon	94 (1814)	Duvall	none	none	Mass.	reversed
Beatty's Administrators v. Burnes's Administrators	98 (1814)	Story	none	none	C.C.D.C.	affirmed
Harford v. United States	109 (1814)	Story	none	none	C.C.D.S.C.	affirmed
Brown v. United States	110 (1814)	Marshall	none	Story	C.C.D. Mass.	reversed
The Rapid	155 (1814)	Johnson	none	none	C.C.D. Mass.	affirmed
The Alexander	169 (1814)	Marshall	none	none	C.C.D. Mass.	affirmed
The Julia	181 (1814)	Story	none	none	C.C.D. Mass.	affirmed
The Aurora	203 (1814)	Livingston	none	none	C.C.D.R.I.	affirmed
The Adventure	221 (1814)	Johnson	none	none	C.C.D. Va.	reversed
Green v. Liter	229 (1814)	Story	none	none	C.C.D.R.I.	certification
Carter's Heirs v. Cutting	251 (1814)	Story	none	none	C.C.D.C.	reversed
The Venus	253 (1814)	Washington	Story, Marshall	none	C.C.D. Mass.	multiple
The Merrimack	317 (1814)	Marshall	Story	Story	C.C.D. Md.	multiple
The Frances I	335 (1814)	Marshall	none	none	C.C.D.R.I.	affirmed
The Frances II	348 (1814)	Marshall	none	none	C.C.D.R.I.	certification
The Frances III	354 (1814)	Marshall	none	none	C.C.D.R.I.	certification
The Frances IV	358 (1814)	Marshall	none	none	C.C.D.R.I.	affirmed
The Frances V	359 (1814)	Washington	none	none	C.C.D.R.I.	affirmed
The Frances VI	363 (1814)	Marshall	none	none	C.C.D.R.I.	affirmed
Vowles v. Craig	371 (1814)	Todd	none	none	C.C.D. Ky.	affirmed
The Sally	382 (1814)	Story	none	none	C.C.D. Mass.	affirmed
The Euphrates	385 (1814)	Livingston	none	none	C.C.D.R.I.	affirmed
The Mary	388 (1814)	per curiam	none	none	C.C.D.R.I.	certification
United States v. 1960 Bags of Coffee	398 (1814)	Johnson	none	none	C.C.D. Md.	reversed
The Brigantine Mars	417 (1814)	Johnson	none	none	C.C.D. Mass.	reversed
The Frances VII	418 (1814)	Washington	none	Livingston	C.C.D.R.I.	affirmed
The Thomas Gibbons	421 (1814)	Story	none	none	C.C.D. Ga.	affirmed
Prince v. Bartlett	431 (1814)	Duvall	none	none	Mass.	affirmed
The St. Lawrence	434 (1814)	Livingston	none	none	C.C.D.N.H.	affirmed
The Hiram	444 (1814)	Washington	none	none	C.C.D. Mass.	reversed
The Joseph	451 (1814)	Washington	none	none	C.C.D. Mass.	affirmed
The Grotius	456 (1814)	Washington	none	none	C.C.D. Mass.	certification
Alexander v. Pendleton	462 (1814)	Marshall	none	none	C.C.D.C.	affirmed
Pratt v. Carroll	471 (1814)	Marshall	none	none	C.C.D.C.	reversed

== See also ==
- certificate of division
