= List of United States Supreme Court cases, volume 34 =

Supreme Court of the United States
- Interactive map of Supreme Court of the United States
- 38°53′26″N 77°00′16″W
- Established: March 4, 1789; 237 years ago
- Location: Washington, D.C.
- Coordinates: 38°53′26″N 77°00′16″W
- Composition method: Presidential nomination with Senate confirmation
- Authorised by: Constitution of the United States, Art. III, § 1
- Judge term length: life tenure, subject to impeachment and removal
- Number of positions: 9 (by statute)
- Website: supremecourt.gov

This is a list of cases reported in volume 34 (9 Pet.) of United States Reports, decided by the Supreme Court of the United States in 1835.

== Nominative reports ==
In 1874, the U.S. government created the United States Reports, and retroactively numbered older privately-published case reports as part of the new series. As a result, cases appearing in volumes 1–90 of U.S. Reports have dual citation forms; one for the volume number of U.S. Reports, and one for the volume number of the reports named for the relevant reporter of decisions (these are called "nominative reports").

=== Richard Peters, Jr. ===
Starting with the 26th volume of U.S. Reports, the Reporter of Decisions of the Supreme Court of the United States was Richard Peters, Jr. Peters was Reporter of Decisions from 1828 to 1843, covering volumes 26 through 41 of United States Reports which correspond to volumes 1 through 16 of his Peters's Reports. As such, the dual form of citation to, for example, Scott v. Lloyd is 34 U.S. (9 Pet.) 418 (1835).

== Justices of the Supreme Court at the time of 34 U.S. (9 Pet.) ==
The Supreme Court is established by Article III, Section 1 of the Constitution of the United States, which says: "The judicial Power of the United States, shall be vested in one supreme Court . . .". The size of the Court is not specified; the Constitution leaves it to Congress to set the number of justices. Under the Judiciary Act of 1789 Congress originally fixed the number of justices at six (one chief justice and five associate justices). Since 1789 Congress has varied the size of the Court from six to seven, nine, ten, and back to nine justices (always including one chief justice).

When the cases in 34 U.S. (9 Pet.) were decided, the Court comprised these six justices (Gabriel Duvall retired before the start of the 1835 term due to deafness, and so the Court temporarily had only six members):

Portrait	Justice	Office	Home State	Succeeded	Date confirmed by the Senate (Vote)	Tenure on Supreme Court
	John Marshall	Chief Justice	Virginia	Oliver Ellsworth	January 27, 1801 (Acclamation)	February 4, 1801 – July 6, 1835 (Died)
	Joseph Story	Associate Justice	Massachusetts	William Cushing	November 18, 1811 (Acclamation)	February 3, 1812 – September 10, 1845 (Died)
	Smith Thompson	Associate Justice	New York	Henry Brockholst Livingston	December 9, 1823 (Acclamation)	September 1, 1823 – December 18, 1843 (Died)
	John McLean	Associate Justice	Ohio	Robert Trimble	March 7, 1829 (Acclamation)	January 11, 1830 – April 4, 1861 (Died)
	Henry Baldwin	Associate Justice	Pennsylvania	Bushrod Washington	January 6, 1830 (41–2)	January 18, 1830 – April 21, 1844 (Died)
	James Moore Wayne	Associate Justice	Georgia	William Johnson	January 9, 1835 (Acclamation)	January 14, 1835 – July 5, 1867 (Died)

== Citation style ==
Under the Judiciary Act of 1789 the federal court structure at the time comprised District Courts, which had general trial jurisdiction; Circuit Courts, which had mixed trial and appellate (from the US District Courts) jurisdiction; and the United States Supreme Court, which had appellate jurisdiction over the federal District and Circuit courts—and for certain issues over state courts. The Supreme Court also had limited original (i.e., in which cases could be filed directly with the Supreme Court without first having been heard by a lower federal or state court). There were one or more federal District Courts and/or Circuit Courts in each state, territory, or other geographical region.

Bluebook citation style is used for case names, citations, and jurisdictions.

- "C.C.D." = United States Circuit Court for the District of . . .
  - e.g.,"C.C.D.N.J." = United States Circuit Court for the District of New Jersey
- "D." = United States District Court for the District of . . .
  - e.g.,"D. Mass." = United States District Court for the District of Massachusetts
- "E." = Eastern; "M." = Middle; "N." = Northern; "S." = Southern; "W." = Western
  - e.g.,"C.C.S.D.N.Y." = United States Circuit Court for the Southern District of New York
  - e.g.,"M.D. Ala." = United States District Court for the Middle District of Alabama
- "Ct. Cl." = United States Court of Claims
- The abbreviation of a state's name alone indicates the highest appellate court in that state's judiciary at the time.
  - e.g.,"Pa." = Supreme Court of Pennsylvania
  - e.g.,"Me." = Supreme Judicial Court of Maine

== List of cases in 34 U.S. (9 Pet.) ==
Case Name	Page & year	Opinion of the Court	Concurring opinion(s)	Dissenting opinion(s)	Lower Court	Disposition
Brown v. Swann	1 (1835)	Marshall	none	none	C.C.D.C.	dismissed
Smith's Lessee v. Trabue's Heirs	4 (1835)	Marshall	none	none	C.C.D. Ky.	dismissed
United States v. Nourse	8 (1835)	Marshall	none	none	C.C.D.C.	affirmed
Bank of Alexandria v. Swann	33 (1835)	Thompson	none	none	C.C.D.C.	reversed
Bank of Ga. v. Higginbottom	48 (1835)	McLean	none	none	C.C.D.S.C.	affirmed
Coulson v. Walton	62 (1835)	McLean	none	none	C.C.D.W. Tenn.	affirmed
City of New York v. Miln	85 (1835)	Marshall	none	none	multiple	continued
Caldwell v. Carrington's Heirs	86 (1835)	Marshall	none	none	C.C.D. Ky.	affirmed
Bradley v. Washington, A. & G.S.P. Co.	107 (1835)	Marshall	none	none	C.C.D.C.	reversed
Delassus v. United States	117 (1835)	Marshall	none	none	D. Mo.	reversed
Chouteau's Heirs v. United States I	137 (1835)	Marshall	none	none	D. Mo.	reversed
Chouteau's Heirs v. United States II	147 (1835)	Marshall	none	none	D. Mo.	reversed
Hiriart v. Ballon	156 (1835)	Story	none	none	E.D. La.	affirmed
United States v. Clarke	168 (1835)	Marshall	none	none	Fla. Super. Ct.	affirmed
United States v. Huertas	171 (1835)	Marshall	none	none	Fla. Super. Ct.	multiple
Tarver v. Tarver	174 (1835)	Thompson	none	none	S.D. Ala.	reversed
Field v. United States	182 (1835)	Marshall	none	none	E.D. La.	reversed
King's Heirs v. Thompson	204 (1835)	McLean	none	none	C.C.D.C.	reversed
City of New Orleans v. de Armas	224 (1835)	Marshall	none	none	La.	dismissed
United States v. Bailey I	238 (1835)	Story	none	none	C.C.D. Ky.	certification
United States v. Bailey II	267 (1835)	Marshall	none	none	C.C.D. Ky.	certification
Boyce's Ex'rs v. Grundy	275 (1835)	Story	none	none	C.C.D.W. Tenn.	reversed
Greenleaf v. Birth	292 (1835)	McLean	none	none	C.C.D.C.	reversed
Beard v. Rowan	301 (1835)	Thompson	none	none	C.C.D. Ky.	affirmed
United States v. Robeson	319 (1835)	McLean	none	none	E.D. La.	reversed
Beers v. Haughton	329 (1835)	Story	none	Thompson, Baldwin	C.C.D. Ohio	affirmed
Bank of the U.S. v. Waggener	378 (1835)	Story	none	none	C.C.D. Ky.	reversed
Piatt v. Vattier	405 (1835)	Story	none	none	C.C.D. Ohio	affirmed
Scott v. Lloyd	418 (1835)	Marshall	none	none	C.C.D.C.	reversed
Fenwick v. Chapman	461 (1835)	Wayne	none	none	C.C.D.C.	affirmed
Harrison v. Nixon	483 (1835)	Story	none	Baldwin	C.C.E.D. Pa.	reversed
Chesapeake & O. Canal Co. v. Knapp	541 (1835)	McLean	none	none	C.C.D.C.	affirmed
Life & Fire Ins. Co. v. Adams I	571 (1835)	Marshall	none	none	E.D. La.	continued
Life & Fire Ins. Co. v. Adams II	573 (1835)	Marshall	McLean	none	E.D. La.	mandamus denied
Owings v. Hull	607 (1835)	Story	none	none	C.C.D. Md.	reversed
Livingston v. Story	632 (1835)	Thompson	McLean	none	E.D. La.	reversed
Winn v. Patterson	663 (1835)	Story	none	none	C.C.D. Ga.	affirmed
The Brig Burdett	682 (1835)	McLean	none	none	C.C.D. Md.	affirmed
Urtetiqui v. Arcy	692 (1835)	Thompson	none	none	C.C.D. Md.	reversed
Ex parte Milburn	704 (1835)	Story	none	none	C.C.D.C.	habeas corpus denied
Mitchel v. United States	711 (1835)	Baldwin	none	none	Fla. Super. Ct.	multiple

== See also ==
- certificate of division
