= List of United States Supreme Court cases, volume 42 =

Supreme Court of the United States
- Interactive map of Supreme Court of the United States
- 38°53′26″N 77°00′16″W
- Established: March 4, 1789; 236 years ago
- Location: Washington, D.C.
- Coordinates: 38°53′26″N 77°00′16″W
- Composition method: Presidential nomination with Senate confirmation
- Authorised by: Constitution of the United States, Art. III, § 1
- Judge term length: life tenure, subject to impeachment and removal
- Number of positions: 9 (by statute)
- Website: supremecourt.gov

This is a list of cases reported in volume 42 (1 How.) of United States Reports, decided by the Supreme Court of the United States in 1843.

== Nominative reports ==
In 1874, the U.S. government created the United States Reports, and retroactively numbered older privately-published case reports as part of the new series. As a result, cases appearing in volumes 1–90 of U.S. Reports have dual citation forms; one for the volume number of U.S. Reports, and one for the volume number of the reports named for the relevant reporter of decisions (these are called "nominative reports").

=== Benjamin Chew Howard ===
Starting with the 42nd volume of U.S. Reports, the Reporter of Decisions of the Supreme Court of the United States was Benjamin Chew Howard. Howard was Reporter of Decisions from 1843 to 1860, covering volumes 42 through 65 of United States Reports which correspond to volumes 1 through 24 of his Howard's Reports. As such, the dual form of citation to, for example, Williams v. United States is 42 U.S. (1 How.) 290 (1843).

== Justices of the Supreme Court at the time of 42 U.S. (1 How.) ==
The Supreme Court is established by Article III, Section 1 of the Constitution of the United States, which says: "The judicial Power of the United States, shall be vested in one supreme Court . . .". The size of the Court is not specified; the Constitution leaves it to Congress to set the number of justices. Under the Judiciary Act of 1789 Congress originally fixed the number of justices at six (one chief justice and five associate justices). Since 1789 Congress has varied the size of the Court from six to seven, nine, ten, and back to nine justices (always including one chief justice).

When the cases in 42 U.S. (1 How.) were decided the Court comprised these nine justices:

Portrait	Justice	Office	Home State	Succeeded	Date confirmed by the Senate (Vote)	Tenure on Supreme Court
	Roger B. Taney	Chief Justice	Maryland	John Marshall	March 15, 1836 (29–15)	March 28, 1836 – October 12, 1864 (Died)
	Joseph Story	Associate Justice	Massachusetts	William Cushing	November 18, 1811 (Acclamation)	February 3, 1812 – September 10, 1845 (Died)
	Smith Thompson	Associate Justice	New York	Henry Brockholst Livingston	December 9, 1823 (Acclamation)	September 1, 1823 – December 18, 1843 (Died)
	John McLean	Associate Justice	Ohio	Robert Trimble	March 7, 1829 (Acclamation)	January 11, 1830 – April 4, 1861 (Died)
	Henry Baldwin	Associate Justice	Pennsylvania	Bushrod Washington	January 6, 1830 (41–2)	January 18, 1830 – April 21, 1844 (Died)
	James Moore Wayne	Associate Justice	Georgia	William Johnson	January 9, 1835 (Acclamation)	January 14, 1835 – July 5, 1867 (Died)
	John Catron	Associate Justice	Tennessee	newly created seat	March 8, 1837 (28–15)	May 1, 1837 – May 30, 1865 (Died)
	John McKinley	Associate Justice	Alabama	newly created seat	September 25, 1837 (Acclamation)	January 9, 1838 – July 19, 1852 (Died)
	Peter Vivian Daniel	Associate Justice	Virginia	Philip P. Barbour	March 2, 1841 (25–5)	January 10, 1842 – May 31, 1860 (Died)

== Citation style ==
Under the Judiciary Act of 1789 the federal court structure at the time comprised District Courts, which had general trial jurisdiction; Circuit Courts, which had mixed trial and appellate (from the US District Courts) jurisdiction; and the United States Supreme Court, which had appellate jurisdiction over the federal District and Circuit courts—and for certain issues over state courts. The Supreme Court also had limited original jurisdiction (i.e., in which cases could be filed directly with the Supreme Court without first having been heard by a lower federal or state court). There were one or more federal District Courts and/or Circuit Courts in each state, territory, or other geographical region.

Bluebook citation style is used for case names, citations, and jurisdictions.

- "C.C.D." = United States Circuit Court for the District of . . .
  - e.g.,"C.C.D.N.J." = United States Circuit Court for the District of New Jersey
- "D." = United States District Court for the District of . . .
  - e.g.,"D. Mass." = United States District Court for the District of Massachusetts
- "E." = Eastern; "M." = Middle; "N." = Northern; "S." = Southern; "W." = Western
  - e.g.,"C.C.S.D.N.Y." = United States Circuit Court for the Southern District of New York
  - e.g.,"M.D. Ala." = United States District Court for the Middle District of Alabama
- "Ct. Cl." = United States Court of Claims
- The abbreviation of a state's name alone indicates the highest appellate court in that state's judiciary at the time.
  - e.g.,"Pa." = Supreme Court of Pennsylvania
  - e.g.,"Me." = Supreme Judicial Court of Maine

== List of cases in 42 U.S. (1 How.) ==
Case Name	Page & year	Opinion of the Court	Concurring opinion(s)	Dissenting opinion(s)	Lower Court	Disposition
Williams v. Ash	1 (1843)	Taney	none	none	C.C.D.C.	affirmed
Hammond's Administrator v. Washington's Executor	14 (1843)	Daniel	none	none	C.C.D.C.	reversed
United States v. Acosta	24 (1843)	Catron	none	none	Fla. Super. Ct.	affirmed
Smith v. Condry	28 (1843)	Taney	none	none	C.C.D.C.	reversed
Mercer's Lessee v. Selden	37 (1843)	McLean	none	none	C.C.E.D. Va.	affirmed
Buchannon v. Upshaw	56 (1843)	Catron	none	none	C.C.D. Ohio	reversed
Strout v. Foster	89 (1843)	per curiam	none	none	C.C.E.D. La.	affirmed
City of Mobile v. Emanuel	95 (1843)	McLean	none	Catron	Ala.	affirmed
United States v. Linn	104 (1843)	Thompson	none	McLean	C.C.D. Ill.	reversed
Morris v. Nixon's Executor	118 (1843)	Wayne	none	none	C.C.E.D. Pa.	reversed
Second Bank of the United States. v. Beverly	134 (1843)	Baldwin	none	none	C.C.D.C.	reversed
Lloyd v. Hough	153 (1843)	Daniel	none	none	C.C.D.C.	affirmed
McKnight v. Taylor	161 (1843)	Taney	none	none	C.C.D.C.	reversed
Bell v. Bruen	169 (1843)	Catron	none	none	C.C.S.D.N.Y.	reversed
Cartwright v. Howe	188 (1843)	per curiam	none	none	C.C.D.C.	dismissed
Bowman v. Wathen	189 (1843)	Daniel	none	none	C.C.D. Ind.	affirmed
Ellis v. Jones	197 (1843)	per curiam	none	none	C.C.S.D. Ala.	affirmed
McClurg v. Kingsland	202 (1843)	Baldwin	none	none	C.C.W.D. Pa.	affirmed
Connor v. Bradley	211 (1843)	Daniel	none	none	C.C.D.C.	reversed
Jewell's Lessee v. Jewell	219 (1843)	Taney	none	none	C.C.D.S.C.	reversed
Bank of the Metropolis v. New England Bank	234 (1843)	Taney	none	none	C.C.D.C.	reversed
McKenna v. Fisk	241 (1843)	Wayne	none	none	C.C.D.C.	reversed
United States v. Irving	250 (1843)	McLean	none	none	C.C.S.D.N.Y.	certification
Nelson v. Carland	265 (1843)	Taney	none	Catron	C.C.D. Ky.	dismissed
In re Castleman	281 (1843)	per curiam	none	none	C.C.D. Ky.	certification
Taylor v. Savage	282 (1843)	Taney	none	none	N.D. Ala.	dismissed
Minor v. Tillotson	287 (1843)	Taney	none	none	C.C.E.D. La.	dismissed
Todd v. Daniell	289 (1843)	per curiam	none	none	not indicated	affirmed
Williams v. United States	290 (1843)	Daniel	none	none	C.C.D.C.	affirmed
Duncan v. Darst	301 (1843)	Catron	none	none	C.C.E.D. Pa.	affirmed
Bronson v. Kinzie	311 (1843)	Taney	none	McLean	C.C.D. Ill.	certification

== See also ==
- Certificate of division
