= List of United States Supreme Court cases, volume 39 =

Supreme Court of the United States
- Interactive map of Supreme Court of the United States
- 38°53′26″N 77°00′16″W
- Established: March 4, 1789; 237 years ago
- Location: Washington, D.C.
- Coordinates: 38°53′26″N 77°00′16″W
- Composition method: Presidential nomination with Senate confirmation
- Authorised by: Constitution of the United States, Art. III, § 1
- Judge term length: life tenure, subject to impeachment and removal
- Number of positions: 9 (by statute)
- Website: supremecourt.gov

This is a list of cases reported in volume 39 (14 Pet.) of United States Reports, decided by the Supreme Court of the United States in 1840.

== Nominative reports ==
In 1874, the U.S. government created the United States Reports, and retroactively numbered older privately published case reports as part of the new series. As a result, cases appearing in volumes 1–90 of U.S. Reports have dual citation forms; one for the volume number of U.S. Reports, and one for the volume number of the reports named for the relevant reporter of decisions (these are called "nominative reports").

=== Richard Peters, Jr. ===
Starting with the 26th volume of U.S. Reports, the Reporter of Decisions of the Supreme Court of the United States was Richard Peters Jr. Peters was Reporter of Decisions from 1828 to 1843, covering volumes 26 through 41 of United States Reports which correspond to volumes 1 through 16 of his Peters's Reports. As such, the dual form of citation to, for example, Irvine v. Lowry is 39 U.S. (14 Pet.) 293 (1840).

== Justices of the Supreme Court at the time of 39 U.S. (14 Pet.) ==
The Supreme Court is established by Article III, Section 1 of the Constitution of the United States, which says: "The judicial Power of the United States, shall be vested in one supreme Court . . .". The size of the Court is not specified; the Constitution leaves it to Congress to set the number of justices. Under the Judiciary Act of 1789 Congress originally fixed the number of justices at six (one chief justice and five associate justices). Since 1789 Congress has varied the size of the Court from six to seven, nine, ten, and back to nine justices (always including one chief justice).

When the cases in 39 U.S. (14 Pet.) were decided, the Court comprised these nine justices:

Portrait	Justice	Office	Home State	Succeeded	Date confirmed by the Senate (Vote)	Tenure on Supreme Court
	Roger B. Taney	Chief Justice	Maryland	John Marshall	March 15, 1836 (29–15)	March 28, 1836 – October 12, 1864 (Died)
	Joseph Story	Associate Justice	Massachusetts	William Cushing	November 18, 1811 (Acclamation)	February 3, 1812 – September 10, 1845 (Died)
	Smith Thompson	Associate Justice	New York	Henry Brockholst Livingston	December 9, 1823 (Acclamation)	September 1, 1823 – December 18, 1843 (Died)
	John McLean	Associate Justice	Ohio	Robert Trimble	March 7, 1829 (Acclamation)	January 11, 1830 – April 4, 1861 (Died)
	Henry Baldwin	Associate Justice	Pennsylvania	Bushrod Washington	January 6, 1830 (41–2)	January 18, 1830 – April 21, 1844 (Died)
	James Moore Wayne	Associate Justice	Georgia	William Johnson	January 9, 1835 (Acclamation)	January 14, 1835 – July 5, 1867 (Died)
	Philip P. Barbour	Associate Justice	Virginia	Gabriel Duvall	March 15, 1836 (30–11)	May 12, 1836 – February 25, 1841 (Died)
	John Catron	Associate Justice	Tennessee	newly created seat	March 8, 1837 (28–15)	May 1, 1837 – May 30, 1865 (Died)
	John McKinley	Associate Justice	Alabama	newly created seat	September 25, 1837 (Acclamation)	January 9, 1838 – July 19, 1852 (Died)

== Citation style ==
Under the Judiciary Act of 1789 the federal court structure at the time comprised District Courts, which had general trial jurisdiction; Circuit Courts, which had mixed trial and appellate (from the US District Courts) jurisdiction; and the United States Supreme Court, which had appellate jurisdiction over the federal District and Circuit courts—and for certain issues over state courts. The Supreme Court also had limited original jurisdiction (i.e., in which cases could be filed directly with the Supreme Court without first having been heard by a lower federal or state court). There were one or more federal District Courts and/or Circuit Courts in each state, territory, or other geographical region.

Bluebook citation style is used for case names, citations, and jurisdictions.

- "C.C.D." = United States Circuit Court for the District of . . .
  - e.g.,"C.C.D.N.J." = United States Circuit Court for the District of New Jersey
- "D." = United States District Court for the District of . . .
  - e.g.,"D. Mass." = United States District Court for the District of Massachusetts
- "E." = Eastern; "M." = Middle; "N." = Northern; "S." = Southern; "W." = Western
  - e.g.,"C.C.S.D.N.Y." = United States Circuit Court for the Southern District of New York
  - e.g.,"M.D. Ala." = United States District Court for the Middle District of Alabama
- "Ct. Cl." = United States Court of Claims
- The abbreviation of a state's name alone indicates the highest appellate court in that state's judiciary at the time.
  - e.g.,"Pa." = Supreme Court of Pennsylvania
  - e.g.,"Me." = Supreme Judicial Court of Maine

== List of cases in 39 U.S. (14 Pet.) ==
Case Name	Page & year	Opinion of the Court	Concurring opinion(s)	Dissenting opinion(s)	Lower Court	Disposition
Evans v. Gee	1 (1840)	Catron	none	none	C.C.S.D. Ala.	dismissed
Lattimer's Lessee v. Poteet	4 (1840)	McLean	Taney	Catron	C.C.D.N.C.	affirmed
Bank of the Metropolis v. Guttschlick	19 (1840)	Barbour	none	none	C.C.D.C.	affirmed
Kane v. Paul	33 (1840)	Wayne	none	none	C.C.D.C.	affirmed
Covington v. Comstock	43 (1840)	McLean	none	none	C.C.D. Miss.	reversed
Smith v. Chesapeake & O.C. Co.	45 (1840)	McLean	none	none	C.C.D.C.	affirmed
Mitchell v. Lenox	49 (1840)	Taney	none	none	N.Y.	dismissed
West v. Brashear	51 (1840)	Taney	none	none	C.C.D. Ky.	affirmed
Commonwealth Bank v. Griffith	56 (1840)	Taney	none	none	Mo.	dismissed
Commercial & R.R. Bank v. Slocomb, R. & Co.	60 (1840)	Barbour	none	none	C.C.S.D. Miss.	reversed
Suydam v. Broadnax	67 (1840)	Wayne	none	none	C.C.S.D. Ala.	certification
Carr v. Duval	77 (1840)	Catron	none	none	Ct. App. Terr. Fla.	affirmed
Remington v. Linthicum	84 (1840)	Taney	none	none	C.C.D.C.	affirmed
Frevall v. Bache	95 (1840)	Taney	none	none	C.C.D.C.	affirmed
Peters v. Warren Ins. Co.	99 (1840)	Story	none	none	C.C.D. Mass.	certification
Atkins v. N. & K. Dick & Co.	114 (1840)	Barbour	none	none	C.C.S.D. Miss.	reversed
Runyan v. Coster's Lessee	122 (1840)	Thompson	none	none	C.C.E.D. Pa.	affirmed
Preston v. Keene	133 (1840)	Barbour	none	none	C.C.E.D. La.	reversed
Bank of Alexandria v. Dyer	141 (1840)	Taney	none	none	C.C.D.C.	affirmed
Walden's Lessee v. Craig's Heirs	147 (1840)	McLean	none	none	C.C.D. Ky.	reversed
Walden v. Bodley	156 (1840)	McLean	none	none	C.C.D. Ky.	affirmed
Edmonds v. Crenshaw	166 (1840)	McLean	none	none	C.C.S.D. Ala.	reversed
Keene v. Whitaker	170 (1840)	Taney	none	none	C.C.E.D. La.	affirmed
Taylor v. Longworth	172 (1840)	Story	none	none	C.C.D. Ohio	affirmed
Brewer's Lessee v. Blougher	178 (1840)	Taney	none	none	C.C.D. Md.	affirmed
Sprigg v. Bank of Mt. Pleasant	201 (1840)	Thompson	none	none	C.C.D. Ohio	affirmed
Rhode Island v. Massachusetts	210 (1840)	Taney	none	McLean; Catron	original	plea overruled
De Valengin's Adm'rs v. Duffy	282 (1840)	Taney	none	none	C.C.D. Md.	affirmed
Irvine ex rel. Lumberman's Bank v. Lowry	293 (1840)	Baldwin	none	none	C.C.W.D. Pa.	certification
United States v. Knight	301 (1840)	Barbour	none	none	C.C.D. Me.	affirmed
Fowler v. Brantly	318 (1840)	Catron	none	none	C.C.S.D. Ala.	affirmed
Games v. Stiles	322 (1840)	McLean	none	none	C.C.D. Ohio	affirmed
United States v. Wiggins	334 (1840)	Catron	none	none	Fla. Super. Ct.	reversed
Pollard's Lessee v. Kibbe	353 (1840)	Thompson	McLean; Baldwin; Taney	Barbour, Catron	Ala.	reversed
United States v. Wood	430 (1840)	Wayne	none	Thompson	C.C.S.D.N.Y.	certification
Philadelphia and Trenton Railroad v. Stimpson	448 (1840)	Story	none	none	C.C.E.D. Pa.	affirmed
United States v. Morris	464 (1840)	Taney	none	none	C.C.S.D.N.Y.	certification
United States v. Waterman's Heirs	478 (1840)	Baldwin	none	none	Fla. Super. Ct.	affirmed
Brown & Co. v. M'Gran	479 (1840)	Story	none	none	C.C.D. Ga.	reversed
Decatur v. Paulding	497 (1840)	Taney	McLean, Catron	none	C.C.D.C.	affirmed
United States v. Stone	524 (1840)	Taney	none	none	C.C.S.D.N.Y.	certification
United States v. Gratiot	526 (1840)	Thompson	none	none	C.C.D. Ill.	certification
Holmes v. Jennison	540 (1840)	Thompson	Barbour; Catron	Taney	Vt.	dismissed

== See also ==
- Certificate of division
