= List of United States Supreme Court cases, volume 151 =

Supreme Court of the United States
- Interactive map of Supreme Court of the United States
- 38°53′26″N 77°00′16″W
- Established: March 4, 1789; 236 years ago
- Location: Washington, D.C.
- Coordinates: 38°53′26″N 77°00′16″W
- Composition method: Presidential nomination with Senate confirmation
- Authorised by: Constitution of the United States, Art. III, § 1
- Judge term length: life tenure, subject to impeachment and removal
- Number of positions: 9 (by statute)
- Website: supremecourt.gov

This is a list of cases reported in volume 151 of United States Reports, decided by the Supreme Court of the United States in 1894.

== Justices of the Supreme Court at the time of volume 151 U.S. ==
The Supreme Court is established by Article III, Section 1 of the Constitution of the United States, which says: "The judicial Power of the United States, shall be vested in one supreme Court . . .". The size of the Court is not specified; the Constitution leaves it to Congress to set the number of justices. Under the Judiciary Act of 1789 Congress originally fixed the number of justices at six (one chief justice and five associate justices). Since 1789 Congress has varied the size of the Court from six to seven, nine, ten, and back to nine justices (always including one chief justice).

When the cases in volume 151 U.S. were decided the Court comprised the following eight members, after the death of Justice Samuel Blatchford in July 1893:

Portrait	Justice	Office	Home State	Succeeded	Date confirmed by the Senate (Vote)	Tenure on Supreme Court
	Melville Fuller	Chief Justice	Illinois	Morrison Waite	July 20, 1888 (41–20)	October 8, 1888 – July 4, 1910 (Died)
	Stephen Johnson Field	Associate Justice	California	newly created seat	March 10, 1863 (Acclamation)	May 10, 1863 – December 1, 1897 (Retired)
	John Marshall Harlan	Associate Justice	Kentucky	David Davis	November 29, 1877 (Acclamation)	December 10, 1877 – October 14, 1911 (Died)
	Horace Gray	Associate Justice	Massachusetts	Nathan Clifford	December 20, 1881 (51–5)	January 9, 1882 – September 15, 1902 (Died)
	David Josiah Brewer	Associate Justice	Kansas	Stanley Matthews	December 18, 1889 (53–11)	January 6, 1890 – March 28, 1910 (Died)
	Henry Billings Brown	Associate Justice	Michigan	Samuel Freeman Miller	December 29, 1890 (Acclamation)	January 5, 1891 – May 28, 1906 (Retired)
	George Shiras Jr.	Associate Justice	Pennsylvania	Joseph P. Bradley	July 26, 1892 (Acclamation)	October 10, 1892 – February 23, 1903 (Retired)
	Howell Edmunds Jackson	Associate Justice	Tennessee	Lucius Quintus Cincinnatus Lamar	February 18, 1893 (Acclamation)	March 4, 1893 – August 8, 1895 (Died)

== Citation style ==
Under the Judiciary Act of 1789 the federal court structure at the time comprised District Courts, which had general trial jurisdiction; Circuit Courts, which had mixed trial and appellate (from the US District Courts) jurisdiction; and the United States Supreme Court, which had appellate jurisdiction over the federal District and Circuit courts—and for certain issues over state courts. The Supreme Court also had limited original jurisdiction (i.e., in which cases could be filed directly with the Supreme Court without first having been heard by a lower federal or state court). There were one or more federal District Courts and/or Circuit Courts in each state, territory, or other geographical region.

The Judiciary Act of 1891 created the United States Courts of Appeals and reassigned the jurisdiction of most routine appeals from the district and circuit courts to these appellate courts. The Act created nine new courts that were originally known as the "United States Circuit Courts of Appeals." The new courts had jurisdiction over most appeals of lower court decisions. The Supreme Court could review either legal issues that a court of appeals certified or decisions of court of appeals by writ of certiorari.

Bluebook citation style is used for case names, citations, and jurisdictions.

- "# Cir." = United States Court of Appeals
  - e.g., "3d Cir." = United States Court of Appeals for the Third Circuit
- "C.C.D." = United States Circuit Court for the District of . . .
  - e.g.,"C.C.D.N.J." = United States Circuit Court for the District of New Jersey
- "D." = United States District Court for the District of . . .
  - e.g.,"D. Mass." = United States District Court for the District of Massachusetts
- "E." = Eastern; "M." = Middle; "N." = Northern; "S." = Southern; "W." = Western
  - e.g.,"C.C.S.D.N.Y." = United States Circuit Court for the Southern District of New York
  - e.g.,"M.D. Ala." = United States District Court for the Middle District of Alabama
- "Ct. Cl." = United States Court of Claims
- The abbreviation of a state's name alone indicates the highest appellate court in that state's judiciary at the time.
  - e.g.,"Pa." = Supreme Court of Pennsylvania
  - e.g.,"Me." = Supreme Judicial Court of Maine

== List of cases in volume 151 U.S. ==
Case Name	Page & year	Opinion of the Court	Concurring opinion(s)	Dissenting opinion(s)	Lower Court	Disposition
Angle v. Chicago et al. Ry. Co.	1 (1894)	Brewer	none	none	C.C.W.D. Wis.	reversed
Smith v. United States	50 (1894)	Brown	none	none	C.C.W.D. Ark.	reversed
Wilson v. Oswego Twp.	56 (1894)	Jackson	none	none	C.C.E.D. Mo.	reversed
Inglehart v. Stansbury	68 (1894)	Gray	none	none	Sup. Ct. D.C.	dismissed
Texas & P. Ry. Co. v. Volk	73 (1894)	Gray	none	none	C.C.N.D. Tex.	affirmed
Aztec M. Co. v. Ripley	79 (1894)	Fuller	none	none	8th Cir.	affirmed
Texas & P. Ry. Co. v. Johnson	81 (1894)	Fuller	none	none	Tex.	affirmed
Texas & P. Ry. Co. v. Saunders	105 (1894)	Fuller	none	none	C.C.E.D. Tex.	dismissed
Texas & P. Ry. Co. v. Horn	110 (1894)	Fuller	none	none	C.C.E.D. Tex.	dismissed
Hardenbergh v. Ray	112 (1894)	Jackson	none	none	C.C.D. Or.	affirmed
Central T. Co. v. McGeorge	129 (1894)	Shiras	none	none	C.C.W.D. Va.	reversed
Vorhees v. Noye Mfg. Co.	135 (1894)	Fuller	none	none	C.C.D. Neb.	dismissed
Baltimore T. Co. v. Baltimore B.R.R. Co.	137 (1894)	Fuller	none	none	Balt. City Ct.	dismissed
Keystone Mfg. Co. v. Adams	139 (1894)	Shiras	none	none	C.C.N.D. Ill.	reversed
Bates v. Preble	149 (1894)	Brown	none	none	C.C.D. Mass.	reversed
Tucker v. United States	164 (1894)	Gray	none	none	C.C.W.D. Ark.	affirmed
Cadwalader v. Zeh	171 (1894)	Gray	none	none	C.C.E.D. Pa.	affirmed
Southworth v. United States	179 (1894)	Brewer	none	none	Ct. Cl.	reversed
Miller v. Eagle Mfg. Co.	186 (1894)	Jackson	none	none	C.C.S.D. Iowa	reversed
Chicago et al. Ry. Co. v. Lowell	209 (1894)	Brown	Gray; Shiras	none	C.C.D. Minn.	affirmed
Wollensak v. Sargent	221 (1894)	Fuller	none	none	C.C.D. Conn.	affirmed
Halliday v. Stuart	229 (1894)	Harlan	none	none	C.C.E.D. Ark.	reversed
Iowa v. Illinois	238 (1894)	Fuller	none	none	original	order vacated
In re Bonner	242 (1894)	Field	none	none	U.S. Ct. Indian Terr.	habeas corpus granted
Davis v. Utah	262 (1894)	Harlan	none	none	Sup. Ct. Terr. Utah	affirmed
Gottlieb v. Thatcher	271 (1894)	Jackson	none	none	C.C.D. Colo.	affirmed
Haughey v. Lee	282 (1894)	Shiras	none	none	C.C.E.D. Pa.	affirmed
Sheffield et al. Co. v. Gordon	285 (1894)	Brown	none	none	C.C.N.D. Ala.	affirmed
Ft. Worth C. Co. v. Smith B. Co.	294 (1894)	Fuller	none	none	C.C.N.D. Tex.	affirmed
Hickory v. United States	303 (1894)	Fuller	none	none	C.C.W.D. Ark.	reversed
Crescent M. Co. v. Wasatch M. Co.	317 (1894)	Shiras	none	none	Sup. Ct. Terr. Utah	affirmed
Maynard v. Hecht	324 (1894)	Fuller	none	none	C.C.D. Neb.	dismissed
Moran v. Hagerman	329 (1894)	Fuller	none	none	C.C.D. Nev.	dismissed
Meddaugh v. Wilson	333 (1894)	Brewer	none	none	Sup. Ct. D.C.	reversed
Werner v. City of Charleston	360 (1894)	Fuller	none	none	S.C.	dismissed
United States v. Alger	362 (1894)	Gray	none	none	Ct. Cl.	reversed
United States v. Stahl	366 (1894)	Gray	none	none	Ct. Cl.	reversed
Merchants' C.P.S. Co. v. Insurance Co. N. Am.	368 (1894)	Jackson	none	none	Tenn.	affirmed
California P. Works v. Davis	389 (1894)	Fuller	none	none	Cal.	dismissed
Pointer v. United States	396 (1894)	Harlan	none	none	C.C.W.D. Ark.	affirmed
Garner v. Second Nat'l Bank	420 (1894)	Harlan	none	none	C.C.D.R.I.	reversed
City of Lincoln v. Power	436 (1894)	Shiras	none	none	C.C.D. Neb.	affirmed
Chapman v. Handley	443 (1894)	Fuller	none	none	Sup. Ct. Terr. Utah	dismissed
Mammoth M. Co. v. Salt Lake F.M. Co.	447 (1894)	Fuller	none	none	Sup. Ct. Terr. Utah	affirmed
Imperial F. Ins. Co. v. Coos Cnty.	452 (1894)	Jackson	none	none	C.C.D.N.H.	reversed
Columbus S. Ry. Co. v. Wright	470 (1894)	Jackson	none	none	Ga.	affirmed
De Arnaud v. United States	483 (1894)	Shiras	none	none	Ct. Cl.	affirmed
Galveston et al. Ry. Co. v. Gonzales	496 (1894)	Brown	none	Jackson	C.C.W.D. Tex.	reversed
Hedden v. Robertson	520 (1894)	Jackson	none	none	C.C.S.D.N.Y.	reversed
Newport L. Co. v. City of Newport	527 (1894)	Jackson	none	none	Ky.	dismissed
United States v. Hutchins	542 (1894)	Brown	none	none	Ct. Cl.	affirmed
Lewis v. Monson	545 (1894)	Brewer	none	none	C.C.S.D. Miss.	affirmed
Lewis v. Wilson	551 (1894)	Brewer	none	none	C.C.N.D. Fla.	affirmed
New York et al. R.R. Co. v. Town of Bristol	556 (1894)	Fuller	none	none	Conn.	affirmed
United States v. La Tourrette	572 (1894)	Gray	none	none	Ct. Cl.	affirmed
United States v. Thomas	577 (1894)	Field	none	none	C.C.W.D. Wis.	certification
Maxwell L.G. Co. v. Dawson	586 (1894)	Brown	none	none	Sup. Ct. Terr. N.M.	reversed
Shauer v. Alterton	607 (1894)	Harlan	none	none	S.D.	affirmed
Buckstaff v. Russell Co.	626 (1894)	Harlan	none	none	C.C.D. Neb.	reversed
Bryan v. Board of Educ.	639 (1894)	Harlan	none	none	Ky.	affirmed
Dower v. Richards	658 (1894)	Gray	none	none	Cal.	affirmed
Martin's Adm'r v. Baltimore & O.R.R. Co.	673 (1894)	Gray	none	Harlan	C.C.D.W. Va.	dismissed
