= List of United States Supreme Court cases, volume 145 =

Supreme Court of the United States
- Interactive map of Supreme Court of the United States
- 38°53′26″N 77°00′16″W
- Established: March 4, 1789; 236 years ago<
- Location: Washington, D.C.
- Coordinates: 38°53′26″N 77°00′16″W
- Composition method: Presidential nomination with Senate confirmation
- Authorised by: Constitution of the United States, Art. III, § 1
- Judge term length: life tenure, subject to impeachment and removal
- Number of positions: 9 (by statute)
- Website: supremecourt.gov

This is a list of cases reported in volume 145 of United States Reports, decided by the Supreme Court of the United States in 1892.

== Justices of the Supreme Court at the time of volume 145 U.S. ==
The Supreme Court is established by Article III, Section 1 of the Constitution of the United States, which says: "The judicial Power of the United States, shall be vested in one supreme Court . . .". The size of the Court is not specified; the Constitution leaves it to Congress to set the number of justices. Under the Judiciary Act of 1789 Congress originally fixed the number of justices at six (one chief justice and five associate justices). Since 1789 Congress has varied the size of the Court from six to seven, nine, ten, and back to nine justices (always including one chief justice).

When the cases in volume 145 U.S. were decided the Court comprised the following eight members (Justice Joseph P. Bradley had died in January 1892):

Portrait	Justice	Office	Home State	Succeeded	Date confirmed by the Senate (Vote)	Tenure on Supreme Court
	Melville Fuller	Chief Justice	Illinois	Morrison Waite	July 20, 1888 (41–20)	October 8, 1888 – July 4, 1910 (Died)
	Stephen Johnson Field	Associate Justice	California	newly created seat	March 10, 1863 (Acclamation)	May 10, 1863 – December 1, 1897 (Retired)
	John Marshall Harlan	Associate Justice	Kentucky	David Davis	November 29, 1877 (Acclamation)	December 10, 1877 – October 14, 1911 (Died)
	Horace Gray	Associate Justice	Massachusetts	Nathan Clifford	December 20, 1881 (51–5)	January 9, 1882 – September 15, 1902 (Died)
	Samuel Blatchford	Associate Justice	New York	Ward Hunt	March 22, 1882 (Acclamation)	April 3, 1882 – July 7, 1893 (Died)
	Lucius Quintus Cincinnatus Lamar	Associate Justice	Mississippi	William Burnham Woods	January 16, 1888 (32–28)	January 18, 1888 – January 23, 1893 (Died)
	David Josiah Brewer	Associate Justice	Kansas	Stanley Matthews	December 18, 1889 (53–11)	January 6, 1890 – March 28, 1910 (Died)
	Henry Billings Brown	Associate Justice	Michigan	Samuel Freeman Miller	December 29, 1890 (Acclamation)	January 5, 1891 – May 28, 1906 (Retired)

== Citation style ==
Under the Judiciary Act of 1789 the federal court structure at the time comprised District Courts, which had general trial jurisdiction; Circuit Courts, which had mixed trial and appellate (from the US District Courts) jurisdiction; and the United States Supreme Court, which had appellate jurisdiction over the federal District and Circuit courts—and for certain issues over state courts. The Supreme Court also had limited original jurisdiction (i.e., in which cases could be filed directly with the Supreme Court without first having been heard by a lower federal or state court). There were one or more federal District Courts and/or Circuit Courts in each state, territory, or other geographical region.

The Judiciary Act of 1891 created the United States Courts of Appeals and reassigned the jurisdiction of most routine appeals from the district and circuit courts to these appellate courts. The Act created nine new courts that were originally known as the "United States Circuit Courts of Appeals." The new courts had jurisdiction over most appeals of lower court decisions. The Supreme Court could review either legal issues that a court of appeals certified or decisions of court of appeals by writ of certiorari.

Bluebook citation style is used for case names, citations, and jurisdictions.

- "# Cir." = United States Court of Appeals
  - e.g., "3d Cir." = United States Court of Appeals for the Third Circuit
- "C.C.D." = United States Circuit Court for the District of . . .
  - e.g.,"C.C.D.N.J." = United States Circuit Court for the District of New Jersey
- "D." = United States District Court for the District of . . .
  - e.g.,"D. Mass." = United States District Court for the District of Massachusetts
- "E." = Eastern; "M." = Middle; "N." = Northern; "S." = Southern; "W." = Western
  - e.g.,"C.C.S.D.N.Y." = United States Circuit Court for the Southern District of New York
  - e.g.,"M.D. Ala." = United States District Court for the Middle District of Alabama
- "Ct. Cl." = United States Court of Claims
- The abbreviation of a state's name alone indicates the highest appellate court in that state's judiciary at the time.
  - e.g.,"Pa." = Supreme Court of Pennsylvania
  - e.g.,"Me." = Supreme Judicial Court of Maine

== List of cases in volume 145 U.S. ==
Case Name	Page and year	Opinion of the Court	Concurring opinion(s)	Dissenting opinion(s)	Lower Court	Disposition
Ficklen v. Shelby County	1 (1892)	Fuller	none	Harlan	Tenn.	affirmed
Sessions v. Romadka	29 (1892)	Brown	none	none	C.C.E.D. Wis.	reversed
Oregon Railway and Navigation Company v. Oregonian Railway Company	52 (1892)	Fuller	none	none	C.C.D. Or.	reversed
Lewis v. Barnhart	56 (1892)	Harlan	none	none	C.C.N.D. Ill.	affirmed
Quincy, Missouri and Pacific Railroad Company v. Humphreys	82 (1892)	Fuller	none	none	C.C.E.D. Mo.	affirmed
St. Joseph and St. Louis Railroad Company v. Humphreys	105 (1892)	Fuller	none	none	C.C.E.D. Mo.	affirmed
Willard v. Willard	116 (1892)	Gray	none	none	Sup. Ct. D.C.	affirmed
New England Mortgage Security Company v. Gay	123 (1892)	Brown	none	none	C.C.S.D. Ga.	dismissed
Furrer v. Ferris	132 (1892)	Brewer	none	none	C.C.N.D. Ohio	affirmed
Barnett v. City of Denison	135 (1892)	Brown	none	none	C.C.E.D. Tex.	affirmed
Goode v. Gaines	141 (1892)	Fuller	none	none	C.C.E.D. Ark.	reversed
Topliff v. Topliff	156 (1892)	Brown	none	none	C.C.N.D. Ohio	affirmed
People ex rel. New York Electric Lines Company v. Squire	175 (1892)	Lamar	none	none	N.Y. Ct. Com. Pl.	affirmed
Lehigh Valley Railroad Company v. Pennsylvania	192 (1892)	Fuller	none	none	Pa.	affirmed
Culver v. Wilkinson	205 (1892)	Blatchford	none	none	C.C.S.D.N.Y.	affirmed
Washington v. Opie	214 (1892)	Harlan	none	none	D.W. Va.	reversed
City of Clay Center v. Farmers' Loan and Trust Company	224 (1892)	Fuller	none	none	C.C.D. Kan.	dismissed
Freeman v. Asmus	226 (1892)	Blatchford	none	none	C.C.E.D. Pa.	reversed
Ryan v. Hard	241 (1892)	Blatchford	none	none	C.C.N.D.N.Y.	affirmed
Earnshaw v. Cadwalader	247 (1892)	Blatchford	none	none	C.C.E.D. Pa.	affirmed
Interstate Commerce Commission v. Baltimore and Ohio Railroad Company	263 (1892)	Brown	none	none	C.C.S.D. Ohio	affirmed
Mutual Life Insurance Company v. Hillmon	285 (1892)	Gray	none	none	C.C.D. Kan.	reversed
South Spring Hill Gold Mining Company v. Amador Medean Gold Mining Company	300 (1892)	Fuller	none	none	C.C.N.D. Cal.	reversed
Hoyt v. Horne	302 (1892)	Brown	none	none	C.C.D. Mass.	reversed
Pickering v. Lomax	310 (1892)	Brown	none	none	Ill.	reversed
Felix v. Patrick	317 (1892)	Brown	none	none	C.C.D. Neb.	affirmed
The Corsair	335 (1892)	Brown	none	none	C.C.E.D. La.	affirmed
Pewabic Mining Company v. Marcus	349 (1892)	Brewer	none	none	C.C.W.D. Mich.	affirmed
Galliher v. Cadwell	368 (1892)	Brewer	none	none	Sup. Ct. Terr. Wash.	affirmed
Cox v. Hart	376 (1892)	Harlan	none	none	C.C.N.D. Tex.	affirmed
St. Louis, Vandalia and Terre Haute Railroad Company v. Terre Haute and Indianapolis Railroad Company	393 (1892)	Gray	none	none	C.C.S.D. Ill.	affirmed
Hancock v. Louisville and Nashville Railroad Company	409 (1892)	Brewer	none	none	C.C.D. Ky.	affirmed
Aerkfetz v. Humphreys	418 (1892)	Brewer	none	none	C.C.E.D. Mich.	affirmed
Miller v. Ammon	421 (1892)	Brewer	none	none	C.C.S.D. Iowa	reversed
Benson Mining and Smelting Company v. Alta Mining and Smelting Company	428 (1892)	Brewer	none	none	Sup. Ct. Terr. Ariz.	affirmed
Kissam v. Anderson	435 (1892)	Brewer	none	none	C.C.S.D.N.Y.	reversed
Shaw v. Quincy Mining Company	444 (1892)	Gray	none	none	C.C.S.D.N.Y.	mandamus denied
Brown v. Smart	454 (1892)	Gray	none	none	Md.	affirmed
Franklin Telegraph Company v. Harrison	459 (1892)	Harlan	none	Fuller	C.C.E.D. Pa.	affirmed
Matthews v. Warner	475 (1892)	Harlan	none	none	C.C.D. Mass.	affirmed
Baker's Executors v. Kilgore	487 (1892)	Harlan	none	none	Tenn.	affirmed
McDonald v. Belding	492 (1892)	Harlan	none	none	C.C.E.D. Ark.	reversed
Glenn v. Marbury	499 (1892)	Harlan	none	none	Sup. Ct. D.C.	affirmed
Dowling v. National Exchange Bank of Boston	512 (1892)	Harlan	none	none	C.C.W.D. Mich.	reversed
Nebraska v. Iowa	519 (1892)	per curiam	none	none	original	boundary set
Telfener v. Russ	522 (1892)	Field	none	none	C.C.W.D. Tex.	reversed
Bardon v. Northern Pacific Railroad Company	535 (1892)	Field	none	none	C.C.W.D. Wis.	reversed
Jenkins v. Collard	546 (1892)	Field	none	none	C.C.S.D. Ohio	affirmed
Rossman v. Hedden	561 (1892)	Fuller	none	none	C.C.S.D.N.Y.	affirmed
Cross v. United States	571 (1892)	Fuller	none	none	Sup. Ct. D.C.	dismissed
Oteri v. Scalzo	578 (1892)	Fuller	none	none	C.C.E.D. La.	reversed
Texas and Pacific Railway Company v. Cox	593 (1892)	Fuller	none	none	C.C.E.D. Tex.	affirmed
Meagher v. Minnesota Thresher Manufacturing Company	608 (1892)	Fuller	none	none	Minn.	dismissed
Meehan v. Valentine	611 (1892)	Gray	none	none	C.C.E.D. Pa.	affirmed
