= List of United States Supreme Court cases, volume 150 =

Supreme Court of the United States
- Interactive map of Supreme Court of the United States
- 38°53′26″N 77°00′16″W
- Established: March 4, 1789; 236 years ago
- Location: Washington, D.C.
- Coordinates: 38°53′26″N 77°00′16″W
- Composition method: Presidential nomination with Senate confirmation
- Authorised by: Constitution of the United States, Art. III, § 1
- Judge term length: life tenure, subject to impeachment and removal
- Number of positions: 9 (by statute)
- Website: supremecourt.gov

This is a list of cases reported in volume 150 of United States Reports, decided by the Supreme Court of the United States in 1893.

== Justices of the Supreme Court at the time of volume 150 U.S. ==
The Supreme Court is established by Article III, Section 1 of the Constitution of the United States, which says: "The judicial Power of the United States, shall be vested in one supreme Court . . .". The size of the Court is not specified; the Constitution leaves it to Congress to set the number of justices. Under the Judiciary Act of 1789 Congress originally fixed the number of justices at six (one chief justice and five associate justices). Since 1789 Congress has varied the size of the Court from six to seven, nine, ten, and back to nine justices (always including one chief justice).

When the cases in volume 150 U.S. were decided the Court comprised the following eight members, after the death of Justice Samuel Blatchford in July 1893:

Portrait	Justice	Office	Home State	Succeeded	Date confirmed by the Senate (Vote)	Tenure on Supreme Court
	Melville Fuller	Chief Justice	Illinois	Morrison Waite	July 20, 1888 (41–20)	October 8, 1888 – July 4, 1910 (Died)
	Stephen Johnson Field	Associate Justice	California	newly created seat	March 10, 1863 (Acclamation)	May 10, 1863 – December 1, 1897 (Retired)
	John Marshall Harlan	Associate Justice	Kentucky	David Davis	November 29, 1877 (Acclamation)	December 10, 1877 – October 14, 1911 (Died)
	Horace Gray	Associate Justice	Massachusetts	Nathan Clifford	December 20, 1881 (51–5)	January 9, 1882 – September 15, 1902 (Died)
	David Josiah Brewer	Associate Justice	Kansas	Stanley Matthews	December 18, 1889 (53–11)	January 6, 1890 – March 28, 1910 (Died)
	Henry Billings Brown	Associate Justice	Michigan	Samuel Freeman Miller	December 29, 1890 (Acclamation)	January 5, 1891 – May 28, 1906 (Retired)
	George Shiras Jr.	Associate Justice	Pennsylvania	Joseph P. Bradley	July 26, 1892 (Acclamation)	October 10, 1892 – February 23, 1903 (Retired)
	Howell Edmunds Jackson	Associate Justice	Tennessee	Lucius Quintus Cincinnatus Lamar	February 18, 1893 (Acclamation)	March 4, 1893 – August 8, 1895 (Died)

== Citation style ==
Under the Judiciary Act of 1789 the federal court structure at the time comprised District Courts, which had general trial jurisdiction; Circuit Courts, which had mixed trial and appellate (from the US District Courts) jurisdiction; and the United States Supreme Court, which had appellate jurisdiction over the federal District and Circuit courts—and for certain issues over state courts. The Supreme Court also had limited original jurisdiction (i.e., in which cases could be filed directly with the Supreme Court without first having been heard by a lower federal or state court). There were one or more federal District Courts and/or Circuit Courts in each state, territory, or other geographical region.

The Judiciary Act of 1891 created the United States Courts of Appeals and reassigned the jurisdiction of most routine appeals from the district and circuit courts to these appellate courts. The Act created nine new courts that were originally known as the "United States Circuit Courts of Appeals." The new courts had jurisdiction over most appeals of lower court decisions. The Supreme Court could review either legal issues that a court of appeals certified or decisions of court of appeals by writ of certiorari.

Bluebook citation style is used for case names, citations, and jurisdictions.

- "# Cir." = United States Court of Appeals
  - e.g., "3d Cir." = United States Court of Appeals for the Third Circuit
- "C.C.D." = United States Circuit Court for the District of . . .
  - e.g.,"C.C.D.N.J." = United States Circuit Court for the District of New Jersey
- "D." = United States District Court for the District of . . .
  - e.g.,"D. Mass." = United States District Court for the District of Massachusetts
- "E." = Eastern; "M." = Middle; "N." = Northern; "S." = Southern; "W." = Western
  - e.g.,"C.C.S.D.N.Y." = United States Circuit Court for the Southern District of New York
  - e.g.,"M.D. Ala." = United States District Court for the Middle District of Alabama
- "Ct. Cl." = United States Court of Claims
- The abbreviation of a state's name alone indicates the highest appellate court in that state's judiciary at the time.
  - e.g.,"Pa." = Supreme Court of Pennsylvania
  - e.g.,"Me." = Supreme Judicial Court of Maine

== List of cases in volume 150 U.S. ==
Case Name	Page and year	Opinion of the Court	Concurring opinion(s)	Dissenting opinion(s)	Lower Court	Disposition
United States v. Denver and Rio Grande Railway Company I	1 (1893)	Jackson	none	none	C.C.D. Colo.	affirmed
United States v. Denver and Rio Grande Railway Company II	16 (1893)	Jackson	none	none	C.C.D. Colo.	affirmed
Wood v. Brady	18 (1893)	Brown	none	none	Cal.	dismissed
New York and Texas Land Company v. Votaw	24 (1893)	Shiras	none	none	C.C.W.D. Tex.	affirmed
Aspen Mining and Smelting Company v. Billings	31 (1893)	Fuller	none	none	C.C.D. Colo.	dismissed
Corbin Cabinet Lock Company v. Eagle Lock Company	38 (1893)	Jackson	none	none	C.C.D. Conn.	affirmed
Gordon v. Warder	47 (1893)	Shiras	none	none	C.C.S.D. Ohio	affirmed
United States v. Baird	54 (1893)	Brown	none	none	Ct. Cl.	reversed
Moore v. United States	57 (1893)	Brown	none	none	C.C.E.D. Tex.	affirmed
Collins v. United States	62 (1893)	Brewer	none	none	C.C.W.D. Ark.	affirmed
United States v. Patterson	65 (1893)	Brewer	none	none	Ct. Cl.	reversed
Magone v. Heller	70 (1893)	Gray	none	none	C.C.S.D.N.Y.	reversed
Hall v. United States	76 (1893)	Gray	none	none	C.C.W.D. Ark.	reversed
Bushnell v. Crooke Mining and Smelting Company	82 (1893)	Fuller	none	none	Colo.	rehearing denied
Wells v. Goodnow's Administrator	84 (1893)	Fuller	none	none	Iowa	dismissed
Schuyler National Bank v. Bollong I	85 (1893)	Fuller	none	none	Neb.	dismissed
Schuyler National Bank v. Bollong II	90 (1893)	Fuller	none	none	Neb.	dismissed
Holder v. United States	91 (1893)	Fuller	none	none	C.C.W.D. Ark.	affirmed
Brown v. United States	93 (1893)	Jackson	none	none	C.C.W.D. Ark.	reversed
Wager v. Providence Insurance Company	99 (1893)	Shiras	none	none	C.C.N.D.N.Y.	affirmed
Ball and Socket Fastener Company v. Kraetzer	111 (1893)	Brown	none	none	C.C.D. Mass.	affirmed
Graves v. United States	118 (1893)	Brown	none	Brewer	C.C.W.D. Ark.	reversed
Rader's Administrator v. Maddox	128 (1893)	Brewer	none	none	Sup. Ct. Terr. Mont.	reversed
Miller's Executors v. Swann	132 (1893)	Brewer	none	none	Ala.	dismissed
Colorado Central Consolidated Mining Company v. Turck	138 (1893)	Fuller	none	none	8th Cir.	dismissed
United States v. The Late Corporation of the Church of Jesus Christ of Latter-Day Saints	145 (1893)	Fuller	none	none	Sup. Ct. Terr. Utah	reversed
In re Parsons	150 (1893)	Fuller	none	none	C.C.N.D. Ala.	mandamus denied
Morse v. Anderson	156 (1893)	Fuller	none	none	C.C.D. Ky.	affirmed
Empire Coal and Transportation Company v. Empire Coal and Mining Company	159 (1893)	Gray	none	none	C.C.M.D. Tenn.	affirmed
Howard v. Detroit Stove Works	164 (1893)	Jackson	none	none	C.C.E.D. Mich.	affirmed
Carey v. Houston and Texas Central Railway Company	170 (1893)	Fuller	none	none	C.C.E.D. Tex.	dismissed
Hedges v. Dixon County	182 (1893)	Jackson	none	none	C.C.D. Neb.	affirmed
Lane and Bodley Company v. Locke	193 (1893)	Shiras	none	none	C.C.S.D. Ohio	reversed
Mississippi Mills v. Cohn	202 (1893)	Brewer	none	none	C.C.W.D. La.	reversed
McDaid v. Oklahoma ex rel. Smith	209 (1893)	Fuller	none	none	Sup. Ct. Terr. Okla.	reversed
Knapp v. Morss	221 (1893)	Jackson	none	Brown	C.C.D. Conn.	reversed
Thompson v. Sioux Falls National Bank	231 (1893)	Brown	none	none	Sup. Ct. Terr. Dakota	reversed
Elliott v. Chicago, Milwaukee and St. Paul Railway Company	245 (1893)	Brewer	none	none	Sup. Ct. Terr. Dakota	affirmed
United States v. Rodgers	249 (1893)	Field	none	Gray, Brown	6th Cir.	certification
United States Trust Company v. Wabash Western Railway Company	287 (1893)	Brown	none	none	C.C.E.D. Mo.	affirmed
Seney v. Wabash Western Railway Company	310 (1893)	Brown	none	none	C.C.E.D. Mo.	affirmed
Sturm v. Boker	312 (1893)	Jackson	none	none	C.C.D. Ind.	reversed
Gibson v. Peters	342 (1893)	Harlan	none	none	C.C.E.D. Va.	affirmed
Gardner v. Michigan Central Railroad Company	349 (1893)	Fuller	none	none	C.C.W.D. Mich.	reversed
Eustis v. Bolles	361 (1893)	Shiras	none	none	Mass.	dismissed
Hollins v. Brierfield Coal and Iron Company	371 (1893)	Brewer	none	none	C.C.M.D. Ala.	dismissed
Magin v. Karle	387 (1893)	Jackson	none	none	C.C.N.D.N.Y.	affirmed
In re Lennon	393 (1893)	Fuller	none	none	C.C.N.D. Ohio	dismissed
Root v. Woolworth	401 (1893)	Jackson	none	none	C.C.D. Neb.	affirmed
Jacobs v. George	415 (1893)	Fuller	none	none	Sup. Ct. Terr. Ariz.	dismissed
Saltonstall, Collector of Customs v. Birtwell	417 (1893)	Fuller	none	none	C.C.D. Mass.	reversed
Seeberger v. Hardy	420 (1893)	Brown	none	none	C.C.N.D. Ill.	affirmed
McAleer v. United States	424 (1893)	Fuller	none	none	Ct. Cl.	affirmed
Powell v. Brunswick County	433 (1893)	Fuller	none	none	Va.	dismissed
Hicks v. United States	442 (1893)	Shiras	none	Brewer	C.C.W.D. Ark.	reversed
Columbia Mill Company v. Alcorn	460 (1893)	Jackson	none	none	C.C.E.D. Pa.	affirmed
Geographical names and previously appropriated words cannot be appropriated as an exclusive trademark.
Connecticut Mutual Life Insurance Company v. Akens	468 (1893)	Gray	none	none	C.C.W.D. Pa.	affirmed
Lees v. United States	476 (1893)	Brewer	none	none	C.C.E.D. Pa.	reversed
Kinkead v. United States	483 (1893)	Brown	none	Shiras	Ct. Cl.	affirmed
Insley v. United States	512 (1893)	Brown	none	none	8th Cir.	affirmed
Ide v. United States	517 (1893)	Fuller	none	none	Ct. Cl.	affirmed
Long v. Thayer	520 (1893)	Brown	none	none	C.C.W.D. Mo.	affirmed
Latta v. Kilbourn	524 (1893)	Jackson	none	none	Sup. Ct. D.C.	reversed
Allen v. United States	551 (1893)	Fuller	none	Brewer	C.C.W.D. Ark.	reversed
Mullett's Administratrix v. United States	566 (1893)	Brewer	none	none	Ct. Cl.	affirmed
Farley v. Hill	572 (1893)	Shiras	none	none	C.C.D. Minn.	affirmed
Turner v. Sawyer	578 (1893)	Brown	none	none	C.C.D. Colo.	affirmed
Belknap v. United States	588 (1893)	Brewer	none	none	Ct. Cl.	affirmed
Ward v. Cochran	597 (1893)	Shiras	none	none	C.C.D. Neb.	reversed
Horn v. Detroit Dry-Dock Company	610 (1893)	Jackson	none	none	C.C.E.D. Mich.	affirmed
Giles v. Heysinger	627 (1893)	Brown	none	none	C.C.S.D.N.Y.	reversed
Hammond v. Connecticut Mutual Life Insurance Company	633 (1893)	Fuller	none	none	Mo.	dismissed
In re Swan	637 (1893)	Fuller	none	none	C.C.D.S.C.	habeas corpus denied
In re Hohorst	653 (1893)	Gray	none	none	C.C.S.D.N.Y.	mandamus granted
Lehigh Zinc and Iron Company, Ltd. v. Bamford	665 (1893)	Harlan	none	none	C.C.S.D.N.Y.	affirmed
Belden v. Chase	674 (1893)	Fuller	Brown	none	N.Y.	reversed
