= List of United States Supreme Court cases, volume 152 =

Supreme Court of the United States
- Interactive map of Supreme Court of the United States
- 38°53′26″N 77°00′16″W
- Established: March 4, 1789; 236 years ago
- Location: Washington, D.C.
- Coordinates: 38°53′26″N 77°00′16″W
- Composition method: Presidential nomination with Senate confirmation
- Authorised by: Constitution of the United States, Art. III, § 1
- Judge term length: life tenure, subject to impeachment and removal
- Number of positions: 9 (by statute)
- Website: supremecourt.gov

This is a list of cases reported in volume 152 of United States Reports, decided by the Supreme Court of the United States in 1894.

== Justices of the Supreme Court at the time of volume 152 U.S. ==
The Supreme Court is established by Article III, Section 1 of the Constitution of the United States, which says: "The judicial Power of the United States, shall be vested in one supreme Court . . .". The size of the Court is not specified; the Constitution leaves it to Congress to set the number of justices. Under the Judiciary Act of 1789 Congress originally fixed the number of justices at six (one chief justice and five associate justices). Since 1789 Congress has varied the size of the Court from six to seven, nine, ten, and back to nine justices (always including one chief justice).

When the cases in volume 152 U.S. were decided the Court comprised the following nine members (with Edward Douglass White joining the Court on March 12, 1894):

Portrait	Justice	Office	Home State	Succeeded	Date confirmed by the Senate (Vote)	Tenure on Supreme Court
	Melville Fuller	Chief Justice	Illinois	Morrison Waite	July 20, 1888 (41–20)	October 8, 1888 – July 4, 1910 (Died)
	Stephen Johnson Field	Associate Justice	California	newly created seat	March 10, 1863 (Acclamation)	May 10, 1863 – December 1, 1897 (Retired)
	John Marshall Harlan	Associate Justice	Kentucky	David Davis	November 29, 1877 (Acclamation)	December 10, 1877 – October 14, 1911 (Died)
	Horace Gray	Associate Justice	Massachusetts	Nathan Clifford	December 20, 1881 (51–5)	January 9, 1882 – September 15, 1902 (Died)
	David Josiah Brewer	Associate Justice	Kansas	Stanley Matthews	December 18, 1889 (53–11)	January 6, 1890 – March 28, 1910 (Died)
	Henry Billings Brown	Associate Justice	Michigan	Samuel Freeman Miller	December 29, 1890 (Acclamation)	January 5, 1891 – May 28, 1906 (Retired)
	George Shiras Jr.	Associate Justice	Pennsylvania	Joseph P. Bradley	July 26, 1892 (Acclamation)	October 10, 1892 – February 23, 1903 (Retired)
	Howell Edmunds Jackson	Associate Justice	Tennessee	Lucius Quintus Cincinnatus Lamar	February 18, 1893 (Acclamation)	March 4, 1893 – August 8, 1895 (Died)
	Edward Douglass White	Associate Justice	Louisiana	Samuel Blatchford	February 19, 1894 (Acclamation)	March 12, 1894 – December 18, 1910 (Continued as chief justice)

== Citation style ==
Under the Judiciary Act of 1789 the federal court structure at the time comprised District Courts, which had general trial jurisdiction; Circuit Courts, which had mixed trial and appellate (from the US District Courts) jurisdiction; and the United States Supreme Court, which had appellate jurisdiction over the federal District and Circuit courts—and for certain issues over state courts. The Supreme Court also had limited original jurisdiction (i.e., in which cases could be filed directly with the Supreme Court without first having been heard by a lower federal or state court). There were one or more federal District Courts and/or Circuit Courts in each state, territory, or other geographical region.

The Judiciary Act of 1891 created the United States Courts of Appeals and reassigned the jurisdiction of most routine appeals from the district and circuit courts to these appellate courts. The Act created nine new courts that were originally known as the "United States Circuit Courts of Appeals." The new courts had jurisdiction over most appeals of lower court decisions. The Supreme Court could review either legal issues that a court of appeals certified or decisions of court of appeals by writ of certiorari.

Bluebook citation style is used for case names, citations, and jurisdictions.

- "# Cir." = United States Court of Appeals
  - e.g., "3d Cir." = United States Court of Appeals for the Third Circuit
- "C.C.D." = United States Circuit Court for the District of . . .
  - e.g.,"C.C.D.N.J." = United States Circuit Court for the District of New Jersey
- "D." = United States District Court for the District of . . .
  - e.g.,"D. Mass." = United States District Court for the District of Massachusetts
- "E." = Eastern; "M." = Middle; "N." = Northern; "S." = Southern; "W." = Western
  - e.g.,"C.C.S.D.N.Y." = United States Circuit Court for the Southern District of New York
  - e.g.,"M.D. Ala." = United States District Court for the Middle District of Alabama
- "Ct. Cl." = United States Court of Claims
- The abbreviation of a state's name alone indicates the highest appellate court in that state's judiciary at the time.
  - e.g.,"Pa." = Supreme Court of Pennsylvania
  - e.g.,"Me." = Supreme Judicial Court of Maine

== List of cases in volume 152 U.S. ==
Case Name	Page & year	Opinion of the Court	Concurring opinion(s)	Dissenting opinion(s)	Lower Court	Disposition
Shively v. Bowlby	1 (1894)	Gray	none	none	Or.	affirmed
Prosser v. Northern P.R.R. Co.	59 (1894)	Gray	none	none	C.C.D. Wash.	reversed
Hutchinson I. Co. v. Caldwell	65 (1894)	Fuller	none	none	Kan.	affirmed
Plant I. Co. v. Jacksonville et al. Ry. Co.	71 (1894)	Field	none	none	C.C.N.D. Fla.	reversed
St. Louis & S.F. Ry. Co. v. Schumacher	77 (1894)	Brown	none	none	C.C.W.D. Ark.	reversed
Lazarus v. Phelps	81 (1894)	Brown	none	none	C.C.N.D. Tex.	affirmed
Rowe v. Phelps	87 (1894)	Brown	none	none	C.C.N.D. Tex.	dismissed
Gumaer v. Colorado O. Co.	88 (1894)	Shiras	none	none	C.C.D. Colo.	dismissed
Coleman v. United States	96 (1894)	Shiras	none	none	Ct. Cl.	affirmed
Belding Mfg. Co. v. Challenge C.P. Co.	100 (1894)	Shiras	none	none	C.C.W.D. Mich.	affirmed
Northern P.R.R. Co. v. Everett	107 (1894)	Shiras	none	none	C.C.D.N.D.	affirmed
Missouri et al. Ry Co. v. Roberts	114 (1894)	Field	none	none	Kan.	reversed
The Main	122 (1894)	Brown	none	none	C.C.D. Md.	affirmed
Lawton v. Steele	133 (1894)	Brown	none	none	N.Y. Sup. Ct.	affirmed
Southern P.R.R. Co. v. Seley	145 (1894)	Shiras	none	none	Sup. Ct. Terr. Utah	reversed
El Paso W. Co. v. City of El Paso	157 (1894)	Brewer	none	none	C.C.W.D. Tex.	dismissed
Montana Co. v. St Louis M. & M. Co.	160 (1894)	Brewer	none	none	Mont.	affirmed
Miller v. Courtnay	172 (1894)	Brewer	none	none	C.C.D. Neb.	affirmed
United States v. Shea	178 (1894)	Brewer	none	none	Ct. Cl.	affirmed
Snell v. City of Chicago	191 (1894)	Brewer	none	none	Ill.	dismissed
Cincinnati et al. Co. v. Western S.L. Co.	200 (1894)	Brewer	none	none	C.C.S.D. Ohio	affirmed
Caha v. United States	211 (1894)	Brewer	none	none	D. Kan.	affirmed
King v. Amy & S.M. Co.	222 (1894)	Field	none	none	Mont.	reversed
Louisville et al. R.R. Co. v. Clarke	230 (1894)	Harlan	none	none	C.C.D. Ind.	affirmed
Dunlap v. Schofield	244 (1894)	Gray	none	none	C.C.E.D. Pa.	dismissed
Carne v. Russ	250 (1894)	Gray	none	none	C.C.N.D. Ill.	dismissed
Johnson et al. Co. v. W. Wharton Jr. Co.	252 (1894)	Harlan	none	none	C.C.E.D. Pa.	affirmed
Union P. Ry. Co. v. McDonald	262 (1894)	Harlan	none	none	C.C.D. Colo.	affirmed
United States v. Northern P.R.R. Co.	284 (1894)	Harlan	none	none	C.C.D. Or.	reversed
Keokuk & W.R.R. Co. v. Missouri	301 (1894)	Brown	none	none	Mo.	affirmed
Keokuk & W.R.R. Co. v. Scotland Cnty. I	317 (1894)	Brown	none	none	C.C.E.D. Mo.	affirmed
Keokuk & W.R.R. Co. v. Scotland Cnty. II	318 (1894)	Brown	none	none	C.C.E.D. Mo.	affirmed
Dowell v. Applegate	327 (1894)	Harlan	none	none	Or.	reversed
Western Nat'l Bank v. Armstrong	346 (1894)	Shiras	none	none	C.C.S.D. Ohio	affirmed
Israel v. Arthur	355 (1894)	Fuller	none	none	Colo.	dismissed
Michigan v. Flint & P.M.R.R. Co.	363 (1894)	Fuller	none	none	Mich.	dismissed
Maddock v. Magone	368 (1894)	Fuller	none	none	C.C.S.D.N.Y.	affirmed
Berbecker v. Robertson	373 (1894)	Fuller	none	none	C.C.S.D.N.Y.	affirmed
Duncan v. Missouri	377 (1894)	Fuller	none	none	Mo.	dismissed
United States v. Alger	384 (1894)	Gray	none	none	Ct. Cl.	rehearing denied
Murphy v. Packer	398 (1894)	Shiras	none	none	C.C.W.D. Pa.	affirmed
Corinne et al. Co. v. Toponce	405 (1894)	Brewer	none	none	Sup. Ct. Terr. Utah	affirmed
Halstead v. Grinnan	412 (1894)	Brewer	none	none	C.C.D.W. Va.	affirmed
Morgan E. Co. v. Albany P.W.P. Co.	425 (1894)	Brown	none	none	C.C.N.D.N.Y.	affirmed
United States v. Bashaw	436 (1894)	Fuller	none	none	8th Cir.	reversed
Schlesinger v. Kansas City & S. Ry. Co.	444 (1894)	Harlan	none	none	C.C.W.D. Mo.	affirmed
Tennessee v. Union & P. Bank	454 (1894)	Gray	none	Harlan	C.C.W.D. Tenn.	reversed
McKittrick v. Arkansas C. Ry Co.	473 (1894)	Harlan	none	none	C.C.E.D. Ark.	affirmed
Maclay v. Equitable L.A. Soc'y	499 (1894)	Gray	none	none	C.C.E.D. La.	affirmed
Manuel v. Wulff	505 (1894)	Fuller	none	none	Mont.	reversed
City Nat'l Bank v. Hunter	512 (1894)	Harlan	none	none	C.C.N.D. Tex.	dismissed
Sargent v. Covert	516 (1894)	Fuller	none	none	C.C.S.D.N.Y.	reversed
Herrman v. Robertson	521 (1894)	Fuller	none	none	C.C.S.D.N.Y.	affirmed
Huntley v. Kingman Co.	527 (1894)	Brown	none	none	U.S. Ct. Indian Terr.	reversed
Dealy v. United States	539 (1894)	Brewer	none	none	D.N.D.	affirmed
Hardt v. Heidweyer	547 (1894)	Brewer	none	none	C.C.N.D. Ill.	affirmed
Seabury v. Am Ende	561 (1894)	Shiras	none	none	C.C.S.D.N.Y.	affirmed
Sarlls v. United States	570 (1894)	Shiras	none	none	W.D. Ark.	reversed
Presson v. Russell	577 (1894)	Fuller	none	none	C.C.D. Mass.	reversed
Seeberger v. Schlesinger	581 (1894)	Brown	none	none	C.C.N.D. Ill.	reversed
Davis v. Mercantile T. Co.	590 (1894)	Brewer	none	none	C.C.S.D. Ohio	dismissed
North et al. Co. v. St Louis et al. Co.	596 (1894)	Jackson	none	none	C.C.N.D. Ill.	reversed
Bogle v. Magone	623 (1894)	Gray	none	none	C.C.S.D.N.Y.	reversed
Saltonstall v. Russell	628 (1894)	Gray	none	none	C.C.D. Mass.	reversed
Burck v. Taylor	634 (1894)	Brewer	none	Jackson	C.C.W.D. Tex.	affirmed
Northern P.R.R. Co. v. Booth	671 (1894)	Fuller	none	none	C.C.D. Minn.	dismissed
Robertson v. Chapman	673 (1894)	Harlan	none	none	C.C.D. Neb.	affirmed
Union P. Ry. Co. v. Daniels	684 (1894)	Fuller	none	none	Sup. Ct. Terr. Utah	affirmed
Schoenfeld v. Hendricks	691 (1894)	Fuller	none	none	C.C.S.D.N.Y.	affirmed
Worthington v. City of Boston	695 (1894)	Harlan	none	none	C.C.D. Mass.	reversed
