= List of United States Supreme Court cases, volume 108 =

Supreme Court of the United States
- Interactive map of Supreme Court of the United States
- 38°53′26″N 77°00′16″W
- Established: March 4, 1789; 236 years ago
- Location: Washington, D.C.
- Coordinates: 38°53′26″N 77°00′16″W
- Composition method: Presidential nomination with Senate confirmation
- Authorised by: Constitution of the United States, Art. III, § 1
- Judge term length: life tenure, subject to impeachment and removal
- Number of positions: 9 (by statute)
- Website: supremecourt.gov

This is a list of cases reported in volume 108 of United States Reports, decided by the Supreme Court of the United States in 1882 and 1883.

== Justices of the Supreme Court at the time of volume 108 U.S. ==
The Supreme Court is established by Article III, Section 1 of the Constitution of the United States, which says: "The judicial Power of the United States, shall be vested in one supreme Court . . .". The size of the Court is not specified; the Constitution leaves it to Congress to set the number of justices. Under the Judiciary Act of 1789 Congress originally fixed the number of justices at six (one chief justice and five associate justices). Since 1789 Congress has varied the size of the Court from six to seven, nine, ten, and back to nine justices (always including one chief justice).

When the cases in volume 108 U.S. were decided the Court comprised the following nine members:

Portrait	Justice	Office	Home State	Succeeded	Date confirmed by the Senate (Vote)	Tenure on Supreme Court
	Morrison Waite	Chief Justice	Ohio	Salmon P. Chase	January 21, 1874 (63–0)	March 4, 1874 – March 23, 1888 (Died)
	Samuel Freeman Miller	Associate Justice	Iowa	Peter Vivian Daniel	July 16, 1862 (Acclamation)	July 21, 1862 – October 13, 1890 (Died)
	Stephen Johnson Field	Associate Justice	California	newly created seat	March 10, 1863 (Acclamation)	May 10, 1863 – December 1, 1897 (Retired)
	Joseph P. Bradley	Associate Justice	New Jersey	newly created seat	March 21, 1870 (46–9)	March 23, 1870 – January 22, 1892 (Died)
	John Marshall Harlan	Associate Justice	Kentucky	David Davis	November 29, 1877 (Acclamation)	December 10, 1877 – October 14, 1911 (Died)
	William Burnham Woods	Associate Justice	Georgia	William Strong	December 21, 1880 (39–8)	January 5, 1881 – May 14, 1887 (Died)
	Stanley Matthews	Associate Justice	Ohio	Noah Haynes Swayne	May 12, 1881 (24–23)	May 17, 1881 – March 22, 1889 (Died)
	Horace Gray	Associate Justice	Massachusetts	Nathan Clifford	December 20, 1881 (51–5)	January 9, 1882 – September 15, 1902 (Died)
	Samuel Blatchford	Associate Justice	New York	Ward Hunt	March 22, 1882 (Acclamation)	April 3, 1882 – July 7, 1893 (Died)

== Citation style ==
Under the Judiciary Act of 1789 the federal court structure at the time comprised District Courts, which had general trial jurisdiction; Circuit Courts, which had mixed trial and appellate (from the US District Courts) jurisdiction; and the United States Supreme Court, which had appellate jurisdiction over the federal District and Circuit courts—and for certain issues over state courts. The Supreme Court also had limited original jurisdiction (i.e., in which cases could be filed directly with the Supreme Court without first having been heard by a lower federal or state court). There were one or more federal District Courts and/or Circuit Courts in each state, territory, or other geographical region.

Bluebook citation style is used for case names, citations, and jurisdictions.

- "C.C.D." = United States Circuit Court for the District of . . .
  - e.g.,"C.C.D.N.J." = United States Circuit Court for the District of New Jersey
- "D." = United States District Court for the District of . . .
  - e.g.,"D. Mass." = United States District Court for the District of Massachusetts
- "E." = Eastern; "M." = Middle; "N." = Northern; "S." = Southern; "W." = Western
  - e.g.,"C.C.S.D.N.Y." = United States Circuit Court for the Southern District of New York
  - e.g.,"M.D. Ala." = United States District Court for the Middle District of Alabama
- "Ct. Cl." = United States Court of Claims
- The abbreviation of a state's name alone indicates the highest appellate court in that state's judiciary at the time.
  - e.g.,"Pa." = Supreme Court of Pennsylvania
  - e.g.,"Me." = Supreme Judicial Court of Maine

== List of cases in volume 108 U.S. ==
Case Name	Page & year	Opinion of the Court	Concurring opinion(s)	Dissenting opinion(s)	Lower Court	Disposition
In re Amendments to Rules 1 & 10	1 (1882)	Waite	none	none	original	rules amended
Johnson v. Waters	4 (1882)	Waite	none	none	C.C.D. La.	supersedeas denied
Lehigh Crane Iron Company v. Hoagland	5 (1882)	Waite	none	none	N.J. Sup. Ct.	dismissal denied
Waples v. Hays	6 (1882)	Waite	none	none	C.C.D. La.	affirmed
Bigelow v. Armes	10 (1882)	Waite	none	none	Sup. Ct. D.C.	affirmed
Gray v. Howe	12 (1882)	Waite	none	none	Sup. Ct. Terr. Utah	affirmed
Feibelman v. Packard	14 (1882)	Waite	none	none	C.C.D. La.	dismissed
Woolf v. Hamilton	15 (1883)	Waite	none	none	Sup. Ct. Terr. Utah	dismissed
City of New Orleans v. New Orleans, Mobile and Texas Railroad Company	15 (1883)	Waite	none	none	C.C.D. La.	continued
Mayer v. Walsh	17 (1883)	Waite	none	none	C.C.S.D. Miss.	continued
Chicago and Alton Railroad Company v. Wiggins Ferry Company	18 (1883)	Waite	none	none	C.C.E.D. Mo.	affirmed
St. Louis, Iron Mountain and Southern Railway v. Southern Exchange Company	24 (1883)	Waite	none	none	C.C.E.D. Mo.	dismissal denied
Missouri–Kansas–Texas Railroad Company v. Dinsmore	30 (1883)	Waite	none	none	C.C.D. Kan.	certiorari granted
Stebbins v. Duncan	32 (1883)	Woods	none	none	C.C.D. Ill.	affirmed
Connecticut Mutual Life Insurance v. Cushman	51 (1883)	Harlan	none	none	C.C.D. Ill.	affirmed
Medsker v. Bonebrake	66 (1883)	Miller	none	none	C.C.D. Ind.	reversed
Stucky v. Masonic Savings Bank	74 (1883)	Miller	none	none	C.C.D. Ky.	affirmed
New Hampshire v. Louisiana	76 (1883)	Waite	none	none	original	dismissed
The Nuestra Senora de Regla	92 (1883)	Waite	none	none	C.C.S.D.N.Y.	reversed
Crossley v. City of New Orleans	105 (1883)	Waite	none	none	La.	dismissed
Merritt v. Stephani	106 (1883)	Blatchford	none	none	C.C.S.D.N.Y.	reversed
Merritt v. Park	109 (1883)	Blatchford	none	none	C.C.S.D.N.Y.	reversed
City of Ottawa v. Carey	110 (1883)	Waite	none	none	C.C.N.D. Ill.	reversed
Arthur v. Fox	125 (1883)	Waite	none	none	C.C.S.D.N.Y.	reversed
Winchester v. Loud	130 (1883)	Waite	none	none	C.C.E.D. Mich.	affirmed
Elliott v. Sackett	132 (1883)	Blatchford	none	none	C.C.N.D. Ill.	reversed
Ewell v. Daggs	143 (1883)	Matthews	none	none	C.C.W.D. Tex.	affirmed
The Belgenland	153 (1883)	Waite	none	none	C.C.E.D. Pa.	mandamus denied
Shainwald v. Lewis	158 (1883)	Waite	none	none	C.C.D. Nev.	affirmed
Barton v. Geiler	161 (1883)	Waite	none	none	Tenn.	affirmed
Goldenberg v. Murphy	162 (1883)	Waite	none	none	C.C.S.D.N.Y.	reversed
Gage v. Pumpelly	164 (1883)	Waite	none	none	C.C.N.D. Ill.	dismissal denied
Hilton v. Dickinson	165 (1883)	Waite	none	none	Sup. Ct. D.C.	dismissed
Ludloff v. United States	176 (1883)	Blatchford	none	none	C.C.D. Md.	affirmed
City of Savannah v. Kelly	184 (1883)	Matthews	none	none	C.C.S.D. Ga.	affirmed
City of Savannah v. Martin	191 (1882)	Matthews	none	none	C.C.S.D. Ga.	affirmed
United States v. Britton I	192 (1883)	Woods	none	none	C.C.E.D. Mo.	certification
United States v. Britton II	193 (1883)	Woods	none	none	C.C.E.D. Mo.	certification
United States v. Britton III	199 (1883)	Woods	none	none	C.C.E.D. Mo.	certification
United States v. Britton IV	207 (1883)	per curiam	none	none	C.C.E.D. Mo.	dismissed
Kirkbride v. Lafayette County	208 (1883)	Harlan	none	none	C.C.W.D. Mo.	reversed
St. Paul and Chicago Railway Company v. McLean	212 (1883)	Harlan	none	none	C.C.S.D.N.Y.	affirmed
Manhattan Medicine Company v. Wood	218 (1883)	Field	none	none	C.C.D. Me.	affirmed
Memphis and Charleston Railroad Company v. United States	228 (1883)	Waite	none	none	C.C.W.D. Tenn.	reversed
Ex parte Norton	237 (1883)	Waite	none	none	C.C.E.D. La.	mandamus granted
District of Columbia v. Washington Market Company	243 (1883)	Matthews	none	none	Sup. Ct. D.C.	affirmed
Wilkins v. Ellett	256 (1883)	Gray	none	none	C.C.W.D. Tenn.	reversed
Hampton v. Phipps	260 (1883)	Matthews	none	none	C.C.D.S.C.	reversed
Basket v. Hassell	267 (1883)	Matthews	none	none	C.C.D. Ind.	rehearing denied
Rountree v. Smith	269 (1883)	Miller	none	none	C.C.W.D. Wis.	affirmed
Little Miami and Columbus and Xenia Railroad Company v. United States	277 (1883)	Waite	none	none	C.C.S.D. Ohio	reversed
Wright v. United States	281 (1883)	Waite	none	none	C.C.M.D. Tenn.	affirmed
Lewis v. City of Shreveport	282 (1883)	Waite	none	none	C.C.D. La.	affirmed
Farlow v. Kelly	288 (1883)	Waite	none	none	C.C.N.D. Ohio	affirmed
Ensminger v. Powers	292 (1883)	Blatchford	none	none	C.C.W.D. Tenn.	multiple
The Jesse Williamson, Jr.	305 (1883)	Blatchford	none	none	C.C.S.D.N.Y.	dismissed
Tutton v. Viti	312 (1883)	Gray	none	none	C.C.E.D. Pa.	affirmed
Howard County v. Booneville Central National Bank	314 (1883)	Harlan	none	none	C.C.W.D. Mo.	affirmed
Baltimore and Potomac Railroad Company v. Fifth Baptist Church	317 (1883)	Field	none	none	Sup. Ct. D.C.	affirmed
United States v. Ambrose	336 (1883)	Miller	none	none	C.C.S.D. Ohio	certification
The Tornado	342 (1883)	Blatchford	none	none	C.C.D. La.	affirmed
The Connemara	352 (1883)	Gray	none	none	C.C.D. La.	affirmed
Adriatic Fire Insurance Company v. Treadwell	361 (1883)	Matthews	none	none	C.C.S.D.N.Y.	reversed
Scruggs' Executor v. Memphis and Charleston Railroad Company	368 (1883)	Woods	none	none	C.C.N.D. Miss.	affirmed
Boese v. King	379 (1883)	Harlan	none	Matthews	N.Y.	affirmed
Warren v. King	389 (1883)	Blatchford	none	none	C.C.D. Ind.	affirmed
In re Devoe Manufacturing Company	401 (1883)	Blatchford	none	none	D.N.J.	prohibition denied
Post v. Pearson	418 (1883)	Gray	none	none	Sup. Ct. Terr. Dakota	affirmed
Hawkins v. Blake	422 (1883)	Matthews	none	none	C.C.E.D.N.C.	affirmed
Clark v. Barnard	436 (1883)	Matthews	none	none	C.C.D. Mass.	reversed
Manning v. Cape Ann Isinglass and Glue Company	462 (1883)	Woods	none	none	C.C.D. Mass.	affirmed
Downton v. Yaeger Milling Company	466 (1883)	Woods	none	none	C.C.E.D. Mo.	affirmed
Gross v. United States Mortgage Company	477 (1883)	Harlan	none	none	Ill.	affirmed
United States v. 43 Gallons of Whisky	491 (1883)	Field	none	none	C.C.D. Minn.	reversed
Connecticut Mutual Life Insurance Company v. Luchs	498 (1883)	Field	none	none	Sup. Ct. D.C.	affirmed
Western Pacific Railroad Company v. United States	510 (1883)	Miller	none	none	C.C.D. Cal.	affirmed
Vance v. Vance	514 (1883)	Miller	none	none	La.	affirmed
Washington and Georgetown Railroad Company v. District of Columbia	522 (1883)	Miller	none	none	Sup. Ct. D.C.	affirmed
Ruggles v. Illinois	526 (1883)	Waite	Harlan	none	Ill.	affirmed
Illinois Central Railroad Company v. Illinois	541 (1883)	Waite	Field; Harlan	none	Ill.	affirmed
Hawley v. Fairbanks	543 (1883)	Waite	none	none	C.C.N.D. Ill.	dismissed
Ex parte Hung Hang	552 (1883)	Waite	none	none	S.F. Police Ct.	habeas corpus denied
Meath v. Phillips County	553 (1883)	Waite	none	none	C.C.E.D. Ark.	affirmed
Ex parte Tom Tong	556 (1883)	Waite	none	none	C.C.D. Cal.	remanded
Gibson v. Bruce	561 (1883)	Waite	none	none	C.C.S.D. Ohio	affirmed
New Jersey Zinc Company v. Trotter	564 (1883)	Waite	none	none	C.C.D.N.J.	dismissed
Ex parte Baltimore and Ohio Railroad Company	566 (1883)	Waite	none	none	C.C.W.D. Va.	mandamus denied
Scarborough v. Pargoud	567 (1883)	Waite	none	none	La.	dismissed
Louisiana ex rel. New Orleans Gas Light Company v. City of New Orleans	568 (1883)	Waite	none	none	La.	dismissed
