= DC circuit =

DC circuit may refer to:

- Direct current circuit
- United States Court of Appeals for the District of Columbia Circuit, a current federal appellate court
- United States Circuit Court of the District of Columbia, a former federal court that existed from 1801 to 1863
