= United States Circuit Court of the District of Columbia =

US federal court from 1801 to 1863

- (C.C.D.C.)
- Defunct
- Location: Washington, D.C.
- Appeals from: District of Potomac; District of Columbia
- Established: February 27, 1801
- Abolished: March 3, 1863
- Judges: 3

The United States Circuit Court of the District of Columbia (in case citations, C.C.D.C.) was a United States federal court which existed from 1801 to 1863. The court was created by the District of Columbia Organic Act of 1801.

== History ==
The D.C. circuit court was not one of the United States circuit courts established by the Judiciary Act of 1789. The Circuit Court of the District of Columbia was established on February 27, 1801 by the District of Columbia Organic Act of 1801, 2 Stat. 103, which authorized one chief judge and two assistant judges who were to serve during good behavior. Congress granted the court the same powers as the U.S. circuit courts as well as local civil and criminal jurisdiction within the District of Columbia. On March 3, 1801, by 2 Stat. 123, Congress authorized the chief judge of the Circuit Court of the District of Columbia to hold the United States District Court for the District of Potomac, but this jurisdiction was short lived. On March 8, 1802, by 2 Stat. 132, the Potomac District was abolished, effective July 1, 1802. Shortly thereafter, on April 29, 1802, by 2 Stat. 156, the Judiciary Act of 1802 established the United States District Court for the District of Columbia and specified that the court would have the same jurisdiction and powers as the U.S. district courts. The act authorized the chief judge of the Circuit Court of the District of Columbia to preside in the district court.

Congress established the Criminal Court of the District of Columbia on July 7, 1838, by 5 Stat. 306. This act authorized one judge, and granted the Criminal Court the powers of the U.S. circuit courts and the Circuit Court of the District of Columbia in criminal matters. The act of February 20, 1839, 5 Stat. 319, provided that the chief judge of the Circuit Court of the District of Columbia would preside in the absence of the Criminal Court judge. On July 9, 1846, by 9 Stat. 35, The county of Alexandria in the District of Columbia was returned to the state of Virginia, and the division of the Circuit Court of the District of Columbia seated in that county was abolished upon the formal approval of retrocession, occurred September 7, 1846.

The circuit court, district court, and criminal court of the District of Columbia were finally abolished altogether on March 3, 1863, by 12 Stat. 762. A new court, the Supreme Court of the District of Columbia (later renamed the "United States District Court for the District of Columbia"), was created in its place, thus terminating the service of the three U.S. circuit court judges appointed to serve during good behavior.

== Judges of the D.C. Circuit ==
Judge	Began service	Ended service	Appointed by
William Cranch	February 28, 1801	February 24, 1806	John Adams
William Cranch	February 24, 1806	September 1, 1855	Thomas Jefferson (as chief judge) (Note: Because of the unique structure of the United States Circuit Court for the District of Columbia, the elevation of a sitting judge of the Court to chief judge of the Court is considered a separate appointment.)
Allen Duckett	March 17, 1806	July 19, 1809	Thomas Jefferson
James Dunlop	October 3, 1845; Recess	November 27, 1855	James Polk
James Dunlop	November 27, 1855; Recess	March 3, 1863	Franklin Pierce (as chief judge)
Nicholas Fitzhugh	November 25, 1803	December 31, 1814	Thomas Jefferson
Thomas Johnson	Declined	–	John Adams (as chief judge)
William Kilty	March 23, 1801; Recess	January 27, 1806	Thomas Jefferson (as chief judge)
James Marshall	March 3, 1801	November 16, 1803	John Adams
William Merrick	December 14, 1855	March 3, 1863	Franklin Pierce
James Morsell	January 11, 1815	March 3, 1863	James Madison
Buckner Thruston	December 14, 1809	August 30, 1845	James Madison
