= Tenth Circuit Act of 1863 =

United States federal law

- Other short titles: Act of March 3, 1863
- Long title: An Act to provide Circuit Courts for the Districts of California and Oregon, and for other purposes.
- Enacted by: the 37th United States Congress
- Effective: March 3, 1863

Citations
- Public law: Chapter 100
- Statutes at Large: 12 Stat. 794

Legislative history
- Introduced in the Senate as S. 533 by R‑CA Milton S. Lathamth on February 1863; Committee consideration by Senate Committee on the Judiciary; Passed the Senate on March 2, 1863 (Voice vote); Passed the House on March 3, 1863 (Voice vote); Signed into law by President Abraham Lincoln on March 3, 1863

Major amendments
- Act of February 27, 1865 (13 Stat. 440)

The Tenth Circuit Act of 1863 (12 Stat. 794) was a federal statute that increased the size of the Supreme Court of the United States from nine justices to ten, and that also reorganized the circuit courts of the federal judiciary. The newly created Tenth Circuit consisted of California and Oregon, and addressed the judicial needs of the newly created western states. The Act became effective on March 3, 1863, during the Lincoln administration.

Be it enacted by the Senate and House of Representatives of the United States of America in Congress assembled, That the supreme court of the United States shall hereafter consist of a chief justice and nine associate justices, any six of whom shall constitute a quorum; and for this purpose there shall be appointed one additional associate justice of said court, with the like powers, and to take the same oaths, perform the same duties, and be entitled to the same salary, as the other associate justices.

— Tenth Circuit Act of 1863

== History ==
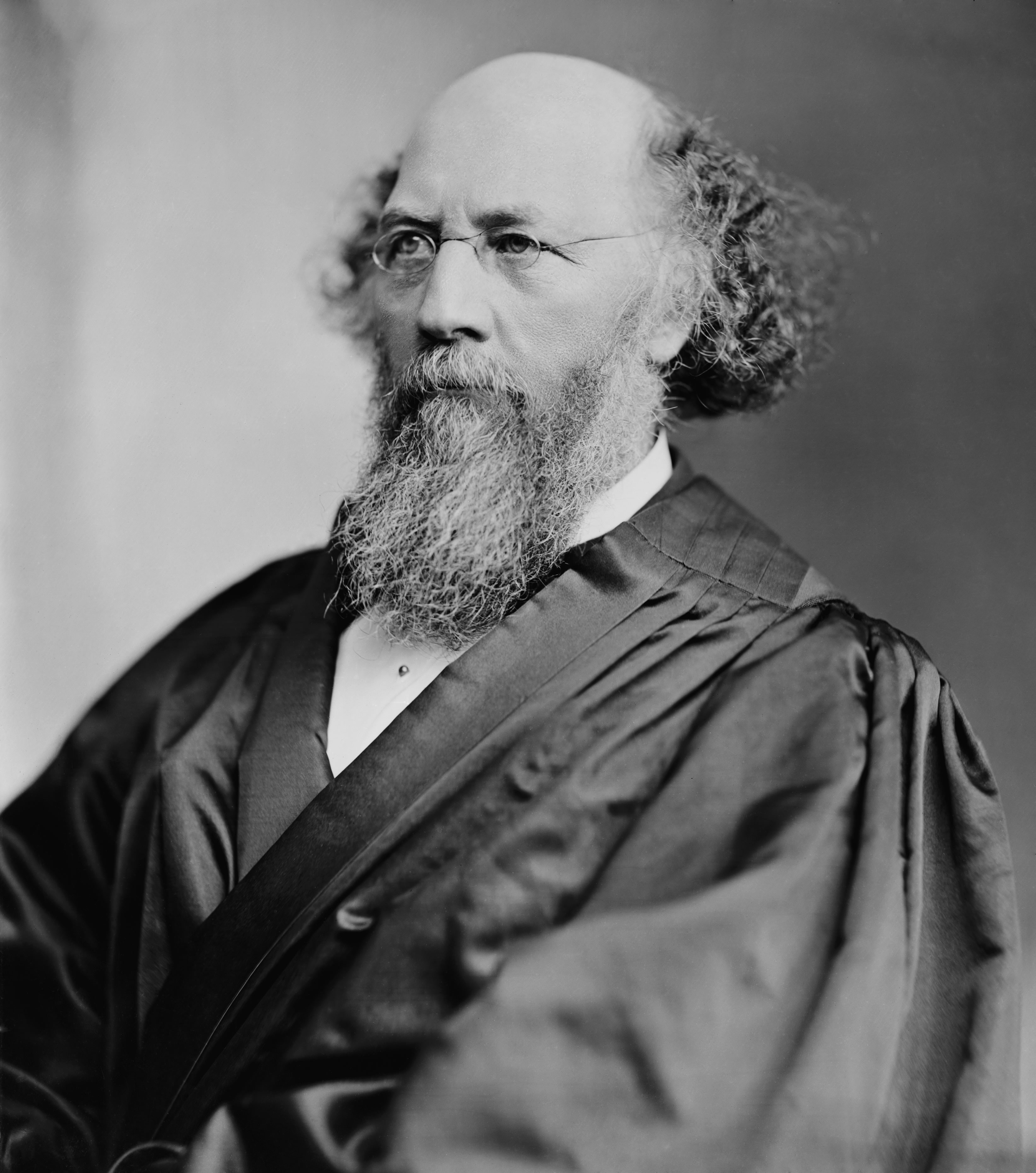
Stephen Johnson Field was the first Justice appointed to the newly created tenth seat.

The period of the American Civil War and the early stages of Reconstruction saw shakeups in the Court and in legislation concerning its size. This culminated in the Judiciary Act of 1869, as of 2026 the last piece of legislation which altered the size of the Supreme Court. Pursuant to the Tenth Circuit Act, Stephen Johnson Field was appointed to the newly-created Associate Justice seat. Shortly thereafter, Salmon P. Chase replaced Roger B. Taney as Chief Justice of the United States, and in 1865 Associate Justice John Catron died; Catron's vacancy would never be refilled as a consequence of the Judicial Circuits Act of 1866. Later Supreme Court vacancies in the coming years would be addressed by the 1869 Act, which permanently fixed the size of the Supreme Court at nine. The Court's full-strength size of ten was therefore a very brief historical aberration, straddling the end of the Taney Court (its final composition) and the beginning of the Chase Court (its first composition). The court of ten thus experienced the following changes. First, Field was appointed to its tenth seat, creating its first composition. Next, Taney died and was replaced with Chase, creating its second composition. Finally, Catron's death and his seat's subsequent abolition ended the "court of ten" era.
