= Seventh Circuit Act of 1807 =

Piece of US federal legislation

- Long title: An Act establishing Circuit Courts, and abridging the jurisdiction of the district courts in the districts of Kentucky, Tennessee and Ohio
- Enacted by: the 9th United States Congress
- Effective: May 1, 1807

Citations
- Public law: Pub. L. 9–16: 2 Stat. 420
- Statutes at Large: 2 Stat. 420

Legislative history
- Signed into law by President Thomas Jefferson on February 24, 1807

The Seventh Circuit Act of 1807 was a significant piece of legislation that expanded the federal judiciary in the United States. Enacted on February 24, 1807, this act created the Seventh Circuit and added a seventh seat to the Supreme Court.

== Background ==
Before 1807, the federal court system consisted of six circuits. As new states were admitted to the Union, the need for an additional circuit became apparent. The Seventh Circuit Act was passed to address this growing judicial demand.

== Provisions ==
=== Creation of the Seventh Circuit ===
The act established the Seventh Circuit, which initially comprised the states of Ohio, Kentucky, and Tennessee.

=== Expansion of the Supreme Court ===
A key provision of the act was the addition of a seventh justice to the Supreme Court. This expansion was directly tied to the creation of the new circuit, as Supreme Court justices were required to "ride circuit" during this period.

=== Circuit riding duties ===
The act specified that the newly appointed justice would be assigned to preside over the U.S. Circuit Court in the Seventh Circuit. This practice of "riding circuit" required Supreme Court justices to travel across the country to hear cases in their assigned circuits, a duty that was generally disliked by the justices.

=== Impact and significance ===
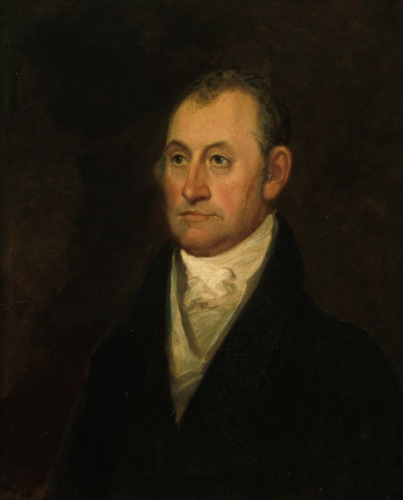
Thomas Todd was the first justice appointed to the newly created seventh seat.

The first justice appointed to the new seat was Thomas Todd.

The Seventh Circuit Act of 1807 had far-reaching implications for the federal judiciary in the United States. By expanding the geographical reach of the federal court system, it better served the needs of the growing nation, particularly in the western territories. This expansion was crucial as the country continued to add new states and territories, ensuring that citizens in these areas had access to federal courts.

The act's provision to increase the size of the Supreme Court was a significant exercise of congressional power granted by the Constitution. This expansion set an important precedent, demonstrating that the size of the nation's highest court could be adjusted to meet changing needs. It also reinforced the practice of circuit riding, which required Supreme Court justices to travel and hear cases in their assigned circuits. This practice, though often unpopular among justices, continued for nearly six decades after the act's passage.

== Text ==
SEC. 5. Be it further enacted, That the supreme court of the United States shall hereafter consist of a chief justice, and six associate justices, any law to (the) contrary notwithstanding. And for this purpose there shall be appointed a sixth associate justice, to reside in the seventh circuit, whose duty it shall be, until he is otherwise allotted, to attend the circuit courts of the said seventh circuit, and the supreme court of the United States, and who shall take the same oath, and be entitled to the same salary as are required of, and provided for the other associate justices of the United States.

— Seventh Circuit Act of 1807, section 5.
