= Eighth and Ninth Circuits Act of 1837 =

1837 Federal statute

- Long title: An Act supplementary to the act entitled "An act to amend the judicial system of the United States"
- Enacted by: the 24th United States Congress
- Effective: March 3, 1837

Citations
- Statutes at Large: 5 Stat. 176

Codification
- Acts amended: Judiciary Act of 1789

Legislative history
- Committee consideration by Senate Committee on the Judiciary; Signed into law by President Andrew Jackson on March 3, 1837

The Eighth and Ninth Circuits Act of 1837 (5 Stat. 176) was a federal statute which increased the size of the Supreme Court of the United States from seven justices to nine, and which also reorganized the circuit courts of the federal judiciary. The newly created Eighth and Ninth circuits were designed to alleviate the judicial needs of newly created western states. The Act became law on March 3, 1837, at the end of the Jackson administration.

Be it enacted, by the Senate and House of Representatives of the United States of America in Congress assembled, That the Supreme Court of the United States shall hereafter consist of a chief justice, and eight associate judges, any five of whom shall constitute a quorum; and for this purpose there shall be appointed two additional justices of said court, with the like powers, and to take the same oaths, perform the same duties, and be entitled to the same salary, as the other associate judges.

— Eighth and Ninth Circuits Act of 1837

== History ==
The period from 1834–1838 saw a major shakeup in the Court. During this period, Chief Justice John Marshall died and was replaced by Roger B. Taney, Associate Justice William Johnson died and was replaced by James Moore Wayne, and Associate Justice Gabriel Duvall resigned, being replaced by Philip P. Barbour. Further, the 1837 Act came into effect shortly after these replacements. John Catron and John McKinley were the first justices appointed to these newly created seats.

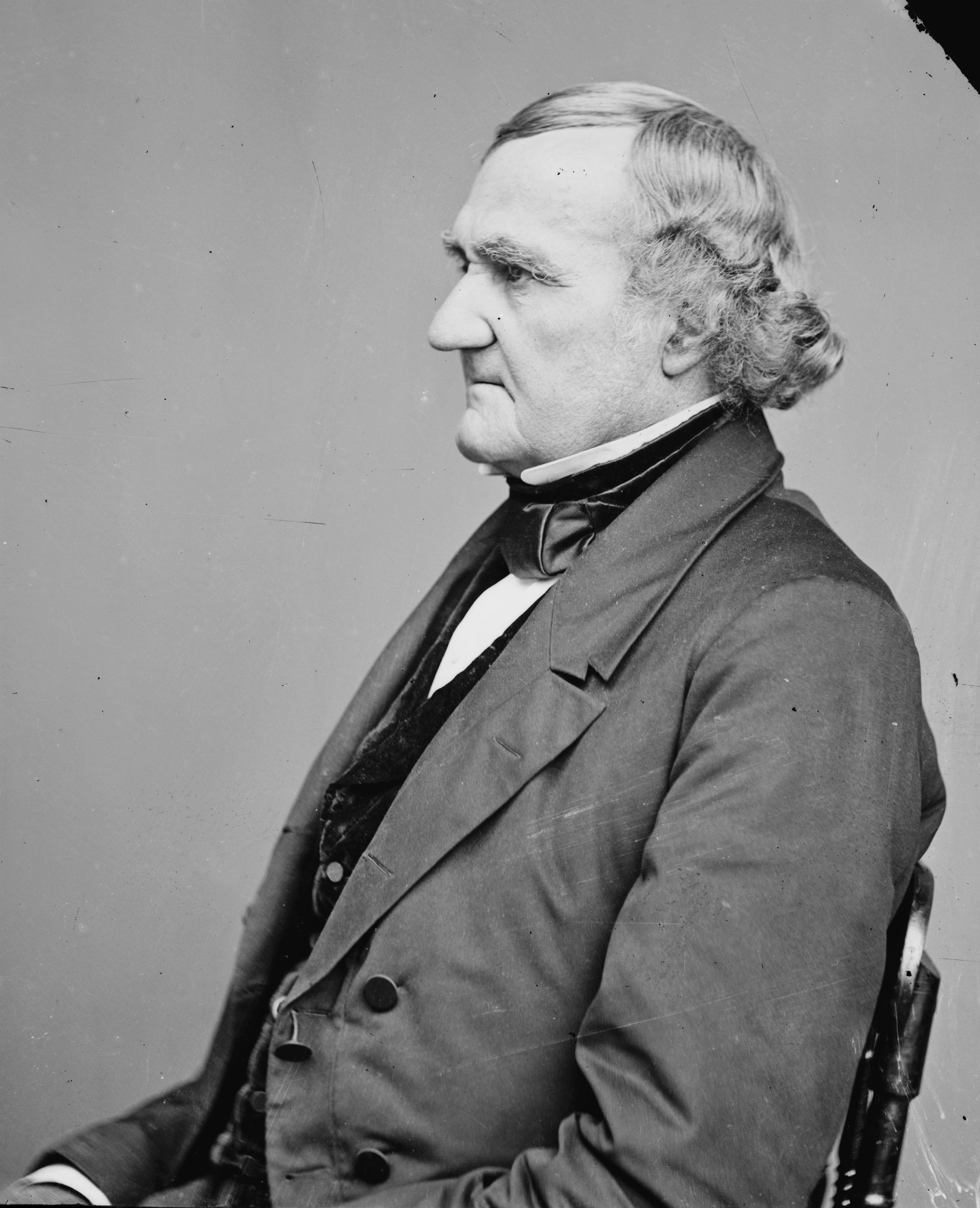
John Catron, first justice appointed to the eighth seat

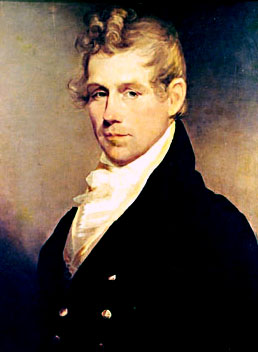
John McKinley, first Justice to serve in the ninth seat
