= Judiciary Act of 1869 =

United States statute

- Long title: An Act to amend the Judicial System of the United States
- Enacted by: the 41st United States Congress

Citations
- Statutes at Large: 16 Stat. 44

Legislative history
- Introduced in the Senate as S.44 by Lyman Trumbull on March 5, 1869; Passed the Senate on March 23, 1869; Passed the House on March 29, 1869; Signed into law by President Ulysses Grant on April 10, 1869

The Judiciary Act of 1869 (41st Congress, Sess. 1, ch. 22, 16 Stat. 44, enacted April 10, 1869), formally An Act to amend the Judicial System of the United States and sometimes called the Circuit Judges Act of 1869, is a statute providing that the Supreme Court of the United States consists of the chief justice of the United States and eight associate justices. It established separate judgeships for the U.S. circuit courts, and for the first time included a provision allowing federal judges to retire without losing their salary. It is as of 2026 the most recent legislation altering the size of the Supreme Court. The act was signed by President Ulysses S. Grant.

== Impact ==
=== Supreme Court size ===
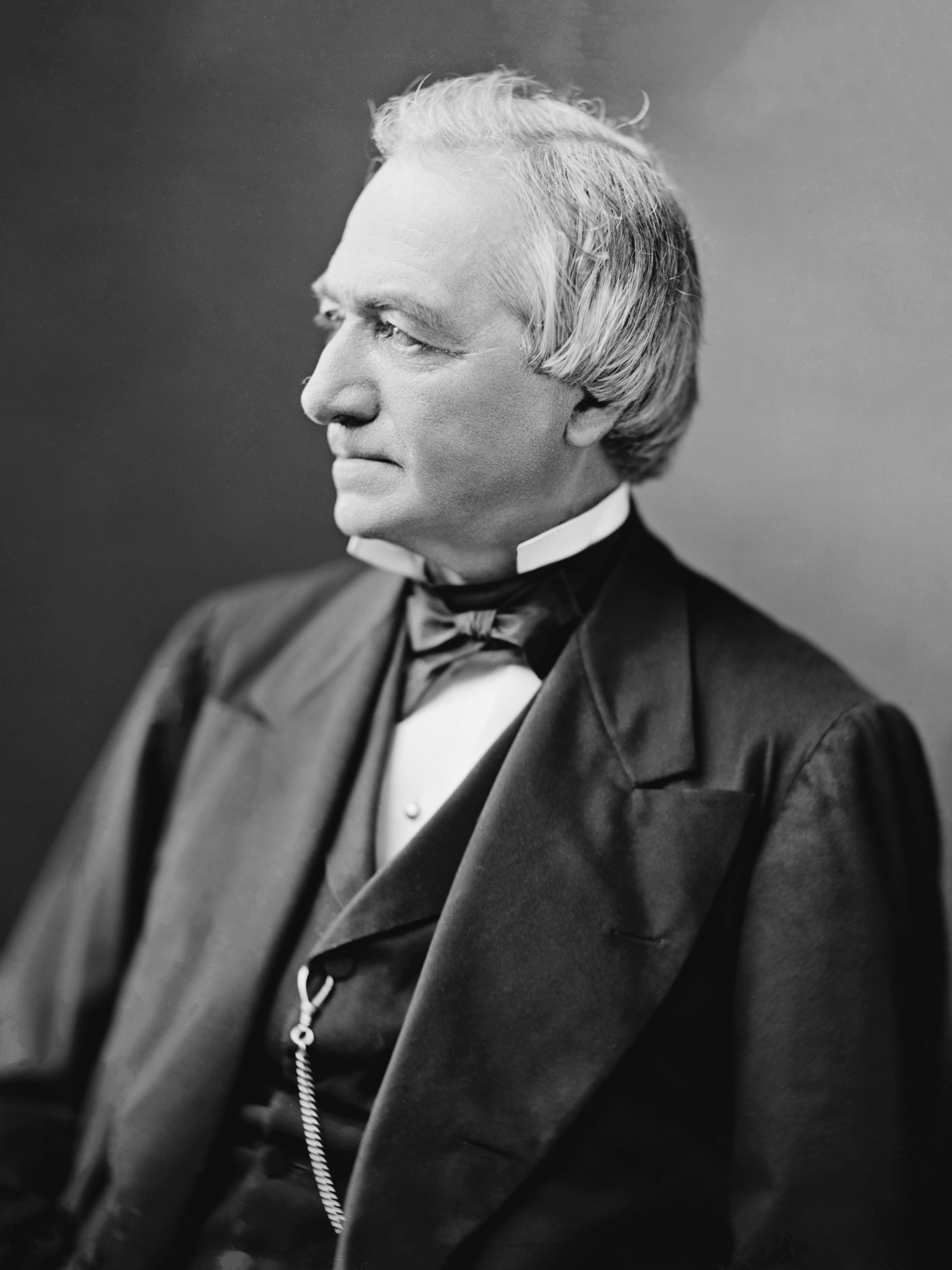
Joseph P. Bradley was the first justice appointed to the new seat created by the 1869 act

The Judicial Circuits Act of 1866 had provided that the Supreme Court be reduced in size from ten to seven justices, but the reduction was to occur only as seats were vacated. One vacancy already existed when the 1866 act took effect, that of John Catron. In addition, one other seat was vacated between the 1866 and 1869 acts, that of James Moore Wayne. As such, there were eight justices serving on the Supreme Court at the time the act was enacted.

The 1869 act set the court at nine members:

Be it enacted by the Senate and House of Representatives of the United States of America in Congress assembled, That the Supreme Court of the United States shall hereafter consist of the Chief Justice of the United States and eight associate justices, any six of whom shall constitute a quorum; and for the purposes of this act there shall be appointed an additional associate justice of said court. (bold added)

— Judiciary Act of 1869 § 1

The 1869 act therefore created a single new seat, filled by the appointment of Joseph P. Bradley.

=== U.S. Circuit Courts ===
In addition, the 1869 act stipulated that each of the nine circuit courts of the United States would have a circuit judge appointed who would reside in that locale and have the same power and jurisdiction as the Supreme Court justice assigned to the circuit. It was stipulated that the chief justice and each of the associate justices had the duty to sit at least one term in the circuit every two years. The circuit court could be held by the circuit judge, the Supreme Court justice, or the two could hold the court together, in which case the Supreme Court justice would preside. Up until this time, circuit courts were normally only staffed by district judges and Supreme Court justices "riding circuit".

The salary of the circuit court judgeships created was set at $5,000 (equivalent to $121,000 in 2025) a year. In addition, the act stipulated that federal judges (including Supreme Court justices) who had served for ten years or more would receive a pension upon their retirement. The pension was set at the salary of the judge at the time of retirement. A judge had to be at least seventy years old at the time of retirement.

An earlier version of this legislation had been approved by the 40th Congress at the close of the session in March 1869, but had fallen victim to a pocket veto from outgoing president Andrew Johnson. The act was the third time that Congress had created circuit judgeships. The first time was the soon-repealed Judiciary Act of 1801, and the second was a single circuit judgeship in the frontier state of California that lasted from 1855 to 1863.

Though the law did not abolish circuit riding by the justices of the Supreme Court, it significantly reduced the burden by requiring each justice to attend circuit court in each district within his circuit only once every two years. Circuit court riding would later be abolished by the Judiciary Act of 1891. The circuit courts themselves were abolished by the Judicial Code of 1911, which transferred their trial jurisdiction to the U.S. district courts.
