= List of United States Supreme Court taxation and revenue case law =

The Supreme Court of the United States has heard numerous cases in the area of tax law. This is an incomplete list of those cases.

== Article One ==
Case name	Citation	Constitutional provision(s) applied
A.G. Spalding & Bros. v. Edwards	262 U.S. 66 (1923)	
Alaska Fish Salting & By-Products Co. v. Smith	255 U.S. 44 (1921)	
Allen v. Regents	304 U.S. 439 (1938)	
Almy v. California	65 U.S. 169 (1860)	
Anglo-Chilean Nitrate Sales Corp. v. Alabama	288 U.S. 218 (1933)	
Bailey v. Drexel Furniture Co.	259 U.S. 20 (1922)	Article I,
Binns v. United States	194 U.S. 486 (1904)	
Board of Trustees of the University of Illinois v. United States	289 U.S. 48 (1933)	
Bowers v. Kerbaugh-Empire Co.	271 U.S. 170 (1926)	
Bowman v. Chicago & Northwestern Railway Co.	125 U.S. 465 (1888)	
Bromley v. McCaughn	280 U.S. 124 (1929)	
Brown v. Maryland	25 U.S. 419 (1827)	
Brushaber v. Union Pacific Railroad	240 U.S. 1 (1916)	Article I, Section 8, Clause 1; Sixteenth Amendment
Burnet v. Coronado Oil & Gas Co.	285 U.S. 393 (1932)	
Burnet v. Sanford & Brooks Co.	282 U.S. 359 (1931)	
Cannon v. City of New Orleans	87 U.S. 577 (1874)	
Canton Railroad Co. v. Rogan	340 U.S. 511 (1951)	
Chase National Bank v. United States	278 U.S. 327 (1929)	
Clyde Mallory Lines v. Alabama	296 U.S. 261 (1935)	
Collector v. Day	78 U.S. 113 (1870)	Article I,
Collector v. Hubbard	79 U.S. 1 (1870)	
Commissioner v. Glenshaw Glass Co.	348 U.S. 426 (1955)	
Cook v. Pennsylvania	97 U.S. 566 (1878)	
Cook v. Tait	265 U.S. 47 (1924)	
Cooley v. Board of Wardens	53 U.S. 299 (1851)	Article I,
Cornell v. Coyne	192 U.S. 418 (1904)	
Crane v. Commissioner	331 U.S. 1 (1947)	
Crew Levick Co. v. Pennsylvania	245 U.S. 292 (1917)	
Department of Revenue v. James B. Beam Co.	377 U.S. 341 (1964)	
De Treville v. Smalls	98 U.S. 517 (1878)	
Dooley v. United States	183 U.S. 151 (1901)	
Downes v. Bidwell	182 U.S. 244 (1901)	
Eisner v. Macomber	252 U.S. 189 (1920)	
Empresa Siderurgica, S.A. v. County of Merced	337 U.S. 154 (1949)	
Evans v. Gore	253 U.S. 245 (1920)	
Ex parte McNiel	80 U.S. 236 (1871)	
Fairbank v. United States	181 U.S. 283 (1901)	
Fernandez v. Weiner	326 U.S. 340 (1945)	
Flint v. Stone Tracy Company	220 U.S. 107 (1911)	Article I, Section 8, Clause 1 and Section 9, Clause 4
Florida v. Mellon	273 U.S. 12 (1927)	
Gloucester Ferry Company v. Pennsylvania	114 U.S. 196 (1885)	
Graves v. New York	306 U.S. 466 (1939)	
Greiner v. Lewellyn	258 U.S. 384 (1922)	
Grosso v. United States	390 U.S. 62 (1968)	
Gulf Fisheries Co. v. MacInerney	276 U.S. 124 (1928)	
Haynes v. United States	390 U.S. 85 (1968)	
Head Money Cases	112 U.S. 580 (1884)	Article I, Section 8, Clause 1
Helvering v. Bullard	303 U.S. 297 (1938)	
Helvering v. Gerhardt	304 U.S. 405 (1938)	
Helvering v. Griffiths	318 U.S. 371 (1943)	
Helvering v. Independent Life Ins. Co.	292 U.S. 371 (1934)	
Helvering v. Mountain Producers Corp.	303 U.S. 376 (1938)	
Helvering v. National Grocery	304 U.S. 282 (1938)	
Helwig v. United States	188 U.S. 605 (1903)	
Hill v. Wallace	259 U.S. 44 (1922)	
Hooven & Allison Co. v. Evatt	324 U.S. 652 (1945)	
Huse v. Glover	119 U.S. 543 (1886)	
Hylton v. United States	3 U.S. 171 (1796)	Article I
Indian Motorcycle v. United States	283 U.S. 570 (1931)	
Inman Steamship Co. v. Tinker	94 U.S. 238 (1876)	
In re Kollock	165 U.S. 526 (1897)	
Itel Containers Int'l Corp. v. Huddleston	507 U.S. 60 (1993)	
J. W. Hampton, Jr. & Co. v. United States	276 U.S. 394 (1928)	
Knowlton v. Moore	178 U.S. 41 (1900)	
Kosydar v. National Cash Register Co.	417 U.S. 62 (1974)	
Leary v. United States	395 U.S. 6 (1969)	
License Tax Cases	72 U.S. 462 (1866)	
Limbach v. Hoover & Allison Co.	466 U.S. 353 (1984)	
Loughborough v. Blake	18 U.S. 317 (1820)	
Low v. Austin	80 U.S. 29 (1871)	
Mager v. Grima	49 U.S. 490 (1850)	
Marchetti v. United States	390 U.S. 39 (1968)	
Massachusetts v. United States	435 U.S. 444 (1978)	
May v. New Orleans	178 U.S. 496 (1900)	
McCoach v. Mine Hill & Schuylkill Haven Railroad	228 U.S. 295 (1913)	
McGoldrick v. Gulf Oil Corp.	309 U.S. 414 (1940)	
Merchants' Loan & Trust v. Smietanka	255 U.S. 509 (1921)	
Metcalf & Eddy v. Mitchell	269 U.S. 514 (1926)	
Michelin Tire Corp. v. Wages	423 U.S. 276 (1976)	
Miles v. Graham	(268 U.S. 501 (1925)	
Morgan's Steamship Co. v. Louisiana Board of Health	118 U.S. 455 (1886)	
Nathan v. Louisiana	49 U.S. 73 (1850)	
National Federation of Independent Business v. Sebelius	567 U.S. — (2012)	Article I, Section 8, Clause 1 and Section 9, Clause 4
National Paper & Type Co. v. Bowers	266 U.S. 373 (1924)	
New York v. United States	326 U.S. 572 (1946)	
New York v. United States	505 U.S. 144 (1992)	
New York Trust Co. v. Eisner	256 U.S. 345 (1921)	
Nicol v. Ames	173 U.S. 509 (1899)	
Ohio v. Helvering	292 U.S. 360 (1934)	
Osborne v. City of Mobile	83 U.S. 479 (1872)	
Ouachita Packet Co. v. Aiken	121 U.S. 444 (1887)	
Pace v. Burgess	92 U.S. 372 (1875)	
Pacific Insurance v. Soule	74 U.S. 433 (1868)	
Packet Co. v. Catlettsburg	105 U.S. 559 (1881)	
Packet Co. v. Keokuk	95 U.S. 80 (1877)	
Packet Co. v. St. Louis	100 U.S. 423 (1879)	
Patapsco Guano Co. v. North Carolina Board of Agriculture	171 U.S. 345 (1898)	
Patton v. Brady	184 U.S. 608 (1902)	
Peck & Co. v. Lowe	247 U.S. 165 (1918)	
Peete v. Morgan	86 U.S. 581 (1873)	
Pervear v. Massachusetts	72 U.S. 475 (1866)	
Philadelphia & Southern Steamship Co. v. Pennsylvania	122 U.S. 326 (1887)	
Phillips v. Commissioner of Internal Revenue	283 U.S. 589 (1931)	
Phillips v. Dime Trust & Safe Deposit Co.	284 U.S. 160 (1931)	
Poe v. Seaborn	282 U.S. 101 (1930)	
Polar Tankers v. City of Valdez	557 U.S. 1 (2009)	
Pollock v. Farmers' Loan & Trust Co.	157 U.S. 429 (1895); 158 U.S. 601 (1895)	Article I,
Richfield Oil Corp. v. State Board of Equalization	329 U.S. 69 (1946)	
Riggs v. Del Drago	317 U.S. 95 (1942)	
R.J. Reynolds Tobacco Co. v. Durham County	479 U.S. 130 (1986)	
Scholey v. Rew	90 U.S. 331 (1874)	
Schollenberger v. Pennsylvania	171 U.S. 1 (1898)	
Selliger v. Kentucky	213 U.S. 200 (1909)	
Snyder v. Bettman	190 U.S. 249 (1903)	
Sonzinsky v. United States	300 U.S. 506 (1937)	
Spreckles Sugar Refining v. McClain	192 U.S. 397 (1904)	
Springer v. United States	102 U.S. 586 (1880)	Article I,
South Carolina v. Baker	485 U.S. 505 (1988)	Article I,
South Carolina v. United States	199 U.S. 437 (1905)	
Stanton v. Baltic Mining Company	240 U.S. 103 (1916)	Article I,
State Tonnage Tax Cases	79 U.S. 204 (1870)	
Steamship Co. v. Portwardens	73 U.S. 31 (1867)	
Stratton's Independence, Ltd. v. Howbert	231 U.S. 399 (1913)	
Sunshine Anthracite Coal Co. v. Adkins	31 U.S. 381 (1940)	
Thames & Mersey Marine Ins. Co. v. United States	237 U.S. 19 (1915)	
Thomas v. United States	192 U.S. 363 (1904)	
Thompson v. United States	155 U.S. 271 (1894)	
Towne v. Eisner	245 U.S. 418 (1918)	
Transportation Co. v. Parkersburg	107 U.S. 691 (1883)	
Transportation Co. v. Wheeling	99 U.S. 273 (1878)	
Turner v. Maryland	107 U.S. 38 (1883)	
Turpin v. Burgess	117 U.S. 504 (1886)	
Tyee Realty Co. v. Anderson	240 U.S. 115 (1916)	
Tyler v. United States	{{ussc}281|497|1930}}	
United States v. Butler	297 U.S. 1 (1936)	
United States v. Constantine	296 U.S. 287 (1935)	
United States v. Doremus	249 U.S. 86 (1919)	
United States v. Hvoslef	237 U.S. 1 (1915)	
United States v. IBM	517 U.S. 843 (1996)	
United States v. Kahriger	345 U.S. 22 (1953)	Article I,
United States v. Manufacturers National Bank	363 U.S. 194 (1960)	
United States v. Phellis	257 U.S. 156 (1921)	
United States v. Ptasynski	462 U.S. 74 (1983)	
United States v. Railroad Co.	84 U.S. 322 (1872)	
United States v. Sanchez	340 U.S. 42 (1950)	
United States v. United States Shoe Corp.	523 U.S. 360 (1998)	
United States v. Yuginovich	256 U.S. 450 (1921)	
Veazie Bank v. Fenno	75 U.S. 533 (1869)	Article I,
Vicksburg v. Tobin	100 U.S. 430 (1879)	
Waring v. The Mayor	75 U.S. 110 (1868)	
Wheeler Lumber Co. v. United States	281 U.S. 572 (1930)	
Wiggins Ferry Co. v. East St. Louis	107 U.S. 365 (1883)	
Willcuts v. Bunn	282 U.S. 216 (1931)	
Wilmette Park Dist. v. Campbell	338 U.S. 411 (1949)	
Woodruff v. Parham	75 U.S. 123 (1868)	
Xerox Corp. v. County of Harris	459 U.S. 145 (1982)	
Youngstown Co. v. Bowers	358 U.S. 534 (1959)	
Zonne v. Minneapolis Syndicate	220 U.S. 187 (1911)	

=== Section 8, Clause 1 ===
Case name	Citation
Allen v. Regents	304 U.S. 439 (1938)
A. Magnano Co. v. Hamilton	292 U.S. 40 (1934)
Binns v. United States	194 U.S. 486 (1904)
Board of Trustees of the University of Illinois v. United States	289 U.S. 48 (1933)
Bailey v. Drexel Furniture Co.	259 U.S. 20 (1922)
Brushaber v. Union Pacific Railroad	240 U.S. 1 (1916)
Burnet v. Coronado Oil & Gas Co.	285 U.S. 393 (1932)
Collector v. Day	78 U.S. 113 (1870)
Downes v. Bidwell	182 U.S. 244 (1901)
Evans v. Gore	253 U.S. 245 (1920)
Felsenheld v. United States	186 U.S. 126 (1902)
Fernandez v. Weiner	326 U.S. 340 (1945)
Flint v. Stone Tracy Company	220 U.S. 107 (1911)
Florida v. Mellon	273 U.S. 12 (1927)
Greiner v. Lewellyn	258 U.S. 384 (1922)
Grosso v. United States	390 U.S. 62 (1968)
Haynes v. United States	390 U.S. 85 (1968)
Head Money Cases	112 U.S. 580 (1884)
Helvering v. Gerhardt	304 U.S. 405 (1938)
Helvering v. Mountain Producers Corp.	303 U.S. 376 (1938)
Helvering v. Powers	293 U.S. 214 (1934)
Helwig v. United States	188 U.S. 605 (1903)
Hill v. Wallace	259 U.S. 44 (1922)
Indian Motorcycle v. United States	283 U.S. 570 (1931)
In re Kollock	165 U.S. 526 (1897)
J. W. Hampton, Jr. & Co. v. United States	276 U.S. 394 (1928)
Knowlton v. Moore	178 U.S. 41 (1900)
LaBelle Iron Works v. United States	256 U.S. 377 (1921)
Leary v. United States	395 U.S. 6 (1969)
License Tax Cases	72 U.S. 462 (1866)
Marchetti v. United States	390 U.S. 39 (1968)
Massachusetts v. United States	435 U.S. 444 (1978)
McCray v. United States	195 U.S. 27 (1904)
Metcalf & Eddy v. Mitchell	269 U.S. 514 (1926)
Miles v. Graham	(268 U.S. 501 (1925)
National Federation of Independent Business v. Sebelius	567 U.S. — (2012)
New York v. United States	326 U.S. 572 (1946)
Nigro v. United States	276 U.S. 332 (1928)
Ohio v. Helvering	292 U.S. 360 (1934)
O'Malley v. Woodrough	307 U.S. 277 (1939)
Phillips v. Commissioner of Internal Revenue	283 U.S. 589 (1931)
Poe v. Seaborn	282 U.S. 101 (1930)
Pollock v. Farmers' Loan & Trust Co.	157 U.S. 429 (1895); 158 U.S. 601 (1895)
Riggs v. Del Drago	317 U.S. 95 (1942)
Snyder v. Bettman	190 U.S. 249 (1903)
Sonzinsky v. United States	300 U.S. 506 (1937)
South Carolina v. Baker	485 U.S. 505 (1988)
South Carolina v. United States	199 U.S. 437 (1905)
Sunshine Anthracite Coal Co. v. Adkins	31 U.S. 381 (1940)
Thomas v. United States	192 U.S. 363 (1904)
United States v. Constantine	296 U.S. 287 (1935)
United States v. Doremus	249 U.S. 86 (1919)
United States v. Kahriger	345 U.S. 22 (1953)
United States v. Ptasynski	462 U.S. 74 (1983)
United States v. Railroad Co.	84 U.S. 322 (1872)
United States v. Sanchez	340 U.S. 42 (1950)
United States v. Yuginovich	256 U.S. 450 (1921)
Veazie Bank v. Fenno	75 U.S. 533 (1869)
Wheeler Lumber Co. v. United States	281 U.S. 572 (1930)
Willcuts v. Bunn	282 U.S. 216 (1931)
Wilmette Park Dist. v. Campbell	338 U.S. 411 (1949)

=== Section 9, clause 4 ===
Case name	Citation
A.G. Spalding & Bros. v. Edwards	262 U.S. 66 (1923)
Almy v. California	65 U.S. 169 (1860)
Billings v. United States	232 U.S. 261 (1914)
Bromley v. McCaughn	280 U.S. 124 (1929)
Chase National Bank v. United States	278 U.S. 327 (1929)
Cornell v. Coyne	192 U.S. 418 (1904)
De Treville v. Smalls	98 U.S. 517 (1878)
Dooley v. United States	183 U.S. 151 (1901)
Fairbank v. United States	181 U.S. 283 (1901)
Fernandez v. Weiner	326 U.S. 340 (1945)
Flint v. Stone Tracy Company	220 U.S. 107 (1911)
Helvering v. Bullard	303 U.S. 297 (1938)
Hylton v. United States	3 U.S. 171 (1796)
Knowlton v. Moore	178 U.S. 41 (1900)
Loughborough v. Blake	18 U.S. 317 (1820)
National Federation of Independent Business v. Sebelius	567 U.S. 519 (2012)
National Paper & Type Co. v. Bowers	266 U.S. 373 (1924)
New York Trust Co. v. Eisner	256 U.S. 345 (1921)
Nicol v. Ames	173 U.S. 509 (1899)
Pacific Insurance v. Soule	74 U.S. 433 (1868)
Patton v. Brady	184 U.S. 608 (1902)
Peck & Co. v. Lowe	247 U.S. 165 (1918)
Phillips v. Dime Trust & Safe Deposit Co.	284 U.S. 160 (1931)
Pollock v. Farmers' Loan & Trust Co.	157 U.S. 429 (1895); 158 U.S. 601 (1895)
Scholey v. Rew	90 U.S. 331 (1874)
Spreckles Sugar Refining v. McClain	192 U.S. 397 (1904)
Springer v. United States	102 U.S. 586 (1880)
Stanton v. Baltic Mining Company	240 U.S. 103 (1916)
Thames & Mersey Marine Ins. Co. v. United States	237 U.S. 19 (1915)
Thomas v. United States	192 U.S. 363 (1904)
Thompson v. United States	155 U.S. 271 (1894)
Turpin v. Burgess	117 U.S. 504 (1886)
Tyler v. United States	281 U.S. 497 (1930)
United States v. Hvoslef	237 U.S. 1 (1915)
United States v. IBM	517 U.S. 843 (1996)
United States v. Manufacturers National Bank	363 U.S. 194 (1960)
United States v. United States Shoe Corp.	523 U.S. 360 (1998)
Veazie Bank v. Fenno	75 U.S. 533 (1869)

=== Section 10, clause 2 ===
Case name	Citation
Anglo-Chilean Nitrate Sales Corp. v. Alabama	288 U.S. 218 (1933)
Bowman v. Chicago & Northwestern Railway Co.	125 U.S. 465 (1888)
Brown v. Maryland	25 U.S. 419 (1827)
Canton Railroad Company v. Rogan	340 U.S. 511 (1951)
Cook v. Pennsylvania	97 U.S. 566 (1878)
Cooley v. Board of Wardens	53 U.S. 299 (1851)
Cornell v. Coyne	192 U.S. 418 (1904)
Crew Levick Co. v. Pennsylvania	245 U.S. 292 (1917)
Department of Revenue v. James B. Beam Co.	377 U.S. 341 (1964)
Empresa Siderurgica, S.A. v. County of Merced	337 U.S. 154 (1949)
Gulf Fisheries Co. v. MacInerney	276 U.S. 124 (1928)
Hooven & Allison Co. v. Evatt	324 U.S. 652 (1945)
Itel Containers Int'l Corp. v. Huddleston	507 U.S. 60 (1993)
Kosydar v. National Cash Register Co.	417 U.S. 62 (1974)
Limbach v. Hoover & Allison Co.	466 U.S. 353 (1984)
Low v. Austin	80 U.S. 29 (1871)
Mager v. Grima	49 U.S. 490 (1850)
May v. New Orleans	178 U.S. 496 (1900)
McGoldrick v. Gulf Oil Corp.	309 U.S. 414 (1940)
Michelin Tire Corp. v. Wages	423 U.S. 276 (1976)
Nathan v. Louisiana	49 U.S. 73 (1850)
Patapsco Guano Co. v. North Carolina Board of Agriculture	171 U.S. 345 (1898)
Pervear v. Massachusetts	72 U.S. 475 (1866)
Richfield Oil Corp. v. State Board of Equalization	329 U.S. 69 (1946)
R.J. Reynolds Tobacco Co. v. Durham County	479 U.S. 130 (1986)
Schollenberger v. Pennsylvania	171 U.S. 1 (1898)
Selliger v. Kentucky	213 U.S. 200 (1909)
Turner v. Maryland	107 U.S. 38 (1883)
Waring v. The Mayor	75 U.S. 110 (1868)
Woodruff v. Parham	75 U.S. 123 (1868)
Xerox Corp. v. County of Harris	459 U.S. 145 (1982)
Youngstown Co. v. Bowers	358 U.S. 534 (1959)

== See also ==
- History of taxation in the United States
- Legal history of income tax in the United States
- United States Tax Court
- Lists of United States Supreme Court cases
