= List of United States Supreme Court cases, volume 171 =

Supreme Court of the United States
- Interactive map of Supreme Court of the United States
- 38°53′26″N 77°00′16″W
- Established: March 4, 1789; 236 years ago
- Location: Washington, D.C.
- Coordinates: 38°53′26″N 77°00′16″W
- Composition method: Presidential nomination with Senate confirmation
- Authorised by: Constitution of the United States, Art. III, § 1
- Judge term length: life tenure, subject to impeachment and removal
- Number of positions: 9 (by statute)
- Website: supremecourt.gov

This is a list of cases reported in volume 171 of United States Reports, decided by the Supreme Court of the United States in 1898.

== Justices of the Supreme Court at the time of volume 171 U.S. ==
The Supreme Court is established by Article III, Section 1 of the Constitution of the United States, which says: "The judicial Power of the United States, shall be vested in one supreme Court . . .". The size of the Court is not specified; the Constitution leaves it to Congress to set the number of justices. Under the Judiciary Act of 1789 Congress originally fixed the number of justices at six (one chief justice and five associate justices). Since 1789 Congress has varied the size of the Court from six to seven, nine, ten, and back to nine justices (always including one chief justice).

When the cases in volume 171 were decided the Court comprised the following nine members:

Portrait	Justice	Office	Home State	Succeeded	Date confirmed by the Senate (Vote)	Tenure on Supreme Court
	Melville Fuller	Chief Justice	Illinois	Morrison Waite	July 20, 1888 (41–20)	October 8, 1888 – July 4, 1910 (Died)
	John Marshall Harlan	Associate Justice	Kentucky	David Davis	November 29, 1877 (Acclamation)	December 10, 1877 – October 14, 1911 (Died)
	Horace Gray	Associate Justice	Massachusetts	Nathan Clifford	December 20, 1881 (51–5)	January 9, 1882 – September 15, 1902 (Died)
	David Josiah Brewer	Associate Justice	Kansas	Stanley Matthews	December 18, 1889 (53–11)	January 6, 1890 – March 28, 1910 (Died)
	Henry Billings Brown	Associate Justice	Michigan	Samuel Freeman Miller	December 29, 1890 (Acclamation)	January 5, 1891 – May 28, 1906 (Retired)
	George Shiras Jr.	Associate Justice	Pennsylvania	Joseph P. Bradley	July 26, 1892 (Acclamation)	October 10, 1892 – February 23, 1903 (Retired)
	Edward Douglass White	Associate Justice	Louisiana	Samuel Blatchford	February 19, 1894 (Acclamation)	March 12, 1894 – December 18, 1910 (Continued as chief justice)
	Rufus W. Peckham	Associate Justice	New York	Howell Edmunds Jackson	December 9, 1895 (Acclamation)	January 6, 1896 – October 24, 1909 (Died)
	Joseph McKenna	Associate Justice	California	Stephen Johnson Field	January 21, 1898 (Acclamation)	January 26, 1898 – January 5, 1925 (Retired)

== Notable Case in 171 U.S. ==
=== Smyth v. Ames ===
In Smyth v. Ames, 171 U.S. 361 (1898), also called The Maximum Freight Case, the Supreme Court voided a Nebraska railroad tariff law, declaring that it violated the Fourteenth Amendment to the United States Constitution in that it took property without due process of law. The Court defined the constitutional limits of governmental power to set railroad and utility rates by stating that regulated industries have the right to a "fair return". Smyth was overturned by the Court in 1944 in Federal Power Commission v. Hope Natural Gas Co..

== Citation style ==
Under the Judiciary Act of 1789 the federal court structure at the time comprised District Courts, which had general trial jurisdiction; Circuit Courts, which had mixed trial and appellate (from the US District Courts) jurisdiction; and the United States Supreme Court, which had appellate jurisdiction over the federal District and Circuit courts—and for certain issues over state courts. The Supreme Court also had limited original jurisdiction (i.e., in which cases could be filed directly with the Supreme Court without first having been heard by a lower federal or state court). There were one or more federal District Courts and/or Circuit Courts in each state, territory, or other geographical region.

The Judiciary Act of 1891 created the United States Courts of Appeals and reassigned the jurisdiction of most routine appeals from the district and circuit courts to these appellate courts. The Act created nine new courts that were originally known as the "United States Circuit Courts of Appeals." The new courts had jurisdiction over most appeals of lower court decisions. The Supreme Court could review either legal issues that a court of appeals certified or decisions of court of appeals by writ of certiorari.

Bluebook citation style is used for case names, citations, and jurisdictions.

- "# Cir." = United States Court of Appeals
  - e.g., "3d Cir." = United States Court of Appeals for the Third Circuit
- "C.C.D." = United States Circuit Court for the District of . . .
  - e.g.,"C.C.D.N.J." = United States Circuit Court for the District of New Jersey
- "D." = United States District Court for the District of . . .
  - e.g.,"D. Mass." = United States District Court for the District of Massachusetts
- "E." = Eastern; "M." = Middle; "N." = Northern; "S." = Southern; "W." = Western
  - e.g.,"C.C.S.D.N.Y." = United States Circuit Court for the Southern District of New York
  - e.g.,"M.D. Ala." = United States District Court for the Middle District of Alabama
- "Ct. Cl." = United States Court of Claims
- The abbreviation of a state's name alone indicates the highest appellate court in that state's judiciary at the time.
  - e.g.,"Pa." = Supreme Court of Pennsylvania
  - e.g.,"Me." = Supreme Judicial Court of Maine

== List of cases in volume 171 U.S. ==
Case Name	Page and year	Opinion of the Court	Concurring opinion(s)	Dissenting opinion(s)	Lower Court	Disposition
Schollenberger v. Pennsylvania ex rel. Paul	1 (1898)	Peckham	none	Gray	Pa.	reversed
Collins v. New Hampshire	30 (1898)	Peckham	none	Harlan	N.H.	reversed
Pounds v. United States	35 (1898)	McKenna	none	none	C.C.N.D. Ala.	affirmed
Harrison v. Morton	38 (1898)	McKenna	none	none	Md.	dismissed
Detroit Citizens' Street Railway Company v. Detroit Railway Company	48 (1898)	McKenna	none	none	Mich.	affirmed
Del Monte Mining and Milling Company v. Last Chance Mining and Milling Company	55 (1898)	Brewer	none	none	8th Cir.	certification
Clark v. Fitzgerald	92 (1898)	Brewer	none	none	Mont.	affirmed
Johnson v. Drew	93 (1898)	Brewer	none	none	Fla.	affirmed
Tinsley v. Anderson	101 (1898)	Fuller	none	none	C.C.N.D. Tex.	affirmed
Central National Bank v. Stevens	108 (1898)	per curiam	none	none	N.Y.	mandate undisturbed
North American Commercial Company v. United States	110 (1898)	Fuller	none	none	2d Cir.	reversed
Pullman's Palace Car Company v. Central Transportation Company	138 (1898)	Peckham	none	none	C.C.E.D. Pa.	reversed
District of Columbia v. Bailey	161 (1898)	White	none	none	D.C. Cir.	reversed
Young v. Amy	179 (1898)	White	none	none	Utah	affirmed
The Irrawaddy	187 (1898)	Shiras	none	Brown	2d Cir.	certification
Hubbell v. United States	203 (1898)	Brown	none	none	Ct. Cl.	affirmed
Tidewater Oil Company v. United States	210 (1898)	Brown	none	none	Ct. Cl.	affirmed
Ely's Administrator v. United States	220 (1898)	Brewer	none	none	Ct. Priv. Land Cl.	reversed
United States v. Maish	242 (1898)	Brewer	none	none	Ct. Priv. Land Cl.	reversed
Faxon v. United States	244 (1898)	Fuller	none	none	Ct. Priv. Land Cl.	affirmed
Northern Pacific Railroad Company v. Smith	260 (1898)	Shiras	Brewer	none	8th Cir.	reversed
Camou v. United States	277 (1898)	Brewer	none	none	Ct. Priv. Land Cl.	reversed
Perrin v. United States	292 (1898)	Brewer	none	none	Ct. Priv. Land Cl.	reversed
Walrath v. Champion Mining Company	293 (1898)	McKenna	none	none	9th Cir.	affirmed
City of New Orleans v. Texas and Pacific Railway Company	312 (1898)	Fuller	none	none	C.C.E.D. La.	reversed
Patapsco Guano Company v. North Carolina Board of Agriculture	345 (1898)	Fuller	none	none	C.C.E.D.N.C.	affirmed
Smyth v. Ames	361 (1898)	Harlan	none	none	C.C.D. Neb.	affirmed
White v. Berry	366 (1898)	Harlan	none	none	C.C.D.W. Va.	reversed
White v. Butler	379 (1898)	Harlan	none	none	C.C.D.W. Va.	reversed
Thompson v. Missouri	380 (1898)	Harlan	none	none	Mo.	affirmed
Baldy v. Hunter	388 (1898)	Harlan	none	none	Ga.	affirmed
King v. Mullins	404 (1898)	Harlan	none	none	C.C.D.W. Va.	affirmed
King v. Panther Lumber Company	437 (1898)	Harlan	none	none	C.C.D.W. Va.	affirmed
California National Bank v. Thomas	441 (1898)	Brown	none	none	Cal.	dismissed
California National Bank v. Stateler	447 (1898)	Brown	none	none	Cal.	dismissed
The G.R. Booth	450 (1898)	Gray	none	none	2d Cir.	certification
The Silvia	462 (1898)	Gray	none	none	2d Cir.	affirmed
Briggs v. Walker	466 (1898)	Gray	none	none	Ky.	affirmed
Hubbard v. Tod	474 (1898)	Fuller	none	none	8th Cir.	affirmed
United States v. Joint Traffic Association	505 (1898)	Peckham	none	none	2d Cir.	reversed
Hopkins v. United States	578 (1898)	Peckham	none	none	8th Cir.	reversed
Anderson v. United States	604 (1898)	Peckham	none	none	8th Cir.	reversed
Northwestern National Bank v. Freeman	620 (1898)	McKenna	none	none	Sup. Ct. Terr. Ariz.	affirmed
Brown v. United States	631 (1898)	Shiras	none	none	U.S. Ct. Ind. Terr.	dismissed
Naeglin v. De Cordoba	638 (1898)	Brewer	none	none	Sup. Ct. Terr. N.M.	affirmed
Pierce v. Somerset Railway Company	641 (1898)	Peckham	none	none	Me.	dismissed
St. Louis Mining and Milling Company v. Montana Mining and Milling Company	650 (1898)	Fuller	none	none	Mont.	affirmed
New York v. Roberts	658 (1898)	Shiras	none	Harlan	N.Y. Sup. Ct.	affirmed

== See also ==
- Certificate of division
