= Canton Railroad =

Railroad in Maryland, United States

Canton Railroad Company

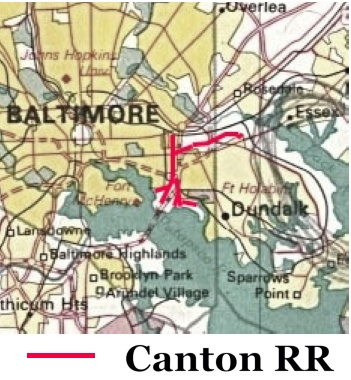

Overview
- Headquarters: Baltimore, MD
- Reporting mark: CTN
- Locale: Baltimore, Maryland
- Dates of operation: 1907–

Technical
- Track gauge: 4 ft 8 1/2 in (1,435 mm) standard gauge
- Length: 6 mi. main, 17 mi. secondary

Other
- Website: http://www.cantonrr.com/

The Canton Railroad (reporting mark CTN) is a Class III switching and terminal railroad, operating in eastern Baltimore City and Baltimore County. It serves the Helen Delich Bentley Port of Baltimore and local shipping companies, and connects with two Class I railroads: CSX Transportation and the Norfolk Southern Railway.

== History ==
After the federal government enacted legislation in 1905 approving the dredging of shipping channels to the Baltimore harbor to a depth of 35 feet, the Canton Company of Baltimore, a marine terminal operator, sought to develop property it owned in southeast Baltimore for use by manufacturers and shippers. This necessitated access to rail services. Since neither of the two local railroad companies, the Baltimore and Ohio (B&O) and Pennsylvania Railroad Companies, were willing to extend their lines to undeveloped areas, the Canton Company decided in 1905 to build its own local railroad.

The Canton Railroad Company was chartered in 1906 by the Canton Company, to serve industrial, manufacturing, and shipping customers in the Baltimore port area. Its tracks, starting from the interconnection with the Pennsylvania Railroad, were laid during the period from 1905 through 1914. The Canton track interconnected with the B&O Railroad in 1910. Rail operations began in 1907.

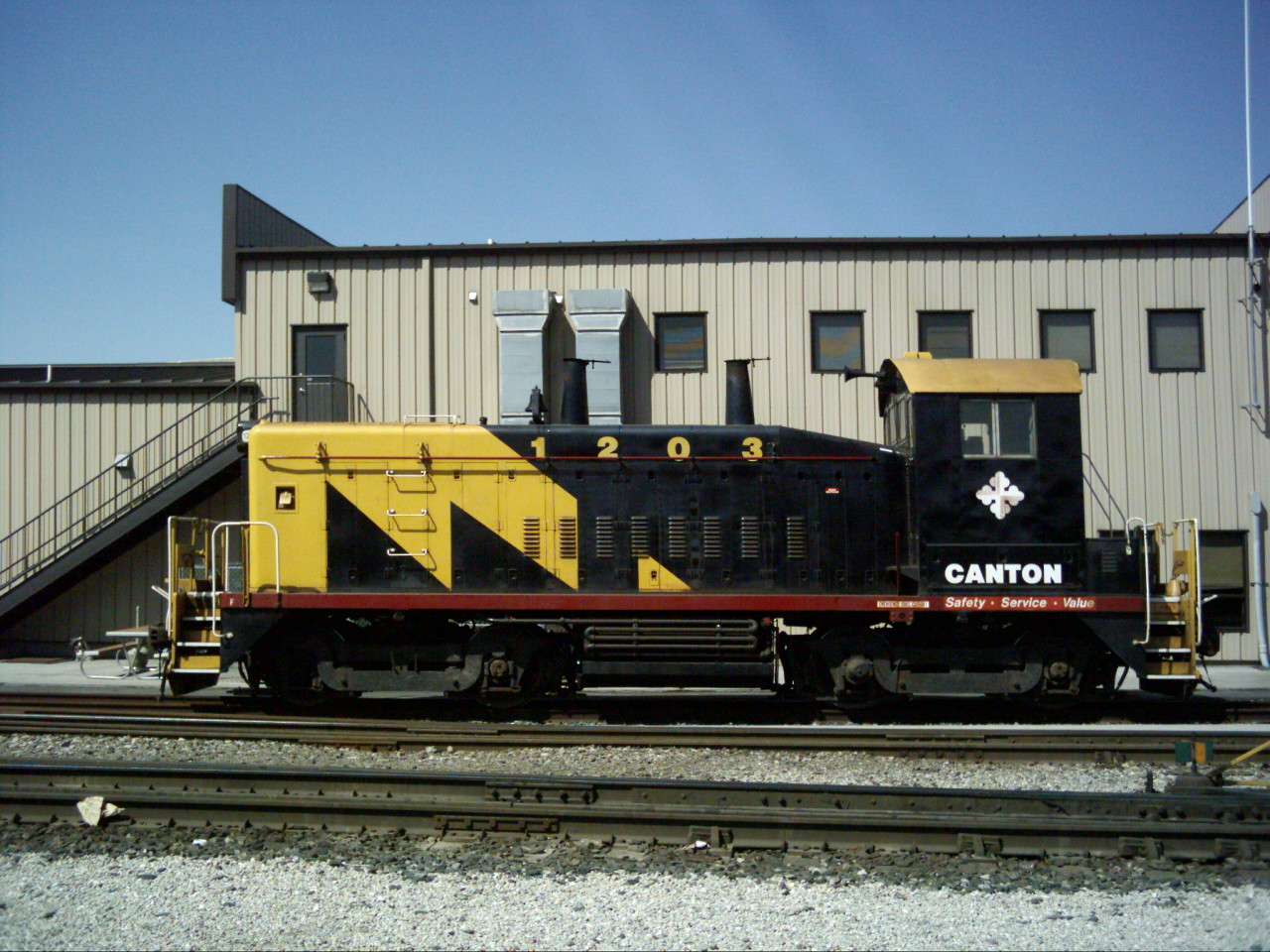
Canton Railroad engine 1203

The Canton Company was purchased by the conglomerate International Mining Company in 1960. It passed through several owners in the 1970s and 1980s. In 1984, alleged financial improprieties by the owners of the Canton Development Company, then the owner of the railroad, led to its being placed into receivership. The State of Maryland purchased the Canton Railroad at a bankruptcy auction in 1987 for $875,000 to provide railway access to the Seagirt Terminal of the Port of Baltimore. Although Canton Railroad Company was acquired by the State of Maryland, the Railroad operates as a for-profit enterprise with no State fund involvement.

The Canton Railroad dispute with Maryland involving whether the state franchise tax on railroad activities in the port of Baltimore violated the Import-Export or Commerce Clauses of the Constitution led to the Supreme Court case Canton Railroad Company v. Rogan, 340 U.S. 511 (1951).

== Current operations ==
Today the Canton Railroad is owned by the Maryland Transportation Authority and operates as a for-profit enterprise. Engines used by the Canton Railroad are painted yellow and black in a pattern similar to that used in the Maryland and Baltimore flags. The railroad currently operates 6 miles of mainline and 17 miles of secondary track.
