= List of United States Supreme Court cases, volume 184 =

Supreme Court of the United States
- Interactive map of Supreme Court of the United States
- 38°53′26″N 77°00′16″W
- Established: March 4, 1789; 236 years ago
- Location: Washington, D.C.
- Coordinates: 38°53′26″N 77°00′16″W
- Composition method: Presidential nomination with Senate confirmation
- Authorised by: Constitution of the United States, Art. III, § 1
- Judge term length: life tenure, subject to impeachment and removal
- Number of positions: 9 (by statute)
- Website: supremecourt.gov

This is a list of cases reported in volume 184 of United States Reports, decided by the Supreme Court of the United States in 1902.

== Justices of the Supreme Court at the time of volume 184 U.S. ==
The Supreme Court is established by Article III, Section 1 of the Constitution of the United States, which says: "The judicial Power of the United States, shall be vested in one supreme Court . . .". The size of the Court is not specified; the Constitution leaves it to Congress to set the number of justices. Under the Judiciary Act of 1789 Congress originally fixed the number of justices at six (one chief justice and five associate justices). Since 1789 Congress has varied the size of the Court from six to seven, nine, ten, and back to nine justices (always including one chief justice).

When the cases in volume 184 were decided the Court comprised the following nine members:

Portrait	Justice	Office	Home State	Succeeded	Date confirmed by the Senate (Vote)	Tenure on Supreme Court
	Melville Fuller	Chief Justice	Illinois	Morrison Waite	July 20, 1888 (41–20)	October 8, 1888 – July 4, 1910 (Died)
	John Marshall Harlan	Associate Justice	Kentucky	David Davis	November 29, 1877 (Acclamation)	December 10, 1877 – October 14, 1911 (Died)
	Horace Gray	Associate Justice	Massachusetts	Nathan Clifford	December 20, 1881 (51–5)	January 9, 1882 – September 15, 1902 (Died)
	David Josiah Brewer	Associate Justice	Kansas	Stanley Matthews	December 18, 1889 (53–11)	January 6, 1890 – March 28, 1910 (Died)
	Henry Billings Brown	Associate Justice	Michigan	Samuel Freeman Miller	December 29, 1890 (Acclamation)	January 5, 1891 – May 28, 1906 (Retired)
	George Shiras Jr.	Associate Justice	Pennsylvania	Joseph P. Bradley	July 26, 1892 (Acclamation)	October 10, 1892 – February 23, 1903 (Retired)
	Edward Douglass White	Associate Justice	Louisiana	Samuel Blatchford	February 19, 1894 (Acclamation)	March 12, 1894 – December 18, 1910 (Continued as chief justice)
	Rufus W. Peckham	Associate Justice	New York	Howell Edmunds Jackson	December 9, 1895 (Acclamation)	January 6, 1896 – October 24, 1909 (Died)
	Joseph McKenna	Associate Justice	California	Stephen Johnson Field	January 21, 1898 (Acclamation)	January 26, 1898 – January 5, 1925 (Retired)

== Citation style ==
Under the Judiciary Act of 1789 the federal court structure at the time comprised District Courts, which had general trial jurisdiction; Circuit Courts, which had mixed trial and appellate (from the US District Courts) jurisdiction; and the United States Supreme Court, which had appellate jurisdiction over the federal District and Circuit courts—and for certain issues over state courts. The Supreme Court also had limited original jurisdiction (i.e., in which cases could be filed directly with the Supreme Court without first having been heard by a lower federal or state court). There were one or more federal District Courts and/or Circuit Courts in each state, territory, or other geographical region.

The Judiciary Act of 1891 created the United States Courts of Appeals and reassigned the jurisdiction of most routine appeals from the district and circuit courts to these appellate courts. The Act created nine new courts that were originally known as the "United States Circuit Courts of Appeals." The new courts had jurisdiction over most appeals of lower court decisions. The Supreme Court could review either legal issues that a court of appeals certified or decisions of court of appeals by writ of certiorari.

Bluebook citation style is used for case names, citations, and jurisdictions.

- "# Cir." = United States Court of Appeals
  - e.g., "3d Cir." = United States Court of Appeals for the Third Circuit
- "C.C.D." = United States Circuit Court for the District of . . .
  - e.g.,"C.C.D.N.J." = United States Circuit Court for the District of New Jersey
- "D." = United States District Court for the District of . . .
  - e.g.,"D. Mass." = United States District Court for the District of Massachusetts
- "E." = Eastern; "M." = Middle; "N." = Northern; "S." = Southern; "W." = Western
  - e.g.,"C.C.S.D.N.Y." = United States Circuit Court for the Southern District of New York
  - e.g.,"M.D. Ala." = United States District Court for the Middle District of Alabama
- "Ct. Cl." = United States Court of Claims
- The abbreviation of a state's name alone indicates the highest appellate court in that state's judiciary at the time.
  - e.g.,"Pa." = Supreme Court of Pennsylvania
  - e.g.,"Me." = Supreme Judicial Court of Maine

== List of cases in volume 184 U.S. ==
Case Name	Page and year	Opinion of the Court	Concurring opinion(s)	Dissenting opinion(s)	Lower Court	Disposition
Mueller v. Nugent	1 (1902)	Fuller	none	none	6th Cir.	reversed
Louisville Trust Company v. Comingor	18 (1902)	Fuller	none	none	6th Cir.	affirmed
Louisville and Nashville Railroad Company v. Kentucky	27 (1902)	Peckham	none	Brewer	Ky. Cir. Ct.	reversed
United States v. Southern Pacific Railroad Company	49 (1902)	Brewer	none	none	9th Cir.	multiple
King v. City of Portland	61 (1902)	McKenna	none	none	Or.	affirmed
McDonald v. Thompson	71 (1902)	Brown	none	none	8th Cir.	affirmed
Illinois v. Illinois Central Railroad Company	77 (1902)	Harlan	none	none	7th Cir.	affirmed
Brainard v. Buck	99 (1902)	Peckham	none	none	D.C. Cir.	affirmed
Cleveland Trust Company v. Lander	111 (1902)	McKenna	none	none	Ohio	affirmed
Voigt v. City of Detroit	115 (1902)	McKenna	none	none	Mich.	affirmed
United States v. Barlow	123 (1902)	McKenna	none	none	Ct. Cl.	affirmed
United States v. Ewing	140 (1902)	Peckham	none	none	Ct. Cl.	reversed
Lake Benton First National Bank v. Watt	151 (1902)	White	none	none	Minn.	affirmed
League v. Texas	156 (1902)	Brewer	none	none	Tex.	affirmed
Hatfield v. King	162 (1902)	Brewer	none	none	C.C.D.W. Va.	reversed
Lykins v. McGrath	169 (1902)	Brewer	none	none	C.C.D. Kan.	affirmed
Marande v. Texas Pacific Railroad Company	173 (1902)	White	none	none	2d Cir.	reversed
Minnesota v. Northern Securities Company	199 (1902)	Shiras	none	none	original	leave to file bill denied
United States v. St. Louis and Mississippi Valley Transportation Company	247 (1902)	Shiras	none	none	Ct. Cl.	affirmed
Studebaker v. Perry	258 (1902)	Shiras	none	none	7th Cir.	affirmed
Terlinden v. Ames	270 (1902)	Fuller	none	none	N.D. Ill.	affirmed
Huguley Manufacturing Company v. Galeton Cotton Mills	290 (1902)	Fuller	none	none	5th Cir.	dismissed
In re Huguley Manufacturing Company	297 (1902)	Fuller	none	none	C.C.N.D. Ga.	mandamus denied
Waite v. City of Santa Cruz	302 (1902)	Harlan	none	none	9th Cir.	reversed
Clark v. City of Titusville	329 (1902)	McKenna	none	none	Pa.	affirmed
Rothschild v. Knight	334 (1902)	McKenna	none	none	Mass. Super. Ct.	affirmed
Schuerman v. Arizona	342 (1902)	Peckham	none	none	Sup. Ct. Terr. Ariz.	affirmed
Skaneateles Waterworks Company v. Village of Skaneateles	354 (1902)	Peckham	none	none	N.Y. Sup. Ct.	affirmed
City of Detroit v. Detroit Citizens' Street Railway Company	368 (1902)	Peckham	none	none	C.C.E.D. Mich.	affirmed
Wilson v. Standefer	399 (1902)	Shiras	none	none	Tex. Civ. App.	affirmed
United States v. Rio Grand Dam and Irrigation Company	416 (1902)	Harlan	none	none	Sup. Ct. Terr. N.M.	reversed
Booth v. Illinois	425 (1902)	Harlan	none	none	Ill.	affirmed
Goodrich v. City of Detroit	432 (1902)	Brown	none	none	Mich.	affirmed
United States v. Martinez	441 (1902)	Brown	none	none	Ct. Priv. Land Cl.	reversed
O'Brien v. Wheelock	450 (1902)	Fuller	none	none	7th Cir.	affirmed
Tullock v. Mulvane	497 (1902)	White	none	Harlan	Kan.	reversed
Monroe v. United States	524 (1902)	McKenna	none	none	Ct. Cl.	affirmed
Missouri, Kansas and Texas Railway Company v. Elliott	530 (1902)	White	none	none	Mo. Ct. App.	reversed
Connolly v. Union Sewer Pipe Company	540 (1902)	Harlan	none	McKenna	C.C.N.D. Ill.	affirmed
United States v. Camou	572 (1902)	Shiras	none	none	Ct. Priv. Land Cl.	affirmed
Eidman v. Martinez	578 (1902)	Brown	none	none	2d Cir.	certification
Moore v. Ruckgaber	593 (1902)	Brown	none	none	2d Cir.	certification
Busch v. Jones	598 (1902)	McKenna	none	none	D.C. Cir.	reversed
Patton v. Brady	608 (1902)	Brewer	none	none	C.C.E.D. Va.	affirmed
Reloj Cattle Company v. United States	624 (1902)	Fuller	none	none	Ct. Priv. Land Cl.	affirmed
Ainsa v. United States	639 (1902)	Fuller	none	none	Ct. Priv. Land Cl.	affirmed
Arivaca Land Cattle Company v. United States	649 (1902)	Fuller	none	none	Ct. Priv. Land Cl.	affirmed
United States v. Baca	653 (1902)	Gray	none	none	Ct. Priv. Land Cl.	reversed
Emblen v. Lincoln Land Company	660 (1902)	Fuller	none	none	8th Cir.	affirmed
Iron Gate Bank v. Brady	665 (1902)	Brewer	none	none	C.C.E.D. Va.	remanded for abatement
Gwin v. United States	669 (1902)	Brown	none	none	N.D. Cal.	dismissed
Howard v. United States	676 (1902)	Harlan	none	none	8th Cir.	affirmed

== See also ==
- Certificate of division
