= Veazie Bank v. Fenno =

- Supreme Court of the United States

Argued October 18, 1869 Decided December 13, 1869
- Full case name: Veazie Bank v. Fenno
- Citations: 75 U.S. 533 (more) 8 Wall. 533; 19 L. Ed. 482

Case history
- Prior: Appeal from the Circuit Court of Maine

Court membership
- Chief Justice Salmon P. Chase Associate Justices Samuel Nelson · Robert C. Grier; Nathan Clifford · Noah H. Swayne; Samuel F. Miller · David Davis; Stephen J. Field

Case opinions
- Majority: Chase, joined by Grier, Clifford, Swayne, Miller, Field
- Dissent: Nelson, joined by Davis

Veazie Bank v. Fenno, 75 U.S. (8 Wall.) 533 (1869), was a United States Supreme Court case.

== Background ==
Congress passed an act on July 13, 1866, which imposed a 10 per cent tax on notes of private persons, state banks, and state banking associations.

The Veazie Bank paid the tax under protest, alleging that Congress had no power to pass such an act.

The Circuit Court of Maine, in which action was brought to recover the amount of the tax paid, being divided in its opinion, the case was brought to the Supreme Court upon the question of the constitutionality of the act

(1) That it was a direct tax and had not been apportioned according to population
(2) That the act imposing the tax impairs a franchise granted by the State, and that Congress has no power to pass any law with that intent or effect.

== Opinion of the Court ==
In a 5–2 opinion, Chief Justice Salmon P. Chase held that this use of Congress's taxing power was authorized.

Congress had just undertaken to provide for a uniform currency for the country. To protect the newly established national bank from undue competition for the state banks, Congress was using its power indirectly when it could have used a direct method. Congress had to protect the newly established bank notes and restrain the notes of the state banks as money. Authority to do this arose from its power to regulate the circulation of coin.

It cannot be doubted that under the Constitution the power to provide a circulation of coin is given to Congress. And it is settled by the uniform practice of the government and by repeated decisions, that Congress may constitutionally authorize the emission of bills of credit. ... Having thus, in the exercise of undisputed constitutional powers, undertaken to provide a currency for the whole country, it cannot be questioned that Congress may, constitutionally, secure the benefit of it to the people by appropriate legislation. To this end, Congress has denied the quality of legal tender to foreign coins, and has provided by law against the imposition of counterfeit and base coin on the community. To the same end, Congress may restrain, by suitable enactments, the circulation as money of any notes not issued under its own authority. Without this power, indeed, its attempts to secure a sound and uniform currency for the country must be futile.
