= List of United States Supreme Court cases, volume 72 =

This is a list of cases reported in volume 72 (5 Wall.) of United States Reports, decided by the Supreme Court of the United States from 1865 to 1867.

== Nominative reports ==
In 1874, the U.S. government created the United States Reports, and retroactively numbered older privately published case reports as part of the new series. As a result, cases appearing in volumes 1–90 of U.S. Reports have dual citation forms; one for the volume number of U.S. Reports, and one for the volume number of the reports named for the relevant reporter of decisions (these are called "nominative reports").

=== John William Wallace ===
Starting with the 66th volume of U.S. Reports, the Reporter of Decisions of the Supreme Court of the United States was John William Wallace. Wallace was Reporter of Decisions from 1863 to 1874, covering volumes 68 through 90 of United States Reports which correspond to volumes 1 through 23 of his Wallace's Reports. As such, the dual form of citation to, for example, Christmas v. Russell is 72 U.S. (5 Wall.) 290 (1866).

Wallace's Reports were the final nominative reports for the US Supreme Court; starting with volume 91, cases were identified simply as "(volume #) U.S. (page #) (year)".

== Justices of the Supreme Court at the time of 72 U.S. (5 Wall.) ==
The Supreme Court is established by Article III, Section 1 of the Constitution of the United States, which says: "The judicial Power of the United States, shall be vested in one supreme Court . . .". The size of the Court is not specified; the Constitution leaves it to Congress to set the number of justices. Under the Judiciary Act of 1789 Congress originally fixed the number of justices at six (one chief justice and five associate justices). Since 1789 Congress has varied the size of the Court from six to seven, nine, ten, and back to nine justices (always including one chief justice).

When the cases in 72 U.S. (5 Wall.) were decided the Court comprised these nine members:

Portrait	Justice	Office	Home State	Succeeded	Date confirmed by the Senate (Vote)	Tenure on Supreme Court
	Salmon P. Chase	Chief Justice	Ohio	Roger B. Taney	December 6, 1864 (Acclamation)	December 15, 1864 – May 7, 1873 (Died)
	James Moore Wayne	Associate Justice	Georgia	William Johnson	January 9, 1835 (Acclamation)	January 14, 1835 – July 5, 1867 (Died)
	Samuel Nelson	Associate Justice	New York	Smith Thompson	February 14, 1845 (Acclamation)	February 27, 1845 – November 28, 1872 (Retired)
	Robert Cooper Grier	Associate Justice	Pennsylvania	Henry Baldwin	August 4, 1846 (Acclamation)	August 10, 1846 – January 31, 1870 (Retired)
	Nathan Clifford	Associate Justice	Maine	Benjamin Robbins Curtis	January 12, 1858 (26–23)	January 21, 1858 – July 25, 1881 (Died)
	Noah Haynes Swayne	Associate Justice	Ohio	John McLean	January 24, 1862 (38–1)	January 27, 1862 – January 24, 1881 (Retired)
	Samuel Freeman Miller	Associate Justice	Iowa	Peter Vivian Daniel	July 16, 1862 (Acclamation)	July 21, 1862 – October 13, 1890 (Died)
	David Davis	Associate Justice	Illinois	John Archibald Campbell	December 8, 1862 (Acclamation)	December 10, 1862 – March 4, 1877 (Resigned)
	Stephen Johnson Field	Associate Justice	California	newly created seat	March 10, 1863 (Acclamation)	May 10, 1863 – December 1, 1897 (Retired)

== Citation style ==
Under the Judiciary Act of 1789 the federal court structure at the time comprised District Courts, which had general trial jurisdiction; Circuit Courts, which had mixed trial and appellate (from the US District Courts) jurisdiction; and the United States Supreme Court, which had appellate jurisdiction over the federal District and Circuit courts—and for certain issues over state courts. The Supreme Court also had limited original jurisdiction (i.e., in which cases could be filed directly with the Supreme Court without first having been heard by a lower federal or state court). There were one or more federal District Courts and/or Circuit Courts in each state, territory, or other geographical region.

Bluebook citation style is used for case names, citations, and jurisdictions.

- "C.C.D." = United States Circuit Court for the District of . . .
  - e.g.,"C.C.D.N.J." = United States Circuit Court for the District of New Jersey
- "D." = United States District Court for the District of . . .
  - e.g.,"D. Mass." = United States District Court for the District of Massachusetts
- "E." = Eastern; "M." = Middle; "N." = Northern; "S." = Southern; "W." = Western
  - e.g.,"C.C.S.D.N.Y." = United States Circuit Court for the Southern District of New York
  - e.g.,"M.D. Ala." = United States District Court for the Middle District of Alabama
- "Ct. Cl." = United States Court of Claims
- The abbreviation of a state's name alone indicates the highest appellate court in that state's judiciary at the time.
  - e.g.,"Pa." = Supreme Court of Pennsylvania
  - e.g.,"Me." = Supreme Judicial Court of Maine

== List of cases in 72 U.S. (5 Wall.) ==
Case Name	Page & year	Opinion of the Court	Concurring opinion(s)	Dissenting opinion(s)	Lower Court	Disposition
The Springbok	1 (1867)	Chase	none	none	S.D.N.Y.	multiple
The Peterhoff	28 (1867)	Chase	none	none	S.D.N.Y.	reversed
United States v. Weed	62 (1867)	Miller	none	none	E.D. La.	affirmed
Watson v. Sutherland	74 (1867)	Davis	none	none	C.C.D. Md.	affirmed
Parmelee v. Simpson	81 (1867)	Davis	none	none	Sup. Ct. Terr. Neb.	reversed
Woodworth v. Corn E. Ins. Co.	87 (1867)	Miller	none	none	N.D. Ill.	affirmed
Illinois C.R.R. Co. v. Barron	90 (1867)	Nelson	none	none	C.C.N.D. Ill.	affirmed
Hadden v. Collector	107 (1867)	Field	none	none	C.C.S.D.N.Y.	affirmed
Shelton v. Collector	113 (1867)	Swayne	none	none	C.C.D. Mass.	affirmed
Stanley v. Colt	119 (1867)	Nelson	none	none	C.C.D. Conn.	affirmed
The Dashing Wave	170 (1867)	Chase	none	none	E.D. La.	affirmed
The Science	178 (1867)	Chase	none	none	E.D. La.	affirmed
The Volant	179 (1867)	Chase	none	none	E.D. La.	reversed
The Teresita	180 (1867)	Chase	none	none	E.D. La.	affirmed
The Jenny	183 (1867)	Chase	none	none	E.D. La.	reversed
Ex parte Milwaukee R.R. Co.	188 (1867)	Miller	none	none	C.C.D. Wis.	supersedeas granted
Barton v. Forsyth	190 (1867)	Clifford	none	none	C.C.N.D. Ill.	dismissed
Campbell v. City of Kenosha	194 (1867)	Davis	none	none	C.C.D. Wis.	reversed
Myers v. Fenn	205 (1867)	Nelson	none	none	C.C.N.D. Ill.	affirmed
Seaver v. Bigelows	208 (1867)	Nelson	none	none	C.C.N.D. Ill.	dismissed
United States v. Repentigny	211 (1867)	Nelson	none	none	D. Mich.	reversed
Croxall v. Shererd	268 (1867)	Swayne	Miller	none	C.C.D.N.J.	affirmed
Christmas v. Russell	290 (1866)	Clifford	none	none	C.C.S.D. Miss.	affirmed
Green v. Van Buskirk	307 (1867)	Miller	none	Nelson	N.Y. Sup. Ct.	dismissal denied
Dwyer v. Dunbar	318 (1867)	Swayne	none	none	E.D. Tex.	affirmed
Townsend v. Greeley	326 (1867)	Field	none	none	Cal.	affirmed
Townsend v. Burbank	337 (1867)	Chase	none	none	Cal.	affirmed
Francis v. United States	338 (1867)	Grier	none	none	C.C.D. Mo.	affirmed
The Gray Jacket I	342 (1867)	Swayne	none	none	E.D. La.	affirmed
The Gray Jacket II	370 (1867)	Chase	none	none	E.D. La.	argument granted
The Hampton	372 (1867)	Miller	none	none	Sup. Ct. D.C.	affirmed
The William Bagaley	377 (1867)	Clifford	none	none	E.D. La.	affirmed
Ewing v. City of St. Louis	413 (1867)	Field	none	none	C.C.D. Mo.	affirmed
De Groot v. United States	419 (1867)	Miller	none	none	Ct. Cl.	affirmed
Nichols v. Levy	433 (1867)	Swayne	none	none	C.C.M.D. Tenn.	reversed
United States v. Armijo	444 (1867)	Field	none	none	N.D. Cal.	affirmed
Serrano v. United States	451 (1867)	Davis	none	none	D. Cal.	reversed
License Tax Cases	462 (1867)	Chase	none	none	multiple	revenue statues upheld
Pervear v. Massachusetts	475 (1867)	Chase	none	none	Mass.	affirmed
The Eddy	481 (1867)	Clifford	none	none	C.C.D.S.C.	affirmed
Hansbrough v. Peck	497 (1867)	Nelson	none	none	C.C.N.D. Ill.	affirmed
Howard Ins. Co. v. Chase	509 (1867)	Davis	none	none	C.C.D. Me.	affirmed
The Sir William Peel	517 (1867)	Chase	none	none	E.D. La.	affirmed
United States v. Pico	536 (1867)	Field	none	none	D. Cal.	affirmed
Merchants' Ins. Co. v. Ritchie	541 (1867)	Chase	none	none	C.C.D. Mass.	dismissed
The Bird of Paradise	545 (1867)	Clifford	none	none	C.C.N.D. Cal.	reversed
United States v. Commissioner	563 (1867)	Nelson	none	none	Sup. Ct. D.C.	affirmed
Goodrich v. City of Chicago	566 (1867)	Swayne	none	none	N.D. Ill.	affirmed
The Pearl	574 (1867)	Chase	none	none	S.D. Fla.	ship & cargo condemned
Jones v. La Vallette	579 (1867)	Chase	none	none	C.C.E.D. La.	dismissed
Washington S. Packet Co. v. Sickles	580 (1867)	Nelson	none	Miller	Sup. Ct. D.C.	reversed
De Haro v. United States	599 (1867)	Davis	none	none	N.D. Cal.	affirmed
The Sea Lion	630 (1867)	Swayne	none	Grier	S.D. Fla.	affirmed
United States v. MacDonald	647 (1867)	Clifford	none	none	C.C.D. Me.	affirmed
Milwaukee & M.R.R. Co. v. Soutter	660 (1867)	Miller	none	none	C.C.D. Wis.	reversed
Thompson v. Riggs	663 (1867)	Clifford	none	none	Sup. Ct. D.C.	affirmed
Wolcott v. Des Moines Co.	681 (1867)	Nelson	none	none	C.C.S.D.N.Y.	affirmed
Nash v. Towne	689 (1867)	Clifford	none	none	C.C.D. Wis.	affirmed
City of Galena v. Amy	705 (1867)	Swayne	none	none	C.C.N.D. Ill.	affirmed
Bates v. Brown	710 (1867)	Swayne	none	none	C.C.N.D. Ill.	affirmed
City of Philadelphia v. Collector	720 (1867)	Clifford	none	none	C.C.E.D. Pa.	affirmed
Kansas Indians Cases	737 (1867)	Davis	none	none	Kan.	reversed
New York Indians	761 (1867)	Nelson	none	none	N.Y.	reversed
Marshall County v. Schenck	772 (1867)	Clifford	none	none	C.C.N.D. Ill.	affirmed
Kelly v. Crawford	785 (1867)	Field	none	none	C.C.N.D. Ill.	affirmed
O'Neal v. Kirkpatrick	791 (1867)	Nelson	none	none	C.C.D. Cal.	affirmed
Deery v. Cray	795 (1867)	Miller	none	none	C.C.D. Md.	reversed
Lee v. Dodge	808 (1865)	Miller	none	none	C.C.N.D. Ill.	reversed
Withenbury v. United States	819 (1867)	Chase	none	none	S.D. Ill.	dismissal denied
Seymour v. Freer	822 (1867)	Chase	none	none	C.C.N.D. Ill.	dismissal denied
Garrison v. Cass County	823 (1867)	Chase	none	none	Sup. Ct. Terr. Neb.	dismissed
Alviso v. United States	824 (1867)	Chase	none	none	N.D. Cal.	dismissed
German v. United States	825 (1867)	Chase	none	none	S.D. Cal.	dismissed
Ex parte Milwaukee R.R. Co.	825 (1867)	Miller	none	none	C.C.D. Wis.	mandamus granted
Higueras v. United States	827 (1865)	Clifford	none	none	N.D. Cal.	affirmed

== See also ==
certificate of division
