= List of United States Supreme Court cases, volume 65 =

Supreme Court of the United States
- Interactive map of Supreme Court of the United States
- 38°53′26″N 77°00′16″W
- Established: March 4, 1789; 237 years ago
- Location: Washington, D.C.
- Coordinates: 38°53′26″N 77°00′16″W
- Composition method: Presidential nomination with Senate confirmation
- Authorised by: Constitution of the United States, Art. III, § 1
- Judge term length: life tenure, subject to impeachment and removal
- Number of positions: 9 (by statute)
- Website: supremecourt.gov

This is a list of cases reported in volume 65 (24 How.) of United States Reports, decided by the Supreme Court of the United States in 1860 and 1861.

== Nominative reports ==
In 1874, the U.S. government created the United States Reports, and retroactively numbered older privately published case reports as part of the new series. As a result, cases appearing in volumes 1–90 of U.S. Reports have dual citation forms; one for the volume number of U.S. Reports, and one for the volume number of the reports named for the relevant reporter of decisions (these are called "nominative reports").

=== Benjamin Chew Howard ===
Starting with the 42nd volume of U.S. Reports, the Reporter of Decisions of the Supreme Court of the United States was Benjamin Chew Howard. Howard was Reporter of Decisions from 1843 to 1860, covering volumes 42 through 65 of United States Reports which correspond to volumes 1 through 24 of his Howard's Reports. As such, the dual form of citation to, for example, Christ Church v. Philadelphia County is 65 U.S. (24 How.) 300 (1861).

== Justices of the Supreme Court at the time of 65 U.S. (24 How.) ==
The Supreme Court is established by Article III, Section 1 of the Constitution of the United States, which says: "The judicial Power of the United States, shall be vested in one supreme Court . . .". The size of the Court is not specified; the Constitution leaves it to Congress to set the number of justices. Under the Judiciary Act of 1789 Congress originally fixed the number of justices at six (one chief justice and five associate justices). Since 1789 Congress has varied the size of the Court from six to seven, nine, ten, and back to nine justices (always including one chief justice).

Due to an unfilled vacancy, when the cases in 65 U.S. (24 How.) were decided the Court comprised only these eight members:

Portrait	Justice	Office	Home State	Succeeded	Date confirmed by the Senate (Vote)	Tenure on Supreme Court
	Roger B. Taney	Chief Justice	Maryland	John Marshall	March 15, 1836 (29–15)	March 28, 1836 – October 12, 1864 (Died)
	John McLean	Associate Justice	Ohio	Robert Trimble	March 7, 1829 (Acclamation)	January 11, 1830 – April 4, 1861 (Died)
	James Moore Wayne	Associate Justice	Georgia	William Johnson	January 9, 1835 (Acclamation)	January 14, 1835 – July 5, 1867 (Died)
	John Catron	Associate Justice	Tennessee	newly created seat	March 8, 1837 (28–15)	May 1, 1837 – May 30, 1865 (Died)
	Samuel Nelson	Associate Justice	New York	Smith Thompson	February 14, 1845 (Acclamation)	February 27, 1845 – November 28, 1872 (Retired)
	Robert Cooper Grier	Associate Justice	Pennsylvania	Henry Baldwin	August 4, 1846 (Acclamation)	August 10, 1846 – January 31, 1870 (Retired)
	John Archibald Campbell	Associate Justice	Alabama	John McKinley	March 22, 1853 (Acclamation)	April 11, 1853 – April 30, 1861 (Resigned)
	Nathan Clifford	Associate Justice	Maine	Benjamin Robbins Curtis	January 12, 1858 (26–23)	January 21, 1858 – July 25, 1881 (Died)

== Citation style ==
Under the Judiciary Act of 1789 the federal court structure at the time comprised District Courts, which had general trial jurisdiction; Circuit Courts, which had mixed trial and appellate (from the US District Courts) jurisdiction; and the United States Supreme Court, which had appellate jurisdiction over the federal District and Circuit courts—and for certain issues over state courts. The Supreme Court also had limited original jurisdiction (i.e., in which cases could be filed directly with the Supreme Court without first having been heard by a lower federal or state court). There were one or more federal District Courts and/or Circuit Courts in each state, territory, or other geographical region.

Bluebook citation style is used for case names, citations, and jurisdictions.

- "C.C.D." = United States Circuit Court for the District of . . .
  - e.g.,"C.C.D.N.J." = United States Circuit Court for the District of New Jersey
- "D." = United States District Court for the District of . . .
  - e.g.,"D. Mass." = United States District Court for the District of Massachusetts
- "E." = Eastern; "M." = Middle; "N." = Northern; "S." = Southern; "W." = Western
  - e.g.,"C.C.S.D.N.Y." = United States Circuit Court for the Southern District of New York
  - e.g.,"M.D. Ala." = United States District Court for the Middle District of Alabama
- "Ct. Cl." = United States Court of Claims
- The abbreviation of a state's name alone indicates the highest appellate court in that state's judiciary at the time.
  - e.g.,"Pa." = Supreme Court of Pennsylvania
  - e.g.,"Me." = Supreme Judicial Court of Maine

== List of cases in 65 U.S. (24 How.) ==
Case Name	Page & year	Opinion of the Court	Concurring opinion(s)	Dissenting opinion(s)	Lower court	Disposition
Moore v. American T. Co.	1 (1861)	Nelson	none	Catron	Mich.	affirmed
Jones v. Soulard	41 (1861)	Catron	none	none	C.C.D. Mo.	affirmed
Grants of land bounded by fresh-water rivers, where the expressions designating the water-line are general, confer riparian rights to the center of the river. The size of the river does not affect this rule. The border of St. Louis, Missouri extends to the center of the Mississippi River.
Ex parte Kentucky	66 (1861)	Taney	none	none	original	mandamus denied
Sturgis v. Boyer	110 (1860)	Clifford	none	none	C.C.S.D.N.Y.	affirmed
Palmer v. United States	125 (1861)	Grier	none	none	N.D. Cal.	affirmed
United States v. Chana	131 (1861)	Campbell	none	none	N.D. Cal.	reversed
Hall v. Papin	132 (1861)	Wayne	none	none	C.C.N.D. Ill.	reversed
Eberly v. Moore	147 (1861)	Campbell	none	none	W.D. Tex.	affirmed
Fitch v. Creighton	159 (1860)	McLean	none	none	C.C.N.D. Ohio	affirmed
Phillips v. Page	164 (1861)	Nelson	none	none	C.C.N.D.N.Y.	reversed
Almy v. California	169 (1861)	Taney	none	none	Cal. Ct. Sessions	reversed
Meehan v. Forsyth	175 (1861)	Campbell	none	none	C.C.N.D. Ill.	reversed
Gregg v. Forsyth	179 (1861)	Campbell	none	none	C.C.N.D. Ill.	reversed
Ballance v. Forsyth	183 (1861)	Campbell	none	none	C.C.N.D. Ill.	affirmed
Kellogg v. Forsyth	186 (1861)	Campbell	none	none	C.C.N.D. Ill.	dismissal denied
Richardson v. City of Boston	188 (1861)	Grier	none	none	C.C.D.R.I.	affirmed
Nations v. Johnson	195 (1861)	Clifford	none	none	W.D. Tex.	affirmed
Sampson v. Welsh	207 (1861)	Taney	none	none	C.C.E.D. Pa.	dismissed
Vigel v. Naylor	208 (1861)	Catron	none	none	C.C.D.C.	reversed
Davila v. Mumford	214 (1861)	Nelson	none	none	W.D. Tex.	affirmed
Chandler v. Von Roeder	224 (1861)	Campbell	none	none	W.D. Tex.	reversed
Pearce v. Page	228 (1861)	McLean	none	none	C.C.D. Ky.	reversed
Thompson v. Roberts	233 (1861)	Grier	none	none	C.C.D. Md.	affirmed
McEwen v. Den's Lessee	242 (1861)	Catron	none	none	C.C.E.D. Tenn.	reversed
Powhatan S.B. Co. v. Appomattox R.R. Co.	247 (1861)	Clifford	none	none	C.C.E.D. Va.	reversed
Gue v. Tide Water C. Co.	257 (1861)	Taney	none	none	C.C.D. Md.	affirmed
League v. Egery	264 (1861)	Campbell	none	none	E.D. Tex.	affirmed
Foote v. Egery	267 (1861)	Campbell	none	none	E.D. Tex.	affirmed
Greer v. Mezes	268 (1861)	Grier	none	none	C.C.N.D. Cal.	affirmed
Frost's Lessee v. Frostburg Coal Co.	278 (1861)	Nelson	none	none	C.C.D. Md.	affirmed
Cleveland Ins. Co. v. Reed	284 (1861)	Catron	none	none	D. Wis.	affirmed
Bissell v. City of Jeffersonville	287 (1861)	Clifford	none	none	C.C.D. Ind.	reversed
Christ Church v. Philadelphia Cnty.	300 (1861)	Campbell	none	none	Pa.	affirmed
Wiggins v. Gray	303 (1861)	Taney	none	none	C.C.N.D. Cal.	certification
Union S.S. Co. v. New York & V.S.S. Co.	307 (1861)	Clifford	none	none	C.C.E.D. Va.	affirmed
Martin v. Thomas ex rel. Rogers	315 (1861)	McLean	none	none	D. Wis.	reversed
Mayer v. White	317 (1861)	Nelson	none	none	C.C.D. Md.	reversed
Fackler v. Ford	322 (1861)	Grier	none	none	Sup. Ct. Terr. Kan.	affirmed
Washington, et al. Packet Co. v. Sickles	333 (1861)	Campbell	none	none	C.C.D.C.	reversed
United States v. Castro	346 (1861)	Taney	none	none	N.D. Cal.	reversed
Day v. Washburn	352 (1861)	Nelson	none	none	C.C.D. Ind.	affirmed
Tate v. Carney	357 (1861)	Campbell	none	none	La.	affirmed
Massey v. Papin	362 (1861)	Catron	none	none	Mo.	affirmed
Amey v. City of Allegheny	364 (1861)	Wayne	none	none	C.C.W.D. Pa.	certification
Knox Cnty. v. Aspinwall	376 (1861)	Grier	none	none	C.C.D. Ind.	affirmed
Bulkley v. Naumkeag S.C. Co.	386 (1860)	Nelson	none	none	C.C.D. Mass.	affirmed
Clements v. Warner	394 (1861)	Campbell	none	none	C.C.S.D. Ill.	reversed
Smith's Lessee v. McCann	398 (1861)	Taney	none	none	C.C.D. Md.	affirmed
Adler v. Fenton	407 (1861)	Campbell	none	none	D. Wis.	reversed
Medberry v. Ohio	413 (1861)	Grier	none	none	Ohio	dismissed
Porter v. Foley	415 (1861)	Grier	none	none	Ky.	dismissed
Reddall v. Bryan	420 (1861)	Taney	none	none	Md.	dismissed
Sheirburn v. De Cordova	423 (1861)	Campbell	none	none	W.D. Tex.	affirmed
Tracy v. Holcombe	426 (1861)	Taney	none	none	Minn.	dismissed
Suydam v. Williamson	427 (1861)	Campbell	none	none	C.C.S.D.N.Y.	reversed
Curtis v. Butler Cnty.	435 (1861)	Wayne	none	none	C.C.W.D. Pa.	certification
Freeman v. Howe	450 (1861)	Nelson	none	none	Mass.	reversed
A state court executing a bill in equity lacks authority to interfere with property under the control of a federal court. However, a party with an interest in the outcome of the federal case could bring a federal claim to the property under federal control using ancillary jurisdiction. This case was the first to recognize ancillary jurisdiction.
Howard v. Bugbee	461 (1861)	Nelson	none	none	Ala.	reversed
Perin v. Carey	465 (1861)	Wayne	none	none	C.C.S.D. Ohio	affirmed
Belcher v. Linn	508 (1861)	Clifford	none	none	C.C.D. Mo.	affirmed
Knight v. Schell	526 (1861)	Clifford	none	none	C.C.S.D.N.Y.	certification
Belcher v. Linn	533 (1861)	Clifford	none	none	C.C.D. Mo.	affirmed
Berthold v. Goldsmith	536 (1861)	Clifford	none	none	C.C.D. Mo.	affirmed
Wheeler v. Nesbitt	544 (1861)	Clifford	none	none	C.C.M.D. Tenn.	affirmed
Gaines v. Hennen	553 (1861)	Wayne	none	Catron, Grier	C.C.E.D. La.	reversed

== See also ==
- certificate of division
