= List of United States Supreme Court cases, volume 117 =

Supreme Court of the United States
- Interactive map of Supreme Court of the United States
- 38°53′26″N 77°00′16″W
- Established: March 4, 1789; 236 years ago
- Location: Washington, D.C.
- Coordinates: 38°53′26″N 77°00′16″W
- Composition method: Presidential nomination with Senate confirmation
- Authorised by: Constitution of the United States, Art. III, § 1
- Judge term length: life tenure, subject to impeachment and removal
- Number of positions: 9 (by statute)
- Website: supremecourt.gov

This is a list of cases reported in volume 117 of United States Reports, decided by the Supreme Court of the United States in 1886.

== Justices of the Supreme Court at the time of volume 117 U.S. ==
The Supreme Court is established by Article III, Section 1 of the Constitution of the United States, which says: "The judicial Power of the United States, shall be vested in one supreme Court . . .". The size of the Court is not specified; the Constitution leaves it to Congress to set the number of justices. Under the Judiciary Act of 1789 Congress originally fixed the number of justices at six (one chief justice and five associate justices). Since 1789 Congress has varied the size of the Court from six to seven, nine, ten, and back to nine justices (always including one chief justice).

When the cases in volume 117 U.S. were decided the Court comprised the following nine members:

Portrait	Justice	Office	Home State	Succeeded	Date confirmed by the Senate (Vote)	Tenure on Supreme Court
	Morrison Waite	Chief Justice	Ohio	Salmon P. Chase	January 21, 1874 (63–0)	March 4, 1874 – March 23, 1888 (Died)
	Samuel Freeman Miller	Associate Justice	Iowa	Peter Vivian Daniel	July 16, 1862 (Acclamation)	July 21, 1862 – October 13, 1890 (Died)
	Stephen Johnson Field	Associate Justice	California	newly created seat	March 10, 1863 (Acclamation)	May 10, 1863 – December 1, 1897 (Retired)
	Joseph P. Bradley	Associate Justice	New Jersey	newly created seat	March 21, 1870 (46–9)	March 23, 1870 – January 22, 1892 (Died)
	John Marshall Harlan	Associate Justice	Kentucky	David Davis	November 29, 1877 (Acclamation)	December 10, 1877 – October 14, 1911 (Died)
	William Burnham Woods	Associate Justice	Georgia	William Strong	December 21, 1880 (39–8)	January 5, 1881 – May 14, 1887 (Died)
	Stanley Matthews	Associate Justice	Ohio	Noah Haynes Swayne	May 12, 1881 (24–23)	May 17, 1881 – March 22, 1889 (Died)
	Horace Gray	Associate Justice	Massachusetts	Nathan Clifford	December 20, 1881 (51–5)	January 9, 1882 – September 15, 1902 (Died)
	Samuel Blatchford	Associate Justice	New York	Ward Hunt	March 22, 1882 (Acclamation)	April 3, 1882 – July 7, 1893 (Died)

== Citation style ==
Under the Judiciary Act of 1789 the federal court structure at the time comprised District Courts, which had general trial jurisdiction; Circuit Courts, which had mixed trial and appellate (from the US District Courts) jurisdiction; and the United States Supreme Court, which had appellate jurisdiction over the federal District and Circuit courts—and for certain issues over state courts. The Supreme Court also had limited original jurisdiction (i.e., in which cases could be filed directly with the Supreme Court without first having been heard by a lower federal or state court). There were one or more federal District Courts and/or Circuit Courts in each state, territory, or other geographical region.

Bluebook citation style is used for case names, citations, and jurisdictions.

- "C.C.D." = United States Circuit Court for the District of . . .
  - e.g.,"C.C.D.N.J." = United States Circuit Court for the District of New Jersey
- "D." = United States District Court for the District of . . .
  - e.g.,"D. Mass." = United States District Court for the District of Massachusetts
- "E." = Eastern; "M." = Middle; "N." = Northern; "S." = Southern; "W." = Western
  - e.g.,"C.C.S.D.N.Y." = United States Circuit Court for the Southern District of New York
  - e.g.,"M.D. Ala." = United States District Court for the Middle District of Alabama
- "Ct. Cl." = United States Court of Claims
- The abbreviation of a state's name alone indicates the highest appellate court in that state's judiciary at the time.
  - e.g.,"Pa." = Supreme Court of Pennsylvania
  - e.g.,"Me." = Supreme Judicial Court of Maine

== List of cases in volume 117 U.S. ==
Case Name	Page and year	Opinion of the Court	Concurring opinion(s)	Dissenting opinion(s)	Lower Court	Disposition
St. Louis, Iron Mountain and Southern Railway Company v. Southern Express Company	1 (1886)	Waite	None	Miller, Field	C.C.E.D. Mo.	reversed
Pickard v. Pullman Southern Car Company	34 (1886)	Blatchford	None	None	C.C.M.D. Tenn.	affirmed
Tennessee v. Pullman Southern Car Company	51 (1886)	Blatchford	None	None	C.C.M.D. Tenn.	affirmed
Hagood v. Southern	52 (1886)	Matthews	None	None	C.C.D.S.C.	reversed
Wright v. Kentucky and Great Eastern Railway Company	72 (1886)	Blatchford	None	None	C.C.D. Ky.	affirmed
Leather Manufacturers National Bank v. Morgan	96 (1886)	Harlan	None	None	C.C.S.D.N.Y.	reversed
Chicago and Northwestern Railway Company v. Ohle	123 (1886)	Waite	None	None	C.C.S.D. Iowa	affirmed
Tennessee v. Whitworth	139 (1886)	Waite	None	None	C.C.M.D. Tenn.	affirmed
Van Brocklin v. Tennessee	151 (1886)	Gray	None	None	Tenn.	reversed
Graffam v. Burgess	180 (1886)	Bradley	None	Miller	C.C.D. Mass.	affirmed
Akers v. Akers	197 (1886)	Waite	None	None	C.C.M.D. Tenn.	affirmed
Johnson v. Keith	199 (1886)	Waite	None	None	Mo.	dismissed
Harwood v. Dieckerhoff	200 (1886)	Waite	None	None	not indicated	bond increase denied
Tua v. Carriere	201 (1886)	Woods	None	None	C.C.E.D. La.	affirmed
Patch v. White	210 (1886)	Bradley	None	Woods	Sup. Ct. D.C.	reversed
Barney v. Winona and St. Peter Railroad Company	228 (1886)	Field	None	None	C.C.D. Minn.	reversed
Coffey v. United States	233 (1886)	Blatchford	None	None	C.C.D. Ky.	rehearing denied
Phelps v. Oaks	236 (1886)	Matthews	None	None	C.C.W.D. Mo.	reversed
Ex parte Royall I	241 (1886)	Harlan	None	None	C.C.E.D. Va.	affirmed
Ex parte Royall II	254 (1886)	Harlan	None	None	original	habeas corpus denied
Applegate v. Lexington and Carter County Mining Company	255 (1886)	Woods	None	None	C.C.D. Ky.	reversed
Boardman v. Toffey	271 (1886)	Waite	None	None	C.C.D.N.J.	affirmed
Jefferson v. Driver	272 (1886)	Waite	None	None	C.C.E.D. Ark.	affirmed
W. and J. Sloane v. Anderson	275 (1886)	Waite	None	None	C.C.W.D. Wis.	affirmed
Fidelity Insurance Company v. Huntington	280 (1886)	Waite	None	None	C.C.S.D. Ohio	affirmed
Kleinschmidt v. McAndrews	282 (1886)	Matthews	None	None	Sup. Ct. Terr. Mont.	reversed
Cherokee Trust Funds	288 (1886)	Field	None	None	Ct. Cl.	affirmed
Phoenix Insurance Company v. Erie and Western Transportation Company	312 (1886)	Gray	None	None	C.C.E.D. Wis.	affirmed
Glasgow v. Lipse	327 (1886)	Field	None	None	C.C.W.D. Va.	reversed
New Providence Township v. Halsey	336 (1886)	Waite	None	None	C.C.D.N.J.	reversed
Rand v. Walker	340 (1886)	Waite	None	None	C.C.N.D. Ill.	affirmed
Dunphy v. Sullivan	346 (1886)	Waite	None	None	Sup. Ct. Terr. Mont.	affirmed
Core v. Vinal	347 (1886)	Waite	None	None	C.C.D.W. Va.	affirmed
MacKin v. United States	348 (1886)	Gray	None	None	C.C.N.D. Ill.	certification
Union Pacific Railway Company v. United States	355 (1886)	Matthews	None	None	Ct. Cl.	affirmed
Sturges v. United States	363 (1886)	Waite	None	None	C.C.S.D.N.Y.	reversed
Phoenix Mutual Life Insurance Company v. Walrath	365 (1886)	Waite	None	None	C.C.E.D. Wis.	affirmed
Ex parte Phoenix Insurance Company of London, England	367 (1886)	Waite	None	None	C.C.D. Vt.	mandamus denied
Van Riswick v. Spalding	370 (1886)	Gray	None	None	Sup. Ct. D.C.	affirmed
Yale Lock Manufacturing Company v. Sargent I	373 (1886)	Matthews	None	None	C.C.S.D.N.Y.	reversed
Kerr v. South Park Commissioners	379 (1886)	Matthews	None	None	C.C.N.D. Ill.	affirmed
Fulkerson v. Holmes	389 (1886)	Woods	None	None	C.C.W.D. Va.	affirmed
Hoyt v. Russell	401 (1886)	Field	None	None	Sup. Ct. Terr. Mont.	reversed
Sioux City and St. Paul Railroad Company v. Chicago, Milwaukee and St. Paul Railway Company	406 (1886)	Miller	None	None	C.C.D. Iowa	multiple
Knapp v. Homeopathic Mutual Life Insurance Company	411 (1886)	Gray	None	None	C.C.D. Mass.	affirmed
Marshall v. Hubbard	415 (1886)	Harlan	None	None	C.C.E.D. Wis.	affirmed
Littlefield v. Florida	419 (1886)	Waite	None	None	C.C.N.D. Fla.	affirmed
Stone v. South Carolina	430 (1886)	Waite	None	None	S.C.	affirmed
Union Trust Company v. Illinois Midland Railway Company	434 (1886)	Blatchford	None	None	C.C.S.D. Ill.	multiple
Ferguson v. Arthur	482 (1886)	Blatchford	None	None	C.C.S.D.N.Y.	affirmed
Dingley Brothers v. W.M. Oler and Company	490 (1886)	Matthews	None	None	C.C.D. Me.	reversed
Turpin v. Burgess	504 (1886)	Bradley	None	None	C.C.E.D. Va.	affirmed
Town of Mahomet v. Quackenbush	508 (1886)	Waite	None	None	C.C.S.D. Ill.	affirmed
Bruce v. Manchester and Keene Railroad Company	514 (1886)	Waite	None	None	C.C.D.N.H.	dismissed
Ex parte Fonda	516 (1886)	Waite	None	None	Mich. Cir. Ct.	habeas corpus denied
New York Life Insurance Company v. Fletcher	519 (1886)	Field	None	None	C.C.E.D. Mo.	reversed
Yale Lock Manufacturing Company v. Sargent II	536 (1886)	Blatchford	None	None	C.C.S.D.N.Y.	multiple
Yale Lock Manufacturing Company v. Greenleaf	554 (1886)	Woods	None	None	C.C.S.D.N.Y.	reversed
Dimock v. Revere Copper Company	559 (1886)	Miller	None	None	N.Y.	affirmed
Hobbs v. McLean	567 (1886)	Woods	None	None	C.C.S.D. Iowa	affirmed
Burnes v. Scott	582 (1886)	Woods	None	None	C.C.W.D. Mo.	affirmed
New York Mutual Life Insurance Company v. Armstrong	591 (1886)	Field	None	None	C.C.E.D.N.Y.	reversed
Express Cases	601 (1886)	Waite	None	None	C.C.E.D. Mo.	decrees amended
Alabama v. Montague I	602 (1886)	Miller	None	None	C.C.E.D. Tenn.	affirmed
Alabama v. Montague II	611 (1886)	Miller	None	None	C.C.E.D. Tenn.	affirmed
Stewart v. Virginia	612 (1886)	Waite	None	None	C.C.E.D. Va.	affirmed
Campbell v. District of Columbia	615 (1886)	Waite	None	None	Sup. Ct. D.C.	affirmed
Long v. Bullard	617 (1886)	Waite	None	None	Ga.	affirmed
District of Columbia v. McElligott	621 (1886)	Harlan	None	None	Sup. Ct. D.C.	reversed
Connecticut Mutual Life Insurance Company v. Scammon	634 (1886)	Blatchford	None	None	C.C.N.D. Ill.	multiple
Given v. Wright	648 (1886)	Bradley	None	None	N.J.	affirmed
Daviess County v. Dickinson	657 (1886)	Gray	None	None	C.C.D. Ky.	reversed
Phillips v. Negley	665 (1886)	Matthews	None	None	Sup. Ct. D.C.	reversed
Jackson v. Lawrence	679 (1886)	Woods	None	None	C.C.W.D. Mo.	affirmed
Zeigler v. Hopkins	683 (1886)	Waite	None	None	C.C.D. Cal.	affirmed
Cantrell v. Wallick	689 (1886)	Woods	None	None	C.C.E.D. Pa.	affirmed
