= List of United States Supreme Court cases, volume 194 =

Supreme Court of the United States
- Interactive map of Supreme Court of the United States
- 38°53′26″N 77°00′16″W
- Established: March 4, 1789; 237 years ago
- Location: Washington, D.C.
- Coordinates: 38°53′26″N 77°00′16″W
- Composition method: Presidential nomination with Senate confirmation
- Authorised by: Constitution of the United States, Art. III, § 1
- Judge term length: life tenure, subject to impeachment and removal
- Number of positions: 9 (by statute)
- Website: supremecourt.gov

This is a list of cases reported in volume 194 of United States Reports, decided by the Supreme Court of the United States in 1904.

== Justices of the Supreme Court at the time of volume 194 U.S. ==
The Supreme Court is established by Article III, Section 1 of the Constitution of the United States, which says: "The judicial Power of the United States, shall be vested in one supreme Court . . .". The size of the Court is not specified; the Constitution leaves it to Congress to set the number of justices. Under the Judiciary Act of 1789, Congress originally fixed the number of justices at six (one chief justice and five associate justices). Since 1789, Congress has varied the size of the Court from six to seven, nine, ten, and back to nine justices (always including one chief justice).

When the cases in volume 194 were decided the Court comprised the following nine members:

Portrait	Justice	Office	Home State	Succeeded	Date confirmed by the Senate (Vote)	Tenure on Supreme Court
	Melville Fuller	Chief Justice	Illinois	Morrison Waite	July 20, 1888 (41–20)	October 8, 1888 – July 4, 1910 (Died)
	John Marshall Harlan	Associate Justice	Kentucky	David Davis	November 29, 1877 (Acclamation)	December 10, 1877 – October 14, 1911 (Died)
	David Josiah Brewer	Associate Justice	Kansas	Stanley Matthews	December 18, 1889 (53–11)	January 6, 1890 – March 28, 1910 (Died)
	Henry Billings Brown	Associate Justice	Michigan	Samuel Freeman Miller	December 29, 1890 (Acclamation)	January 5, 1891 – May 28, 1906 (Retired)
	Edward Douglass White	Associate Justice	Louisiana	Samuel Blatchford	February 19, 1894 (Acclamation)	March 12, 1894 – December 18, 1910 (Continued as chief justice)
	Rufus W. Peckham	Associate Justice	New York	Howell Edmunds Jackson	December 9, 1895 (Acclamation)	January 6, 1896 – October 24, 1909 (Died)
	Joseph McKenna	Associate Justice	California	Stephen Johnson Field	January 21, 1898 (Acclamation)	January 26, 1898 – January 5, 1925 (Retired)
	Oliver Wendell Holmes Jr.	Associate Justice	Massachusetts	Horace Gray	December 4, 1902 (Acclamation)	December 8, 1902 – January 12, 1932 (Retired)
	William R. Day	Associate Justice	Ohio	George Shiras Jr.	February 23, 1903 (Acclamation)	March 2, 1903 – November 13, 1922 (Retired)

== Citation style ==
Under the Judiciary Act of 1789, the federal court structure at the time comprised District Courts, which had general trial jurisdiction; Circuit Courts, which had mixed trial and appellate (from the US District Courts) jurisdiction; and the United States Supreme Court, which had appellate jurisdiction over the federal District and Circuit courts—and for certain issues over state courts. The Supreme Court also had limited original jurisdiction (i.e., in which cases could be filed directly with the Supreme Court without first having been heard by a lower federal or state court). There were one or more federal District Courts and/or Circuit Courts in each state, territory, or other geographical region.

The Judiciary Act of 1891, created the United States Courts of Appeals and reassigned the jurisdiction of most routine appeals from the district and circuit courts to these appellate courts. The Act created nine new courts that were originally known as the "United States Circuit Courts of Appeals." The new courts had jurisdiction over most appeals of lower court decisions. The Supreme Court could review either legal issues that a court of appeals certified or decisions of court of appeals by writ of certiorari.

Bluebook citation style is used for case names, citations, and jurisdictions.

- "# Cir." = United States Court of Appeals
  - e.g., "3d Cir." = United States Court of Appeals for the Third Circuit
- "C.C.D." = United States Circuit Court for the District of . . .
  - e.g.,"C.C.D.N.J." = United States Circuit Court for the District of New Jersey
- "D." = United States District Court for the District of . . .
  - e.g.,"D. Mass." = United States District Court for the District of Massachusetts
- "E." = Eastern; "M." = Middle; "N." = Northern; "S." = Southern; "W." = Western
  - e.g.,"C.C.S.D.N.Y." = United States Circuit Court for the Southern District of New York
  - e.g.,"M.D. Ala." = United States District Court for the Middle District of Alabama
- "Ct. Cl." = United States Court of Claims
- The abbreviation of a state's name alone indicates the highest appellate court in that state's judiciary at the time.
  - e.g.,"Pa." = Supreme Court of Pennsylvania
  - e.g.,"Me." = Supreme Judicial Court of Maine

== List of cases in volume 194 U.S. ==
Case Name	Page & year	Opinion of the Court	Concurring opinion(s)	Dissenting opinion(s)	Lower Court	Disposition
People's et al. Co. v. City of Chicago	1 (1904)	Fuller	none	none	C.C.N.D. Ill.	affirmed
Brown v. Schleier	18 (1904)	McKenna	none	none	8th Cir.	affirmed
ICC v. Baird	25 (1904)	Day	none	none	C.C.S.D.N.Y.	reversed
Minnesota v. Northern S. Co.	48 (1904)	Harlan	none	none	C.C.D. Minn.	reversed
Beavers v. Henkel	73 (1904)	Brewer	none	none	C.C.S.D.N.Y.	affirmed
Houghton v. Payne	88 (1904)	Brown	none	Harlan	D.C. Cir.	affirmed
Smith v. Payne	104 (1904)	Brown	none	none	D.C. Cir.	affirmed
Bates & G. Co. v. Payne	106 (1904)	Brown	none	Harlan	D.C. Cir.	affirmed
Pacific E. Ry. Co. v. City of Los Angeles	112 (1904)	McKenna	none	none	C.C.S.D. Cal.	affirmed
Slater v. Mexican N.R.R. Co.	120 (1904)	Holmes	none	Fuller	5th Cir.	affirmed
Southern Ry. Co. v. Carson	136 (1904)	Fuller	none	none	S.C.	affirmed
Kirby v. American S.F. Co.	141 (1904)	Fuller	none	none	C.C.N.D. Tex.	affirmed
Jones v. Montague	147 (1904)	Brewer	none	none	C.C.E.D. Va.	dismissed
Selden v. Montague	153 (1904)	Brewer	none	none	C.C.E.D. Va.	dismissed
Damon v. Hawaii	154 (1904)	Holmes	none	none	Sup. Ct. Terr. Haw.	reversed
United States v. Sing Tuck	161 (1904)	Holmes	none	Brewer	2d Cir.	reversed
Gibson v. United States	182 (1904)	Day	none	none	Ct. Cl.	affirmed
Lowe v. United States	193 (1904)	Day	none	none	Ct. Cl.	affirmed
Ex parte United States	194 (1904)	Fuller	none	none	N.D. Ohio	mandamus granted
City & S. Ry. v. Svedborg	201 (1904)	Harlan	none	none	D.C. Cir.	affirmed
Pettit v. Walshe	205 (1904)	Harlan	none	none	C.C.D. Ind.	affirmed
Clipper M. Co. v. Eli M. & L. Co.	220 (1904)	Brewer	none	none	Colo.	affirmed
St. Louis M. & M. Co. v. Montana M. Co.	235 (1904)	Brewer	none	none	9th Cir.	affirmed
The Iroquois	240 (1904)	Brown	none	none	9th Cir.	affirmed
Elder v. Horseshoe M. & M. Co.	248 (1904)	Peckham	none	none	S.D.	affirmed
West v. Louisiana	258 (1904)	Peckham	none	none	La.	affirmed
Missouri et al. Ry. Co. v. May	267 (1904)	Holmes	none	Brown	Bell Cnty. Ct.	affirmed
Raphael v. Trask	272 (1904)	Day	none	none	C.C.S.D.N.Y.	affirmed
United States ex rel. Turner v. Williams	279 (1904)	Fuller	Brewer	none	C.C.S.D.N.Y.	affirmed
Hewit v. Berlin M. Works	296 (1904)	Fuller	none	none	2d Cir.	affirmed
Hanks D. Ass'n v. International T.C. Co.	303 (1904)	Fuller	none	none	2d Cir.	certification
Plymouth C. Co. v. Smith	311 (1904)	Fuller	none	none	8th Cir.	certification
Ribas y Hijo v. United States	315 (1904)	Harlan	none	none	D.P.R.	affirmed
Bessette v. W.B. Conkey Co.	324 (1904)	Brewer	none	none	7th Cir.	certification
Northern P. Ry. Co. v. Dixon	338 (1904)	Brewer	none	White	8th Cir.	certification
Filhiol v. Torney	356 (1904)	Brewer	none	none	C.C.E.D. Ark.	affirmed
Fischer v. City of St Louis	361 (1904)	Brown	none	none	Mo.	affirmed
United States ex rel. Holzendorf v. Hay	373 (1904)	White	none	none	D.C. Cir.	dismissed
Sun P. & P. Ass'n v. Edwards	377 (1904)	White	none	none	2d Cir.	certification
Morris v. Hitchcock	384 (1904)	White	none	none	D.C. Cir.	affirmed
United States v. Anderson	394 (1904)	White	none	none	Ct. Cl.	affirmed
Hy-Yu-Tse-Mil-Kin v. Smith	401 (1904)	Peckham	none	none	9th Cir.	affirmed
Hooker v. Burr	415 (1904)	Peckham	none	none	Cal.	affirmed
Cau v. Texas & P. Ry. Co.	427 (1904)	McKenna	none	none	5th Cir.	affirmed
Charnock v. Texas & P. Ry. Co.	432 (1904)	McKenna	none	none	5th Cir.	affirmed
Swarts v. Hammer	441 (1904)	McKenna	none	none	8th Cir.	affirmed
Ohio ex rel. Lloyd v. Dollison	445 (1904)	McKenna	none	none	Ohio	affirmed
Davis v. Mills	451 (1904)	Holmes	none	none	2d Cir.	certification
In re Christensen E. Co.	458 (1904)	Fuller	none	none	2d Cir.	mandamus granted
Crowley v. United States	461 (1904)	Harlan	none	none	D.P.R.	reversed
Knepper v. Sands	476 (1904)	Harlan	none	none	8th Cir.	certification
Binns v. United States	486 (1904)	Brewer	none	none	D. Alaska	affirmed
Wynn-Johnson v. Shoup	496 (1904)	Brewer	none	none	D. Alaska	affirmed
Public C. House v. Coyne	497 (1904)	Brown	none	none	C.C.N.D. Ill.	affirmed
City of Cleveland v. Cleveland C. Ry. Co.	517 (1904)	White	none	none	C.C.N.D. Ohio	affirmed
City of Cleveland v. Cleveland E. Ry. Co.	538 (1904)	White	none	none	C.C.N.D. Ohio	affirmed
Dimmick v. Tompkins	540 (1904)	Peckham	none	none	C.C.N.D. Cal.	affirmed
Shepard v. Barron	553 (1904)	Peckham	none	none	C.C.S.D. Ohio	affirmed
Burrell v. Montana	572 (1904)	McKenna	none	none	Mont.	affirmed
Terre Haute & I.R.R. Co. v. Indiana ex rel. Ketcham	579 (1904)	Holmes	none	none	Ind.	reversed
Chandler v. Dix	590 (1904)	Holmes	none	none	C.C.E.D. Mich.	affirmed
Shaw v. City of Covington	593 (1904)	Holmes	none	none	C.C.E.D. Ky.	affirmed
International P.S. Co. v. Bruce	601 (1904)	Holmes	none	Harlan	2d Cir.	certification
Field v. Barber A.P. Co.	618 (1904)	Day	none	none	C.C.W.D. Mo.	multiple
Rawson v. Western S.B. Co.	627 (1904)	Harlan	none	none	C.C.N.D. Ill.	affirmed

== See also ==
- Certificate of division
