= List of United States Supreme Court cases, volume 107 =

Supreme Court of the United States
- Interactive map of Supreme Court of the United States
- 38°53′26″N 77°00′16″W
- Established: March 4, 1789; 236 years ago
- Location: Washington, D.C.
- Coordinates: 38°53′26″N 77°00′16″W
- Composition method: Presidential nomination with Senate confirmation
- Authorised by: Constitution of the United States, Art. III, § 1
- Judge term length: life tenure, subject to impeachment and removal
- Number of positions: 9 (by statute)
- Website: supremecourt.gov

This is a list of cases reported in volume 107 of United States Reports, decided by the Supreme Court of the United States in 1883, along with one case from 1882.

== Justices of the Supreme Court at the time of volume 107 U.S. ==
The Supreme Court is established by Article III, Section 1 of the Constitution of the United States, which says: "The judicial Power of the United States, shall be vested in one supreme Court . . .". The size of the Court is not specified; the Constitution leaves it to Congress to set the number of justices. Under the Judiciary Act of 1789 Congress originally fixed the number of justices at six (one chief justice and five associate justices). Since 1789 Congress has varied the size of the Court from six to seven, nine, ten, and back to nine justices (always including one chief justice).

When the cases in volume 107 U.S. were decided the Court comprised the following nine members:

Portrait	Justice	Office	Home State	Succeeded	Date confirmed by the Senate (Vote)	Tenure on Supreme Court
	Morrison Waite	Chief Justice	Ohio	Salmon P. Chase	January 21, 1874 (63–0)	March 4, 1874 – March 23, 1888 (Died)
	Samuel Freeman Miller	Associate Justice	Iowa	Peter Vivian Daniel	July 16, 1862 (Acclamation)	July 21, 1862 – October 13, 1890 (Died)
	Stephen Johnson Field	Associate Justice	California	newly created seat	March 10, 1863 (Acclamation)	May 10, 1863 – December 1, 1897 (Retired)
	Joseph P. Bradley	Associate Justice	New Jersey	newly created seat	March 21, 1870 (46–9)	March 23, 1870 – January 22, 1892 (Died)
	John Marshall Harlan	Associate Justice	Kentucky	David Davis	November 29, 1877 (Acclamation)	December 10, 1877 – October 14, 1911 (Died)
	William Burnham Woods	Associate Justice	Georgia	William Strong	December 21, 1880 (39–8)	January 5, 1881 – May 14, 1887 (Died)
	Stanley Matthews	Associate Justice	Ohio	Noah Haynes Swayne	May 12, 1881 (24–23)	May 17, 1881 – March 22, 1889 (Died)
	Horace Gray	Associate Justice	Massachusetts	Nathan Clifford	December 20, 1881 (51–5)	January 9, 1882 – September 15, 1902 (Died)
	Samuel Blatchford	Associate Justice	New York	Ward Hunt	March 22, 1882 (Acclamation)	April 3, 1882 – July 7, 1893 (Died)

== Citation style ==
Under the Judiciary Act of 1789 the federal court structure at the time comprised District Courts, which had general trial jurisdiction; Circuit Courts, which had mixed trial and appellate (from the US District Courts) jurisdiction; and the United States Supreme Court, which had appellate jurisdiction over the federal District and Circuit courts—and for certain issues over state courts. The Supreme Court also had limited original jurisdiction (i.e., in which cases could be filed directly with the Supreme Court without first having been heard by a lower federal or state court). There were one or more federal District Courts and/or Circuit Courts in each state, territory, or other geographical region.

Bluebook citation style is used for case names, citations, and jurisdictions.

- "C.C.D." = United States Circuit Court for the District of . . .
  - e.g.,"C.C.D.N.J." = United States Circuit Court for the District of New Jersey
- "D." = United States District Court for the District of . . .
  - e.g.,"D. Mass." = United States District Court for the District of Massachusetts
- "E." = Eastern; "M." = Middle; "N." = Northern; "S." = Southern; "W." = Western
  - e.g.,"C.C.S.D.N.Y." = United States Circuit Court for the Southern District of New York
  - e.g.,"M.D. Ala." = United States District Court for the Middle District of Alabama
- "Ct. Cl." = United States Court of Claims
- The abbreviation of a state's name alone indicates the highest appellate court in that state's judiciary at the time.
  - e.g.,"Pa." = Supreme Court of Pennsylvania
  - e.g.,"Me." = Supreme Judicial Court of Maine

== List of cases in volume 107 U.S. ==
Case Name	Page & year	Opinion of the Court	Concurring opinion(s)	Dissenting opinion(s)	Lower Court	Disposition
United States v. Erie Railroad Company	1 (1883)	Waite	none	none	C.C.S.D.N.Y.	rehearing denied
Embry v. Palmer	3 (1883)	Matthews	none	none	Conn.	reversed
Burgess v. J. & W. Seligman and Company	20 (1883)	Bradley	none	none	C.C.E.D. Mo.	affirmed
Turner v. Maryland	38 (1883)	Blatchford	none	none	Md.	affirmed
New York v. Compagnie Générale Transatlantique	59 (1883)	Miller	none	none	C.C.S.D.N.Y.	affirmed
United States ex rel. Burnett v. Teller	64 (1883)	Woods	none	none	Sup. Ct. D.C.	affirmed
Cushing v. Laird	69 (1883)	Gray	none	none	C.C.S.D.N.Y.	affirmed
Schmidt v. Badger	85 (1883)	Blatchford	none	none	C.C.S.D. La.	affirmed
Hall v. Macneale	90 (1883)	Blatchford	none	none	C.C.S.D. Ohio	affirmed
Green Bay and Minnesota Railroad Company v. Union Steamboat Company	98 (1883)	Gray	none	none	C.C.W.D. Wis.	affirmed
Michigan Central Railroad Company v. Myrick	102 (1883)	Field	none	none	C.C.N.D. Ill.	reversed
Bush v. Kentucky	110 (1883)	Harlan	none	Field; Waite	Ky.	reversed
Kendall v. United States	123 (1883)	Harlan	none	none	Ct. Cl.	affirmed
Potter v. United States	126 (1883)	Woods	none	none	C.C.D. Minn.	affirmed
Hoffheins v. Russell	132 (1883)	Blatchford	none	none	C.C.N.D. Ohio	affirmed
Montclair Township v. Ramsdell	147 (1883)	Harlan	none	none	C.C.D.N.J.	affirmed
Montclair Township v. Dana	162 (1883)	Harlan	none	none	C.C.D.N.J.	affirmed
Russell v. Allen	163 (1883)	Gray	none	none	C.C.E.D. Mo.	affirmed
Jones v. Habersham	174 (1883)	Gray	none	none	C.C.S.D. Ga.	affirmed
Atlantic Works v. Brady	192 (1883)	Bradley	none	none	C.C.D. Mass.	reversed
New York G. & I. Co. v. Memphis Water Company	205 (1883)	Bradley	none	none	C.C.W.D. Tenn.	affirmed
Cotzhausen v. Nazro	215 (1883)	Miller	none	none	C.C.E.D. Wis.	affirmed
Kring v. Missouri	221 (1883)	Miller	none	Matthews	Mo.	reversed
Bowden v. Johnson	251 (1883)	Blatchford	none	none	C.C.D.N.J.	reversed
Ex parte Wall	265 (1883)	Bradley	none	Field	C.C.S.D. Fla.	mandamus denied
Roth v. Ehman	319 (1883)	Waite	none	none	Ill.	dismissed
United States v. Phelps Brothers and Company	320 (1883)	Waite	none	none	C.C.S.D.N.Y.	affirmed
Tredway v. Sanger	323 (1883)	Waite	none	none	C.C.D. Cal.	affirmed
Standard Oil Company v. Van Etten	325 (1882)	Matthews	none	none	C.C.E.D. Mich.	affirmed
Missionary Society v. City of The Dalles	336 (1883)	Woods	none	none	C.C.D. Or.	affirmed
Missionary Society v. Kelly	347 (1883)	per curiam	none	none	C.C.D. Or.	affirmed
Chapman v. Douglas County	348 (1883)	Matthews	none	none	C.C.D. Neb.	reversed
Jaffray v. McGehee	361 (1883)	Woods	none	none	C.C.E.D. Ark.	affirmed
Wiggins Ferry Company v. City of East St. Louis	365 (1883)	Woods	none	none	Ill.	affirmed
Kountze v Omaha Hotel Company	378 (1883)	Bradley	none	Miller	C.C.D. Neb.	reversed
Hahn v. United States	402 (1883)	Blatchford	none	none	Ct. Cl.	affirmed
Campbell v. United States	407 (1883)	Miller	none	none	Ct. Cl.	remanded
Wood v. United States	414 (1883)	Blatchford	none	none	Ct. Cl.	affirmed
The Julia Blake	418 (1883)	Waite	none	none	C.C.S.D.N.Y.	affirmed
Allen v. McVeigh	433 (1883)	Waite	none	none	Va.	affirmed
Merriam v. United States	437 (1883)	Woods	none	none	Ct. Cl.	affirmed
Cook County National Bank v. United States	445 (1883)	Field	none	none	C.C.N.D. Ill.	reversed
Wabash Railroad Company v. McDaniels	454 (1883)	Harlan	none	none	C.C.D. Ind.	affirmed
Baldwin v. Starks	463 (1883)	Miller	none	none	Neb.	reversed
Close v. Glenwood Cemetery Company	466 (1883)	Gray	none	none	Sup. Ct. D.C.	affirmed
Williams v. Jackson	478 (1883)	Gray	none	none	Sup. Ct. D.C.	reversed
Sun Mutual Insurance Company v. Ocean Insurance Company	485 (1883)	Matthews	none	Miller	C.C.S.D.N.Y.	reversed
The Adriatic	512 (1883)	Field	none	none	C.C.S.D.N.Y.	affirmed
District of Columbia v. Armes	519 (1883)	Field	none	none	Sup. Ct. D.C.	affirmed
McLaughlin v. United States	526 (1883)	Miller	none	none	C.C.D. Cal.	affirmed
Town of Pana v. Bowler	529 (1883)	Woods	none	none	C.C.S.D. Ill.	affirmed
Myers v. Swann	546 (1883)	Waite	none	none	C.C.E.D.N.C.	affirmed
City of Quincy v. Cooke	549 (1883)	Harlan	none	none	C.C.S.D. Ill.	affirmed
Mills County v. Burlington and Missouri River Railroad Company	557 (1883)	Bradley	none	none	Iowa	affirmed
Read v. City of Plattsmouth	568 (1883)	Matthews	none	none	C.C.D. Neb.	reversed
Memphis and Charleston Railroad Company v. Alabama	581 (1883)	Gray	none	none	C.C.N.D. Ala.	affirmed
Ambler v. Choteau	586 (1883)	Waite	none	none	C.C.E.D. Mo.	affirmed
Union Trust Company of New York v. E.E. Souther and Brother	591 (1883)	Waite	none	none	C.C.S.D. Ill.	affirmed
Union Trust Company of New York v. Walker	596 (1883)	Waite	none	none	C.C.S.D. Ill.	affirmed
Davis v. South Carolina	597 (1883)	Matthews	none	none	S.C.	reversed
Basket v. Hassell	602 (1883)	Matthews	none	none	C.C.D. Ind.	affirmed
Barber v. Schell	617 (1883)	Blatchford	none	none	C.C.S.D.N.Y.	affirmed
Schell v. Cochran	625 (1883)	Blatchford	none	none	C.C.S.D.N.Y.	modification denied
Schell v. Dodge	629 (1883)	Blatchford	none	none	C.C.S.D.N.Y.	affirmance denied
Hill v. Harding	631 (1883)	Gray	none	none	Ill.	reversed
Duff v. Sterling Pump Company	636 (1883)	Blatchford	none	none	C.C.N.D. Ill.	affirmed
Gage v. Herring	640 (1883)	Gray	none	none	C.C.N.D.N.Y.	reversed
Slawson v. Grand Street Railroad Company	649 (1883)	Woods	none	none	C.C.E.D.N.Y.	affirmed
United States v. Britton	655 (1883)	Woods	none	none	C.C.E.D. Mo.	certification
United States v. Curtis	671 (1883)	Harlan	none	none	C.C.E.D. Mo.	certification
First National Bank of Xenia v. Stewart	676 (1883)	Field	none	none	C.C.S.D. Ohio	reversed
Escanaba and Lake Michigan Transportation Company v. City of Chicago	678 (1883)	Field	none	none	C.C.N.D. Ill.	affirmed
Parkersburg O.R. Transportation Company v. City of Parkersburg	691 (1883)	Bradley	none	Harlan	C.C.D.W. Va.	affirmed
Louisiana v. Jumel	711 (1883)	Waite	none	Field; Harlan	C.C.E.D. La.	affirmed
Antoni v. Greenhow	769 (1883)	Waite	Matthews	Field; Harlan	Va.	affirmed
