= Collector v. Day =

- Supreme Court of the United States

Argued February 3, 1871 Decided April 3, 1871
- Full case name: The Collector v. Day
- Citations: 78 U.S. 113 (more) 11 Wall. 113; 20 L. Ed. 122; 1870 U.S. LEXIS 1463; 2 A.F.T.R. (P-H) 2253

Holding
- Congress did not have the right within their powers to impose a tax on state officials.

Court membership
- Chief Justice Salmon P. Chase Associate Justices Samuel Nelson · Nathan Clifford; Noah H. Swayne · Samuel F. Miller; David Davis · Stephen J. Field; William Strong · Joseph P. Bradley

Case opinions
- Majority: Nelson, joined by Chase, Clifford, Swayne, Miller, Davis, Field, Strong
- Dissent: Bradley
- Superseded by
- Graves v. New York (1939)

Collector v. Day, 78 U.S. (11 Wall.) 113 (1871), was a United States Supreme Court case that questioned the United States Federal government's ability to impose a tax upon the "salary of a judicial officer of the State." Even though this particular case favors state employees' rights, it was overruled in 1939 by Graves v. New York, where the Supreme Court ruled that the income tax imposed by the State of New York on an employee of the Federal Home Owners Load Corporation was constitutional, since there was no requirement of immunity contained in the Constitution or in any act of Congress. Collector is still important to discussions of constitutional law because of Judge Nelson's statement of the doctrine of dual federalism in the case's opinion.

== Background ==
In 1864, various statutes passed by the United States Congress imposed a 5 percent tax on all personal incomes over $1000. In 1866 and 1867, the tax collector for the internal revenue of the United States taxed Judge J.M. Day of the Court of Probate in Massachusetts. Since Judge Day believed this was not within the federal government's rights, he paid the amount of $61.50 under protest and then proceeded to sue the Circuit Court to recover his charges. After Day won this case, the United States issued a writ of error which brought the case to the Supreme Court of the United States.

== Arguments ==
The plaintiff's main argument, in this case the Collector, claimed that the Federal Government of the United States is supreme in the area of taxation given to them in the U.S. Constitution. Specifically, they cite this right in the Constitution, "Under the general rules of taxation, every man and everything throughout the country (exports excepted) are subject to taxation in the discretion of Congress..." They argued that since the Judge works for his own salary from the state, but as a citizen of the United States, Judge Day should pay his taxes to support the Federal government. They believed that just because he worked for the state, he should not be exempted from his duties as an American citizen.

Judge J.M. Day, the county probate judge of Massachusetts, argued that the Federal government is stretching their limits by taxing an officer of the State. He claimed that these powers are not expressly given to them in the Constitution, and that the Collector is ultimately violating State power.

== Supreme Court decision ==
Decided on April 3, 1871, in an 8 to 1 decision, the Supreme Court decided in favor of the Defendant, Judge Day. Justice Samuel Nelson delivered the opinion of the court and cites several court cases from the past, including McCulloch v. Maryland, Dobbins v. The Commission of Erie County, and Weston v. Charleston. Justice Nelson uses these examples to highlights the examples of federalism v. states powers. In his opinion, Nelson makes very clear that the national and state governments are part of one another but remain as "separate and distinct sovereignties, acting separately and independently of each other, within their respective spheres". He makes his opinion stronger by stating that since it is already in the Constitution that that state may not tax the national government, then it should be the same way that the Federal government may not hinder upon state taxes. Justice Nelson refers to this action as the doctrine of "reciprocal immunity."

In the dissenting opinion delivered by Justice Bradley, he claims that he sees no distinct difference between the national government and the state government taxing the officials of the state. He claims that since every citizen living in a state is in fact a part of the United States, the national government has the ability to tax the officials of the states. Justice Bradley does not agree with the defendant's idea that being an official of a particular state makes him exempt from the federal law. He believes that if the court gives the states this right of taxing their own officials, then what would stop them from furthering their powers? He sees the gray line that this decision could bring about.
