= Canton Railroad Co. v. Rogan =

Canton R. Co. v. Rogan
- Supreme Court of the United States

Argued November 28–29, 1950 Decided February 26, 1951
- Full case name: Canton Railroad Co. v. Rogan, et al., constituting the State Tax Commission of Maryland
- Citations: 340 U.S. 511 (more) 71 S. Ct. 447; 95 L. Ed. 488; 1951 U.S. LEXIS 2363; 20 A.L.R.2d 145

Case history
- Prior: 195 Md. 206, 73 A.2d 12 (1950)

Holding
- A state franchise tax assessed on gross receipts on a railroad's receipts for services in handling imports and exports at a marine terminal did not violate the Import-Export or Commerce Clauses of the Constitution.

Court membership
- Chief Justice Fred M. Vinson Associate Justices Hugo Black · Stanley F. Reed; Felix Frankfurter · William O. Douglas; Robert H. Jackson · Harold H. Burton; Tom C. Clark · Sherman Minton

Case opinions
- Majority: Douglas, joined by Black, Reed, Burton, Clark, Minton
- Dissent: Jackson, joined by Frankfurter
- Vinson took no part in the consideration or decision of the case.

Laws applied
- Md. Ann. Code, Art. 81, §§ 94½ and 95 (1943); U.S. Constitution Art. I, § 10, cl. 2.

Canton Railroad Company v. Rogan, 340 U.S. 511 (1951), is a case in which the United States Supreme Court held that a state franchise tax upon the services performed by a railroad in handling imported and exported goods did not violate the Import-Export Clause of the United States Constitution.

== Background ==
The Canton Railroad is an industrial switching railroad operating in the port area of Baltimore, Maryland. The State of Maryland imposed a franchise tax on the gross receipts of the railroad, apportioned based upon the percentage of the railroad trackage located within the state. A substantial portion of the freight handled by the Canton Railroad involved goods that were either being imported or exported into the United States. Canton Railroad for the tax year of 1946 claimed that $705,957.21 of its total receipts of $1,588,744.48 should be exempt from taxation because they were derived from operations in foreign commerce. The State Tax Commission rejected the railroad's claim of exemption, and imposed a tax of $39,029.34.

Canton Railroad appealed the State Tax Commission to the Baltimore City Circuit Court and then to the Court of Appeals of Maryland. The Court of Appeals upheld the imposition of the tax with two judges dissenting.

== Court's decision ==
The majority opinion by Justice Douglas first noted that the Import-Export Clause of the Constitution of Article One, Section 10, Clause 2 provides that

No State shall, without the Consent of the Congress, lay any Imposts or Duties on Imports or Exports, except what may be absolutely necessary for executing its inspection Laws ...

The opinion then noted that the franchise tax was not similar to those state taxes the Supreme Court had struck down in cases that had taxed goods being exported or imported, in that this tax was a general tax on revenues from the handling of the goods and not on the goods themselves. The opinion held that to import or export involve acts that begin and end at the water's edge (country's border), and that to use the railroad's argument that it was involved in exporting and importing would create a zone of tax immunity covering nearly every forest, mine, and factory in the country. For this reasoning, the Court held that the Maryland franchise tax did not violate the Import-Export Clause. Lastly, regarding a claim that the tax violated the Commerce Clause, the Court noted that prior cases had already held that a state franchise tax structured in this manner did not violate this clause.

The dissent by Justice Jackson, styled as an opinion reserving judgment on the case, discussed the history of the Import-Export Clause as one of the fundamental policies imbedded in the Constitution. The constitutional concern was that states with ports and their associated roads would exploit this advantage, causing inland states to pay tribute to the seaboard states for the privilege of exportation. The dissent considered this federal policy to go beyond simple direct taxation on goods, and that Maryland's franchise tax had the effect of directly increasing the cost of exports. However, the dissent noted that the effect of the federal policy on the validity of the state tax was not addressed before the state courts or by the railroad company's counsel before the Supreme Court, so the Justice did not wish to express a final view on this matter. This dissenting opinion was also to apply to the companion case decided on the same day, Western Maryland R. Co. v. Rogan, 340 U.S. 520 (1951).

Chief Justice Vinson did not take part in the consideration or decision of the case.

== Subsequent developments ==
The holding of Canton Railroad was reaffirmed when it was cited in both the majority and dissenting opinions in United States v. International Business Machines Corp., 517 U.S. 843 (1996), a case involving a federal tax on the insurance coverage of goods to be exported.

The Maryland franchise tax has been recodified at Section 8-101 and 8-102 of the Tax-General Article of the Annotated Code of Maryland.
