= List of United States Supreme Court cases, volume 90 =

Supreme Court of the United States
- Interactive map of Supreme Court of the United States
- 38°53′26″N 77°00′16″W
- Established: March 4, 1789; 236 years ago
- Location: Washington, D.C.
- Coordinates: 38°53′26″N 77°00′16″W
- Composition method: Presidential nomination with Senate confirmation
- Authorised by: Constitution of the United States, Art. III, § 1
- Judge term length: life tenure, subject to impeachment and removal
- Number of positions: 9 (by statute)
- Website: supremecourt.gov

This is a list of cases reported in volume 90 (23 Wall.) of United States Reports, decided by the Supreme Court of the United States in 1874 and 1875.

== Nominative reports ==
In 1874, the U.S. government created the United States Reports, and retroactively numbered older privately published case reports as part of the new series. As a result, cases appearing in volumes 1–90 of U.S. Reports have dual citation forms; one for the volume number of U.S. Reports, and one for the volume number of the reports named for the relevant reporter of decisions (these are called "nominative reports").

=== John William Wallace ===
Starting with the 66th volume of U.S. Reports, the Reporter of Decisions of the Supreme Court of the United States was John William Wallace. Wallace was Reporter of Decisions from 1863 to 1874, covering volumes 68 through 90 of United States Reports which correspond to volumes 1 through 23 of his Wallace's Reports. As such, the dual form of citation to, for example, Fashnacht v. Frank is 90 U.S. (23 Wall.) 416 (1875).

Wallace's Reports were the final nominative reports for the US Supreme Court; starting with volume 91, cases were identified simply as "(volume #) U.S. (page #) (year)".

== Justices of the Supreme Court at the time of 90 U.S. (23 Wall.) ==
The Supreme Court is established by Article III, Section 1 of the Constitution of the United States, which says: "The judicial Power of the United States, shall be vested in one supreme Court . . .". The size of the Court is not specified; the Constitution leaves it to Congress to set the number of justices. Under the Judiciary Act of 1789 Congress originally fixed the number of justices at six (one chief justice and five associate justices). Since 1789 Congress has varied the size of the Court from six to seven, nine, ten, and back to nine justices (always including one chief justice).

When the cases in 90 U.S. (23 Wall.) were decided the Court comprised the following nine members:

Portrait	Justice	Office	Home State	Succeeded	Date confirmed by the Senate (Vote)	Tenure on Supreme Court
	Morrison Waite	Chief Justice	Ohio	Salmon P. Chase	January 21, 1874 (63–0)	March 4, 1874 – March 23, 1888 (Died)
	Nathan Clifford	Associate Justice	Maine	Benjamin Robbins Curtis	January 12, 1858 (26–23)	January 21, 1858 – July 25, 1881 (Died)
	Noah Haynes Swayne	Associate Justice	Ohio	John McLean	January 24, 1862 (38–1)	January 27, 1862 – January 24, 1881 (Retired)
	Samuel Freeman Miller	Associate Justice	Iowa	Peter Vivian Daniel	July 16, 1862 (Acclamation)	July 21, 1862 – October 13, 1890 (Died)
	David Davis	Associate Justice	Illinois	John Archibald Campbell	December 8, 1862 (Acclamation)	December 10, 1862 – March 4, 1877 (Resigned)
	Stephen Johnson Field	Associate Justice	California	newly created seat	March 10, 1863 (Acclamation)	May 10, 1863 – December 1, 1897 (Retired)
	William Strong	Associate Justice	Pennsylvania	Robert Cooper Grier	February 18, 1870 (No vote recorded)	March 14, 1870 – December 14, 1880 (Retired)
	Joseph P. Bradley	Associate Justice	New Jersey	newly created seat	March 21, 1870 (46–9)	March 23, 1870 – January 22, 1892 (Died)
	Ward Hunt	Associate Justice	New York	Samuel Nelson	December 11, 1872 (Acclamation)	January 9, 1873 – January 27, 1882 (Retired)

== Citation style ==
Under the Judiciary Act of 1789 the federal court structure at the time comprised District Courts, which had general trial jurisdiction; Circuit Courts, which had mixed trial and appellate (from the US District Courts) jurisdiction; and the United States Supreme Court, which had appellate jurisdiction over the federal District and Circuit courts—and for certain issues over state courts. The Supreme Court also had limited original jurisdiction (i.e., in which cases could be filed directly with the Supreme Court without first having been heard by a lower federal or state court). There were one or more federal District Courts and/or Circuit Courts in each state, territory, or other geographical region.

Bluebook citation style is used for case names, citations, and jurisdictions.

- "C.C.D." = United States Circuit Court for the District of . . .
  - e.g.,"C.C.D.N.J." = United States Circuit Court for the District of New Jersey
- "D." = United States District Court for the District of . . .
  - e.g.,"D. Mass." = United States District Court for the District of Massachusetts
- "E." = Eastern; "M." = Middle; "N." = Northern; "S." = Southern; "W." = Western
  - e.g.,"C.C.S.D.N.Y." = United States Circuit Court for the Southern District of New York
  - e.g.,"M.D. Ala." = United States District Court for the Middle District of Alabama
- "Ct. Cl." = United States Court of Claims
- The abbreviation of a state's name alone indicates the highest appellate court in that state's judiciary at the time.
  - e.g.,"Pa." = Supreme Court of Pennsylvania
  - e.g.,"Me." = Supreme Judicial Court of Maine

== List of cases in 90 U.S. (23 Wall.) ==
Case Name	Page & year	Opinion of the Court	Concurring opinion(s)	Dissenting opinion(s)	Lower court	Disposition
The Clarita	1 (1875)	Clifford	none	none	C.C.S.D.N.Y.	affirmed (both cases)
The Great Republic	20 (1874)	Davis	none	none	C.C.D. La.	reversed
United States v. Villalonga	35 (1874)	Strong	none	none	Ct. Cl.	reversed
St. Clair County v. Lovingston	46 (1874)	Swayne	none	none	Ill.	affirmed
The Dexter	69 (1875)	Clifford	none	none	C.C.D. Md.	affirmed
The Teutonia	77 (1874)	Clifford	none	none	C.C.D. La.	reversed
Mutual Life Insurance Company v. Young's Administrator	85 (1875)	Swayne	none	none	C.C.D. Cal.	reversed
Secombe v. Milwaukee and St. Paul Railroad Company	108 (1874)	Davis	none	none	C.C.D. Minn.	affirmed
Lewis v. Hawkins	119 (1875)	Swayne	none	none	C.C.W.D. Ark.	reversed
Ray v. Norseworthy	128 (1875)	Clifford	none	none	La.	affirmed
Randall v. Kreiger	137 (1875)	Swayne	none	none	C.C.D. Minn.	affirmed
Stickney v. Wilt	150 (1874)	Clifford	none	none	C.C.N.D. Ohio	reversed
The Sea Gull	165 (1875)	Clifford	none	none	C.C.D. Md.	reversed
Corn-Planter Patent	181 (1874)	Bradley	none	Clifford	C.C.N.D. Ill.	reversed
Arthur v. Richards	246 (1875)	Bradley	none	none	C.C.S.D.N.Y.	reversed
Mason v. Graham	261 (1875)	Strong	none	none	C.C.D. Mass.	reversed
Ambler v. Whipple	278 (1875)	Miller	none	none	Sup. Ct. D.C.	rehearing denied
Thomas and Company v. Wooldridge	283 (1875)	Waite	none	none	C.C.S.D. Miss.	dismissed
Sandusky v. First National Bank	289 (1875)	Waite	none	none	C.C.S.D. Ill.	dismissed
Gregory v. McVeigh	294 (1875)	Waite	none	none	Alexandria Corp. Ct.	dismissal denied
Blake v. National Banks	307 (1875)	Hunt	none	none	C.C.S.D.N.Y.	reversed
Slack v. Tucker and Company	321 (1875)	Bradley	none	Field	C.C.D. Mass.	reversed
Scholey v. Rew	331 (1875)	Clifford	none	none	C.C.N.D.N.Y.	affirmed
Reedy v. Scott	352 (1875)	Clifford	none	none	C.C.S.D. Ohio	affirmed
Smith v. Adsit	368 (1875)	Strong	none	none	Ill.	dismissed
Smythe v. Fiske	374 (1874)	Swayne	none	none	C.C.S.D.N.Y.	reversed
Donovan v. United States	383 (1875)	Clifford	none	none	C.C.E.D. Mo.	affirmed
North Carolina Railroad Company v. Swasey	405 (1875)	Waite	none	none	C.C.E.D.N.C.	dismissed
United States v. Williamson	411 (1875)	Hunt	none	none	Ct. Cl.	affirmed
Fashnacht v. Frank	416 (1875)	Waite	none	none	La.	dismissed
Crosby v. Buchanan	420 (1875)	Waite	none	none	C.C.W.D. Va.	reversed
The Rio Grande	458 (1875)	Hunt	none	none	C.C.D. La.	affirmed
Lewis v. Cocks	466 (1874)	Swayne	none	none	C.C.D. La.	reversed
Grand Tower Company v. Phillips	471 (1874)	Bradley	none	none	C.C.S.D. Ill.	reversed
Hepburn v. School Directors	480 (1875)	Waite	none	none	Pa.	affirmed
Green v. Green	486 (1874)	Hunt	none	none	Sup. Ct. D.C.	affirmed
Moran v. Prather	492 (1875)	Clifford	none	none	C.C.D. La.	affirmed
Ex parte Medway	504 (1875)	Waite	none	none	Ct. Cl.	mandamus denied
Chicago and Alton Railroad Company v. Wiswall	507 (1875)	Waite	none	none	C.C.S.D. Ill.	dismissed
United States v. Shrewsbury	508 (1874)	Swayne	none	none	Ct. Cl.	reversed
Tremolo Patent	518 (1875)	Strong	none	none	C.C.S.D.N.Y.	affirmed
Union Paper Collar Company v. Van Dusen	530 (1875)	Clifford	none	none	C.C.S.D.N.Y.	affirmed
Wood-Paper Patent	566 (1874)	Strong	none	none	C.C.E.D.N.Y.	affirmed
