= United States v. Kahriger =

- Supreme Court of the United States

Argued December 16–17, 1952 Decided March 9, 1953
- Full case name: United States v. Kahriger
- Citations: 345 U.S. 22 (more) 73 S. Ct. 510; 97 L. Ed. 754; 1953 U.S. LEXIS 2699; 53-1 U.S. Tax Cas. (CCH) ¶ 9245; 43 A.F.T.R. (P-H) 93; 1953-1 C.B. 456

Case history
- Prior: Motion to dismiss granted, 105 F. Supp. 322 (E.D. Pa. 1952)
- Subsequent: Rehearing denied, 345 U.S. 931 (1953); on remand, 210 F.2d 565 (3d Cir. 1954).

Holding
- The federal occupational tax on persons engaged in the business of accepting wagers under the 1951 Revenue Act was constitutional.

Court membership
- Chief Justice Fred M. Vinson Associate Justices Hugo Black · Stanley F. Reed; Felix Frankfurter · William O. Douglas; Robert H. Jackson · Harold H. Burton; Tom C. Clark · Sherman Minton

Case opinions
- Majority: Reed, joined by Vinson, Jackson, Burton, Clark, Minton
- Concurrence: Jackson
- Dissent: Black, joined by Douglas
- Dissent: Frankfurter, joined by Douglas, in part

Laws applied
- U.S. Const. art. I, §8, clause 1; U.S. Const. amend. X; Revenue Act of 1951
- Overruled by
- Marchetti v. United States, 390 U.S. 39 (1968)

United States v. Kahriger, 345 U.S. 22 (1953), was a United States Supreme Court ruling that held certain provisions of the Revenue Act of 1951 were constitutional, in particular sections related to an occupational tax on persons involved in gambling.

The Supreme Court ruled that the Congressional purpose of penalizing intrastate gambling under the guise of imposing a tax did not violate the Constitution by infringing the police power reserved to the states. The Court stated: "Unless there are [penalty] provisions extraneous to any tax need, courts are without authority to limit the exercise of the taxing power."

The Supreme Court also ruled that the 1951 Revenue Act did not violate the Fifth Amendment privilege against self-incrimination. However, this holding was later overruled by the Court in Marchetti v. United States.
