= United States Court of Private Land Claims =

Court created to resolve land claims in the western U.S. (1891–1904)

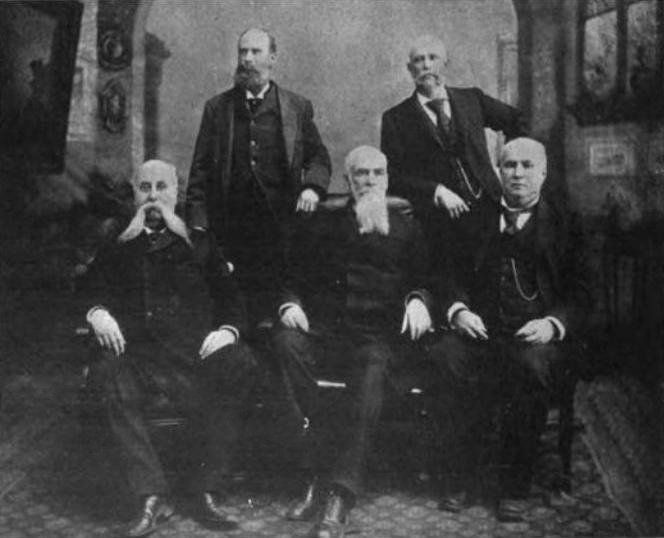
Justices for the United States Court of Private Land Claims (1891–1904). Pictured (L-R): Thomas C. Fuller, Wilbur F. Stone, Chief Justice Joseph R. Reed, Henry C. Sluss, and William W. Murray

The United States Court of Private Land Claims (1891–1904) was an ad-hoc court created to decide land claims guaranteed by the Treaty of Guadalupe Hidalgo, in the territories of New Mexico, Arizona, and Utah, and in the states of Nevada, Colorado, and Wyoming.

== Origins ==
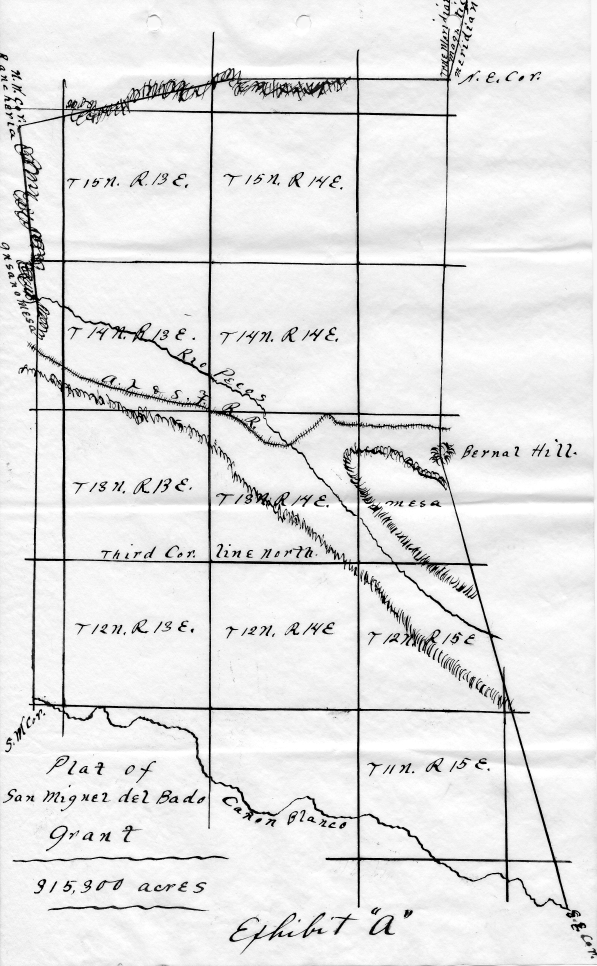
Map of the San Miguel del Bado Grant in central New Mexico, from the United States Court of Private Land Claims, Julian Sandoval Case 25 (1894–1902).

During Spanish (1598–1821) and Mexican (1821–1846) rule over what was to become the U.S. Southwest, the governments made land grants to various individuals and communities. Under the Treaty of Guadalupe Hidalgo (1848), which ended the Mexican–American War, the United States obtained these territories, and in Article VIII guaranteed the rights of Mexican and former Mexican citizens to their property. However, the U.S. Senate in ratifying the treaty eliminated Article 10, which stated that the U.S. government would honor and guarantee all land grants awarded in lands ceded to the United States to citizens of Spain and Mexico by those respective governments. Thus land grants were subject to being proved.

In 1851, Congress passed the first legislation implementing the property protection provisions of the Treaty of Guadalupe Hidalgo, however it addressed only the Spanish and Mexican grants in California. Congress focused on California's land grants first because California was already a populous state, and it wanted to encourage further settlement of the public domain land there.

In 1854, the U.S. Congress established the office of the Surveyor General of New Mexico to ascertain "the origin, nature, character, and extent to all claims to lands under the laws, usages, and customs of Spain and Mexico." At first the Congress tried to deal with each land grant by special bill and the House had a Committee on Private Land Claims, seats on which were sought after as a way of dispensing patronage. By 1880 the corruption inherent in determining these claims by politics rather than on a legal basis forced an end to this practice. For ten years no claims could be proved as against the United States.

In 1889, Mexican farmers organized as Las Gorras Blancas to resist land theft. They cut fences of squatters, burned barns, and destroyed railroads. Up to 1500 farmers participated and had much wider sympathy among the Mexican Land Grant communities.

In 1891, 42 years after the Treaty of Guadalupe-Hidalgo, the U.S. Congress created the Court of Private Land Claims consisting of five justices appointed for a term to expire on December 31, 1895. The court itself was to exist only during this period, although its existence and the terms of the justices were from time to time extended until June 30, 1904. This court was given jurisdiction over claims to land in the territories of New Mexico, Arizona, and Utah, and in the states of Nevada, Colorado, and Wyoming, which had not been previously proved and affirmed by the United States. Many of these Spanish or Mexican land grants were based upon incomplete documentation, in part because those governments did not issue deeds to the grantees, and records were kept variously at the territorial, state, vice-royal or imperial level.

== Work of the Court ==
Soon after the judges and United States attorney for the court, Matt G. Reynolds, were appointed in May 1891, they met in Denver to organize the court. Cases concerning land grants in Colorado were held in Denver. New Mexico cases were adjudicated in the federal courthouse in Santa Fe. Arizona cases were heard in Tucson and Phoenix.

The court heard 301 cases involving over thirty-six million acres (150,000 km^{2}) of land. Only eighty-seven land grants were confirmed, for a total of three million acres (12,000 km^{2}), or less than 10%. Many confirmed grants were reduced in size from that claimed. For example, the Cañon de Chama Grant was reduced from 200,000 to 1,500 acres (809.4 to 6.1 km^{2}). The land of the grants that were rejected, either directly by the court or on appeal through the U. S. Supreme Court, reverted to the public domain of the United States.

Among the many problems facing the court were the old Spanish system of metes and bounds. Century or two old landmarks were hard to find. The length of a vara (Spanish yard) might vary depending on the date of the grant. A grant might be to the faldas (Spanish skirt) of the mountains, which could be anywhere from the edge of the foothills to timberline.

== See also ==
- Public Land Commission
- Ranchos of California
