= List of boundary cases of the United States Supreme Court =

Article Three, Section Two, Clause One of the Constitution of the United States gives the Supreme Court of the United States original jurisdiction over matters including "controversies between two or more States". Historically, this jurisdiction has most often been called upon to settle boundary disputes, in which the states cannot agree on the correct location of the state line between them. While most of these cases are original jurisdiction, a handful have also been decided on appeal from decisions of lower courts, usually arising from disputes between private parties.

== Cases ==
=== Handly's Lessee v. Anthony (1820); Indiana and Kentucky ===
Infobox for the case

Handly's Lessee v. Anthony
- Supreme Court of the United States

Decided March 14, 1820
- Full case name: Handly's Lessee v. Anthony
- Citations: 18 U.S. 374 (more) 5 Wheat. 374; 5 L. Ed. 113; 1820 U.S. LEXIS 262

Case history
- Prior: On appeal from the Circuit Court of the United States for the District of Kentucky

Holding
- Where a river is said to be the boundary between two states, the boundary properly extended to the low water mark of the opposite shore and no higher; plaintiff's motion of ejectment based on title granted by the state of Kentucky was denied.

Court membership
- Chief Justice John Marshall Associate Justices Bushrod Washington · William Johnson; H. Brockholst Livingston · Thomas Todd; Gabriel Duvall · Joseph Story

Case opinion
- Majority: Marshall

Handly's Lessee v. Anthony, 18 U.S. (5 Wheat.) 374 (1820), was a ruling by the Supreme Court which held that the proper boundary between the states of Indiana and Kentucky was the low-water mark on the western and northwestern bank of the Ohio River. Motion by the plaintiff, Handly's lessee, to eject inhabitants of a peninsula in the Ohio River (which was at times temporarily cut off from Indiana by high water) was denied.

=== Poole v. Fleeger (1837); Kentucky and Tennessee ===
Infobox for the case

Poole v. Fleeger
- Supreme Court of the United States

Decided February 11, 1837
- Full case name: Burgess Poole and Others, Plaintiffs in Error v. The Lessee of John Fleeger and Others
- Citations: 36 U.S. 185 (more) 11 Pet. 185; 9 L. Ed. 680; 1837 U.S. LEXIS 174

Holding
- Plaintiffs are granted title to land in Kentucky improperly conveyed by Tennessee prior to the Compact of 1820 establishing the two states' mutual border.

Court membership
- Chief Justice Roger B. Taney Associate Justices Joseph Story · Smith Thompson; John McLean · Henry Baldwin; James M. Wayne · Philip P. Barbour

Case opinion
- Majority: Story, joined by unanimous

Poole v. Fleeger, 36 U.S. (11 Pet.) 185 (1837), was a 7-to-0 ruling by the Supreme Court which held that the states of Kentucky and Tennessee had properly entered into an agreement establishing a mutual border between the two states. The plaintiffs in the case were granted title to property improperly conveyed by the state of Tennessee north of this border. In the ruling, the Supreme Court asserted the fundamental right of states and nations to establish their borders regardless of private contract, and made a fundamental statement about the rights of parties to object to a trial court ruling under the rules of civil procedure.

=== Rhode Island v. Massachusetts (1838) ===
Infobox for the case

Rhode Island v. Massachusetts
- Supreme Court of the United States

Decided February 21, 1838
- Full case name: The State of Rhode Island and Providence Plantations, Complainants v. The Commonwealth of Massachusetts, Defendant
- Citations: 37 U.S. 657 (more) 12 Pet. 657; 9 L. Ed. 1233; 1838 U.S. LEXIS 372

Holding
- Supreme Court has original jurisdiction over a suit by one state against another over their shared border

Court membership
- Chief Justice Roger B. Taney Associate Justices Joseph Story · Smith Thompson; John McLean · Henry Baldwin; James M. Wayne · Philip P. Barbour; John Catron · John McKinley

Case opinions
- Majority: Baldwin, joined by Thompson, McLean, Wayne, Catron, McKinley
- Concurrence: Barbour
- Dissent: Taney
- Story took no part in the consideration or decision of the case.

Rhode Island v. Massachusetts, 37 U.S. (12 Pet.) 657 (1838), was a Supreme Court case in which the Court asserted its original jurisdiction over a suit in equity by one state against another over their shared border. The case involved a boundary dispute between Massachusetts and Rhode Island dating back to colonial times. Daniel Webster was involved in the case representing Massachusetts.

=== Missouri v. Iowa (1849) ===
Infobox for the case

Missouri v. Iowa
- Supreme Court of the United States

Decided February 13, 1849
- Full case name: State of Missouri v. State of Iowa
- Citations: 48 U.S. 660 (more) 7 How. 660; 12 L. Ed. 861

Holding
- The true northern boundary of Missouri and southern boundary of Iowa exists along the line laid by Colonel John C. Sullivan in 1816 pursuant to the Osage Treaty of 1815.

Court membership
- Chief Justice Roger B. Taney Associate Justices John McLean · James M. Wayne; John Catron · John McKinley; Peter V. Daniel · Samuel Nelson; Levi Woodbury · Robert C. Grier

Case opinion
- Majority: Catron, joined by Taney, McLean, Wayne, McKinley, Daniel, Nelson, Woodbury, Grier

Missouri v. Iowa, 48 U.S. (7 How.) 660 (1849), is a 9-to-0 ruling which held that the Sullivan Line of 1816 was the accepted boundary between the states of Iowa and Missouri. The ruling resolved a long-standing border dispute between the two states, which had nearly erupted in military clashes during the so-called "Honey War" of 1839.

=== Florida v. Georgia (1855) ===
Infobox for the case

Florida v. Georgia
- Supreme Court of the United States

Argued January 8–9, 1855 Decided March 6, 1855
- Full case name: The State of Florida, Complainant v. The State of Georgia
- Citations: 58 U.S. 478 (more) 17 How. 478; 15 L. Ed. 181; 1854 U.S. LEXIS 538

Holding
- The boundary between the State of Florida and the State of Georgia runs along "McNeil's line" according to the survey conducted on behalf of the U.S. government.

Court membership
- Chief Justice Roger B. Taney Associate Justices John McLean · James M. Wayne; John Catron · Peter V. Daniel; Samuel Nelson · Robert C. Grier; Benjamin R. Curtis · John A. Campbell

Case opinions
- Majority: Taney, joined by Wayne, Catron, Nelson, Grier
- Dissent: Curtis, joined by McLean
- Dissent: Campbell, joined by Daniel

Laws applied
- 28 U.S.C. § 1251; Art. I, Art, X U.S. Constitution

Florida v. Georgia, 58 U.S. (17 How.) 478 (1855), addressed a boundary dispute was between Florida and Georgia. Florida claimed that the state line was a straight line (called McNeil's line, for the man who surveyed it for the U.S. government in 1825) from the confluence of Georgia's Chattahoochee and Flint rivers (forming the Apalachicola River, at a point now under Lake Seminole), then very slightly south of due east to the source of the St. Mary's River, which was the point specified in Pinckney's Treaty in 1795. That eastern point of the straight line was near Ellicott mound, which was erected in 1799 at "about 30° 34' N." Georgia claimed that the headwaters of the St. Mary's River were at the source of the southern branch, some 30 miles or nearly 50 kilometers south, at Lake Spalding or Lake Randolph. If upheld, Georgia would have obtained additional territory estimated at 800 to 2,355 square miles. The position of the U.S. commissioners was that the actual source of the St. Mary's was two miles north of the Ellicott mound.

The court ruled in favor of Florida, setting the state boundary line along "McNeil's line." This outcome was followed in 1859 by the surveying of the Orr and Whitner line. On April 9, 1872, Congress approved the Orr and Whitner Line as part of the border between Georgia and Florida.

=== Alabama v. Georgia (1860) ===
Infobox for the case

Alabama v. Georgia
- Supreme Court of the United States

Decided May 1, 1860
- Full case name: State of Alabama v. State of Georgia
- Citations: 64 U.S. 505 (more) 23 How. 505; 16 L. Ed. 556

Holding
- The true border between the states of Alabama and Georgia is the average water mark on the western bank of the Chattahoochee River

Court membership
- Chief Justice Roger B. Taney Associate Justices John McLean · James M. Wayne; John Catron · Peter V. Daniel; Samuel Nelson · Robert C. Grier; John A. Campbell · Nathan Clifford

Case opinion
- Majority: Wayne, joined by unanimous court

Alabama v. Georgia, 64 U.S. (23 How.) 505 (1860), unanimously held that the true border between the states of Alabama and Georgia was the average water mark on the western bank of the Chattahoochee River. In coming to its conclusion, the Court defined what constituted the bed and bank of a river. The case has had international repercussions as well. The Supreme Court's definition was adopted by courts in the United Kingdom in the case Hindson v. Ashby (1896) 65 LJ Ch. 515, 2 Ch. 27.

In the Compact of 1802, Georgia ceded western lands beyond the Chattahoochee River to the United States. The Compact specified that Georgia's western boundary would be:

West of a line beginning on the western bank of the Chattahoochee River where the same crosses the boundary between the United States and Spain, running up the said river and along the western bank thereof.

Alabama came into a dispute with Georgia over the specific meaning of the Compact of 1802, arguing that the high water mark of the Chattahoochee River sometimes marched as much as a half-mile inland to the west. Georgia claimed that the Compact of 1802 did not cover the northernmost part of the border (assertedly obtained directly from the state of South Carolina in 1787 without first transferring title to the United States). The court noted the mutual nature of the Compact of 1802, and pointed out that Georgia admitted in the agreement that its western boundary extended north to the border with the state of Tennessee. This, then, made any argument over the South Carolina cession of 1787 moot. However, the court found that "The contract of cession must be interpreted by the words of it, according to their received meaning and use in the language in which it is written, as that can be collected from judicial opinions concerning the rights of private persons upon rivers, and the writings of publicists in reference to the settlement of controversies between nations and States as to their ownership and jurisdiction on the soil of rivers within their banks and beds." Citing scholarly sources from Europe, American case law (such as Handly's Lessee v. Anthony, 18 U. S. 374 (1820)), and other cessions between states and the United States, the court concluded that the Compact of 1802 did not mean either low-water mark claimed by Alabama, or the high-water mark, as claimed by Georgia. Rather, the Compact of 1802 specified the western bank, and the bank was different from the high-water mark, concluding that only the average water level defined the bank, and that the boundary of Georgia should be so marked. The Court also reaffirmed that the Compact of 1802 gave both states free navigation of the river.

=== Virginia v. West Virginia (1871) ===
Infobox for the case

Virginia v. West Virginia
- Supreme Court of the United States

Decided March 6, 1871
- Full case name: State of Virginia v. State of West Virginia
- Citations: 78 U.S. 39 (more) 11 Wall. 39; 20 L. Ed. 67

Holding
- Where a governor has discretion in the conduct of the election, the legislature is bound by his action and cannot undo the results based on fraud.

Court membership
- Chief Justice Salmon P. Chase Associate Justices Samuel Nelson · Nathan Clifford; Noah H. Swayne · Samuel F. Miller; David Davis · Stephen J. Field; William Strong · Joseph P. Bradley

Case opinions
- Majority: Miller, joined by Chase, Nelson, Swayne, Strong, Bradley
- Dissent: Davis, joined by Clifford, Field

Virginia v. West Virginia, 78 U.S. (11 Wall.) 39 (1871), was a 6-3 ruling by the Supreme Court that held that if a governor has discretion in the conduct of the election, the legislature is bound by his action and cannot undo the results based on fraud. The Court implicitly affirmed that the breakaway Virginia counties had received the necessary consent of both the Commonwealth of Virginia and the United States Congress to become a separate U.S. state. The Court also explicitly held that Berkeley County and Jefferson County were part of the new State of West Virginia.

=== Virginia v. Tennessee (1893) ===
Infobox for the case

Virginia v. Tennessee
- Supreme Court of the United States

Argued March 8–9, 1893 Decided April 3, 1893
- Full case name: Commonwealth of Virginia v. State of Tennessee
- Citations: 148 U.S. 503 (more) 13 S. Ct. 728; 37 L. Ed. 537; 1893 U.S. LEXIS 2248

Holding
- The border as set forth in the survey of 1803 is the border between the two states.

Court membership
- Chief Justice Melville Fuller Associate Justices Stephen J. Field · John M. Harlan; Horace Gray · Samuel Blatchford; David J. Brewer · Henry B. Brown; George Shiras Jr. · Howell E. Jackson

Case opinion
- Majority: Field, joined by unanimous

Laws applied
- U.S. Const. Art. I, § 10, cl. 3

Virginia v. Tennessee, 148 U.S. 503 (1893), was a suit brought before the Supreme Court that sought to settle two questions:

- What is the correct boundary between the two states and, if the boundary was inaccurately set, can the state ask the court to change it?
- Does an agreement setting the boundary between two states require approval of Congress under the Compact Clause of the United States Constitution?

=== Maryland v. West Virginia (1910) ===
Infobox for the case

Maryland v. West Virginia
- Supreme Court of the United States

Argued November 2–4, 1909 Decided February 21, 1910
- Full case name: State of Maryland v. State of West Virginia
- Citations: 217 U.S. 1 (more) 30 S. Ct. 268; 54 L. Ed. 645; 1910 U.S. LEXIS 1942

Case history
- Subsequent: Maryland v. West Virginia, 225 U.S. 1 (1912)

Holding
- West Virginia's border extends to the low-water mark on the south bank of the Potomac River; Boundary disputes should be adjusted according to prescription and equity to least disturb private rights and titles

Court membership
- Chief Justice Melville Fuller Associate Justices John M. Harlan · David J. Brewer; Edward D. White · Joseph McKenna; Oliver W. Holmes Jr. · William R. Day; William H. Moody · Horace H. Lurton

Case opinion
- Majority: Day, joined by unanimous

Maryland v. West Virginia, 217 U.S. 1 (1910), held in a 9-to-0 ruling that the boundary between the American states of Maryland and West Virginia is the south bank of the North Branch Potomac River. The decision also affirmed criteria for adjudicating boundary disputes between states, which said that decisions should be based on the specific facts of the case, applying the principles of law and equity in such a way that least disturbs private rights and title to land.

=== New Mexico v. Texas (1927) ===
Infobox for the case

State of New Mexico v. State of Texas
- Supreme Court of the United States

Argued January 4–5, 1927 Decided December 5, 1927
- Full case name: State of New Mexico v. State of Texas
- Citations: 275 U.S. 279 (more) 48 S. Ct. 126; 72 L. Ed. 280; 1927 U.S. LEXIS 280

Case history
- Prior: Original Jurisdiction
- Subsequent: Modified on denial of rehearing, April 9, 1928

Holding
- The boundary line between New Mexico and Texas is the middle of the channel of the Rio Grande as it was located in 1850.

Court membership
- Chief Justice William H. Taft Associate Justices Oliver W. Holmes Jr. · Willis Van Devanter; James C. McReynolds · Louis Brandeis; George Sutherland · Pierce Butler; Edward T. Sanford · Harlan F. Stone

Case opinion
- Majority: Sanford, joined by unanimous

New Mexico v. Texas, 275 U.S. 279 (1927), was a Supreme Court case that determined the boundary between Texas and New Mexico in the vicinity of El Paso, Texas.

This suit was initially brought by the State of New Mexico against the State of Texas in 1913 to settle a controversy concerning the location of their common boundary in the valley of the Rio Grande about 15 miles (24 km) from the parallel of 32 degrees north latitude to the parallel of 31 degrees 47 minutes on the international boundary between the United States and Mexico. Each State asserted that the true boundary line is the middle of the channel of the Rio Grande in 1850. Neither alleged that there had been any change in this line by accretions, and the only issue was as to the true location of the channel in that year. New Mexico believed it was closer to the then-present course of the river. Texas had been issuing deeds for the area known as the Country Club Area, as this was the land in dispute, the case became known by the moniker the Country Club Dispute.

A special master appointed by the Supreme Court in 1924 made extensive findings, concluding "that the allegations in New Mexico's bill as to the location and course of the Rio Grande 'as it existed in the year 1850' were not sustained, and that the river did not then flow on the eastern side of the valley as claimed by New Mexico; that its location and course in 1850 was, in general, as alleged in the cross- bill of Texas." The unanimous Supreme Court then held that "the testimony of ancient witnesses called by New Mexico as to their recollection of the old river, is far from satisfactory, and does not, in view of the other evidence, sustain the burden resting on New Mexico".

=== Vermont v. New Hampshire (1933) ===
Infobox for the case

Vermont v. New Hampshire
- Supreme Court of the United States

Argued April 20–21, 1933 Decided May 29, 1933
- Full case name: The State of Vermont v. The State of New Hampshire
- Citations: 289 U.S. 593 (more) 53 S. Ct. 708; 77 L. Ed. 1392

Case history
- Prior: Hearing upon exceptions to report of the Special Master

Holding
- The boundary between Vermont and New Hampshire is neither the thread of the channel of the Connecticut River nor the top of the west bank of the river, but rather the west bank of the river at the mean low-water mark.

Court membership
- Chief Justice Charles E. Hughes Associate Justices Willis Van Devanter · James C. McReynolds; Louis Brandeis · George Sutherland; Pierce Butler · Harlan F. Stone; Owen Roberts · Benjamin N. Cardozo

Case opinion
- Majority: Stone, joined by Van Devanter, McReynolds, Brandeis, Sutherland, Butler, Roberts, Cardozo
- Hughes took no part in the consideration or decision of the case.

Vermont v. New Hampshire, 289 U.S. 593 (1933), was a Supreme Court case holding that the boundary between Vermont and New Hampshire is neither the thread of the channel of the Connecticut River nor the top of the west bank of the river, but rather the west bank of the river at the mean low-water mark.

=== Wisconsin v. Michigan (1935, 1936) ===
Infobox for the case

List of boundary cases of the United States Supreme Court
- Supreme Court of the United States

Argued March 2, 1936 Decided March 16, 1936
- Full case name: The State of Wisconsin v. The State of Michigan
- Citations: 297 U.S. 547 (more) 56 S. Ct. 584; 80 L. Ed. 856

Case history
- Prior: 295 U.S. 455 (1935).

Holding
- The boundary between Michigan and Wisconsin is amended as stated

Court membership
- Chief Justice Charles E. Hughes Associate Justices Willis Van Devanter · James C. McReynolds; Louis Brandeis · George Sutherland; Pierce Butler · Harlan F. Stone; Owen Roberts · Benjamin N. Cardozo

Case opinion
- Majority: Unanimous

Wisconsin v. Michigan, 295 U.S. 455 (1935) and Wisconsin v. Michigan, 297 U.S. 547 (1936), settled a territorial dispute between Wisconsin and Michigan.

The 1836 boundary description between Wisconsin and Michigan described the line through northwest Lake Michigan as "the most usual ship channel". This description needed clarification as two routes were in use into Green Bay. Multiple islands lay in between and all were claimed as part of both Door County, Wisconsin, and Delta County, Michigan. A similar case, Michigan v. Wisconsin 270 U.S. 295 (1926), had previously been brought to the Supreme Court but was dismissed. In 1936, the Supreme Court decision chose the ship channel through the Rock Island Passage as the more common, so Wisconsin retained the intervening water area with its islands: Plum, Detroit, Washington, Hog, and Rock.

=== Arkansas v. Tennessee (1970) ===
Infobox for the case

Arkansas v. Tennessee
- Supreme Court of the United States

Argued January 19, 1970 Decided February 25, 1970
- Full case name: Arkansas v. Tennessee
- Citations: 397 U.S. 88 (more) 90 S. Ct. 784; 25 L. Ed. 2d 73

Case history
- Prior: Special master appointed, Arkansas v. Tennessee, 389 U.S. 1026 (1968).

Court membership
- Chief Justice Warren E. Burger Associate Justices Hugo Black · William O. Douglas; John M. Harlan II · William J. Brennan Jr. Potter Stewart · Byron White; Thurgood Marshall

Arkansas v. Tennessee, 397 U.S. 88 (1970), determined a boundary line between the states of Arkansas and Tennessee.

On January 15, 1968, the court appointed Gunnar Nordbye, a Senior United States Judge of the District of Minnesota, as Special Master to determine the state line in the disputed area. Nordbye conducted an evidentiary hearing and viewed the area. He then filed his report with the Supreme Court recommending that all of the disputed area be declared part of the State of Tennessee. The parties had agreed that the state line was the thalweg, or steamboat channel, of the Mississippi River as it flows west and southward between the states. Nordbye heard evidence and was presented exhibits and maps which showed that the migration of the Mississippi River northward and west continued until about 1912. At that time, an avulsion occurred leaving Tennessee lands on the west or Arkansas side of the new or avulsive river channel. Nordbye found that, thereafter, because of the avulsion, the water in the thalweg became stagnant, and erosion and accretion no longer occurred. At this time, the boundary between Arkansas and Tennessee became fixed in the middle of the old abandoned channel. The Supreme Court affirmed this finding, quoting from its opinion in an earlier dispute between the same states where it had held:

It is settled beyond the possibility of dispute that, where running streams are the boundaries between States, the same rule applies as between private proprietors, namely, that, when the bed and channel are changed by the natural and gradual processes known as erosion and accretion, the boundary follows the varying course of the stream; while, if the stream from any cause, natural or artificial, suddenly leaves its old bed and forms a new one, by the process known as an avulsion, the resulting change of channel works no change of boundary, which remains in the middle of the old channel, although no water may be flowing in it, and irrespective of subsequent changes in the new channel.

Nordbye was then further authorized to engage surveyors to determine the exact line of the boundary, with the states to split the cost. A decree establishing the surveyed boundary line was entered on June 23, 1970.

=== Illinois v. Missouri (1970) ===
Infobox for the case

Illinois v. Missouri
- Supreme Court of the United States
- Full case name: Illinois v. Missouri
- Citations: 399 U.S. 146 (more)

Case history
- Prior: Special master appointed

Illinois v. Missouri, 399 U.S. 146 (1970), was a per curiam decision determining a boundary line between the states of Illinois and Missouri. The case specifically assigned ownership of several islands in the Mississippi River. The court referred the case to a special master who filed a report, which was adopted by the court, decreeing that:

(1) The boundary line between the States of Illinois and Missouri for the geographical area involved in this action is hereby determined and decreed to consist of the following legal description: ...

the body of land given identification in the evidence as "Kaskaskia Island" is hereby confirmed as against Missouri and decreed to exist in Illinois.

the body of land given identification in the evidence as "Beaver Island" is hereby confirmed as against Missouri and decreed to exist in Illinois.

right claimed by Missouri to each of the two bodies of land given identification severally in the evidence as "Cottonwoods" and "Roth Island" is hereby sustained as against Illinois and decreed to exist in Missouri.

=== New Hampshire v. Maine (1977) ===
Infobox for the case

New Hampshire v. Maine
- Supreme Court of the United States

Original jurisdiction Argued April 19, 1977 Decided June 14, 1977
- Full case name: New Hampshire v. Maine
- Citations: 426 U.S. 363 (more) 96 S. Ct. 2113; 48 L. Ed. 2d 701; 1976 U.S. LEXIS 60

Outcome
- Consent decree stipulated between parties and agreed to by parties is permissible under Vermont v. New York, 417 U.S. 270 (1974). States are not adjusting the boundary between them, which was fixed by the 1740 decree; the consent decree simply locates precisely the already existing boundary, and neither State is enhancing its power and threatening supremacy of the Federal Government.

Court membership
- Chief Justice Warren E. Burger Associate Justices William J. Brennan Jr. · Potter Stewart; Byron White · Thurgood Marshall; Harry Blackmun · Lewis F. Powell Jr. William Rehnquist · John P. Stevens

Case opinions
- Majority: Brennan, joined by Burger, Stewart, Marshall, Powell, Rehnquist
- Dissent: White, joined by Blackmun, Stevens

New Hampshire v. Maine, 426 U.S. 363 (1977), held that the boundary between the states of New Hampshire and Maine was fixed by the 1740 decree of King George II of Great Britain. Both sides entered into a consent decree which was accepted by the special master appointed by the Court.

=== Kentucky v. Indiana (1985) ===
Kentucky v. Indiana, 474 U.S. 1 (1985), settled a dispute over the boundary line between Kentucky and Indiana based on the low-water mark of Ohio River.

=== Georgia v. South Carolina (1990) ===
Infobox for the case

Georgia v. South Carolina
- Supreme Court of the United States

Argued January 8, 1990 Decided June 25, 1990
- Full case name: Georgia v. South Carolina
- Citations: 497 U.S. 376 (more) 42 S. Ct. 597; 66 L. Ed. 1069

Court membership
- Chief Justice William Rehnquist Associate Justices William J. Brennan Jr. · Byron White; Thurgood Marshall · Harry Blackmun; John P. Stevens · Sandra Day O'Connor; Antonin Scalia · Anthony Kennedy

Case opinions
- Plurality: Blackmun, joined by O'Connor, Brennan
- Dissent: Stevens, joined by Scalia
- Dissent: White, joined by Marshall
- Dissent: Scalia, joined by Kennedy
- Dissent: Kennedy, joined by Rehnquist

Laws applied
- Treaty of Beaufort

Georgia v. South Carolina, 497 U.S. 376 (1990), is one of a long series of cases determining the borders of the state of Georgia. In this case, the court decided the exact border within the Savannah River and whether islands should be a part of Georgia or South Carolina. It also decided the seaward border.

=== Mississippi v. Louisiana (1992) ===
Infobox for the case

Mississippi v. Louisiana
- Supreme Court of the United States
- Full case name: Mississippi v. Louisiana
- Citations: 506 U.S. 73 (more)

Case history
- Prior: Special master appointed

Mississippi v. Louisiana, 506 U.S. 73 (1992), arose as a private dispute in the United States District Court for the Southern District of Mississippi, regarding title to land along the west bank of the Mississippi River near Lake Providence, Louisiana. The state of Louisiana intervened, filing a third-party complaint against Mississippi to determine the boundary between the states in the vicinity of the disputed land, which the district court resolved in favor of the private party from Mississippi. The United States Court of Appeals for the Eleventh Circuit reversed, finding the land to be in Louisiana. On appeal, the Supreme Court held that that under 28 U.S.C. § 1251(a), granting it original and exclusive jurisdiction of all controversies between two states, deprived the district court of jurisdiction over Louisiana's third-party complaint against Mississippi altogether. Since neither the district court nor the court of appeals had jurisdiction to consider the matter, the Supreme Court remanded the matter to the district court to determine the rights of the private parties, noting that the outcome could not effect the legal boundaries of the states themselves.

=== New Jersey v. New York (1998) ===
Infobox for the case

New Jersey v. New York
- Supreme Court of the United States

Argued January 12, 1998 Decided May 26, 1998
- Full case name: State of New Jersey v. State of New York
- Citations: 523 U.S. 767 (more) 118 S. Ct. 1726; 140 L. Ed. 2d 993; 1998 U.S. LEXIS 3405; 66 U.S.L.W. 4389; 98 Daily Journal DAR 5406; 1998 Colo. J. C.A.R. 2596; 11 Fla. L. Weekly Fed. S 563

Holding
- New Jersey has sovereign authority over the filled land added to the original Island. New Jersey's exception to that portion of the Special Master's report concerning the Court's authority to adjust the original boundary line between the two States is sustained. The other exceptions of New Jersey and New York are overruled.

Court membership
- Chief Justice William Rehnquist Associate Justices John P. Stevens · Sandra Day O'Connor; Antonin Scalia · Anthony Kennedy; David Souter · Clarence Thomas; Ruth Bader Ginsburg · Stephen Breyer

Case opinions
- Majority: Souter, joined by Rehnquist, O'Connor, Kennedy, Ginsburg, Breyer
- Concurrence: Breyer, joined by Ginsburg
- Dissent: Stevens
- Dissent: Scalia, joined by Thomas

Laws applied
- 1834 Compact between New York and New Jersey

New Jersey v. New York, 523 U.S. 767 (1998), was a Supreme Court case that determined that roughly 83% of Ellis Island was part of New Jersey, rather than New York State.

Because the New Jersey original 1664 land grant was unclear, the states of New Jersey and New York disputed ownership and jurisdiction over the Hudson River and its islands. The two states entered into a compact ratified by Congress in 1834, which set a boundary line to be the middle of the Hudson River, but giving all islands in the river (including Ellis Island) to New York. From 1890 to 1934, the federal government expanded Ellis Island through land reclamation to accommodate its immigration station. Starting in the 1980s, New Jersey contended that the new portions of the Ellis Island were part of New Jersey. New Jersey filed suit in 1997.

In a 6–3 decision, the Supreme Court ruled that because the 1834 compact gave New Jersey jurisdiction over submerged land around Ellis Island, the new land was in New Jersey, not New York. The ruling changed little in practice, because Ellis Island is federal land. The ruling changed allocation of sales tax revenue, and future development plans for the island.

== See also ==
- Border disputes between New York and Connecticut
