= New Hampshire v. Maine =

- Supreme Court of the United States

Original jurisdiction Argued April 19, 1977 Decided June 14, 1977
- Full case name: New Hampshire v. Maine
- Citations: 426 U.S. 363 (more) 96 S. Ct. 2113; 48 L. Ed. 2d 701; 1976 U.S. LEXIS 60

Outcome
- Consent decree stipulated between parties and agreed to by parties is permissible under Vermont v. New York, 417 U.S. 270 (1974). States are not adjusting the boundary between them, which was fixed by the 1740 decree; the consent decree simply locates precisely the already existing boundary, and neither State is enhancing its power and threatening supremacy of the Federal Government.

Court membership
- Chief Justice Warren E. Burger Associate Justices William J. Brennan Jr. · Potter Stewart; Byron White · Thurgood Marshall; Harry Blackmun · Lewis F. Powell Jr. William Rehnquist · John P. Stevens

Case opinions
- Majority: Brennan, joined by Burger, Stewart, Marshall, Powell, Rehnquist
- Dissent: White, joined by Blackmun, Stevens

New Hampshire v. Maine, 426 U.S. 363 (1977), was an original jurisdiction case in which the U.S. Supreme Court held that the boundary between the states of New Hampshire and Maine was fixed by the 1740 decree of King George II of Great Britain.

This boundary dispute involved locating the lateral marine boundary separating the States between the mouth of Portsmouth Harbor and the entrance to Gosport Harbor in the Isles of Shoals. Both sides entered into a consent decree which was accepted by the special master appointed by the Court.

== See also ==
- Florida v. Georgia (1855)
- Piscataqua River border dispute, New Hampshire v. Maine, No. 130 Original, 532 U.S. 742 (2001)
- New Mexico v. Texas
