= List of United States Supreme Court cases, volume 37 =

Supreme Court of the United States
- Interactive map of Supreme Court of the United States
- 38°53′26″N 77°00′16″W
- Established: March 4, 1789; 237 years ago
- Location: Washington, D.C.
- Coordinates: 38°53′26″N 77°00′16″W
- Composition method: Presidential nomination with Senate confirmation
- Authorised by: Constitution of the United States, Art. III, § 1
- Judge term length: life tenure, subject to impeachment and removal
- Number of positions: 9 (by statute)
- Website: supremecourt.gov

This is a list of cases reported in volume 37 (12 Pet.) of United States Reports, decided by the Supreme Court of the United States in 1838.

== Nominative reports ==
In 1874, the U.S. government created the United States Reports, and retroactively numbered older privately-published case reports as part of the new series. As a result, cases appearing in volumes 1–90 of U.S. Reports have dual citation forms; one for the volume number of U.S. Reports, and one for the volume number of the reports named for the relevant reporter of decisions (these are called "nominative reports").

=== Richard Peters, Jr. ===
Starting with the 26th volume of U.S. Reports, the Reporter of Decisions of the Supreme Court of the United States was Richard Peters, Jr. Peters was Reporter of Decisions from 1828 to 1843, covering volumes 26 through 41 of United States Reports which correspond to volumes 1 through 16 of his Peters's Reports. As such, the dual form of citation to, for example, United States v. Coombs is 37 U.S. (12 Pet.) 72 (1838).

== Justices of the Supreme Court at the time of 37 U.S. (12 Pet.) ==
The Supreme Court is established by Article III, Section 1 of the Constitution of the United States, which says: "The judicial Power of the United States, shall be vested in one supreme Court . . .". The size of the Court is not specified; the Constitution leaves it to Congress to set the number of justices. Under the Judiciary Act of 1789 Congress originally fixed the number of justices at six (one chief justice and five associate justices). Since 1789 Congress has varied the size of the Court from six to seven, nine, ten, and back to nine justices (always including one chief justice).

When the cases in 37 U.S. (12 Pet.) were decided, the Court for the first time comprised nine justices, its membership having been expanded under the Eighth and Ninth Circuits Act of 1837; they were:

Portrait	Justice	Office	Home State	Succeeded	Date confirmed by the Senate (Vote)	Tenure on Supreme Court
	Roger B. Taney	Chief Justice	Maryland	John Marshall	March 15, 1836 (29–15)	March 28, 1836 – October 12, 1864 (Died)
	Joseph Story	Associate Justice	Massachusetts	William Cushing	November 18, 1811 (Acclamation)	February 3, 1812 – September 10, 1845 (Died)
	Smith Thompson	Associate Justice	New York	Henry Brockholst Livingston	December 9, 1823 (Acclamation)	September 1, 1823 – December 18, 1843 (Died)
	John McLean	Associate Justice	Ohio	Robert Trimble	March 7, 1829 (Acclamation)	January 11, 1830 – April 4, 1861 (Died)
	Henry Baldwin	Associate Justice	Pennsylvania	Bushrod Washington	January 6, 1830 (41–2)	January 18, 1830 – April 21, 1844 (Died)
	James Moore Wayne	Associate Justice	Georgia	William Johnson	January 9, 1835 (Acclamation)	January 14, 1835 – July 5, 1867 (Died)
	Philip P. Barbour	Associate Justice	Virginia	Gabriel Duvall	March 15, 1836 (30–11)	May 12, 1836 – February 25, 1841 (Died)
	John Catron	Associate Justice	Tennessee	newly created seat	March 8, 1837 (28–15)	May 1, 1837 – May 30, 1865 (Died)
	John McKinley	Associate Justice	Alabama	newly created seat	September 25, 1837 (Acclamation)	January 9, 1838 – July 19, 1852 (Died)

== Notable Case in 37 U.S. (12 Pet.) ==
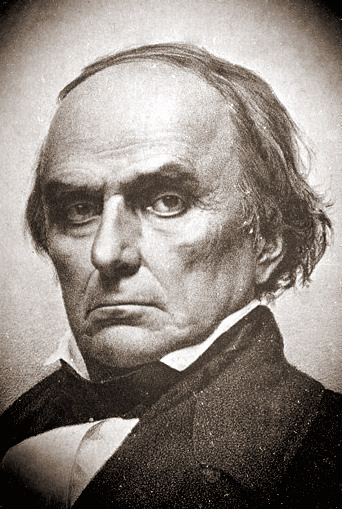
Daniel Webster

=== Rhode Island v. Massachusetts ===
In Rhode Island v. Massachusetts, 37 U.S. (12 Pet.) 755 (1838), the Supreme Court asserted its original jurisdiction in a case involving one state against another over their shared border. The case involved a boundary dispute between Massachusetts and Rhode Island dating back to colonial times. Daniel Webster was involved in the case, representing Massachusetts.

== Citation style ==
Under the Judiciary Act of 1789 the federal court structure at the time comprised District Courts, which had general trial jurisdiction; Circuit Courts, which had mixed trial and appellate (from the US District Courts) jurisdiction; and the United States Supreme Court, which had appellate jurisdiction over the federal District and Circuit courts—and for certain issues over state courts. The Supreme Court also had limited original jurisdiction (i.e., in which cases could be filed directly with the Supreme Court without first having been heard by a lower federal or state court). There were one or more federal District Courts and/or Circuit Courts in each state, territory, or other geographical region.

Bluebook citation style is used for case names, citations, and jurisdictions.

- "C.C.D." = United States Circuit Court for the District of . . .
  - e.g.,"C.C.D.N.J." = United States Circuit Court for the District of New Jersey
- "D." = United States District Court for the District of . . .
  - e.g.,"D. Mass." = United States District Court for the District of Massachusetts
- "E." = Eastern; "M." = Middle; "N." = Northern; "S." = Southern; "W." = Western
  - e.g.,"C.C.S.D.N.Y." = United States Circuit Court for the Southern District of New York
  - e.g.,"M.D. Ala." = United States District Court for the Middle District of Alabama
- "Ct. Cl." = United States Court of Claims
- The abbreviation of a state's name alone indicates the highest appellate court in that state's judiciary at the time.
  - e.g.,"Pa." = Supreme Court of Pennsylvania
  - e.g.,"Me." = Supreme Judicial Court of Maine

== List of cases in 37 U.S. (12 Pet.) ==
Case Name	Page and year	Opinion of the Court	Concurring opinion(s)	Dissenting opinion(s)	Lower court	Disposition of case
United States v. Laub	1 (1838)	Thompson	none	none	C.C.D.C.	affirmed
Swayze's Lessee v. Burke	11 (1838)	McLean	none	none	W.D. Pa.	reversed
Benton v. Woolsey	27 (1838)	Taney	none	none	N.D.N.Y.	affirmed
Second Bank of the United States v. Daniel	32 (1838)	Catron	none	none	C.C.D. Ky.	reversed
Bradstreet v. Thomas	59 (1838)	Taney	none	none	N.D.N.Y.	dismissal denied
M'Kinney v. Carroll	66 (1838)	McKinley	none	none	Ky.	dismissed
United States v. Coombs	72 (1838)	Story	none	none	C.C.S.D.N.Y.	certification
M'Niel v. Holbrook	84 (1838)	Taney	none	none	C.C.D. Ga.	affirmed
Town of Georgetown v. Alexandria Canal Company	91 (1838)	Barbour	none	none	C.C.D.C.	affirmed
West v. Brashear	101 (1838)	Taney	none	none	C.C.D. Ky.	dismissal denied
Beaston v. Farmers' Bank	102 (1838)	McKinley	none	Story	Md.	affirmed
Wilson's Heirs v. Life and Fire Insurance Company of New York	140 (1838)	Taney	none	none	E.D. La.	dismissed
Sarchet v. United States	143 (1838)	Taney	none	none	C.C.S.D.N.Y.	dismissed
Scott v. Lloyd	145 (1838)	McLean	none	none	C.C.D.C.	affirmed
Zacharie v. Franklin	151 (1838)	Barbour	none	none	E.D. La.	affirmed
Clarke v. Mathewson	164 (1838)	Story	none	none	C.C.D.R.I.	reversed
Clarke v. White	178 (1838)	Catron	none	none	C.C.D.C.	affirmed
Stelle v. Carroll	201 (1838)	Taney	none	none	C.C.D.C.	affirmed
Adams, Cunningham and Company v. Jones	207 (1838)	Story	none	none	C.C.D.W. Tenn.	certification
United States v. Mills' Heirs	215 (1838)	Wayne	none	none	Fla. Super. Ct.	reversed
Levy v. Arredondo	218 (1838)	per curiam	none	none	Ct. App. Terr. Fla.	reversed
Rogers v. Batchelor	221 (1838)	Story	none	none	D. Miss.	affirmed
Lyon v. Auchincloss and Company	234 (1838)	McLean	none	none	E.D. La.	affirmed
White v. Turk	238 (1838)	McKinley	none	none	C.C.D.E. Tenn.	dismissed
Jenkins v. Pye	241 (1838)	Thompson	Catron	none	C.C.D.C.	reversed
Galloway v. Finley	264 (1838)	Catron	none	none	C.C.W.D. Pa.	affirmed
Toland v. Sprague	300 (1838)	Barbour	Taney; Baldwin; Wayne	Taney; Baldwin; Wayne	C.C.E.D. Pa.	certification
Ex parte Story	339 (1838)	Taney	none	none	E.D. La.	mandamus denied
Hepburn v. Dubois	345 (1838)	Baldwin	none	none	W.D. Pa.	affirmed
Bradlie v. Maryland Insurance Company	378 (1838)	Story	none	none	C.C.D. Md.	affirmed
Strother v. Lucas	410 (1838)	Baldwin	Catron	none	D. Mo.	affirmed
Ex parte Poultney	472 (1838)	Taney	none	none	E.D. La.	show cause denied
United States v. Kingsley	476 (1838)	Wayne	none	none	Fla. Super. Ct.	reversed
Ex parte Sibbald	488 (1838)	Baldwin	none	none	Fla. Super. Ct.	decree granted
Reynolds v. Douglass	497 (1838)	McLean	none	none	D. Miss.	reversed
Choteau v. Marguerite	507 (1838)	per curiam	none	none	Mo.	dismissed
Garcia v. Lee	511 (1838)	Taney	none	none	E.D. La.	affirmed
Kendall v. United States ex rel. Stokes	524 (1838)	Thompson	none	Taney, Barbour	C.C.D.C.	affirmed
United States v. Delespine's Heirs	654 (1838)	Wayne	none	none	Fla. Super. Ct.	affirmed
Rhode Island v. Massachusetts	755 (1838)	Baldwin	Barbour	Taney	original	dismissal denied
Massachusetts v. Rhode Island	755 (1838)	Thompson	none	none	original	withdrawal of appearance

== See also ==
- Certificate of division
