= List of United States Supreme Court cases, volume 58 =

Supreme Court of the United States
- Interactive map of Supreme Court of the United States
- 38°53′26″N 77°00′16″W
- Established: March 4, 1789; 236 years ago
- Location: Washington, D.C.
- Coordinates: 38°53′26″N 77°00′16″W
- Composition method: Presidential nomination with Senate confirmation
- Authorised by: Constitution of the United States, Art. III, § 1
- Judge term length: life tenure, subject to impeachment and removal
- Number of positions: 9 (by statute)
- Website: supremecourt.gov

This is a list of cases reported in volume 58 (17 How.) of United States Reports, decided by the Supreme Court of the United States in 1854 and 1855.

== Nominative reports ==
In 1874, the U.S. government created the United States Reports, and retroactively numbered older privately published case reports as part of the new series. As a result, cases appearing in volumes 1–90 of U.S. Reports have dual citation forms; one for the volume number of U.S. Reports, and one for the volume number of the reports named for the relevant reporter of decisions (these are called "nominative reports").

=== Benjamin Chew Howard ===
Starting with the 42nd volume of U.S. Reports, the Reporter of Decisions of the Supreme Court of the United States was Benjamin Chew Howard. Howard was Reporter of Decisions from 1843 to 1860, covering volumes 42 through 65 of United States Reports which correspond to volumes 1 through 24 of his Howard's Reports. As such, the dual form of citation to, for example, Iasigi v. Brown is 58 U.S. 183 (17 How.) (1855).

== Justices of the Supreme Court at the time of 58 U.S. (17 How.) ==
The Supreme Court is established by Article III, Section 1 of the Constitution of the United States, which says: "The judicial Power of the United States, shall be vested in one supreme Court . . .". The size of the Court is not specified; the Constitution leaves it to Congress to set the number of justices. Under the Judiciary Act of 1789 Congress originally fixed the number of justices at six (one chief justice and five associate justices). Since 1789 Congress has varied the size of the Court from six to seven, nine, ten, and back to nine justices (always including one chief justice).

When the cases in 58 U.S. (17 How.) were decided the Court comprised these nine members:

| Portrait | Justice | Office | Home State | Succeeded | Date confirmed by the Senate (Vote) | Tenure on Supreme Court |
|---|---|---|---|---|---|---|
| | Roger B. Taney | Chief Justice | Maryland | John Marshall | March 15, 1836 (29–15) | March 28, 1836 – October 12, 1864 (Died) |
| | John McLean | Associate Justice | Ohio | Robert Trimble | March 7, 1829 (Acclamation) | January 11, 1830 – April 4, 1861 (Died) |
| | James Moore Wayne | Associate Justice | Georgia | William Johnson | January 9, 1835 (Acclamation) | January 14, 1835 – July 5, 1867 (Died) |
| | John Catron | Associate Justice | Tennessee | newly created seat | March 8, 1837 (28–15) | May 1, 1837 – May 30, 1865 (Died) |
| | Peter Vivian Daniel | Associate Justice | Virginia | Philip P. Barbour | March 2, 1841 (25–5) | January 10, 1842 – May 31, 1860 (Died) |
| | Samuel Nelson | Associate Justice | New York | Smith Thompson | February 14, 1845 (Acclamation) | February 27, 1845 – November 28, 1872 (Retired) |
| | Robert Cooper Grier | Associate Justice | Pennsylvania | Henry Baldwin | August 4, 1846 (Acclamation) | August 10, 1846 – January 31, 1870 (Retired) |
| | Benjamin Robbins Curtis | Associate Justice | Massachusetts | Levi Woodbury | December 20, 1851 (Acclamation) | October 10, 1851 – September 30, 1857 (Resigned) |
| | John Archibald Campbell | Associate Justice | Alabama | John McKinley | March 22, 1853 (Acclamation) | April 11, 1853 – April 30, 1861 (Resigned) |

== Citation style ==
Under the Judiciary Act of 1789 the federal court structure at the time comprised District Courts, which had general trial jurisdiction; Circuit Courts, which had mixed trial and appellate (from the US District Courts) jurisdiction; and the United States Supreme Court, which had appellate jurisdiction over the federal District and Circuit courts—and for certain issues over state courts. The Supreme Court also had limited original jurisdiction (i.e., in which cases could be filed directly with the Supreme Court without first having been heard by a lower federal or state court). There were one or more federal District Courts and/or Circuit Courts in each state, territory, or other geographical region.

Bluebook citation style is used for case names, citations, and jurisdictions.

- "C.C.D." = United States Circuit Court for the District of . . .
  - e.g.,"C.C.D.N.J." = United States Circuit Court for the District of New Jersey
- "D." = United States District Court for the District of . . .
  - e.g.,"D. Mass." = United States District Court for the District of Massachusetts
- "E." = Eastern; "M." = Middle; "N." = Northern; "S." = Southern; "W." = Western
  - e.g.,"C.C.S.D.N.Y." = United States Circuit Court for the Southern District of New York
  - e.g.,"M.D. Ala." = United States District Court for the Middle District of Alabama
- "Ct. Cl." = United States Court of Claims
- The abbreviation of a state's name alone indicates the highest appellate court in that state's judiciary at the time.
  - e.g.,"Pa." = Supreme Court of Pennsylvania
  - e.g.,"Me." = Supreme Judicial Court of Maine

== List of cases in 58 U.S. (17 How.) ==
| Case Name | Page and year | Opinion of the Court | Concurring opinion(s) | Dissenting opinion(s) | Lower Court | Disposition |
|---|---|---|---|---|---|---|
| De la Lande's Heirs v. Louisiana | 1 (1855) | Taney | none | none | La. | dismissal denied |
| Shields v. Thomas | 3 (1855) | Taney | none | none | N.D. Iowa | dismissal denied |
| Arthurs v. Hart | 6 (1854) | Nelson | none | none | C.C.E.D. La. | reversed |
| The Steamship Ohio | 17 (1855) | McLean | none | none | C.C.S.D.N.Y. | dismissed |
| The Steamship Falcon | 19 (1855) | McLean | none | none | C.C.S.D.N.Y. | dismissed |
| Haydel v. Dufresne | 23 (1855) | Catron | none | none | La. | reversed |
| Northern Central Railway v. Winans | 30 (1854) | Campbell | none | none | C.C.E.D. Pa. | affirmed |
| United States v. Coxe | 41 (1855) | Taney | none | none | E.D. La. | reversed |
| Barribeau v. Brant | 43 (1854) | Taney | none | none | C.C.D. Mo. | dismissed |
| Wickliffe v. Owings | 47 (1855) | Campbell | none | none | C.C.D. Ky. | reversed |
| Raymond v. Tyson | 53 (1855) | Wayne | none | Campbell | N.D. Cal. | reversed |
| Burden Iron Works v. Odiorne | 72 (1854) | Catron | none | none | C.C.D. Mass. | affirmed |
| Battin v. Taggert | 74 (1854) | McLean | none | none | C.C.E.D. Pa. | reversed |
| United States v. 67 Packages of Dry Goods | 85 (1855) | Nelson | none | none | C.C.D. La. | reversed |
| United States v. Nine Cases of Silk Hats | 97 (1855) | Nelson | none | none | C.C.E.D. La. | reversed |
| United States v. One Package of Merchandise | 98 (1855) | Nelson | none | none | C.C.E.D. La. | reversed |
| United States v. One Case of Clocks | 99 (1855) | Nelson | none | none | C.C.E.D. La. | reversed |
| Lawrence v. Minturn | 100 (1855) | Curtis | none | none | N.D. Cal. | reversed |
| Stewart v. United States | 116 (1855) | Daniel | none | none | C.C.D.C. | affirmed |
| Shields v. Barrow | 130 (1855) | Curtis | none | none | C.C.E.D. La. | reversed |
| Ring v. Maxwell | 147 (1854) | Curtis | none | none | C.C.S.D.N.Y. | certification |
| The Propeller Monticello | 152 (1855) | Grier | none | Daniel | C.C.N.D.N.Y. | affirmed |
| Bank of Tennessee v. Horn | 157 (1855) | Taney | none | none | C.C.E.D. La. | affirmed |
| City of Providence v. Clapp | 161 (1855) | Nelson | none | none | C.C.D.R.I. | affirmed |
| The Schooner Catharine | 170 (1855) | Nelson | none | none | C.C.S.D.N.Y. | reversed |
| Peck v. Sanderson | 178 (1855) | Taney | none | none | C.C.E.D. Pa. | reversed |
| Iasigi v. Brown | 183 (1855) | McLean | none | Curtis; Campbell | C.C.D. Mass. | reversed |
| United States v. Nickerson | 204 (1855) | Curtis | none | none | C.C.D. Mass. | certification |
| Henshaw v. Miller | 212 (1855) | Daniel | none | none | C.C.E.D. Va. | certification |
| United States ex rel. Tucker v. Seaman | 225 (1855) | Taney | none | none | C.C.D.C. | affirmed |
| McBlair v. Gibbes | 232 (1855) | Nelson | none | none | C.C.D. Md. | affirmed |
| Williams v. Gibbes | 239 (1855) | Nelson | none | Taney; Daniel | C.C.D. Md. | reversed |
| Gooding v. Oliver | 274 (1855) | Nelson | none | none | C.C.D. Md. | reversed |
| Stafford v. Union Bank | 275 (1855) | McLean | none | none | D. Tex. | dismissed |
| Stafford v. New Orleans Canal and Banking Company | 283 (1855) | McLean | none | none | D. Tex. | dismissed |
| United States ex rel. Goodrich v. Guthrie | 284 (1855) | Daniel | Curtis | McLean | C.C.D.C. | affirmed |
| Clark v. Clark | 315 (1855) | Catron | none | none | C.C.D.C. | affirmed |
| Booth v. Clark | 322 (1855) | Wayne | none | none | C.C.D.C. | affirmed |
| Boone v. Missouri Iron Company | 340 (1855) | McLean | none | none | C.C.D. Mo. | affirmed |
| Burchell v. Marsh | 344 (1855) | Grier | none | Nelson | C.C.D. Ill. | reversed |
| Hinkle v. Wanzer | 353 (1855) | Daniel | none | none | C.C.S.D. Ala. | affirmed |
| Fontain v. Ravenel | 369 (1855) | McLean | Taney; Daniel | none | C.C.E.D. Pa. | affirmed |
| The Steamboat John Jay | 399 (1855) | Wayne | none | none | C.C.S.D.N.Y. | affirmed |
| West v. Cochran | 403 (1855) | Catron | McLean | none | C.C.D. Mo. | affirmed |
| Adams v. Law | 417 (1855) | Grier | none | none | C.C.D.C. | affirmed |
| Herndon v. Ridgway | 424 (1855) | Campbell | none | none | N.D. Miss. | affirmed |
| City of Boston v. Lecraw | 426 (1855) | Grier | none | none | C.C.D.R.I. | reversed |
| Bruce v. United States | 437 (1855) | Taney | none | none | C.C.D. Mo. | affirmed |
| Hendrickson v. Hinckley | 443 (1855) | Curtis | none | none | C.C.D. Ohio | affirmed |
| Stevens v. Gladding | 447 (1855) | Curtis | none | none | C.C.D.R.I. | reversed |
| Carpenter v. Pennsylvania | 456 (1855) | Campbell | none | none | Pa. | affirmed |
| Rhodes v. Farmer | 464 (1855) | McLean | none | none | N.D. Miss. | affirmed |
| Wickliffe v. Eve | 468 (1855) | Catron | none | none | C.C.D. Ky. | affirmed |
| Pulliam v. Osborne | 471 (1855) | Campbell | none | none | M.D. Ala. | reversed |
| Minturn v. Maynard | 477 (1855) | Grier | none | none | N.D. Cal. | affirmed |
| Florida v. Georgia | 478 (1855) | Taney | none | Curtis; Campbell | original | continued |
| United States v. Ritchie | 525 (1855) | Nelson | Campbell | none | N.D. Cal. | affirmed |
| Fremont v. United States | 542 (1855) | Taney | none | Catron; Campbell | N.D. Cal. | reversed |
| Webb v. Den | 576 (1854) | Grier | none | none | C.C.M.D. Tenn. | affirmed |
| Coy v. Mason | 580 (1855) | McLean | none | none | D. Iowa | affirmed |
| Wanzer v. Truly | 584 (1855) | Campbell | none | Daniel | C.C.S.D. Miss. | reversed |
| Ayres v. Carver | 591 (1855) | Nelson | Catron | none | N.D. Miss. | dismissed |
| Hays v. Pacific Mail Steamship Company | 596 (1855) | Nelson | Campbell | Daniel | N.D. Cal. | affirmed |
| Christy v. Alford | 601 (1855) | Curtis | none | none | D. Tex. | affirmed |
| Dennistoun v. Stewart | 606 (1855) | Grier | none | none | C.C.S.D. Ala. | reversed |
| Griffin v. Reynolds | 609 (1855) | Campbell | none | none | N.D. Miss. | reversed |
| Judson v. Corcoran | 612 (1855) | Catron | none | none | C.C.D.C. | affirmed |
| Lewis v. Bell | 616 (1855) | Grier | none | none | C.C.D.C. | affirmed |

== See also ==
certificate of division
