= List of United States Supreme Court cases, volume 225 =

Supreme Court of the United States
- Interactive map of Supreme Court of the United States
- 38°53′26″N 77°00′16″W
- Established: March 4, 1789; 236 years ago
- Location: Washington, D.C.
- Coordinates: 38°53′26″N 77°00′16″W
- Composition method: Presidential nomination with Senate confirmation
- Authorised by: Constitution of the United States, Art. III, § 1
- Judge term length: life tenure, subject to impeachment and removal
- Number of positions: 9 (by statute)
- Website: supremecourt.gov

This is a list of cases reported in volume 225 of United States Reports, decided by the Supreme Court of the United States in 1912.

== Justices of the Supreme Court at the time of volume 225 U.S. ==
The Supreme Court is established by Article III, Section 1 of the Constitution of the United States, which says: "The judicial Power of the United States, shall be vested in one supreme Court . . .". The size of the Court is not specified; the Constitution leaves it to Congress to set the number of justices. Under the Judiciary Act of 1789 Congress originally fixed the number of justices at six (one chief justice and five associate justices). Since 1789 Congress has varied the size of the Court from six to seven, nine, ten, and back to nine justices (always including one chief justice).

When the cases in volume 225 were decided the Court comprised the following nine members:

Portrait	Justice	Office	Home State	Succeeded	Date confirmed by the Senate (Vote)	Tenure on Supreme Court
	Edward Douglass White	Chief Justice	Louisiana	Melville Fuller	December 12, 1910 (Acclamation)	December 19, 1910 – May 19, 1921 (Died)
	Joseph McKenna	Associate Justice	California	Stephen Johnson Field	January 21, 1898 (Acclamation)	January 26, 1898 – January 5, 1925 (Retired)
	Oliver Wendell Holmes Jr.	Associate Justice	Massachusetts	Horace Gray	December 4, 1902 (Acclamation)	December 8, 1902 – January 12, 1932 (Retired)
	William R. Day	Associate Justice	Ohio	George Shiras Jr.	February 23, 1903 (Acclamation)	March 2, 1903 – November 13, 1922 (Retired)
	Horace Harmon Lurton	Associate Justice	Tennessee	Rufus W. Peckham	December 20, 1909 (Acclamation)	January 3, 1910 – July 12, 1914 (Died)
	Charles Evans Hughes	Associate Justice	New York	David Josiah Brewer	May 2, 1910 (Acclamation)	October 10, 1910 – June 10, 1916 (Resigned)
	Willis Van Devanter	Associate Justice	Wyoming	Edward Douglass White (as Associate Justice)	December 15, 1910 (Acclamation)	January 3, 1911 – June 2, 1937 (Retired)
	Joseph Rucker Lamar	Associate Justice	Georgia	William Henry Moody	December 15, 1910 (Acclamation)	January 3, 1911 – January 2, 1916 (Died)
	Mahlon Pitney	Associate Justice	New Jersey	John Marshall Harlan	March 13, 1912 (50–26)	March 18, 1912 – December 31, 1922 (Resigned)

== Notable Case in 225 U.S. ==
=== Hyde v. United States ===
Hyde v. United States, 225 U.S. 347 (1912), is a criminal case in which the Supreme Court interpreted attempt. The Court held that for an act to be a criminal attempt, it must be so near the result that the danger of its success must be very large. The Court wrote, "There must be a dangerous proximity to success."

== Citation style ==
Under the Judiciary Act of 1789 the federal court structure at the time comprised District Courts, which had general trial jurisdiction; Circuit Courts, which had mixed trial and appellate (from the US District Courts) jurisdiction; and the United States Supreme Court, which had appellate jurisdiction over the federal District and Circuit courts—and for certain issues over state courts. The Supreme Court also had limited original jurisdiction (i.e., in which cases could be filed directly with the Supreme Court without first having been heard by a lower federal or state court). There were one or more federal District Courts and/or Circuit Courts in each state, territory, or other geographical region.

The Judiciary Act of 1891 created the United States Courts of Appeals and reassigned the jurisdiction of most routine appeals from the district and circuit courts to these appellate courts. The Act created nine new courts that were originally known as the "United States Circuit Courts of Appeals." The new courts had jurisdiction over most appeals of lower court decisions. The Supreme Court could review either legal issues that a court of appeals certified or decisions of court of appeals by writ of certiorari.

On January 1, 1912, the effective date of the Judicial Code of 1911, the old Circuit Courts were abolished, with their remaining trial court jurisdiction transferred to the U.S. District Courts.

Bluebook citation style is used for case names, citations, and jurisdictions.

- "# Cir." = United States Court of Appeals
  - e.g., "3d Cir." = United States Court of Appeals for the Third Circuit
- "C.C.D." = United States Circuit Court for the District of . . .
  - e.g.,"C.C.D.N.J." = United States Circuit Court for the District of New Jersey
- "D." = United States District Court for the District of . . .
  - e.g.,"D. Mass." = United States District Court for the District of Massachusetts
- "E." = Eastern; "M." = Middle; "N." = Northern; "S." = Southern; "W." = Western
  - e.g.,"C.C.S.D.N.Y." = United States Circuit Court for the Southern District of New York
  - e.g.,"M.D. Ala." = United States District Court for the Middle District of Alabama
- "Ct. Cl." = United States Court of Claims
- The abbreviation of a state's name alone indicates the highest appellate court in that state's judiciary at the time.
  - e.g.,"Pa." = Supreme Court of Pennsylvania
  - e.g.,"Me." = Supreme Judicial Court of Maine

== List of cases in volume 225 U.S. ==
Case Name	Page and year	Opinion of the Court	Concurring opinion(s)	Dissenting opinion(s)	Lower Court	Disposition of case
Maryland v. West Virginia	1 (1912)	per curiam	none	none	original	border set
The Jason	32 (1912)	Pitney	none	none	2d Cir.	certification
Valdes v. Central Altagracia, Inc.	58 (1912)	White	none	none	D.P.R.	affirmed
Chase v. Wetzlar	79 (1912)	White	none	none	C.C.S.D.N.Y.	affirmed
Sexton v. Kessler and Company	90 (1912)	Holmes	none	none	2d Cir.	affirmed
Southern Railway Company v. Burlington Lumber Company	99 (1912)	Holmes	none	none	N.C.	reversed
Ohio Railroad Commission v. Worthington	101 (1912)	Day	none	none	6th Cir.	affirmed
Bigelow v. Old Dominion Copper Mining and Smelting Company	111 (1912)	Lurton	none	none	Mass.	affirmed
Stalker v. Oregon Short Line Railroad Company	142 (1912)	Lurton	none	none	Idaho	affirmed
Chicago and Alton Railroad Company v. Kirby	155 (1912)	Lurton	none	none	Ill.	reversed
Jordan v. Massachusetts	167 (1912)	Lurton	none	none	Mass. Super. Ct.	affirmed
National Bank v. National Herkimer County Bank of Little Falls	178 (1912)	Hughes	none	none	2d Cir.	affirmed
Anderson v. Pacific Coast Steamship Company	187 (1912)	Hughes	none	none	9th Cir.	certification
United States Fidelity and Guaranty Company v. Bray	205 (1912)	VanDevanter	none	none	4th Cir.	affirmed
United States v. Colorado Anthracite Company	219 (1912)	VanDevanter	none	none	Ct. Cl.	affirmed
Johannessen v. United States	227 (1912)	Pitney	none	none	N.D. Cal.	affirmed
R.J. Darnell (Inc.) v. Illinois Central Railroad Company	243 (1912)	White	none	none	C.C.W.D. Tenn.	dismissed
Creswill v. Knights of Pythias	246 (1912)	White	none	Holmes	Ga.	reversed
Norfolk and Suburban Turnpike Railroad Company v. Virginia	264 (1912)	White	none	none	Va.	affirmed
Mississippi Railroad Commission v. Louisville and Nashville Railroad Company	272 (1912)	White	none	none	C.C.D. Miss.	affirmed
Procter and Gamble Company v. United States	282 (1912)	White	none	none	Comm. Ct.	remanded
Hooker v. Knapp	302 (1912)	White	none	none	Comm. Ct.	remanded
United States v. Baltimore and Ohio Railroad Company	306 (1912)	White	none	none	Comm. Ct.	affirmed
ICC v. Baltimore and Ohio Railroad Company	326 (1912)	McKenna	none	none	Comm. Ct.	reversed
Hyde v. United States	347 (1912)	McKenna	none	Holmes	D.C. Cir.	affirmed
Brown v. Elliott	392 (1912)	McKenna	none	Holmes	C.C.N.D. Cal.	affirmed
Johnson v. United States	405 (1912)	McKenna	none	none	D.C. Cir.	affirmed
Glasgow v. Moyer	420 (1912)	McKenna	none	none	N.D. Ga.	affirmed
City of Louisville v. Cumberland Telephone and Telegraph Company	430 (1912)	Holmes	none	none	C.C.W.D. Ky.	reversed
Messenger v. Anderson	436 (1912)	Holmes	none	none	6th Cir.	reversed
Zeckendorf v. Steinfeld	445 (1912)	Holmes	none	none	6th Cir.	reversed
Low Wah Suey v. Backus	460 (1912)	Holmes	none	none	6th Cir.	reversed
Seaboard Air Line Railroad Company v. Duvall	477 (1912)	Holmes	none	none	6th Cir.	reversed
D. Lupton's Sons Company v. Automobile Club of America	489 (1912)	Hughes	none	none	C.C.S.D.N.Y.	reversed
Savage v. Jones	501 (1912)	Hughes	none	none	C.C.D. Ind.	affirmed
Standard Stock Food Company v. Wright	540 (1912)	Hughes	none	none	C.C.S.D. Iowa	affirmed
Clairmont v. United States	551 (1912)	Hughes	none	none	D. Mont.	reversed
Shulthis v. McDougal	561 (1912)	VanDevanter	none	none	8th Cir.	dismissed
Eastern Cherokees v. United States	572 (1912)	VanDevanter	none	none	Ct. Cl.	affirmed
Kindred v. Union Pacific Railroad Company	582 (1912)	VanDevanter	none	none	8th Cir.	affirmed
Flannelly v. Delaware and Hudson Company	597 (1912)	VanDevanter	none	none	3d Cir.	reversed
Westinghouse Electric and Manufacturing Company v. Wagner Electric and Manufacturing Company	604 (1912)	Lamar	none	none	8th Cir.	reversed
Murphy v. California	623 (1912)	Lamar	none	none	Cal. Super. Ct.	affirmed
Henderson v. Mayer	631 (1912)	Lamar	none	none	5th Cir.	affirmed
Atchison, Topeka and Santa Fe Railway Company v. United States	640 (1912)	Lamar	none	none	C.C.D. Kan.	affirmed
Pickford v. Talbott	651 (1912)	Pitney	none	none	D.C. Cir.	affirmed
Ex parte Webb	663 (1912)	Pitney	none	none	E.D. Okla.	habeas corpus denied
