= Arkansas v. Tennessee =

- Supreme Court of the United States

Argued January 19, 1970 Decided February 25, 1970
- Full case name: Arkansas v. Tennessee
- Citations: 397 U.S. 88 (more) 90 S. Ct. 784; 25 L. Ed. 2d 73

Case history
- Prior: Special master appointed, Arkansas v. Tennessee, 389 U.S. 1026 (1968).

Court membership
- Chief Justice Warren E. Burger Associate Justices Hugo Black · William O. Douglas; John M. Harlan II · William J. Brennan Jr. Potter Stewart · Byron White; Thurgood Marshall

Arkansas v. Tennessee, 397 U.S. 88 (1970), was a case decided by the United States Supreme Court to settle a dispute between the states of Arkansas and Tennessee as to where a portion of the boundary line between the states should run.

== Facts ==
Arkansas initiated the action on October 13, 1967, with respect to an area extending six miles laterally along the west (Arkansas side) bank of the Mississippi River, encompassing approximately five thousand acres. The area, known as Cow Island Bend in the Mississippi River, was located between Crittenden County, Arkansas, and Shelby County, Tennessee. The case was brought under the court's original jurisdiction under Art. III, § 2, of the Constitution of the United States.

== Procedure ==
On January 15, 1968, the court appointed Gunnar Nordbye, a Senior United States Judge of the District of Minnesota, as Special Master to determine the state line in the disputed area. Nordbye conducted an evidentiary hearing and viewed the area. He then filed his report with the Supreme Court recommending that all of the disputed area be declared part of the State of Tennessee.

== Result ==
The parties had agreed that the state line was the thalweg, or steamboat channel, of the Mississippi River as it flows west and southward between the states. Nordbye heard evidence and was presented exhibits and maps which showed that the migration of the Mississippi River northward and west continued until about 1912. At that time, an avulsion occurred leaving Tennessee lands on the west or Arkansas side of the new or avulsive river channel. Nordbye found that, thereafter, because of the avulsion, the water in the thalweg became stagnant, and erosion and accretion no longer occurred. At this time, the boundary between Arkansas and Tennessee became fixed in the middle of the old abandoned channel. The Supreme Court affirmed this finding, quoting from its opinion in an earlier dispute between the same states where it had held:

It is settled beyond the possibility of dispute that, where running streams are the boundaries between States, the same rule applies as between private proprietors, namely, that, when the bed and channel are changed by the natural and gradual processes known as erosion and accretion, the boundary follows the varying course of the stream; while, if the stream from any cause, natural or artificial, suddenly leaves its old bed and forms a new one, by the process known as an avulsion, the resulting change of channel works no change of boundary, which remains in the middle of the old channel, although no water may be flowing in it, and irrespective of subsequent changes in the new channel.

Nordbye was then further authorized to engage surveyors to determine the exact line of the boundary, with the states to split the cost. A decree establishing the surveyed boundary line was entered on June 23, 1970.
