= Piscataqua River border dispute =

Boundary dispute between the U.S. states of Maine and New Hampshire

Coordinates: 43°04′47″N 70°44′02″W

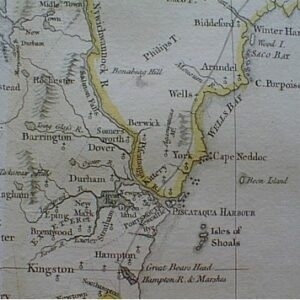
A 1761 map, prepared for the Privy Council of George III, inspired New Hampshire's 2001 lawsuit.

The Piscataqua River border dispute was a dispute between the US states of Maine and New Hampshire over ownership of Seavey's Island in the Piscataqua River, which forms the border between Maine and New Hampshire. In 2002, the US Supreme Court dismissed a lawsuit by New Hampshire claiming the entire harbor up to the Kittery shore. The issue remains a recurring political dispute, especially in the New Hampshire House of Representatives.

== Background ==
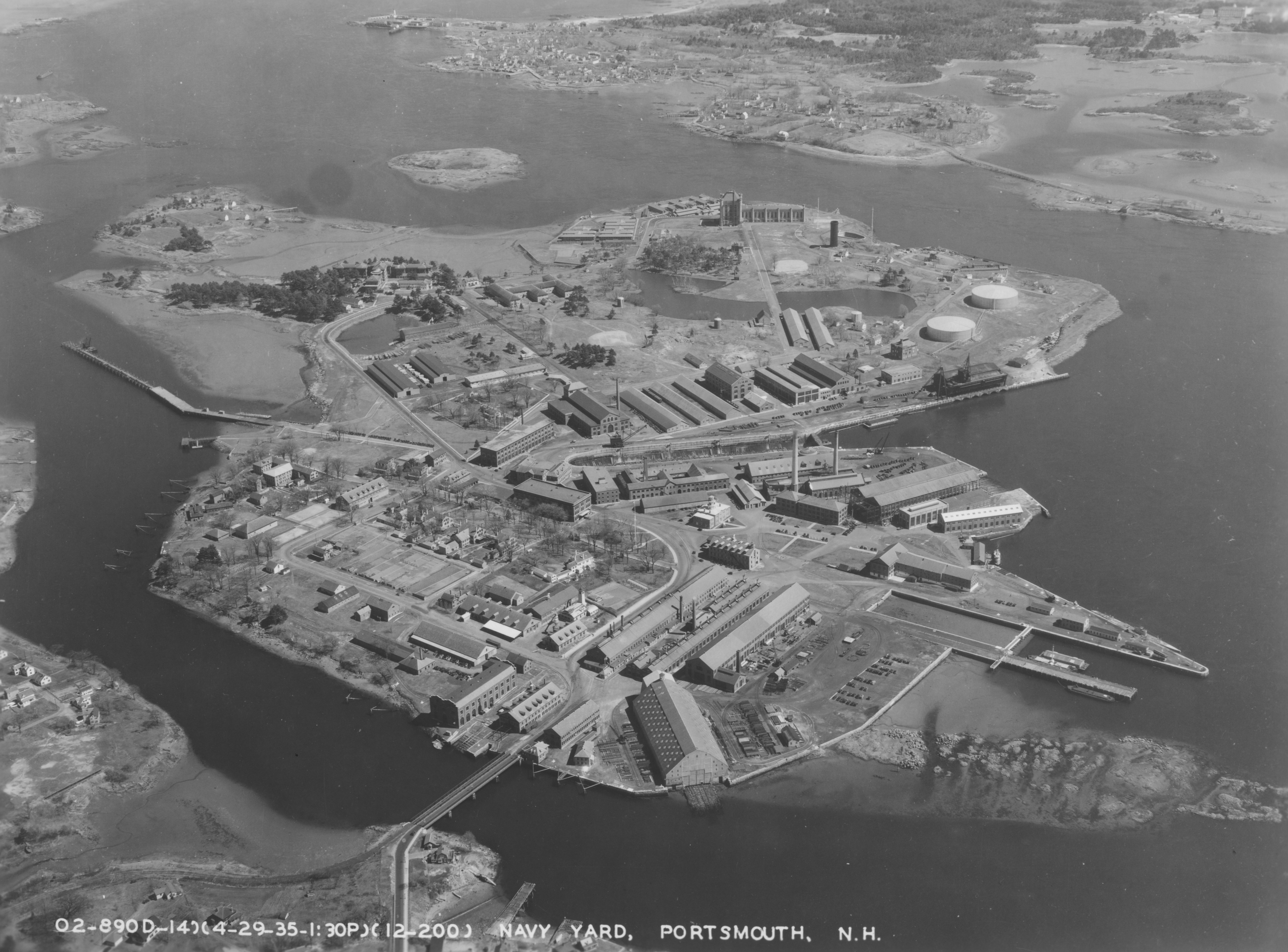
An aerial view of the Portsmouth Naval Shipyard from the 1930s. The photo is taken from the Maine side—land visible at the top-right of the photo is in New Hampshire.

Seavey's Island lies in the northern side of the Piscataqua River, between the town of Kittery, Maine, and the city of Portsmouth, New Hampshire. The island was originally five separate islands which were conjoined between 1800 and 1866 in order to build a naval shipyard. The State of Maine asserted that the boundary between the states runs along the middle of the river to the south of Seavey's Island, which places the island within Maine. The State of New Hampshire asserted a historical claim to ownership of the river up to the shoreline on the Maine side, which would place the island within New Hampshire.

Defenders of New Hampshire's claim point to New Hampshire's control of the harbor during the American Revolutionary War, including its construction of a fort named for John Sullivan (general) on Seavey's Island, and the appearance of Badger's Island on the Flag and seal of New Hampshire. Since the Supreme Court's 2002 decision, Badger's Island has been treated as part of Maine.

After building Fort Sullivan, New Hampshire used the fort to control trade and ship traffic in the harbor until the federal government took over harbor controls in 1896. Since that year, the United States federal government has owned Seavey's Island, which is the site of the Portsmouth Naval Shipyard. For many years, the U.S. Navy regarded the shipyard as belonging to New Hampshire (whence the name Portsmouth Naval Shipyard after the city of Portsmouth, New Hampshire). Later, the Navy adopted a neutral position in the dispute.

Maine imposes an income tax on workers who work in Maine irrespective of where they live, if they work in Maine at least 12 days and earn at least $3,000. This includes workers at the shipyard, many of whom who live in New Hampshire, which has no income tax. Moreover, aspects of the income tax are based on household income and result in larger payments due to the earnings of spouses who neither live nor work in Maine. New Hampshire contended that since the workers live in New Hampshire, paying taxes to Maine amounted to "taxation without representation". Maine receives an estimated $4 million to $6 million per year in taxes from the shipyard workers.

In 1997, Maine began to employ garnishment to collect the back taxes of shipyard workers who lived in New Hampshire. The same year, New Hampshire governor Jeanne Shaheen, while on a trade mission to Winchester, viewed a 1761 map allegedly showing that the Province of New Hampshire owned the entire harbor. The discovery of this map reportedly inspired Shaheen to pursue original jurisdiction litigation against Maine.

== Supreme Court case ==
In March 2000, New Hampshire filed a lawsuit in the Supreme Court against Maine, claiming ownership of the island. According to the US Constitution, the Supreme Court has original jurisdiction in cases "in which a State shall be a Party".

In 1977, New Hampshire had sued Maine (see New Hampshire v. Maine) over lobster fishing rights in the littoral waters off the Piscataqua River. In that case the Supreme Court entered a consent decree between the states, in which they agreed that the "middle of the river" was defined as the thalweg – "the middle of the main channel of navigation of the Piscataqua River". The settlement was based on a 1740 decree by King George II, defining the border between the Province of New Hampshire and York County, Massachusetts (now western Maine) as the middle of the main navigation channel. The 1977 case, however, was concerned only with the "lateral marine boundary" (littoral waters) between the mouth of the river and the Isles of Shoals, and did not strictly address the inland boundaries between the states.

Maine responded to the 2001 suit with a request to dismiss based on the principle of res judicata, arguing that the 1740 decision and the outcome of the 1977 case barred New Hampshire from filing another border complaint. Indeed, the case was dismissed on procedural grounds, not decided on the arguments.

On May 29, 2001, Justice Ruth Bader Ginsburg delivered the 8–0 decision of the Court. (Justice Souter recused himself from the decision; although justices often do not disclose their reasons for recusal, it is most likely because he had been the Attorney General of New Hampshire and later an associate justice of the New Hampshire Supreme Court in the 1970s and 1980s.) Justice Ginsburg wrote that "judicial estoppel bars New Hampshire from asserting that the Piscataqua River boundary runs along the Maine shore". Under the judicial estoppel doctrine, "Where a party assumes a certain position in a legal proceeding, and succeeds in maintaining that position, he may not thereafter, simply because his interests have changed, assume a contrary position, especially if it be to the prejudice of the party who has acquiesced in the position formerly taken by him". Put simply: Since New Hampshire had agreed in 1977 that the border runs along the middle of the river, New Hampshire may not now claim that the border runs along the Maine riverbank. Wrote Justice Ginsburg: "New Hampshire's claim that the Piscataqua River boundary runs along the Maine shore is clearly inconsistent with its interpretation of the words 'Middle of the River' during the 1970s litigation."

New Hampshire appealed the dismissal and requested the Court to reconsider its dismissal, but the Court denied the motion to reconsider.

== Later developments ==
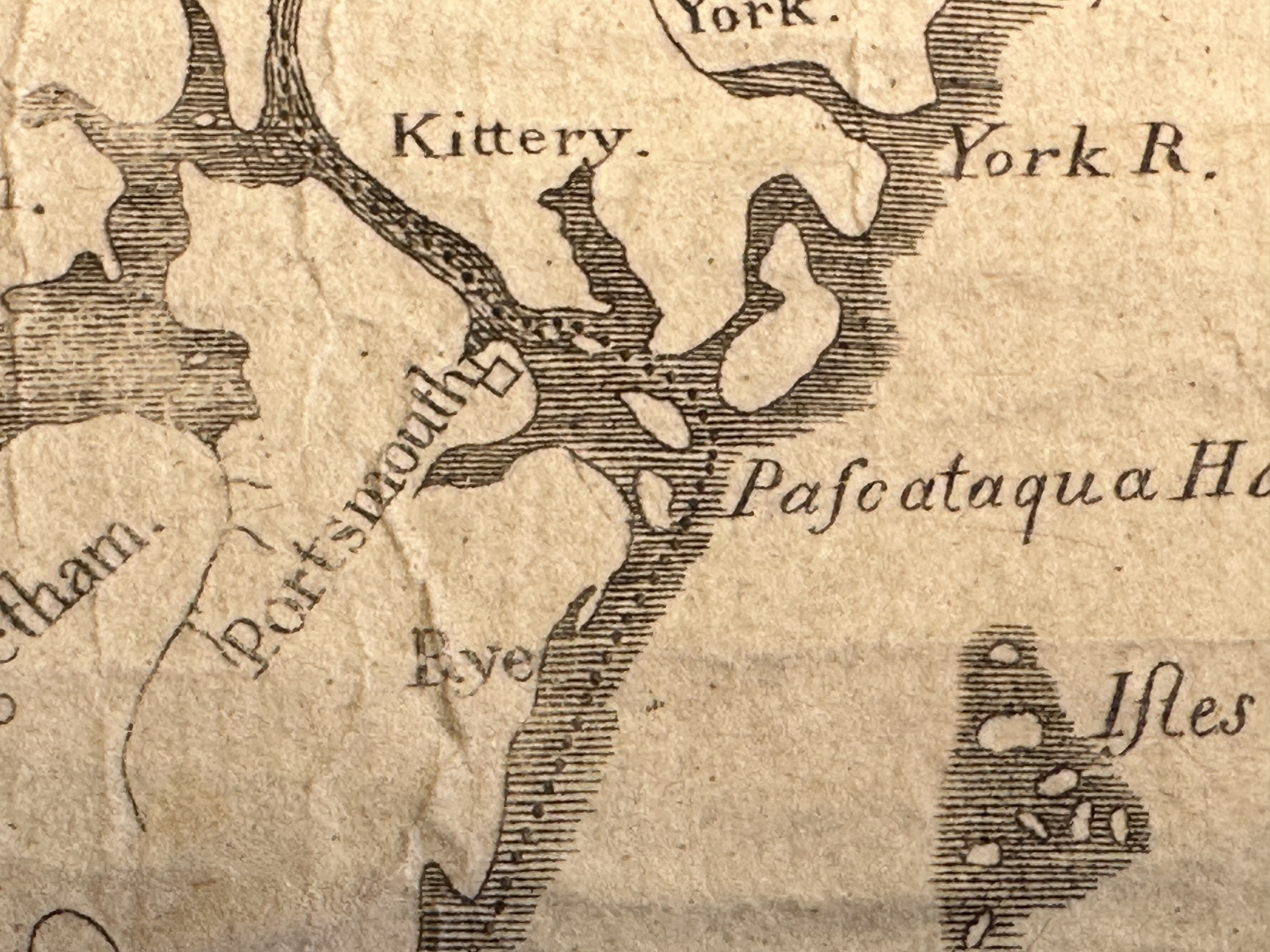
A 1791 map of New Hampshire counties, published in the New Hampshire Bar News in 2026, allegedly shows that Rockingham County included the islands in the harbor.

In January 2025, five members of the New Hampshire General Court (the state legislature) introduced House Concurrent Resolution 8, which, if passed, would call on the U.S. Congress to "find that the Piscataqua River and Portsmouth Harbor lie within the state of New Hampshire" and would ask the president "to take such action as to designate the duty stations of all Portsmouth Naval Shipyard personnel as Portsmouth, New Hampshire." The resolution would need to pass both houses of the state legislature and then be signed by the governor of New Hampshire in order to be adopted.

In 2026, the New Hampshire House passed a House resolution again asking the president to change the Naval Shipyard duty stations.

== See also ==
- New Hampshire Revised Statutes Annotated regarding New Hampshire's borders with Maine and other states
