= Florida v. Georgia (1855) =

- Supreme Court of the United States

Argued January 8–9, 1855 Decided March 6, 1855
- Full case name: The State of Florida, Complainant v. The State of Georgia
- Citations: 58 U.S. 478 (more) 17 How. 478; 15 L. Ed. 181; 1854 U.S. LEXIS 538

Holding
- The boundary between the State of Florida and the State of Georgia runs along "McNeil's line" according to the survey conducted on behalf of the U.S. government.

Court membership
- Chief Justice Roger B. Taney Associate Justices John McLean · James M. Wayne; John Catron · Peter V. Daniel; Samuel Nelson · Robert C. Grier; Benjamin R. Curtis · John A. Campbell

Case opinions
- Majority: Taney, joined by Wayne, Catron, Nelson, Grier
- Dissent: Curtis, joined by McLean
- Dissent: Campbell, joined by Daniel

Laws applied
- 28 U.S.C. § 1251; Art. I, Art, X U.S. Constitution

Florida v. Georgia, 58 U.S. (17 How.) 478 (1854), was a United States Supreme Court case invoking the Court's original jurisdiction to determine boundary disputes between states. In this case the boundary dispute was between the State of Florida and the State of Georgia.

== Background ==
Florida claimed that the state line was a straight line (called McNeil's line, for the man who surveyed it for the U.S. government in 1825) from the confluence of Georgia's Chattahoochee and Flint rivers (forming the Apalachicola River, at a point now under Lake Seminole), then very slightly south of due east to the source of the St. Mary's River, which was the point specified in Pinckney's Treaty in 1795. That eastern point of the straight line was near Ellicott mound, which was erected in 1799 at "about 30° 34' N." The McNeil line was looked upon for more than 20 years as the proper location of the boundary.

Georgia claimed that the headwaters of the St. Mary's River were at the source of the southern branch, some 30 miles or nearly 50 kilometers south, at Lake Spalding or Lake Randolph. If upheld, Georgia would have obtained additional territory estimated at 800 to 2,355 square miles. The position of the U.S. commissioners was that the actual source of the St. Mary's was two miles north of the Ellicott mound.

Other Supreme Court cases involving Georgia boundary disputes include: State of Alabama v. State of Georgia, 64 U.S. 505 (1860), and two Georgia v. South Carolina cases in 1922 and 1990.

== Opinion of the Court ==
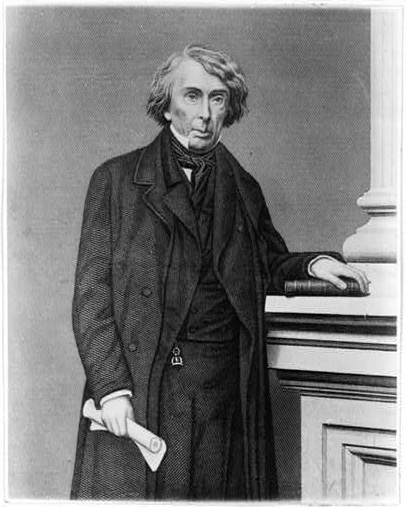

Chief Justice Taney delivered the opinion of the Court, ruling in favor of Florida and setting the state boundary line along "McNeil's line." This outcome was followed in 1859 by the surveying of the Orr and Whitner line. On April 9, 1872, Congress approved the Orr and Whitner Line as part of the border between Georgia and Florida.

=== Dissent ===
Justice Curtis, joined by Justices McLean, Daniel and Campbell, delivered the dissenting opinion, asserting that the United States was effectively made a party through the Attorney General, and such intervention by the United States government was an impermissible intervention in matters of the individual states.

== See also ==
- New Hampshire v. Maine
- New Mexico v. Texas
