= List of United States Supreme Court cases, volume 275 =

Supreme Court of the United States
- Interactive map of Supreme Court of the United States
- 38°53′26″N 77°00′16″W
- Established: March 4, 1789; 236 years ago
- Location: Washington, D.C.
- Coordinates: 38°53′26″N 77°00′16″W
- Composition method: Presidential nomination with Senate confirmation
- Authorised by: Constitution of the United States, Art. III, § 1
- Judge term length: life tenure, subject to impeachment and removal
- Number of positions: 9 (by statute)
- Website: supremecourt.gov

This is a list of cases reported in volume 275 of United States Reports, decided by the Supreme Court of the United States in 1927 and 1928.

== Justices of the Supreme Court at the time of volume 275 U.S. ==
The Supreme Court is established by Article III, Section 1 of the Constitution of the United States, which says: "The judicial Power of the United States, shall be vested in one supreme Court . . .". The size of the Court is not specified; the Constitution leaves it to Congress to set the number of justices. Under the Judiciary Act of 1789 Congress originally fixed the number of justices at six (one chief justice and five associate justices). Since 1789 Congress has varied the size of the Court from six to seven, nine, ten, and back to nine justices (always including one chief justice).

When the cases in volume 275 were decided the Court comprised the following nine members:

Portrait	Justice	Office	Home State	Succeeded	Date confirmed by the Senate (Vote)	Tenure on Supreme Court
	William Howard Taft	Chief Justice	Connecticut	Edward Douglass White	June 30, 1921 (Acclamation)	July 11, 1921 – February 3, 1930 (Retired)
	Oliver Wendell Holmes Jr.	Associate Justice	Massachusetts	Horace Gray	December 4, 1902 (Acclamation)	December 8, 1902 – January 12, 1932 (Retired)
	Willis Van Devanter	Associate Justice	Wyoming	Edward Douglass White (as Associate Justice)	December 15, 1910 (Acclamation)	January 3, 1911 – June 2, 1937 (Retired)
	James Clark McReynolds	Associate Justice	Tennessee	Horace Harmon Lurton	August 29, 1914 (44–6)	October 12, 1914 – January 31, 1941 (Retired)
	Louis Brandeis	Associate Justice	Massachusetts	Joseph Rucker Lamar	June 1, 1916 (47–22)	June 5, 1916 – February 13, 1939 (Retired)
	George Sutherland	Associate Justice	Utah	John Hessin Clarke	September 5, 1922 (Acclamation)	October 2, 1922 – January 17, 1938 (Retired)
	Pierce Butler	Associate Justice	Minnesota	William R. Day	December 21, 1922 (61–8)	January 2, 1923 – November 16, 1939 (Died)
	Edward Terry Sanford	Associate Justice	Tennessee	Mahlon Pitney	January 29, 1923 (Acclamation)	February 19, 1923 – March 8, 1930 (Died)
	Harlan F. Stone	Associate Justice	New York	Joseph McKenna	February 5, 1925 (71–6)	March 2, 1925 – July 2, 1941 (Continued as chief justice)

== Notable Case in 275 U.S. ==
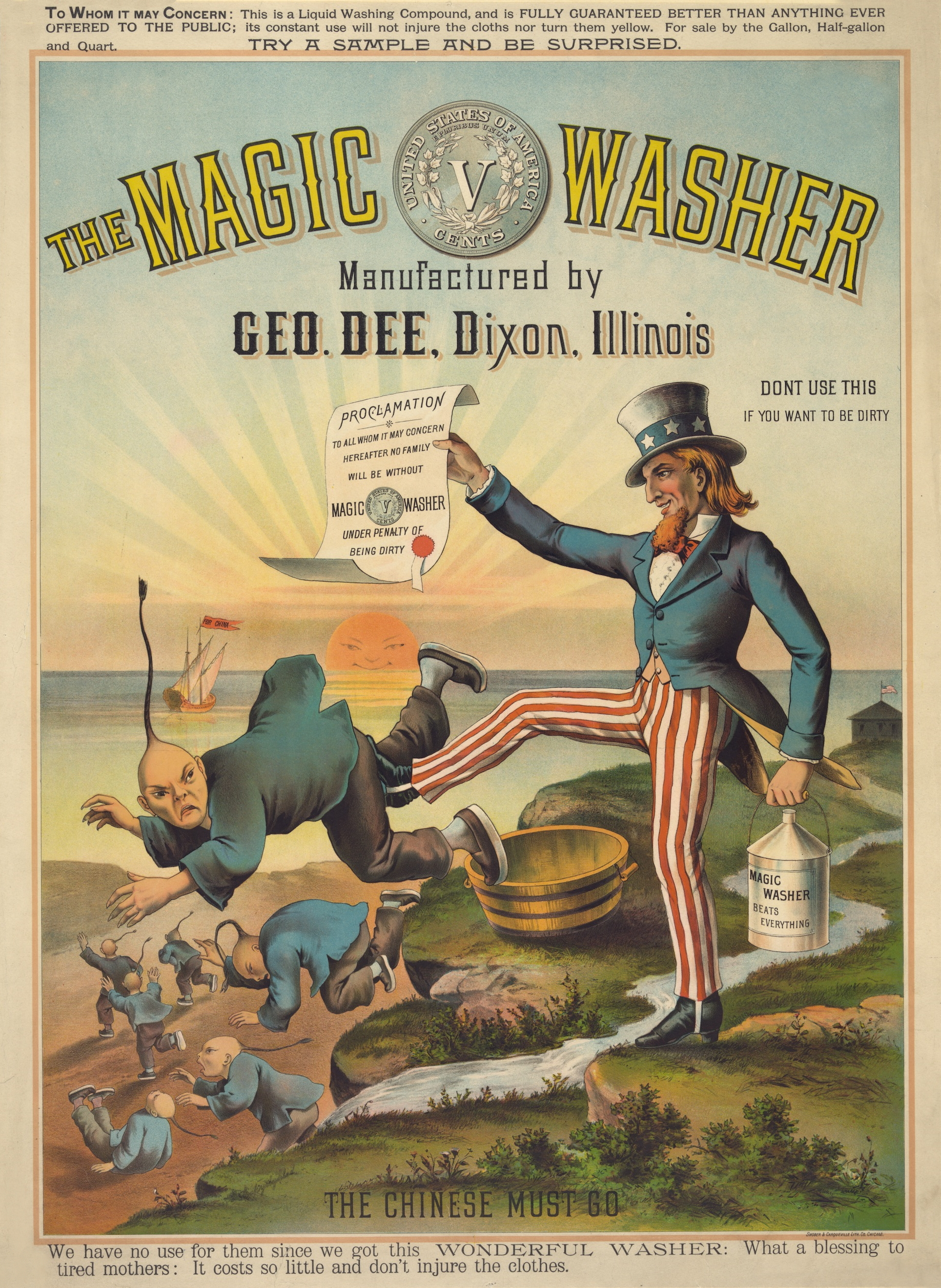
An 1886 advertisement for "Magic Washer" detergent: The Chinese Must Go

=== Lum v. Rice ===
In Lum v. Rice, 275 U.S. 78 (1927), the Supreme Court upheld blatant de jure discrimination against Asian-Americans, holding that the exclusion on account of race of a child of Chinese ancestry from a public school did not violate the Fourteenth Amendment to the United States Constitution. The decision effectively approved the exclusion of any minority children from schools reserved for whites. Earl Brewer, a former governor of Mississippi, represented the Lums, arguing that forcing their girls to attend the inferior school for non-white children violated their Fourteenth Amendment rights, and that since they were not Black they should be allowed to attend the schools for whites. He was able to win the writ of mandamus they sought, but then the school district appealed to the Mississippi Supreme Court which unanimously reversed the lower court, holding that Mississippi's constitution and laws clearly distinguished Asians ("Mongolians", it called them) from whites, so the Lums could not attend white schools. On review in the U.S. Supreme Court, Chief Justice William Howard Taft's unanimous opinion ended with a pronouncement that all racial segregation in schools was constitutional. While it was overturned by Brown v. Board of Education a quarter-century later, it gave greater legal foundation to educational segregation in the short term and set back efforts to end it. It is remembered today for increasing the scope of permissible segregation. Historian and educator James Loewen called Lum "the most racist Supreme Court decision in the twentieth century". Legal scholar Jamal Greene has called it an "ugly and unfortunate" decision. "The Court's ruling had established a precedent more powerful than the Lum family could have imagined", observed Adrienne Berard, in Water Tossing Boulders, a history of the case. "By fighting, they had only made the enemy stronger."

== Citation style ==
Under the Judiciary Act of 1789 the federal court structure at the time comprised District Courts, which had general trial jurisdiction; Circuit Courts, which had mixed trial and appellate (from the US District Courts) jurisdiction; and the United States Supreme Court, which had appellate jurisdiction over the federal District and Circuit courts—and for certain issues over state courts. The Supreme Court also had limited original jurisdiction (i.e., in which cases could be filed directly with the Supreme Court without first having been heard by a lower federal or state court). There were one or more federal District Courts and/or Circuit Courts in each state, territory, or other geographical region.

The Judiciary Act of 1891 created the United States Courts of Appeals and reassigned the jurisdiction of most routine appeals from the district and circuit courts to these appellate courts. The Act created nine new courts that were originally known as the "United States Circuit Courts of Appeals." The new courts had jurisdiction over most appeals of lower court decisions. The Supreme Court could review either legal issues that a court of appeals certified or decisions of court of appeals by writ of certiorari. On January 1, 1912, the effective date of the Judicial Code of 1911, the old Circuit Courts were abolished, with their remaining trial court jurisdiction transferred to the U.S. District Courts.

Bluebook citation style is used for case names, citations, and jurisdictions.

- "# Cir." = United States Court of Appeals
  - e.g., "3d Cir." = United States Court of Appeals for the Third Circuit
- "D." = United States District Court for the District of . . .
  - e.g.,"D. Mass." = United States District Court for the District of Massachusetts
- "E." = Eastern; "M." = Middle; "N." = Northern; "S." = Southern; "W." = Western
  - e.g.,"M.D. Ala." = United States District Court for the Middle District of Alabama
- "Ct. Cl." = United States Court of Claims
- The abbreviation of a state's name alone indicates the highest appellate court in that state's judiciary at the time.
  - e.g.,"Pa." = Supreme Court of Pennsylvania
  - e.g.,"Me." = Supreme Judicial Court of Maine

== List of cases in volume 275 U.S. ==
Case Name	Page and year	Opinion of the Court	Concurring opinion(s)	Dissenting opinion(s)	Lower Court	Disposition
United States ex rel. Skinner and Eddy Corporation v. McCarl	1 (1927)	Brandeis	none	none	D.C. Cir.	affirmed
Mammoth Oil Company v. United States	13 (1927)	Butler	none	none	8th Cir.	affirmed
Smallwood v. Gallardo	56 (1927)	Holmes	none	none	1st Cir.	reversed
Gallardo v. Santini Fertilizer Company	62 (1927)	Holmes	none	none	D.P.R.	reversed
Atlantic Coast Line Railroad Company v. Southwell	64 (1927)	Holmes	none	none	N.C.	reversed
Baltimore and Ohio Railroad Company v. Goodman	66 (1927)	Holmes	none	none	6th Cir.	reversed
Fairmont Creamery Company v. Minnesota	70 (1927)	Taft	none	none	original	taxing costs denied
Lum v. Rice	78 (1927)	Taft	none	none	Miss.	affirmed
Compañía General de Tabacos v. Collector	87 (1927)	Taft	none	Holmes	Phil.	multiple
Wickwire v. Reinecke	101 (1927)	Taft	none	none	7th Cir.	reversed
Segurola v. United States	106 (1927)	Taft	none	none	1st Cir.	affirmed
Simmons v. Swan	113 (1927)	Holmes	none	none	1st Cir.	reversed
Mercantile Trust Company v. Wilmot Road District	117 (1927)	Holmes	none	none	8th Cir.	reversed
Leach and Company v. Peirson	120 (1927)	Holmes	none	none	3d Cir.	reversed
Millsaps College v. City of Jackson	129 (1927)	McReynolds	none	none	Miss.	affirmed
Gulf, Colorado and Santa Fe Railway Company v. Moser	133 (1927)	McReynolds	none	none	Tex. Civ. App.	reversed
Northwestern Mutual Life Insurance Company v. Wisconsin	136 (1927)	McReynolds	none	none	Wis.	reversed
Blodgett v. Holden	142 (1927)	McReynolds	Holmes	none	6th Cir.	certification
United States v. Berkeness	149 (1927)	McReynolds	none	none	9th Cir.	affirmed
St. Louis–San Francisco Railway Company v. Spiller	156 (1927)	Brandeis	none	none	original	amendment denied
Chicago, Burlington and Quincy Railroad Company v. Wells Dickey Trust Company	161 (1927)	Brandeis	none	none	Minn.	reversed
City of Hammond v. Schappi Bus Line, Inc.	164 (1927)	Brandeis	none	none	7th Cir.	decree modified
City of Hammond v. Farina Bus Line Transportation Company	173 (1927)	Brandeis	none	none	7th Cir.	decree modified
Mason v. Routzahn	175 (1927)	Brandeis	none	none	6th Cir.	reversed
News Syndicate Company v. New York Central Railroad Company	179 (1927)	Butler	none	none	7th Cir.	certification
Atwater and Company v. United States	188 (1927)	Butler	none	none	Ct. Cl.	affirmed
Marron v. United States	192 (1927)	Butler	none	none	9th Cir.	affirmed
Steele v. Drummond	199 (1927)	Butler	none	none	5th Cir.	affirmed
Washington ex rel. Stimson Lumber Company v. Kuykendall	207 (1927)	Butler	none	none	Wash.	affirmed
Mellon v. O'Neil	212 (1927)	Sanford	none	none	N.Y. Sup. Ct.	dismissed
Willcuts v. Milton Dairy Company	215 (1927)	Sanford	none	none	8th Cir.	reversed
Blair v. Oesterlein Machine Company	220 (1927)	Stone	none	none	D.C. Cir.	affirmed
Tucker v. Alexander	228 (1927)	Stone	none	none	8th Cir.	reversed
Heiner v. Colonial Trust Company	232 (1927)	Stone	none	none	3d Cir.	reversed
Kansas City Southern Railway Company v. Ellzey	236 (1927)	Stone	none	none	5th Cir.	reversed
Lewellyn v. Electricity Reduction Company	243 (1927)	Stone	none	none	3d Cir.	reversed
Equitable Trust Company v. Rochling	248 (1927)	Stone	none	none	2d Cir.	reversed
Latzko v. Equitable Trust Company	254 (1927)	Stone	none	none	2d Cir.	reversed
Atlantic Coast Line Railroad Company v. Standard Oil Company	257 (1927)	Taft	none	none	6th Cir.	multiple
Bothwell v. Buckbee Mears Company	274 (1927)	Brandeis	none	none	Minn.	affirmed
New Mexico v. Texas	279 (1927)	Sanford	none	none	original	boundary set
Robins Dry Dock Repair Company v. Flint	303 (1927)	Holmes	none	none	2d Cir.	reversed
Gambino v. United States	310 (1927)	Brandeis	none	none	2d Cir.	reversed
Temco Electric Motor Company v. Apco Manufacturing Company	319 (1928)	Taft	none	none	5th Cir.	reversed
Richmond Screw Anchor Company v. United States	331 (1928)	Taft	none	none	Ct. Cl.	reversed
United States v. Murray	347 (1928)	Taft	none	none	5th Cir.	multiple
Equitable Trust Company v. First National Bank	359 (1928)	Holmes	none	Stone	2d Cir.	reversed
Barber Asphalt Paving Company v. Standard Asphalt and Rubber Company	372 (1928)	VanDevanter	none	none	7th Cir.	reversed
The Steel Trader	388 (1928)	McReynolds	none	none	5th Cir.	reversed
Hopkins v. Southern California Telephone Company	393 (1928)	McReynolds	none	none	9th Cir.	affirmed
Cleveland, Cincinnati, Chicago and St. Louis Railway Company v. United States	404 (1928)	Brandeis	none	none	N.D. Ill.	affirmed
Emergency Fleet Corporation v. Western Union Telegraph Company	415 (1928)	Brandeis	none	none	D.C. Cir.	reversed
Missouri Pacific Railroad Company v. Aeby	426 (1928)	Butler	none	none	Mo.	reversed
N. and G. Taylor Company, Inc. v. Anderson	431 (1928)	Butler	none	none	7th Cir.	affirmed
Aetna Life Insurance Co. v. Hyde	440 (1928)	Butler	none	none	Mo.	dismissed
Roche v. McDonald	449 (1928)	Sanford	none	none	Wash.	reversed
Gulf, Mobile and Northern Railroad Company v. Wells	455 (1928)	Sanford	none	none	Miss.	reversed
Mellon v. Arkansas Land and Lumber Company	460 (1928)	Sanford	none	none	Ark.	reversed
Jackson v. Steamship Archimedes	463 (1928)	Sanford	none	none	2d Cir.	affirmed
Ingram Day Lumber Company v. McLouth	471 (1928)	Stone	none	none	6th Cir.	reversed
Nagle v. Loi Hoa	475 (1928)	Stone	none	none	9th Cir.	reversed
E.W. Bliss Company v. United States	509 (1927)	per curiam	none	none	Ct. Cl.	reversed
