= Hyde v. United States =

- Supreme Court of the United States

Argued October 23–24, 1911 Reargued May 3, 1912 Decided June 10, 1912
- Full case name: Hyde and Schneider v. United States
- Citations: 225 U.S. 347 (more) 32 S. Ct. 793; 56 L. Ed. 1114

Court membership
- Chief Justice Edward D. White Associate Justices Joseph McKenna · Oliver W. Holmes Jr. William R. Day · Horace H. Lurton; Charles E. Hughes · Willis Van Devanter; Joseph R. Lamar · Mahlon Pitney

Case opinions
- Majority: McKenna, joined by White, Day, Devanter, Pitney
- Dissent: Holmes, joined by Lurton, Hughes, Lamar

Hyde v. United States, 225 U.S. 347 (1912), is a United States Supreme Court criminal case interpreting attempt. The court held that for an act to be a criminal attempt, it must be so near the result that the danger of its success must be very large. The case is notable for Justice Oliver Wendell Holmes's formulation in the dissent that attempt is present when a defendant's conduct bears "a dangerous proximity to success."
