= Acquiescence =

Legal concept

In law, acquiescence occurs when a person knowingly stands by, without raising any objection to the infringement of their rights, while someone else unknowingly and without malice aforethought acts in a manner inconsistent with their rights. As a result of acquiescence, the person whose rights are infringed may lose the ability to make a legal claim against the infringer, or may be unable to obtain an injunction against continued infringement. The doctrine infers a form of "permission" that results from silence or passiveness over an extended period of time.

Although not typically found in statutory law, the doctrine of acquiescence is well-supported by case law. One common context in which acquiescence is raised is when there is a dispute or disagreement over the location of a property line, followed by an extended period of time during which the parties respect a property line. Even if it is later discovered that the actual property line was in a different location, the long-term acquiescence to the incorrectly placed line may result in its becoming enforceable as the legal property line.

An example of the law of acquiescence occurred in a dispute between the State of Georgia and the State of South Carolina, in which the Supreme Court of the United States held that Georgia could no longer make any claim to an island in the Savannah River, despite the 1787 Treaty of Beaufort's assignment to the contrary. The court said that Georgia had knowingly allowed South Carolina to join the island as a peninsula to its own coast by dumping sand from dredging, and to then levy property taxes on it for decades. Georgia thereby lost the island-turned-peninsula by its own acquiescence, even though the treaty had given it all of the islands in the river.

== Similar legal doctrines ==
Doctrines similar to acquiescence include:

- The common law doctrine of estoppel (also known in civil law as venire contra factum proprium non potest). A claim of estoppel may arise when one party gives legal notice to a second party of a fact or claim, and the second party fails to challenge or refute that claim within a reasonable time. The second party may be said to have acquiesced to the claim, and thus to be estopped from later challenging it or making a counterclaim based upon the actions of the other party. Estoppel by acquiescence is different from estoppel by laches as acquiescence involves an intentional act of the party who is accused of acquiescence, while laches may result from conduct that is not voluntary. In international law, the ICJ distinguishes estoppel from acquiescence by stating that acquiescence is "tacit recognition manifested by unilateral conduct which the other party may interpret as consent,"
- Silence is acquiescence (aka. silent acquiescence and acquiescence by silence). Under this related doctrine, when confronted with a wrong or an act that can be considered a tortious act, one's silence in the face of the transgression may result in a loss of a right to make a claim for loss or damage, on the principle of consent inferred from accepting or permitting the wrongful acts without protest or claim.

== See also ==
- Adverse possession
- Nonacquiescence
- Qui tacet consentire videtur
