= Rhode Island v. Massachusetts =

- Supreme Court of the United States

Decided February 21, 1838
- Full case name: The State of Rhode Island and Providence Plantations, Complainants v. The Commonwealth of Massachusetts, Defendant
- Citations: 37 U.S. 657 (more) 12 Pet. 657; 9 L. Ed. 1233; 1838 U.S. LEXIS 372

Holding
- Supreme Court has original jurisdiction over a suit by one state against another over their shared border

Court membership
- Chief Justice Roger B. Taney Associate Justices Joseph Story · Smith Thompson; John McLean · Henry Baldwin; James M. Wayne · Philip P. Barbour; John Catron · John McKinley

Case opinions
- Majority: Baldwin, joined by Thompson, McLean, Wayne, Catron, McKinley
- Concurrence: Barbour
- Dissent: Taney
- Story took no part in the consideration or decision of the case.

Rhode Island v. Massachusetts, 37 U.S. (12 Pet.) 657 (1838), was a United States Supreme Court case in which the Court asserted its original jurisdiction over a suit in equity, a boundary dispute between Massachusetts and Rhode Island dating to colonial times.

James I had granted the original charter in November 1621. The dispute, which had lasted over 200 years, was over Narragansett Bay. To settle the dispute, Rhode Island moved for a subpoena on 16 March, 1832. Daniel Webster represented Massachusetts.

The Court determined that the compact between the two colonies made in 1711-1718 should govern the boundary line between the states, and therefore confirmed the existing boundary line, rejecting Rhode Island's interpretation of the colonial charters, which would have put the border further into Massachusetts.

This dispute returned to the Supreme Court in 1840 and 1841.
