= Country Club Dispute =

Territorial dispute between Texas and New Mexico

The Country Club Area is a suburb of El Paso, Texas. It was the object of a lengthy border dispute between Texas and New Mexico.

== Origins ==
As part of the Compromise of 1850, Texas gave up its claim to portions of present-day New Mexico, Colorado, Wyoming, Kansas and Oklahoma in exchange for $10,000,000, and New Mexico became a territory. The pertinent boundary of Texas was set in 1850 where the Rio Grande intersects the 32nd parallel. A line from that point along the 32nd parallel to the 103rd meridian defined the southern border of New Mexico.

After the Gadsden Purchase in 1853, Congress passed the Act of 1854 declaring the southern boundary of the Territory of New Mexico. This basically gave all Gadsden Purchase lands to New Mexico (which then included what is now Arizona), thereby creating a 12-mile-long Rio Grande boundary between the State of Texas and New Mexico Territory.

Sometime between 1850 and 1912, when New Mexico gained statehood, the Rio Grande shifted course. How much it shifted, where, and in which direction were the central issues in dispute, as both sides agreed that the Rio Grande, as it existed in 1850, was the true boundary. By 1912, the de facto western boundary of Texas was well beyond the Rio Grande in most places. Deeds for lands over a half-mile west of the Rio Grande were filed in Texas, taxes for these lands were paid in Texas, and the residents voted in Texas.

The stakes of the dispute were more than trivial to these two vast states because of the value of the lands involved. As part of the Chihuahua Desert, lands in proximity to the Rio Grande were substantially more lush and fertile, and hence more valuable than similar sized tracts elsewhere in the region. In addition to productive farms, valuable homes and a country club were built in the vicinity (though not necessarily on the disputed land), hence the name of the dispute (El Paso Country Club is located at 31°50′05″N 106°35′22″W).

== Resolution ==
In 1913, New Mexico filed suit against Texas in the U.S. Supreme Court. The Court appointed a special master to make findings of fact on the disputed issues in the case. The Court heard oral arguments by both states in New Mexico v. Texas in 1927, and announced its verdict later that year. Essentially, the Court sided with Texas with respect to most facts in the case and in its final verdict. They also implied that New Mexico had no standing to dispute any changes to its borders made before it gained statehood in 1912; those boundaries were an issue between Texas and the U.S. Federal Government.

Today, this remains the only major area where Texas extends beyond the Rio Grande.
