= Georgia v. South Carolina (1990) =

- Supreme Court of the United States

Argued January 8, 1990 Decided June 25, 1990
- Full case name: Georgia v. South Carolina
- Citations: 497 U.S. 376 (more) 42 S. Ct. 597; 66 L. Ed. 1069

Court membership
- Chief Justice William Rehnquist Associate Justices William J. Brennan Jr. · Byron White; Thurgood Marshall · Harry Blackmun; John P. Stevens · Sandra Day O'Connor; Antonin Scalia · Anthony Kennedy

Case opinions
- Plurality: Blackmun, joined by O'Connor, Brennan
- Dissent: Stevens, joined by Scalia
- Dissent: White, joined by Marshall
- Dissent: Scalia, joined by Kennedy
- Dissent: Kennedy, joined by Rehnquist

Laws applied
- Treaty of Beaufort

Georgia v. South Carolina, 497 U.S. 376 (1990), is one of a long series of U.S. Supreme Court cases determining the borders of the state of Georgia. In this case, the Court decided the exact border within the Savannah River and whether islands should be a part of Georgia or South Carolina. It also decided the seaward border.

== Background ==
In 1787, the two states agreed in the Treaty of Beaufort that the boundary along the Savannah River was the river's "most northern branch or stream," "reserving all islands in [the river] to Georgia". In a subsequent 1922 Supreme Court decision, also called Georgia v. South Carolina, 257 U.S. 516, also held that all islands in the river belong to Georgia, but that the border should be in the middle of the river between the two shores, with the border halfway between any island and the South Carolina shore.

Since the 1922 case, a number of new islands had been created in the river between the city of Savannah and the ocean, due to the deposit of dredging spoilage or the natural deposit of sediments. In some cases, the new islands were on the South Carolina side of the previously drawn boundary, and Georgia claimed that once a new island emerged, the border should be moved to the midpoint between the new island and the South Carolina shore of the river. In some cases, the state of South Carolina had been collecting property tax from the land owners and policing the land in question for a number of years.

When an island causes the border to leave the middle of the river, it raises the question as to how the border line should return to the middle of the river at each end of the island. South Carolina advocated a right angle bend at each tip of the island, while Georgia advocated a "triequidistant" method which kept the border an equal distance between the two shores and the tip of the island (resulting in a smooth curve.)

The Savannah River north of Elba Island was particularly wide, and the Army Corps of Engineers built a training wall to narrow the channel to prevent it from filling up with silt. The Corps also filled the area behind the training wall with dredging spoilage. Both South Carolina and Georgia claimed the land that was created behind the training wall, even though it was on the South Carolina side of the river. This new land was called "Denwill and Horseshoe Shoal".

Given the valuable natural resources off the Atlantic Ocean shore, the two states also contested where the off-shore boundary between the two states is located. The typical procedure would be to locate the mouth of the Savannah River and then draw a line perpendicular to the shore from the midpoint of the river's mouth. However, the river does not have a clearly defined mouth. Tybee Island forms the southern edge of its mouth, but there is no highlands on the opposite side. South Carolina claimed that a submerged shoal formed the north side of the mouth, while Georgia claimed that Hilton Head Island was the north side of the mouth. The issue is complicated by a bend in the Atlantic coast at this point with Georgia's coast about 20 degrees from true north and South Carolina's coast about 47 degrees from true north. A perpendicular line drawn from each of these angles results in an overlapping 27 degree wedge claimed by both states.

In 1978, the Court appointed Walter E. Hoffman, Senior Judge of the United States District Court for the Eastern District of Virginia, as special master to gather the facts and make a recommendation.

== Opinion of the Court ==
Justice Blackmun delivered a plurality opinion and held that the new island on the South Carolina side of the border belonged to that state rather than Georgia. Georgia had lost the right to that land through prescription and acquiescence. He also found that any new islands emerging after the border was drawn would not cause the border to automatically shift so as to place the island in Georgia. The Court also adopted Georgia's "triequidistant" method for determining the boundary around the existing islands, resulting in the border line curving around those islands.

The Court awarded Denwill and Horseshoe Shoal to Georgia because its creation was "primarily avulsive in nature." The Court also placed the newly emerged Bird Island in Georgia. The Court also set a compromise seaward boundary drawing it perpendicular to a line between Tybee Island and Hilton Head.

Justice White, joined by Justice Marshall, dissented in part. They would draw the boundary at islands at right angles to the tips of the islands back to the middle of the river.

Justice Stevens, joined by Justice Scalia, dissented from the seaward boundary portion of the opinion. This opinion would average the angles of the Georgia and South Carolina coast lines and draw the boundary at an azimuth of this boundary would be approximately 123 1/2 degrees.

Justice Scalia, joined by Justice Kennedy, dissented from the Denwill and Horseshoe Shoal portion of the opinion and would place that land in South Carolina.

Justice Kennedy, joined by Chief Justice Rehnquist, dissented from the portions of the opinion finding that newly formed islands belong in whatever state has that portion of the river. Kennedy reads the Treaty as giving all islands to Georgia, so Kennedy would place them in Georgia unless they were lost by prescription and acquiescence. Accordingly, Kennedy agrees with the majority that the Barnwell Islands belong to South Carolina.

One history text described the case, "In 1990 the United States Supreme Court awarded South Carolina 7,000 acres of water and 3,000 acres of land along the Savannah River, increasing the size of the state by four and a half square miles."
