= New Mexico v. Texas =

State of New Mexico v. State of Texas
- Supreme Court of the United States

Original jurisdiction Argued January 4–5, 1927 Decided December 5, 1927
- Full case name: State of New Mexico v. State of Texas
- Citations: 275 U.S. 279 (more) 48 S. Ct. 126; 72 L. Ed. 280; 1927 U.S. LEXIS 280

Case history
- Prior: Original Jurisdiction
- Subsequent: Modified on denial of rehearing, April 9, 1928

Outcome
- The boundary line between New Mexico and Texas is the middle of the channel of the Rio Grande as it was located in 1850.

Court membership
- Chief Justice William H. Taft Associate Justices Oliver W. Holmes Jr. · Willis Van Devanter; James C. McReynolds · Louis Brandeis; George Sutherland · Pierce Butler; Edward T. Sanford · Harlan F. Stone

Case opinion
- Majority: Sanford, joined by unanimous

New Mexico v. Texas, 275 U.S. 279 (1927), was a United States Supreme Court case that determined the boundary between Texas and New Mexico in the vicinity of El Paso, Texas.

== Background ==
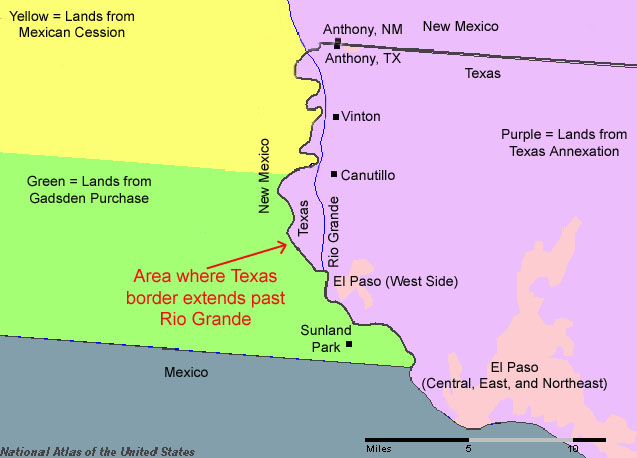
Map showing the disputed area

This suit was brought by the State of New Mexico against the State of Texas in 1913 to settle their common boundary in the valley of the Rio Grande about 15 miles (24 km) from the parallel of 32 degrees north latitude to the parallel of 31 degrees 47 minutes on the international boundary between the United States and Mexico.

Each State asserted that the true boundary line is the middle of the channel of the Rio Grande in 1850. Neither alleged that there had been any change in this line by accretions. And the only issue was as to the true location of the channel in that year. New Mexico believed it was closer to the then-present course of the river. Texas had been issuing deeds for the area known as the Country Club Area, as this was the land in dispute, the case became known by the moniker the Country Club Dispute.

== History of the case ==
This case was filed by the State of New Mexico in the Supreme Court of the United States under the original jurisdiction provisions of Article III, Section 2 of the U.S. Constitution. A master was appointed by the Supreme Court in 1924 to make determinations of fact, and the master made extensive findings. "The master concluded on all the evidence that the allegations in New Mexico's bill as to the location and course of the Rio Grande 'as it existed in the year 1850' were not sustained, and that the river did not then flow on the eastern side of the valley as claimed by New Mexico; that its location and course in 1850 was, in general, as alleged in the cross- bill of Texas."

== Supreme Court holding ==
The unanimous Court held that "the testimony of ancient witnesses called by New Mexico as to their recollection of the old river, is far from satisfactory, and does not, in view of the other evidence, sustain the burden resting on New Mexico".

== See also ==
- Florida v. Georgia
- New Hampshire v. Maine
