= Border disputes between New York and Connecticut =

During the American colonial era, the colonies of New York and Connecticut often disputed the precise location of their shared border, leading to a border dispute that eventually gave the colonies their modern shapes. Though the dispute was officially resolved in 1731, effects of the boundary conflict persisted until well after both colonies gained statehood as part of the United States following the American Revolution.

== Background ==
The dispute originated largely as an extension of a wider ongoing conflict between the colonial ambitions of benefactors of the Dutch Republic and the Kingdom of England. Much of the Dutch jurisprudence was based on the writings of the legal scholar Hugo Grotius, who emphasized claiming the land and interaction with the natives. The English did not generally accept Grotius' theories, in particular his Mare Liberum. When Henry Hudson had first explored the area in 1609, he was employed by the Dutch, so the Netherlands could base its claim on both first discovery and status as financial backer. In addition, the Dutch felt “that territorial possession depended on recognition of the rights of indigenous people in regard to their territory as well as on a Dutch military presence to defend the claim from European incursion.” While the majority of the Dutch population of New Netherland clustered around the Hudson River and western Long Island, the Dutch still maintained forts and trading posts along the Connecticut River (e.g., Fort Hoop, in modern-day Hartford) and went on frequent expeditions to exploit the natural resources of the area (e.g., beaver hunting).

By contrast, the exploding population of the neighboring New England Colonies placed ever more farms and settlements across Connecticut and Long Island Sound. Connecticut Colony also based its claims on conquest. Following the end of the Pequot War in 1638, Connecticut had signed a treaty with the Massachusetts Bay Colony and the Mohegan and Narragansett tribes ceding all of the Pequot lands to Connecticut. The English also rejected the claim that Hudson's discovery secured the area for the Dutch: Hudson was an Englishman and had not been hired to explore the area, but had rather discovered it by accident.

Another English objection to Dutch control was based in dealings with the natives. The English believed the Dutch had endangered the "adjoining Countries most wickedly, feloniously, and traitorously, contrary to the Marine and Admirall Laws of all Christians, [by selling] wholesale guns, powder, shot and ammunition to the Indians, instructing them in the use of our fights and arms." The Dutch claim to the land was further weakened when Peter Stuyvesant justified trading guns by citing pressure from the natives.

== Treaty of 1650 between New Netherland and Connecticut ==
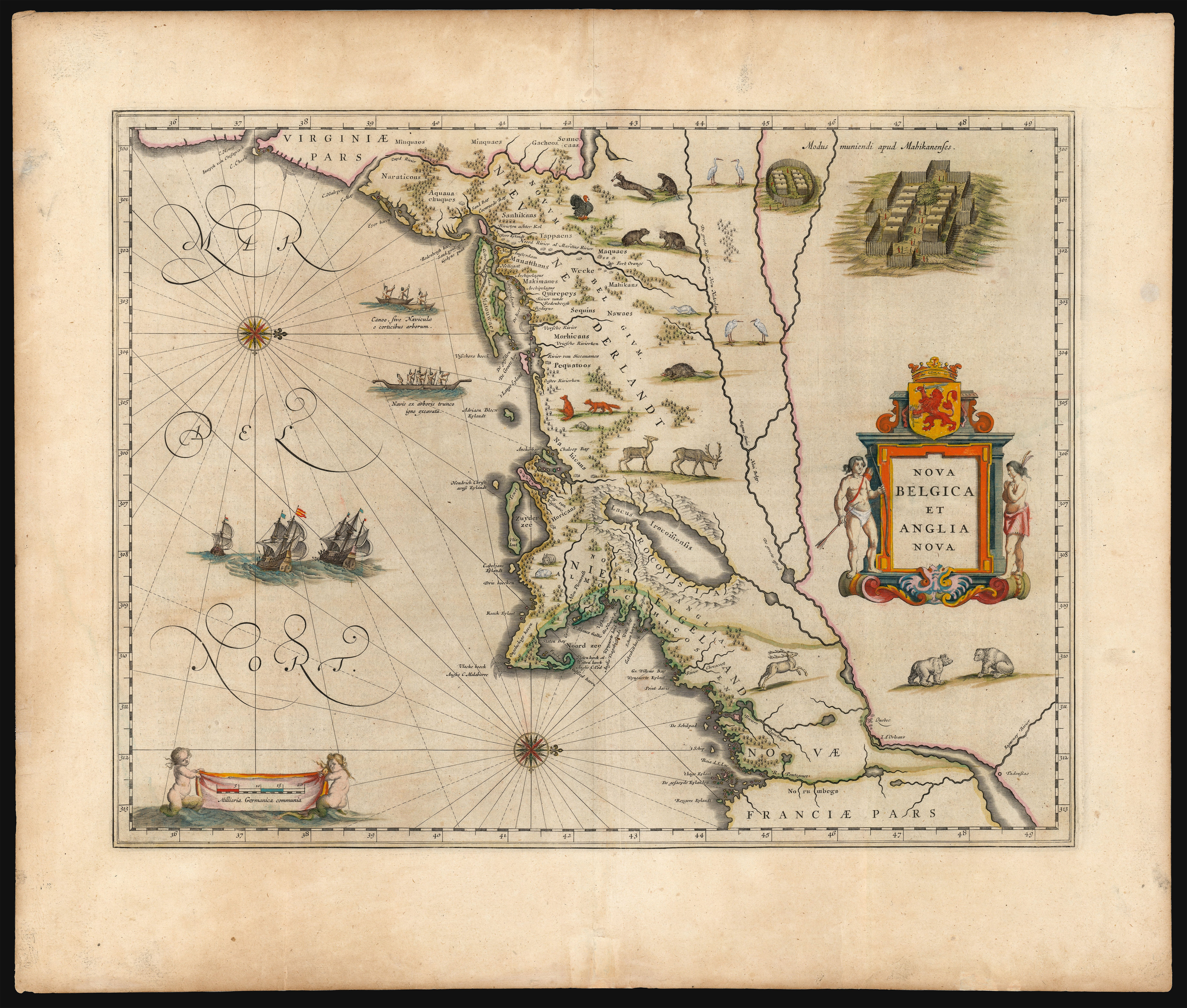
Nova Belgica et Anglia Nova, displaying Dutch claims prior to 1650, 1635

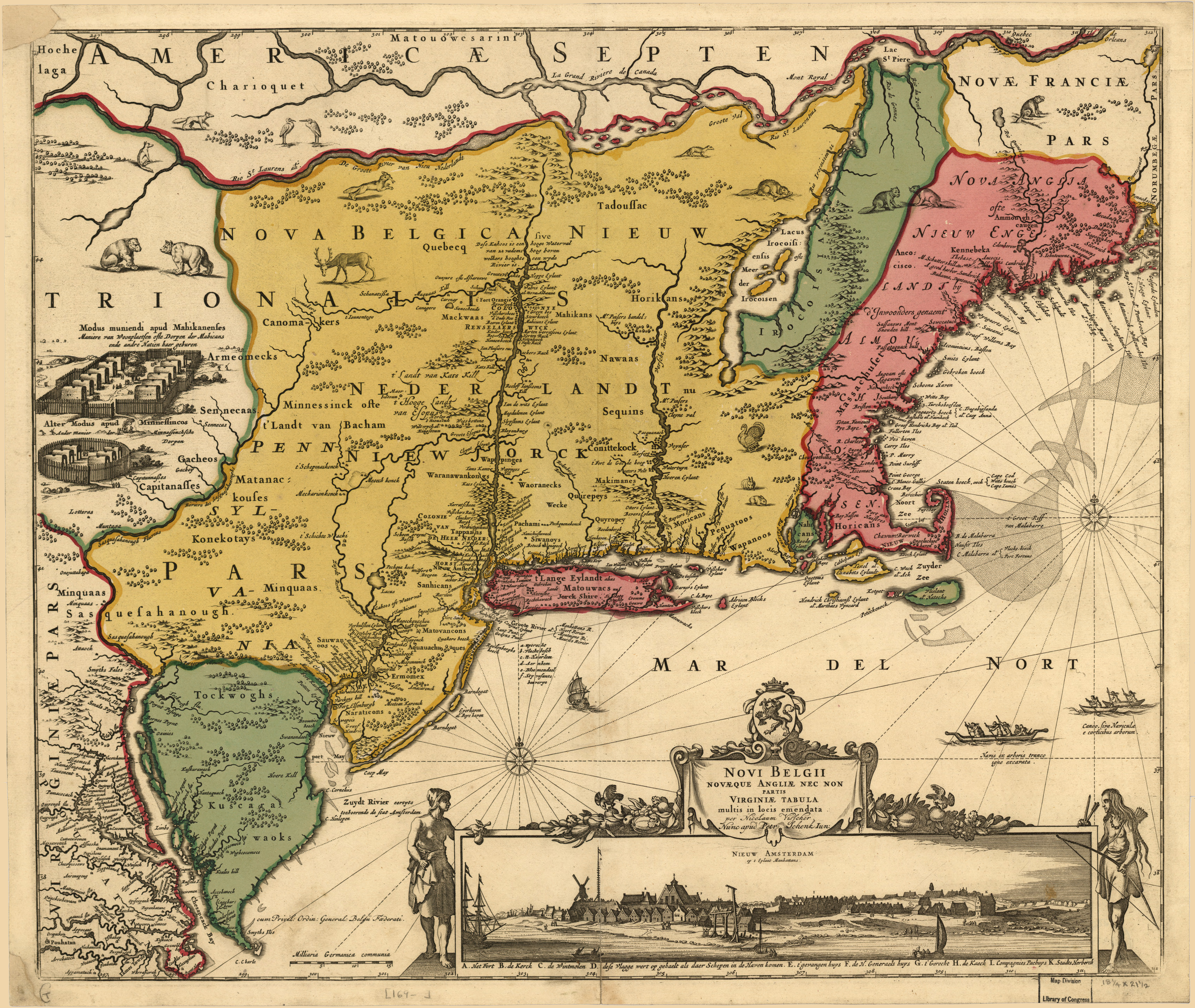
1685 reprint of 1650 map of New Netherland, which is not a completely correct representation of the situation at the time. The border with New England had been adjusted to 50 miles west of the Fresh River, while the Lange Eylandt towns west of Oyster Bay were under Dutch jurisdiction.

In 1650, the Treaty of Hartford sought to set the border between New Netherland and the colony of Connecticut. The main land was split by a line 50 miles from the Connecticut River and Long Island was divided into an East (Connecticut) and West (New Netherland) at Oyster Bay. However, the treaty was never ratified back in England, which left the border unresolved when the Province of New York was created by a sea-to-sea grant in 1664, just two years after Connecticut had been issued a sea-to-sea charter in 1662.

== The colonies of New York and Connecticut ==
=== Governor Nicolls and the 1664 agreement ===
The settlers from Connecticut and New York jostled over their respective claims. Long Islanders who had arrived from New England were very resistant to becoming New Yorkers. Local government under the Duke's charter gave no guarantee of assembly or “other privileges to which [New Englanders] had become accustomed.”

In 1664, Charles II of England sent royal commissioners, led by Richard Nicolls, in part to “end unneighbourly and unbrotherly contentions” about the borders. The commissioners met with John Winthrop and Connecticut commissioners in November 1664.

As part of the agreement, announced in December 1664, the main land was divided “by the consent” of the commissioners with a north-northwest line at the mouth of the Mamaroneck River. Long Island, which was explicitly mentioned only in the grant to the Duke of York, was entirely given to New York. Though nominally an agreement, the “language of the agreement, however, gave it the character of a declaration or order to which Connecticut submitted as a subordinate.”

The new line was west of the 1650 agreement, but it kept Westchester for NY. The line also cut off the Hudson around West Point, making Albany a part of Connecticut. Because few Europeans lived along the Hudson, it's unclear whether the line's intersection with it was known by the commissioners at the time.

In 1665, Commissioner George Cartwright reported, “The Bounds betwixt the Dukes province and Connecticut were mistaken by wrong Information, for it was not intended they should come nearer to Hudsons river then 20 miles, Yett the line was sett doune by the Commissioners to goe from such a Point Nor-nor-west whereas it ought to goes just North, otherwise the line will go into Hudsons river.” In 1675, a New York review of the boundary claimed there was a verbal agreement that the line should be at all times 20 miles from the Hudson; and in 1683, Gov. Dongan heard witnesses testify that the Connecticut commissioners had assured Gov. Nicolls that “the river Mamranet was twenty miles every where from Hudson's River.”

However, the agreement explicitly required royal approval, and since it concerned the grant to the Duke of York it required his approval as well. Neither approval was ever given.

=== Governor Lovelace and the return of New Amsterdam ===
Upon replacing Gov. Nicolls, Gov. Lovelace did not actively press the Duke of York's claims under his grant. The government of New York was less stable than that of Connecticut. It was economically weaker and had to unite a much more heterogeneous population.

For a short period in 1673, New York reverted to New Amsterdam under Dutch control. The Dutch had by this time ratified the 1650 agreement. This would mark a significant loss to Connecticut, which pressed for adherence to the 1664 agreement and the ouster of the Dutch.

=== Governor Andros and New York's 1674 patent ===
Following the Treaty of Westminster, New York was once again under English control. Gov. Andros returned to New York in 1674 with a new patent, again claiming all lands up to the Connecticut River. Gov. Andros showed a markedly aggressive tack in his negotiations with Connecticut. In May 1675, Andros sent a letter asking for land west of the Connecticut River under the Duke's new patent. When Gov. Winthrop objected, Andros sent a representative in June to demand Connecticut's submission, threatening to send soldiers against any rebellion.

During this time of high tensions between the colonies, King Philip's War broke out in 1675. Andros attempted to use this to consolidate lands under the Duke's patent. At the start of the war, Andros sent troops to Fort Saybrook, nominally to defend. However, Winthrop's troops arrived first, and held the fort themselves. Andros requested that Winthrop temporarily relinquish Connecticut's claim to the area in order to strengthen the united defense.

=== Governor Dongan and the 1683 agreement ===
In the 1680s, the Duke of York's influence in England grew stronger, and Gov. Dongan was encouraged to seek a speedy resolution to the border dispute after his arrival in 1683. John Pell, a Westchester justice, granted a warrant requiring the constables of Rye, Greenwich, and Stamford to appear at a NY Court of Assizes in Oct 1683. Gov. Dongan told the court that Connecticut had violated the 1664 agreement and warned “If you do not submitt to let us have all the land within twenty miles of Hudson's River, I must claime as far as the Duke's Pattent goes; which is to the River Connecticut. There is land enough for us all, and I love not to do my neighbors ill offices.” The border agreed upon in 1683 is the modern border; giving Rye to New York but allowing Connecticut to retain Greenwich and Stamford. “The boundary would begin at the northwestern corner of Greenwich, proceed along a line eight miles north of and parallel to the Long Island Sound, then turn due north, extending to Massachusett's southern line.” In respect of the 1664 oral agreement, because Greenwich and Stamford were less than 20 miles from the Hudson the line was more than 20 miles away in the north, granting New York “equivalent lands” in largely unpopulated areas. However, the 1683 agreement was never ratified back in England.

As the Dominion of New England became a reality and quo warranto proceedings were begun against the Connecticut charter in 1686, Gov. Dongan sought to have Connecticut subsumed by New York instead. Despite repeated attempts and conversations with Connecticut leaders, Dongan was informed by the General Court of England that it would be impossible and Connecticut would become part of the Dominion.

=== Governor Fletcher, Governor Bellomont, and the 1700 Order in Council ===
Following the 1688 Revolution, New York representatives in England continued to press for the annexation of Connecticut and the surrounding New England colonies, emphasizing New York's status as a royal rather than proprietary colony. Locally, private parties continued to dispute claims. In 1692, landowners in Rye and Bedford (New York, per the 1683 agreement) went to Connecticut General Court to seek protection. A month later, in November, some of these men were made to appear in New York courts and “acknowledge their fault in making their addresses to the Colony of Connecticut to be taken into that pretended Government.”

In 1693, Gov. Fletcher commanded a Connecticut militia in Hartford as part of an intercolonial defense force called for in the royal commission. Fletcher, by his own admission, was bumptious and bellicose; Fitz-John Winthrop was later able to use this event to remove Fletcher from office in 1697. Before being replaced by Gov. Bellomont, Fletcher referred the dispute to Whitehall.

Gov. Bellomont and Gov. Winthrop pressed their respective cases. Winthrop argued that the 1683 agreement was invalid because it had never been ratified in England. But the March 1700 Order in Council sided with New York and the 1683 agreement; the dispute had finally been settled by order of the king.

== Settling of the boundary ==
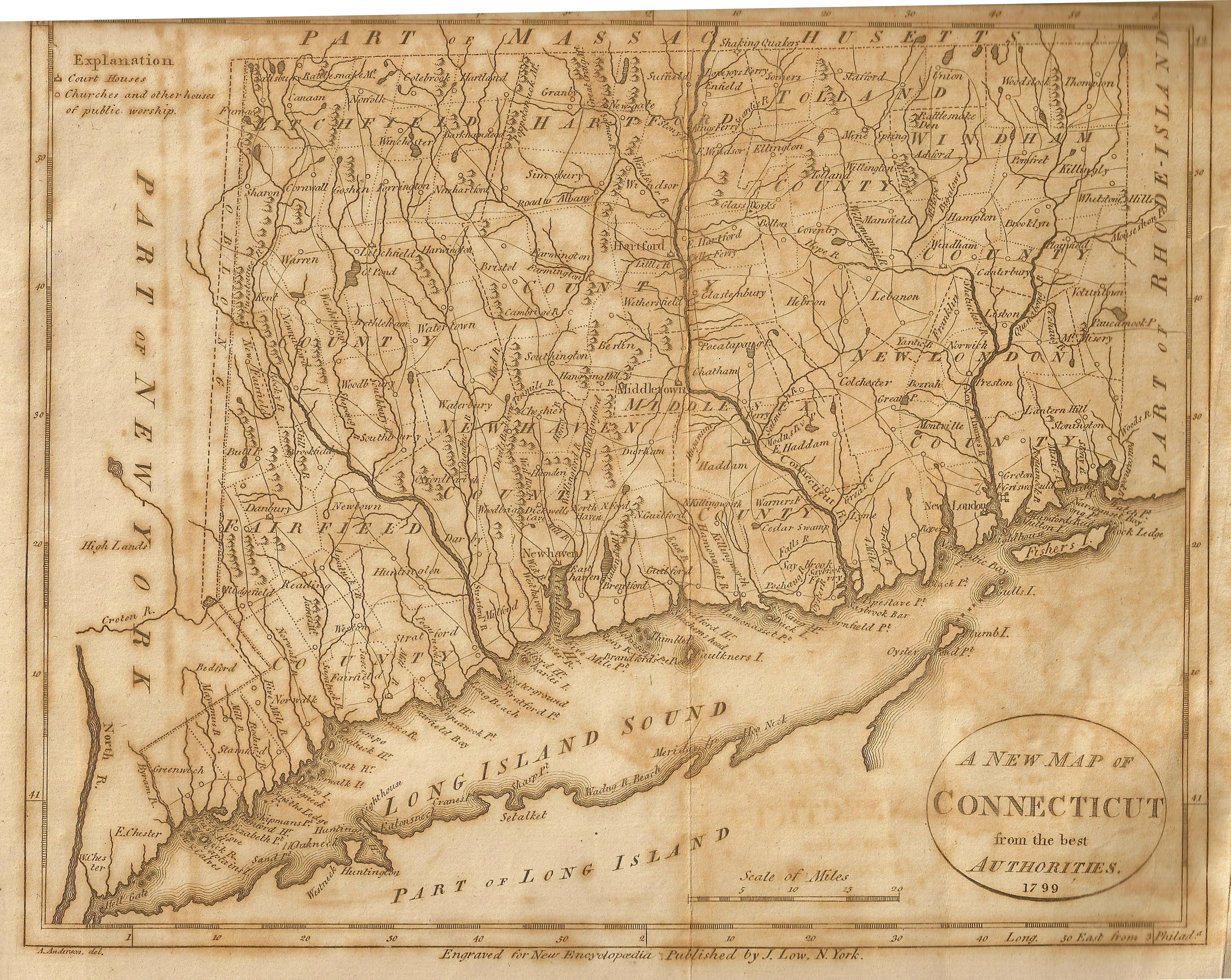
A 1799 map of Connecticut which shows the Oblong. From Low's Encyclopaedia.

The governments of New York and Connecticut were not quick to effectuate the 1700 Order in Council. Between 1700 and 1717, neither attempted to actually survey and settle the border, leaving the issue to individual landowners. During this time, New York issued patents extending well beyond the boundary, and some New York patent holders even controlled land as far as the Housatonic River.

Beginning in 1717, Connecticut began to attempt to survey the line; New York had more trouble securing the appropriate funds because New York's royal patent made new land less profitable to individual citizens. In 1725, in order to effectuate the Order in Council, New York and Connecticut reached a working boundary agreement. The agreement created the Wilton and Ridgefield Angles to better follow the Hudson and to keep as much of Ridgefield in Connecticut as possible, as well as settled on the "equivalent land" that New York would receive in exchange for the Connecticut panhandle (i.e., the Oblong). The final survey was made and the Oblong was formally signed over by Connecticut in May 1731, ending the territorial dispute between Connecticut and New York.

Disputes by and between individual landowners, however, continued. For example, the Philipse family owned all of what is now Putnam County, New York, but did not enforce their ownership of the land within the Oblong, allowing hundreds of squatters to move in, mostly from Connecticut. These settlers were allowed to stay for decades, and a small village even sprung up on the Philipse land (now the hamlet of Patterson, New York). The issue was not resolved until the Philipse's land was confiscated after the Revolution, and the settlers were finally given deeds.

== See also ==
- History of Connecticut
- Equivalent Lands
- History of New York
- Charter of Connecticut Colony
