= Vermont v. New York =

- Supreme Court of the United States

Argued February 29, 1972 Decided April 24, 1972
- Full case name: Vermont v. New York, et al.
- Citations: 406 U.S. 186 (more) 92 S. Ct. 1603; 31 L. Ed. 2d 785; 1972 U.S. LEXIS 66

Case history
- Subsequent: 417 U.S. 270 (1974)

Holding
- The State of Vermont is given permission to file an original complaint against the State of New York and International Paper Corporation.

Court membership
- Chief Justice Warren E. Burger Associate Justices William O. Douglas · William J. Brennan Jr. Potter Stewart · Byron White; Thurgood Marshall · Harry Blackmun; Lewis F. Powell Jr. · William Rehnquist

Case opinion
- Per curiam

Vermont v. New York, 406 U.S. 186 (1972), was a decision by the U.S. Supreme Court giving the State of Vermont permission to file an original complaint against the State of New York and International Paper Corporation.

When two states have a controversy between each other, the case is filed for original jurisdiction with the United States Supreme Court. This is one of the very limited circumstances where the court acts as original jurisdiction, e.g. a trial court. In all other cases the court acts as the highest level appellate court in the United States.

== See also ==
- List of United States Supreme Court cases, volume 406
