= Original jurisdiction of the Supreme Court of the United States =

When cases are heard without going through lower courts

The Supreme Court of the United States has original jurisdiction in a small class of cases described in Article III, section 2, of the United States Constitution and further delineated by statute.

== Authority ==
The relevant constitutional clause states:

In all Cases affecting Ambassadors, other public Ministers and Consuls, and those in which a State shall be Party, the supreme Court shall have original Jurisdiction. In all the other Cases before mentioned, the supreme Court shall have appellate Jurisdiction, both as to Law and Fact, with such Exceptions, and under such Regulations as the Congress shall make.

Certain cases that have not been considered by a lower court may be heard by the Supreme Court in the first instance under what is termed original jurisdiction. The Supreme Court's authority in this respect is derived from Article III of the Constitution, which states that the Supreme Court shall have original jurisdiction "in all cases affecting ambassadors, other public ministers and consuls, and those in which a state shall be party." The original jurisdiction of the court is set forth in 28 U.S.C. § 1251. This statute provides that lower federal courts may also hear cases where the Supreme Court has original jurisdiction, with the exception of disputes between two or more states. When a case is between two or more states, the Supreme Court holds both original and exclusive jurisdiction, and no lower court may hear such cases.

In one of its earliest cases, Chisholm v. Georgia, the Court found this jurisdiction to be self-executing, so that no further congressional action was required to permit the Court to exercise it.

The constitutional grant of original jurisdiction to the Supreme Court cannot be expanded by statute. In the case of Marbury v. Madison, the newly-elected president, Thomas Jefferson, ordered his acting Secretary of State not to deliver commissions for appointments that had been made by his predecessor, John Adams. One of these appointees, William Marbury, filed a petition for a writ of mandamus directly in the Supreme Court, on the jurisdictional grounds that the Judiciary Act of 1789 stated that the Supreme Court "shall have power to issue writs of prohibition to the district courts [...] and writs of mandamus [...] to any courts appointed, or persons holding office, under the authority of the United States". The court, in its first exercise of judicial review over a statute enacted by Congress, held that this grant of power to the Supreme Court was beyond what the Constitution permitted, and that this language was therefore invalid as unconstitutional.

== Cases ==
The number of cases heard pursuant to the court's original jurisdiction "has always been a minute portion of its overall caseload", generally including only one or two such cases per term.

Between 1789 and 1959, the Court issued written opinions in only 123 original cases. Since 1960, the Court has received fewer than 140 motions for leave to file original cases, nearly half of which were denied a hearing.

Most of these cases involve disputes over state boundaries and water rights, but others center on tax or interstate pollution issues. The court has tended to decline other kinds of cases arising from disputes between the states.

Examples of such cases include the 1892 case of United States v. Texas, a case to determine whether a parcel of land belonged to the United States or to Texas, and Virginia v. Tennessee (1893), a case turning on whether an incorrectly drawn boundary between two states can be changed by a state court, and whether the setting of the correct boundary requires Congressional approval. Two other original jurisdiction cases involve colonial-era borders and rights under navigable waters in New Jersey v. Delaware (2008), and water rights between riparian states upstream of navigable waters in Kansas v. Colorado.

On one occasion, United States v. Shipp (1906), a criminal contempt complaint was filed directly to the Court, following the lynching of a defendant whose appeal to the Court had been granted. The case brought against those responsible for the lynching gave the Court original jurisdiction over a criminal case for the first and thus far only time in its history.

In Texas v. Pennsylvania (2020), the State of Texas filed an action with the Supreme Court alleging that four states had violated the United States Constitution by changing election procedures through non-legislative means. The Court summarily dismissed the case, unanimously holding that Texas lacked standing to challenge the results of the election held by another state.

== Procedure ==
Because the nine-member Supreme Court is not well-suited to conducting pretrial proceedings or trials, original jurisdiction cases accepted by the court are typically referred to a well-qualified lawyer or lower-court judge to serve as special master, conduct the proceedings, and report recommendations to the Court. The Court then considers whether to accept the special master's report or whether to sustain any exceptions filed to the report.

Although it has not happened since 1794 in the case of Georgia v. Brailsford, parties in an action at law in which the Supreme Court has original jurisdiction may request that a jury determine issues of fact.

In 1950, in the case United States v. Louisiana, the state of Louisiana moved for a jury trial, but the Court denied the motion, ruling that the suit was an equity action and not an action at law, and that therefore the Seventh Amendment guarantee of a jury trial did not apply. If a matter involving an action at law did come before the Court, however, a jury might be empaneled. The Court noted in a footnote in the decision that under 28 U.S.C. § 1872: "In all original actions at law in the Supreme Court against citizens of the United States, issues of fact shall be tried by a jury." However, it did not decide whether the statute and the Seventh Amendment required such a jury.

== See also ==
- List of boundary cases of the United States Supreme Court
