= 2016 Massachusetts Question 3 =

Referendum concerning cruelty to farm animals

- November 8, 2016
- Conditions for Farm Animals

Results
Choice	Votes	%
Yes	2,530,143	77.64%
No	728,654	22.36%
Valid votes	3,258,797	96.45%
Invalid or blank votes	120,004	3.55%
Total votes	3,378,801	100.00%

Yes
90–100%
80–90%
70–80%
60–70%
50–60%
No
80–90%
60–70%
50–60%

An Act to Prevent Cruelty to Farm Animals, more commonly known as Question 3, was the third initiative on the 2016 Massachusetts ballot. The measure requires Massachusetts farmers to give chickens, pigs, and calves enough room to turn around, stand up, lie down, and fully extend their limbs. It also prohibits the sale of eggs or meat from animals raised in conditions that did not meet these standards.

In 2016, eleven other states had enacted laws against some of these forms of confinement, and California had a law prohibiting the sale of any eggs from chickens kept in small cages. The measure was supported by the Humane Society of the United States and its allies, and opposed by regional and national animal agriculture groups. Proponents argued that the initiative represented a modest animal welfare reform that would benefit food safety, while opponents rejected both claims and warned that the regulations would sharply increase the price of animal products, harming low-income Massachusetts residents.

The measure was overwhelmingly approved by voters, with 77.6% of votes in favor, becoming the broadest statute against farm animal confinement in the country. It took full effect on January 1, 2022.

Question 3 has been the subject of two legal challenges. The first, attempting to block it from the ballot for procedural reasons, was ruled against by the Massachusetts Supreme Judicial Court in July 2016. The second was filed with the U.S. Supreme Court by a coalition of agricultural states, claiming Question 3's provisions violated the dormant Commerce Clause; the Court declined to hear the case in January 2019.

== Background ==
=== Intensive animal confinement in the U.S. ===
Confinement practices banned by Question 3

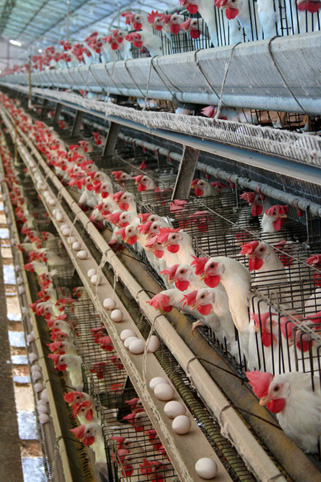
Egg-laying hens in battery cages

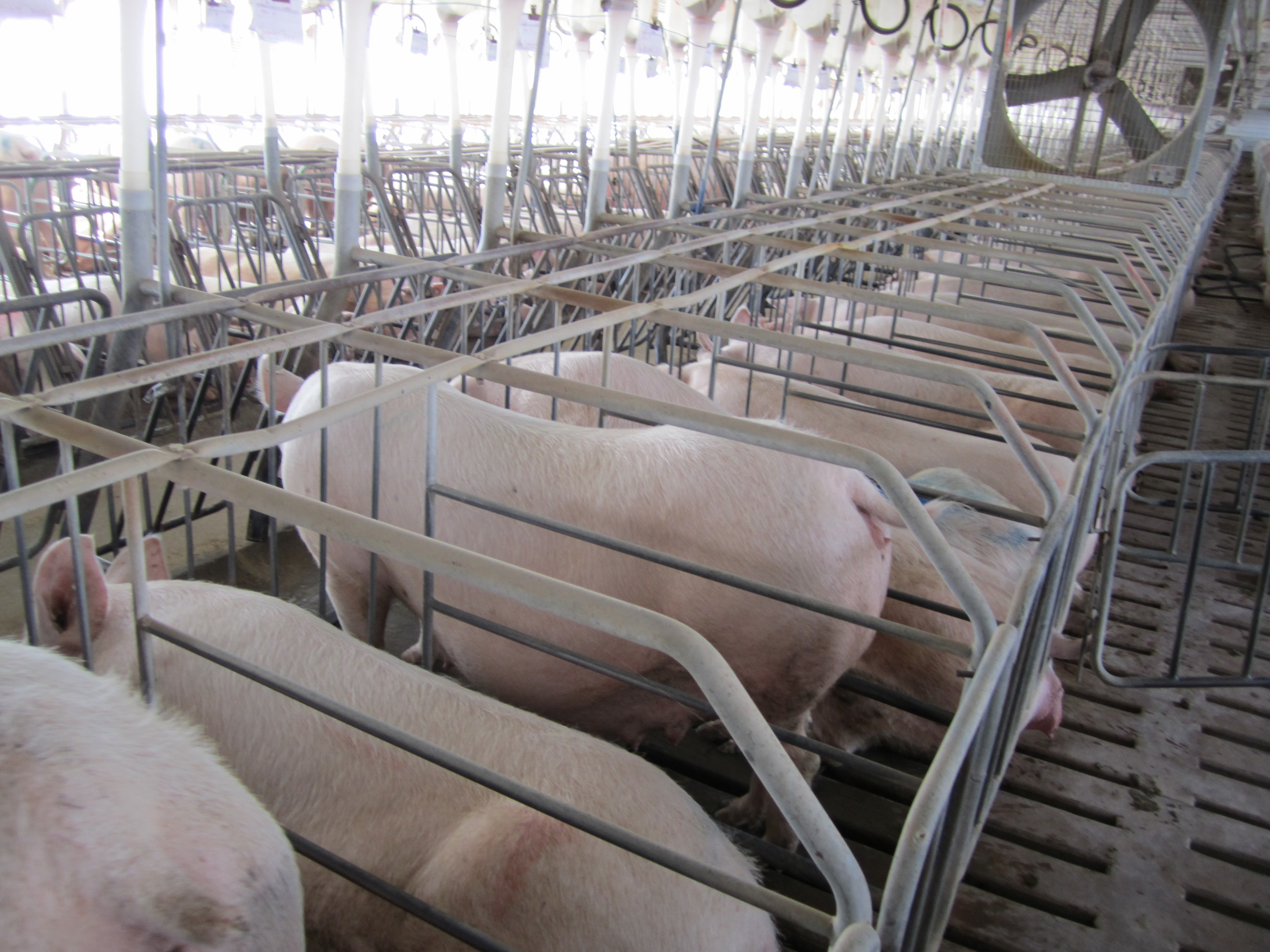
Gestation crates for pregnant sows

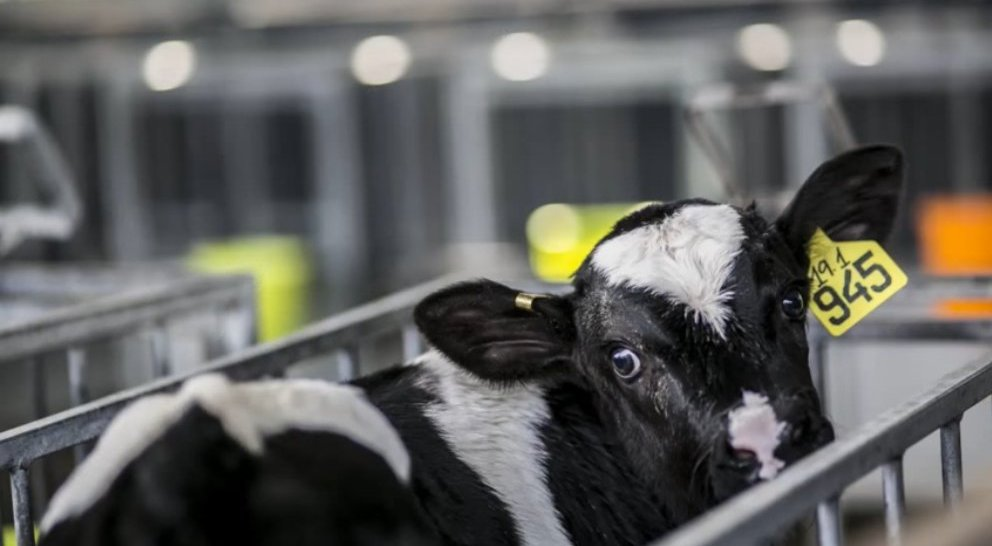
A calf in a narrow cage

Modern animal agriculture in the United States is dominated by indoor-housing systems in which animals are kept at very high densities, in order to maximize economic profit. These systems decrease land use requirements and increase feeding efficiency, but they restrict animals' movement, prevent animals from engaging in natural behaviors, and can lead to production-related diseases.

Three such systems have been the focus of most regulatory debate: battery cages for egg-laying hens, gestation crates for pregnant sows, and veal crates for male dairy calves. Battery cages are stacks of wire crates that contain one to eight or more hens, with each hen typically being allotted less space than a sheet of printer paper; according to U.S. Department of Agriculture estimates, this practice accounted for over 90% of commercial U.S. egg production in 2016. Gestation stalls are not much larger than the sows they confine, and were used by more than 80 percent of U.S. pork producers. In the dairy industry, both male and female calves are taken from cows within a few days of birth to maximize milk yields, and kept in crates that limit their movement and ability to interact with other calves.

In the decade before Massachusetts Question 3, a number of large American food chains, retailers, and animal agriculture corporations had voluntarily committed to plans phasing out the use of battery cages in egg production and gestation crates in pork production.

=== Previous farm animal protection regulations ===
No federal legislation protects the welfare of U.S. farm animals except during transportation and slaughter, and poultry are excluded from the latter regulations. This lack of regulation has sometimes been attributed to the influence of agricultural interest groups at the federal level.

Between 2011 and 2013, the animal protection group Humane Society of the United States (HSUS) and the industry group United Egg Producers (UEP) jointly lobbied for compromise legislation that would have phased out the use of battery cages, implemented minimum space requirements for cage-free systems, and prohibited the sale of eggs produced in conditions that violated these standards. A bill with these provisions was introduced by Oregon Representative Kurt Schrader in 2012 as H.R. 3789 and received a hearing. However, the National Cattlemen's Beef Association and National Pork Producers Council lobbied against the bill, believing it could set a precedent for regulation of other animal industries, and it was not brought to a vote. After this failure, HSUS and UEP did not renew their agreement, and HSUS returned its focus to state-level regulations.

==== State-level regulations ====
Eleven other U.S. states had imposed or planned restrictions on one or more of these intensive animal confinement practices, beginning with Florida in 2002. Five of these policies were implemented by legislative action, one by executive action, and five by public referendum. These policy changes were largely driven by the activities of HSUS along with other animal-welfare groups, who used a strategy of initially targeting coastal, relatively liberal states with little animal agriculture activity. This strategy, and the use of broad-based, non-partisan messaging, allowed consistent success for HSUS; at the time of the 2016 election, voters had passed every state ballot measure banning similar "cruel" confinement. However, most of the states with the most intensive animal farms continued to allow these practices, have no mechanism for public ballot initiatives, and were perceived by animal welfare activists as having legislatures friendly to agricultural interests. As a result, this activity was unlikely to be affected except by other states' restrictions on the sale of such products.

In 2008, California voters passed ballot Proposition 2 with a 63.5% majority. This initiative prohibited confining hens, pigs, and calves so that they could not turn around, lie down, stand up, or fully extend their limbs. Although Proposition 2 did not restrict the sale of animal products produced using these practices, it was amended by an accessory bill passed by the California Assembly in 2010 that banned the sale of eggs from intensively confined hens. Supporters of this law argued that it was necessary to "level the playing field" and prevent California egg producers from being placed at a competitive disadvantage with out-of-state producers. When both laws went into effect in 2015, they were the first comprehensive restrictions on farm animal confinement conditions, both during production and when selling animal products, including those imported from outside the state. Later laws in several states, including California Proposition 12 in 2018, applied similar requirements to other animal products.

After California's laws went into effect, the number of hens kept and eggs produced in the state both decreased while the price of eggs rose; however, these effects were partly attributable to a widespread outbreak of bird flu at approximately the same time. As a result of this, and the historical variability of egg prices, there was considerable uncertainty about the effects of California's laws on egg prices at the time of the 2016 election.

The attorneys general of six agricultural states filed a lawsuit challenging California's ban on the sale of eggs produced under intensive confinement in other states, on the grounds that it violated the federal government's Constitutional authority to regulate interstate commerce and preempt state laws. This case, Missouri v. Harris, was pending before the Ninth Circuit appeals court during the 2016 election.

==== Previous efforts in Massachusetts ====
Prior to Question 3, there were no laws governing the confinement of farmed animals in Massachusetts.

In 1988, a ballot question in Massachusetts would have required the Department of Food and Agriculture to regulate surgical procedures such as castration and de-beaking, methods of transportation, slaughter, diet and housing for farm animals. If passed, it would have been the first state law requiring that farm animals be treated humanely. The measure was defeated by a vote of 66% to 27%,

In each session of the Massachusetts legislature between 2009 and 2015, bills were introduced that would have prevented chickens, calves, and pregnant sows from being confined so that they could not turn around or extend their limbs. These bills were not brought to a vote. In 2013 and 2015, State Representative Stephen Kulik introduced bills to create a state commission that would issue standards for livestock treatment; this proposal earned the support of the Massachusetts Farm Bureau.

== Path to the ballot ==
Supporters of the initiative, led by the HSUS, formed a committee to support it on August 28, 2015. The text of the proposed question was submitted to the office of Massachusetts Attorney General Maura Healey for certification that it complied with the state's constitutional requirements, and received approval on September 2, 2015.

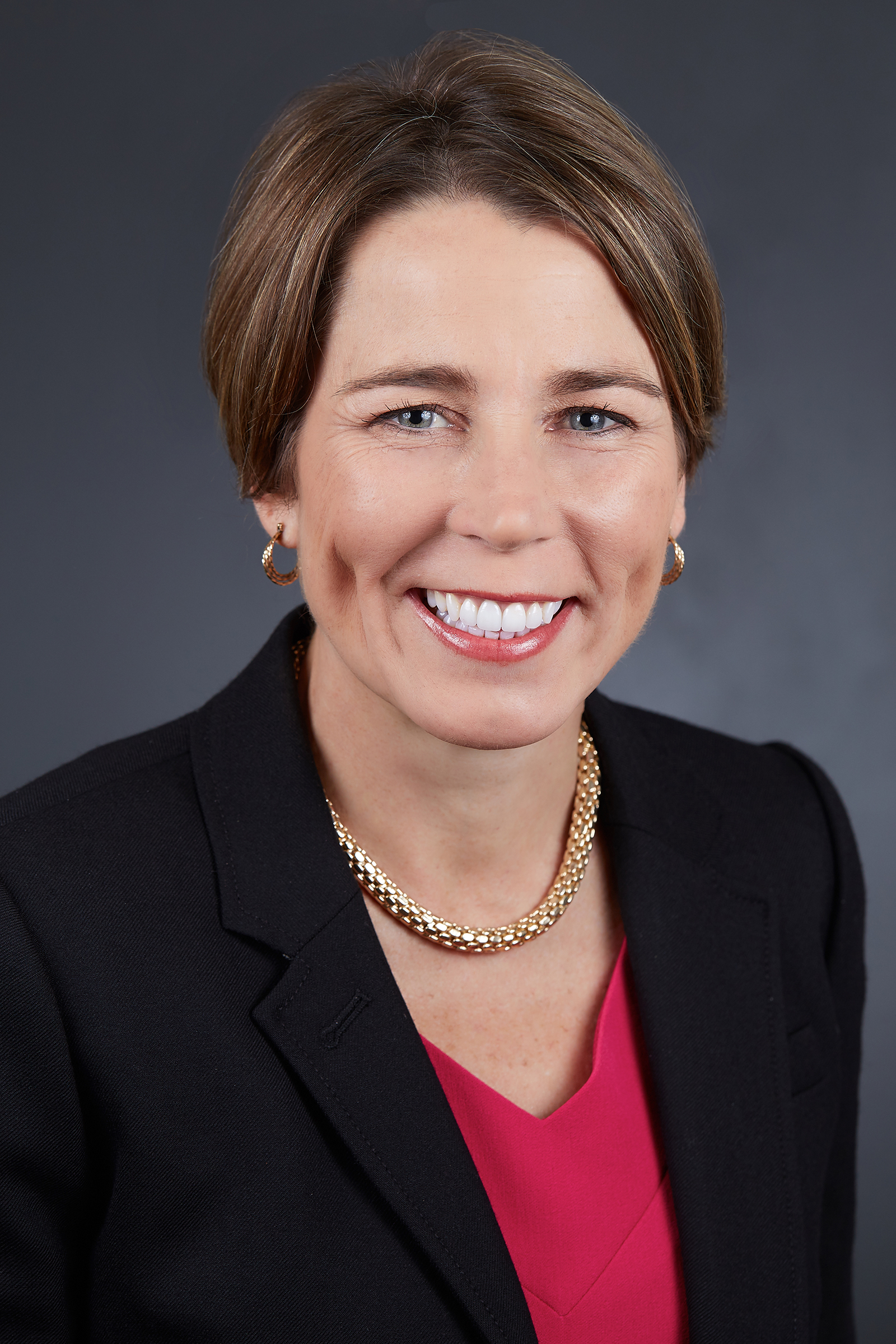
Massachusetts Attorney General Maura Healey. Her certification of Question 3 was upheld by the state Supreme Court; she later personally endorsed the measure, and submitted a defense of its constitutionality to the Supreme Court.

Supporters then had to gather 64,750 registered Massachusetts voters' signatures in order to present the proposal to the state legislature. They collected over 130,000 signatures, saying in a press release that they did so without paid assistance; the office of Secretary of State William F. Galvin certified 95,817 of them, more than for any other initiative that year, and sent the bill to the Massachusetts General Court as H. 3930 on December 18, 2015. The legislature held a hearing in February 2016, at which free-range farmers, veterinarians, and animal protection advocates spoke in favor of the initiative, while representatives of egg and pork producers testified against. The Democratic and Republican co-chairs of the hearing, the latter of whom owned a beef farm, said afterwards that they were concerned about potential Commerce Clause issues, and would favor Rep. Kulik's bill establishing a state commission governing the treatment of farm animals instead.

The legislature's failure to adopt the initiative by May 3, which was expected given its history with similar bills, initiated the next stage of the process, in which proponents had to collect the signatures of 10,792 additional voters by June 22. They gathered 40,000, again more than for any other question, and in July the initiative was certified by Secretary Galvin as the third of four 2016 Massachusetts ballot measures.

=== Massachusetts Supreme Judicial Court challenge ===
Opponents of the initiative filed a lawsuit on April 25, 2016, claiming that Attorney General Healey had erred in certifying the initiative and requesting that the Massachusetts Supreme Judicial Court bar it from the ballot under the Single Subject clause. This provision of the Massachusetts Constitution requires that ballot initiatives only contain subjects "which are related or which are mutually dependent". It is intended to prevent controversial proposals from being unfairly bundled together with more popular ones to increase their chance of passing; for example, in 2006 the Court struck down a proposed initiative that combined a ban on dog racing with an increase in penalties for abusing dogs.

The plaintiffs in the lawsuit were Diane Sullivan, an anti-poverty activist, and James Dunn, a farmer; they were funded by Protect the Harvest, a national nonprofit that opposes restrictions on animal use. The plaintiffs argued that the initiative's bans on the production and the sale of intensively confined animal products represented unrelated questions, and that the bans on confinement of chickens, pigs, and calves were similarly separate issues on which voters might have divergent opinions. They also argued that the law inappropriately contained an "argumentative" statement of its purpose. The sincerity of Protect the Harvest's commitment to anti-poverty work was questioned by HSUS president Paul Shapiro, who pointed to "offensive" comments about welfare recipients made by its attorney, Jon Bruning, in 2010.

On July 6, the court unanimously ruled against the plaintiffs. The court wrote that all the provisions of the initiative were "complementary" and shared the unifying purpose of "preventing farm animals from being caged in overly cramped conditions", and that the text was of an appropriate form for a law. They also questioned why the plaintiffs had delayed their filing so long after Healey's office issued its decision in September, and recommended that future litigants appeal ballot initiatives by February of an election year.

== Text ==
External document

Official 2016 Massachusetts Voter Information Packet
Contains the full text and summary of the initiative, with brief arguments in favor and against.

The initiative's language was very similar to that of California's Proposition 2. It built on this law's framework by adding more details about each species' required space allotment, including in cage-free systems, and by including an explicit enforcement mechanism: private citizens would be able to file complaints with the attorney general's office, which would be able to issue fines to violators. It also went further than California's laws in prohibiting the sale of intensively confined pork and veal products in addition to eggs, making it the broadest anti-confinement regulation in the country at the time of the campaign.

The text of the ballot question was as follows:

Do you approve of a law summarized below, on which no vote was taken by the Senate or the House of Representatives on or before May 3, 2016?

The ballot question was accompanied by the following explanatory text:

This proposed law would prohibit any farm owner or operator from knowingly confining any breeding pig, calf raised for veal, or egg-laying hen in a way that prevents the animal from lying down, standing up, fully extending its limbs, or turning around freely. The proposed law would also prohibit any business owner or operator in Massachusetts from selling whole eggs intended for human consumption or any uncooked cut of veal or pork if the business owner or operator knows or should know that the hen, breeding pig, or veal calf that produced these products was confined in a manner prohibited by the proposed law. The proposed law would exempt sales of food products that combine veal or pork with other products, including soups, sandwiches, pizzas, hotdogs, or similar processed or prepared food items.

The proposed law's confinement prohibitions would not apply during transportation; state and county fair exhibitions; 4-H programs; slaughter in compliance with applicable laws and regulations; medical research; veterinary exams, testing, treatment and operation if performed under the direct supervision of a licensed veterinarian; five days prior to a pregnant pig's expected date of giving birth; any day that pig is nursing piglets; and for temporary periods for animal husbandry purposes not to exceed six hours in any twenty-four hour period.

The proposed law would create a civil penalty of up to $1,000 for each violation and would give the Attorney General the exclusive authority to enforce the law, and to issue regulations to implement it. As a defense to enforcement proceedings, the proposed law would allow a business owner or operator to rely in good faith upon a written certification or guarantee of compliance by a supplier.

The proposed law would be in addition to any other animal welfare laws and would not prohibit stricter local laws.

The proposed law would take effect on January 1, 2022. The proposed law states that if any of its parts were declared invalid, the other parts would stay in effect.

A YES VOTE would prohibit any confinement of pigs, calves, and hens that prevents them from lying down, standing up, fully extending their limbs, or turning around freely.

A NO VOTE would make no change in current laws relative to the keeping of farm animals.

The full text of the law was later entered in the Massachusetts Session laws of 2016 as Chapter 333, "An Act to Prevent Cruelty to Farm Animals".

== Campaign ==
=== Supporters and opponents ===
Question 3 was supported throughout the campaign by a dedicated ballot question committee, Citizens for Farm Animal Protection, which was incorporated in August 2015. Its campaign was directed by Matthew Dominguez, Director of Public Policy for the Humane Society of the United States, and Stephanie Harris, the Massachusetts director of the Humane Society, and headquartered at an office provided by the animal charity and hospital MSPCA-Angell. Question 3 was endorsed by stakeholders who had already committed to not using intensive confinement, including over one hundred Massachusetts farmers and certain large food retailers; by public interest groups, including animal and environmental protection groups, labor organizations, and religious groups; and by Massachusetts Governor Charlie Baker, U.S. senator Ed Markey, five U.S. House members, 35 of 200 state legislators, and Attorney General Healey.

The committee opposing the initiative, Citizens Against Food Tax Injustice, did not formally incorporate until the end of September, 2016. It represented a coalition of trade organizations for egg and pork producers and food retailers, Protect the Harvest, and anti-poverty advocates. The committee hired Diane Sullivan, one of the plaintiffs in the Supreme Judicial Court case, as its director. Sullivan, a lawyer, had previously experienced homelessness with her children, and had been working with an organization to end family homelessness for several years before joining the campaign. Although she coordinated with Protect the Harvest and the Massachusetts Farm Bureau, Sullivan primarily campaigned alone, emphasizing her experiences of relying on intensively caged eggs as a cheap source of protein for her family during periods of food insecurity.

The Massachusetts Veterinary Medical Association opposed the measure, saying that while it did not disapprove of eliminating the confinement practices in question, a state commission was needed to implement more comprehensive and flexible standards. People for the Ethical Treatment of Animals opposed a similar measure two years later in California on the abolitionist grounds that there should be no commercial egg-laying hens, whether in cages or not; however, they did not play a significant role in the 2016 Question 3 campaign.

==== Campaign finance ====
Citizens for Farm Animal Protection spent a total of $2.8 million. This was provided primarily from HSUS (approximately $1.8 million, in addition to in-kind donations of staff time), but also included large donations from animal-welfare organizations including the American Society for the Prevention of Cruelty to Animals; many donations from private individuals, including $250,000 from finance executive Maximilian Stone; and $100,000 from Dr. Bronner's Magic Soaps.

Citizens Against Food Tax Injustice was funded primarily by a $195,000 contribution from Forrest Lucas, president of Lucas Oil and founder of Protect the Harvest, and $100,000 from the National Pork Producers Council. The committee had a total budget of $302,900.

Both sides began airing television advertisements at the end of October, 2016.

=== Issues ===
The state of Massachusetts only contained one farm whose practices fell under the scope of the initiative. As a result, the campaign focused largely on the price, quality, and ethical status of animal products imported from outside the state.

Although both sides agreed the initiative would increase the price of covered animal products, a primary focus of public debate was how much it would do so. Opponents warned that eggs and meat would become "luxury items," and cited analyses of California's laws indicating they raised the price of a dozen eggs by approximately $.49, or $.75 or more, in the year they went into effect. They argued that such an increase would represent a serious hardship for Massachusetts residents struggling with poverty, and that this group's voice had been excluded from food policy debates. Proponents cited an egg industry study finding that switching to cage-free systems would only increase costs by one to two cents per egg; they also argued that the relative cost of cage-free eggs would decrease when retailers could no longer charge a premium for them, and that Massachusetts "shouldn’t have a two-tiered system where safer food is only accessible to some."

External images

Gallery of photographs of chicken cages at Diemand Farm, a point of controversy during the campaign.

Proponents of Question 3 focused on the animal welfare impacts of the initiative, framing the requirement for animals to be able to turn around and extend their limbs as a modest and minimal reform. However, opponents charged that the measure could have negative effects on animals and farm workers. The operators of the only caged egg farm in the state, Diemand Farm of Wendell, described how their previous cage-free system had resulted in cannibalism, crowding, hygiene problems, and uneven access to food and water, concerns echoed by statewide allies. They also argued that chickens did not need to be able to spread both wings, as they could extend them one at a time to stretch while caged. Even some farmers who used cage-free systems for welfare reasons expressed concern that the question would be decided by voters who did not have experience with agriculture, or appreciation for the complexity of the issue.

Supporters of Question 3, including some veterinarians, argued that the initiative would have public health benefits, claiming that the stress and high density of intensive confinement systems increases the risk of animal products being contaminated with salmonella and other diseases. Opponents rejected these arguments, claiming that cage-free systems caused more salmonella.

Finally, opponents questioned the necessity of the measure. The Massachusetts Farm Bureau, primarily concerned about consumers losing trust in Massachusetts farms, emphasized that intensive confinement practices were rare in Massachusetts and unlikely to become more common; its president argued that the initiative targeted out-of-state producers, violating the Commerce Clause. Others maintained that the free market was already shifting away from the confinement practices in question, making the initiative unnecessary. The National Pork Producers Council alleged that the move was part of a "vegan agenda"; HSUS denied this, claiming their interest was in ensuring humane conditions on farms. The CEO of United Egg Producers said that a “patchwork” of state-level restrictions on egg sales could cause “significant challenges for egg producers”.

=== Polling ===
Poll source	Date administered	Yes	No	Don't Know / Undecided	Sample size	Margin of error
WBUR/MassINC	September 7–10, 2016	66%	25%	9%	506	±4.4
WBZ/UMass-Amherst	September 15–20, 2016	75%	14%	11%	700	±4.3
Western New England University Polling Institute	September 24–October 3, 2016	61%	26%	12%	467	± 5.0
WBUR/MassINC Polling group	October 13–16, 2016	66%	28%	7%	502	± 4.4
Suffolk University/Boston Globe	October 24–26, 2016	62%	25%	10%	500	± 4.4
Western New England University	October 23–November 2, 2016	64%	25%	9%	470	± 4.5

Question 3 consistently received higher support than the other ballot measures in opinion polls. Some polls indicated that support for Question 3 was higher among voters younger than 35, women, and people earning $40,000 or less per year.

== Referendum results ==
On November 8, 2016, Question 3 was passed overwhelmingly by Massachusetts voters. The initiative was supported by 2,530,143 (77.6%) of the 3,258,797 votes cast on the issue, with 120,004 blanks. It had majority support in all but 3 of Massachusetts' 351 towns. Question 3 was the first ballot measure to ban the sale of animal products raised under certain conditions, and won the largest majority of any animal protection ballot measure in U.S. history.

An analysis published in the Journal of Agricultural and Resource Economics analyzed town-level votes on Question 3 along with U.S. Census data. The analysis found that, after controlling for demographic factors, support for the referendum correlated positively with a town's support for Democratic Presidential candidate Hillary Clinton and with the town's average income, and correlated negatively with the proportion of a town's residents employed in agriculture. Extrapolating their analysis from this referendum and California's 2008 Proposition 2, the authors predicted that such a measure would have enjoyed majority support in every state in 2016.

== Aftermath ==
Representatives of Citizens for Farm Animal Protection described the vote as a "historic advancement for animal welfare," and said it showed the strength of the American public's desire to reduce farm animals' suffering. Diane Sullivan, of Citizens Against Food Tax Injustice, said the measure would cause food prices to skyrocket, and said "my work on this has just begun".

In 2017, Republican Congressman Jim Sensenbrenner introduced federal legislation that could have nullified Question 3, forbidding states from setting conditions on how businesses outside the state produce goods. Sensenbrenner said that excessive regulation was interfering with economic growth. In 2018, Republican Congressman Steve King introduced an amendment to that year's Farm Bill that would have similarly forbidden states from imposing welfare restrictions on animal products imported and sold in the state, such as those of Question 3. Supporters of this amendment argued that such restrictions posed a threat to American agricultural activities and to the freedom of interstate commerce. The King amendment drew heavy opposition from groups who noted that it would invalidate a wide range of state food-safety, labor, and animal welfare regulations, and it was not adopted into the final bill.

By May 2019, the only farm in Massachusetts that was directly affected by Question 3, Diemand Farm, had transferred one of its three flocks to a cage-free system. The owners estimated that it would cost $80,000 to transition their entire farm's architecture, in addition to incurring additional ongoing labor costs.

=== U.S. Supreme Court challenge ===
On November 17, 2016, the Ninth Circuit dismissed Missouri v. Harris, the lead case against California's ban on the sale of battery cage eggs, without prejudice. The court found that the plaintiff states did not have standing, because they were bringing the case on behalf of specific egg farmers in their jurisdictions, rather than on behalf of their entire populations. The plaintiff states requested for the U.S. Supreme Court to hear the case, and in May 2017 it declined, letting the Ninth Circuit's dismissal stand. On December 4, 2017, a similar coalition of agricultural states re-filed a case against California's law with the Supreme Court, this time arguing that they had standing because their low-income residents would be injured by increased egg prices, as would the prisons and other institutions operated by the states themselves.

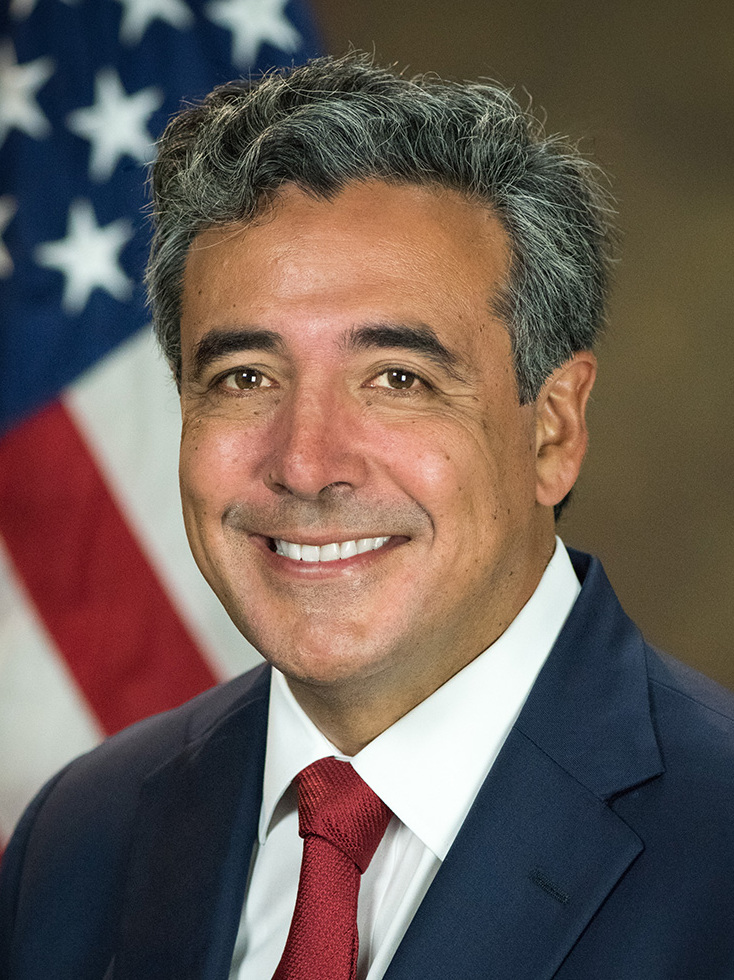
United States Solicitor General Noel Francisco. After he submitted a letter opining that the plaintiff states did not have standing and that Massachusetts's law was not inherently discriminatory, the Supreme Court declined to hear the case.

On December 11, the state of Indiana, joined by twelve other agricultural states, filed a complaint against Massachusetts in the Supreme Court over Question 3. The case brought by Indiana overlapped with that brought by Missouri against California. The plaintiff states argued that Massachusetts's law violated the dormant Commerce Clause, which forbids states from discriminating against or unduly burdening interstate commerce, while Attorney General Healey responded that the plaintiffs' arguments had been tested and rejected by "centuries of precedent". On April 16, 2018, the Supreme Court asked the Solicitor General, at the time Noel Francisco, to give an opinion on whether it should hear both cases.

Francisco's office responded on November 29, 2018. Its filing emphasized that the plaintiff states had still failed to show proper standing, in part because the impact of Question 3 on out-of-state food prices had not been determined, but also discussed the Commerce Clause issue. State laws may violate the dormant Commerce Clause if they explicitly provide different treatment for identical situations found inside or outside the state. The Solicitor General argued that, as the Ninth Circuit noted in its dismissal of Missouri v. Harris, regulations like California's and Massachusetts's treat in- and out-of-state suppliers equally, and are therefore not economically discriminatory in this sense. Under a test established in Pike v. Bruce Church, Inc., if a state statute is not explicitly discriminatory but does affect interstate commerce, the court balances the local interest served by the law against the burden it places on interstate commerce. The Solicitor General opined that a district court, not the Supreme Court, would be the appropriate place to weigh this balance.

On January 7, 2019, the Supreme Court declined to hear both the California and Massachusetts cases, without explanation and with Justice Clarence Thomas disagreeing.

=== Proposed amendment ===
In May 2019, the Massachusetts House approved an amendment to the state budget that would have relaxed Question 3's space requirement, allowing farmers with chickens in cage-free buildings to provide only 1 square foot of space per chicken instead of 1.5, if they also provided additional “enrichments”, such as perches or multi-tiered platforms, meant to allow chickens to engage in more natural behaviors. This amendment was supported by the New England Brown Egg Council as well as by HSUS, which said it represented an improvement to the 2016 law; it was patterned after similar compromises worked out in other states. However, the move drew criticism from other animal protection groups as well as from the Massachusetts Farm Bureau, which had opposed the original ballot initiative but said its members had already invested in new buildings compliant with the 2016 version of the law.

The amendment was dropped in response to the criticism, but reintroduced in October.

=== Related legislation in other states ===
A few months after the passage of Question 3, a nearly identical bill was introduced in the Rhode Island state legislature, with an opinion poll finding 68% support among Rhode Island residents. The bill passed the House by a vote of 61–9 in June 2017, following a public campaign by HSUS; the House had passed similar bills twice before, but they had failed to pass the Senate, in part due to opposition from the representative of a town containing a large egg farm. The bill passed the General Assembly on June 27, and is scheduled to take effect in 2026.

In 2018, California voters passed Proposition 12, which refined 2008 Proposition 2 and imitated Massachusetts Question 3 in banning the sale of eggs, veal, or pork from animals raised with less than certain space requirements. The ballot measure was similarly supported by HSUS and opposed by animal agriculture groups.

In 2019, the legislatures of Oregon and Washington passed bills to phase out the sale of eggs produced by caged hens. The laws were similar to Massachusetts Question 3, and were negotiated between the HSUS and regional egg producers' associations.

== Analysis ==
Several legal scholars have argued that Massachusetts and California's laws pass the Pike test and are therefore constitutional. They point out that courts have ruled that states have a legitimate interest in preventing animal cruelty as their populations understand it, pointing to cases such as Hughes v. Oklahoma. Furthermore, since out-of-state producers are not obliged to sell to the states with stricter welfare regulations, the burden imposed by these regulations is comparatively minimal, as the Ninth and Seventh Circuits have found in cases upholding California and Chicago bans on the sale of foie gras produced by force-feeding geese. A separate Commerce Clause argument against Question 3 is that the law regulates economic activity outside of Massachusetts borders, making it unconstitutional according to the 1935 case Baldwin v. G.A.F. Seelig, Inc. However, U.S. courts have increasingly discarded the Baldwin doctrine as a relic of a less interconnected economy, especially when the law in question does not directly regulate prices.

One of these scholars, Kathryn Bowen, writes that state-level anti-confinement measures such as Question 3 are a laudable expression of "food populism", in which citizens organize for "just, sustainable, and welfare-enhancing food and agriculture outcomes". She predicts that agricultural interests will attempt to preempt and undo such measures at the federal level, through interventions such as Rep. King's amendment, and recommends that states coordinate and harmonize their regulations and efforts to defend them. Another, Sean Murphy, argues that these regulations are bad policy despite being constitutional, because they may harm low-income humans while their benefits to food safety and animal welfare are debatable. He argues for federal preemption of these laws through a legislative process that allows nuanced concerns to be accounted for, praising the failed 2013 compromise legislation agreed on by the HSUS and United Egg Producers, and calls for more detailed and accurate labeling of eggs.

In a 2019 paper, two agricultural economists note that the typical 2016 Massachusetts voter supported banning the sale of intensively confined animal products despite regularly consuming such products themself. They cite several possible explanations from behavioral economics for this apparent discrepancy between individuals’ choices as consumers and as voters. First, individuals may not have been fully informed about the effects of their choices in either case. Second, individuals may have felt that their personal purchasing decisions did not have a meaningful effect on animal welfare, because others will continue to buy low-welfare products, and believed that voting addresses these free-rider problems. Certain consumers may have had a desire to purchase higher-welfare eggs but lacked the willpower to do so, and viewed the referendum as a chance to enforce a choice on themselves. Finally, some evidence suggests that, in the ballot box, individuals value the opportunity to support public goods more than they do in the marketplace.
