= Smith v. United States =

Smith v. United States may refer to:

- Smith v. United States, 508 U.S. 223 (1993), a case about exchanging guns for drugs
- Smith v. United States, 568 U.S. 106 (2013), a case about members leaving a drug conspiracy group
- Smith v. United States, 599 U.S. 236 (2023)
- Smith v. United States, 30 U.S. 292 (1831)
- Smith v. United States, 35 U.S. 326 (1836)
- Smith v. United States, 151 U.S. 50 (1894)
- Smith v. United States, 161 U.S. 85 (1896)
- Smith v. United States, 170 U.S. 372 (1898)
- Smith v. United States, 292 U.S. 337 (1934)
- Smith v. United States, 337 U.S. 137 (1949)
- Smith v. United States, 348 U.S. 147 (1954)
- Smith v. United States, 431 U.S. 291 (1977), a case about federal obscenity prosecutions

== See also ==
- United States v. Smith (disambiguation)
