= United States v. Smith =

United States v. Smith could refer to:

- United States v. Smith, 18 U.S. (5 Wheat.) 153 (1820), on the definition of piracy
- United States v. Smith, 124 U.S. 525 (1888)
- United States v. Smith, 256 U.S. 11 (1921)
- United States v. Smith, 286 U.S. 6 (1932)

== See also ==
- Smith v. United States (disambiguation)
