= United States v. Arjona =

- Supreme Court of the United States

Decided March 7, 1887
- Full case name: United States v. Arjona
- Citations: 120 U.S. 479 (more)

Holding
- It is not necessary for Congress to announce that a statute is intended to enforce international criminal law before that statute may be enforced under the Offenses Clause.

Court membership
- Chief Justice Morrison Waite Associate Justices Samuel F. Miller · Stephen J. Field; Joseph P. Bradley · John M. Harlan; William B. Woods · Stanley Matthews; Horace Gray · Samuel Blatchford

Case opinion
- Majority: Waite, joined by unanimous

Laws applied
- Offenses Clause

United States v. Arjona, 120 U.S. 479 (1887), was a United States Supreme Court case in which the court held that it is not necessary for Congress to announce that a statute is intended to enforce international criminal law before that statute may be enforced under the Offenses Clause.

== Description ==
The challenged law in this case criminalized the counterfeiting of foreign governments' securities.
