= List of United States Supreme Court cases, volume 120 =

Supreme Court of the United States
- Interactive map of Supreme Court of the United States
- 38°53′26″N 77°00′16″W
- Established: March 4, 1789; 236 years ago
- Location: Washington, D.C.
- Coordinates: 38°53′26″N 77°00′16″W
- Composition method: Presidential nomination with Senate confirmation
- Authorised by: Constitution of the United States, Art. III, § 1
- Judge term length: life tenure, subject to impeachment and removal
- Number of positions: 9 (by statute)
- Website: supremecourt.gov

This is a list of cases reported in volume 120 of United States Reports, decided by the Supreme Court of the United States in 1887.

== Justices of the Supreme Court at the time of volume 120 U.S. ==
The Supreme Court is established by Article III, Section 1 of the Constitution of the United States, which says: "The judicial Power of the United States, shall be vested in one supreme Court . . .". The size of the Court is not specified; the Constitution leaves it to Congress to set the number of justices. Under the Judiciary Act of 1789 Congress originally fixed the number of justices at six (one chief justice and five associate justices). Since 1789 Congress has varied the size of the Court from six to seven, nine, ten, and back to nine justices (always including one chief justice).

When the cases in volume 120 U.S. were decided the Court comprised the following nine members:

Portrait	Justice	Office	Home State	Succeeded	Date confirmed by the Senate (Vote)	Tenure on Supreme Court
	Morrison Waite	Chief Justice	Ohio	Salmon P. Chase	January 21, 1874 (63–0)	March 4, 1874 – March 23, 1888 (Died)
	Samuel Freeman Miller	Associate Justice	Iowa	Peter Vivian Daniel	July 16, 1862 (Acclamation)	July 21, 1862 – October 13, 1890 (Died)
	Stephen Johnson Field	Associate Justice	California	newly created seat	March 10, 1863 (Acclamation)	May 10, 1863 – December 1, 1897 (Retired)
	Joseph P. Bradley	Associate Justice	New Jersey	newly created seat	March 21, 1870 (46–9)	March 23, 1870 – January 22, 1892 (Died)
	John Marshall Harlan	Associate Justice	Kentucky	David Davis	November 29, 1877 (Acclamation)	December 10, 1877 – October 14, 1911 (Died)
	William Burnham Woods	Associate Justice	Georgia	William Strong	December 21, 1880 (39–8)	January 5, 1881 – May 14, 1887 (Died)
	Stanley Matthews	Associate Justice	Ohio	Noah Haynes Swayne	May 12, 1881 (24–23)	May 17, 1881 – March 22, 1889 (Died)
	Horace Gray	Associate Justice	Massachusetts	Nathan Clifford	December 20, 1881 (51–5)	January 9, 1882 – September 15, 1902 (Died)
	Samuel Blatchford	Associate Justice	New York	Ward Hunt	March 22, 1882 (Acclamation)	April 3, 1882 – July 7, 1893 (Died)

== Citation style ==
Under the Judiciary Act of 1789 the federal court structure at the time comprised District Courts, which had general trial jurisdiction; Circuit Courts, which had mixed trial and appellate (from the US District Courts) jurisdiction; and the United States Supreme Court, which had appellate jurisdiction over the federal District and Circuit courts—and for certain issues over state courts. The Supreme Court also had limited original jurisdiction (i.e., in which cases could be filed directly with the Supreme Court without first having been heard by a lower federal or state court). There were one or more federal District Courts and/or Circuit Courts in each state, territory, or other geographical region.

Bluebook citation style is used for case names, citations, and jurisdictions.

- "C.C.D." = United States Circuit Court for the District of . . .
  - e.g.,"C.C.D.N.J." = United States Circuit Court for the District of New Jersey
- "D." = United States District Court for the District of . . .
  - e.g.,"D. Mass." = United States District Court for the District of Massachusetts
- "E." = Eastern; "M." = Middle; "N." = Northern; "S." = Southern; "W." = Western
  - e.g.,"C.C.S.D.N.Y." = United States Circuit Court for the Southern District of New York
  - e.g.,"M.D. Ala." = United States District Court for the Middle District of Alabama
- "Ct. Cl." = United States Court of Claims
- The abbreviation of a state's name alone indicates the highest appellate court in that state's judiciary at the time.
  - e.g.,"Pa." = Supreme Court of Pennsylvania
  - e.g.,"Me." = Supreme Judicial Court of Maine

== List of cases in volume 120 U.S. ==
Case Name	Page and year	Opinion of the Court	Concurring opinion(s)	Dissenting opinion(s)	Lower court	Disposition
Wildenhus's Case	1 (1887)	Waite	None	None	C.C.D.N.J.	affirmed
Allen v. St. Louis National Bank	20 (1887)	Gray	None	None	C.C.S.D. Iowa	reversed
Nehmaha County v. Frank	41 (1887)	Matthews	None	None	C.C.D. Neb.	affirmed
United States v. Symonds	46 (1887)	Harlan	None	None	Ct. Cl.	affirmed
United States v. Bishop	51(1887)	Harlan	None	None	Ct. Cl.	affirmed
United States v. Philbrick	52 (1887)	Harlan	None	None	Ct. Cl.	affirmed
United States v. Rockwell	60 (1887)	Harlan	None	None	Ct. Cl.	affirmed
St. Tammany Waterworks v. New Orleans Waterworks	64 (1887)	Harlan	None	None	C.C.E.D. La.	affirmed
Hayes v. Missouri	68 (1887)	Field	None	None	Mo.	affirmed
Forsyth v. Doolittle	73 (1887)	Field	None	None	C.C.N.D. Ill.	affirmed
Huntington v. Saunders	78 (1887)	Miller	None	None	C.C.D. Mass.	affirmed
Heinemann v. Arthur's Executors	82 (1887)	Blatchford	None	None	C.C.S.D.N.Y.	affirmed
Roberts v. Phoenix Mutual Life Insurance Company	86 (1887)	Blatchford	None	None	C.C.D. Ky.	affirmed
United States v. Parker	89 (1887)	Matthews	None	None	C.C.D. Nev.	affirmed
Little Rock and Fort Smith Railroad v. Worthen	97 (1887)	Field	None	None	Ark.	multiple
Kansas Endowment Association v. Kansas	103 (1887)	Waite	None	None	Kan.	dismissed
Gibbs v. Crandall	105 (1887)	Waite	None	None	C.C.W.D. La.	affirmed
United States v. Schlesinger	109 (1887)	Blatchford	None	None	C.C.D. Mass.	affirmed
United States v. Otis	115 (1887)	Blatchford	None	None	Ct. Cl.	affirmed
United States v. Cooper	124 (1887)	Field	None	None	Ct. Cl.	affirmed
United States v. Saunders	126 (1887)	Miller	None	None	Ct. Cl.	affirmed
Kirby v. Lake Shore and Michigan Southern Railway Company	130 (1887)	Harlan	None	None	C.C.S.D.N.Y.	affirmed
Crescent City Livestock Company v. Butchers' Union Slaughterhouse Company	141 (1887)	Matthews	None	None	La.	multiple
Little Rock and Fort Smith Railroad v. Huntington	160 (1887)	Field	None	None	C.C.E.D. Ark.	reversed
Hibernia Insurance Company v. St. Louis Transportation Company	166 (1887)	Blatchford	None	None	C.C.E.D. Mo.	affirmed
United States v. Hill	169 (1887)	Blatchford	None	None	C.C.D. Mass.	affirmed
Phoenix Mutual Life Insurance Company v. Raddin	183 (1887)	Gray	None	None	C.C.D. Mass.	affirmed
Boffinger v. Tuyes	198 (1887)	Matthews	None	None	C.C.E.D. La.	affirmed
Meyers and Levi, Lehman, Godchaux and Company v. Block Brothers	206 (1887)	Bradley	None	None	La.	affirmed
United States v. Ramsay	214 (1887)	Waite	None	None	Ct. Cl.	affirmed
Everhart v. Huntsville College	223 (1887)	Waite	None	None	C.C.N.D. Ala.	reversed
King Iron Bridge and Manufacturing Company v. Otoe County	225 (1887)	Harlan	None	None	C.C.D. Neb.	reversed
United States v. Pacific Railroad	227 (1887)	Field	None	None	Ct. Cl.	reversed
City of Quincy v. Steel	241 (1887)	Miller	None	None	C.C.S.D. Ill.	reversed
United States v. Dunn	249 (1887)	Miller	None	None	Ct. Cl.	affirmed
Indianapolis Rolling Mill Company v. St. Louis, Fort Scogg and Wichita Railroad Company	256 (1887)	Miller	None	None	C.C.D. Kan.	affirmed
Beard v. Nichols	260 (1887)	Waite	None	None	C.C.D. Mass.	affirmed
Schlesinger v. Beard	264 (1887)	Waite	None	None	C.C.D. Mass.	reversed
Bank of Maysville v. Claypool	268 (1887)	Waite	None	None	C.C.D.W. Va.	affirmed
Grant v. Phoenix Mutual Life Insurance Company	271 (1887)	Waite	None	None	Sup. Ct. D.C.	receiver to pay costs
Winchester v. Heiskell, Scott and Heiskell	273 (1887)	Waite	None	None	Tenn.	rehearing denied
In re Snow	274 (1887)	Blatchford	None	None	Dist. Ct. Terr. Utah	reversed
Memphis and Little Rock Railroad v. Dow	287 (1887)	Harlan	None	None	C.C.E.D. Ark.	multiple
Farley v. Kittson	303 (1887)	Gray	None	None	C.C.D. Minn.	reversed
Pensacola Ice Company v. Perry	318 (1887)	Waite	None	None	C.C.N.D. Fla.	reversed
Sherman v. Jerome	319 (1887)	Blatchford	None	None	C.C.E.D. Mich.	reversed
United States v. Northway	327 (1887)	Matthews	None	None	C.C.N.D. Ohio.	certification
The L.P. Dayton	337 (1887)	Matthews	None	None	C.C.S.D.N.Y.	affirmed
Meriwether v. Muhlenburg (sic) County	354 (1887)	Harlan	None	None	C.C.D. Ky.	reversed
Harmon v. Adams	363 (1887)	Matthews	None	None	C.C.N.D. Ill.	affirmed
Durand v. Martin	366 (1887)	Waite	None	None	Cal.	affirmed
Martin v. Thompson	376 (1887)	Waite	None	None	Cal.	dismissed
Speidel v. Henrici	377 (1887)	Gray	None	None	C.C.W.D. Pa.	affirmed
Rolston v. Missouri Fund Commissioners	390 (1887)	Waite	None	None	C.C.W.D. Mo.	multiple
Grier v. Wilt	412 (1887)	Blatchford	None	None	C.C.D. Del.	reversed
Hopt v. Utah	430 (1887)	Field	None	None	Sup. Ct. Terr. Utah	affirmed
Plummer v. Sargent	442 (1887)	Matthews	None	None	C.C.D. Conn.	affirmed
Rosenbaum v. Bauer	450 (1887)	Blatchford	None	Bradley	C.C.D. Cal.	affirmed
Herron v. Dater	464 (1887)	Matthews	None	None	C.C.W.D. Pa.	affirmed
United States v. Arjona	479 (1887)	Waite	None	None	C.C.S.D.N.Y.	certification
Robbins v. Shelby County	489 (1887)	Bradley	None	Waite	Tenn.	reversed
Corson v. Maryland	502 (1887)	Bradley	Waite	None	Md.	reversed
Schuler v. Israel	506 (1887)	Miller	None	None	C.C.E.D. Mo.	affirmed
Laclede Bank v. Schuler	511 (1887)	Miller	None	None	C.C.E.D. Mo.	reversed
Carter County v. Sinton	517 (1887)	Waite	None	None	C.C.D. Ky.	affirmed
Accident Insurance Company v. Crandal	527 (1887)	Gray	None	None	C.C.N.D. Ill.	affirmed
Fletcher v. Fuller	534 (1887)	Field	None	None	C.C.D.R.I.	reversed
People's Savings Bank v. Bates, Reed and Cooley	556 (1887)	Harlan	None	None	C.C.E.D. Mich.	affirmed
Chicago, Burlington and Kansas City Railroad v. Guffey	569 (1887)	Harlan	None	None	Mo.	affirmed
Schley v. Pullman's Palace Car Company	575 (1887)	Harlan	None	None	C.C.N.D. Ill.	affirmed
Gilmer v. Stone	586 (1887)	Harlan	None	None	C.C.S.D. Ill.	affirmed
Marsh v. Nichols	595 (1887)	Waite	None	None	C.C.E.D. Mich.	dismissal denied
Marsh v. Shepard	595 (1887)	Waite	None	None	Mich.	dismissal denied
City of East St. Louis v. Amy and Company	600 (1887)	Waite	None	None	C.C.S.D. Ill.	affirmed
Gonzales v. Ross	605 (1887)	Bradley	None	None	C.C.W.D. Tex.	reversed
Dushane v. Benedict	630 (1887)	Gray	None	None	C.C.W.D. Pa.	reversed
Porter v. Pittsburgh Bessemer Steel Company	649 (1887)	Blatchford	None	None	C.C.D. Ind.	reversed
Baldwin v. Franks	678 (1887)	Waite	None	Harlan; Field	C.C.D. Cal.	reversed
Viterbo v. Friedlander	707 (1887)	Gray	None	None	C.C.E.D. La.	reversed
Ex parte Parker	737 (1887)	Matthews	None	None	Sup. Ct. Terr. Wash.	mandamus granted
Fourth National Bank v. Francklyn	747 (1887)	Gray	None	None	C.C.S.D.N.Y.	affirmed
Bolles v. Town of Brimfield	759 (1887)	Harlan	None	None	C.C.N.D. Ill.	reversed
New Orleans Banking Association v. Le Breton	765 (1887)	Bradley	None	None	C.C.E.D. La.	affirmed
Goodwin v. Fox	775 (1887)	Waite	None	None	C.C.N.D. Ill.	dismissal denied
Leather Manufacturers' National Bank v. Cooper	778 (1887)	Waite	None	None	C.C.S.D.N.Y.	affirmed
Ex parte Harding	782 (1887)	Waite	None	None	Sup. Ct. Terr. Mont.	habeas corpus denied
