= Geer v. Connecticut =

- Supreme Court of the United States

Argued November 22, 1895 Decided March 2, 1896
- Full case name: Edward M. Geer v. State of Connecticut
- Citations: 161 U.S. 519 (more) 16 S. Ct. 600; 40 L. Ed. 793

Holding
- The states owned the wild animals within their borders and could strictly regulate their management and harvest.

Court membership
- Chief Justice Melville Fuller Associate Justices Stephen J. Field · John M. Harlan; Horace Gray · David J. Brewer; Henry B. Brown · George Shiras Jr. Edward D. White · Rufus W. Peckham

Case opinions
- Majority: White, joined by Fuller, Gray, Brown, Shiras
- Dissent: Field
- Dissent: Harlan
- Brewer, Peckham took no part in the consideration or decision of the case.
- Overruled by
- Hughes v. Oklahoma, 441 U.S. 322 (1979)

Geer v. Connecticut, 161 U.S. 519 (1896), was a United States Supreme Court decision, which dealt with the transportation of wild fowl over state lines. Geer held that the states owned the wild animals within their borders and could strictly regulate their management and harvest. According to the Geer Court, "the right to preserve game flows from the undoubted existence in the State of a police power." Although this statement is often quoted by state advocates, it is followed by the qualification that this power reaches only "in so far as its exercise may not be incompatible with, or restrained by, the rights conveyed to the Federal government by the Constitution." The Geer decision supported the view that the states owned all resident wildlife, but at the time there were no conflicting federal wildlife laws.

== See also ==
- Live export
- Missouri v. Holland, 252 U.S. 416 (1920)
- Hunt v. United States, 278 U.S. 96 (1928)
- Kleppe v. New Mexico, 426 U.S. 529 (1976)
