= Burch v. Louisiana =

- Supreme Court of the United States

Argued February 22, 1979 Decided April 17, 1979
- Full case name: Burch v. Louisiana
- Citations: 441 U.S. 130 (more) 99 S. Ct. 1623; 60 L. Ed. 2d 96; 1979 U.S. LEXIS 87

Case history
- Prior: State v. Wrestle, Inc., 360 So. 2d 831 (La. 1978); cert. granted, 439 U.S. 925 (1978).

Holding
- A conviction by a nonunanimous six-person jury in a state criminal trial for a nonpetty offense violates the right of an accused to trial by jury guaranteed by the Sixth and Fourteenth Amendments.

Court membership
- Chief Justice Warren E. Burger Associate Justices William J. Brennan Jr. · Potter Stewart; Byron White · Thurgood Marshall; Harry Blackmun · Lewis F. Powell Jr. William Rehnquist · John P. Stevens

Case opinions
- Majority: Rehnquist, joined by Burger, White, Blackmun, Powell, Stevens
- Concurrence: Stevens
- Concur/dissent: Brennan, joined by Stewart, Marshall

Laws applied
- U.S. Const. amends. VI XIV

Burch v. Louisiana, 441 U.S. 130 (1979), was a case decided by the United States Supreme Court that invalidated a Louisiana statute allowing a conviction upon a nonunanimous verdict from a jury of six for a petty offense. The statute allowed for conviction if only five jurors agreed, and this was held to be a violation of the Sixth Amendment.

== Background ==
Burch was found guilty of showing obscene films by a nonunanimous six-member jury in the state of Louisiana. The court imposed a suspended prison sentence of two consecutive seven- month terms and fined him $1,000.

== Question before the court ==
Does a conviction by a nonunanimous six-member jury in a state criminal trial for a nonpetty offense violate Burch's Sixth Amendment right to trial by jury as applied to the states through the Due Process Clause of the Fourteenth Amendment?

== Decision of the Court ==
Justice Rehnquist cited Ballew v. Georgia, noting that only two other states in the country allowed for a non-unanimous decision from a non-six person jury in a non-petty offense. This "near uniform judgment of the Nation" gave the Court a "useful guide" in determining constitutionally allowable in jury practices.
