= Ambach v. Norwick =

- Supreme Court of the United States

Argued January 10, 1979 Decided April 17, 1979
- Full case name: Ambach v. Norwick
- Docket no.: 76-808
- Citations: 441 U.S. 68 (more)

Holding
- A state may refuse to hire a non-citizen as a public school teacher if they could be but do not wish to become a citizen.

Court membership
- Chief Justice Warren E. Burger Associate Justices William J. Brennan Jr. · Potter Stewart; Byron White · Thurgood Marshall; Harry Blackmun · Lewis F. Powell Jr. William Rehnquist · John P. Stevens

Case opinions
- Majority: Powell, joined by Burger, Stewart, White, Rehnquist
- Dissent: Blackmun, joined by Brennan, Marshall, Stevens

Ambach v. Norwick, 441 U.S. 68 (1979), was a United States Supreme Court case in which the Court held that a state may refuse to hire a non-citizen as a public school teacher if they could be but do not wish to become a citizen.
