= List of United States Supreme Court cases, volume 18 =

Supreme Court of the United States
- Interactive map of Supreme Court of the United States
- 38°53′26″N 77°00′16″W
- Established: March 4, 1789; 237 years ago
- Location: Washington, D.C.
- Coordinates: 38°53′26″N 77°00′16″W
- Composition method: Presidential nomination with Senate confirmation
- Authorised by: Constitution of the United States, Art. III, § 1
- Judge term length: life tenure, subject to impeachment and removal
- Number of positions: 9 (by statute)
- Website: supremecourt.gov

This is a list of cases reported in volume 18 (5 Wheat.) of United States Reports, decided by the Supreme Court of the United States in 1820.

== Nominative reports ==
In 1874, the U.S. government created the United States Reports, and retroactively numbered older privately published case reports as part of the new series. As a result, cases appearing in volumes 1–90 of U.S. Reports have dual citation forms; one for the volume number of U.S. Reports, and one for the volume number of the reports named for the relevant reporter of decisions (these are called "nominative reports").

=== Henry Wheaton ===
Starting with the 14th volume of U.S. Reports, the Reporter of Decisions of the Supreme Court of the United States was Henry Wheaton. Wheaton was Reporter of Decisions from 1816 to 1827, covering volumes 14 through 25 of United States Reports which correspond to volumes 1 through 12 of his Wheaton's Reports. As such, the dual form of citation to, for example, Wallace v. Anderson is 18 U.S. (5 Wheat.) 291 (1820).

== Justices of the Supreme Court at the time of 18 U.S. (5 Wheat.) ==
The Supreme Court is established by Article III, Section 1 of the Constitution of the United States, which says: "The judicial Power of the United States, shall be vested in one supreme Court . . .". The size of the Court is not specified; the Constitution leaves it to Congress to set the number of justices. Under the Judiciary Act of 1789 Congress originally fixed the number of justices at six (one chief justice and five associate justices). Since 1789 Congress has varied the size of the Court from six to seven, nine, ten, and back to nine justices (always including one chief justice).

When the cases in 18 U.S. (5 Wheat.) were decided, the Court comprised these seven justices:

Portrait	Justice	Office	Home State	Succeeded	Date confirmed by the Senate (Vote)	Tenure on Supreme Court
	John Marshall	Chief Justice	Virginia	Oliver Ellsworth	January 27, 1801 (Acclamation)	February 4, 1801 – July 6, 1835 (Died)
	Bushrod Washington	Associate Justice	Virginia	James Wilson	December 20, 1798 (Acclamation)	November 9, 1798 (Recess Appointment) – November 26, 1829 (Died)
	William Johnson	Associate Justice	South Carolina	Alfred Moore	March 24, 1804 (Acclamation)	May 7, 1804 – August 4, 1834 (Died)
	Henry Brockholst Livingston	Associate Justice	New York	William Paterson	December 17, 1806 (Acclamation)	January 20, 1807 – March 18, 1823 (Died)
	Thomas Todd	Associate Justice	Kentucky	new seat	March 2, 1807 (Acclamation)	March 3, 1807 – February 7, 1826 (Died)
	Gabriel Duvall	Associate Justice	Maryland	Samuel Chase	November 18, 1811 (Acclamation)	November 23, 1811 – January 12, 1835 (Resigned)
	Joseph Story	Associate Justice	Massachusetts	William Cushing	November 18, 1811 (Acclamation)	February 3, 1812 – September 10, 1845 (Died)

== Notable Case in 18 U.S. (5 Wheat.) ==
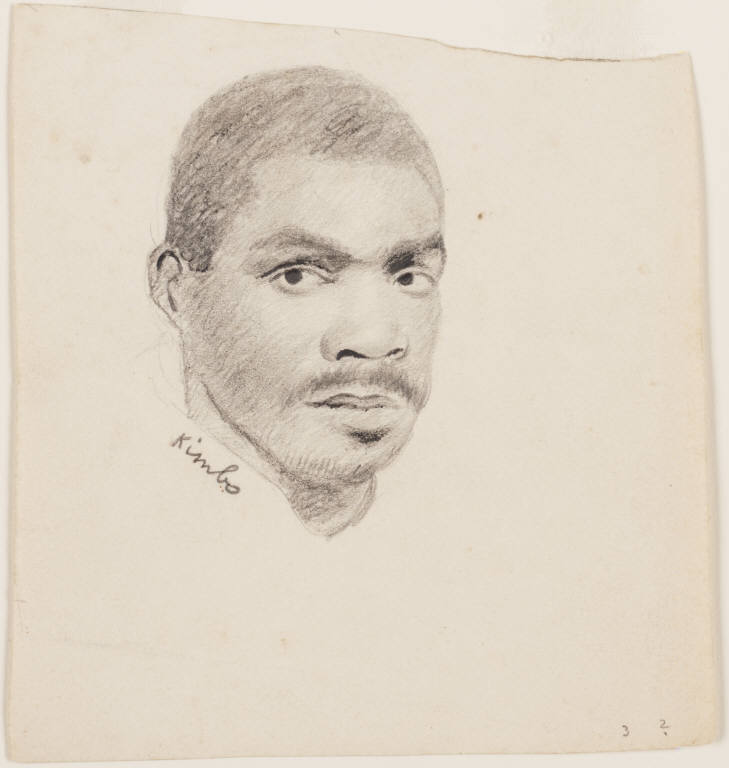
Kimbo, one of 36 men aboard La Amistad, c. 1839–1840

=== La Amistad ===
La Amistad 18 U.S. (5 Wheat.) 385 (1820) was a 19th-century two-masted schooner, owned by a Spaniard living in Cuba. It became renowned in July 1839 for a slave revolt by Mende captives. The ship was eventually taken into American custody in New Orleans. Spain requested President Martin Van Buren to return the African captives to Cuba under a treaty. Litigation followed. Because of issues of ownership and jurisdiction, the case gained international attention. The case was decided by the Supreme Court of the United States in favor of the Mende, restoring their freedom. It became a symbol in the United States in the movement to abolish slavery.

== Citation style ==
Under the Judiciary Act of 1789 the federal court structure at the time comprised District Courts, which had general trial jurisdiction; Circuit Courts, which had mixed trial and appellate (from the US District Courts) jurisdiction; and the United States Supreme Court, which had appellate jurisdiction over the federal District and Circuit courts—and for certain issues over state courts. The Supreme Court also had limited original jurisdiction (i.e., in which cases could be filed directly with the Supreme Court without first having been heard by a lower federal or state court). There were one or more federal District Courts and/or Circuit Courts in each state, territory, or other geographical region.

Bluebook citation style is used for case names, citations, and jurisdictions.

- "C.C.D." = United States Circuit Court for the District of . . .
  - e.g.,"C.C.D.N.J." = United States Circuit Court for the District of New Jersey
- "D." = United States District Court for the District of . . .
  - e.g.,"D. Mass." = United States District Court for the District of Massachusetts
- "E." = Eastern; "M." = Middle; "N." = Northern; "S." = Southern; "W." = Western
  - e.g.,"C.C.S.D.N.Y." = United States Circuit Court for the Southern District of New York
  - e.g.,"M.D. Ala." = United States District Court for the Middle District of Alabama
- "Ct. Cl." = United States Court of Claims
- The abbreviation of a state's name alone indicates the highest appellate court in that state's judiciary at the time.
  - e.g.,"Pa." = Supreme Court of Pennsylvania
  - e.g.,"Me." = Supreme Judicial Court of Maine

== List of cases in 18 U.S. (5 Wheat.) ==
NOTE: Some decisions have alternate pagination, indicated by "{ }."

Case Name	Page & year	Opinion of the Court	Concurring opinion(s)	Dissenting opinion(s)	Lower Court	Disposition
Houston v. Moore	1 (1820)	Washington	Johnson	Story	Pa.	affirmed
United States v. Wiltberger	76 {35} (1820)	Marshall	none	none	C.C.D. Pa.	certification
M'Clung v. Ross	116 {54} (1820)	Marshall	none	none	C.C.D.E. Tenn.	reversed
The Venus	127 (1820)	Johnson	none	none	C.C.D. Ga.	reversed
The London Packet	132 (1820)	Livingston	none	none	C.C.D. Mass.	reversed
United States v. Klintock	144 (1820)	Marshall	none	none	C.C.D. Va.	certification
United States v. Smith	153 {71} (1820)	Story	none	none	C.C.D. Va.	certification
United States v. Furlong	184 (1820)	Johnson	none	none	multiple	certification
Stevenson's Heirs v. Sullivant	207 (1820)	Washington	none	none	C.C.D. Ohio	affirmed
Perkins v. Ramsey	269 {124} (1820)	Todd	none	none	C.C.D. Ky.	affirmed
Mandeville v. Welch	277 {128} (1820)	Story	none	none	C.C.D.C.	reversed
Wallace v. Anderson	291 {134} (1820)	Marshall	none	none	C.C.D. Ohio	reversed
Polk's Lessee v. Wendell	293 (1820)	Johnson	none	none	C.C.D.W. Tenn.	reversed
Marshall v. Beverley	313 (1820)	Livingston	none	none	C.C.D. Va.	reversed
Loughborough v. Blake	317 {146} (1820)	Marshall	none	none	C.C.D.C.	affirmed
Mechanics' Bank v. Bank of Columbia	326 {150} (1820)	Johnson	none	none	C.C.D.C.	affirmed
The Josefa Segunda	338 {156} (1820)	Livingston	none	none	D. La.	affirmed
Blake v. Doherty	359 {165} (1820)	Marshall	none	Johnson	C.C.D.W. Tenn.	reversed
Handly's Lessee v. Anthony	374 (1820)	Marshall	none	none	C.C.D. Ky.	affirmed
La Amistad de Rues	385 (1820)	Story	none	none	D. La.	reversed
Lyle v. Rodgers	394 {181} (1820)	Marshall	none	none	C.C.D.C.	affirmed
United States v. Holmes	412 {189} (1820)	Washington	none	none	C.C.D. Mass.	certification
Owings v. Speed	420 {192} (1820)	Marshall	none	none	C.C.D. Ky.	affirmed
Conn v. Penn	424 {194} (1820)	Marshall	none	none	C.C.D. Pa.	reversed
Campbell v. Pratt	429 {196} (1820)	Johnson	none	none	not indicated	affirmed
The Atalanta	433 (1820)	per curiam	none	none	C.C.D. Ga.	reversed
United States v. Lancaster	434 {198} (1820)	Marshall	none	none	C.C.D. Pa.	dismissed

== See also ==
- certificate of division
