= 2016 Massachusetts Question 2 =

Ballot measure that would have expanded charter schools

Question 2
- Massachusetts Charter School Expansion Initiative

Results
Choice	Votes	%
Yes	1,243,665	38.04%
No	2,025,840	61.96%
Valid votes	3,269,505	100.00%
Invalid or blank votes	0	0.00%
Total votes	3,269,505	100.00%

No
90–100%
80–90%
70–80%
60–70%
50–60%
Yes
90–100%
80–90%
70–80%
60–70%
50–60%
Other
Tie

The Massachusetts Charter School Expansion Initiative, Question 2 was an unsuccessful initiative voted on in the Massachusetts general election held on November 8, 2016. It was one of four 2016 ballot measures put to public vote.

== Voting ==
Question 2 on the ballot, "Charter School Expansion".

- A "yes" vote would give the Massachusetts Department of Elementary and Secondary Education the authority to lift the cap and allow up to 12 new charter schools or to expand existing charter schools each year.
- A "no" vote would leave the current cap in place.

Response	Votes	%
No	2,025,840	60%
Yes	1,243,665	37%
blank	109,296	3%

If the ballot measure had been approved, the proposed law would have taken effect on January 1, 2017.
