= Rosen v. United States =

- Supreme Court of the United States

Argued October 29, 1895 Decided January 27, 1896
- Full case name: Lew Rosen v. United States
- Citations: 161 U.S. 29 (more) 16 S. Ct. 434; 40 L. Ed. 606; 1896 U.S. LEXIS 2135

Holding
- The Court upheld the conviction of the defendant to 13 months hard labor and a fine of $1 for allegedly using the United States Postal Service to send material that was deemed "obscene, lewd and lascivious".

Court membership
- Chief Justice Melville Fuller Associate Justices Stephen J. Field · John M. Harlan; Horace Gray · David J. Brewer; Henry B. Brown · George Shiras Jr. Edward D. White · Rufus W. Peckham

Case opinions
- Majority: Harlan, joined by Fuller, Field, Gray, Brewer, Brown, Peckham
- Dissent: White, joined by Shiras

Rosen v. United States, 161 U.S. 29 (1896), was a case decided by the United States Supreme Court dealing with the concept of obscenity. In a decision written by Justice Harlan, the Court upheld the conviction of the defendant to 13 months hard labor and a fine of $1 for allegedly using the United States Postal Service to send material that was deemed "obscene, lewd and lascivious".

== Background ==
It had been alleged that the defendant had, on April 24, 1893, within the Southern District of New York:

unlawfully, willfully, and knowingly deposit and cause to be deposited in the post office of the City of New York, for mailing and delivery by the post office establishment of the United States, a certain obscene, lewd, and lascivious paper, which said paper then and there, on the first page thereof, was entitled 'Tenderloin Number, Broadway,' and on the same page were printed the words and figures following, that is to say: 'Volume II, number 27; trademark, 1892; by Lew Rosen; New York, Saturday, April 15, 1893; ten cents a copy, $4.00 a year in advance,' and thereupon, on the same page, is the picture of a cab, horse, driver, and the figure of a female, together (underneath the said picture) with the word 'Tenderloineuse,' and the said paper consists of twelve pages, minute description of which, with the pictures therein and thereon would be offensive to the court and improper to spread upon the records of the court because of their obscene, lewd, and indecent matters, and the said paper, on the said twenty-fourth day of April, in the year one thousand eight hundred and ninety-three, was enclosed in a wrapper, and addressed as follows, that is to say: 'Mr. Geo. Edwards, P.O. Box 510, Summit, N.J.' -- against the peace of the United States and their dignity, and contrary to the statute of the United States in such case made and provided.

The defendant, Lew Rosen, had been found guilty and appealed his conviction, arguing that the material the grand jury had found to be obscene had not been specifically identified on the record.

== Opinion of the Court ==
The Supreme Court upheld the conviction. Writing for the Court, Justice Harlan found that because the paper in question had been admitted into evidence and the defendant had not objected, and because he could have requested a bill of particulars that described the paper but chose not to, the indictment sufficiently informed the accused of the nature and cause of the accusation against him.

Justices White and Shiras dissented.
