= United States v. Furlong =

- Supreme Court of the United States

Decided March 1, 1820
- Full case name: United States v. Furlong
- Citations: 18 U.S. 184 (more)

Holding
- Felonies committed in international waters must be specifically defined by Congress, and the Offenses Clause is broad enough that Congress may criminalize offenses on U.S. ships anchored in foreign ports.

Court membership
- Chief Justice John Marshall Associate Justices Bushrod Washington · William Johnson; H. Brockholst Livingston · Thomas Todd; Gabriel Duvall · Joseph Story

Case opinion
- Majority: Johnson, joined by unanimous

Laws applied
- Offenses Clause

United States v. Furlong, 18 U.S. 184 (1820), was a United States Supreme Court case in which the court held that felonies committed in international waters must be specifically defined by Congress, and the Offenses Clause is broad enough that Congress may criminalize offenses on U.S. ships anchored in foreign ports. Essentially, United States v. Furlong made a distinction between international and national jurisdiction. When international law applies (for example, in a case of piracy), the first state to prosecute "uses up" the international law, rendering subsequent prosecutions impossible. However, the prohibition against double jeopardy does not apply if two states have overlapping national jurisdiction (for example, in a case of a murder aboard a foreign ship in a port) and both decide to prosecute.

== Significance ==
The case was about piracy. As a matter of convenience ("legal fiction"), pirates are considered stateless persons aboard stateless ships rejecting any government authority. Their act of "cruising piratically" is a crime "against all", places them outside a jurisdiction of any particular state, and thus is "punished by all". As a result, the double jeopardy prohibition applies: for example, if a pirate suspect is found innocent by the court of one nation, the courts of other nations should recognize this acquittal. The decision of the Supreme Court drew a distinction between piracy and more mundane crimes aboard ships (murder in this case). In the latter situation, the ability to prosecute is subject to the national jurisdiction, which opens the way to international double jeopardy in the courts of nations claiming jurisdiction concurrently. In particular, since the US laws follow "own citizens ... every where", even though these citizens are protected from multiple prosecutions for the same crime under the US law, this protection does not extend to the cases where the accused "are also made amenable to the laws of another State" due to "their own act in subjecting themselves to those laws".

== See also ==
- Criminal law in the Marshall Court
- United States v. Smith (1820)

== Sources ==
- Colangelo, Anthony J. (2018). "Gamble, Dual Sovereignty, and Due Process". Cato Supreme Court Review: 189–214.
