= 2016 Massachusetts elections =

2016 Massachusetts general election
- November 8, 2016

Part of the 2016 United States elections

The 2016 Massachusetts elections were held on November 8, 2016, throughout Massachusetts. At the federal level, all 9 Massachusetts seats in the United States House of Representatives were up for election. At the state level, all 160 seats of the Massachusetts House of Representatives and all 40 seats of the Massachusetts Senate were up for election. Primary elections were held on September 8. Early voting was used for the first time, and took place from October 24 through November 4.

== Federal elections ==
=== Presidential election ===
Official state results from the Massachusetts Secretary of State are as follows

United States presidential election in Massachusetts, 2016
Party	Candidate	Running mate	Votes	Percentage	Electoral votes
Democratic	Hillary Clinton	Tim Kaine	1,995,196	60.8%	11
Republican	Donald Trump	Mike Pence	1,090,893	33.5%	0
Libertarian	Gary Johnson	William Weld	136,784	4.2%	0
Green	Jill Stein	Ajamu Baraka	46,910	1.5%	0
Totals			3,269,783	100.00%	11

== State legislature elections ==
Senate

Affiliation	Candidates	Votes	Vote %	Seats won
Democratic	37	2,053,890	74.60%	34
Republican	16	635,030	23.07%	6
Independent	3	44,426	1.61%	0
Others	N/A	19,806	0.72%	0
Total	56	2,753,152	100%	40

House of Representatives

Affiliation	Candidates	Votes	Vote %	Seats won
Democratic	142	2,037,161	73.78%	125 (▼1)
Republican	50	639,985	23.18%	35 (▲1)
Independent	10	46,236	1.67%	0
United Independent Party	2	8,849	0.32%	0
Green-Rainbow	2	4,740	0.17%	0
Pirate	1	2,680	0.10%	0
Others	N/A	21,409	0.78%	0
Total	207	2,761,060	100%	160

== Ballot measures ==
Four statewide ballot measures were certified for the 2016 ballot.

Number	Initiative title	Subject	Description	Yes	No	Result
Question 1	Massachusetts Expand Slot Machine Gaming Initiative	Gambling	Allow a second slots parlor to exist in Massachusetts	39.3%	60.7%	rejected
Question 2	Massachusetts Charter School Expansion Initiative	Education	Let state education officials approve up to 12 new charter schools a year	37.9%	62.1%	rejected
Question 3	Massachusetts Conditions for Farm Animals Initiative	Animals	Phase out what advocates say are "extreme" methods of farm animal confinement	77.7%	22.3%	approved
Question 4	Massachusetts Legalization, Regulation and Taxation of Marijuana Initiative	Marijuana	Legalize marijuana for recreational use	53.6%	46.4%	approved
