= United States v. Segui =

- Supreme Court of the United States

Decided February 6, 1836
- Full case name: United States v. Bernardo Segui
- Citations: 35 U.S. 306 (more) 10 Pet. 306; 9 L. Ed. 435

Court membership
- Chief Justice vacant Associate Justices Joseph Story · Smith Thompson; John McLean · Henry Baldwin; James M. Wayne

Case opinion
- Majority: Baldwin, joined by unanimous court

United States v. Segui, 35 U.S. (10 Pet.) 306 (1836), was a United States Supreme Court case.

== Parties ==
- Appellant, The United States; represented by Mr. Butler, attorney-general, for the United States
- Appellee, Bernardo Segui; represented by Mr. White.

== Matter ==
Appeal from the superior court for East Florida.

January Term, 1836

Mr Justice Baldwin delivered the opinion of the Court.

This is an appeal from a decree of the judge of the superior court for the eastern district of Florida, confirming the claim of the appellee to sixteen thousand acres (65 km²) of land; pursuant to the Acts of Congress for the adjustment of land claims in Florida.

In the court below, the petition was in the form prescribed by law, presenting a proper case for the jurisdiction of the court.

The claim of the petitioner was founded on his application to the governor of East Florida, for a grant of sixteen thousand acres (65 km²) of land, in consideration of his services to the Spanish government; and for erecting machinery for the purpose of sawing timber. The grant was made by the governor, in absolute property, with a promise of a title in form. The date of the grant was the 6th of December 1814.

It has been suggested by the attorney-general, that though there was no express condition in the grant, one was implied from the consideration being in part the erection of a saw-mill. But we cannot attach any condition to a grant of absolute property in the whole quantity. It was exclusively for the governor to judge of the conditions to be imposed on his grant: he appears to have considered the services of the appellee a sufficient consideration, and made the grant absolute.

The land was surveyed in one tract, at the place called for in the grant, on 2 September 1818. On an inspection of the whole record, we are of opinion that the title of the petitioner to the land surveyed, is valid; and therefore affirm the decree of the court below.

This cause came on to be heard on the transcript of the record from the superior court for the district of East Florida, and was argued by counsel; on consideration whereof, it is ordered, adjudged and decreed by this court, that the decree of the said superior court for the district of East Florida in this cause be, and the same is hereby affirmed.

This is one of the Spanish Land Grant cases from early 19th century Florida. America's highest court ruled on an appeal by the United States of a Florida court's decision to honor a land grant to the appellee of 16,000 acres (65 km²).

== See also ==
- List of United States Supreme Court cases, volume 35
