= Parham v. Hughes =

- Supreme Court of the United States

Argued January 15, 1979 Decided April 24, 1979
- Full case name: Curtis Parham v. Ellis Franklin Hughes
- Citations: 441 U.S. 347 (more) 99 S.Ct. 1742
- Argument: Oral argument

Case history
- Prior: 243 S.E.2d 867 (Ga. 1978).

Holding
- The Georgia statute does not violate the equal protection clause because it is substantially related to the objective of avoiding difficulties in proving paternity after the death of an illegitimate child.

Court membership
- Chief Justice Warren E. Burger Associate Justices William J. Brennan Jr. · Potter Stewart; Byron White · Thurgood Marshall; Harry Blackmun · Lewis F. Powell Jr. William Rehnquist · John P. Stevens

Case opinions
- Majority: Stewart, joined by Burger, Powell, Rehnquist, Stevens
- Concurrence: Powell
- Dissent: White, joined by Brennan, Marshall, Blackmun

Laws applied
- U.S. Const. amend. XIV

Parham v. Hughes, 441 U.S. 347 (1979), was a case the Supreme Court of the United States heard and decided in 1979. The decision upheld a Georgia law that barred fathers of illegitimate children from bringing wrongful death claims without imposing the same burden on mothers.

== Background ==
Lemuel Parham and his mother, Cassandra Moreen, were killed in a car crash. Curtis Parham, Lemuel's father, had never married Moreen, and Curtis never legitimated his son, as he was allowed to do under Georgia law. After the crash, the surviving Parham sued Hughes, the other driver involved in the crash, for wrongful death. Hughes filed a motion for summary judgment on the ground that, under Georgia law, a father could not recover for the wrongful death of an illegitimate child:

“A mother, or, if no mother, a father, may recover for the homicide of a child, minor or sui juris, unless said child shall leave a wife, husband or child. The mother or father shall be entitled to recover the full value of the life of such child. In suits by the mother the illegitimacy of the child shall be no bar to a recovery.”

The trial court held that the statute violated the Due Process and Equal Protection Clauses of the 14th Amendment. The Supreme Court of Georgia reversed, holding that the Georgia statute was subject to and passed rational basis review.

== Decision ==
Writing for a 5-justice majority, Justice Potter Stewart concluded that the Georgia statute did not violate the Constitution of the United States. The majority reasoned that prior Supreme Court decisions striking down laws on the basis of discrimination against illegitimate children were not applicable because the law in question did not favor or disfavor illegitimate children. Rather, the law signaled social "condemnation of irresponsible liaisons beyond the bonds of marriage." The Court went on to conclude that the law did not discriminate on the basis of gender because mothers and fathers are not similarly situated. The Court reasoned that the mother of an illegitimate child is almost always known, whereas the father may not be. Finally, the Court concluded that the law was rationally related to Georgia's interest in maintaining an efficient probate system and that the Due Process Clause of the 14th Amendment did not apply.

Justice Byron White dissented, arguing that the relationship between Georgia's interest in "the integrity of the family unit" was not logically connected to the law in question. He further argued that illegitimate fathers can be harmed by the deaths of their children, even if some subset may, as the majority stated, "suffer[] no real loss from the child's wrongful death."

== See also ==
- Mayeri, Serena. "Foundling Father: (Non-)Marriage and Parental Rights in the Age of Equality". https://www.yalelawjournal.org/article/foundling-fathers. Retrieved 2023-10-19.
