= Protect the Harvest =

Campaign group

Protect the Harvest is a campaign group, formed, in conjunction with Rabbis for Human Rights and in coalition with over twenty Palestinian and Israeli grassroots groups, to support and protect the 2026 Palestinian olive harvest.

== Background ==
Since 2002, Rabbis for Human Rights have supported Palestinian farmers across the West Bank with a protective presence during the seasonal olive harvest, amidst disruptive efforts from settlers and the Israeli state. Over the years, multiple calls to the international community have seen volunteers visit the area to help with the harvest. The 2020s have seen escalating numbers of incidents and levels of violence, and matters came to a head in 2025, with, according to the OHCHR, 178 settler attacks linked to the harvest.

== 2026 campaign ==
Following the 2025 events, in response to a call for assistance, Protect the Harvest was set up to coordinate a wider international protective presence during the 2026 harvest. It was expected to draw in over 100 volunteers. As the harvest season approached, Israeli Defense Minister Israel Katz gave instructions that exclusion orders should be issued against pro-Palestinian activists intending to assist the Palestinian olive growers.

=== Detentions ===
During the October 2026 harvest a multinational group of 90 rabbis and volunteers was detained in the West Bank, including US politician Brad Lander. The group was accompanying Palestinian farmers to harvest olives. The action was similar to previous military closures and international travel denials in response to previous olive harvests, but the detention phase was unusual. Activists assert no permits from the military are required for landowners to harvest their own crops in Area C, and that the area was declared to be a closed military zone after they had been harvesting for several days. The detainees were released after several hours. The detentions drew condemnation from the international community.
