= United States v. Smith (1820) =

- Supreme Court of the United States

Decided February 25, 1820
- Full case name: United States v. Smith
- Citations: 18 U.S. 153 (more)

Holding
- Congress may import the definition of piracy from international law without defining it in the criminal statute with particularity.

Court membership
- Chief Justice John Marshall Associate Justices Bushrod Washington · William Johnson; H. Brockholst Livingston · Thomas Todd; Gabriel Duvall · Joseph Story

Case opinions
- Majority: Story
- Dissent: Livingston

United States v. Smith, 18 U.S. 153 (1820), was a United States Supreme Court case in which the court held that Congress may import the definition of piracy from international law without defining it in the criminal statute with particularity.

== See also ==
- Criminal law in the Marshall Court
- United States v. Furlong
