= List of United States Supreme Court cases, volume 161 =

Supreme Court of the United States
- Interactive map of Supreme Court of the United States
- 38°53′26″N 77°00′16″W
- Established: March 4, 1789; 236 years ago
- Location: Washington, D.C.
- Coordinates: 38°53′26″N 77°00′16″W
- Composition method: Presidential nomination with Senate confirmation
- Authorised by: Constitution of the United States, Art. III, § 1
- Judge term length: life tenure, subject to impeachment and removal
- Number of positions: 9 (by statute)
- Website: supremecourt.gov

This is a list of cases reported in volume 161 of United States Reports, decided by the Supreme Court of the United States in 1896.

== Justices of the Supreme Court at the time of volume 161 U.S. ==
The Supreme Court is established by Article III, Section 1 of the Constitution of the United States, which says: "The judicial Power of the United States, shall be vested in one supreme Court . . .". The size of the Court is not specified; the Constitution leaves it to Congress to set the number of justices. Under the Judiciary Act of 1789 Congress originally fixed the number of justices at six (one chief justice and five associate justices). Since 1789 Congress has varied the size of the Court from six to seven, nine, ten, and back to nine justices (always including one chief justice).

When the cases in volume 161 were decided the Court comprised the following nine members:

Portrait	Justice	Office	Home State	Succeeded	Date confirmed by the Senate (Vote)	Tenure on Supreme Court
	Melville Fuller	Chief Justice	Illinois	Morrison Waite	July 20, 1888 (41–20)	October 8, 1888 – July 4, 1910 (Died)
	Stephen Johnson Field	Associate Justice	California	newly created seat	March 10, 1863 (Acclamation)	May 10, 1863 – December 1, 1897 (Retired)
	John Marshall Harlan	Associate Justice	Kentucky	David Davis	November 29, 1877 (Acclamation)	December 10, 1877 – October 14, 1911 (Died)
	Horace Gray	Associate Justice	Massachusetts	Nathan Clifford	December 20, 1881 (51–5)	January 9, 1882 – September 15, 1902 (Died)
	David Josiah Brewer	Associate Justice	Kansas	Stanley Matthews	December 18, 1889 (53–11)	January 6, 1890 – March 28, 1910 (Died)
	Henry Billings Brown	Associate Justice	Michigan	Samuel Freeman Miller	December 29, 1890 (Acclamation)	January 5, 1891 – May 28, 1906 (Retired)
	George Shiras Jr.	Associate Justice	Pennsylvania	Joseph P. Bradley	July 26, 1892 (Acclamation)	October 10, 1892 – February 23, 1903 (Retired)
	Edward Douglass White	Associate Justice	Louisiana	Samuel Blatchford	February 19, 1894 (Acclamation)	March 12, 1894 – December 18, 1910 (Continued as chief justice)
	Rufus W. Peckham	Associate Justice	New York	Howell Edmunds Jackson	December 9, 1895 (Acclamation)	January 6, 1896 – October 24, 1909 (Died)

== Citation style ==
Under the Judiciary Act of 1789 the federal court structure at the time comprised District Courts, which had general trial jurisdiction; Circuit Courts, which had mixed trial and appellate (from the US District Courts) jurisdiction; and the United States Supreme Court, which had appellate jurisdiction over the federal District and Circuit courts—and for certain issues over state courts. The Supreme Court also had limited original jurisdiction (i.e., in which cases could be filed directly with the Supreme Court without first having been heard by a lower federal or state court). There were one or more federal District Courts and/or Circuit Courts in each state, territory, or other geographical region.

The Judiciary Act of 1891 created the United States Courts of Appeals and reassigned the jurisdiction of most routine appeals from the district and circuit courts to these appellate courts. The Act created nine new courts that were originally known as the "United States Circuit Courts of Appeals." The new courts had jurisdiction over most appeals of lower court decisions. The Supreme Court could review either legal issues that a court of appeals certified or decisions of court of appeals by writ of certiorari.

Bluebook citation style is used for case names, citations, and jurisdictions.

- "# Cir." = United States Court of Appeals
  - e.g., "3d Cir." = United States Court of Appeals for the Third Circuit
- "C.C.D." = United States Circuit Court for the District of . . .
  - e.g.,"C.C.D.N.J." = United States Circuit Court for the District of New Jersey
- "D." = United States District Court for the District of . . .
  - e.g.,"D. Mass." = United States District Court for the District of Massachusetts
- "E." = Eastern; "M." = Middle; "N." = Northern; "S." = Southern; "W." = Western
  - e.g.,"C.C.S.D.N.Y." = United States Circuit Court for the Southern District of New York
  - e.g.,"M.D. Ala." = United States District Court for the Middle District of Alabama
- "Ct. Cl." = United States Court of Claims
- The abbreviation of a state's name alone indicates the highest appellate court in that state's judiciary at the time.
  - e.g.,"Pa." = Supreme Court of Pennsylvania
  - e.g.,"Me." = Supreme Judicial Court of Maine

== List of cases in volume 161 U.S. ==
Case Name	Page & year	Opinion of the Court	Concurring opinion(s)	Dissenting opinion(s)	Lower Court	Disposition of case
Chemical Nat’l Bank v. Hartford D. Co.	1 (1896)	Fuller	none	none	Ill.	affirmed
Belknap v. Schild	10 (1896)	Gray	none	Harlan	C.C.N.D. Cal.	reversed
Rosen v. United States	29 (1896)	Harlan	none	White	C.C.S.D.N.Y.	affirmed
In re Emblen	52 (1896)	Gray	none	none	original	mandamus denied
Harrison v. Fortlage	57 (1896)	Gray	none	none	C.C.E.D. Pa.	affirmed
France v. Connor	65 (1896)	Gray	none	none	Wyo.	affirmed
Ball v. Halsell	72 (1896)	Gray	none	none	C.C.N.D. Tex.	affirmed
Smith v. United States	85 (1896)	Gray	none	none	C.C.W.D. Ark.	reversed
Union P. Ry. Co. v. Callaghan	91 (1896)	Fuller	none	none	8th Cir.	affirmed
Fishback v. Western Union Tel. Co.	96 (1896)	Fuller	none	none	C.C.E.D. Ark.	reversed
New Orleans F.I. v. Glover	101 (1896)	Fuller	none	none	C.C.E.D. La.	order vacated
Beebe v. United States	104 (1896)	Fuller	none	none	C.C.M.D. Ala.	affirmed
Carey v. Houston & T.C. Ry. Co.	115 (1896)	Fuller	none	none	5th Cir.	dismissed
Bank of Comm. v. Tennessee ex rel. City of Memphis	134 (1896)	Peckham	White	White	Tenn.	reversed
Shelby Cnty. v. Union & P. Bank	149 (1896)	Peckham	none	none	C.C.W.D. Tenn.	reversed
Mercantile Bank v. Tennessee ex rel. City of Memphis	161 (1896)	Peckham	none	none	Tenn.	affirmed
Phoenix F. & M. Ins. Co. v. Tennessee	174 (1896)	Peckham	none	none	Tenn.	affirmed
Memphis C. Bank v. Tennessee ex rel. City of Memphis	186 (1896)	Peckham	none	none	Tenn.	affirmed
Planters’ Ins. Co. v. Tennessee ex rel. City of Memphis	193 (1896)	Peckham	none	none	Tenn.	affirmed
Home I. & T. Co. v. Tennessee ex rel. City of Memphis	198 (1896)	Peckham	none	none	Tenn.	affirmed
District of Columbia v. Lyon	200 (1896)	Fuller	none	none	Sup. Ct. D.C.	affirmed
Ainsa v. United States	208 (1896)	Fuller	none	none	Ct. Priv. Land Cl.	affirmed
Durham v. Seymour	235 (1896)	Fuller	none	none	Sup. Ct. D.C.	dismissed
Baltzer v. North Carolina	240 (1896)	White	none	none	N.C.	affirmed
Baltzer & Taaks v. North Carolina	246 (1896)	White	none	none	N.C.	affirmed
Lynch v. Murphy	247 (1896)	White	none	none	Sup. Ct. D.C.	affirmed
Hamilton v. Brown	256 (1896)	Gray	none	none	C.C.W.D. Tex.	affirmed
Davis v. Elmira S. Bank	275 (1896)	White	none	none	N.Y.	reversed
Leighton v. United States	291 (1896)	Brewer	none	none	Ct. Cl.	affirmed
Marks v. United States	297 (1896)	Brewer	none	none	Ct. Cl.	affirmed
Durland v. United States	306 (1896)	Brewer	none	none	C.C.E.D. Pa.	affirmed
Washington G. Co. v. District of Columbia	316 (1896)	White	none	none	Sup. Ct. D.C.	affirmed
Schroeder v. Young	334 (1896)	Brown	none	none	Sup. Ct. Terr. Utah	affirmed
Douglas v. Wallace	346 (1896)	Brown	none	none	N.C.	affirmed
Cochran v. Blout	350 (1896)	Shiras	none	none	Sup. Ct. D.C.	affirmed
Smith v. McKay	355 (1896)	Shiras	none	none	C.C.D. Mass.	dismissed
Graves v. Saline Cnty.	359 (1896)	Shiras	none	none	7th Cir.	certification
Spalding v. Mason	375 (1896)	White	none	none	Sup. Ct. D.C.	affirmed
Hansen v. Boyd	397 (1896)	White	none	none	C.C.D. Minn.	conditional affirmance
United States v. Stanford	412 (1896)	Harlan	none	none	9th Cir.	affirmed
City of Evansville v. Dennett	434 (1896)	Harlan	none	none	7th Cir.	certification
Swearingen v. United States	446 (1896)	Shiras	none	none	D. Kan.	reversed
Union P. Ry. Co. v. O’Brien	451 (1896)	Fuller	none	none	8th Cir.	affirmed
The Delaware	459 (1896)	Brown	none	none	2d Cir.	affirmed
United States v. Zucker	475 (1896)	Harlan	none	none	C.C.S.D.N.Y.	reversed
Spalding v. Vilas	483 (1896)	Harlan	none	none	Sup. Ct. D.C.	affirmed
Spalding v. Dickinson	499 (1896)	Harlan	none	none	Sup. Ct. D.C.	affirmed
Matthews v. United States	500 (1896)	Peckham	none	none	C.C.S.D.N.Y.	affirmed
Ornelas v. Ruiz	502 (1896)	Fuller	none	none	W.D. Tex.	reversed
Dushane v. Beall	513 (1896)	Fuller	none	none	Pa.	reversed
Geer v. Connecticut	519 (1896)	White	none	Field; Harlan	Conn.	affirmed
St. Louis et al. Ry. Co. v. James	545 (1896)	Shiras	none	Harlan	8th Cir.	certification
Gildersleeve v. New Mexico M. Co.	573 (1896)	White	none	none	Sup. Ct. Terr. N.M.	affirmed
Post v. United States	583 (1896)	Gray	none	none	D. Minn.	reversed
Rouse v. Hornsby	588 (1896)	Fuller	none	none	8th Cir.	dismissed
Brown v. Walker	591 (1896)	Brown	none	Shiras; Field	C.C.W.D. Pa.	affirmed
Southworth v. United States	639 (1896)	Brewer	none	none	Ct. Cl.	affirmed
Owens v. Henry	642 (1896)	Fuller	none	none	C.C.E.D. La.	affirmed
Pearsall v. Great N. Ry. Co.	646 (1896)	Brown	none	none	C.C.D. Minn.	reversed
Louisville & N.R.R. Co. v. Kentucky	677 (1896)	Brown	none	none	Ky.	affirmed

== See also ==
- Certificate of division
