= Define and Punish Clause =

Clause in the United States Constitution

The Define and Punish Clause, is the tenth clause in Article I, Section 8 of the United States Constitution. It grants Congress the power to "define and punish Piracies and Felonies committed on the high Seas, and Offences against the Law of Nations." The clause contains the only specific enumerated power in the Constitution that extends Congress' authority outside the territorial limits of the United States.

The Define and Punish Clause was developed to address one of the primary weaknesses of the preceding Articles of Confederation, which had limited the national government's ability to conduct foreign affairs by instead granting states the power to "provide expeditious, exemplary and adequate punishment...for the infractions of the immunities of ambassadors and other public ministers..." Edmund Randolph, a delegate to the Constitutional Convention, cited this arrangement as one of the major "defects" of the Articles, since it left no consistent or uniform recourse for foreign dignitaries and merchants.

However, at the time the Define and Punish Clause was drafted, piracy was the only universal crime that was well-defined by the law of nations, and it was soon addressed by Congress through a federal statute in 1790. Following the U.S. Supreme Court decision in United States v. Furlong (1820), felonies committed in international waters had to be specifically defined by Congress. Determining the grounds on which Congress can define offenses against the law of nations remains unclear due to differing interpretations of the term "law of nations" and its scope. For example, the clause has been interpreted as applying only to conduct for which punishment has been established and articulated in international law, or more narrowly to only piracy. Nonetheless, so long as each relevant law actually responds to international criminal law, Congress does not need to formally announce that the laws are being enacted pursuant to the Define and Punish Clause.
