= Family homelessness =

Socioeconomic phenomenon

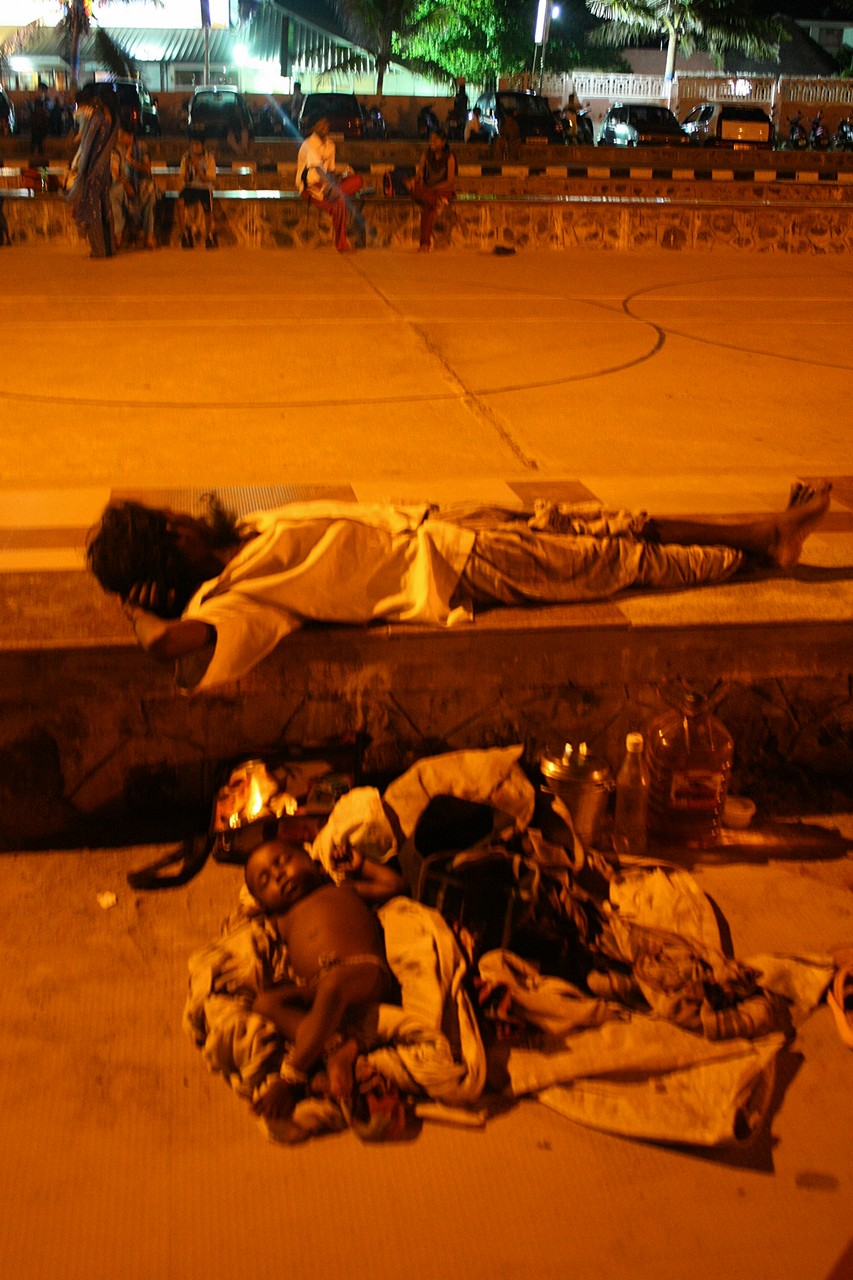
Homeless child pictured sleeping rough with what appears to be their father.

Family homelessness refers to a family unit (often blood related) who do not have access to long term accommodation due to various circumstances such as socioeconomic status, access to resources and relationship breakdowns. In some Western countries, such as the United States, family homelessness is a new form of poverty, and a fast growing group of the homelessness population. Some American researchers argue that family homelessness is the inevitable result of imbalanced "low-income housing ratio" where there are more low-income households than there are low-cost housing units. A study in 2018 projected a total of 56,342 family households were recognized as homeless. Roughly 16,390 of these people were living in a place not meant for human habitation. In 1988, homeless families likely made up about a third of the United States' homeless population, with generally women being the lead of the household.

While scholars differ on conceptualizations of homelessness, whether it is a just temporary state through which people pass or if it is a permanent trait that emanates from individual characteristics, studies indicate for families, homelessness is a temporary state that is often resolved by the provision of subsidized housing. It has been studied that most homeless families stay in homeless shelters for only a short time, and when they exit they typically do not return. About 20 percent have longer stays in shelters, but only a small number of families have repeat stays.

== Contributing Factors to Family Homelessness ==
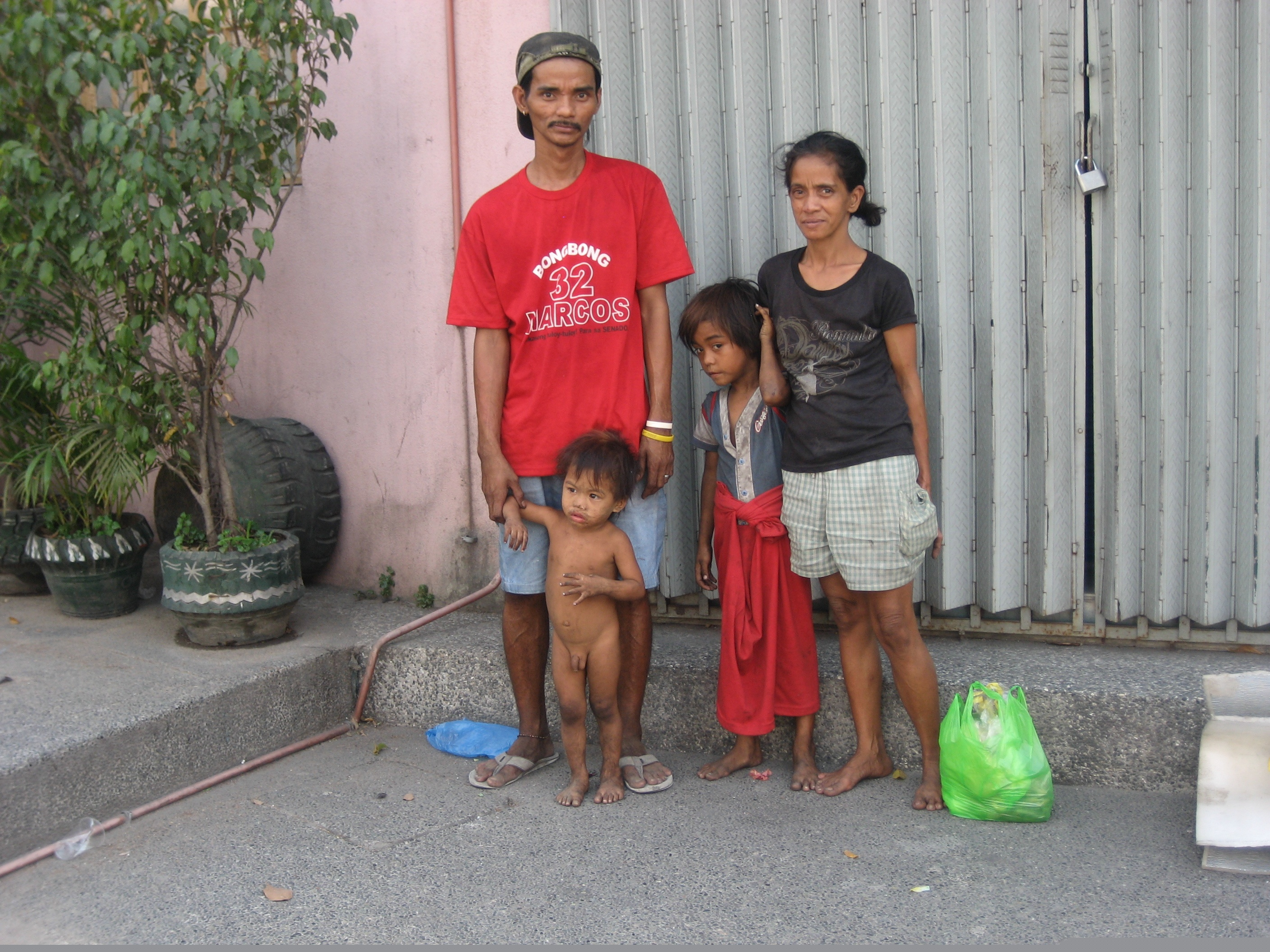
Homeless Family from the Philippines

There are four main factors that increase the chance of a family becoming homeless, these factors are: political, economic, social and environmental. The ability for individuals to have a stable income, access to resources and services or the 'economic' factors are defining in determining the homelessness status of a family.

=== Social Factors ===
The social factors that contribute to family homelessness often refer to domestic violence or relationship breakdowns, inadequate education, poor social relationships and connections, as well as decreased opportunities in life. Social conditions are important in understanding what can cause families to become homeless, such as if a family or individuals have a low level of educational attainment, or decreased connection with their community. This can create difficulty to access support services when in crisis or decrease their ability to secure employment. Moreover, the access low socio-economic families have to support networks and services is crucial in retaining stable housing. These support networks and services are provided by non-government organisations and included in government policies.

=== Economic Factors ===
A significant problem that can arise from low socio-economic families is meeting the demands of higher costs of living in countries such as Australia that can have an expensive and competitive housing market. In Australia between 2005 and 2015 the median property prices grew by almost twice of what they were previously. These increased property houses makes it difficult for low-income households such as those reliant on a singular income and single-parent households to secure stable and affordable housing, increasing their risk of becoming homeless. This is a significant problem in the United States of America due to the vast majority of the housing market being privately funded, whilst economic stability decreases, meaning vulnerable families such as those of low socioeconomic background are at an increased risk of family homelessness. In today's modern economy, with increased prices of living, single mothers are more disproportionately impacted as they only have one flow of income to support: rent, mortgage payments, medical expenses and education expenses.

=== Political Factors and Demographics ===
Demographics particularly aspects concerning gender, marital status and ethnicity are heavily apparent in trends regarding family homelessness. Data analysed from Voices From the Street: Exploring the Realities of Family Homelessness, those at risk of family homeless often include single mothers, women, ethnic minorities and those living in a household where there are more than two children under the age of two.

Political factors such as the welfare support provided by the government and the stability of the political system(corruption, economic status) can contribute to a family becoming homeless. Countries such as the U.S. whilst may have economic stability as a whole, can contain instances of family homelessness due to the lack of welfare programs that support families in need. For example, the United States of America has a weakened system of support for families of low socioeconomic status, as there is a lack of subsidised housing, minimal financial welfare payments and there are few government policies that provide adequate social security measures to support families in crisis. In India, political factors are evident in contributing to the high rates of family homelessness, as the government's policies in regards to housing revolves around ensuring the aesthetics of the city. The government of India in 2017 evicted 260,000 people to remove slums(informal versions of houses that are often overcrowded) in order to retain a sense of beauty to the major urban areas of India.

The lack of affordability for housing poses a challenge for poor people and their ability to maintain housing. Rising costs in housing is one of the many factors in homelessness. An estimated amount of 22% to 57% of all homeless women who report domestic violence note that it was the immediate cause of their homelessness. Addiction plays another large role in homelessness for families. Addiction disturbs functioning families and uproots those living productively. Seeking out substances becomes priority over bill paying, which results in loss of housing, such as eviction. Families without homes contribute to the large number of children in foster care. Child victims of homeless families are shown to suffer more with developmental difficulties such as communication and are predisposed to other mental disorders compared to other families who have low income, yet remained housed. Homeless children pose serious problems when it comes to their success and their future. Such problems include hunger, poor nutrition, developmental delays, anxiety, depression, behavioral problems, and educational underachievement. Social isolation is thought to be more a consequence than a cause of family homelessness.

== Conditions of Family Homelessness ==
Family homelessness, similar to other forms and categories of homelessness often contain more challenges associated with living such as access to adequate health care, social services, employment, shelter and basic necessities.

Family homelessness is not only impactful for individuals economically, but can also create a strain on their health, as due to decreased living standards and means to access medication and health care providers, it can create vulnerability in regards to their health, putting them at risk for contracting infections and worsening pre-existing health conditions. Moreover, being homeless can lower life expectancy, as the Australian Medical Journal states that in some cases, there can be a 30-year age gap in life expectancy between those who are homeless and those who are not Moreover, with decreased stable shelter (particularly families who are living without shelter) have increased risk of catching viruses and infections when outbreaks and epidemics/pandemics occur. For example, with the COVID-19 pandemic there was grave concern for the homeless and their protection against the virus as there is decreased sanitation and hygiene due to limited access to necessities and resources. Homeless shelters that homeless families utilise can increase risk of contracting viruses and infections due to the often overcrowding of these shelters, particularly in highly populated areas such as Los Angeles California that has over 40,000 people living in homeless shelters. Children experiencing family homelessness are also at an increased risk of developing infections, asthma and skin conditions due to lack of medical intervention, as well as living in exposed environments with poor hygiene and sanitation.

Families who struggle with homelessness often have difficulty with social conditions, as they can be disconnected from mainstream society due to their socioeconomic and living status. Social conditions of family homelessness refer to access to social support services, education, skills and training (often those related to employment). Moreover, families who are homeless through their living conditions are often more exposed to crime, alcoholism, violence and drug use. According to several studies conducted by various academic journals, children who experience homelessness can often have trouble adapting to new environments in adulthood and are at higher risk for experiencing trauma and abuse, thus identifying the long-term impacts of the social conditions of family homelessness can have on children and adolescents. Moreover, those who are classified as homeless are not only disconnected from social support networks, but also from meaningful daily interactions with others such as those beyond their immediate family, friends, and their local community. This is attributed to lack of communication devices as well as many homeless families being isolated due to fear of judgement as well as alienation and marginalisation.

A consequence of the conditions that family homelessness can have on individuals, particularly children is delays in cognitive and social development. Due to limited access to medical resources caused by lack of finances, pregnant mothers experiencing homelessness particularly single mothers do not receive the prenatal care required. The effect of inadequate prenatal care on the infant can result in low birth weights, greater chance for hospitalisation and development of asthma. Studies analysed in the book Supporting Families Experiencing Homelessness: Current Practices and Future Directions detail that infants who are raised in family homelessness, particularly families living in shelters often develop issues pertaining to attachment and social development. This is partly caused by the environment of shelters which do not meet basic requirements for an infant to develop at a normal rate due to its conditions such as overcrowding, and lack of stability in relationships as an infant needs a clear circle of caregivers in order to develop socially.

== Family Homelessness Around the World ==
=== Australia ===
A problem that can arise from low socio-economic families is meeting the demands of higher costs of living in countries such as Australia that can have an expensive and competitive housing market. In Australia between 2005 and 2015 the median property prices grew by almost twice of what they were previously, increasing a low socioeconomic family's risk of becoming homeless.

=== America ===
Family homelessness in America is a vast and widespread issue with school-aged children making up one million of America's homeless population (Donley, Crisafi, Mullins, & Wright, 2017, p. 48). Moreover, family homelessness has become of particular concern with the discussion of homelessness, as family homelessness is the fastest growing sector of the homelessness population as of 2013, comprising 36% of the homeless population. Within industrialized nations, the numbers of homeless families in the United States are at the top. Roughly 1.6 million youth will experience homelessness throughout a one year span. One in thirty children in the U.S. have or will experience homelessness.

Most frequently, a homeless family in a shelter will be a mother with her children. The mother in these situations has less than a 50% chance of graduating high school, and usually have suffered from either physical or mental abuse. Usually these children are still at a very young age, not having the ability to venture out and provide for themselves. Many of the homeless shelters directed for families will not allow an adult male into the premises, causing the split of some families who had previously stuck together.

The ethnicity of the individuals in these family shelters ranges by percentages. The most common homeless families are Caucasian (white) Americans. African Americans hold 14% of the population in total, but 40% when it comes to homelessness. It has been shown that racial minorities tend to have a larger number of homeless individuals when compared to their population in general.

=== Asia ===
Family Homelessness in Asia is evident throughout the continent due to a combination of environmental, political and social factors that limits an at‐risk family's access to suitable housing. Countries in Asia and the Pacific such as India and Cambodia have above normal rates of family homelessness, partially caused by the exacerbated poverty existing in these countries. According to the Homeless World Cup Foundation, 73 million families in India lack access to suitable housing due to lack of government programs to elevate family homelessness, as well as the widespread poverty evident in the country. Countries in Asia such as India, often have weakened government support for families struggling with homelessness due to the belief in a class/caste system that discourages those in homelessness as it does not align with the social beliefs held by the government and a portion of the population. Moreover, environmental conditions are also influencing in the homelessness status of families in Asia due to the difficulties associated with the climate. Countries such as Cambodia are highly susceptible to natural disasters such as monsoons and droughts due to the moist and tropical climate. The destruction caused by these natural disasters can displace families due to a lack of shelter and can elevate the pre-existing poverty as plains and crops that are used for agricultural production are often damaged during natural disasters.

=== Africa ===
Africa is a continent that experiences high rates of family homelessness due to widespread poverty, conflict and harsh environmental conditions that impact living standards and access to basic necessities. South Africa is a country within Africa that experiences high rates of family homelessness as economic inequality within the country is evident as 79% of the population live under the poverty line, as well as an unemployment rate of 28%. With minimal financial security, access to basic necessities such as food and water are limited, family homelessness has become a common occurrence. Family homelessness impacts children in South Africa, as children not only have poor access to healthcare, but many are unable to attend school.

== Support and Resources ==
=== Accommodation ===
Families who struggle with homelessness are placed into certain types of accommodation such as 'crisis' or 'short term' accommodation by social welfare services as described by Johnson and Watson on page 213. Crisis and short-term accommodation include refuges and shelters, where residency is based on a temporary basis until homeless families can be moved into 'transitional housing'. Transitional housing is created with the intent to ease the transition into independent and sustainable long-term residency. These accommodation services are often heavily subsidised as those accessing the accommodation programs often do not have the means to meet market rent prices. When engaging with short term or long-term accommodation, homeless families can be assigned with a caseworker. Caseworkers provide support to homeless families, by assisting with employment opportunities, living skills and securing long term accommodation in order to ease the burden associated with family homelessness. Data that identifies the level of success associated with these accommodation programs is unavailable due to minimal follow-up with those who move into long-term independent living

=== The Role of Non-Government Organisations ===
NGOs or Non-government organisations can often assist with easing the burdens associated with being homeless through providing access to support workers, programs and assistance with finding long-term accommodation. In some countries, such as Australia, the state or federal governments often redirect dealing with family homelessness to non-government organisations as they are often more equipped to deal with the issue, and the government can become overwhelmed, especially in countries where family homelessness occurs at high rates. For example, the recent COVID-19 crisis has worsened the issue of family homelessness due to a loss of income for many. However, non-government organisations such as The Salvation Army and Wayside Chapel have been instrumental in supporting those experiencing family homelessness through providing accommodation and counselling services, in order to ease the pressure on the Australian Government whilst dealing with the global pandemic.

=== Examples of Non-Government Organisations ===
==== Mission Australia ====
Mission Australia is a homelessness charity that aims to provide stable and safe housing to all Australians. They conduct their work through visiting local communities where homelessness rates are high and developing sustainable economic plans to provide more secure housing. Moreover, the provide access to shelter for those who need it.

==== Kids Under Cover ====
Kids Under Cover is a not-for-profit organisation based in Australia that primarily focuses on assisting children affected by family homelessness (children and young people aged between 12 and 25 years). They work on restoring relationships between children and their family in the midst of relationship breakdowns, assists with providing education to children through educational scholarships and help secure access to employment.

==== Family Promise ====
Family Promise is an American organisation dedicated to the issue of family homelessness, through supporting low-income families and helping them to secure stable housing. They provide many community programs to establish social connections within the community. They also provide assistance with accessing education, and provide food to those struggling with family homelessness.

== Solutions ==
Some American researchers argue that social programs, such as rental subsidies, that either reduce poverty or increase the supply of affordable housing will be effective in lowering the total number of homeless families. In the United States, Section 8 certificates are used to help provide housing, as the household pays about 30% of its income toward rent, and the federal government funds the other 70%. Emergency shelter grants provide basic shelter and essential supportive services. It also can be used for short-term homeless prevention assistance to persons at imminent risk of losing their own housing due to eviction, foreclosure, or utility shutoffs.
