= Hughes v. Oklahoma =

- Supreme Court of the United States

Argued January 9, 1979 Decided April 24, 1979
- Full case name: William Hughes v. Oklahoma
- Citations: 441 U.S. 322 (more) 99 S. Ct. 1727; 60 L. Ed. 2d 250; 1979 U.S. LEXIS 35

Case history
- Prior: Appeal from the Court of Criminal Appeals of Oklahoma

Holding
- The Congress may enact legislation governing wildlife on federal lands. When conflicting state law exists, the supremacy clause ensures that federal legislation will prevail.

Court membership
- Chief Justice Warren E. Burger Associate Justices William J. Brennan Jr. · Potter Stewart; Byron White · Thurgood Marshall; Harry Blackmun · Lewis F. Powell Jr. William Rehnquist · John P. Stevens

Case opinions
- Majority: Brennan, joined by Stewart, White, Marshall, Blackmun, Powell, Stevens
- Dissent: Rehnquist, joined by Burger
- This case overturned a previous ruling or rulings
- Geer v. Connecticut (1896)

Hughes v. Oklahoma, 441 U.S. 322 (1979), was a United States Supreme Court decision, which held that the United States Congress may enact legislation governing wildlife on federal lands.

== Background ==
Oklahoma enacted statutes that prevented any person from selling minnows found within the natural waters of the state of Oklahoma outside of the state of Oklahoma. Oklahoma claimed that the purpose of the statute was for wildlife conservation. The underlying legal controversy arose when William Hughes was convicted of shipping minnows fished from Oklahoma waters out of the state.

== Opinion of the Court ==
The Supreme Court held that the statute violated the Dormant Commerce Clause because it discriminated the flow of interstate commerce without being the least discriminatory alternative. The Court stated that when conflicting state law exists, the Supremacy Clause ensures that federal legislation will prevail. The Court thereby overruled Geer v. Connecticut (1896), rejecting the earlier case's "19th century legal fiction of state ownership" of wildlife. In the Court's view, this "fiction" had "been eroded to the point of virtual extinction in cases involving regulation of wild animals." With the fall of Geer, the last precedential impediment to the federal government's wildlife management authority was removed.

== See also ==
- List of United States Supreme Court cases, volume 441
