= List of United States Supreme Court cases, volume 441 =

This is a list of all the United States Supreme Court cases from volume 441 of the United States Reports:

Case name	Citation	Date decided
Broad. Music, Inc. v. CBS	441 U.S. 1	1979
Alexander v. Dept. of HUD	441 U.S. 39	1979
Ambach v. Norwick	441 U.S. 68	1979
Gladstone, Realtors v. Village of Bellwood	441 U.S. 91	1979
Burch v. Louisiana	441 U.S. 130	1979
Ariz. Pub. Serv. Co. v. Snead	441 U.S. 141	1979
Herbert v. Lando	441 U.S. 153	1979
Douglas Oil Co. v. Petrol Stops Nw.	441 U.S. 211	1979
Dalia v. United States	441 U.S. 238	1979
Chrysler Corp. v. Brown	441 U.S. 281	1979
Hughes v. Oklahoma	441 U.S. 322	1979
Parham v. Hughes	441 U.S. 347	1979
North Carolina v. Butler	441 U.S. 369	1979
Caban v. Mohammed	441 U.S. 380	1979
Addington v. Texas	441 U.S. 418	1979
Japan Line, Ltd. v. Los Angeles Cnty.	441 U.S. 434	1979
Toll v. Moreno	441 U.S. 458	1979
Smith v. Highway Emp.	441 U.S. 463	1979
Wilkins v. United States	441 U.S. 468	1979
Burks v. Lasker	441 U.S. 471	1979
Ford Motor Co. v. NLRB	441 U.S. 488	1979
United States v. 564.54 Acres of Monroe & Pike Cnty. Land	441 U.S. 506	1979
The Takings Clause only requires payment of fair market value to a landowner.
Bell v. Wolfish	441 U.S. 520	1979
Chapman v. Houston Welfare Rts. Org.	441 U.S. 600	1979
Cannon v. Univ. of Chicago	441 U.S. 677	1979
Oscar Mayer & Co. v. Evans	441 U.S. 750	1979
United States v. Naftalin	441 U.S. 768	1979
United States v. Timmreck	441 U.S. 780	1979
Kentucky v. Whorton	441 U.S. 786	1979
Connor v. Coleman	441 U.S. 792	1979
