= List of United States Supreme Court cases, volume 35 =

Supreme Court of the United States
- Interactive map of Supreme Court of the United States
- 38°53′26″N 77°00′16″W
- Established: March 4, 1789; 236 years ago
- Location: Washington, D.C.
- Coordinates: 38°53′26″N 77°00′16″W
- Composition method: Presidential nomination with Senate confirmation
- Authorised by: Constitution of the United States, Art. III, § 1
- Judge term length: life tenure, subject to impeachment and removal
- Number of positions: 9 (by statute)
- Website: supremecourt.gov

This is a list of cases reported in volume 35 (10 Pet.) of United States Reports, decided by the Supreme Court of the United States in 1836.

== Nominative reports ==
In 1874, the U.S. government created the United States Reports, and retroactively numbered older privately published case reports as part of the new series. As a result, cases appearing in volumes 1–90 of U.S. Reports have dual citation forms; one for the volume number of U.S. Reports, and one for the volume number of the reports named for the relevant reporter of decisions (these are called "nominative reports").

=== Richard Peters, Jr. ===
Starting with the 26th volume of U.S. Reports, the Reporter of Decisions of the Supreme Court of the United States was Richard Peters, Jr. Peters was Reporter of Decisions from 1828 to 1843, covering volumes 26 through 41 of United States Reports which correspond to volumes 1 through 16 of his Peters's Reports. As such, the dual form of citation to, for example, Ringo v. Binns is 35 U.S. (10 Pet.) 269 (1836).

== Justices of the Supreme Court at the time of 35 U.S. (10 Pet.) ==
The Supreme Court is established by Article III, Section 1 of the Constitution of the United States, which says: "The judicial Power of the United States, shall be vested in one supreme Court . . .". The size of the Court is not specified; the Constitution leaves it to Congress to set the number of justices. Under the Judiciary Act of 1789 Congress originally fixed the number of justices at six (one chief justice and five associate justices). Since 1789 Congress has varied the size of the Court from six to seven, nine, ten, and back to nine justices (always including one chief justice).

When the cases in 35 U.S. (10 Pet.) were decided, the Court was missing two members: Gabriel Duvall had resigned in January 1835 and was not replaced by Philip P. Barbour until May 1836; Chief Justice John Marshall had died in July 1835 and was not replaced by Roger Taney until March 1836. So, the Court temporarily comprised these five justices:

Portrait	Justice	Office	Home State	Succeeded	Date confirmed by the Senate (Vote)	Tenure on Supreme Court
	Joseph Story	Associate Justice	Massachusetts	William Cushing	November 18, 1811 (Acclamation)	February 3, 1812 – September 10, 1845 (Died)
	Smith Thompson	Associate Justice	New York	Henry Brockholst Livingston	December 9, 1823 (Acclamation)	September 1, 1823 – December 18, 1843 (Died)
	John McLean	Associate Justice	Ohio	Robert Trimble	March 7, 1829 (Acclamation)	January 11, 1830 – April 4, 1861 (Died)
	Henry Baldwin	Associate Justice	Pennsylvania	Bushrod Washington	January 6, 1830 (41–2)	January 18, 1830 – April 21, 1844 (Died)
	James Moore Wayne	Associate Justice	Georgia	William Johnson	January 9, 1835 (Acclamation)	January 14, 1835 – July 5, 1867 (Died)

== Citation style ==
Under the Judiciary Act of 1789 the federal court structure at the time comprised District Courts, which had general trial jurisdiction; Circuit Courts, which had mixed trial and appellate (from the US District Courts) jurisdiction; and the United States Supreme Court, which had appellate jurisdiction over the federal District and Circuit courts—and for certain issues over state courts. The Supreme Court also had limited original jurisdiction (i.e., in which cases could be filed directly with the Supreme Court without first having been heard by a lower federal or state court). There were one or more federal District Courts and/or Circuit Courts in each state, territory, or other geographical region.

Bluebook citation style is used for case names, citations, and jurisdictions.

- "C.C.D." = United States Circuit Court for the District of . . .
  - e.g.,"C.C.D.N.J." = United States Circuit Court for the District of New Jersey
- "D." = United States District Court for the District of . . .
  - e.g.,"D. Mass." = United States District Court for the District of Massachusetts
- "E." = Eastern; "M." = Middle; "N." = Northern; "S." = Southern; "W." = Western
  - e.g.,"C.C.S.D.N.Y." = United States Circuit Court for the Southern District of New York
  - e.g.,"M.D. Ala." = United States District Court for the Middle District of Alabama
- "Ct. Cl." = United States Court of Claims
- The abbreviation of a state's name alone indicates the highest appellate court in that state's judiciary at the time.
  - e.g.,"Pa." = Supreme Court of Pennsylvania
  - e.g.,"Me." = Supreme Judicial Court of Maine

== List of cases in 35 U.S. (10 Pet.) ==
NOTE: Some decisions have alternate pagination, indicated by "{ }."

Case Name	Page and year	Opinion of the Court	Concurring opinion(s)	Dissenting opinion(s)	Lower court	Disposition
Dubois v. Hepburn	1 (1836)	Baldwin	none	none	C.C.W.D. Pa.	reversed
Owings v. Tiernan's Lessee	24 (1836)	Story	none	none	C.C.D. Ky.	continued
Harris v. Elliott	25 (1836)	Thompson	none	none	C.C.D. Mass.	certification
Tucker's Lessee v. Moreland	58 {43} (1836)	Story	none	none	C.C.D.C.	affirmed
Tracy v. Swartwout	80 (1836)	McLean	none	none	C.C.S.D.N.Y.	reversed
Soulard's Heirs v. United States	100 (1836)	Baldwin	none	none	D. Mo.	multiple
Hook v. Linton	107 (1836)	per curiam	none	none	E.D. La.	dismissed
Hobart v. Drogan	108 (1836)	Story	none	none	S.D. Ala.	affirmed
United States v. Hawkins's Heirs	125 (1836)	Wayne	none	none	E.D. La.	reversed
Elliott v. Swartwout	137 (1836)	Thompson	none	none	C.C.S.D.N.Y.	certification
Hagan v. Foison	160 (1836)	Story	none	none	S.D. Ala.	continued
Ventress v. Smith	161 (1836)	Thompson	none	none	D. Miss.	affirmed
Boone v. Chiles	177 {133} (1836)	Baldwin	none	McLean	C.C.D. Ky.	reversed
Sprigg v. Bank of Mt. Pleasant	257 (1836)	Thompson	none	none	C.C.D. Ohio	affirmed
Ringo v. Binns	269 (1836)	Wayne	none	none	C.C.D. Ky.	multiple
Haydel v. Girod	283 (1836)	McLean	none	none	E.D. La.	affirmed
Davis v. Braden	286 (1836)	Thompson	none	none	C.C.D.W. Tenn.	certification
Keene v. Clark's Heirs	291 (1836)	Story	none	none	La.	dismissed
Leland v. Wilkinson	294 {223} (1836)	McLean	none	none	C.C.D.R.I.	certification
Gilman v. Rives	298 {227} (1836)	Story	none	none	C.C.D.W. Tenn.	affirmed
United States v. Fernandez	303 {231} (1836)	Baldwin	none	none	Fla. Super. Ct.	affirmed
United States v. Segui	306 (1836)	Baldwin	none	none	Fla. Super. Ct.	affirmed
United States v. Chaires	308 (1836)	Baldwin	none	none	Fla. Super. Ct.	affirmed
United States v. Seton	309 (1836)	Baldwin	none	none	Fla. Super. Ct.	affirmed
United States v. Sibbald	313 {239} (1836)	Baldwin	none	none	Fla. Super. Ct.	multiple
Smith v. United States	326 {250} (1836)	Baldwin	none	none	D. Mo.	affirmed
Wherry v. United States	338 {260} (1836)	Baldwin	none	none	D. Mo.	affirmed
MacKey v. United States	340 {261} (1836)	Baldwin	none	none	D. Mo.	reversed
United States v. Bradley	343 (1836)	Story	none	none	C.C.D.C.	reversed
Smith v. Vaughan	366 (1836)	per curiam	none	none	C.C.D. Pa.	dismissed
Crowell v. Randell	368 {285} (1836)	Story	none	none	Del.	dismissed
Hagan v. Lucas	400 {311} (1836)	McLean	none	none	S.D. Ala.	affirmed
Macomb v. Armstead	407 {317} (1836)	per curiam	none	none	Ct. App. Terr. Fla.	motion overruled
Packer v. Nixon	408 (1836)	Story	none	none	C.C.E.D. Pa.	certification
Ellicott v. Pearl	412 {322} (1836)	Story	none	none	C.C.D. Ky.	affirmed
Owings v. Tiernan's Lessee	447 (1836)	per curiam	none	none	C.C.D. Ky.	continued
Voorhees v. Jackson	449 {353} (1836)	Baldwin	none	none	C.C.D. Ohio	affirmed
Jackson v. Ashton	480 {378} (1836)	Story	none	none	C.C.E.D. Pa.	amendment denied
Lee v. Dick	482 {380} (1836)	Thompson	none	none	C.C.D.W. Tenn.	reversed
Brown v. Swann	497 {392} (1836)	Wayne	none	none	C.C.D.C.	reversed
Columbia Insurance Company v. Lawrence	507 (1836)	Story	none	none	C.C.D.C.	reversed
Stanley v. Gadsby	521 {411} (1836)	Wayne	none	none	C.C.D.C.	affirmed
Denn v. Reid	524 (1836)	McLean	none	none	C.C.D.W. Tenn.	certification
Peter v. Beverly	532 {419} (1836)	Thompson	none	none	C.C.D.C.	reversed
Dickins v. Beal	572 {451} (1836)	Baldwin	none	none	C.C.D.W. Tenn.	affirmed
Wallingsford v. Allen	583 {460} (1836)	Wayne	none	none	C.C.D.C.	affirmed
Brent v. Bank of Washington	596 (1836)	Baldwin	none	none	C.C.D.C.	affirmed
United States v. Gardner	618 (1836)	Thompson	none	none	C.C.D.N.J.	certification
McLearn v. Wallace	625 (1836)	McLean	none	none	C.C.D. Ga.	reversed
Wetmore v. United States	647 (1836)	Wayne	none	none	D. Mo.	affirmed
Clarke v. Kownslar	657 (1836)	Story	none	none	C.C.D.C.	affirmed
City of New Orleans v. United States	662 {526} (1836)	McLean	none	none	E.D. La.	reversed

== See also ==
- Certificate of division
