= The Phoenix Companies =

Financial services company

- Industry: Financial services Life insurance
- Founded: 1851
- Headquarters: Hartford, Connecticut
- Parent: Nassau Financial Group (2016)
- Website: nfg.com

The Phoenix Companies, Inc., is a financial services company that traces its origins to 1851.

Phoenix was acquired by Nassau Financial Group in 2016 and remains headquartered in Hartford, Connecticut, with 650 employees as of 2015.

== History ==
The Phoenix Companies comprises a number of businesses that trace their origins to the mid-19th century.

=== 19th century ===
In 1851, the oldest predecessor of The Phoenix Companies, The American Temperance Life Insurance Company, was founded. The American Temperance Life Insurance Company was a part-mutual, part-stock company that insured only those who abstained from alcohol and was founded by a group of prominent Hartford businessmen as well as religious and civic leaders. As the temperance movement began to wane, American Temperance Life Insurance Company changed its name to Phoenix Mutual Life Insurance Company in 1860, accepting all customers. The company's new name is in reference to the mythological phoenix, rather than the city of Phoenix, Arizona, which had yet to be established at the time of the name change.

In 1857, an agent from the Phoenix Companies, Sylvester M. Wait, assigned the name Phoenix, named after the company, to a small town in Southern Oregon.

In 1860, another early predecessor, the Home Life Insurance Company was formed in Brooklyn, New York, and was the first life insurer authorized by the New York Insurance Department. In 1894, Home Life built its 16-story headquarters, the Home Life Insurance Company Building, on Broadway in New York City, which as one of the world's first steel-framed skyscrapers for a short time was one of the world's tallest buildings.

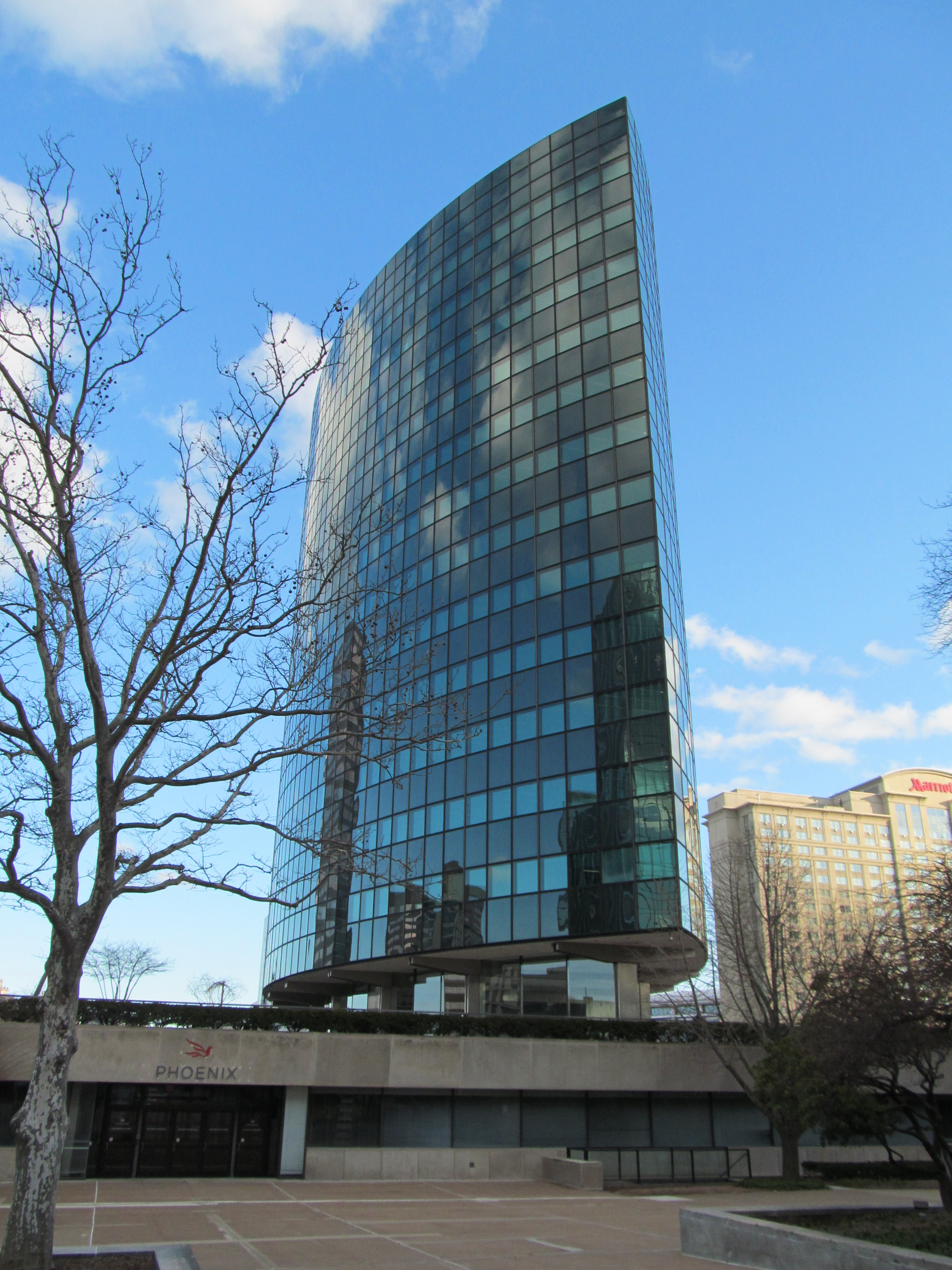
The company's headquarters in Hartford, Connecticut

=== 20th century ===
In the early 20th century, the company pioneered several innovations in the marketing of insurance. In 1901, Phoenix published The Field, believed to be the first agent newsletter and in 1906 produced "A Prospectus and Ten Lessons Upon Life Insurance," the first agent training course used by a life insurance company. In 1912, Phoenix became the first life insurance company to use direct mail advertising. In 1923, Phoenix created the first advertisement to promote the value of life insurance and then in 1926, runs advertisements for its retirement income plan in national magazines, with the tag line, "You don't have to be rich to retire at 55 on $200 a month."

Phoenix pioneered other innovations, including offering reduced life insurance premium rates for women for the first time in 1955 and selling group life and health insurance plans to small businesses in 1957. In 1967, Phoenix is the first insurer to offer discounted premiums to nonsmokers.

=== Since 1992 ===
Phoenix and Home Life completed a merger in 1992 to create the Phoenix Home Life Mutual Insurance Company. At the time of the merger, the combined company would become the 13th-largest mutual life insurance company in the U.S., with assets of nearly $11 billion. The combined company was headquartered in Hartford, where Phoenix was based and the bulk of the senior management of the company came from the Phoenix side of the merger.

In 1995, Phoenix merged its asset management subsidiary, Phoenix Securities Group, with Duff & Phelps, forming Phoenix Duff & Phelps Corporation (later renamed Phoenix Investment Partners), which was publicly held for five years.

In 2001, Phoenix converted from a mutual to a stock company. The company is renamed The Phoenix Companies, Inc., and listed on the New York Stock Exchange under the symbol of PNX. At the same time, Phoenix Home Life Mutual Insurance Company changed its name to Phoenix Life Insurance Company.

In 2008, Phoenix spun off its asset management subsidiary to shareholders as an independent publicly traded company renamed Virtus Investment Partners.

In 2011, Phoenix sold its Goodwin Capital Advisers subsidiary to Conning & Company.

In September 2015, Phoenix announced it was being acquired by Nassau Reinsurance Group, a privately held company, for $217.2 million. The acquisition closed on June 20, 2016 and Phoenix became a private company.

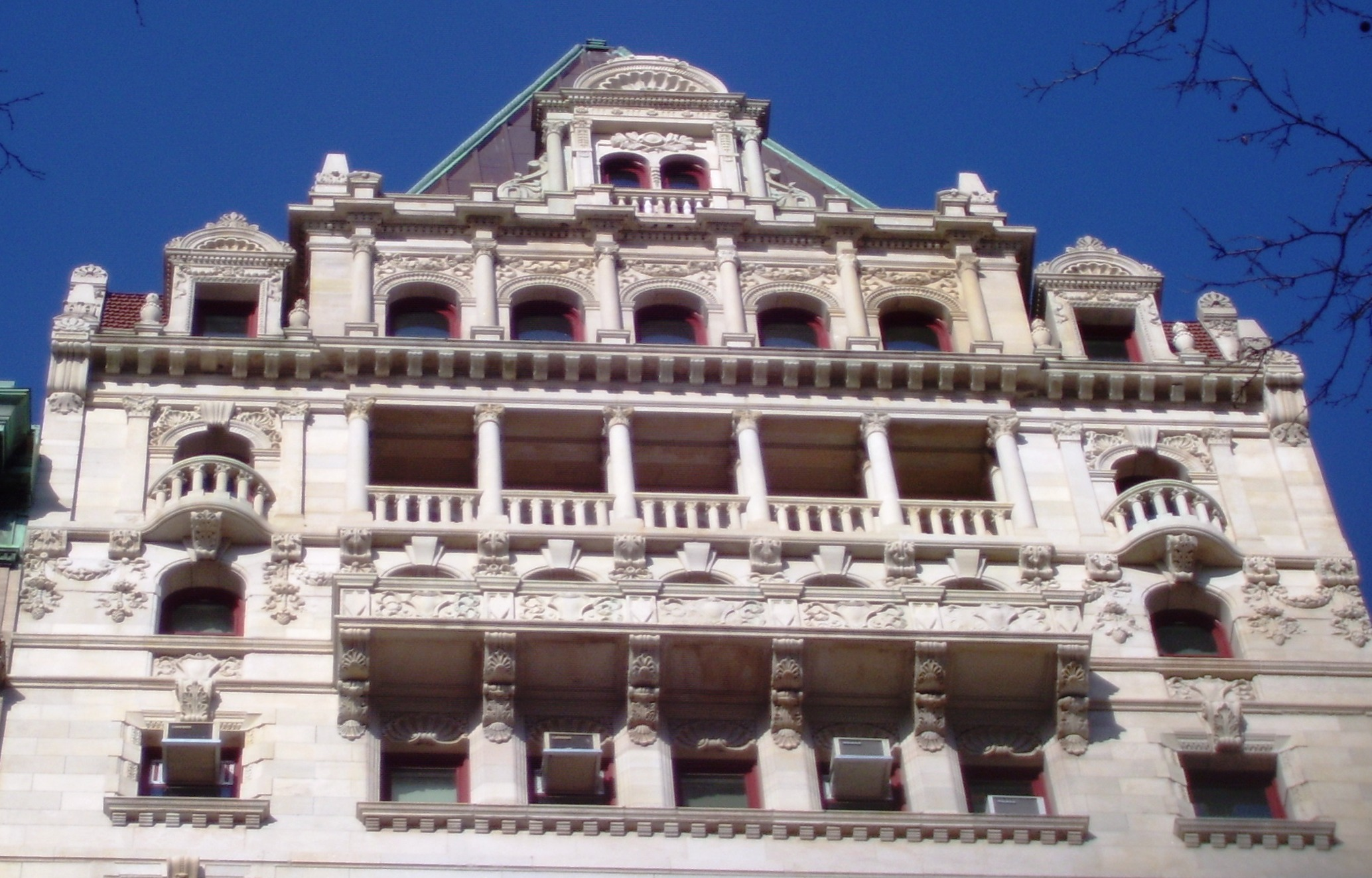
The top of the 16-story steel-framed, marble clad Home Life Insurance Company Building at 256-57 Broadway, built in 1892–94 and designed by Napoleon LeBrun & Sons, Pierre LeBrun, chief architect, in the Renaissance Revival style. The building was one of the tallest in the world at the time it was built.

== Restatement ==
On March 15, 2004, Trust Operations were discontinued in the fourth quarter of 2003. Prior-period results have been restated. On March 11, 2005, the company's fourth-quarter and full-year 2004 net income reflected revised after-tax net gains of $40.4 million and $41.2 million, respectively, related to Phoenix's 16.5 percent equity stake in Aberdeen.
