= List of University of Miami School of Law alumni =

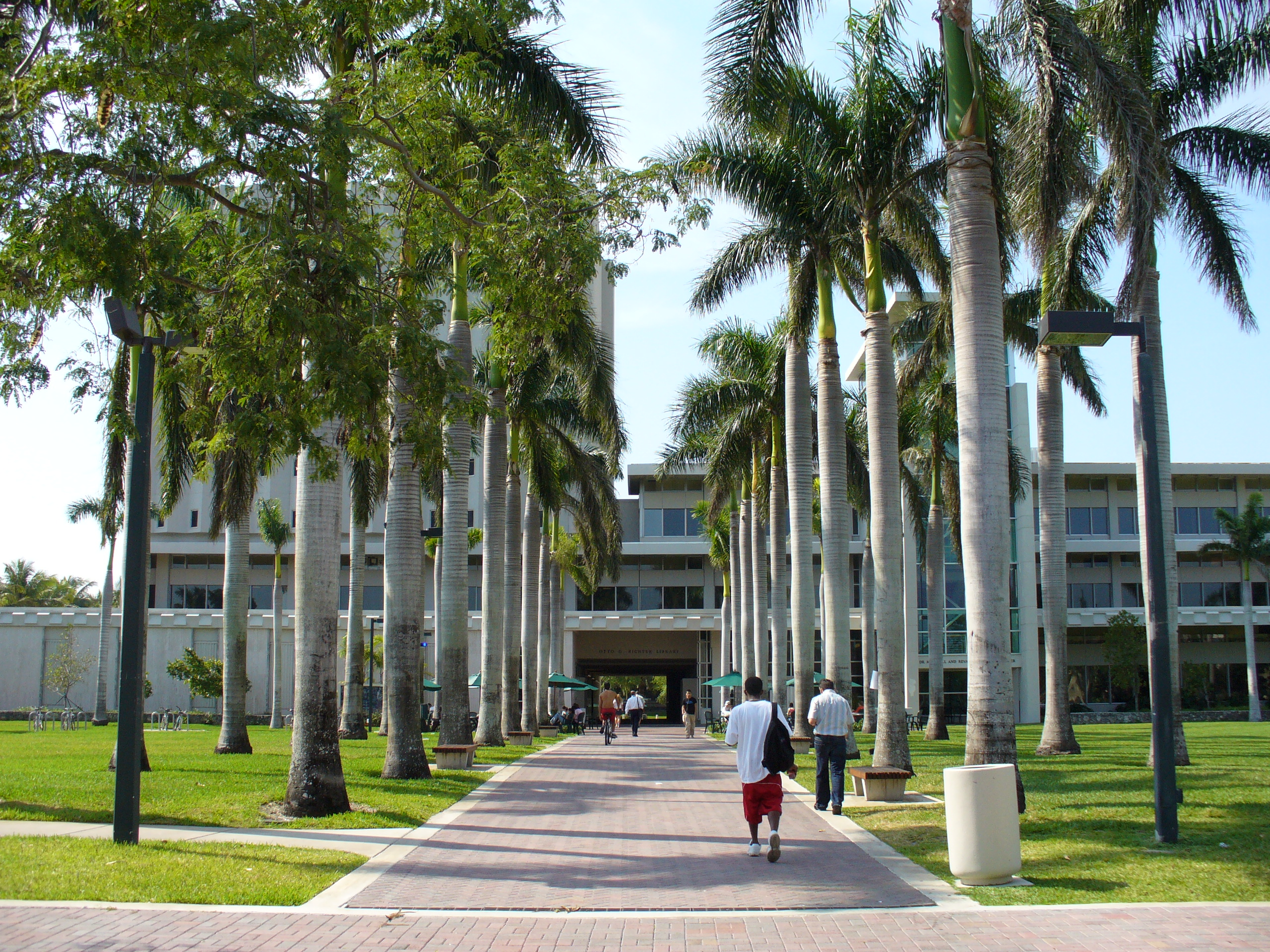
The University of Miami campus in Coral Gables, Florida in 2006

This is a list of notable alumni of the University of Miami School of Law, the law school of the University of Miami, located in Coral Gables, Florida.

== Business ==
- James J. Greco (J.D. 1983), former president and CEO, Sbarro
- Lisa Song Sutton, businesswoman, real estate investor, attorney, former Miss Nevada United States, and former congressional candidate

== Government and politics ==
=== Federal officials ===
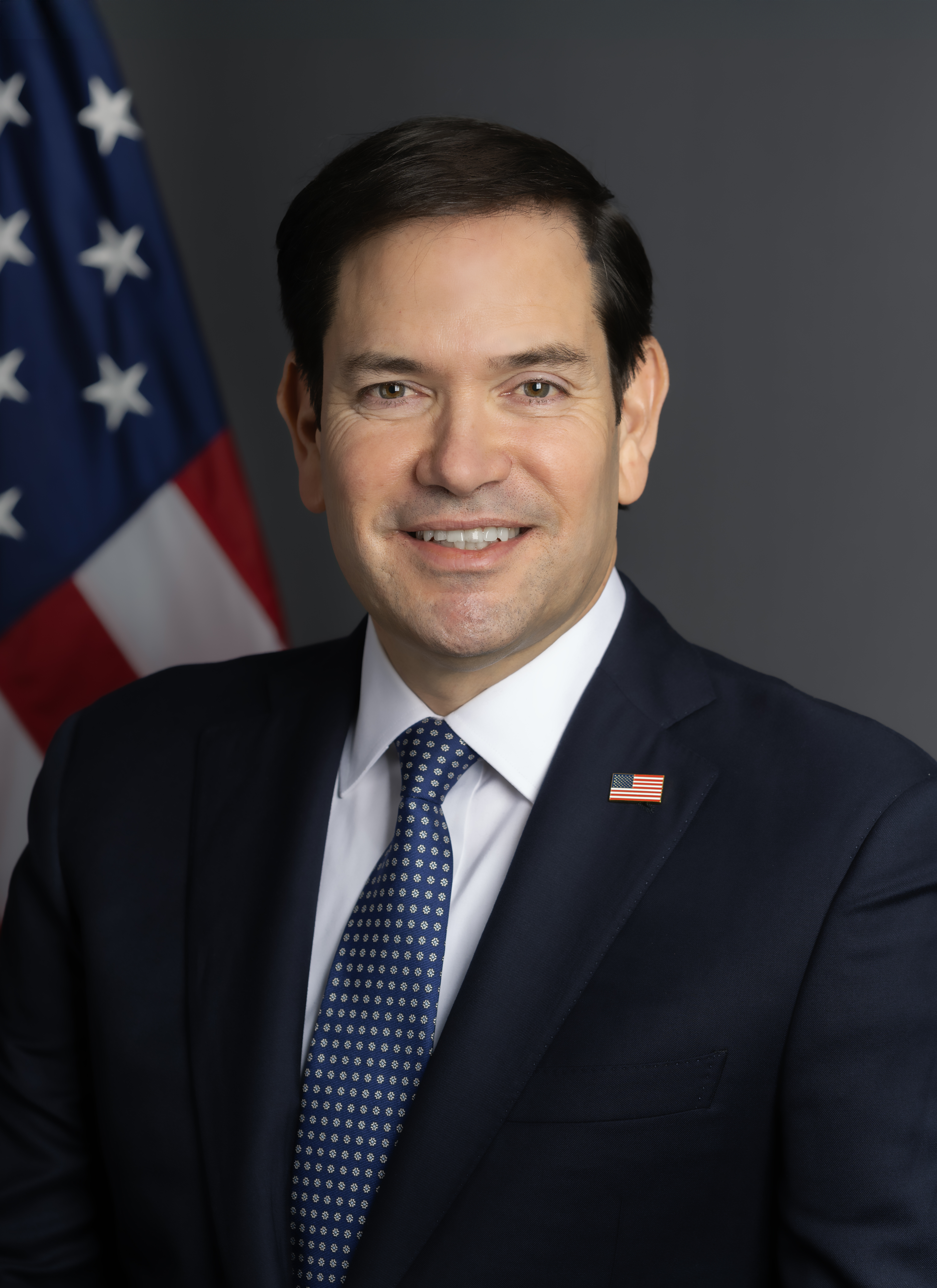
Marco Rubio

- Sue McCourt Cobb (J.D. 1972), former U.S. ambassador to Jamaica and former Florida secretary of state
- Charles D. Michel (J.D. 1992), 30th vice commandant of the United States Coast Guard, first career judge advocate in any of the Armed Forces to achieve four-star rank
- Reince Priebus (J.D. 1998), 27th White House chief of staff, former chairman of the Republican National Committee
- Marco Rubio (J.D. 1996), 72nd United States secretary of state (2025–present), United States senator (2011–2025)
- Gregg Wenzel (J.D. 1994), former Central Intelligence Agency operative

=== Members of U.S. Congress ===
- Pat Cannon (LL.B. 1931), United States representative (1939–1947)
- Dante Fascell (LL.B. 1938), United States representative (1955–1993), chair of the House Foreign Affairs Committee (1983–1993)
- Joe Garcia (J.D. 1991), United States representative (2013–2015)
- Tom Rooney (J.D. 1998), United States representative (2009–2019)

=== State and local administration ===
- Manny Diaz (J.D. 1980), former mayor of the City of Miami
- Daryl Jones (J.D. 1987), former member, Florida Senate, Florida House of Representatives
- Alex Penelas (J.D. 1985), former mayor of Dade County, Florida
- Maria Sachs (J.D. 1978), former member, Florida Senate, Florida House of Representatives

=== Local officials ===
- Victor De Yurre (ML), former member of the Miami City Commission

=== Foreign officials ===
- Dean Barrow (LL.M. 1981), former prime minister of Belize (2008–2020)

== Judiciary ==
=== Federal courts ===
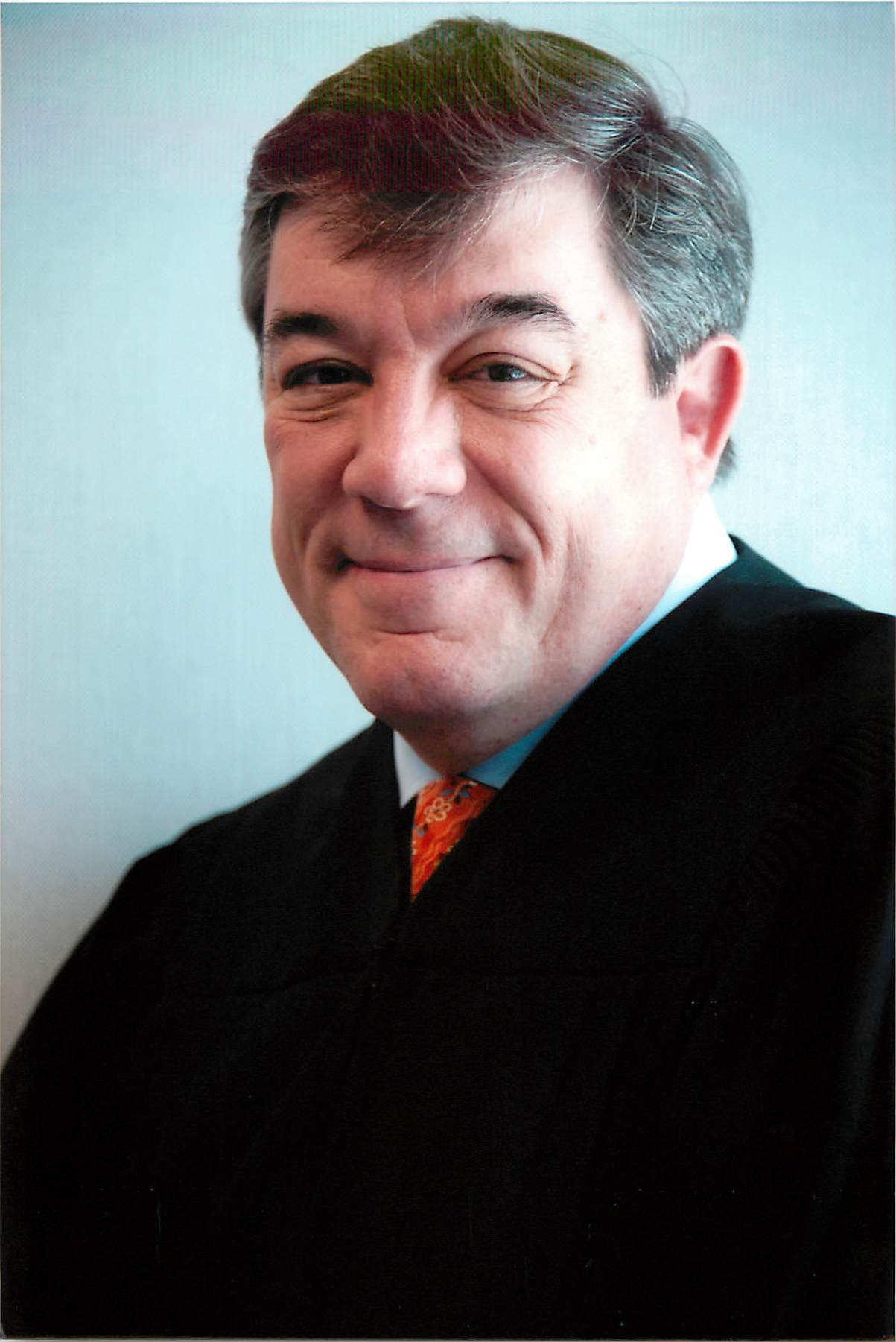
Adalberto Jordan

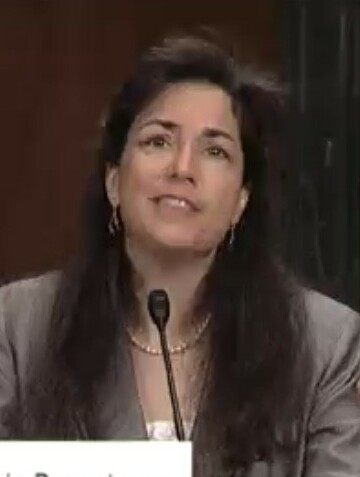
Robin Rosenbaum

- Tamara W. Ashford (LL.M.), United States Tax Court judge
- Beth F. Bloom (J.D. 1988), United States District Court judge
- Ted Cabot (LL.B. 1953), United States District Court judge
- A. Jay Cristol (J.D. 1959), U.S. Bankruptcy Court for the Southern District of Florida chief judge emeritus
- Melissa Damian (J.D. 1995), United States District Court judge
- Alan Stephen Gold (LL.M. 1974), United States District Court judge
- John A. Houston (J.D. 1977), United States District Court judge
- Paul G. Hyman Jr. (J.D. 1977), United States Bankruptcy Court judge
- Adalberto Jordan (J.D. 1987), judge of the United States Court of Appeals for the Eleventh Circuit
- Jose E. Martinez (J.D. 1965), United States District Court judge
- Federico A. Moreno (J.D. 1978), chief United States District Court judge
- Lenore Carrero Nesbitt (LL.B. 1957), United States District Court judge
- Robin S. Rosenbaum (J.D. 1991), United States Circuit Court judge for the Eleventh Circuit Court of Appeals
- Kenneth Ryskamp (J.D. 1956), United States District Court judge
- Thomas E. Scott, Jr. (J.D. 1972), United States District Court judge
- Kathleen M. Williams (J.D. 1982), United States District Court judge

=== State courts ===
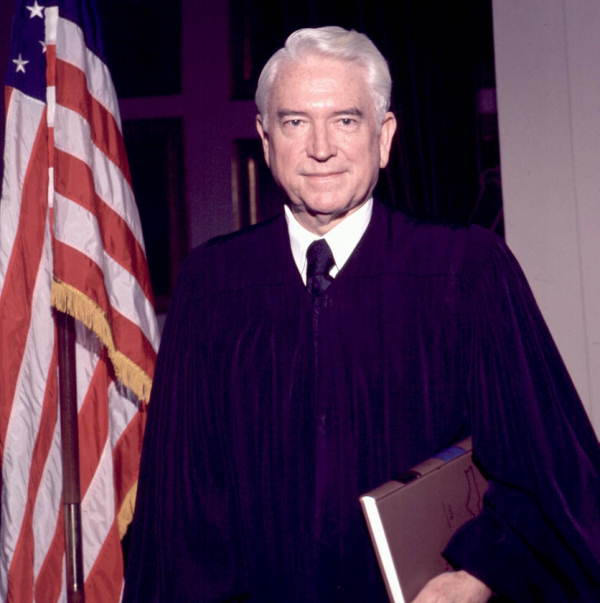
Joseph A. Boyd Jr.

- Joseph A. Boyd Jr. (LL.B. 1948), Florida Supreme Court justice 1969–1987, chief justice 1984–1986
- Gerald Kogan (LL.B. 1955), Florida Supreme Court justice 1987–1998, chief justice 1986–1988
- R. Fred Lewis (J.D. 1972), chief justice, Florida Supreme Court (1998–present)
- Ed Newman (J.D. 1987), National Football League All-Pro football player, and county court judge in Miami, Florida
- Ian Richards (J.D. 2002), county court judge of Florida's 17th Judicial Circuit

=== Non-United States courts ===
- Doris König (M.C.L. 1982), vice president, Federal Constitutional Court of Germany

== Private practice ==
- Roy Black (J.D. 1967), criminal defense attorney
- Nancy Chemtob (J.D. 1990), founder, Chemtob, Moss, Forman & Beyda
- Lindsey Halligan (2013), insurance lawyer and lawyer for Donald Trump
- Reince Priebus (J.D. 1998), 27th White House chief of staff, president and chief strategist for Michael Best and Friedrich LLP
- Robert H. Traurig (J.D. 1950), founder, Greenberg Traurig, LLP

== Sports ==
- Ed Lynch (J.D. 1991), professional baseball player, coach and executive
- Ken Pavia, former sports agent, founder of MMAagents Sports Agency, and the former CEO of India's first MMA Super Fight League
- Ed Rubinoff (born 1935), tennis player
- Marc Trestman (J.D. 1983), former University of Miami football assistant coach, former head coach of the Chicago Bears of the National Football League

== Other ==
- Henry N. Butler (1982), dean of George Mason University's Antonin Scalia School of Law
- Xavier Cortada (J.D. 1991), artist
- Patricia Ireland (J.D. 1975), former president of the National Organization for Women
- Carolyn Lamm, former president of the American Bar Association
- Larry R. Leiby (J.D. 1973), commercial arbitrator
- Paul Levine (J.D. 1973), novelist, author of legal thrillers
- Barbara Parker (J.D.), mystery writer
- Ana Maria Polo (1987), television arbitrator on Caso Cerrado
- Thane Rosenbaum (born 1960), writer and law professor
