= Gore v. Harris =

Lawsuit pertaining to the 2000 US Election

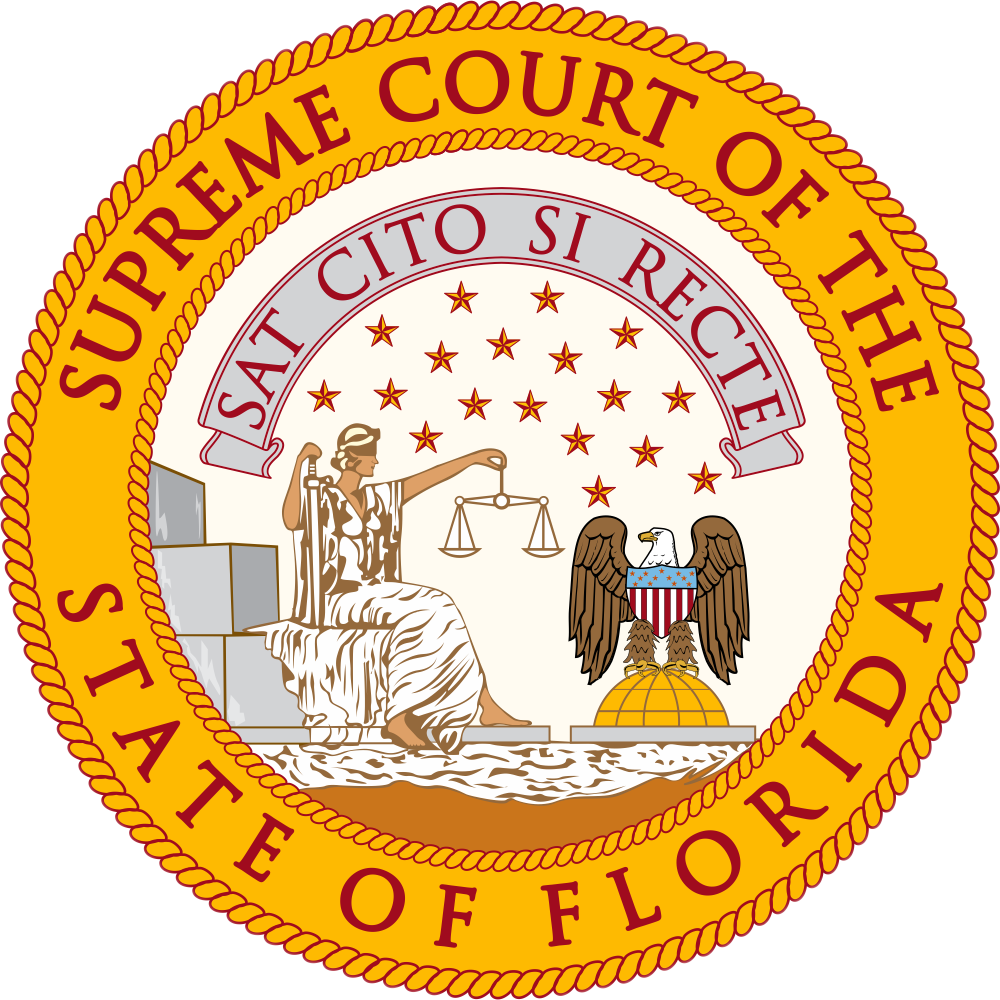
- Court: Supreme Court of Florida
- Full case name: Albert Gore, Jr., et al. v. Katherine Harris, as Secretary of State, State of Florida, et al. 2000
- Decided: December 8, 2000

Case history
- Prior action: Appeal from the Circuit Court of Leon County (Judge N. Sanders Sauls ruling against Gore's contest of the election certification)
- Subsequent actions: Stayed by the Supreme Court of the United States on December 9, 2000; reversed and remanded by Bush v. Gore on December 12, 2000

Holding
- Reversals of the trial court; ordered a manual recount of all "undervotes" in all Florida counties where such recounts had not yet occurred, and ordered that 215 votes from Palm Beach County and 168 votes from Miami-Dade County be added to Gore's total.

Court membership
- Judges sitting: Major B. Harding, Harry Lee Anstead, Barbara J. Pariente, R. Fred Lewis, Peggy A. Quince, Leander J. Shaw Jr.
- Chief judge: Charles T. Wells

Case opinions
- Decision by: Per curiam (with Barbara J. Pariente concurring; Charles T. Wells, Major B. Harding, and Leander J. Shaw Jr. dissenting)

Gore v. Harris was a case decided by the Supreme Court of Florida. The court ordered a manual recount of votes during the 2000 United States presidential election. Decided on December 8, 2000 by a narrow 4-3 margin, the state Supreme Court reversed a lower court ruling from the Circuit Court of Leon County.

The decision was stayed the following day by the Supreme Court of the United States, which ultimately reversed and remanded the ruling on December 12, 2000, in the historic case Bush v. Gore, effectively ending the recount and securing the presidency for George W. Bush.

== Background and Trial Court Action ==
Following the thin margin of victory for Republican candidate George W. Bush on election night, automatic machine recounts and subsequent selective manual recounts in key counties significantly narrowed Bush's lead. On November 26, 2000, Florida Secretary of State Katherine Harris certified Bush as the winner of Florida's 25 electoral votes by a margin of 537 votes.

The following day, Democratic nominee and Vice President Al Gore filed a formal contest in the Leon County Circuit Court under Section 102.168 of the Florida Statutes. Gore challenged three primary elements of the certification.

- The refusal of the Miami-Dade County Canvassing Board to complete a manual recount of its 9,000 undervotes.
- The Palm Beach County Canvassing Board's rejection of approximately 3,300 ballots during its manual recount.
- Nassau County's decision to certify its original election night returns rather than its machine recount tabulation, which cost Gore a net 51 votes.

Following a two-day evidentiary hearing, Leon County Circuit Court Judge N. Sanders Sauls ruled entirely against Gore on December 4, 2000. Sauls concluded that Gore had failed to show a "reasonable probability" that the recount would change the outcome of the election. Gore immediately appealed the decision, and the First District Court of Appeal certified the case directly to the Florida Supreme Court as a matter of great public importance.

== Florida Supreme Court Decision ==
On December 8, 2000, the Florida Supreme Court issued a 4-3 per curiam opinion reversing Saul's ruling in part. The majority consisted of Justices Harry Lee Anstead, Barbara J. Pariente, R. Fred Lewis, and Peggy A. Quince. Chief Justice Charles T. Wells wrote a dissent joined by Justices Major B. Harding and Leander J. Shaw Jr.

== Subsequent Developments and Legacy ==
The statewide recount ordered by Gore v. Harris began on the morning of Saturday, December 9, 2000. However, the process was short-lived. Later that afternoon, the Supreme Court of the United States granted a stay requested by George W. Bush, halting the recount nationwide.

On December 12, 2000, the U.S. Supreme Court issued its ruling in Bush v. Gore. By a 7–2 vote, the Court held that the Florida Supreme Court's recount order violated the Equal Protection Clause of the Fourteenth Amendment because different counties (and even different tables within counties) were using wildly divergent standards to determine voter intent. By a 5–4 vote, the Court ruled that no constitutional recount could be completed before the federal "safe harbor" deadline of December 12, effectively ending Al Gore’s legal challenges and delivering Florida’s electoral votes to Bush.
