= Bush v. Gore =

2000 U.S. Supreme Court case

- Supreme Court of the United States

Argued December 11, 2000 Decided December 12, 2000
- Full case name: George W. Bush and Richard Cheney, Petitioners v. Albert Gore, Jr. and Joseph Lieberman, et al.
- Docket no.: 00-949
- Citations: 531 U.S. 98 (more) 121 S. Ct. 525; 148 L. Ed. 2d 388; 2000 U.S. LEXIS 8430; 69 U.S.L.W. 4029; 2000 Cal. Daily Op. Service 9879; 2000 Colo. J. C.A.R. 6606; 14 Fla. L. Weekly Fed. S 25
- Argument: Oral argument
- Decision: Opinion

Case history
- Prior: Judgment for defendant, Fla. Cir. Ct.; matter certified to Florida Supreme Court, Fla. Ct. App.; aff'd in part, rev'd in part, sub nom. Palm Beach County Canvassing Bd. v. Harris, 772 So. 2d 1273 (2000); cert. granted, stay granted, 531 U.S. 1036 (2000).

Holding
- In the circumstances of this case, any manual recount of votes seeking to meet the December 12 "safe harbor" deadline would be unconstitutional under the Equal Protection Clause of the Fourteenth Amendment.

Court membership
- Chief Justice William Rehnquist Associate Justices John P. Stevens · Sandra Day O'Connor; Antonin Scalia · Anthony Kennedy; David Souter · Clarence Thomas; Ruth Bader Ginsburg · Stephen Breyer

Case opinions
- Per curiam
- Concurrence: Rehnquist, joined by Scalia, Thomas
- Dissent: Stevens, joined by Ginsburg, Breyer
- Dissent: Souter, joined by Breyer; Stevens, Ginsburg (all but Part III)
- Dissent: Ginsburg, joined by Stevens; Souter, Breyer (Part I)
- Dissent: Breyer, joined by Stevens, Ginsburg (except Part I–A–1); Souter (Part I)

Laws applied
- U.S. Const. art. II, § 1, cl. 2, amend. XIV; 3 U.S.C. § 5

Bush v. Gore, 531 U.S. 98 (2000), is a landmark decision of the United States Supreme Court on December 12, 2000, that settled a recount dispute in Florida's 2000 presidential election between George W. Bush and Al Gore. On December 8, 2000, the Florida Supreme Court ordered a statewide recount of all undervotes, over 61,000 ballots that the vote tabulation machines had missed. The Bush campaign immediately asked the U.S. Supreme Court to stay the decision and halt the recount. On December 9, the U.S. Supreme Court granted certiorari and issued the stay. The case was argued before the Court on December 11. On December 12 the Court held, in a 5–4 per curiam decision, that no constitutional recount could be conducted in the remaining time, which was short because the Florida legislature wanted to take advantage of the federal "safe harbor" for its electors to be free from challenge.

The Court held that the recount violated the Equal Protection Clause of the U.S. Constitution's Fourteenth Amendment and must end. Seven justices expressed the view that the recount procedures suffered from constitutionally significant equal protection defects requiring correction. In dissent, two of the seven wrote that the matter should be remanded for a constitutionally proper recount. Specifically, the Court held that the Equal Protection Clause was violated by Florida's counties' varying standards for discerning voter intent. The case had also been argued on Article II jurisdictional grounds, which found favor with only three justices.

The majority held that no alternative method could be established within the discretionary December 12 "safe harbor" deadline set by Title 3 of the United States Code (3 U.S.C.), § 5, which the Florida Supreme Court had said the Florida Legislature intended to meet. The Court, holding that not meeting the "safe harbor" deadline would violate the Florida Election Code, rejected an extension of the deadline Justices Stephen Breyer and David Souter proposed to allow Florida to complete the recount using a uniform statewide standard. That deadline arrived two hours after the release of the Court's decision.

The Supreme Court's decision in Bush v. Gore was among the most controversial in U.S. history, as it allowed Florida secretary of state (and co-chair of Bush's Florida campaign) Katherine Harris's vote certification to stand, giving Bush Florida's 25 electoral votes. Those votes gave Bush, the Republican nominee, 271 electoral votes, one more than the 270 required to win the Electoral College. This meant the defeat of Democratic nominee Al Gore, who received 266 electoral votes. (Note: Gore won 267 electoral votes but received 266, as a "faithless elector" from the District of Columbia abstained from voting.) Media organizations later analyzed the ballots and found that, under specified criteria, the original limited recount of undervotes in several large counties would have resulted in a Bush victory, but according to the Florida Ballot Project, a statewide recount would have shown that Gore received the most votes. Florida later retired the punch-card voting machines that produced the ballots disputed in the case.

== Background ==
In the United States, each state conducts its own popular vote election for president and vice president. The voters are actually voting for a slate of electors, each of whom pledges to vote for a particular candidate for each office in the Electoral College. Article II, § 1, cl. 2 of the U.S. Constitution provides that each state legislature decides how electors are chosen. Referring to an earlier Supreme Court case, McPherson v. Blacker, the Court noted that early in U.S. history, most state legislatures directly appointed their slates of electors.

State legislatures later enacted laws to provide for the selection of electors by popular vote within each state. While these laws vary, most states, including Florida, award all electoral votes to the candidate for either office who receives a plurality of the state's popular vote. Any candidate who receives an absolute majority of all electoral votes nationally (270 since 1963) wins the presidential or vice-presidential election.

On November 8, 2000, the Florida Division of Elections reported that Bush won with 48.8% of the vote in Florida, a margin of victory of 1,784 votes. The margin of victory was less than 0.5% of the votes cast, so a statutorily mandated automatic machine recount occurred. On November 10, with the machine recount apparently finished in all but one county, Bush's margin of victory had decreased to 327 votes.

According to legal analyst Jeffrey Toobin, later analysis showed that 18 counties—accounting for a quarter of all votes cast in Florida—did not carry out the legally mandated machine recount, but "No one from the Gore campaign ever challenged this view" that the machine recount had been completed. Florida's election laws allow a candidate to request a county to conduct a manual recount, and Gore requested manual recounts in four Florida counties—Volusia, Palm Beach, Broward, and Miami-Dade—that generally vote Democratic and would be expected to find more votes for Gore. Gore did not request any recounts in counties that generally vote Republican. The four counties granted the request and began manual recounts. Florida law also required all counties to certify their election returns to the Florida secretary of state within seven days of the election, and several of the counties conducting manual recounts did not believe they could meet this deadline.

On November 14, the statutory deadline, the Florida Circuit Court ruled that the seven-day deadline was mandatory but that the counties could amend their returns at a later date. The court also ruled that the secretary of state, after "considering all attendant facts and circumstances", had discretion to include any late amended returns in the statewide certification. Before the 5 p.m. deadline on November 14, Volusia County completed its manual recount and certified its results. At 5 p.m. on November 14, Florida secretary of state Katherine Harris announced that she had received the certified returns from all 67 counties, while Palm Beach, Broward, and Miami-Dade Counties were still conducting manual recounts.

Harris issued a set of criteria by which she would determine whether to allow late filings, and she required any county seeking to make a late filing to submit to her, by 2 p.m. the following day, a written statement of the facts and circumstances justifying the late filing. Four counties, including the three that missed the deadline, submitted statements, and after reviewing the submissions, Harris determined that none justified an extension of the deadline. She further announced that after she received the certified returns of the overseas absentee ballots from each county, she would certify the results of the presidential election on November 18. On November 17, the Florida Supreme Court enjoined Harris from certifying the election while it heard appeals from the various cases in progress. On November 21, it allowed continuation of the manual recounts and delayed certification until November 26.

== Stay of the Florida recount ==
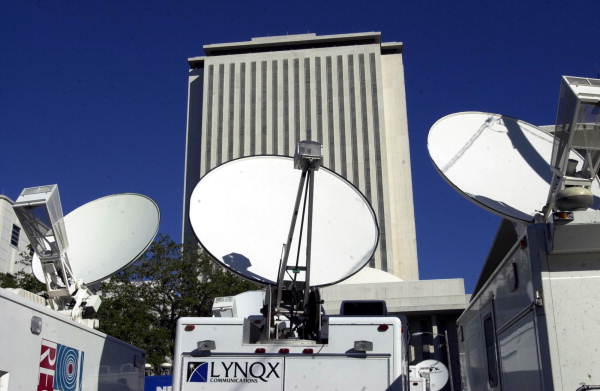
Close-up view of satellite trucks parked by the Florida State Capitol during the 2000 presidential election vote dispute

By December 8, 2000, there had been multiple court decisions about the presidential election in Florida. On that date, the Florida Supreme Court, by a 4–3 vote, ordered a statewide manual recount of undervotes. Bush then filed an emergency request to the U.S. Supreme Court asking to stay the recount. Justice Antonin Scalia, contending that all the manual recounts being performed in Florida's counties were illegitimate, urged his colleagues to grant the stay immediately. On December 9, 2000, the five conservative justices on the Court granted the stay, with Scalia citing "irreparable harm" that could befall Bush, as the recounts would cast "a needless and unjustified cloud" over the legitimacy of Bush's election. In dissent, Justice John Paul Stevens wrote, "counting every legally cast vote cannot constitute irreparable harm." Oral arguments were scheduled for December 11, 2000. The Court also treated Bush's application for relief as a petition for a writ of certiorari, granted that petition, requested briefing from the parties by 4 p.m. on December 10, and scheduled oral argument for the morning of December 11.

Although opinions are rarely issued in connection with grants of certiorari (a minimum of four of the nine justices must vote in favor of the grant), Scalia filed an opinion concurring in the Court's decision, writing that "a brief response is necessary to [Stevens's] dissent". According to Scalia,

It suffices to say that the issuance of the stay suggests that a majority of the Court, while not deciding the issues presented, believe that the petitioner has a substantial probability of success. The issue is not, as the dissent puts it, whether "counting every legally cast vote can constitute irreparable harm." One of the principal issues in the appeal we have accepted is precisely whether the votes that have been ordered to be counted are, under a reasonable interpretation of Florida law, "legally cast vote[s]." The counting of votes that are of questionable legality does in my view threaten irreparable harm to petitioner Bush, and to the country, by casting a cloud upon what he claims to be the legitimacy of his election. Count first, and rule upon legality afterwards, is not a recipe for producing election results that have the public acceptance democratic stability requires.

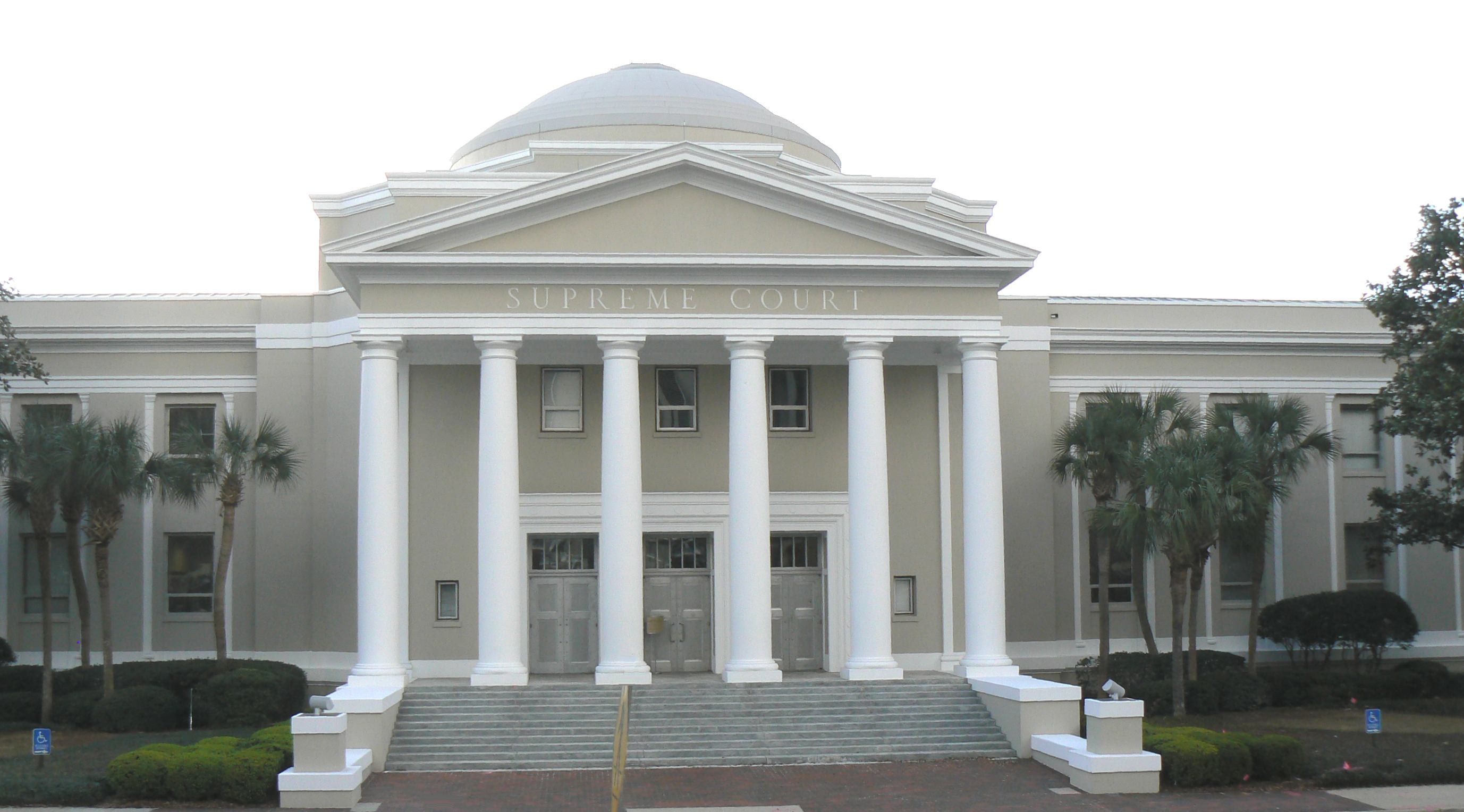
Florida Supreme Court

Stevens's dissenting opinion was joined by Justices Souter, Ginsburg, and Breyer. According to Stevens,

To stop the counting of legal votes, the majority today departs from three venerable rules of judicial restraint that have guided the Court throughout its history. On questions of state law, we have consistently respected the opinions of the highest courts of the States. On questions whose resolution is committed at least in large measure to another branch of the Federal Government, we have construed our own jurisdiction narrowly and exercised it cautiously. On federal constitutional questions that were not fairly presented to the court whose judgment is being reviewed, we have prudently declined to express an opinion. The majority has acted unwisely. … [A] stay should not be granted unless an applicant makes a substantial showing of a likelihood of irreparable harm. In this case, petitioners have failed to carry that heavy burden. Counting every legally cast vote cannot constitute irreparable harm. On the other hand, there is a danger that a stay may cause irreparable harm to respondents–and, more importantly, the public at large … . Preventing the recount from being completed will inevitably cast a cloud on the legitimacy of the election.

Several legal scholars have agreed with the dissenters' argument that Bush failed to carry the "heavy burden" of demonstrating a "likelihood of irreparable harm".

== Rapid developments ==
The oral argument in Bush v. Gore occurred on December 11. Theodore Olson, a Washington, D.C., lawyer, delivered Bush's oral argument. Joseph Klock, a Florida-based attorney, represented Katherine Harris. New York lawyer David Boies argued for Gore. During the U.S. Supreme Court's brief deliberation on Bush v. Gore, the Florida Supreme Court provided clarifications of its November 21 decision in Palm Beach County Canvassing Board v. Harris (Harris I), which the U.S. Supreme Court had requested on December 4 after arguments in the case of Bush v. Palm Beach County Canvassing Board. Because of the case's extraordinary nature and urgency, the U.S. Supreme Court issued its opinion in Bush v. Gore on December 12, a day after hearing oral argument.

== Relevant law ==
The Equal Protection Clause of the Fourteenth Amendment is the U.S. constitutional provision on which the decision in Bush v. Gore was based. Article II, § 1, cl. 2 of the Constitution specifies the number of electors per state, and, most relevant to this case, the manner in which those electors are selected, stipulating:

Each State shall appoint, in such Manner as the Legislature thereof may direct, a Number of Electors ...

This clause arguably gives power to only one branch of Florida's state government: the state legislature.

Section 2 of the Electoral Count Act, now codified in 3 U.S.C. § 5, regulates the "determination of controversy as to appointment of electors" in presidential elections. Of particular relevance to this case was the so-called "safe harbor" provision, which assures Congress's deference to states in their appointments of electors if done by a specified deadline:

If any State shall have provided ... for its final determination of ... the appointment of all or any of the electors of such State ... at least six days before the time fixed for the meeting of the electors, such determination ... shall be conclusive.

Since the electors were set to meet December 18, the discretional "safe harbor" deadline was December 12, just one day after the Court heard oral arguments in this case. According to 28 U.S.C. § 1257:

Final judgments or decrees rendered by the highest court of a State in which a decision could be had, may be reviewed by the Supreme Court by writ of certiorari where the validity of a treaty or statute of the United States is drawn in question or where the validity of a statute of any State is drawn in question on the ground of its being repugnant to the Constitution, treaties, or laws of the United States ...

== Issues considered by the Court ==
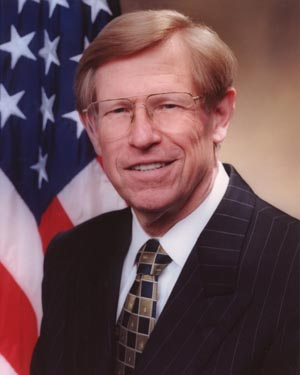
Theodore Olson represented Bush.

The Court had to resolve two different questions to fully resolve the case:

- Were the recounts, as they were being conducted, constitutional?
- If the recounts were unconstitutional, what was the appropriate remedy?

Three days earlier, the five-Justice majority had ordered the recount stopped, and the Court had to decide whether to restart it.

=== Equal Protection Clause ===
Bush argued that recounts in Florida violated the Equal Protection Clause because Florida did not have a statewide vote recount standard. Each county determined on its own whether a given ballot was valid. Two voters in different counties could have marked their ballots in an identical manner, but the ballot in one county would be counted while the ballot in the other county would be rejected, because of the conflicting manual recount standards.

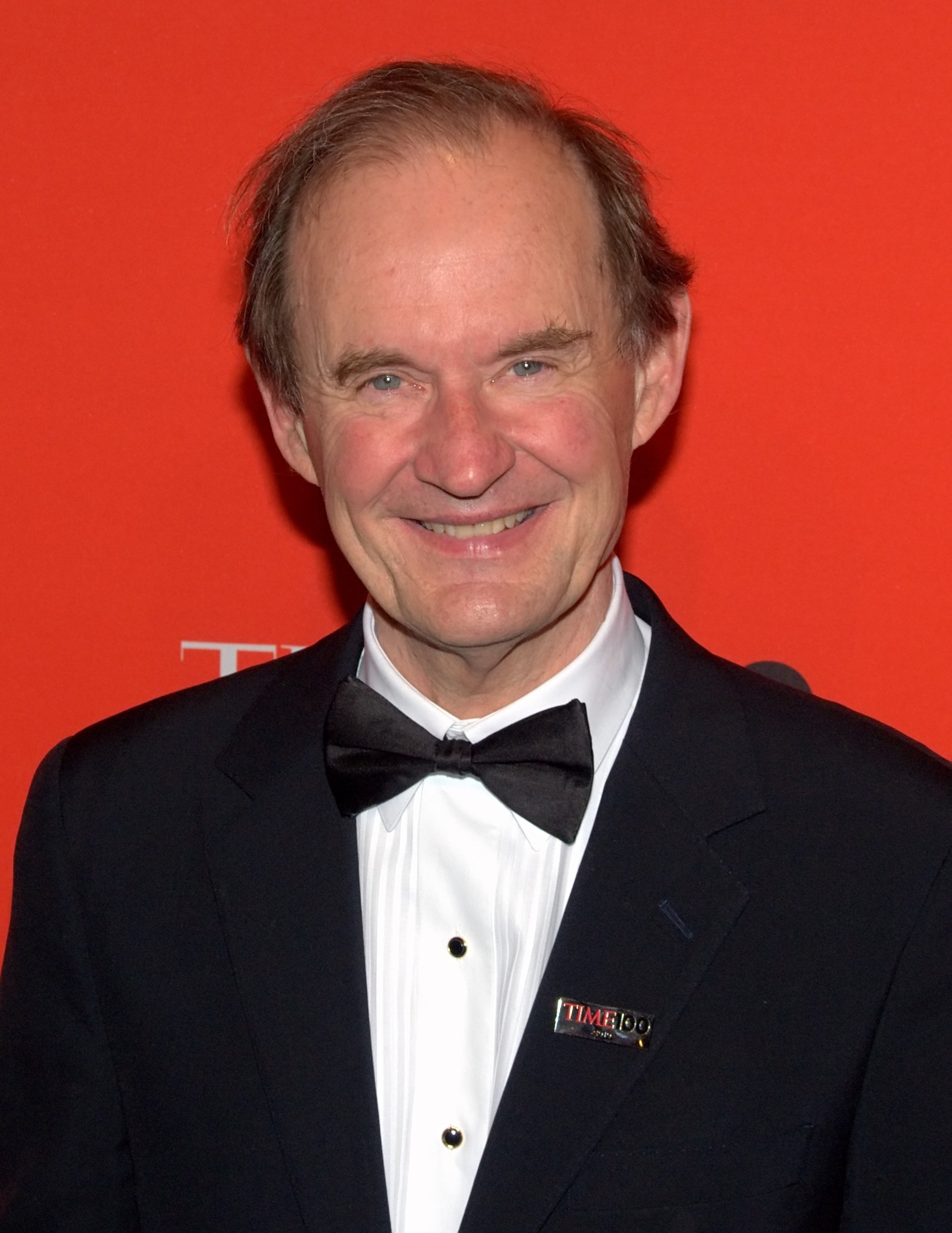
David Boies represented Gore.

Gore argued that there was indeed a statewide standard, the "intent of the voter" standard, and that this standard was sufficient under the Equal Protection Clause. Furthermore, he argued that the consequence of ruling the Florida recount unconstitutional simply because it treated different voters differently would effectively render every state's election unconstitutional and that each voting mechanism has a different rate of error in counting votes. Voters in a "punch-card" county were more likely to have their votes undercounted than voters in an "optical scanner" county. If Bush prevailed, Gore argued, every state would have to have one statewide method of recording votes to be constitutional. This was the most closely decided issue in the case. The arguments presented by counsel did not extensively address what the Court should do if the Court found an equal protection violation, but Gore did argue briefly that the appropriate remedy would not be to cancel all recounts, but rather to order a proper recount.

=== Article II ===
Bush argued that the Florida Supreme Court's ruling violated Article II, § 1, cl. 2 of the U.S. Constitution. Essentially, he contended that the Florida Supreme Court's interpretation of Florida law was so erroneous that its ruling had the effect of making new law. Since this "new law" had not been enacted by the Florida legislature, it violated Article II. According to Bush, Article II gives the federal judiciary the power to interpret state election law in presidential elections to ensure that the intent of the state legislature is followed. Gore argued that Article II presupposes judicial review and interpretation of state statutes, and that the Florida Supreme Court did nothing more than exercise the routine principles of statutory construction to reach its decision.

== Decision ==
In brief, the breakdown of the decision was:

- Five justices agreed that there was an Equal Protection Clause violation in using differing standards of determining a valid vote in different counties, causing an "unequal evaluation of ballots in various respects". The per curiam opinion (representing the views of Justices Kennedy, O'Connor, Rehnquist, Scalia, and Thomas) specifically cited that:
  - Palm Beach County changed standards for counting dimpled chads several times during the counting process;
  - Broward County used less restrictive standards than Palm Beach County;
  - Miami-Dade County's recount of rejected ballots did not include all precincts;
  - The Florida Supreme Court did not specify who would recount the ballots.
- The per curiam opinion also identified an inconsistency with the fact that the Florida statewide recount of rejected ballots was limited to undervotes. The opinion implied that a constitutionally valid recount would include Florida's overvotes, not just its undervotes. The opinion expressed concern that the limited scope of Florida's recount would mean that, unlike some undervotes found to be reclaimable, valid votes among the overvotes would not be reclaimed. (Note: Unknown at the time, but observed in the later media recounts, there was a significant number of such valid overvotes found among the rejected ballots in optical scan counties, which largely favored Gore.) Furthermore, if a machine had incorrectly read an overvote as a valid vote for one of two marked candidates instead of rejecting it, Florida would wrongly count what should be an invalid vote. (Note: The opinion does not suggest a practical method for searching for and manually identifying such ballots among the thousands of legally cast and counted ballots with which they would be mixed.)
- Breyer and Souter disagreed with the majority, pointing out that Bush presented no evidence in any court of uncounted legal overvotes and did not see any problem in Florida's decision to limit its recount to undervotes. The dissents of Breyer and Souter were full dissents. Unlike the five-justice majority, each identified an equal protection concern that did not rise to the level of a constitutional violation and proposed a remedy different from the majority's remedy. A dissenting opinion does not create precedent, nor does it become a part of case law. Under the American legal system, dissenting court opinions are not considered valid holdings and are not included in the court's ruling. Nothing in Breyer's or Souter's dissents can be construed as part of any decision by the Court.
- In dissenting, Ginsburg wrote that, for better or worse, disparities were a part of all elections and that if an equal-protection argument applied in any way, it surely applied more to black voters.
- Five justices agreed that December 12 (the date of the decision) was the deadline Florida had established for recounts in keeping with 3 U.S.C. §5 (Rehnquist, O'Connor, Scalia, Kennedy, and Thomas in support; Stevens, Souter, Ginsburg, and Breyer opposed). Souter, joined by Breyer, Ginsburg and Stevens, wrote, "But no State is required to conform to §5 if it cannot do that (for whatever reason); the sanction for failing to satisfy the conditions of §5 is simply loss of what has been called its 'safe harbor.' And even that determination is to be made, if made anywhere, in the Congress." Souter and Breyer would have remanded the case to the Florida Supreme Court to permit that court to establish uniform standards of what constituted a legal vote for a manual recount of all rejected ballots using those standards.
- Three justices (Rehnquist, Scalia, and Thomas) argued that the Florida Supreme Court had acted contrary to the intent of the Florida legislature. Four (Stevens, Souter, Ginsburg, and Breyer) specifically disputed this in their dissenting opinions, and the remaining two (O'Connor and Kennedy) declined to join Rehnquist's concurrence on the matter.

=== Equal Protection Clause ===
In its per curiam opinion, the Supreme Court ruled that the Florida Supreme Court decision calling for a statewide recount violated the Equal Protection Clause of the Fourteenth Amendment. Kennedy has since been identified as the opinion's primary author. In addition to writing the opinion, he included Souter, Breyer and Stevens as agreeing that there were equal protection "problems" without consulting them. Stevens demanded his name be removed from the draft opinion, which Kennedy agreed to only after Stevens pulled his name from Breyer's dissent. Breyer also objected in private. The New York Times reported that Kennedy's opinion "later caused some confusion by its reference to 'seven justices of the court' who 'agree that there are constitutional problems with the recount.' That was true, but it was also beside the point." Later interviews by Vanity Fair indicated that Breyer and Souter were trying to appeal to Kennedy to join them on the remedy, rather than agreeing that an equal protection violation had occurred. Jack Balkin, writing in Yale Law Journal, considered this a cheap trick to construct the illusion of a larger majority, likening it to "saying that two doctors agree that a patient is sick, but one wants to use leeches, and the other wants to prescribe antibiotics".

The Court held that the Equal Protection Clause guarantees to individuals that their ballots cannot be devalued by "later arbitrary and disparate treatment". Even if the recount was fair in theory, it was unfair in practice. The record, as weighed by the Florida Supreme Court, suggested that different standards were seemingly applied to the recount from ballot to ballot, precinct to precinct, and county to county, even when identical types of ballots and machines were used.

According to the Court, the statewide standard (that a "legal vote" is "one in which there is a 'clear indication of the intent of the voter'") could not guarantee that each county would count the votes in a constitutionally permissible fashion. The Court stated that the per curiam opinion's applicability was "limited to the present circumstances, for the problem of equal protection in election processes generally presents many complexities." But the Court did not identify those complexities, nor did it explain (or apparently consider) why the absence of a constitutionally acceptable standard for counting votes, which was the basis for the Court's ruling, would not have invalidated the entire presidential election in Florida. Critics later observed that the court had denied certiorari on equal protection grounds when Bush first sought Supreme Court review. Law clerks who worked for Kennedy and O'Connor at the time later said they believed the justices settled on equal protection as grounds for their decision, rather than Article II, because they thought it would seem fairer.

==== Remedy ====
The Court ruled 5–4 that no constitutionally valid recount could be completed by a December 12 "safe harbor" deadline. The Court asserted that "the Supreme Court of Florida has said that the legislature intended the State's electors to 'participat[e] fully in the federal electoral process,' as provided in 3 U.S.C. § 5." The Court therefore effectively ended the proposed recount, because "the Florida Legislature intended to obtain the safe-harbor benefits of 3 U.S.C. §5." Souter said bluntly, "The 3 U.S.C. §5 issue is not serious." Breyer's dissent stated, "By halting the manual recount, and thus ensuring that uncounted legal votes will not be counted under any standard, this Court crafts a remedy out of proportion to the asserted harm. And that remedy harms the very fairness interests the Court is attempting to protect."

Four justices (Stevens, Ginsburg, Souter and Breyer) had dissented from the Court's earlier (December 9) decision, by the same five-justice majority, to grant Bush's emergency request to stop the recount and grant certiorari. In their dissents from the Court's December 12 per curiam opinion, Breyer and Souter acknowledged that the counting up until December 9 had not conformed with equal protection requirements. But Souter and Breyer favored remanding the case to the Florida Supreme Court for the purpose of crafting specific guidelines for how to count disputed ballots, in contrast to the majority's decision to halt the recount altogether. The actual counting had ended with the December 9 ruling, issued three days before any deadline. The dissenting opinions strongly criticized the majority for involving the Court in state-level affairs. Stevens's dissent (joined by Breyer and Ginsburg) concluded as follows:

What must underlie petitioners' entire federal assault on the Florida election procedures is an unstated lack of confidence in the impartiality and capacity of the state judges who would make the critical decisions if the vote count were to proceed. Otherwise, their position is wholly without merit. The endorsement of that position by the majority of this Court can only lend credence to the most cynical appraisal of the work of judges throughout the land. It is confidence in the men and women who administer the judicial system that is the true backbone of the rule of law. Time will one day heal the wound to that confidence that will be inflicted by today's decision. One thing, however, is certain. Although we may never know with complete certainty the identity of the winner of this year's Presidential election, the identity of the loser is perfectly clear. It is the Nation's confidence in the judge as an impartial guardian of the rule of law.

The per curiam opinion did not technically dismiss the case and instead "remanded for further proceedings not inconsistent with this opinion." Gore's attorneys therefore understood that they could fight on and could petition the Florida Supreme Court to repudiate the notion that December 12 was final under Florida law. Despite this, Gore dropped the case—and conceded the election to Bush shortly afterward—reportedly because he was not optimistic about how the Florida justices would react to further arguments and, as one of his advisers put it, "the best Gore could hope for was a slate of disputed electors". In addition, Gore campaign chairman Bill Daley argued that fighting on was futile because even if the Florida Supreme Court defied the U.S. Supreme Court and ordered a new recount, "the GOP would take them straight back to Washington, where the [U.S.] Supreme Court would repeat: 'You ain't going to count, okay? So quit bothering us.'"

On remand, the Florida Supreme Court issued an opinion on December 22 that did not dispute whether December 12 was the deadline for recounts under state law. This was disputed in a concurring opinion by Florida Supreme Court Justice Leander Shaw, who nevertheless expressed deference to the U.S. Supreme Court's view on this issue and also argued that, in any case, the Florida Supreme Court would (in his opinion) be unable to craft a remedy that would satisfy all the U.S. Supreme Court's equal protection, due process, and other concerns.

=== Article II ===
Rehnquist's concurring opinion, joined by Scalia and Thomas, began by emphasizing that this was an unusual case in which the Constitution requires federal courts to assess whether a state supreme court has properly interpreted the will of the state legislature. Usually, federal courts do not make that type of assessment, and indeed the per curiam opinion in this case did not do so. After addressing this aspect of the case, Rehnquist examined and agreed with arguments that the dissenting justices of the Florida Supreme Court had made. Rehnquist also mentioned that he, Scalia, and Thomas joined the Supreme Court's per curiam opinion and agreed with the legal analysis presented there. The ruling also says that "the state legislature's power to select the manner for appointing electors is plenary; it may, if it so chooses, select the electors itself, which indeed was the manner used by state legislatures in several States for many years after the framing of our Constitution. ... The State, of course, after granting the franchise in the special context of Article II, can take back the power to appoint electors."

== Scholarly analyses ==
Bush v. Gore prompted many strong reactions from scholars, pundits and others, with a majority of publications in law reviews being critical. A Georgetown Law Journal analysis found that 78 scholarly articles were published about the case between 2001 and 2004, with 35 criticizing the decision and 11 defending it.

=== Critical remedial issue ===
The most closely decided aspect of the case was the key question of what remedy the Court should order, in view of an Equal Protection Clause violation. Gore had argued for a new recount that would pass constitutional muster, but the Court instead chose to end the election. Citing two Florida Supreme Court opinions, Gore v. Harris (December 8) and Palm Beach County Canvassing Board v. Harris (November 21, footnote 55), the U.S. Supreme Court asserted that "the Florida Supreme Court has said that the Florida Legislature intended to obtain the safe-harbor benefits of 3 U.S.C. § 5" and that "any recount seeking to meet the December 12 date will be unconstitutional". This assertion has proven very controversial.

Finding that reasoning unpersuasive, Michael W. McConnell writes that the two Florida court opinions the Supreme Court cited supply no authoritative pronouncement of an absolute deadline. As better support for December 12 as the deadline under state law, McConnell points to two footnotes in the Florida Supreme Court's December 11 response on remand in Palm Beach County Canvassing Board v. Harris (Harris I), which he says must not have come to the justices' attention. Footnotes 17 and 22 called the safe harbor date of December 12 an "outside deadline". Therefore, he writes, although these passages may not justify the U.S. Supreme Court's decision, since the Court did not rely on them, "the Court may have reached the right result for the wrong reason". These footnotes state:

[17] What is a reasonable time required for completion will, in part, depend on whether the election is for a statewide office, for a federal office or for presidential electors. In the case of the presidential election, the determination of reasonableness must be circumscribed by the provisions of 3 U.S.C. § 5, which sets December 12, 2000, as the date for final determination of any state's dispute concerning its electors for that determination to be given conclusive effect in Congress ...
[22] As always, it is necessary to read all provisions of the elections code in pari materia. In this case, that comprehensive reading required that there be time for an elections contest pursuant to section 102.168, which all parties had agreed was a necessary component of the statutory scheme and to accommodate the outside deadline set forth in 3 U.S.C. § 5 of December 12, 2000.

According to Nelson Lund, former law clerk to O'Connor and associate counsel to George H. W. Bush, a dissenter might argue that the Florida Supreme Court on remand in Harris I was discussing the "protest provisions of the Florida Election Code, whereas the issues in Bush v. Gore arose under the contest provisions". In retort to himself, Lund writes that the Florida court's decision in the contest case did not mention any alternative possible deadlines. Peter Berkowitz writes, "Perhaps it would have been more generous for the Court to have asked the Florida court on remand whether 'outside deadline' referred to contest-period as well as protest-period recounts." Abner Greene points to evidence that "the Florida Supreme Court thought all manual recounts—whether protest or contest—must be completed no later than December 12." Nevertheless, Greene concludes "lack of clarity about the Florida Supreme Court's views on the safe-harbor provision should have resulted in a remand to that court for clarification", in addition to the remand of December 4. The Court in Bush v. Gore did remand the case instead of dismissing it, but the remand did not include another request for clarification. Louise Weinberg argues that even giving the U.S. Supreme Court the benefit of the doubt that it acted appropriately in intervening in Florida state law, its actions should be deemed unconstitutional because its intervention was not coupled with any kind of remedy aimed at determining the election's actual outcome.

Arguably, the Florida Supreme Court, after having stated on December 11 that December 12 was an "outside deadline", could have clarified its views on the safe-harbor provision or reinterpreted Florida law to state that December 12 was not a final deadline under Florida law, which the U.S. Supreme Court did not forbid the Florida Supreme Court from doing. Lund states that, as a practical matter, the Florida Supreme Court was unlikely to have actually been capable of conducting and completing a new constitutionally valid recount by the December 18 deadline for the meeting of the Electoral College.

Michael Abramowicz and Maxwell Stearns argue that if the Florida Supreme Court had clarified or reinterpreted Florida state law on remand, then the U.S. Supreme Court might have struck down the Florida Supreme Court's action as a violation of Article II of the Constitution. Abramowicz and Stearns point out that while Kennedy and O'Connor did not join Rehnquist's Article II concurrence, they did not explicitly oppose it either, and thus kept the door open to nullifying a future ruling of the Florida Supreme Court on Article II grounds. Abramowicz and Stearns also argue that if the Bush v. Gore decision genuinely allowed the Florida Supreme Court to clarify or reinterpret Florida state law and thus to order a new manual recount, then Souter and Breyer likely would have joined the opinion—which they did not. Laurence Tribe has a similar view on this issue, arguing that "[e]ven assuming the leeway [in regard to the remedy] the Court theoretically left open was real, the window it had failed to slam shut was hardly the sort of opening through which anyone would dare to crawl."

=== Limitation "to present circumstances" ===
Some critics of the decision argue that the majority seemed to seek refuge from their own logic in the following sentence in the majority opinion: "Our consideration is limited to the present circumstances, for the problem of equal protection in election processes generally presents many complexities." The Court's defenders argued that this was a reasonable precaution against the possibility that the decision might be read too broadly, arguing that in the short time available it would be inappropriate to attempt to craft language spelling out in greater detail how to apply the holding to other cases. But critics interpreted the sentence as stating that the case did not set precedent in any way and could not be used to justify any future court decision, and some suggested that this was evidence the majority realized its holding was untenable. Regardless of whether the majority intended the decision to be precedential, several federal courts have cited it in election cases, as did a lawyer for a Republican congressional candidate during legal arguments coincident with the 2020 United States presidential election.

=== Accusation of partisanship or conflict of interest ===
According to legal analyst Jeffrey Toobin, "Bush v. Gore broke David Souter's heart. The day the music died, he called it. It was so political, so transparently political, that it scarred Souter's belief in the Supreme Court as an institution" (italics in original). Various authors argued that conservative Republican-appointed justices ruled against Gore in this case for partisan reasons. Harvard University law professor Alan Dershowitz writes:

[T]he decision in the Florida election case may be ranked as the single most corrupt decision in Supreme Court history, because it is the only one that I know of where the majority justices decided as they did because of the personal identity and political affiliation of the litigants. This was cheating, and a violation of the judicial oath.

Chapman University School of Law professor Ronald Rotunda responded that Democratic-appointed justices of the Florida Supreme Court also ruled against Gore:

[T]hat claim ... is inconsistent with the position of three of the Florida justices who dissented. No Justice on the Florida Supreme Court was a Republican appointee, but three of them concluded that the recount that Vice President Gore wanted was unconstitutional. Three of the seven Florida Supreme Court justices also found an Equal Protection violation when the manual ballot-counters used different procedures to examine identical ballots and count them differently.

There has been further analysis of whether several justices had a conflict of interest that should have forced them to recuse themselves from the decision. On several occasions, Rehnquist had expressed interest in retiring under a Republican administration; one study found that press reports "are equivocal on whether facts existed that would have created a conflict of interest" for him. At an election night party, O'Connor became upset when it was reported that Gore had won Florida, her husband explaining that they would have to wait another four years before retiring to Arizona. Both justices remained on the Court until Bush's second term, with Rehnquist dying in 2005 and O'Connor retiring in 2006. According to Steven Foster of the Manchester Grammar School:

Clarence Thomas's wife was so intimately involved in the Bush campaign that she was helping to draw up a list of Bush appointees more or less at the same time as her husband was adjudicating on whether the same man would become the next President. Finally, Antonin Scalia's son was working for the firm appointed by Bush to argue his case before the Supreme Court, the head of which was subsequently appointed as Solicitor-General.

The day after Thanksgiving, when the conservative justices agreed to hear Bush's appeal in the case of Bush v. Palm Beach County Canvassing Board (excluding Bush's equal protection claim), the opposing justices were convinced that the majority intended to reverse the Florida Supreme Court and shut down the recount. They began drafting a dissent before this case was argued before them, a dissent that was temporarily shelved upon the Court's unanimous remand to the Florida court.

The liberal law clerks noted that Scalia later had begun campaigning for the stay of the Florida court's December 8 recount order before the Court had received Gore's response to Bush's request, and was so incensed at Stevens's dissent in the matter of the stay and grant of certiorari that he requested the release of opinions be delayed so that he could amend his opinion to include a response to Stevens. Kennedy is also reported to have sent out a memo accusing the dissenters of "trashing the court". Later, court personnel, as well as Ron Klain, speculated that there was an unspoken understanding that the judges on the winning side would not retire until after the next election, as a way of preserving some sense of fairness. No justices retired during President Bush's first term.

It has been argued that none of the justices voted in a way that was consistent with their prior jurisprudence. The five conservative justices involved the federal judiciary in a matter that could have been left to the states, while also expanding previous Supreme Court interpretations of the Equal Protection Clause. Meanwhile, the liberal justices all supported leaving the matter in the hands of a state and also sometimes advocated a narrower reading of Equal Protection Clause precedents. This bolstered the perception that the justices used their desired result to drive their reasoning. George Mason University law professor Nelson Lund has challenged this conclusion, arguing that, unlike in suspect classification cases, the Supreme Court has never actually required a showing of intentional discrimination in fundamental rights cases, such as Bush v. Gore. David Cole of Georgetown Law argued that, as a way of trying to rehabilitate the court's image after Bush v. Gore, the Court became more likely to reach a liberal decision in the four years after 2000 than it had been before the case, and that the conservative justices were more likely to join the liberals than the other way around.

=== Recount by media organizations ===
In 2001, the National Opinion Research Center (NORC) at the University of Chicago, sponsored by a consortium of major United States news organizations, conducted the Florida Ballot Project, a comprehensive review of 175,010 ballots that vote-counting machines had rejected from the entire state, not just the counties that conducted manual recounts. The project's goal was to determine the reliability and accuracy of the systems used in the voting process, including how different systems correlated with voter mistakes. The study was conducted over a period of 10 months. Based on the review, the media group concluded that if the disputes over the validity of all the ballots in question had been consistently resolved and any uniform standard applied, the electoral result would have been reversed and Gore would have won by 60 to 171 votes. On the other hand, under scenarios involving review of limited sets of ballots uncounted by machines, Bush would have kept his lead. In one such scenario—Gore's request for recounts in four predominantly Democratic counties—Bush would have won by 225 votes. (Note: Specifically, Gore's request for recounts in four counties: applies the "prevailing standard" (at least one corner of chad detached on punch card undervotes; any affirmative mark on optical scan ballots, but with no overvotes) to remaining uncounted ballots in Miami-Dade; accepts uncertified hand counts from Palm Beach and 139 precincts in Miami-Dade and certified counts from other 65 counties.) In another scenario (if the remaining 64 Florida counties had carried out the hand recount of disputed ballots the Florida Supreme Court ordered on December 8, applying the various standards that county election officials said they would have used), Bush would have emerged the victor by 493 votes. (Note: Specifically, Florida Supreme Court order as being implemented: accepts completed recounts in eight counties and certified counts from four counties that refused to recount; applies the "county custom standard" (what each individual county canvassing board considered a vote, in regard to both undervotes and overvotes) to remaining Miami-Dade and other 55 counties.)

The scenarios involving limited sets of ballots included the completed uncertified recount by Palm Beach County, which nevertheless had excluded a set-aside cache of dimpled ballots with clear indications of intent, an uncounted net gain of 682 votes for Gore. (Note: Of these 4,842 excluded ballots, 4,513 had been set aside by the canvassing board for later inspection by a court (which never happened). All were among 10,310 undervotes in the county. The "set aside" ballots were dimpled ballots that were challenged by the two parties. A January 2001 review by the Palm Beach Post of those "set-aside" ballots determined that 4,318 were "unambiguous" valid votes.) In contrast, the scenarios involving all uncounted ballots statewide considered all votes from Palm Beach County, subjected to various standards of inclusion. The Washington Post qualified the tallies conducted by the NORC consortium with the statement: "But no study of this type can accurately recreate Election Day 2000 or predict what might have emerged from individual battles over more than 6 million votes in Florida's 67 counties." Law professor Einer Elhauge criticized the scope of the media consortium's review, arguing that it examined only the approximately 3% of Florida ballots that had initially registered as undervotes or overvotes rather than also manually examining the approximately six million ballots that tabulating machines had recorded as valid votes to identify votes for presidential candidates that were incorrectly recorded as valid.

Further analysis revealed that black-majority precincts had three times as many rejected ballots as white precincts. "For minorities, the ballot survey found, a recount would not have redressed the inequities because most ballots were beyond retrieving. But a recount could have restored the votes of thousands of older voters whose dimpled and double-voted ballots were indecipherable to machines but would have been clear in a ballot-by-ballot review."

=== Critiques ===
Several articles have characterized the decision as damaging the reputation of the court, increasing the view of judges as partisan, and decreasing Americans' trust in the integrity of elections, an outcome Stevens predicted in his dissent. Part of the reason recounts could not be completed was the various stoppages ordered by the various branches and levels of the judiciary, most notably the Supreme Court. Opponents argued that it was improper for the Court (by the same five justices who joined the per curiam opinion) to grant a stay that preliminarily stopped the recounts based on Bush's likelihood of success on the merits and possible irreparable injury to Bush. Although stay orders normally do not include justification, Scalia concurred to express some brief reasoning to justify it, saying that one potential irreparable harm was that an invalid recount might undermine the legitimacy of Bush's election (presumably if, for example, it were to find that Gore should have won). Supporters of the stay, such as Charles Fried, contend that the stay's validity was vindicated by the ultimate decision on the merits and that the only thing the stay prevented was a recount "done in an unconstitutional way".

Some critics argued that the Court's decision was a perversion of the Equal Protection Clause and contrary to the political question doctrine. Scott Lemieux of University of Washington points out that if recounting votes without a uniform statewide standard were truly a violation of the Equal Protection Clause, this should have meant that the initial count, which also lacked a uniform standard, was itself unconstitutional. On the other hand, Geoffrey R. Stone has expressed sympathy with the Court's equal protection reasoning, even though Stone was dismayed by what he saw as the sudden and suspect conversion of Rehnquist, Scalia and Thomas to that equal protection principle. According to Stone:

No one familiar with the jurisprudence of Justices Rehnquist, Scalia, and Thomas could possibly have imagined that they would vote to invalidate the Florida recount process on the basis of their own well-developed and oft-invoked approach to the Equal Protection Clause.

Stevens's criticism of the Court in his dissent for questioning the impartiality of Florida's judiciary was itself criticized by Lund, a former law clerk for O'Connor. Professor Charles Zelden faults the per curiam opinion in the case for, among other things, not declaring that the nation's electoral system required significant reform, and for not condemning administration of elections by part-time boards of elections dominated by partisan and unprofessional officials. Zelden concludes that the Court's failure to spotlight this critical flaw in American electoral democracy made a replay of Bush v. Gore more likely, not less likely, either in Florida or elsewhere. In 2013, O'Connor, who had voted with the majority, said that the case "gave the court a less-than-perfect reputation". She added, "Maybe the court should have said, 'We're not going to take it, goodbye.' ... And probably the Supreme Court added to the problem at the end of the day."

A Vanity Fair article quotes several of the court's clerks at the time who were critical of the decision. They note that, despite the per curiam opinion's declaration that the case was taken "reluctantly", Kennedy had been rather enthusiastic about taking the case all along. They felt at the time, as had many legal scholars, that the case was unlikely to go to the Supreme Court at all. In fact some of the justices were so certain that the case would never come before them that they had already left for vacations.

== Public reaction ==
Editorials in the country's leading newspapers were overwhelmingly critical of the decision. A review by The Georgetown Law Journal found that the nation's top newspapers, by circulation, had published 18 editorials criticizing the decision and six praising it. They similarly published 26 op-eds criticizing the decision and eight defending it. Polls showed a range of reactions, with 37–65% of respondents believing that personal politics influenced the justices' decisions, depending on the poll. A Princeton Survey poll recorded 46% of respondents saying that the decision made them more likely to suspect partisan bias in judges in general. An NBC News/Wall Street Journal poll showed that 53% of respondents believed that the decision to stop the recount was based mostly on politics. A 2010 Slate article listed the case as the first in a series of events that eroded American trust in the results of elections, noting that the number of lawsuits brought over election issues had more than doubled since Bush v. Gore.

== See also ==
- List of United States presidential elections by Electoral College margin
- Electoral Commission (United States)
- Supreme Injustice, a 2001 book by Alan Dershowitz
- Unprecedented: The 2000 Presidential Election, a 2002 documentary
- Recount, a 2008 HBO movie about the 2000 presidential election and Bush v. Gore
- Post-election lawsuits related to the 2020 United States presidential election
- 2000 United States presidential election in popular culture
