= Bush v. Palm Beach County Canvassing Board =

- Supreme Court of the United States

Argued December 1, 2000 Decided December 4, 2000
- Full case name: Bush v. Palm Beach County Canvassing Board et al.
- Docket no.: 00-836
- Citations: 531 U.S. 70 (more) 121 S. Ct. 471; 148 L. Ed. 2d 366; 2000 U.S. LEXIS 8087; 69 U.S.L.W. 4020; 2000 Cal. Daily Op. Service 9599; 14 Fla. L. Weekly Fed. S 19

Case history
- Prior: Motion denied, Fla. Cir. Ct., November 17, 2000; matter certified to Florida Supreme Court, Fla. Ct. App.; sub nom. Palm Beach County Canvassing Bd. v. Harris, 772 So. 2d 1220 (Fla. 2000); cert. granted, 531 U.S. 1004 (2000)

Holding
- Decision vacated and case remanded for clarification

Court membership
- Chief Justice William Rehnquist Associate Justices John P. Stevens · Sandra Day O'Connor; Antonin Scalia · Anthony Kennedy; David Souter · Clarence Thomas; Ruth Bader Ginsburg · Stephen Breyer

Case opinion
- Per curiam

Bush v. Palm Beach County Canvassing Board, 531 U.S. 70 (2000), was a United States Supreme Court decision involving Florida voters during the 2000 presidential election. In this case, the U.S. Supreme Court requested clarification from the Florida Supreme Court regarding the decision it had made in Palm Beach County Canvassing Board v. Harris (Harris I). Shortly after the Florida Supreme Court provided those clarifications on December 11, the U.S. Supreme Court resolved the election in favor of George W. Bush over Al Gore in the case of Bush v. Gore.

== Background ==
The 2000 presidential election was contingent upon who won the popular vote in Florida. Republican George W. Bush was narrowly ahead in the tally. Democrat Al Gore challenged the decision of Katherine Harris, Florida's Secretary of State, to certify Bush as the winner on November 14 (a 7-day deadline set by Florida statute § 102.111). Gore asserted that Harris had disregarded manual recount results in four Florida counties. The Florida Supreme Court, in deciding between two conflicting provisions of Florida statute (§ 102.111 and § 102.112), enjoined Harris from certifying the election results and invoked its equitable powers to set a November 26 deadline for a return of ballot counts, thereby extending the deadline by 12 days. (The court allowed Harris the option of setting the deadline as November 27, which was a Monday. Harris did not.) The court directed Harris to accept manual recounts submitted prior to the new deadline. Bush then appealed the Florida Supreme Court decision to the U.S. Supreme Court.

== Issues before U.S. Supreme Court ==
The Court was faced with two questions. First, did post-election court decisions in Florida violate the Due Process Clause of the U.S. Constitution or 3 U.S.C. § 5? Second, did the Florida Supreme Court violate Article II of the United States Constitution, which confers plenary power in the appointment of Electors on state legislatures, when the Florida Supreme Court allegedly changed the manner in which Florida's electoral votes were chosen?

== Holding ==
The Court unanimously held that there was "considerable uncertainty" as to the reasons for the Florida Supreme Court's decision. According to Vanity Fair, "The unanimity was, in fact, a charade; four of the justices had no beef at all with the Florida Supreme Court, while at least four others were determined to overturn it." Therefore, the Court declined to review the questions presented, instead vacating the Florida Supreme Court decision and remanding the case for clarification of two questions. First, to what extent did the Florida Supreme Court see the Florida Constitution as circumscribing the legislature's authority under Article II of the federal Constitution (i.e., whether it had based its ruling on the state constitution, which the Bush team had said was improper, or had acted under state statute, which was arguably permissible.)? Second, how much consideration did the Florida Supreme Court give to a relevant federal statute, namely 3 U.S.C. § 5?

== See also ==
- Bush v. Gore (2000)
- Moore v. Harper (2023)
