= Gerald Kogan =

American judge (1933–2021)

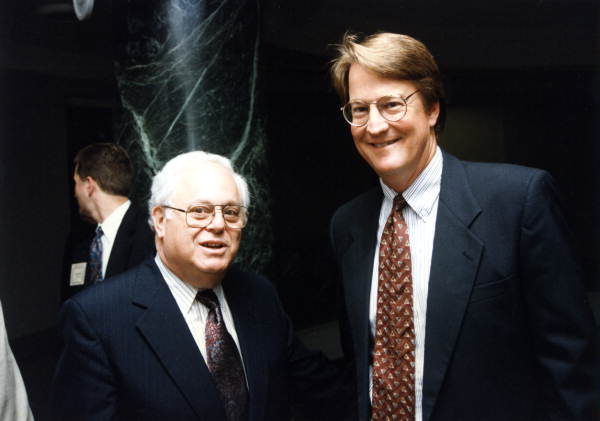
- Kogan with Florida House Speaker Peter Rudy Wallace on June 3, 1996

Chief Justice of the Florida Supreme Court
- In office 1996–1998
- Preceded by: Stephen H. Grimes
- Succeeded by: Major B. Harding

Justice of the Supreme Court of Florida
- In office January 1987 – December 31, 1998
- Appointed by: Bob Martinez
- Preceded by: Joseph A. Boyd Jr.
- Succeeded by: R. Fred Lewis

Personal details
- Born: May 23, 1933 Brooklyn, New York, U.S.
- Died: March 4, 2021 (aged 87) Miami, Florida, U.S.
- Spouse: Irene (m. 1955)
- Education: University of Miami

Gerald H. Kogan (May 23, 1933 – March 4, 2021) was a Justice of the Florida Supreme Court from January 30, 1987, to December 31, 1998. He served as chief justice from 1996 to 1998. He was born in New York City on May 23, 1933. He graduated from the University of Miami School of Law in 1955. He died on March 4, 2021.

== See also ==
- List of Jewish American jurists
