= Michael Johns (policy analyst) =

American conservative commentator (born 1964)

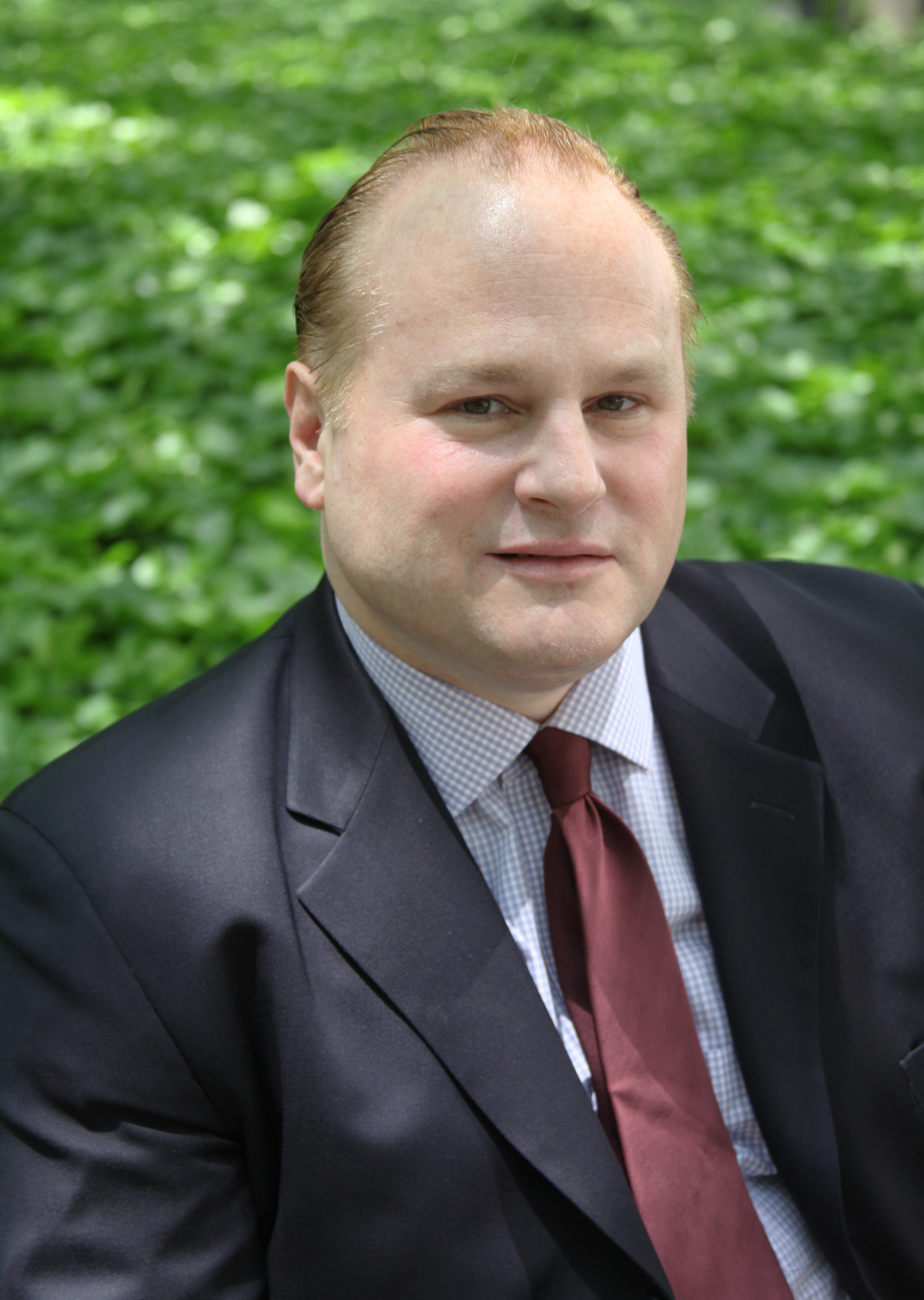
- Johns in 2013
- Born: September 8, 1964 (age 61); Allentown, Pennsylvania, U.S.
- Education: University of Miami (B.B.A.)
- Occupation(s): Health care executive, public policy analyst, writer, commentator
- Website: Official website

Michael Johns (born September 8, 1964) is an American conservative commentator, policy analyst, writer, a former speechwriter for President George H. W. Bush. He is a leader and spokesman in the Tea Party movement. He was also a health care executive.

== Early life and education ==
Johns was born in Allentown, Pennsylvania, and graduated from Emmaus High School. He graduated from the University of Miami in 1986, receiving a bachelor's degree in business administration with a major in economics. As a University of Miami student, he was inducted into the Iron Arrow Honor Society, the highest honor awarded a student by the university. He also studied humanities at the University of Cambridge, England.

== Political and public policy career ==
Johns began his political and public policy career as a Lyndon B. Johnson fellow working with Rep. Donald L. Ritter.

In 1986, he began work at The Heritage Foundation, a Washington, D.C.–based conservative think tank. Johns was an assistant editor of the Foundation's journal, Policy Review, for which he wrote on national security and foreign policy issues.

In 1988, he became a policy analyst for African and Third World affairs in the Heritage Foundation's foreign policy and defense studies department. While there, he researched and wrote on topics including South Africa, U.S. relations with Zaire and Kenya, the famine in Ethiopia, and the civil wars in Angola and Mozambique.

Johns was a White House speechwriter during the presidency of George H. W. Bush.

He has also worked for New Jersey governor and 9/11 Commission chairman Thomas Kean, Sen. Olympia Snowe and at the International Republican Institute.

Johns has been a spokesman for the Tea Party movement. He has served on the leadership team of the Nationwide Tea Party Coalition.

== Health care career ==
Johns was vice president of Gentiva Health Services and has held senior positions at Eli Lilly and Company and Electric Mobility Corporation.

== Books and commentary ==
Johns wrote the U.S. and Africa Statistical Handbook, and contributed to Finding Our Roots, Facing Our Future: America's 21st Century and Freedom in the World: The Annual Guide of Political Rights and Civil Liberties.

He has written for The Wall Street Journal, The Christian Science Monitor, National Review, Human Events, and other publications, and appeared as a commentator on CBS News, C-SPAN, and other media. In 2012, National Journal named him one of ten Republicans to follow on Twitter.

== Personal life ==
Johns has been a resident of Deptford Township, New Jersey.
