= José Szapocznik =

American psychologist

José Szapocznik (born in Havana, Cuba), is a clinical psychologist of Polish-Cuban ancestry and one of the nation's leading family therapists specializing in Hispanic families. He is the developer of One-Person Family Therapy and Brief Structural Therapy. He is a leading scholar on Hispanic psychology.

He is director of the Center for Family Studies at the University of Miami, where he has been inducted into the Iron Arrow Honor Society, the highest honor bestowed by the University of Miami. He has authored numerous scientific publications and has received numerous awards for his work on behalf of Hispanic families.
