= Xavier Cortada =

American eco-artist

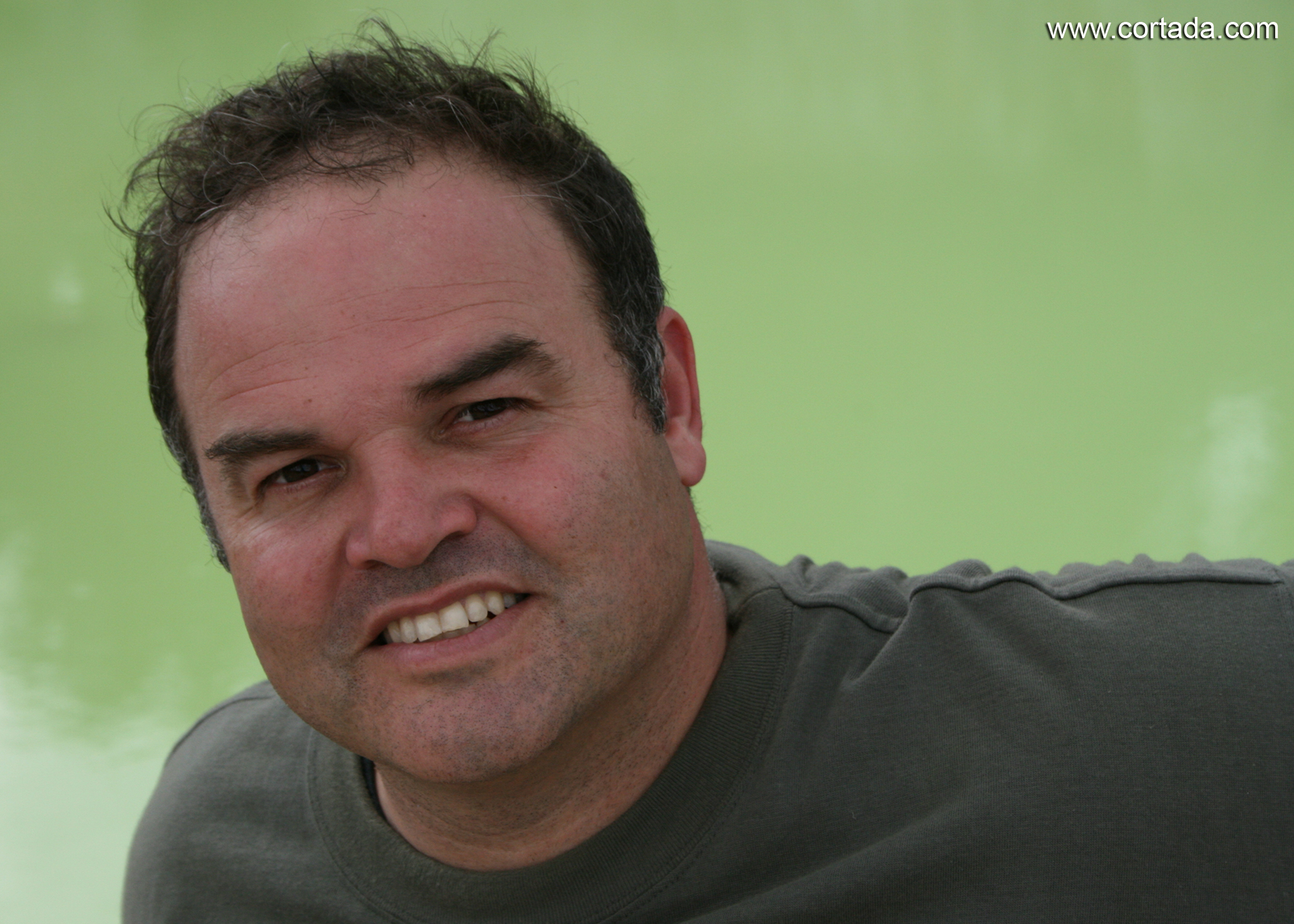
- Cortada in 2007
- Born: Xavier Ignacio Cortada; September 13, 1964 (age 61); Albany, New York, U.S.
- Education: University of Miami (BA in psychology and MA in public administration), University of Miami School of Law (JD)
- Occupation: Artist
- Years active: 1993-Present
- Known for: eco-art and social practice
- Awards: Environmental Law Institute National Wetlands Award; New York Foundation for the Arts Sponsored Artist; National Science Foundation Antarctic Artists and Writers Program; Millennium International Volunteer Award; Jubilee Day Artist at the Vatican
- Website: cortada.com

Xavier Ignacio Cortada (born September 13, 1964) is an American eco artist, public artist, and former lawyer. As a National Science Foundation Antarctic Artists and Writers Program fellow and a New York Foundation for the Arts-sponsored Artist, Cortada created works at the North Pole and South Pole to generate awareness about global climate change.

He has worked with groups globally to produce collaborative art projects, including peace murals in Cyprus and Northern Ireland, child welfare murals in Bolivia and Panama, AIDS murals in Switzerland and South Africa, juvenile justice murals and projects in Miami and Philadelphia, and eco-art projects in Taiwan, Hawaii, and the Netherlands.

Cortada has also been commissioned to create art for CERN, the White House, the World Bank, Florida Botanical Gardens, Miami City Hall, Miami-Dade County Hall, the Florida Turnpike, the Phillip and Patricia Frost Museum of Science, Museum of Florida History, Port Everglades, the Patricia and Phillip Frost Art Museum, and at ten Miami-Dade Housing Authority sites.

== Early life and education ==
Cortada was born in Albany, New York, on September 13, 1964, and raised in Miami. His parents are both Cuban immigrants. He attended the University of Miami, where he received a Bachelor of Arts from the College of Arts and Sciences in 1986, a Master of Public Administration from Miami Herbert Business School in 1991, and a Juris Doctor from the University of Miami School of Law in 1991. At the University of Miami, he was inducted into the Iron Arrow Honor Society, the highest honor bestowed by the university.

== Career ==
Early in his childhood, Cortada was fascinated with mangroves during family trips to Bear Cut Key in Key Biscayne, Florida. The plant functions as a central theme to many of his socially engaged artworks and public art projects.

Between 1997 and 2007, Cortada received support from Miami-Dade Cultural Affairs Council's Community Grants to implement art projects with Miami-Dade Art in Public Places, the University of Miami Miller School of Medicine, University of Miami School of Law, Centro Campesino, Miami Lighthouse for the Blind, Citizens for a Better South Florida, Hands-on Miami, and the Office of the Public Defender.

In 1998, the State of Florida Division of Cultural Affairs’ Artist Residency grant helped him implement the Reach for the Future Miami-Dade Art in Public Places residency at Palm Springs Middle School in Hialeah, Florida in 1998.

In 1999, with a Miami-Dade Cultural Affairs Council/Art Center South Florida's New Forms Artists Grant, he implemented the "WebStudio Project," an Internet-based collaborative art project using two webcams and a live chat room.

Cortada served as artistic director of various efforts sponsored by Miami-Dade Art in Public Places, including Master Peace, a school-based art project in Miami-Dade County Public Schools, and the Public Art Transforming Housing in Miami-Dade Housing Agency (PATH).

Cortada also volunteered with U.S. embassies in four continents and implemented numerous international mural projects through grant awards and artist residencies. He did so with the support of various entities, including the U.S. State Department and USAID.

In February 2000, invited by the Holy See, Cortada visited St. Peter's Basilica to participate in the Jubilee Day for Artists and meet Pope John Paul II. That summer, he was invited to create a mural for the White House Conference on Minority Homeownership. The president was one of the participants of his collaborative mural.

In 2007, as a National Science Foundation Antarctic Artist and Writer's Program Fellow, the artist used the moving ice sheet beneath the South Pole as an instrument to mark time; the art piece will be completed in 150,000 years. In 2008, he planted a green flag at the North Pole to reclaim it for nature and launch an eco-art reforestation effort.

=== Artistic collaborations ===
- At CERN, Cortada worked with a physicist to develop a site-specific art installation capturing the five search strategies, which the CMS experiment has used to discover a new Higgs-like particle. The five giant banners hang at the location (100m below the ground) where the particle was discovered.
- He has worked with a population geneticist on a project exploring ancestral journeys out of Africa 60,000 years ago, with a molecular biologist to synthesize an actual DNA strand made from a sequence randomly generated by participants visiting his museum exhibit, and with botanists in participatory eco-art projects to reforest mangroves, native trees and wildflowers.
- Cortada is working with scientists at Hubbard Brook Long Term Ecological Research Network on a water cycle visualization project driven by real-time data collected at a watershed in the White Mountains in New Hampshire.
- At Florida International University, Cortada collaborated with Florida Coastal Everglades LTER scientists in using the diatoms they study to address sea level rise and environmental degradation. From 2011 to 2018, Cortada based his engaged art-science practice at Florida International University. where he served as Artist-in-Residence at FIU School of Environment, Arts and Society, the FIU College of Arts, Sciences & Education, and the FIU College of Communication, Architecture and The Arts.
- He has worked with groups globally on collaborative art projects, including peace murals in Cyprus and Northern Ireland, child welfare murals in Bolivia and Panama, AIDS murals in Switzerland and South Africa, juvenile justice murals and projects in Miami and Philadelphia, and eco-art projects in Taiwan, Hawaii, the Netherlands, and Latvia.

Cortada has been commissioned to create art for CERN, the White House, the World Bank, the Florida Supreme Court, the Florida Governor's Mansion, Florida Botanical Gardens, Miami City Hall, Miami-Dade County Hall, the Florida Turnpike, Miami-Dade Housing Authority, the Frost Science Museum, Museum of Florida History, and the Frost Art Museum.

His work is in the permanent collections of the Perez Art Museum Miami (PAMM), the NSU Museum of Art in Ft. Lauderdale, Florida, the Whatcom Museum, the Patricia and Philip Frost Art Museum and the MDC Museum of Art + Design.

General Mills, Nike, Heineken, and Hershey's have commissioned his art. Publishers, including McDougal and Random House, have featured it in school textbooks and publications. His work has also been featured in National Geographic TV and the Discovery Channel.

Cortada's studio is located at Pinecrest Gardens, where he serves as artist-in-residence, implements his participatory art projects and runs the Hibiscus Gallery. He lso serves on boards of various national, regional and local groups, including University of Miami Alumni Association, South Arts, and the Miami-Dade Cultural Affairs Council.

== Notable works ==
Cortada has created art in the North and South poles and across six continents and also leads a robust community-engaged art practice. Some of his socially engaged works include:

- Letters to the Future (2019)
- Plan(T) (2019)
- Underwater HOA (2018)
- Florida is... Nature (2015)
- In Search of Higgs boson (2013)
- Flor500 (2013)
- Wind Words (2012)
- Sequentia (2010)
- Ancestral Journeys (2010)
- Ancestral Dinner Party (2010)
- Endangered World: Life Wall (2009)
- Native Flags (2008)
- Arctic Ice Paintings (2008)
- Longitudinal Installation (2007)
- Antarctic Ice Paintings (2007)
- Reclamation Project (2006)
