= Florida Botanical Gardens =

Gardens in Largo, Florida

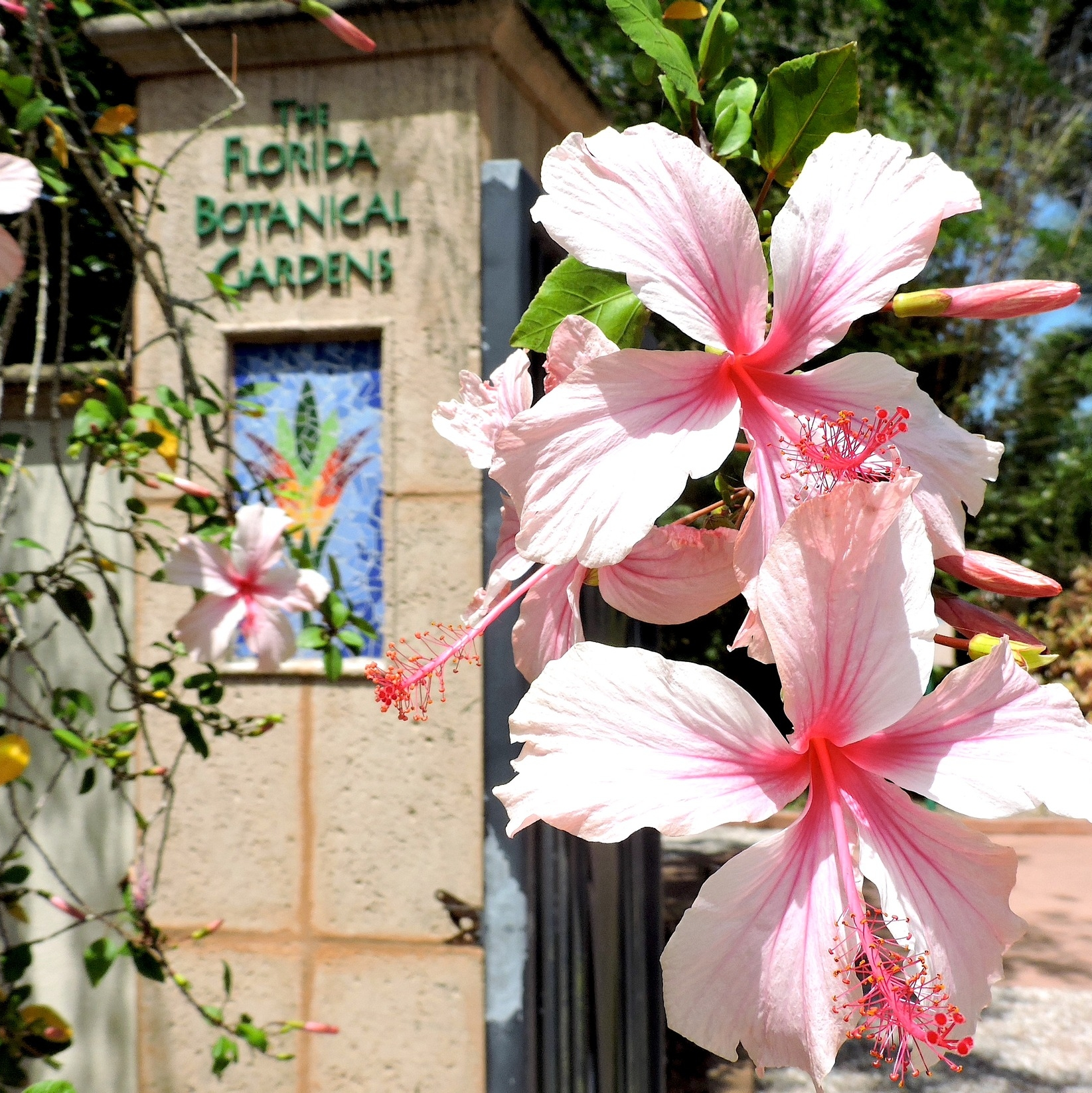
- A blooming hibiscus photographed near the Walsingham Entrance
- Interactive map of Florida Botanical Gardens
- Location: Largo, Florida
- Coordinates: 27°52′59.16″N 82°48′31″W
- Area: 182 acres (74 ha)
- Opened: December 2000
- Website: www.flbgfoundation.org

The Florida Botanical Gardens (FBG) is a 182-acre (74 ha) botanical garden located in Largo, Florida, within Pinewood Cultural Park. The gardens feature a variety of flora, fauna, and natural resources. The park also contains Heritage Village, the Creative Pinellas art gallery, and the University of Florida's Institute of Food and Agricultural Sciences (UF/IFAS) extension for Pinellas County.

== History ==
The idea of the gardens started in 1991 when the Cooperative Extension Service proposed the founding of a new outdoor learning center. The plan gained support from the Pinellas County Commission, which pledged $1 million and 13 additional acres for the new facility.

The Florida Botanical Gardens Foundation (FBGF) is a 501(c)(3) nonprofit organization that provides financial support for the Florida Botanical Gardens. The FBGF began in 1993 as the Friends of the Gardens to encourage interest in and support for a botanical garden in Pinellas County.

== Types of gardens ==
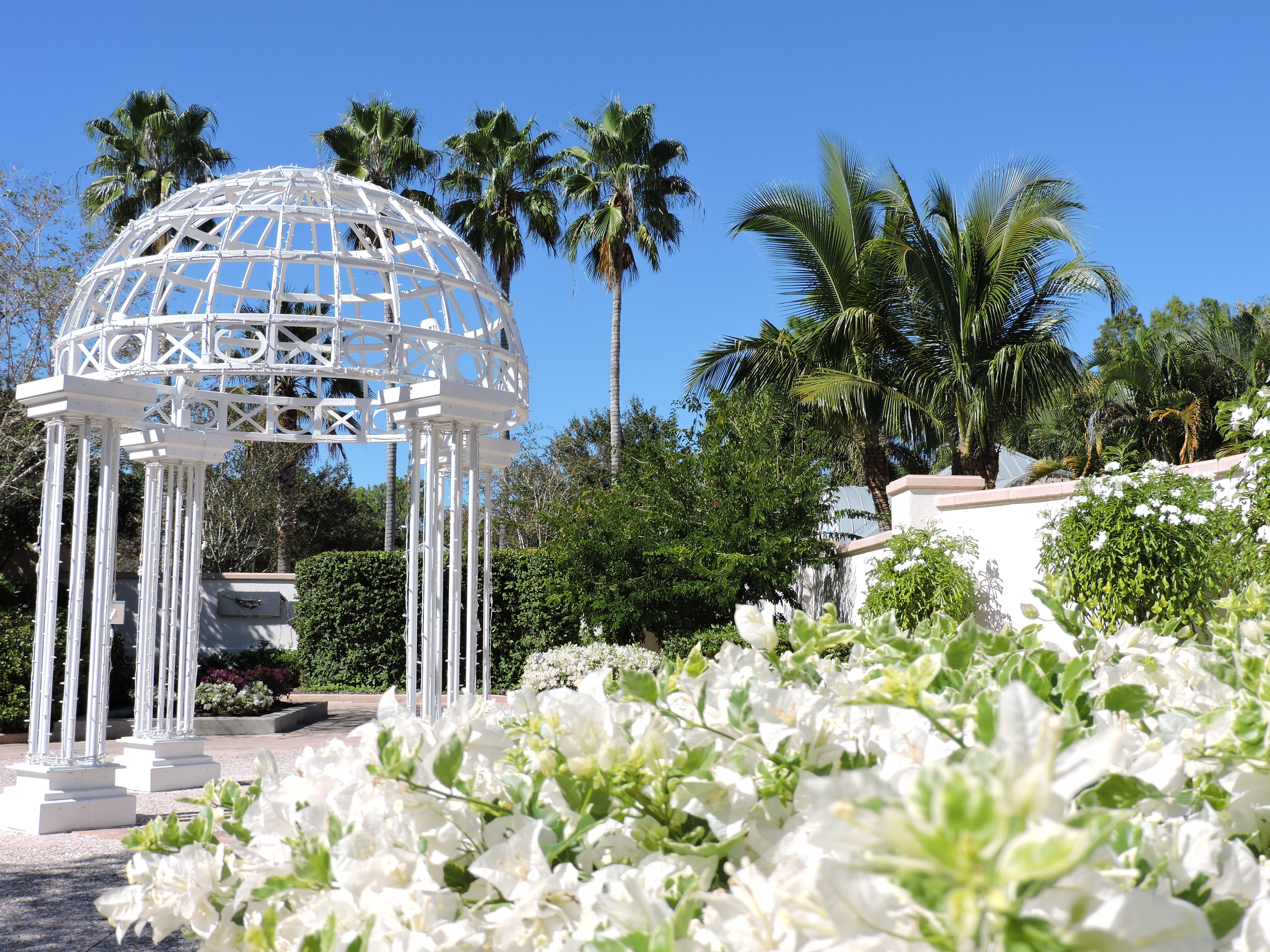
A gazebo surrounded by blooming flowers in the Wedding Garden.

The FBG is divided into several demonstration areas, including a few formal gardens. The Wedding Garden serves as a venue for weddings of all sizes. Each year on Valentine's Day, the garden hosts a group wedding event where couples can marry or renew their vows. The Butterfly Garden, located near the Visitor Center at the Ulmerton Entrance, contains butterflies year-round.

The Cactus/Succulent Garden contains varieties such as agave, prickly pear, desert rose, night-blooming cereus, and crown of thorns. The Cottage Garden is modeled after traditional English gardens and features perennial flowers, vines, and small shrubs, alongside trellises supporting roses, white Thunbergia, and pink Pandorea pandorana. The Herb Garden includes culinary and medicinal herbs ranging from lavender to Chinese cinnamon. The Jazz Garden uses an informal layout and contains various annuals and perennials. The McKay Creek Plaza features shell and mosaic patterns and serves as a site for public community events, including the annual Holiday Lights in the Gardens.

The Native Plant Garden contains species indigenous to Florida, such as native annuals, marlberry, firebush, sugarberry, and stokes astor. The Palm Garden has an umbrella-covered seating area, a fountain feature, and a pavilion off the plaza for groups to gather. The Rose Garden displays multiple rose varieties with an emphasis on cultivation and maintenance within the Florida landscape. The Topiary Garden shows various forms of topiary.

The design of the Tropical Courtyard is inspired by the walled gardens of southern Florida, with covered porches, arbors, and shade trees. The Tropical Fruit Garden displays regional and global specimens from Australia, Japan, China, the tropical islands, and South Florida. This section includes a seating area and a mural amidst fruit-bearing plants such as bananas, avocados, mangoes, and papayas.

The Vinery contains several "hubbles" covered with both tropical and temperate vines. The Wetlands Walkway and Wildlife Overlook, added in 2018, provide a boardwalk trail and viewing platforms for observing native flora and fauna.

== Majeed Discovery Garden ==
The Majeed Discovery Garden (MDG) is a place for children to learn and explore an accessible children's garden, located inside the FBG. The 2 acres (0.81 ha) site is located along McKay Creek with 500 linear feet of frontage. It is also adjacent to an acre of wetland and native plant buffer on the east and southern boundaries of the Garden, and includes a pond area for additional exploration of aquatic ecosystems. The MDG is for hands-on and experiential education. Its goal is to entice, engage, and educate children through discovery and play. The garden has an outdoor classroom, sensory garden, pollinator landing, and potting area.

The total estimated construction cost is $3 million, including design, permits, and construction. $800,000 has been secured from additional donors, including a generous gift from the David Berolzheimer Foundation. The Majeed Foundation has contributed $1 million. The FBGF has provided over $500,000 for the initial costs.

== Programs and partnerships ==
The Florida Botanical Gardens is managed by Pinellas County Parks and Conservation Resources Department, with partnerships with many organizations, such as Creative Pinellas, Florida Native Plant Society, Florida Nursery, Growers and Landscape Association (FNGLA), Florida West Coast Orchid Society, UF/IFAS Extension, Heritage Village, Professional Association of Visual Artists (PAVA), Pinellas County 4-H Association, Pinellas County Farm Bureau, Tampa Bay Water, Pinellas County, and Pinellas Community Foundation.

These partnerships create activities and events for people of all ages, including family-friendly programs like scavenger hunts and art exhibitions. The Gardens' formal partnership with University of Florida’s Institute of Food and Agricultural Sciences (UF/IFAS) also provides opportunities for home gardeners and landscape professionals on various procedures. The FBG is a demonstration garden for UF/IFAS. The Visitor Center at the FBG is home to the Pinellas Extension of UF/IFAS and offers diagnostic services and other information about plants and agriculture.

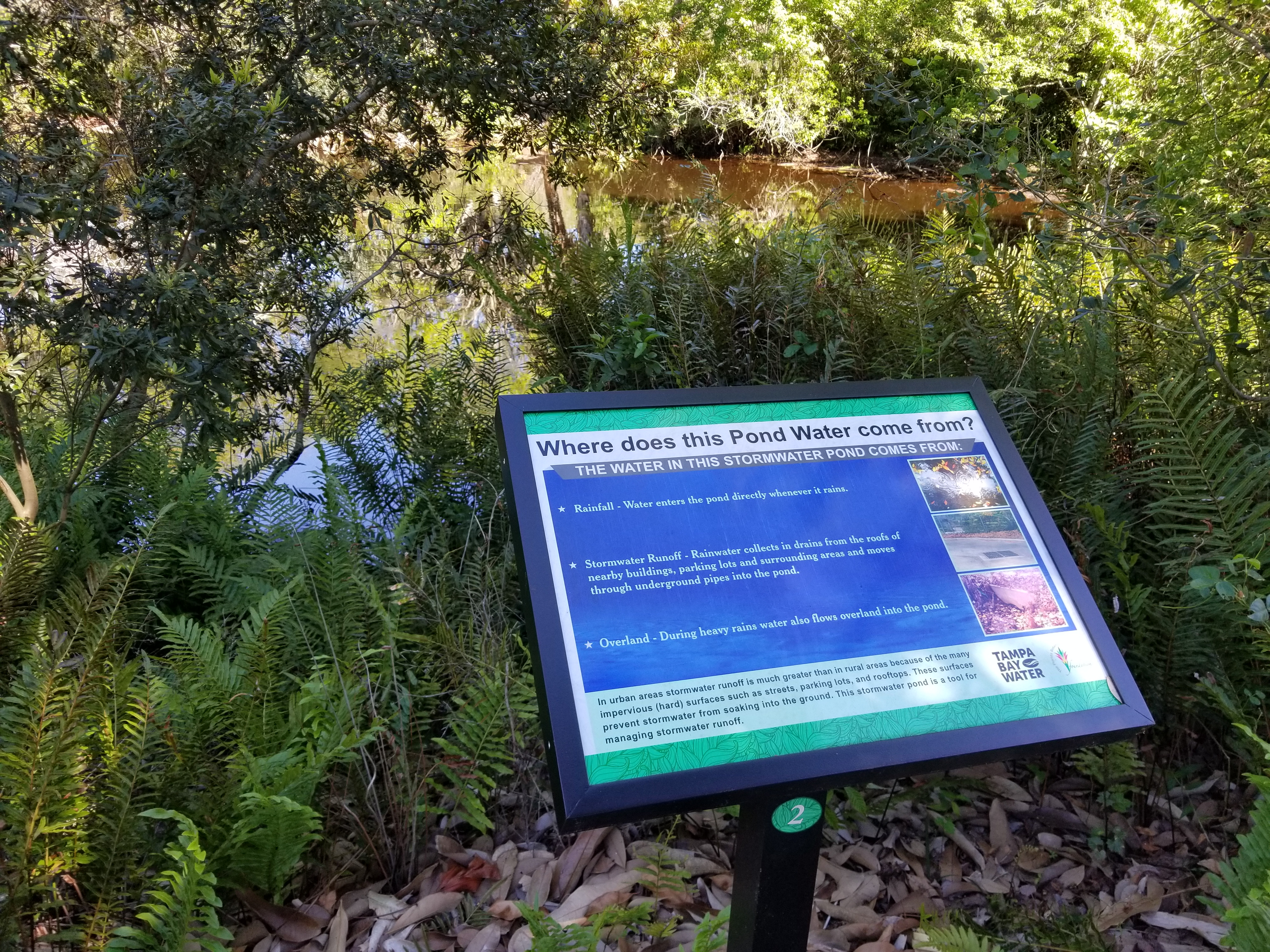
An educational sign about pond water placed in the Florida Botanical Gardens.

A collaboration with Tampa Bay Water is providing educational outreach, as the FBGF was one of several organizations and schools that received a combined $30,000 in grant funds from Tampa Bay Water. $5,500 of this money was used to manufacture and install 15 new educational signs about water use and conservation.

The Foundation collaborates with the Florida West Coast Orchid Society (FWCOS) on various events, including repotting clinics, plant sales, and other activities. FWCOS is a non-profit plant society dedicated to the preservation and conservation of orchids. It is an affiliated society of the American Orchid Society and is open to everyone interested in the culture, enjoyment, and study of orchids.

== Membership ==
The FBGF consists of just under 800 members of various levels. Members enjoy discounts, special invitations, and other exclusive benefits such as acceptance into the American Horticulture Society's Reciprocal Admissions Program (RAP). The RAP affords FBGF members discounts on admission and other services at over 300 botanical gardens and arboreta across the U.S., Canada, and a number of Caribbean Isles. FBGF members also receive discounts in the FBGF Gift Shop and in other local nurseries.

In addition to the monetary benefits, FBGF members can participate in exclusive events, such as the Holiday Lights Preview Party, where they receive a first-access look at the 1 million twinkling lights. The Foundation hosts its members-only Annual Meeting to bring its members together and celebrate the growth of the Gardens.

== Events ==
A significant part of fundraising for the FBGF comes from events. The largest and longest-running event is Holiday Lights in the Gardens, its annual winter fundraiser. The event begins the day after Thanksgiving and ends on the first day of the new year. The Gardens sparkle with 1 million LED lights in a multitude of colors. Vibrant laser lights and illuminated figures enhance the displays.

The Pinellas African American Heritage Celebration (PAAHC) is a one-day festival showcasing Black history and culture at Pinewood Cultural Park (Florida Botanical Gardens, Heritage Village, Creative Pinellas). The goal of this festival is to exhibit the diversity within Pinellas County. It aims to highlight the many talents of students within Pinellas County Schools, as well as talented local artists, entrepreneurs, and restaurateurs.

The Florida Native Plant Symposium aims to educate the public on Florida’s native plants. This event features keynote speakers, vendors, breakout sessions, and tours that showcase the Gardens' Florida-native plants. The Tour of Private and Public Gardens is a collaboration between the FBG and local garden owners. Event-goers receive guided tours of the FBG, as well as private access to beautiful and varied Pinellas County gardens. Pumpkin Fest is a fall-themed festival that showcases a pumpkin patch, a scarecrow contest, pumpkin carving, and other activities. Outside vendors take part in this event by providing information and other activities. The Foundation's Botanical Bounty Gift Shop showcases its seasonal items for sale.

Hops Night in the Gardens is a partnership between the Foundation and local breweries, creating a beer sampling event open to the public. Hops Night 2022 took place in the winter, allowing visitors to enjoy beer under the twinkling holiday lights. The Gift & Plant Sale also takes place during the winter holiday season, allowing event-goers to shop with various gift and plant vendors while enjoying the lights.

Third Saturdays at Pinewood is a collaboration between the Pinewood Partners: The Florida Botanical Gardens, Creative Pinellas, and Heritage Village. On the third Saturday of every month, the partners invite the public to participate in events that connect all three organizations. Throughout the year, various other events are also held, including wreath workshops, plant sales, garden tours, and more. These events also invite the community to get involved through volunteering.

== See also ==
- List of botanical gardens and arboretums in Florida
