= Nelson Lund =

American legal scholar

Academic background
- Education: St. John's College (BA); Catholic University of America (MA); Harvard University (MA, PhD); University of Chicago (JD)

Academic work
- Discipline: Constitutional law
- Institutions: Antonin Scalia Law School at George Mason University

Nelson Lund is an American legal scholar who serves as Distinguished University Professor at the Antonin Scalia Law School at George Mason University, where he previously served as Patrick Henry Professor of Constitutional Law and the Second Amendment.

== Education and career ==
Lund graduated from St. John's College in 1974 with a Bachelor of Arts in liberal arts. He received a Master of Arts in philosophy from Catholic University of America in 1978, then did graduate study in political science at Harvard University, receiving a Master of Arts in 1979 and a Ph.D. in 1981. After spending a year as a professor at the University of Chicago, Lund attended the University of Chicago Law School, where he was an executive editor of the University of Chicago Law Review and the chairman of the school's chapter of the Federalist Society. He graduated in 1985 with a Juris Doctor, cum laude, and Order of the Coif membership.

After law school, Lund was a law clerk to Judge Patrick Higginbotham of the U.S. Court of Appeals for the Fifth Circuit from 1985 to 1986. He was an attorney-advisor in the United States Department of Justice's Office of Legal Counsel, then was a law clerk to Justice Sandra Day O'Connor of the U.S. Supreme Court from 1987 to 1988.

Lund served as Associate Counsel to President George H. W. Bush from 1989 to 1992, when he joined the faculty of the George Mason University School of Law.

From 2003 to 2013, he held George Mason's Patrick Henry Professorship of Constitutional Law and the Second Amendment—a position created and endowed with a $1 million donation from the National Rifle Association of America.

== Political and legal views ==
Nelson Lund is a staunch supporter of gun rights and argues that the Second Amendment to the United States Constitution's original meaning supports a wide variety of gun rights being legal. He is an opponent of race-based affirmative action and argues that it is unconstitutional based on the 14th Amendment to the United States Constitution. Lund has also been a staunch critic of Jack Balkin's "living originalism" and its arguments for the unconstitutionality of same-sex marriage bans, arguing that this would leave originalism in a state similar to women during coverture. In addition, he has strongly criticized what he called Justice Neil Gorsuch's "living textualism" in the 2020 Bostock v. Clayton County case.

Nelson Lund is a staunch defender of the outcome and legal analysis in the 2000 Bush v. Gore case. Specifically, Lund argues that it took great integrity and courage (including from some Justices who previously exhibited a lack of courage in some other contexts) for the United States Supreme Court to overturn the Florida Supreme Court in Bush v. Gore and to, in his view, properly and correctly interpret the law and the US Constitution in spite of the fact that it knew that it would receive vehement hate and criticism for this from many left-wing Americans afterwards. Lund has also critiqued Akhil Amar's critique of Bush v. Gore. Crucial to Lund's argument is that the Bush court was not acting contrary to precedent since past U.S. Supreme Court precedents only required a showing of intentional discrimination in suspect classifications cases, not in fundamental rights cases like voting rights, and that the U.S. Supreme Court did not forbid the Florida Supreme Court from clarifying or reinterpreting Florida state election law and thus ordering a new, constitutional manual recount (but also that, as a practical matter, there was not enough time for the Florida Supreme Court to actually do this, which, in Lund's view, explains why Al Gore conceded immediately after the Bush v. Gore ruling by the U.S. Supreme Court instead of returning to the Florida Supreme Court right afterwards to ask them to attempt the impossible). Lund also argues that Justice John Marshall Harlan II's dissents in Baker v. Carr, Wesberry v. Sanders, Gray v. Sanders, and Reynolds v. Sims were completely correct and that those cases were thus wrongly decided, but also that Bush v. Gore was correctly decided regardless of whether or not one believes that those 1960s one person, one vote precedents were wrongly decided, since in Lund's opinion the Florida manual recount that the U.S. Supreme Court struck down in Bush v. Gore was so irrational and illogical that it failed to pass or satisfy even Justice Harlan's extremely forgiving rational basis test that he proposed in cases such as Reynolds v. Sims.

== Selected works ==
=== Books ===
- Lund, Nelson (2016). Rousseau's Rejuvenation of Political Philosophy: A New Introduction. New York: Palgrave Macmillan. ISBN 978-3319413891.

=== Articles ===
- Lund, Nelson (1987). "The Second Amendment, Political Liberty, and the Right to Self-Preservation". Alabama Law Review. 39 (1): 101–30.
- — (1995). "Lawyers and the Defense of the Presidency". BYU Law Review. 1995 (1): 17–98.
- — (1996). "The Past and Future of the Individual's Right to Arms". Georgia Law Review. 31 (1): 1–76.
- — (2002). "The Unbearable Rightness of Bush v. Gore". Cardozo Law Review. 15 (1/2): 437–506.
- —; McGinnis, John O. (2004). "Lawrence v. Texas and Judicial Hubris". Michigan Law Review. 102 (7): 1555–1614.
- — (2009). "The Second Amendment, Heller, and Originalist Jurisprudence". UCLA Law Review. 56 (5): 1343–76.
