= Supreme Injustice =

2001 book

Supreme Injustice: How the High Court Hijacked Election 2000
- Author: Alan Dershowitz
- Publisher: Oxford University Press
- Publication date: June 1, 2001

Supreme Injustice: How the High Court Hijacked Election 2000 is a book by Alan Dershowitz. Dershowitz criticized the U.S. Supreme Court's 5–4 majority decision as partisan in Bush v. Gore, which ended the Florida election recount.

Dershowitz also said that the majority justices "shamed themselves and the Court on which they serve, and...defiled their places in history" and called the decision "the most perverse misuse of the Equal Protection Clause I've seen in my 40 years of law."

== See also ==
- Unprecedented: The 2000 Presidential Election – documentary featuring Dershowitz
- Bush v. Gore
