= Iron Arrow Honor Society =

Honor society at University of Miami, US

- Founded: 1926; 100 years ago University of Miami
- Type: Honor
- Affiliation: Independent
- Status: Active
- Emphasis: Scholarship and leadership
- Scope: Local
- Chapters: 1
- Headquarters: Coral Gables, Florida; United States
- Website: ironarrow.miami.edu

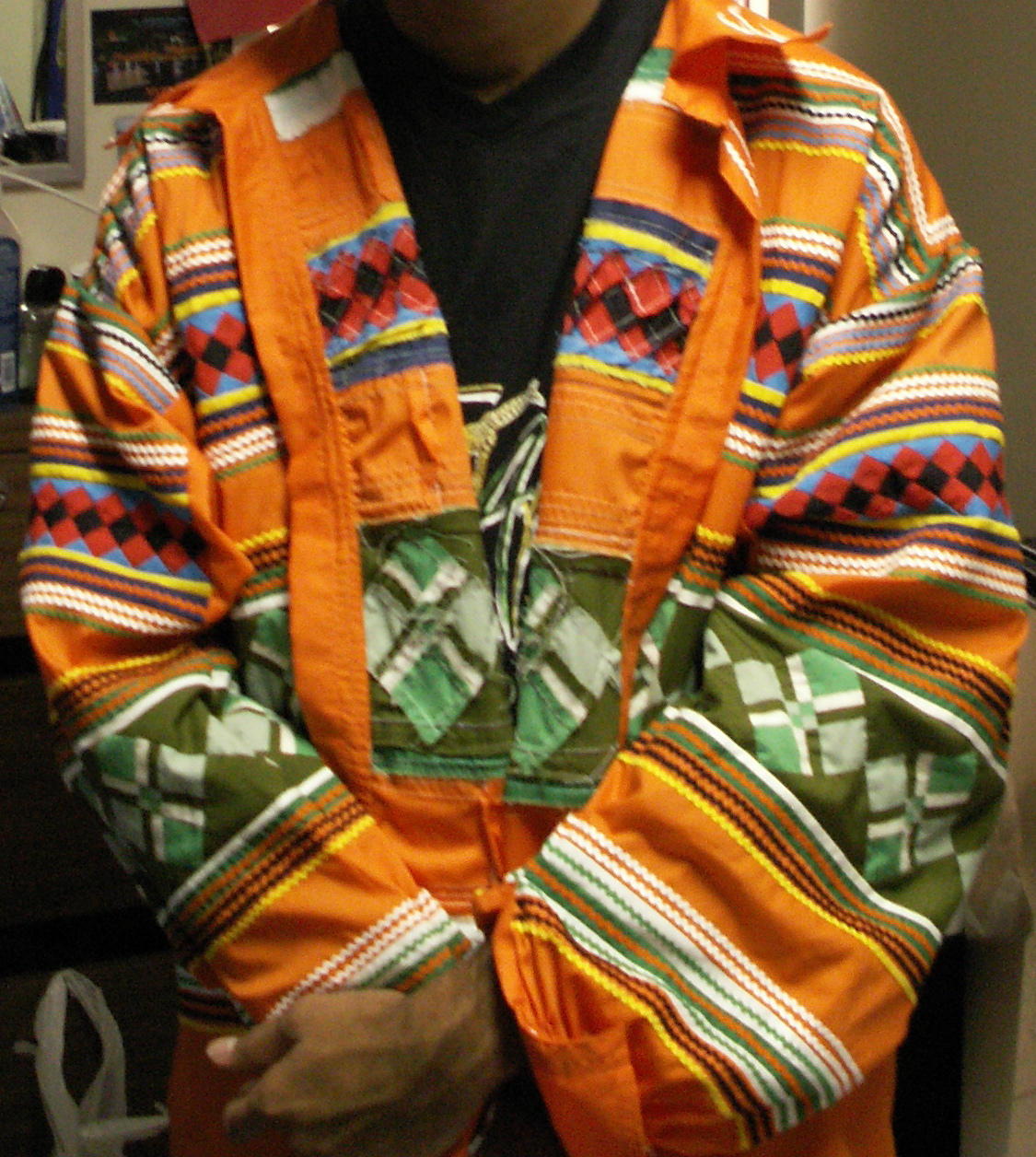
The distinctive Seminole patchwork jackets worn by members of the University of Miami's Iron Arrow Honor Society, the highest honor bestowed by the university

The Iron Arrow Honor Society is an honor society at the University of Miami in Coral Gables, Florida for students, faculty, staff, and alumni. It is the highest honor that the university can bestow upon someone.

Founded at the University of Miami in 1926, the society admits about thirty members annually, including undergraduate, School of Law and Miller School of Medicine students, alumni, and University of Miami faculty, staff, and administrators. Membership requires unanimous votes of the membership. Criteria include scholarship, leadership, character, humility, and love of alma mater.

== History ==
=== 20th century ===
In 1926, the Iron Arrow Honor Society was founded at the University of Miami as the "highest honor attained by men." Later that year, the Iron Arrow Honor Society was influential in proposing that a lake at the center of the University of Miami campus be named Lake Osceloa in recognition of Osceola, a legendary 19th century Seminole tribal leader and warrior.

In 1937, Nu Kappa Tau, a separate sister organization at the university, was founded as "The Highest Honor Attained by Women." In 1966, Nu Kappa Tau became affiliated with Mortar Board, a national honor society, "leaving Iron Arrow to carry the tradition alone," Miami Magazine reported in 2000.

In 1976, the U.S. federal government notified the University of Miami that it was providing significant assistance to Iron Arrow in violation of Title IX of the Education Amendments of 1972. The university then required that Iron Arrow move its tapping ceremony off campus, and it began urging the organization to begin accepting women members.

Later that year, in October 1976, Iron Arrow responded by filing a lawsuit against the federal government. In the suit, Iron Arrow Honor Society v. Hufsted, filed in U.S. District Court for the Southern District of Florida, Iron Arrow sought a declaration of their right to operate as an all-male organization.

The case was subsequently appealed to the U.S. Supreme Court in Iron Arrow Honor Soc. v. Heckler (464 U.S. 67), which agreed to hear the case in 1983. In 1982, however, then university president Edward T. Foote II wrote Iron Arrow, stating that regardless of how the U.S. Supreme Court ruled on the case that Iron Arrow would not be allowed back on campus as a male-only organization.

Three years later, in 1985, breaking with over fifty years of tradition, the society's all-male membership voted to admit women, and Iron Arrow was then allowed back on campus.

Iron Arrow Honor Society has been the subject of two books, Iron Arrow: A History, published in 1976, and Iron Arrow: A History, Seventy-Five Years published in 2001.

=== 21st century ===
In 2022, the University of Miami's student senate passed a non-binding resolution calling for the disaffiliation of the society from the university.

== Symbols ==
The Iron Arrow Honor Society adopted Seminole Indian motifs for its symbolism, including the regalia of a Seminole-themed jacket worn as its emblem. A version of this jacket serves as the identifying logo on its website.

== Controversies ==
In July 2020, Iron Arrow faced criticism from some in the University of Miami community and some Native Americans for "cultural appropriation," though the Iron Arrow Honor Society is an officially sanctioned clan of the Miccosukee tribe of Florida.

== Notable members ==
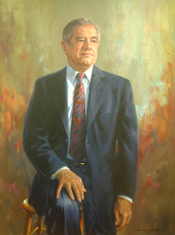
Dante Fascell

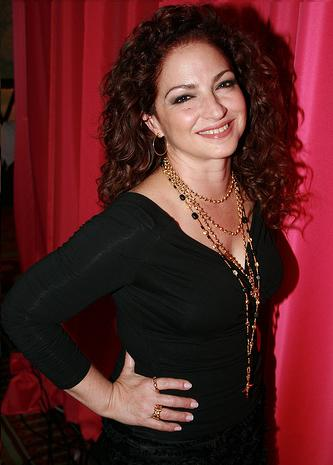
Gloria Estefan

Name	Notability
Bowman Foster Ashe	former president, University of Miami
G. Holmes Braddock	former president, Miami-Dade County Public School Board
Xavier Cortada	artist
Gloria Estefan	Grammy Award-winning singer and songwriter
Dante Fascell	former U.S. member of Congress
Michael Johns	health care executive and former White House presidential speechwriter
Dexter Lehtinen	former U.S. attorney for Southern District of Florida
R. Fred Lewis	former chief justice, Supreme Court of Florida
Russell Maryland	former professional football player, Dallas Cowboys, Green Bay Packers, and Oakland Raiders
Jackie Nespral	WTVJ and NBC News anchor
Alex Penelas	former mayor, Miami-Dade County
Jon Secada	Grammy Award-winning musician
Donna Shalala	former University of Miami president, U.S. Secretary of Health and Human Services, and Clinton Foundation president
José Szapocznik	clinical psychologist
Robert H. Traurig	founder of Greenberg Traurig
Lauryn Williams	2004 Olympics silver medalist in women's 100-metres
