= Paul G. Hyman Jr. =

United States judge

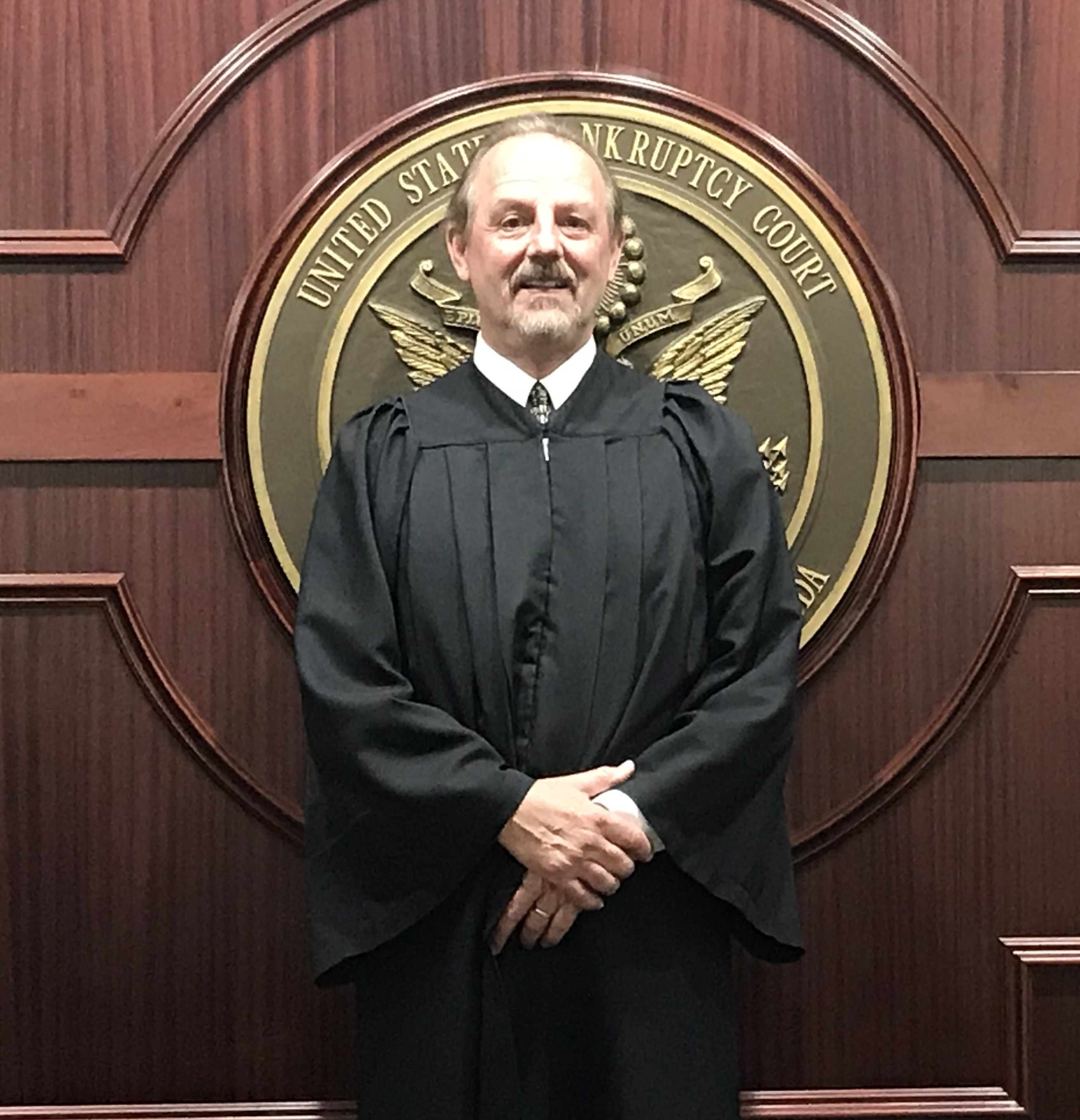

Judge of the United States bankruptcy court, Southern District of Florida
- Incumbent
- Assumed office 2006

Personal details
- Born: Paul George Hyman, Jr. September 17, 1952 (age 74) Miami, Florida
- Education: Vanderbilt University (B.A.); University of Miami School of Law (J.D.)

Paul George Hyman, Jr. (born September 17, 1952) is a judge for the United States bankruptcy court, Southern District of Florida. He was formerly Chief judge.

== Early life and education ==
Hyman received a bachelor's degree in economics from Vanderbilt University in 1974. He received a Juris Doctor in 1977 from the University of Miami School of Law.

== Legal career ==
Hyman was admitted to the Florida Bar in 1977. He began his legal career as an assistant attorney for the Britton Cohen Kaufman & Schantz from 1977 to 1979, practicing commercial litigation. In 1979, he became an Assistant United States Attorney for the Southern District of Florida. In 1981, he returned to Britton Cohen Kaufman & Schantz, where he represented debtors, creditors and trustees in bankruptcy proceedings.

In 1983, he moved to Denver to join the firm of Holme Roberts & Owens where he continued his bankruptcy practice representing United Bank of Colorado and large corporate debtors in their Chapter 11 proceedings. He became a partner at Holme Roberts in January 1986.

Hyman became a judge of the U.S. bankruptcy court for the Southern District of Florida in 2003. On addition to his tenure on the bankruptcy court, Hyman is the co-chairperson of the Bankruptcy Judicial Liaison Committee and as a member of the Business Law Section's executive council and the Archives and History Committee of the Florida Bar for approximately 15 years.

On January 3, 2018, Hyman retired from the bankruptcy court bench. In 2018, the Judicial Council and Chief Bankruptcy Judge Laurel M. Isicoff gave Hyman a three-year term as a recalled bankruptcy judge, effective January 4, 2018, for the purpose of conducting settlement conferences.

== Personal life ==
Hyman was married to Judy Hyman, an attorney who died in 2010. He has two children.

Hyman later married TV commentator and Legal Analyst Kelly Hyman, a former actress.
