= Firebush =

Firebush is a common name for several plants and may refer to:

- Aronia arbutifolia
- Croton lucidus
- Embothrium coccineum (Chilean firebush)
- Euonymus alatus
- Hamelia patens
- Bassia scoparia (Mexican firebush)
