= Nancy Chemtob =

American lawyer

- Born: Nancy Ruthanne Nadel; April 2, 1965 (age 61); Long Island, New York, U.S.
- Education: Syracuse University; University of Miami School of Law (JD)
- Occupation: Attorney
- Spouses: Roland Chemtob (m. 1993) Michael Kubin (m. 2018)
- Children: 3

Nancy Nadel Chemtob (born Nancy Ruthanne Nadel; April 2, 1965) is an American family law attorney specializing in divorces of high-net-worth clients. She is the founder and partner of the law firm Chemtob, Moss, Forman & Beyda LLP.

== Early life ==
Chemtob was born on Long Island to a Jewish family. She graduated from Syracuse University in 1987, and received her Juris Doctor from University of Miami School of Law in 1990.

== Career ==
Chemtob opened her practice in 1997 and Susan Moss, who represented an opposing party in a previous divorce case, joined her in 2002. In 2009, Chemtob represented a woman in the first same-sex divorce in New York history, before same-sex marriage had been legalized in New York state itself. (Note: At the time, New York recognized legally performed same-sex marriages that occurred in other states, while a law had been proposed to legalize it in New York.) Among others, Chemtob represented Mary-Kate Olsen in her pandemic-era divorce from Olivier Sarkozy, Tory Burch, Annette Lauer, Bobby Flay, Star Jones, Diandra Douglas and Louis CK. Chemtob said she had received a record number of high-profile clients during the COVID-19 pandemic.

Chemtob, Moss, Forman & Beyda LLP was listed among the America's Best Law Firms by U.S. News & World Report in its 2022 edition. She has been profiled in The Financial Times, Town & Country, The New York Times, Hamptons Magazine, and The New Yorker.

== Personal life ==
Chemtob has three sons and three stepsons, and lives in New York City and East Hampton, New York. She met her first husband, Roland Chemtob, in 1985 (m.1993). She married her second husband, media entrepreneur Michael Kubin, in 2018.
