= Palm Beach County Canvassing Board v. Harris (Harris I) =

Lawsuit pertaining to the 2000 US Election

Palm Beach County Canvassing Board v. Harris (Harris I) was a lawsuit pertaining to the 2000 United States presidential election.

== Lawsuit ==
There were two main issues:

- Whether the county canvassing boards' authority to conduct manual recounts to correct "errors in the vote tabulation" extended to efforts to remedy situations where machines, though perhaps correctly functioning to detect properly marked ballots, did not count votes on certain ballots on which votes might be found under a manual inspection with an "intent of the voter" standard (Harris had ruled that it did not); and
- How such recounts in the case at hand could be made to fit into the statutory scheme, which, as Harris interpreted it, contemplated a quick certification followed, if necessary, by an election contest during which a court (rather than the canvassing boards) would be empowered to correct errors.

Regarding the first issue, the court ruled that, while Harris was generally entitled to deference in her interpretation of state laws, in this case the interpretation "contravene[d] the plain meaning" of the phrase "error in the vote tabulation" and so must be overturned.

Regarding the second issue, the court ruled that the statutory scheme must be interpreted in light of the Florida state constitution's declaration that "all political power is inherent in the people," with any ambiguities therefore construed "liberally." Preventing the canvassing boards from continuing to conduct recounts beyond the seven-day timeframe (specified in the law, but with ambiguity as to how firm it was intended to be), would "summarily disenfranchise innocent electors [voters]" and could not be allowed unless the recounts continued for so long as to "compromise the integrity of the electoral process." The court ordered counties to submit returns by November 26, until which time the stay of certification would stand.
