= Joseph A. Boyd Jr. =

American judge

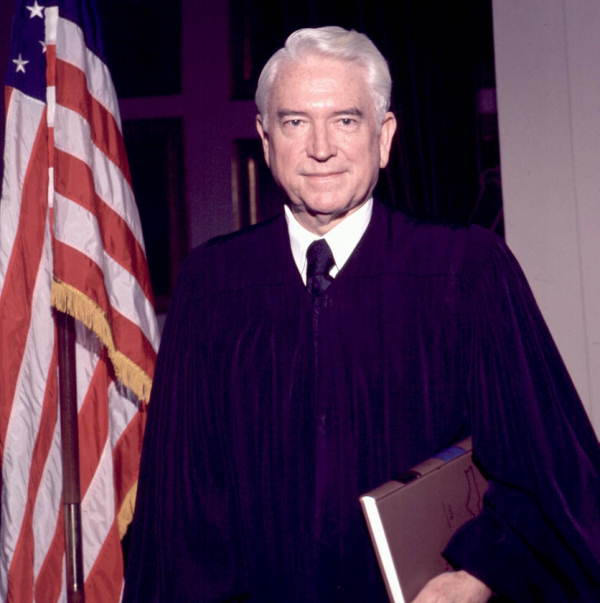
- Born: November 16, 1916; Hoschton, Georgia, U.S.
- Died: October 26, 2007 (aged 90); Tallahassee, Florida, U.S.
- Military career
- Allegiance: United States
- Branch: United States Marine Corps
- Conflicts: World War II
- Other work: politician and a jurist in Florida, 59th Justice of the Florida Supreme Court and later served as its Chief Justice

Joseph A. Boyd Jr. (November 16, 1916 – October 26, 2007) was a politician and a jurist in Florida. He was the 59th Justice of the Florida Supreme Court and later served as its Chief Justice.

== Career ==
Boyd came to Florida in 1939. He served in the United States Marine Corps during World War II and later graduated from the University of Miami School of Law in 1948.

He then became the City Attorney for Hialeah, Florida. He was elected to the Dade County Commission in 1958 and was re-elected in 1962 and 1965. He served as chairman of the commission and vice mayor of Dade County. Justice Boyd served 18 years on the Florida Supreme Court through 1987. He was chief justice from mid-1984 through mid-1986.

== Reprimand ==
Boyd was reprimanded by his fellow justices in the mid-1970s for accepting a secret draft opinion from utility company lawyers. The Florida House of Representatives also investigated but declined to impeach him in 1975, after he agreed to take a psychiatric exam. He is famous for later boasting that he was the only officeholder in Tallahassee to be certified sane.

== Legacy ==
When he retired, Boyd said he would like most to be remembered for his dissents to opinions that later were overturned by the U.S. Supreme Court. One of those cases was when he disagreed with the majority of the justices who ordered the Miami Herald to give equal access on its editorial pages to a political candidate. The federal justices, though, agreed with Boyd and ruled that would violate the First Amendment's freedom of the press protections.

He also once used Biblical logic in dissenting from a ruling that upheld Florida's vagrancy law. Boyd later said he believed that if Jerusalem had such a law, all the prophets, Old and New Testament, would have been jailed. The U.S. Supreme Court again agreed with him and struck down the vagrancy law.
