= R. Fred Lewis =

American judge (1947–2026)

Chief Justice of the Florida Supreme Court
- In office July 1, 2006 – June 30, 2008
- Preceded by: Barbara Pariente
- Succeeded by: Peggy Quince

Justice of the Supreme Court of Florida
- In office December 7, 1998 – January 8, 2019
- Appointed by: Lawton Chiles
- Preceded by: Gerald Kogan
- Succeeded by: Barbara Lagoa

Personal details
- Born: Richard Fred Lewis; December 14, 1947 Beckley, West Virginia, U.S.
- Died: May 26, 2026 (aged 78)
- Spouse: Judith Lewis
- Education: Florida Southern College (BA); University of Miami (JD)
- Website: https://www.floridasupremecourt.org/Justices/Former-Justices/Justice-R.-Fred-Lewis

Richard Fred Lewis (December 14, 1947 – May 26, 2026) was an American judge who was appointed to the Supreme Court of Florida on December 7, 1998, and served until January 8, 2019.

As chief justice, he convened the first commission and statewide all-branch mental health summit which developed a comprehensive plan to address the increasing problems between mental illness and the justice system.

== Early life and education ==
Lewis was born on December 14, 1947, to a coal mining family in the coal mining area of Beckley, West Virginia. He attended Woodrow Wilson High School, where he was actively involved in both athletic and academic pursuits, served as president of the student body, received all-state and all-American recognition for athletic achievement and received the Pete George Memorial award as the outstanding scholar athlete. Lewis maintained a jar of coal and his grandfather's miner's carbide light on his desk to honor his family.

He came to Florida in 1965 to attend Florida Southern College in Lakeland, Florida, a small religious school which stressed religion and family values, where he excelled in athletics and academics. He was elected president of the sophomore, junior, and senior classes and in 1969 was selected honor walk student, which is awarded annually to the outstanding senior student for scholastic and service achievements. He is a member of the college's hall of fame.

Lewis graduated from college cum laude in 1969 and was awarded the NCAA post-graduate grant as one of the top fifteen scholar athletes in the United States. He also received the Besser Lindsey award as one of the top ten male university students in the United States, awarded by Sigma Alpha Epsilon.

Among his other achievements were the Williams Memorial Outstanding Athlete award and inclusion in the Outstanding Athletes in America, National Student Register, Order of Omega, Omicron Delta Kappa, Psi Chi, Political Union, and the Greek Hall of Fame.

Upon graduating from college, Lewis moved to Miami to attend the University of Miami School of Law, where he graduated third in his class, cum laude, in 1972. He was a member of the University of Miami Law Review and was an officer in the student bar association. Selected as a justice of the law school honor council, Lewis also served on the appellate moot court teams. He was inducted into the Iron Arrow Honor Society, the University of Miami's highest honor society, and was awarded membership in Bar and Gavel and Order of Barristers.

== Career ==
Following graduation from law school, Lewis attended and graduated from the United States Army A.G. School after acting as commander of the corps of cadets for the University of Miami ROTC program. He graduated as its top student, receiving the Order of World Wars superior achievement honor. Upon discharge from the military, Lewis entered private practice in Miami, specializing in civil trial and appellate litigation. He left practice upon his appointment to the Florida supreme court, effective January 1, 1999.

Selected as Florida's citizen of the year in 2001, by the Florida Council, Lewis was heavily involved in children's issues, serving as a member of the board of directors of Miami Children's Hospital and many of its committees and panels. While in private practice, he helped provide counseling to families with disabled children and provided pro bono legal services and counseling for cancer patients seeking proper treatment for multiple conditions. In 2001, he also received the "everyday hero" award for his outstanding contributions to community service in Florida.

== Personal life ==
Lewis and his wife Judy attended Florida Southern College together, and were married in 1969. They had two children, Elle and Lindsay. He died on May 26, 2026, at the age of 78.

== Service and awards ==
Lewis served the Florida Bar Association as inventory attorney, spending many hours auditing and reviewing files for the protection of clients. He authored materials published by the Florida bar's continuing legal education program and participated in numerous cases selected for annotation in The American Law Report.

In 1972, Lewis was inducted into the Iron Arrow Honor Society, the highest honor bestowed at the University of Miami.

As an emeritus member of the Tallahassee American Inn of Court, in 1999, Lewis received the Friends of Justice award from the American Board of Trial Advocates for his dedication and service to the citizens of Florida. In 2001, Lewis also received the Public Trust and Confidence award from the Florida Law Related Education Association. He served on Florida's Commission on the Legal Needs of Children. In 2002, the University of Central Florida honored Lewis by creating the Justice R. Fred Lewis award, which is awarded annually to an individual who has demonstrated the highest level of social responsibility. Lewis received the inaugural award for his service to the youth of Florida. He also received the 2005 Great American, Law in Education award, the 2006 Guardian of The Constitution award, and the 2006 Education for Democracy award.

While serving as chief justice, he founded the Justice Teaching Institute, an organization that has over 3,900 volunteer lawyers and judges in all Florida public schools, to enhance civic and law-related education.

In 2007, Lewis was named Florida jurist of the year by the Florida chapters of the American Board of Trial Advocates and selected for Florida's children's cabinet. He also received the ABA 2007 Pursuit of Justice award, and the outstanding citizen award for 2007 from the Florida Council for Social Studies. In 2008, he received the Judge Mario Goderich award from the Cuban American Bar Association, which recognized his work for diversity. He also received a resolution by the Florida Alliance for Assistive Services & Technology for his work to provide access for persons with disabilities. Lewis received the Gracias award 2008 from the Broward County Hispanic Bar, on June 7, 2008. The award reads "For achieving monumental heights in public services and promoting diversity."

In June 2008, Lewis received the William M. Hoeveler Judicial award representing the highest level of professionalism in the Florida judicial system. He was selected as the recipient of the Joe Oldmixon Service award for outstanding service to people with disabilities 2007-2008 (presented by the Center for Independent Living Disability Resource Center). In 2009 he received the We the People constitution education award from the Florida Law Related Education Association, Inc.

As a member of the Florida Supreme Court, Lewis served as liaison to the Florida Board of Bar Examiners and the judicial management council. He has served on the committee on the rules of civil procedure, the committee on standard civil jury instructions, and the code and rules of evidence committee. Lewis was a volunteer in the Florida Law Related Education program working with Florida teachers and students. He was involved in a program of actively teaching and working in schools throughout Florida to promote a better understanding of government institutions and providing open access to judicial officers.

In 2000, he was awarded an honorary doctor of public service degree from Florida Southern College. In 2002, Lewis received an honorary doctor of law degree from St. Thomas University. He also has been the recipient of a certificate of appreciation for outstanding contributions to We the People, the Citizens and the Constitution; a Florida State University College of Law award for contributions to the summer law program; a Guardian of the Constitution citizenship award for law-related education in Brevard County; a Dade County Bar Association, young lawyer's section dedication to children award; and an award for outstanding contributions to the study of law, legal and public affairs, by Miami Senior High School. He also received the 2005-2006 Easter Seals Judge Wilke Ferguson award for protector of the disabled.

In 2007, Lewis received the Equal Opportunities in the Judiciary award, the Constitutional Education award, the Education for Justice award, and the Justice Thurgood Marshall award.

== Causes ==
Lewis attempted to provide greater public access to justice for the disabled by mandating a survey and audit of all court facilities in Florida through a task force of professionals to identify and remove obstacles to court facility access. While chief justice, Lewis also instituted for the first time in Florida, a uniform high-level diversity training program for all Florida judges. Having a background in civil litigation and recognizing the need for better jury instructions in complex cases, he created and appointed the first standard jury instruction committee for contract and business cases, a group that continues to move forward to finalize comprehensive jury instructions for these complex cases. Serving on the first "Children's Cabinet," he led efforts to improve the lives of Florida children.

He served as liaison to the Florida Board of Bar Examiners for 10 years where he led the effort to require higher academic and character standards for applicants to the Florida Bar. He also led the effort to restructure the background fitness analysis process for Chapter 11— certified legal interns. Lewis later served as chair of the Florida Professionalism Commission.
