= Major B. Harding =

American judge

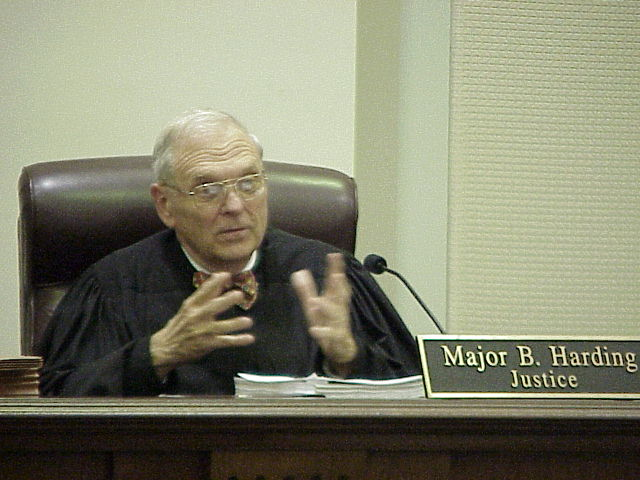
Harding during hearings relating to the 2000 United States presidential election recount in Florida

Major Best Harding (born October 13, 1935) is an attorney and former Chief Justice of the Florida Supreme Court. He was appointed to the court by Governor Lawton Chiles in 1991 and served until 2002. His tenure as chief justice lasted from 1998 to June 2000. Prior to being appointed to the Florida Supreme Court, Harding served as a circuit judge for Florida's Fourth Judicial Circuit and as a Duval County juvenile court judge.

In 2014, Florida State University appointed him to adjudicate the disciplinary hearing of Florida State quarterback Jameis Winston concerning allegations that Winston violated the university's Student Conduct Code.

Harding received his undergraduate and law degrees from Wake Forest University. He also holds a Master of Laws in Judicial Process from the University of Virginia.

After stepping down from the Supreme Court, Harding practiced law as a shareholder of the Ausley McMullen firm in Tallahassee, Florida. He retired from the firm in 2021.
