= 2000 term opinions of the Supreme Court of the United States =

October 2000 to October 2001 opinions

The 2000 term of the Supreme Court of the United States began October 2, 2000, and concluded September 30, 2001. The table illustrates which opinion was filed by each justice in each case and which justices joined each opinion.

== Table key ==
Delivered the court's opinion

Joined the court's opinion

Filed a concurrence

Joined a concurrence

Filed a dissent

Joined a dissent

Filed a concurrence/dissent

Joined a concurrence/dissent

Did not participate in the decision
- Decisions that do not note an argument date were decided without oral argument. Decisions that do not note a justice delivering the court's opinion are per curiam.
- Multiple concurrences and dissents within a case are numbered, with joining votes numbered accordingly. Justices frequently join multiple opinions in a single case; each vote is subdivided accordingly.
- An asterisk ( * ) in the court's opinion denotes that it was only a majority in part or a plurality. An asterisk in a joining vote denotes that the justice joined it only in part.
- A dash ( - ) denotes that the justice voted without filing or joining an opinion.

== 2000 term opinions ==
#	Case name and citation	Argued	Decided	Rehnquist	Stevens	O'Connor	Scalia	Kennedy	Souter	Thomas	Ginsburg	Breyer
1	Artuz v. Bennett, 531 U.S. 4	October 10, 2000	November 7, 2000									
2	Cleveland v. United States, 531 U.S. 12	October 10, 2000	November 7, 2000									
3	Sinkfield v. Kelley, 531 U.S. 28		November 27, 2000									
4	Indianapolis v. Edmond, 531 U.S. 32	October 3, 2000	November 28, 2000	1			1*			1 / 2		
5	Eastern Associated Coal Corp. v. Mine Workers, 531 U.S. 57	October 2, 2000	November 28, 2000									
6	Bush v. Palm Beach County Canvassing Bd., 531 U.S. 70	December 1, 2000	December 4, 2000									
7	Green Tree Financial Corp.-Ala. v. Randolph, 531 U.S. 79	October 3, 2000	December 11, 2000		*				*		*	* / *
8	Bush v. Gore, 531 U.S. 98	December 11, 2000	December 12, 2000		1 / 2* / 3 / 4*				2 / 3* / 4*		1 / 2* / 3 / 4*	1 / 2 / 3* / 4
9	Solid Waste Agency of Northern Cook Cty. v. Army Corps of Engineers, 531 U.S. 159	October 31, 2000	January 9, 2001									
10	Glover v. United States, 531 U.S. 198	November 27, 2000	January 9, 2001									
11	Gitlitz v. Commissioner, 531 U.S. 206	November 27, 2000	January 9, 2001									
12	Fiore v. White, 531 U.S. 225		January 9, 2001									
13	Lopez v. Davis, 531 U.S. 230	October 30, 2000	January 10, 2001									
14	Seling v. Young, 531 U.S. 250	October 31, 2000	January 17, 2001				1		1	2		
15	City News & Novelty, Inc. v. Waukesha, 531 U.S. 278	November 28, 2000	January 17, 2001									
16	District of Columbia v. Tri County Industries, Inc., 531 U.S. 287	January 10, 2001	January 17, 2001									
17	Brentwood Academy v. Tennessee Secondary School Athletic Assn., 531 U.S. 288	October 11, 2000	February 20, 2001									
18	Director of Revenue of Mo. v. CoBank ACB, 531 U.S. 316	November 28, 2000	February 20, 2001									
19	Illinois v. McArthur, 531 U.S. 326	November 1, 2000	February 20, 2001									
20	Buckman Co. v. Plaintiffs' Legal Comm., 531 U.S. 341	December 4, 2000	February 21, 2001									
21	Board of Trustees of Univ. of Ala. v. Garrett, 531 U.S. 356	October 11, 2000	February 21, 2001									
22	Central Green Co. v. United States, 531 U.S. 425	October 30, 2000	February 21, 2001									
23	Lewis v. Lewis & Clark Marine, Inc., 531 U.S. 438	November 29, 2000	February 21, 2001									
24	Whitman v. American Trucking Assns., Inc., 531 U.S. 457	November 7, 2000	February 27, 2001		* / 1				* / 1	2		* / 3
25	Semtek Int'l Inc. v. Lockheed Martin Corp., 531 U.S. 497	December 5, 2000	February 27, 2001									
26	Cook v. Gralike, 531 U.S. 510	November 6, 2000	February 28, 2001	1				2	*	* / 3		
27	Legal Services Corp. v. Velazquez, 531 U.S. 533	October 4, 2000	February 28, 2001									
28	Department of Interior v. Klamath Water Users Protective Assn., 532 U.S. 1	January 10, 2001	March 5, 2001									
29	Ohio v. Reiner, 532 U.S. 17		March 19, 2001									
30	TrafFix Devices, Inc. v. Marketing Displays, Inc., 532 U.S. 23	November 29, 2000	March 20, 2001									
31	Shafer v. South Carolina, 532 U.S. 36	January 9, 2001	March 20, 2001				1			2		
32	Buford v. United States, 532 U.S. 59	January 8, 2001	March 20, 2001									
33	Ferguson v. City of Charleston, 532 U.S. 67	October 4, 2000	March 21, 2001	*						*		
34	Circuit City Stores, Inc. v. Adams, 532 U.S. 105	November 6, 2000	March 21, 2001		1 / 2				1* / 2		1 / 2	1 / 2
35	Egelhoff v. Egelhoff, 532 U.S. 141	November 8, 2000	March 21, 2001									
36	Texas v. Cobb, 532 U.S. 162	January 16, 2001	April 2, 2001									
37	Lujan v. G & G Fire Sprinklers, Inc., 532 U.S. 189	February 26, 2001	April 17, 2001									
38	United States v. Cleveland Indians Baseball Co., 532 U.S. 200	February 27, 2001	April 17, 2001									
39	Shaw v. Murphy, 532 U.S. 223	January 16, 2001	April 18, 2001									
40	Easley v. Cromartie, 532 U.S. 234	November 27, 2000	April 18, 2001									
41	Clark County School Dist. v. Breeden, 532 U.S. 268		April 23, 2001									
42	Alexander v. Sandoval, 532 U.S. 275	January 16, 2001	April 24, 2001									
43	Atwater v. Lago Vista, 532 U.S. 318	December 4, 2000	April 24, 2001									
44	Daniels v. United States, 532 U.S. 374	January 8, 2001	April 25, 2001		1	*	*		1		1	2
45	Lackawanna County District Attorney v. Coss, 532 U.S. 394	February 20, 2001	April 25, 2001		1	*	*		1		1	2
46	C & L Enterprises, Inc. v. Citizen Band of Potawatomi Tribe of Okla., 532 U.S. 411	March 19, 2001	April 30, 2001									
47	Cooper Industries, Inc. v. Leatherman Tool Group, Inc., 532 U.S. 424	February 26, 2001	May 14, 2001				1			2		
48	Rogers v. Tennessee, 532 U.S. 451	November 1, 2000	May 14, 2001		1 / 2		2			2		2* / 3
49	United States v. Oakland Cannabis Buyers' Cooperative, 532 U.S. 483	March 28, 2001	May 14, 2001									
50	Major League Baseball Players Assn. v. Garvey, 532 U.S. 504		May 14, 2001									
51	Bartnicki v. Vopper, 532 U.S. 514	December 5, 2000	May 21, 2001									
52	United States v. Hatter, 532 U.S. 557	February 20, 2001	May 21, 2001				* / 1			2		
53	Wharf (Holdings) Ltd. v. United Int'l Holdings, Inc., 532 U.S. 588	March 21, 2001	May 21, 2001									
54	Buckhannon Bd. & Care Home v. WV Dept. of Health and Human Resources, 532 U.S. 598	February 27, 2001	May 29, 2001									
55	Atkinson Trading Co. v. Shirley, 532 U.S. 645	March 27, 2001	May 29, 2001									
56	PGA TOUR, Inc. v. Martin, 532 U.S. 661	January 17, 2001	May 29, 2001									
57	NLRB v. Kentucky River Community Care, Inc., 532 U.S. 706	February 21, 2001	May 29, 2001		*				*		*	*
58	Booth v. Churner, 532 U.S. 731	March 20, 2001	May 29, 2001									
59	New Hampshire v. Maine, 532 U.S. 742	April 16, 2001	May 29, 2001									
60	Becker v. Montgomery, 532 U.S. 757	April 16, 2001	May 29, 2001									
61	Arkansas v. Sullivan, 532 U.S. 769		May 29, 2001									
62	Florida v. Thomas, 532 U.S. 774	April 25, 2001	June 4, 2001									
63	Penry v. Johnson, 532 U.S. 782	March 27, 2001	June 4, 2001	*			*			*		
64	Norfolk Shipbuilding & Drylock Corp. v. Garris, 532 U.S. 811	April 18, 2001	June 4, 2001						*		*	*
65	United Dominion Industries, Inc. v. United States, 532 U.S. 822	March 26, 2001	June 4, 2001									
66	Pollard v. E. I. DuPont de Nemours & Co., 532 U.S. 843	April 23, 2001	June 4, 2001									
67	Kansas v. Colorado, 533 U.S. 1	March 19, 2001	June 11, 2001			*	*			*		
68	Kyllo v. United States, 533 U.S. 27	February 20, 2001	June 11, 2001									
69	Tuan Anh Nguyen v. INS, 533 U.S. 53	January 9, 2001	June 11, 2001									
70	Good News Club v. Milford Central School, 533 U.S. 98	February 28, 2001	June 11, 2001		1		1		2		2	* / 2
71	Alabama v. Bozeman, 533 U.S. 146	April 17, 2001	June 11, 2001				*			*		
72	Cedric Kushner Promotions, Ltd. v. King, 533 U.S. 158	April 18, 2001	June 11, 2001									
73	Duncan v. Walker, 533 U.S. 167	March 26, 2001	June 18, 2001		1				1 / 2			
74	Saucier v. Katz, 533 U.S. 194	March 20, 2001	June 18, 2001						*			
75	United States v. Mead Corp., 533 U.S. 218	November 8, 2000	June 18, 2001									
76	Idaho v. United States, 533 U.S. 262	April 23, 2001	June 18, 2001									
77	INS v. St. Cyr, 533 U.S. 289	April 24, 2001	June 25, 2001	2		1 / 2*	2			2		
78	Calcano-Martinez v. INS, 533 U.S. 348	April 24, 2001	June 25, 2001	2		1	2			2		
79	Nevada v. Hicks, 533 U.S. 353	March 21, 2001	June 25, 2001		1 / 2	2		3	3	3	4	1 / 2
80	United States v. United Foods, Inc., 533 U.S. 405	April 17, 2001	June 25, 2001		1	*				2		
81	Federal Election Comm'n v. Colorado Republican Federal Campaign Comm., 533 U.S. 431	February 28, 2001	June 25, 2001	*								
82	New York Times Co. v. Tasini, 533 U.S. 483	March 28, 2001	June 25, 2001									
83	Lorillard Tobacco Co. v. Reilly, 533 U.S. 525	April 25, 2001	June 28, 2001		* / 1		* / 1	* / 1	* / 1* / 2	* / 2	* / 1	* / 1
84	Palazzolo v. Rhode Island, 533 U.S. 606	February 26, 2001	June 28, 2001		*	1	2		1		1	1 / 2
85	Tyler v. Cain, 533 U.S. 656	April 16, 2001	June 28, 2001									
86	Zadvydas v. Davis, 533 U.S. 678	February 21, 2001	June 28, 2001	2			1 / 2*	2		1 / 2*		
#	Case name and citation	Argued	Decided	Rehnquist	Stevens	O'Connor	Scalia	Kennedy	Souter	Thomas	Ginsburg	Breyer

== 2000 term membership and statistics ==
This was the fifteenth term of Chief Justice Rehnquist's tenure, and the seventh consecutive term in which the Court's membership had not changed.

Justice		Appointment history		Agreement with judgment		Opinions filed				
Seniority	Name	President	Date confirmed	%	#					Total
Chief Justice	William Rehnquist	Richard Nixon	January 7, 1972	83.7%	72/86	9	2	0	3	14
Associate Justice	John Paul Stevens	Gerald Ford	December 19, 1975	70.9%	61/86	9	6	3	13	31
Associate Justice	Sandra Day O'Connor	Ronald Reagan	September 25, 1981	90.5%	76/84	9	3	1	4	17
Associate Justice	Antonin Scalia	Ronald Reagan	September 26, 1986	79.1%	68/86	8	10	1	9	28
Associate Justice	Anthony Kennedy	Ronald Reagan	February 18, 1988	91.9%	79/86	9	5	0	1	15
Associate Justice	David Souter	George H. W. Bush	October 9, 1990	80%	68/85	8	4	2	5	19
Associate Justice	Clarence Thomas	George H. W. Bush	October 23, 1991	80.2%	69/86	7	7	2	5	21
Associate Justice	Ruth Bader Ginsburg	Bill Clinton	August 10, 1993	76.7%	66/86	9	6	1	4	20
Associate Justice	Stephen Breyer	Bill Clinton	August 3, 1994	74.1%	63/85	9	3	0	12	24
Notes on statistics: Opinion counts only include the bench opinions listed above; opinions relating to orders or in-chambers opinions are not included.; Agreement with the Court's judgment does not guarantee agreement with the reasoning expressed in its opinion. A justice is not considered in agreement if they dissented even in part. Agreement percentages are based only on the listed cases in which a justice participated and are rounded to the nearest one-tenth of one percentage point.						Totals				
Notes on statistics: Opinion counts only include the bench opinions listed above; opinions relating to orders or in-chambers opinions are not included.; Agreement with the Court's judgment does not guarantee agreement with the reasoning expressed in its opinion. A justice is not considered in agreement if they dissented even in part. Agreement percentages are based only on the listed cases in which a justice participated and are rounded to the nearest one-tenth of one percentage point.						77	46	10	56	189
