= 2000 term United States Supreme Court opinions of Antonin Scalia =

The 2000 term of the Supreme Court of the United States began October 2, 2000, and concluded September 30, 2001. This was the fifteenth term of Associate Justice Antonin Scalia's tenure on the Court.
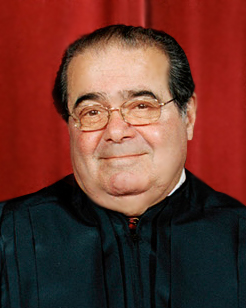

Antonin Scalia 2000 term statistics

8	Majority or plurality	11	Concurrence	0	Other
9	Dissent	1	Concurrence/dissent	Total =	29
Bench opinions = 28		Opinions relating to orders = 1		In-chambers opinions = 0
Unanimous opinions: 2		Most joined by: Thomas (18)		Least joined by: Stevens (6)

Type	Case	Citation	Issues	Joined by	Other opinions
	Artuz v. Bennett	531 U.S. 4 (2000)		Unanimous	
	Eastern Associated Coal Corp. v. Mine Workers	531 U.S. 57 (2000)		Thomas	
	Seling v. Young	531 U.S. 250 (2001)		Souter	
	Whitman v. American Trucking Assns., Inc.	531 U.S. 457 (2001)		Rehnquist, O'Connor, Kennedy, Thomas, Ginsburg; Stevens, Souter, Breyer (in part)	
	Semtek Int'l Inc. v. Lockheed Martin Corp.	531 U.S. 497 (2001)		Unanimous	
	Legal Services Corp. v. Velazquez	531 U.S. 533 (2001)		Rehnquist, O'Connor, Thomas	
	Bush v. Gore	531 U.S. 1046 (2001)			
Scalia concurred in the Court's granting of a stay and of certiorari.
	Shafer v. South Carolina	532 U.S. 36 (2001)			
	Ferguson v. Charleston	532 U.S. 67 (2001)		Rehnquist, Thomas (in part)	
	Egelhoff v. Egelhoff	532 U.S. 141 (2001)		Ginsburg	
	United States v. Cleveland Indians Baseball Co.	532 U.S. 200 (2001)			
	Alexander v. Sandoval	532 U.S. 275 (2001)		Rehnquist, O'Connor, Kennedy, Thomas	
	Daniels v. United States	532 U.S. 374 (2001)			
	Cooper Industries, Inc. v. Leatherman Tool Group, Inc.	532 U.S. 424 (2001)			
	Rogers v. Tennessee	532 U.S. 451 (2001)		Stevens, Thomas; Breyer (in part)	
	United States v. Hatter	532 U.S. 557 (2001)			
	Buckhannon Board & Care Home, Inc. v. West Virginia Dept. of Health and Human Resources	532 U.S. 598 (2001)		Thomas	
	PGA TOUR, Inc. v. Martin	532 U.S. 661 (2001)		Thomas	
	NLRB v. Kentucky River Community Care, Inc.	532 U.S. 706 (2001)		Rehnquist, O'Connor, Kennedy, Thomas; Stevens, Souter, Ginsburg, Breyer (in part)	
	Norfolk Shipbuilding & Drylock Corp. v. Garris	532 U.S. 811 (2001)		Rehnquist, Stevens, O'Connor, Kennedy, Thomas; Souter, Ginsburg, Breyer (in part)	
	Kyllo v. United States	533 U.S. 27 (2001)		Souter, Thomas, Ginsburg, Breyer	
	Tuan Anh Nguyen v. INS	533 U.S. 53 (2001)		Thomas	
	Good News Club v. Milford Central School	533 U.S. 98 (2001)			
	United States v. Mead Corp.	533 U.S. 218 (2001)			
	INS v. St. Cyr	533 U.S. 289 (2001)		Rehnquist, O'Connor, Thomas	
	Calcano-Martinez v. INS	533 U.S. 348 (2001)		Rehnquist, Thomas	
	Nevada v. Hicks	533 U.S. 353 (2001)		Rehnquist, Kennedy, Souter, Thomas, Ginsburg	
	Palazzolo v. Rhode Island	533 U.S. 606 (2001)			
	Zadvydas v. Davis	533 U.S. 678 (2001)		Thomas	
