= 2000 term United States Supreme Court opinions of John Paul Stevens =

The 2000 term of the Supreme Court of the United States began October 2, 2000, and concluded September 30, 2001. This was the twenty-sixth term of Associate Justice John Paul Stevens's tenure on the Court.
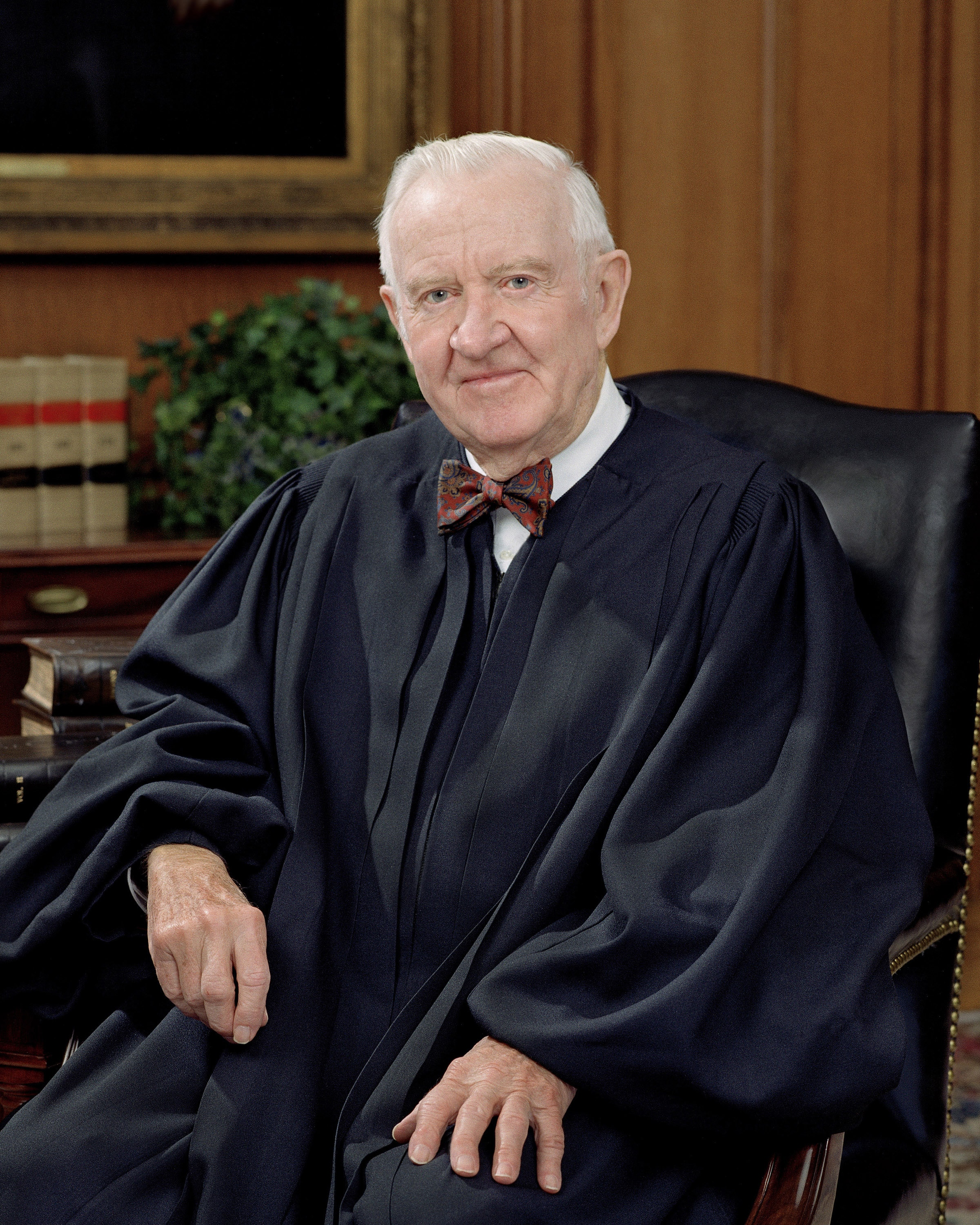

John Paul Stevens 2000 term statistics

| 9 | Majority or plurality | 6 | Concurrence | 2 | Other |
| 14 | Dissent | 3 | Concurrence/dissent | Total = | 34 |
| Bench opinions = 31 | | Opinions relating to orders = 3 | | In-chambers opinions = 0 |
| Unanimous opinions: 1 | | Most joined by: Breyer (19) | | Least joined by: Scalia (3) |

| Type | Case | Citation | Issues | Joined by | Other opinions |
|---|---|---|---|---|---|
| | Bush v. Gore | 531 U.S. 98 (2000) | | Ginsburg, Breyer | |
| | Solid Waste Agency of Northern Cook Cty. v. Army Corps of Engineers | 531 U.S. 159 (2001) | | Souter, Ginsburg, Breyer | |
| | Lopez v. Davis | 531 U.S. 230 (2001) | | Rehnquist, Kennedy | |
| | Seling v. Young | 531 U.S. 250 (2001) | | | |
| | Illinois v. McArthur | 531 U.S. 326 (2001) | | | |
| | Buckman Co. v. Plaintiffs' Legal Comm. | 531 U.S. 341 (2001) | | Thomas | |
| | Central Green Co. v. United States | 531 U.S. 425 (2001) | | Unanimous | |
| | Whitman v. American Trucking Assns., Inc. | 531 U.S. 457 (2001) | | Souter | |
| | Cook v. Gralike | 531 U.S. 510 (2001) | | Scalia, Kennedy, Ginsburg, Breyer; Souter, Thomas (in part) | |
| | Bush v. Gore | 531 U.S. 1046 (2000) | | Souter, Ginsburg, Breyer | |
Stevens dissented from the Court's granting of a stay.
| | Ferguson v. Charleston | 532 U.S. 67 (2001) | | O'Connor, Souter, Ginsburg, Breyer | |
| | Circuit City Stores, Inc. v. Adams | 532 U.S. 105 (2001) | | Ginsburg, Breyer; Souter (in part) | |
| | Alexander v. Sandoval | 532 U.S. 275 (2001) | | Souter, Ginsburg, Breyer | |
| | Cooper Industries, Inc. v. Leatherman Tool Group, Inc. | 532 U.S. 424 (2001) | | Rehnquist, O'Connor, Kennedy, Souter, Thomas, Breyer | |
| | Rogers v. Tennessee | 532 U.S. 451 (2001) | | | |
| | United States v. Oakland Cannabis Buyers' Cooperative | 532 U.S. 483 (2001) | | Souter, Ginsburg | |
| | Major League Baseball Players Assn. v. Garvey | 532 U.S. 504 (2001) | | | |
| | Bartnicki v. Vopper | 532 U.S. 514 (2001) | | O'Connor, Kennedy, Souter, Ginsburg, Breyer | |
| | PGA TOUR, Inc. v. Martin | 532 U.S. 661 (2001) | | Rehnquist, O'Connor, Kennedy, Souter, Ginsburg, Breyer | |
| | NLRB v. Kentucky River Community Care, Inc. | 532 U.S. 706 (2001) | | Souter, Ginsburg, Breyer | |
| | United Dominion Industries, Inc. v. United States | 532 U.S. 822 (2001) | | | |
| | In re Workman | 532 U.S. 954 (2001) | | Souter, Breyer | |
Stevens filed a statement regarding the Court's denial of a stay and of a writ of habeas corpus.
| | Elkhart v. Books | 532 U.S. 1058 (2001) | | | |
Stevens filed a statement regarding the Court's denial of certiorari
| | Kansas v. Colorado | 533 U.S. 1 (2001) | | Rehnquist, Kennedy, Thomas, Ginsburg, Breyer; O'Connor, Scalia, Thomas (in part) | |
| | Kyllo v. United States | 533 U.S. 27 (2001) | | Rehnquist, O'Connor, Kennedy | |
| | Good News Club v. Milford Central School | 533 U.S. 98 (2001) | | | |
| | Duncan v. Walker | 533 U.S. 167 (2001) | | Souter | |
| | INS v. St. Cyr | 533 U.S. 289 (2001) | | Kennedy, Souter, Ginsburg, Breyer | |
| | Calcano-Martinez v. INS | 533 U.S. 348 (2001) | | Kennedy, Souter, Ginsburg, Breyer | |
| | Nevada v. Hicks | 533 U.S. 353 (2001) | | Breyer | |
| | United States v. United Foods, Inc. | 533 U.S. 405 (2001) | | | |
| | New York Times Co. v. Tasini | 533 U.S. 483 (2001) | | Breyer | |
| | Lorillard Tobacco Co. v. Reilly | 533 U.S. 525 (2001) | | Ginsburg, Breyer; Souter (in part) | |
| | Palazzolo v. Rhode Island | 533 U.S. 606 (2001) | | | |
