= 2000 term United States Supreme Court opinions of Ruth Bader Ginsburg =

The 2000 term of the Supreme Court of the United States began October 2, 2000, and concluded September 30, 2001. This was the eighth term of Associate Justice Ruth Bader Ginsburg's tenure on the Court.
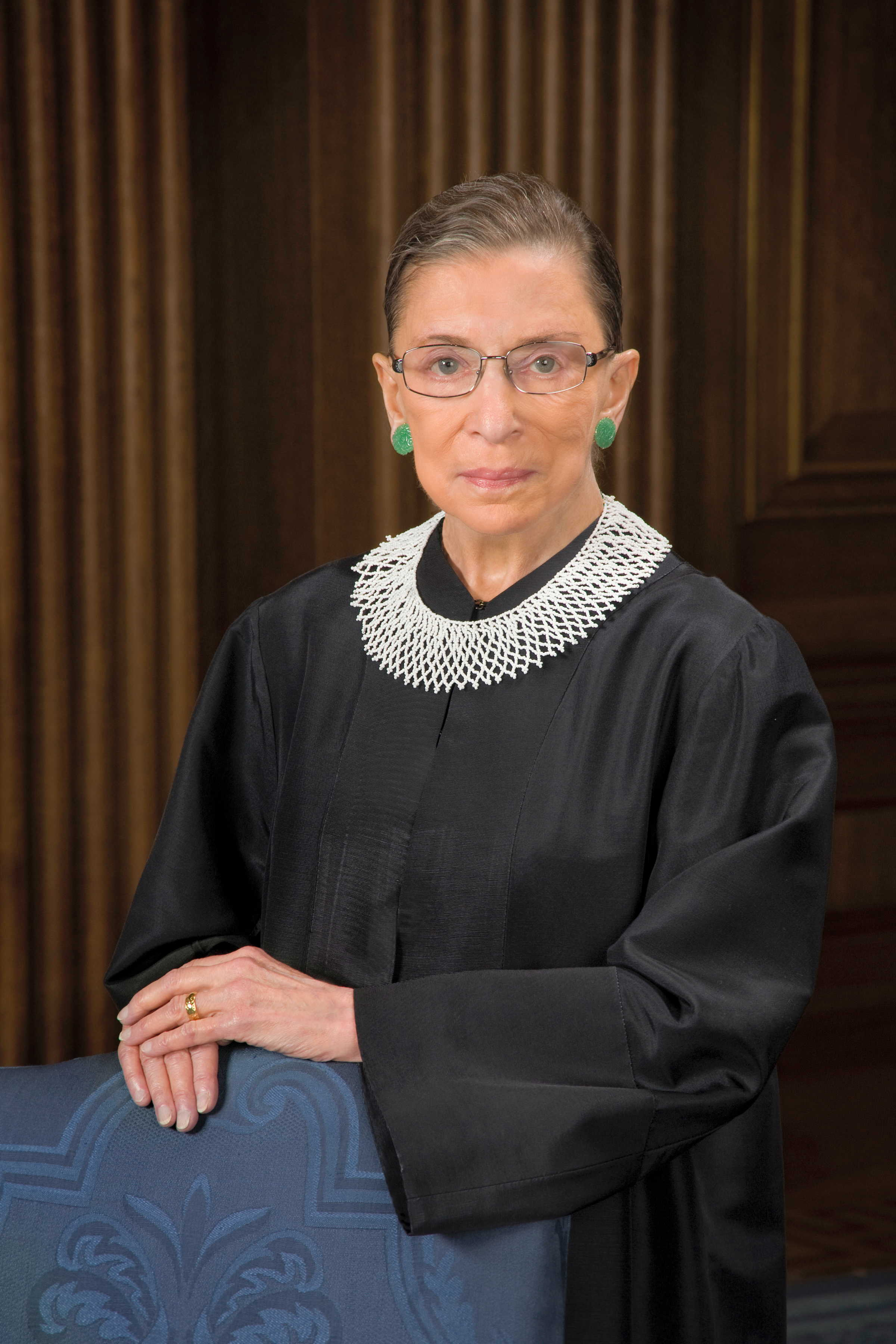

Ruth Bader Ginsburg 2000 term statistics

| 9 | Majority or plurality | 6 | Concurrence | 0 | Other |
| 4 | Dissent | 1 | Concurrence/dissent | Total = | 20 |
| Bench opinions = 20 | | Opinions relating to orders = 0 | | In-chambers opinions = 0 |
| Unanimous opinions: 4 | | Most joined by: Breyer (14) | | Least joined by: Scalia (7) |

| Type | Case | Citation | Issues | Joined by | Other opinions |
|---|---|---|---|---|---|
| | Cleveland v. United States | 531 U.S. 12 (2000) | | Unanimous | |
| | Green Tree Financial Corp.-Ala. v. Randolph | 531 U.S. 79 (2000) | | Stevens, Souter; Breyer (in part) | |
| | Bush v. Gore | 531 U.S. 98 (2000) | | Stevens; Souter, Breyer (in part) | |
| | Lopez v. Davis | 531 U.S. 230 (2001) | | O'Connor, Scalia, Souter, Thomas, Breyer | |
| | City News & Novelty, Inc. v. Waukesha | 531 U.S. 278 (2001) | | Unanimous | |
| | Shafer v. South Carolina | 532 U.S. 36 (2001) | | Rehnquist, Stevens, O'Connor, Kennedy, Souter, Breyer | |
| | United States v. Cleveland Indians Baseball Co. | 532 U.S. 200 (2001) | | Rehnquist, Stevens, O'Connor, Kennedy, Souter, Thomas, Breyer | |
| | Shaw v. Murphy | 532 U.S. 223 (2001) | | | |
| | C & L Enterprises, Inc. v. Citizen Band of Potawatomi Tribe of Okla. | 532 U.S. 411 (2001) | | Unanimous | |
| | Cooper Industries, Inc. v. Leatherman Tool Group, Inc. | 532 U.S. 424 (2001) | | | |
| | Major League Baseball Players Assn. v. Garvey | 532 U.S. 504 (2001) | | | |
| | Buckhannon Board & Care Home, Inc. v. West Virginia Dept. of Health and Human Resources | 532 U.S. 598 (2001) | | Stevens, Souter, Breyer | |
| | New Hampshire v. Maine | 532 U.S. 742 (2001) | | Rehnquist, Stevens, O'Connor, Scalia, Kennedy, Thomas, Breyer | |
| | Becker v. Montgomer | 532 U.S. 757 (2001) | | Unanimous | |
| | Arkansas v. Sullivan | 532 U.S. 769 (2001) | | Stevens, O'Connor, Breyer | |
| | Norfolk Shipbuilding & Drylock Corp. v. Garris | 532 U.S. 811 (2001) | | Souter, Breyer | |
| | Saucier v. Katz | 533 U.S. 194 (2001) | | Stevens, Breyer | |
| | Nevada v. Hicks | 533 U.S. 353 (2001) | | | |
| | New York Times Co. v. Tasini | 533 U.S. 483 (2001) | | Rehnquist, O'Connor, Scalia, Kennedy, Souter, Thomas | |
| | Palazzolo v. Rhode Island | 533 U.S. 606 (2001) | | Souter, Breyer | |
