= 2000 term United States Supreme Court opinions of Anthony Kennedy =

The 2000 term of the Supreme Court of the United States began October 2, 2000, and concluded September 30, 2001. This was the fourteenth term of Associate Justice Anthony Kennedy's tenure on the Court.
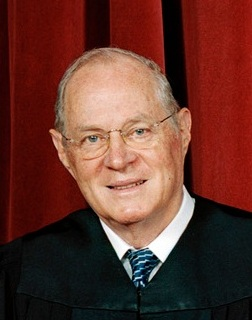

Anthony Kennedy 2000 term statistics

9	Majority or plurality	5	Concurrence	0	Other
1	Dissent	0	Concurrence/dissent	Total =	15
Bench opinions = 15		Opinions relating to orders = 0		In-chambers opinions = 0
Unanimous opinions: 3		Most joined by: Scalia (11)		Least joined by: Ginsburg, Breyer (4)

Type	Case	Citation	Issues	Joined by	Other opinions
	Glover v. United States	531 U.S. 98 (2001)		Unanimous	
	Gitlitz v. Commissioner	531 U.S. 206 (2001)		Unanimous	
	Board of Trustees of the University of Alabama v. Garrett	531 U.S. 356 (2001)		O'Connor	
	Cook v. Gralike	531 U.S. 510 (2001)			
	Legal Services Corp. v. Velazquez	531 U.S. 533 (2001)		Stevens, Souter, Ginsburg, Breyer	
	TrafFix Devices, Inc. v. Marketing Displays, Inc.	532 U.S. 23 (2001)		Unanimous	
	Ferguson v. Charleston	532 U.S. 67 (2001)			
	Circuit City Stores, Inc. v. Adams	532 U.S. 105 (2001)		Rehnquist, O'Connor, Scalia, Thomas	
	Texas v. Cobb	532 U.S. 162 (2001)		Scalia, Thomas	
	Tuan Anh Nguyen v. INS	533 U.S. 53 (2001)		Rehnquist, Stevens, Scalia, Thomas	
	Saucier v. Katz	533 U.S. 194 (2001)		Rehnquist, O'Connor, Scalia, Thomas; Souter (in part)	
	United States v. United Foods, Inc.	533 U.S. 405 (2001)		Rehnquist, Stevens, Scalia, Souter, Thomas	
	Lorillard Tobacco Co. v. Reilly	533 U.S. 525 (2001)		Scalia	
	Palazzolo v. Rhode Island	533 U.S. 606 (2001)		Rehnquist, O'Connor, Scalia, Thomas; Stevens (in part)	
	Zadvydas v. Davis	533 U.S. 678 (2001)		Rehnquist; Scalia, Thomas (in part)	
