= Cleveland v. United States =

Cleveland v. United States is the name for two United States Supreme Court cases.

- Cleveland v. United States (1946), 329 U.S. 14, about polygamy
- Cleveland v. United States (2000), 531 U.S. 12, about mail fraud
