= Cleveland v. United States (1946) =

- Supreme Court of the United States

Argued October 10, 1945 Reargued October 17, 1946 Decided November 18, 1946
- Full case name: Cleveland et al. v. United States
- Citations: 329 U.S. 14 (more) 67 S. Ct. 13; 91 L. Ed. 12; 1946 U.S. LEXIS 1725

Case history
- Prior: 146 F.2d 730 (10th Cir. 1945)

Holding
- Affirmed. Notwithstanding the fact that polygamy is a person's religious belief, the Mann Act prohibits the transportation of women across state lines to participate in polygamy.

Court membership
- Chief Justice Fred M. Vinson Associate Justices Hugo Black · Stanley F. Reed; Felix Frankfurter · William O. Douglas; Frank Murphy · Robert H. Jackson; Wiley B. Rutledge · Harold H. Burton

Case opinions
- Majority: Douglas, joined by Vinson, Black, Reed, Frankfurter, Jackson, Burton
- Concurrence: Rutledge
- Dissent: Murphy

Laws applied
- 18 U.S.C. 398
- Abrogated by
- Child Sexual Abuse & Pornography Act of 1986, Pub. L. No. 99-628, § 5(b)(1), 100 Stat. 3510–11 (in part)

Cleveland v. United States, 329 U.S. 14 (1946), was a case in which the Supreme Court of the United States held that notwithstanding the fact that polygamy is a person's religious belief, the Mann Act prohibits the transportation of women across state lines to participate in polygamy.

== Background ==
Individuals were members of a fundamentalist Mormon sect that practiced polygamy. The individuals were indicted for transporting women across state lines to enter into plural marriages. Following a bench trial, all of the individuals were convicted for violations of the Mann Act. They then appealed their convictions to the U.S. Tenth Circuit Court of Appeals, which affirmed the convictions. The U.S. Supreme Court then granted certiorari to hear the case.

== Opinion of the court ==
Affirmed. Justice William O. Douglas delivered the opinion of the court.

The Court held that transporting a woman or girl across state lines for the purpose of making her a plural wife in a polygamous marriage is a violation of the Mann Act because it is for "an immoral purpose." In explaining its reasoning, the court opined that although the Mann Act was primarily intended to target commercialized white sex slave trade, the phrase "for any other immoral purpose" makes plain that the Act is not so narrowly limited. In noting the historical unlawfulness of polygamy in the United States, the Court found polygamy to be an immoral act of the type contemplated by the Mann Act's prohibitions.

Finally, the Court found that there is no viable defense to the Mann Act by virtue of the religious beliefs that motivate the practice of polygamy.

== Concurring opinion ==
Justice Wiley Blount Rutledge delivered a concurring opinion. Justice Rutledge agreed with the majority's decision insofar as the majority opinion followed the precedent set in Caminetti v. United States. However, Rutledge diverged from the majority view in expressing his opinion that the Caminetti case was wrongly decided, as it improperly expanded the application of the Mann Act beyond the legislators' intent.

== Dissenting opinion ==
Justice Frank Murphy delivered a dissenting opinion, stating that polygamy is not of the same genus as "prostitution and debauchery" as contemplated by the Mann Act.

== See also ==
- Cleveland v. United States, 531 U.S. 12 (2000)
