= Director of Revenue of Missouri v. CoBank ACB =

Director of Revenue of Mo. v. CoBank ACB
- Supreme Court of the United States

Argued November 28, 2000 Decided February 20, 2001
- Full case name: Director of Revenue of Missouri v. Cooperative Bank ACB
- Citations: 531 U.S. 316 (more) 121 S. Ct. 941; 148 L. Ed. 2d 830

Case history
- Prior: Decision against defendant in the Administrative Hearing Commission; reversed sub nom. Production Credit Assn. of Southeastern Mo. v. Director of Revenue 10 S.W.3d 142 (Mo. 2000)
- Subsequent: Administrative Hearing Commission affirmed 43 S.W.3d 311 (Mo. 2001)

Holding
- The National Bank for Cooperatives, which Congress has designated as a federally chartered instrumentality of the United States, is not exempt from state income taxation.

Court membership
- Chief Justice William Rehnquist Associate Justices John P. Stevens · Sandra Day O'Connor; Antonin Scalia · Anthony Kennedy; David Souter · Clarence Thomas; Ruth Bader Ginsburg · Stephen Breyer

Case opinion
- Majority: Thomas, joined by unanimous

Laws applied
- Farm Credit Act, Supremacy Clause

Director of Revenue of Mo. v. CoBank ACB, 531 U.S. 316 (2001), was a United States Supreme Court case decided in 2001. The case concerned whether CoBank is exempt from state income tax requirements. A unanimous Court held that they are not exempt.

== Background ==
The Farm Credit Act of 1933 created various lending institutions, including banks for cooperatives, which are designated as federally chartered instrumentalities of the United States. CoBank ACB is the successor to all rights and obligations of the National Bank for Cooperatives. In 1996, CoBank filed amended returns on behalf of that bank, requesting an exemption from all Missouri corporate income taxes and refunds on the taxes it paid for 1991 through 1994. CoBank asserted that the Supremacy Clause accords federal instrumentalities immunity from state taxation unless Congress has expressly waived this immunity, which the Act did not expressly do. The state of Missouri denied the request, but the Missouri State Supreme Court reversed, stating that because the Act's current version is silent as to the banks' tax immunity, Congress cannot be said to have expressly consented to state income taxation and, thus, the banks are exempt.

== Opinion of the Court ==
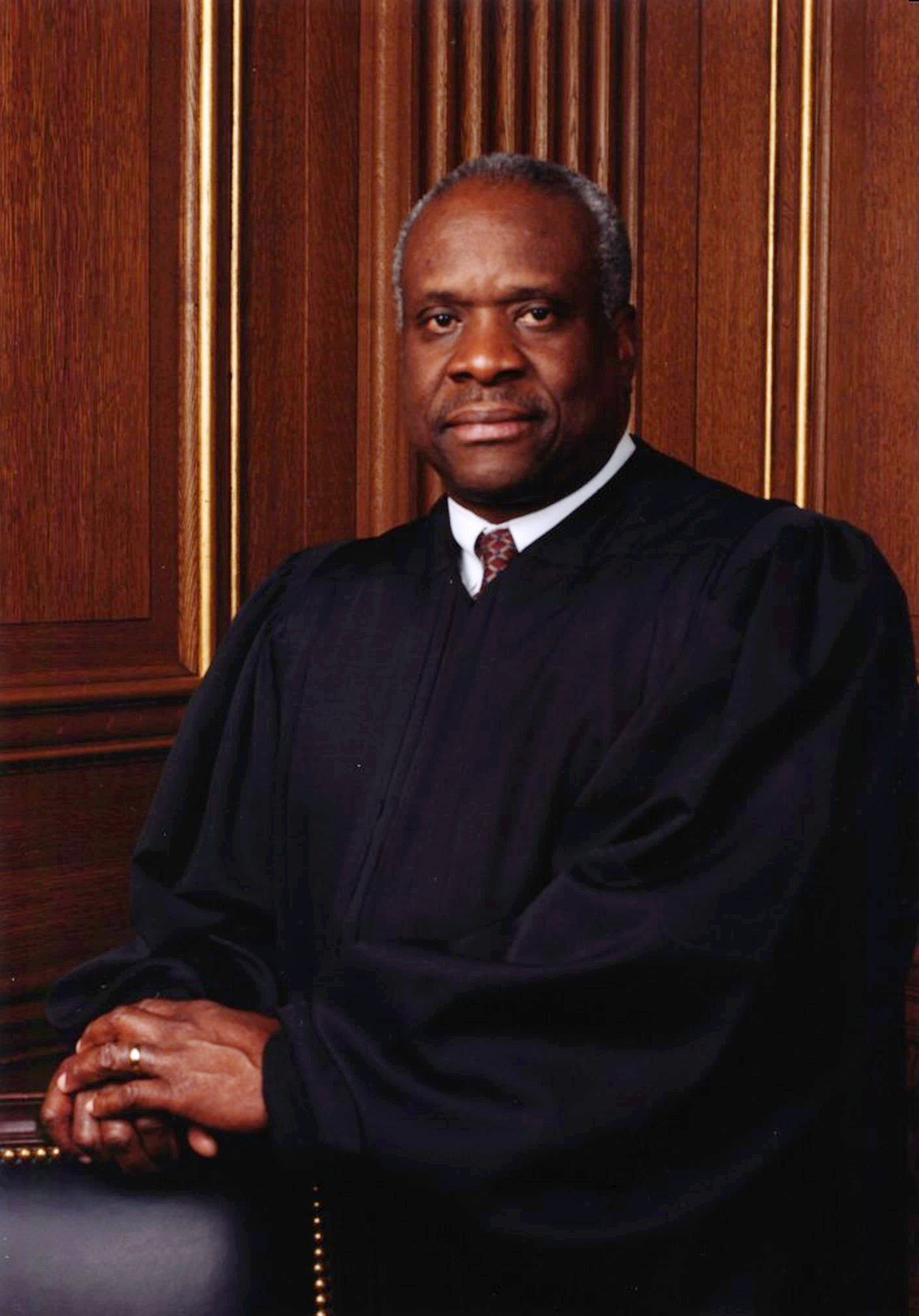
Thomas penned the CoBank decision

Justice Clarence Thomas wrote the decision of the Court, which unanimously reversed the Missouri Supreme Court. The Court held that banks for cooperatives are subject to taxation. Thomas wrote for the Court that nothing in the 1985 amendments to the Farm Credit Act indicated a repeal of the previous express approval of state taxation and that the structure of the Act indicated by negative implication that banks for cooperatives were not entitled to immunity. The Court rejected further claims by CoBank that they were entitled to immunity under McCulloch v. Maryland, stating that that doctrine was expressly not invoked by Congress in this instance.

There was also discussion of the specific wording of the statute. Thomas wrote, "Had Congress simply deleted the final sentence of §2134 that limited the exemption while retaining the sentence granting the exemption, we would have no trouble concluding that Congress had eliminated the States’ ability to tax banks for cooperatives. Short of this act, however, we find Congress’ silence insufficient to disrupt the 50-year history of state taxation of banks for cooperatives."

With this decision, the Missouri Supreme Court had erred in finding an exemption, and the case was remanded to them to alter their previous determination.

== See also ==
- Supremacy Clause
