= Brentwood Academy v. Tennessee Secondary School Athletic Ass'n =

Brentwood Academy v. Tennessee Secondary School Athletic Association
- Supreme Court of the United States

Argued October 11, 2000 Decided February 20, 2001
- Full case name: Brentwood Academy v. Tennessee Secondary School Athletic Association, et al.
- Citations: 531 U.S. 288 (more) 121 S. Ct. 924; 148 L. Ed. 2d 807; 2001 U.S. LEXIS 964

Case history
- Prior: 13 F. Supp. 2d 670 (M.D. Tenn. 1998); reversed, 180 F.3d 758 (6th Cir. 1999); rehearing en banc denied, 190 F.3d 705 (6th Cir. 1999).
- Subsequent: On remand, 262 F.3d 543 (6th Cir. 2001); 304 F. Supp. 2d 981 (M.D. Tenn. 2003); reversed, Tennessee Secondary School Athletic Ass'n v. Brentwood Academy, 551 U.S. 291 (2007).

Holding
- A statewide association, incorporated to regulate interscholastic athletic competition among public and private schools, is regarded as engaging in state action when it enforces a rule against a member school.

Court membership
- Chief Justice William Rehnquist Associate Justices John P. Stevens · Sandra Day O'Connor; Antonin Scalia · Anthony Kennedy; David Souter · Clarence Thomas; Ruth Bader Ginsburg · Stephen Breyer

Case opinions
- Majority: Souter, joined by Stevens, O'Connor, Ginsburg, Breyer
- Dissent: Thomas, joined by Rehnquist, Scalia, Kennedy

Laws applied
- U.S. Const. amend. XIV, 42 U.S.C. § 1983

Brentwood Academy v. Tennessee Secondary School Athletic Association, 531 U.S. 288 (2001), is a United States Supreme Court case concerning whether the actions of an interscholastic sport-association that regulated sports among Tennessee schools could be regarded as a state actor for First Amendment and Due Process purposes. The Court held that the sport-association can be sued as a state actor because its actions and history have been "entangled" with state action. While the Supreme Court would reconsider this same case in the future, this specific decision became important in articulating a new principle of what entities are bound by the First Amendment.

== Background ==
The Tennessee Secondary School Athletic Association (TSSAA) is a non-profit membership corporation organized to regulate interscholastic sports among its members (a large portion of the public and private high schools in Tennessee). The association's role in regulating interscholastic competition in public schools was recognized by the state's Board of Education in the case. Brentwood Academy is a private high school that fields interscholastic teams as a member of TSSAA. Brentwood was highly successful in sports competition, winning nine state football championships between 1969, when it was founded, and 1997. This success fostered resentment among opponent schools, which questioned the Academy's tactics for recruiting players.

In 1997, TSSAA investigated rumors that Brentwood Academy was engaging in illegal practices to recruit public school athletes to the school. No such practices were identified, but TSSAA discovered that Brentwood Academy's football coach had invited eighth grade boys who would be enrolling in the school the following school year to attend spring football practice. TSSAA identified this as a violation of its rules and fined the school $3,000 for contacting student athletes prior to their official enrollment at the school and for violating a TSSAA policy prohibiting "undue influence on a student (or) his or her parents...to secure or to retain a student for athletic purposes." The association also placed the school on four years' probation and banned it from participating in state playoff games for two years.

Brentwood Academy sued the association over this action. Brentwood argued that the enforcement of the rule constituted state action which they claimed violated the First Amendment and the Fourteenth Amendment's Due Process Clause. The school asserted that their due process rights had been violated because there were no evidentiary hearings to determine the validity of the claim that they inappropriately recruited football players. Further, they argued that the rule violated their freedom of speech because it restricted the ways the Academy could recruit. In July 1998, the District Court agreed with this argument and granted summary judgement to the Academy, while enjoining the association from enforcing the rule. A year later, the Sixth Circuit Court of Appeals reversed the lower court's decision, finding that the actions of the association did not constitute 'state action'. The United States Supreme Court granted certiorari of the case to review this question.

== Decision ==
Before any questions of First Amendment law could be decided, the Court had to first determine whether TSSAA was a state entity and so whether the First Amendment applied.

The Court issued a divided decision, splitting 5–4 in favor of reversing the Sixth Circuit and finding the actions of the association as "state action."

Justice Souter wrote for the five-justice majority, "The nominally private character of the Association is overborne by the pervasive entwinement of public institutions and public officials in its composition and workings, and there is no substantial reason to claim unfairness in applying constitutional standards to it." Part of the basis for this determination were historical statements by the Tennessee Board of Education, which had granted regulatory authority to the association and recognition of its own independent authority. For example, the Board explicitly approved the TSSAA's rules and reserved the right to continuously review them in the future. Further, employees at the association were given state pensions. Because the association could essentially "coerce" the member schools to follow its rules and the state would back it up, it was using state police power. Therefore, Souter concluded, the restrictions on denial of due process would apply to the association, and the lawsuit could proceed in the lower courts.

=== Dissenting opinion ===
Justice Clarence Thomas wrote a dissenting opinion, joined by three other Justices. He criticized the usage of a new "entwinement" standard for determining state action, which he said "stretched the doctrine beyond its permissible limits." He attacked the majority's decision as breaking a prohibition on extending the Fourteenth Amendment to "merely private conduct," relying on similar cases that did not extend 'state action' to collegiate sports associations. Further, he said the meaning of 'entwinement' is "unclear" because it was left undefined and possibly too expansive. He concluded by stating that the Court should have affirmed the Sixth Circuit's opinion.

== Subsequent history ==
This case created the "entwinement test", the principle that a private organization could be connected in such a way with state organizations that the private organization itself exercises state power. With this new rule announced, the Court sent the case back to lower courts to reconsider the arguments of Brentwood Academy.

The case was sent back to the Sixth Circuit Court of Appeals who instructed the association that they could prevail if they showed the enforced rule was narrowly defined to promote "governmental interests". A second District Court trial on this factor again resulted in a finding in favor of Brentwood Academy. The Sixth Circuit this time affirmed. In 2007, the Supreme Court again granted review and this time reversed in favor of the association. In a unanimous decision, Justice John Paul Stevens held that the actual rule did not violate the First Amendment and that the tactics used to recruit football players rose to the level of a governmental interest. On other claims though, the case was sent back again to the Sixth Circuit. The Sixth Circuit rejected the remaining claims and the Supreme Court denied review, ending the case.
