= Semtek International Inc. v. Lockheed Martin Corp. =

Semtek v. Lockheed Martin
- Supreme Court of the United States

Argued December 5, 2000 Decided February 27, 2001
- Full case name: Semtek International Incorporated, Petitioner v. Lockheed Martin Corporation
- Citations: 531 U.S. 497 (more) 121 S. Ct. 1021; 149 L. Ed. 2d 32; 2001 U.S. LEXIS 1951; 69 U.S.L.W. 4147; 2001 Cal. Daily Op. Service 1569; 2001 Colo. J. C.A.R. 1046; 14 Fla. L. Weekly Fed. S 109

Case history
- Prior: 128 Md. App. 39, 736 A.2d 1104, reversed and remanded.

Holding
- The claim preclusive effect of a federal judgment on a claim over which subject matter jurisdiction is based solely on diversity is determined by the common law of the state in which the federal district court rendering the decision is located. The Maryland action is not precluded just because a California court dismissed the diversity action.

Court membership
- Chief Justice William Rehnquist Associate Justices John P. Stevens · Sandra Day O'Connor; Antonin Scalia · Anthony Kennedy; David Souter · Clarence Thomas; Ruth Bader Ginsburg · Stephen Breyer

Case opinion
- Majority: Scalia, joined by unanimous

Laws applied
- Federal Rules of Civil Procedure

Semtek v. Lockheed Martin, 531 U.S. 497 (2001), is a United States Supreme Court case in which the Court held that federal common law governs the preclusive effect of a judgment entered in a federal court sitting in diversity.

== Background ==
Petitioners Semtek International Incorporated filed a complaint against Lockheed Martin in California state court, alleging a breach of contract. The case was removed to the local federal district court due to the diversity of citizenship in the case. The trial judge then dismissed the complaint, writing that California's 2-year statute of limitations made the claim "barred".

Semtek International had also filed a claim in Maryland's state court. The court here also dismissed the complaint, but on the grounds that "the res judicata effect" precludes this separate claim in a different state. Since another federal court had dismissed a similar action already, Semtek could not proceed in a different court on virtually similar contentions.

== Opinion of the Court ==
Justice Antonin Scalia wrote the unanimous decision of the Supreme Court, reversing the decision of the Maryland courts. Scalia wrote that there was no final "judgment on the merits" in the California case and thus the Maryland trial was not precluded. A reading of the appropriate rule could be seen as still permitting other actions. Therefore, Semtek was entitled to a trial before the Maryland courts and the case was remanded with such instructions.

== See also ==
- Erie Doctrine
- Jurisdiction
- U.S. Supreme Court
