= United States v. Cleveland Indians Baseball Co. =

United States v. Cleveland Indians Baseball Company
- Supreme Court of the United States

Argued February 27, 2001 Decided April 17, 2001
- Full case name: United States v. Cleveland Indians Baseball Company
- Docket no.: 00-203
- Citations: 532 U.S. 200 (more) 121 S. Ct. 1433; 149 L. Ed. 2d 401; 2001 U.S. LEXIS 3203

Case history
- Prior: Cleveland Indians Baseball Co. v. United States, No. 1:96-CV-2240, 1999 WL 72866 (N.D. Ohio Jan. 25, 1999); affirmed, 215 F.3d 1325 (6th Cir. 2000); cert. granted, 531 U.S. 943 (2000).

Holding
- Wages are to be taxed on the year they were actually paid.

Court membership
- Chief Justice William Rehnquist Associate Justices John P. Stevens · Sandra Day O'Connor; Antonin Scalia · Anthony Kennedy; David Souter · Clarence Thomas; Ruth Bader Ginsburg · Stephen Breyer

Case opinions
- Majority: Ginsburg, joined by Rehnquist, Stevens, O'Connor, Kennedy, Souter, Thomas, Breyer
- Concurrence: Scalia

Laws applied
- 26 U.S.C. §§ 3111(a), 3301

United States v. Cleveland Indians Baseball Company, 532 U.S. 200 (2001), is a United States Supreme Court case that deals with the federal tax code. The question before the court was “Is back-pay subject to federal taxes under the Federal Insurance Contributions Act and the Federal Unemployment Tax Act, based on the year the money should have been paid out?” The court held that wages are to be taxed on the year they were actually paid. Carter G. Phillips argued for the respondent and James A. Feldman argued for the petitioner, the Department of Justice.

== Background ==
The Cleveland Indians Baseball Company owed eight of its players back wages that were due in 1986 and fourteen players back wages that were due in 1987. The company paid the wages in 1994. The company paid taxes on the wages for the 1994 formula. The Company then requested that some of the taxes be refunded by the IRS under the argument that the taxes should be paid based on the year that they were supposed to be paid instead of the year they were actually paid. The taxes would have been significant because the Federal Insurance Contributions Act (FICA) and the Federal Unemployment Tax Act (FUTA) which are used to fund Medicare, Social Security and Unemployment. The FICA and FUTA were both passed after 1987. The Cleveland Indians used Sixth Court precedent in its argument that late wages are taxed upon the year they should have paid. The District Court bound by precedent ordered the government to return the taxes. The Sixth Court of Appeals affirmed the District Court’s ruling.

== Opinion of the Court ==
Unlike the Sixth Court of Appeals the court had limited precedent in which to follow. Therefore, the court simply decided to use the IRS’s interpretation of the law. Justice Ginsburg, delivering the opinion of the court stated “according due respect to the service’s reasonable, longstanding construction of the governments statues and its own regulations, we hold that back wages are subject to FICA and FUTA taxes by reference to the year the wages are in fact paid.”
