= Shaw v. Murphy =

- Supreme Court of the United States

Argued January 16, 2001 Decided April 18, 2001
- Full case name: Robert Shaw, et al. v. Kevin Murphy
- Citations: 532 U.S. 223 (more) 121 S. Ct. 1475; 149 L. Ed. 2d 420; 2001 U.S. LEXIS 3205; 69 U.S.L.W. 4231; 2001 Cal. Daily Op. Service 3051; 2001 Daily Journal DAR 3755; 2001 Colo. J. C.A.R. 1984; 14 Fla. L. Weekly Fed. S 174

Case history
- Prior: The district court denied declaratory and injunctive relief for the petitioner. The Ninth Circuit Court of Appeals reversed, Murphy v. Shaw, 195 F.3d 1121 (9th Cir. 1999); cert. granted, 530 U.S. 1303 (2000).

Holding
- There is no First Amendment right for an incarcerated person to provide legal assistance to another incarcerated person.

Court membership
- Chief Justice William Rehnquist Associate Justices John P. Stevens · Sandra Day O'Connor; Antonin Scalia · Anthony Kennedy; David Souter · Clarence Thomas; Ruth Bader Ginsburg · Stephen Breyer

Case opinions
- Majority: Thomas, joined by unanimous
- Concurrence: Ginsburg

Laws applied
- U.S. Const. amend. I

Shaw v. Murphy, 532 U.S. 223 (2001), is a decision of the United States Supreme Court rejecting the First Amendment right of incarcerated people to provide legal assistance to other incarcerated people.

== Background ==
While incarcerated, Murphy learned that a fellow incarcerated person was charged with assaulting a correctional officer. Murphy authored a letter to the accused person offering legal assistance in his defense. The letter was intercepted pursuant to prison regulations and was reviewed, at which point Murphy was sanctioned for violating the prison's rule against interference in due process hearings.

=== Procedural history ===
Murphy sought declaratory and injunctive relief from the district court, which applied the Supreme Court precedent from Turner v. Safley, and ruled against the petitioner. On appeal, the Ninth Circuit reversed the decision. The Supreme Court granted certiorari.

== Opinion of the Court ==
Writing for a unanimous Court, Justice Clarence Thomas found that the district court had correctly applied the Turner standard, which upheld regulatory impingements on the constitutional rights of incarcerated people where the regulation is reasonably related to a legitimate penological interest. Under Turner, communication among incarcerated people may be monitored and regulated, and the content of the communication (i.e., the legal advice) makes no difference in the assessment of the legality of the regulation.

=== Ginsburg's concurrence ===
Justice Ruth Bader Ginsburg noted in her concurrence that the respondent argued on appeal before the Ninth Circuit that the regulation under which he was charged was vague and overbroad. Because the Ninth Circuit did not rule on the merits of that argument, Ginsburg argued that the remand for which the Court provided should not impede Murphy's ability to raise the issue of vagueness and overbreadth again.
