= Illinois v. McArthur =

- Supreme Court of the United States

Argued November 1, 2000 Decided February 20, 2001
- Full case name: Illinois v. Charles McArthur
- Citations: 531 U.S. 326 (more) 121 S. Ct. 946; 148 L. Ed. 2d 838; 2001 U.S. LEXIS 962

Case history
- Prior: People v. McArthur, 304 Ill. App. 3d 395, 713 N.E.2d 93 (App. 4th Dist. 1999); leave to appeal denied, 185 Ill. 2d 651, 720 N.E.2d 1101 (1999); cert. granted, 529 U.S. 1097 (2000).

Holding
- Police officers who had probable cause to believe an individual was hiding drugs in his home, and who blocked the individual from entering while awaiting a search warrant, did not violate the Fourth Amendment.

Court membership
- Chief Justice William Rehnquist Associate Justices John P. Stevens · Sandra Day O'Connor; Antonin Scalia · Anthony Kennedy; David Souter · Clarence Thomas; Ruth Bader Ginsburg · Stephen Breyer

Case opinions
- Majority: Breyer, joined by Rehnquist, O'Connor, Scalia, Kennedy, Souter, Thomas, Ginsburg
- Concurrence: Souter
- Dissent: Stevens

Laws applied
- US const. amend. IV

Illinois v. McArthur, 531 U.S. 326 (2001), was a United States Supreme Court case decided in 2001. The case concerned the extent of the government's power to limit an individual's complete control of their home pending the arrival of a search warrant. A divided Court held that the search was not unconstitutional because there was a reasonable law-enforcement need to acquire a warrant, namely, to prevent the potential destruction of evidence within the home.

== Background ==
Tera McArthur asked two police officers to accompany her to a trailer home where she lived with her husband Charles, so that she could take her belongings out of the home. Just after she came out of the trailer, she told the police that Charles McArthur had drugs inside. The police knocked and asked Charles if they could search, which he refused. He then came out of the trailer; an officer prevented him from going back inside while the other policeman rushed to get a warrant. The Illinois Appellate Court held that this action violated the Fourth Amendment, which prohibits unreasonable searches and seizures without a warrant. The Supreme Court granted certiorari to hear the case in 2000.

== Opinion of the Court ==
The Court voted 8–1 to reverse the Illinois Appellate Court to hold the actions of the police officers at question constitutional. Justice Breyer wrote the majority opinion which upheld the search. Due to the specific circumstances of the case, the police needed to prevent the investigation scene from being contaminated. Breyer wrote that the Court found "no case in which [we have] held unlawful a temporary seizure that was supported by probable cause and was designed to prevent the loss of evidence while the police diligently obtained a warrant in a reasonable period of time." Moreover, McArthur's argument that his decision to remain on his porch and not allow the police entry did not amount to "a constructive eviction". Instead, Breyer noted that the Court found in a prior case that the doorway of a house is in a 'public place' and thus not subject to warrant rules. He noted in conclusion that the hard-to-contest fact of probable cause made it difficult to accept McArthur's claims.

=== Souter's concurrence ===
Justice Souter joined Breyer's opinion in all respects but wrote separately to condition his support on the belief that the search was appropriate only because of the immediate danger that the evidence could have been destroyed. Only in this unique instance could the warrant requirement be waived.

=== Stevens' dissent ===
Justice Stevens wrote a brief dissenting opinion arguing that the case should have been dismissed because the Illinois legislature has largely reduced penalties for marijuana possession, which made it ridiculous for the officers to rush to get a warrant. He said that even if he reached the merits of the question, he would affirm and hold the search unconstitutional because the majority misapplied a balancing of “privacy-related and law enforcement-related concerns". He wanted to give broader protection to the idea of the home as a place for protection, even if the home in this case was a trailer.

== See also ==
- Mapp v. Ohio (1961)
- Terry v. Ohio (1968)
