= Board of Trustees of the University of Alabama v. Garrett =

- Supreme Court of the United States

Argued October 11, 2000 Decided February 21, 2001
- Full case name: Board of Trustees of the University of Alabama, et al. v. Patricia Garrett, et al.
- Citations: 531 U.S. 356 (more) 121 S. Ct. 955; 148 L. Ed. 2d 866; 2001 U.S. LEXIS 1700; 69 U.S.L.W. 4105; 11 Am. Disabilities Cas. (BNA) 737; 2001 Cal. Daily Op. Service 1471; 2001 Daily Journal DAR 1857; 2001 Colo. J. C.A.R. 968; 14 Fla. L. Weekly Fed. S 92

Case history
- Prior: 989 F. Supp. 1409 (N.D. Ala. 1998), aff'd in part and rev'd in part, 193 F.3d 1214 (11th Cir. 1999), cert. granted, 529 U.S. 1065 (2000).
- Subsequent: 261 F.3d 1242 (11th Cir. 2001), vacated on rehearing, 276 F.3d 1227 (11th Cir. 2001), on remand, 223 F. Supp. 2d 1244 (N.D. Ala. 2002), vacated and remanded, 344 F.3d 1288 (11th Cir. 2003), on remand, 354 F. Supp. 2d 1244 (N.D. Ala. 2005), opinion after remand, 359 F. Supp. 2d 1200 (N.D. Ala. 2005).

Holding
- Congress's enforcement powers under the Fourteenth Amendment to the United States Constitution did not extend to the abrogation of state sovereign immunity under the Eleventh Amendment if the discrimination was rationally based on a disability.

Court membership
- Chief Justice William Rehnquist Associate Justices John P. Stevens · Sandra Day O'Connor; Antonin Scalia · Anthony Kennedy; David Souter · Clarence Thomas; Ruth Bader Ginsburg · Stephen Breyer

Case opinions
- Majority: Rehnquist, joined by O'Connor, Scalia, Kennedy, Thomas
- Concurrence: Kennedy, joined by O'Connor
- Dissent: Breyer, joined by Stevens, Souter, Ginsburg

Laws applied
- U.S. Const. amends. XI, XIV

Board of Trustees of the University of Alabama v. Garrett, 531 U.S. 356 (2001), was a United States Supreme Court case about Congress's enforcement powers under the Fourteenth Amendment to the United States Constitution. The Supreme Court decided that Title I of the Americans with Disabilities Act was unconstitutional, insofar as it allowed states to be sued by private citizens for money damages.

== Background ==
The plaintiffs were Milton Ash and Patricia Garrett, both employees of the University of Alabama school system. They were disabled under the definition of the Americans with Disabilities Act (ADA). Ash was a security guard who had a lifelong history of severe asthma, and Garrett was a nurse who had been diagnosed with breast cancer requiring time-consuming radiation and chemotherapy treatments. Both alleged that they had been discriminated against at their jobs. The university had refused to assign Ash to duties that would alleviate his asthma and insisted on transferring Garrett because of her absences. Ash and Garrett filed a suit in federal court against the University of Alabama for damages, arguing that the university had violated Title I of the ADA, which prohibits discrimination in employment on the basis of disability.

The University of Alabama responded with a motion to dismiss on the grounds that the Eleventh Amendment prohibited the suit. The United States District Court for the Northern District of Alabama dismissed both cases on that ground, but the Eleventh Circuit reversed and held that Congress had expressly abrogated the sovereign immunity of the states.

== Issue ==
Can Congress abrogate states' immunity under its Fourteenth Amendment power to enforce the Equal Protection Clause?

== Decision ==
The majority opinion stated that Congress, in enacting the ADA, had satisfied the requirement that it make clear its intention to abrogate state sovereign immunity and allow states to be sued for damages under the Fourteenth Amendment, however Title I lacked the "congruence and proportionality" required when Congress exercised its enforcement power under the Fourteenth Amendment, citing City of Boerne v. Flores (1997).

Under the Equal Protection Clause, discrimination against people with disabilities is analyzed by "rational basis" scrutiny: if the discrimination has a rational basis, it is constitutional. In this case, the Court held that Congress, like the judiciary, was required to use rational basis review of state action, with its presumptions favoring constitutionality. The Supreme Court decided the legislative record of the ADA "fails to show that Congress did in fact identify a pattern of irrational state discrimination in employment against the disabled."

The Supreme Court stated the "reasonable accommodation" requirement of the ADA law failed the congruence and proportionality test despite the hardship exception to the accommodation requirement: "The ADA does except employers from the 'reasonable accommodatio[n]' requirement where the employer 'can demonstrate that the accommodation would impose an undue hardship on the operation of the business of such covered entity.' § 12112(b)(5)(A). However, even with this exception, the accommodation duty far exceeds what is constitutionally required in that it makes unlawful a range of alternate responses that would be reasonable but would fall short of imposing an 'undue burden' upon the employer. The Act also makes it the employer's duty to prove that it would suffer such a burden, instead of requiring (as the Constitution does) that the complaining party negate reasonable bases for the employer’s decision. See ibid."

The Supreme Court called disability discrimination rational in that hiring non-disabled employees would conserve scarce financial resources by avoiding the need for costly reasonable accommodations: "whereas it would be entirely rational (and therefore constitutional) for a state employer to conserve scarce financial resources by hiring employees who are able to use existing facilities, the ADA requires employers to 'mak[e] existing facilities used by employees readily accessible to and usable by individuals with disabilities.'"

Thus, states have rational reasons for violating the part of the ADA law banning policies that have a disparate impact on disabled people. Even in cases of racial discrimination in which the courts apply a different standard of scrutiny to government action from rational basis review, evidence of disparate impact is insufficient: "The ADA also forbids 'utilizing standards, criteria, or methods of administration' that disparately impact the disabled, without regard to whether such conduct has a rational basis. § 12112(b)(3)(A). Although disparate impact may be relevant evidence of racial discrimination, see Washington v. Davis, 426 U. S. 229, 239 (1976), such evidence alone is insufficient even where the Fourteenth Amendment subjects state action to strict scrutiny."

The Supreme Court had held in Village of Arlington Heights v. Metropolitan Housing Corp. (1977) that disparate impact was not proof of discrimination based on "race, color or national origin," which would trigger strict scrutiny.

The Supreme Court considered the burden of proof to be on those who allege a state action toward disabled people to be irrational: "Moreover, the State need not articulate its reasoning at the moment a particular decision is made. Rather, the burden is upon the challenging party to negative "'any reasonably conceivable state of facts that could provide a rational basis for the classification.'" Heller, supra, at 320 (quoting FCC v. Beach Communications, Inc., 508 U.S. 307, 313 (1993))."

The Supreme Court mentioned the government's argument that "the inquiry as to unconstitutional discrimination should extend not only to States themselves, but to units of local governments, such as cities and counties." It admitted that local governments "are 'state actors' for purposes of the Fourteenth Amendment" but added, "These entities are subject to private claims for damages under the ADA without Congress' ever having to rely on § 5 of the Fourteenth Amendment to render them so. It would make no sense to consider constitutional violations on their part, as well as by the States themselves, when only the States are the beneficiaries of the Eleventh Amendment." Also, "States are not required by the Fourteenth Amendment to make special accommodations for the disabled, so long as their actions towards such individuals are rational. They could quite hardheadedly – and perhaps hardheartedly – hold to job-qualification requirements which do not make allowance for the disabled. If special accommodations for the disabled are to be required, they have to come from positive law and not through the Equal Protection Clause."

The ADA, by allowing states to be sued for damages by private plaintiffs for failing to provide reasonable accommodations provided significantly more Fourteenth Amendment protection for people with disabilities than was allowed by Boerne. That level of protection, the Supreme Court held, was not "congruent and proportional" to the wrong of discrimination against people with disabilities.

The Supreme Court did not address the ability of the federal government to sue the states directly or the ability of Congress to subject local governments to private lawsuits, enforcing federal anti-discrimination laws enacted pursuant to Article I, for example.

Thus, the ADA did not constitutionally abrogate the states' sovereign immunity.

The decision's scope, however, should not be overstated. While it prevents states from being subject to money damages for violations of Title I of the ADA, states are still subject to prospective injunctive relief, under Ex parte Young (1908).

=== Dissent ===
The Court split 5–4, with Justice Stephen Breyer filing a dissenting opinion in which he was joined by Justices John Paul Stevens, David Souter, and Ruth Bader Ginsburg. The dissent stated the following about rational basis review:

Congress found that "[t]wo-thirds of all disabled Americans between the age of 16 and 64 [were] not working at all," even though a large majority wanted to, and were able to, work productively. And Congress found that this discrimination flowed in significant part from "stereotypic assumptions" as well as purposeful unequal treatment.... The problem with the Court's approach is that neither the "burden of proof" that favors States nor any other rule of restraint applicable to judges applies to Congress when it exercises its § 5 power. "Limitations stemming from the nature of the judicial process... have no application to Congress." Rational–basis review—with its presumptions favoring constitutionality—is "a paradigm of judicial restraint." And the Congress of the United States is not a lower court. (Citations omitted)

On "congruence and proportionality," Justice Breyer said that City of Cleburne v. Cleburne Living Center, Inc (1985) and Katzenbach v. Morgan (1966) were precedents that require deference by the Court, not Congress:

I recognize nonetheless that this statute imposes a burden upon States in that it removes their Eleventh Amendment protection from suit, thereby subjecting them to potential monetary liability. Rules for interpreting § 5 that would provide States with special protection, however, run counter to the very object of the Fourteenth Amendment. By its terms, that Amendment prohibits States from denying their citizens equal protection of the laws. Hence "principles of federalism that might otherwise be an obstacle to congressional authority are necessarily overridden by the power to enforce the Civil War Amendments 'by appropriate legislation.' Those Amendments were specifically designed as an expansion of federal power and an intrusion on state sovereignty." (Citations omitted)

== See also ==
- ADA Litigation in the United States
- List of United States Supreme Court cases, volume 531
- Lucy v. Adams (1955)

For a discussion as to why Title II of the ADA should (1) be construed as covering employment and (2) validly abrogates state sovereign immunity in the employment context, see Derek Warden, Four Pathways of Undermining Board of Trustees of the University of Alabama v. Garrett, 42 U. of Ark. Little Rock L. Rev. 555 (2020)
