= Eastern Associated Coal Corp. v. United Mine Workers of America =

Eastern Associated Coal Corp. v. Mine Workers
- Supreme Court of the United States

Argued October 2, 2000 Decided November 28, 2000
- Full case name: Eastern Associated Coal Corporation v. United Mine Workers of America, District 17, et al.
- Citations: 531 U.S. 57 (more) 121 S. Ct. 462; 148 L. Ed. 2d 354; 2000 U.S. LEXIS 8083; 16 I.E.R. Cas. (BNA) 1633; 165 L.R.R.M. 2865; 14 Fla. L. Weekly Fed. S 15

Case history
- Prior: 188 F.3d 501 (4th Cir.)

Holding
- Public policy considerations do not require courts to refuse to enforce an arbitration award ordering an employer to reinstate an employee truck driver who twice tested positive for marijuana.

Court membership
- Chief Justice William Rehnquist Associate Justices John P. Stevens · Sandra Day O'Connor; Antonin Scalia · Anthony Kennedy; David Souter · Clarence Thomas; Ruth Bader Ginsburg · Stephen Breyer

Case opinions
- Majority: Breyer, joined by Rehnquist, Stevens, O'Connor, Kennedy, Souter, Ginsburg
- Concurrence: Scalia (in judgment), joined by Thomas

Eastern Associated Coal Corp. v. Mine Workers, 531 U.S. 57 (2000), was a case in which the Supreme Court of the United States held that public policy considerations do not require courts to refuse to enforce an arbitration award ordering an employer to reinstate an employee truck driver who twice tested positive for marijuana.

== Background ==
Eastern Associated Coal and the United Mine Workers were parties to a collective bargaining agreement which contained provisions requiring arbitration. One such provision, key to the case, was that in any arbitration hearing where Eastern sought to discharge an employee, Eastern had to prove "just cause" for the discharge; otherwise, the arbitrator would order the employee to be reinstated. The arbitrator's decision in any such case was final.

James Smith, a truck driver for Eastern, was subject to random drug testing as his position was deemed "safety sensitive". In March 1996 Smith tested positive for marijuana. Eastern sought to discharge Smith, but the arbitrator ruled that Smith's positive drug test was not "just cause" and ordered Smith reinstated, subject to certain conditions including future drug testing.

Smith would be tested four times between April 1996 and January 1997; each time, no drugs were found. But in July 1997 Smith again tested positive for marijuana, and again Eastern sought discharge. Once again, however, the arbitrator ruled that Smith should be reinstated with conditions, one of which was that he was to provide a signed, undated letter of resignation, to take effect should Smith test positive within the next five years.

This time, Eastern filed suit in District Court, seeking to have the arbitrator's decision vacated on grounds that it "contravened a public policy against the operation of dangerous machinery by workers who test positive for drugs." Although the District Court recognized the "strong regulation-based public policy" against workers in "safety sensitive" positions, it ruled that Smith's conditional reinstatement did not violate that policy, and ordered the enforcement of the arbitrator's decision.

The United States Court of Appeals for the Fourth Circuit affirmed the District Court's decision. The Supreme Court granted certiorari on the basis that the Circuit Courts disagreed on whether the mandatory reinstatement of employees using illegal drugs was against public policy.
