= Green Tree Financial Corp.-Alabama v. Randolph =

- Supreme Court of the United States

Argued October 3, 2000 Decided December 11, 2000
- Full case name: Green Tree Financial Corporation - Alabama and Green Tree Financial Corporation v. Larketta Randolph
- Docket no.: 99-1235
- Citations: 531 U.S. 79 (more) 121 S. Ct. 513; 148 L. Ed. 2d 373

Case history
- Prior: Randolph v. Green Tree Financial Corp., 991 F. Supp. 1410 (M.D. Ala. 1997); reversed, 178 F.3d 1149 (11th Cir. 1999); cert. granted, 529 U.S. 1052 (2000).
- Subsequent: 244 F.3d 814 (11th Cir. 2001)

Holding
- (1) An order compelling arbitration pursuant to an agreement is a "final decision with respect to arbitration" (2) An arbitration agreement that is silent on arbitration costs and fees is enforceable

Court membership
- Chief Justice William Rehnquist Associate Justices John P. Stevens · Sandra Day O'Connor; Antonin Scalia · Anthony Kennedy; David Souter · Clarence Thomas; Ruth Bader Ginsburg · Stephen Breyer

Case opinions
- Majority: Rehnquist, joined by O'Connor, Scalia, Kennedy, Thomas; Stevens, Souter, Ginsburg, Breyer (in part)
- Concur/dissent: Ginsburg, joined by Stevens, Souter; Breyer (in part)

Laws applied
- Federal Arbitration Act

Green Tree Financial Corp-Alabama v. Randolph, 531 U.S. 79 (2000), is a decision by the United States Supreme Court. The case dealt with the enforceability of arbitration agreements that did not discuss the cost of the arbitration itself and with the finality of certain arbitration decisions.

== Background ==
Larketta Randolph purchased a mobile home from Better Cents Home Builders, Inc., in Opelika, Alabama. This was financed through Green Tree Financial Corporation and its subsidiary, Green Tree Financial Corp.-Alabama. Randolph's Manufactured Home Retail Installment Contract and Security Agreement required that Randolph buy a specific type of insurance and that disputes about this provision would have to be settled by arbitration. Randolph sued and sought a formal trial and not arbitration. However, Green Tree Financial Corporation asked the District Court to compel arbitration. The District Court granted that motion to compel arbitration and Randolph appealed to the Eleventh Circuit Court of Appeals.

The Court of Appeals for the Eleventh Circuit made two rulings. Firstly, it held that under the Federal Arbitration Act, the decision of the District Court was a "final decision", thus giving the appellate court jurisdiction. Secondly it held that the arbitration agreement was unenforceable because it was silent with respect to the payment of filing fees, arbitrators' costs and other arbitration-related expenses. Because the agreement would therefore force Randolph to pay the "steep" arbitration costs, and thus was unfair and invalid. It was this point on which the Supreme Court split when they heard the appeal in 2000.

== Opinion of the Court ==
Chief Justice Rehnquist delivered the opinion of the Court. The Court unanimously upheld the Court of Appeals' jurisdiction to hear the case, saying that the order compelling Randolph into arbitration was a "final decision". However, the Court divided on whether the arbitration agreement was enforceable even when it was silent on arbitration costs and fees. Writing for the majority, Rehnquist wrote that "[a]lthough the existence of large arbitration costs may well preclude a litigant...from effectively vindicating [her statutory rights], the record does not show that Randolph will bear such costs if she goes to arbitration."

=== Dissent ===
Justice Ruth Bader Ginsburg wrote a brief opinion concurring in part and dissenting in part, arguing that the fact that Randolph had no idea how much the arbitration proceedings could cost her would cause the agreement to be unenforceable. The majority, in disagreeing, remanded the case back to the Eleventh Circuit with instructions to find the agreement valid under law.

== Subsequent History ==
The Eleventh Circuit Court of Appeals affirmed the original finding that Randolph was forced to go into arbitration. Because the Supreme Court had upheld the provision of the arbitration agreement that was silent on the costs of arbitration proceedings, there was no way to vacate the initial judge's decision.

== See also ==
- Contract law
