= Central Green Co. v. United States =

- Supreme Court of the United States

Argued October 30, 2000 Decided February 21, 2001
- Full case name: Central Green Corporation v. United States
- Citations: 531 U.S. 425 (more) 121 S. Ct. 1005; 148 L. Ed. 2d 919

Case history
- Prior: On Writ of Certiorari to the United States Court of Appeals for the Ninth Circuit

Holding
- The term 'flood or flood waters' within the Flood Control Act of 1928 includes water that is released for the purpose of flood control

Court membership
- Chief Justice William Rehnquist Associate Justices John P. Stevens · Sandra Day O'Connor; Antonin Scalia · Anthony Kennedy; David Souter · Clarence Thomas; Ruth Bader Ginsburg · Stephen Breyer

Case opinion
- Majority: Stevens, joined by unanimous

Laws applied
- Flood Control Act of 1928

Central Green Co. v. United States, 531 U.S. 425 (2001), was a United States Supreme Court case decided in 2001. The case concerned the meaning of the words "flood or flood waters" within the Flood Control Act of 1928. The Court concluded that the law did not always apply to federal flood control facilities.

== Background ==
Central Green Co. owned 1,000 acres of pistachio orchards in California's San Joaquin Valley. The Madera Canal flowed through their property. In 1996, they brought a suit against the United States alleging negligence in the operation and design of the canal. They alleged that it causes subsurface flooding which destroyed some of their crop. In court, the United States argued that the Flood Control Act of 1928 grants them immunity, as it states "[n]o liability of any kind shall attach to or rest upon the United States for any damage from or by floods or flood waters at any place". The District Court dismissed the complaint, agreeing with the United States that this incident would fall in the confines of "flood or flood waters". Central Green Co. appealed and the Ninth Circuit Court of Appeals affirmed. It agreed with Central Green that the Madera Canal "serves no flood control purpose", but nevertheless held that immunity attached "solely because it is a branch of the Central Valley Project". Central Green appealed again, this time to the United States Supreme Court, which granted review.

== Opinion of the Court ==
Justice Stevens wrote the decision of the Court, which was unanimous. Stevens began by stating a prior case bound the Court to a different interpretation of the phrase "floods or flood waters" than the Ninth Circuit. In James v. United States (1986), the Court found the phrase "floods or flood waters" encompassed waters released for flood control purposes when reservoired waters are at flood stage. He went on to write that it was a difficult 'fact-led' question about whether this singular incident would fall within the James decision. For that reason, the Court would allow the suit to proceed in the District Court, only concluding that it was in error for the Government to receive absolute immunity in this case. Therefore, the Ninth Circuit was reversed.

== See also ==
- Flood Control Act of 1928
- Legislative intent
