= Gitlitz v. Commissioner =

- Supreme Court of the United States

Argued October 2, 2000 Decided January 9, 2001
- Full case name: David A. Gitlitz, ex ux., et al. v. Commissioner of Internal Revenue
- Citations: 531 U.S. 206 (more) 121 S. Ct. 701; 148 L. Ed. 2d 613

Case history
- Prior: Winn v. Comm'r, 75 T.C.M. (CCH) 1840 (T.C. 1998); aff'd sub nom. Gitlitz v. Comm'r, 182 F.3d 1143 (10th Cir. 1999); cert. granted, 529 U.S. 1097 (2000).
- Subsequent: On remand, 6 F. App'x 770 (10th Cir. 2001).

Holding
- The Internal Revenue Code permits taxpayers to increase bases in their S corporation stock by the amount of an S corporation's discharge of indebtedness excluded from gross income and the increase occurs before taxpayers are required to reduce the S corporation's tax attributes.

Court membership
- Chief Justice William Rehnquist Associate Justices John P. Stevens · Sandra Day O'Connor; Antonin Scalia · Anthony Kennedy; David Souter · Clarence Thomas; Ruth Bader Ginsburg · Stephen Breyer

Case opinions
- Majority: Thomas, joined by Rehnquist, Stevens, O'Connor, Scalia, Kennedy, Souter, Ginsburg
- Dissent: Breyer

Laws applied
- Internal Revenue Code

Gitlitz v. Commissioner, 531 U.S. 206 (2001), was a United States Supreme Court case decided in 2001. The case concerned a technical question of tax law dealing with the tax attributes of an S corporation.

== Background ==
In 1991, P. D. W. & A., Inc., an insolvent corporation taxed under Subchapter S, excluded its entire discharge of indebtedness amount from its gross income. David Gitlitz and other shareholders were assessed tax deficiencies because they used the untaxed discharge of indebtedness to increase their basis in S corporation stock and to deduct suspended losses. Eventually, the Tax Court held that Gitlitz could not use the S corporation's untaxed discharge of indebtedness to increase their basis in corporate stock. In affirming, the Court of Appeals held that the discharge of indebtedness amount first had to be used to reduce certain tax attributes of the S corporation and that only the leftover amount could be used to increase their basis. Gitlitz appealed and the U.S. Supreme Court decided to hear the case.

== Opinion of the Court ==
Justice Thomas wrote the decision of the Court which reversed the Court of Appeals. He wrote that excluded discharged debt is an "item of income", which passes through to shareholders and increases their basis in an S corporation's stock and that pass-through is performed before the reduction of an S corporation's tax attributes. He wrote that it "simply does not say that discharge of indebtedness ceases to be an item of income when the S corporation is insolvent. Instead it provides only that discharge of indebtedness ceases to be included in gross income." "In order to determine the 'tax imposed,' an S corporation shareholder must adjust his basis in his corporate stock and pass through all items of income and loss. Consequently, the attribute reduction must be made after the basis adjustment and pass-through."

Only Justice Breyer did not join Thomas's opinion. He disagreed with the statutory interpretation of the decision, believing that examining the direct language of the provision would have led the Court to a contrary result.

== See also ==
- Internal Revenue Code
