= Glover v. United States =

- Supreme Court of the United States

Argued November 27, 2000 Decided January 9, 2001
- Full case name: Paul L. Glover v. United States
- Citations: 531 U.S. 198 (more) 121 S. Ct. 696; 148 L. Ed. 2d 604

Case history
- Prior: On Writ of Certiorari to the United States Court of Appeals for the Seventh Circuit
- Subsequent: Case reversed and remanded to correct sentencing error

Holding
- A significant increase in a prison sentence is not required in order to show prejudice in a claim for ineffective assistance of counsel.

Court membership
- Chief Justice William Rehnquist Associate Justices John P. Stevens · Sandra Day O'Connor; Antonin Scalia · Anthony Kennedy; David Souter · Clarence Thomas; Ruth Bader Ginsburg · Stephen Breyer

Case opinion
- Majority: Kennedy, joined by unanimous

Laws applied
- US amend. V, Sentencing Guidelines

Glover v. United States, 531 U.S. 198 (2001), was a United States Supreme Court case decided in 2001. The case dealt with a technical question of law relating to whether a showing of prejudice in incorrect sentencing decisions is required for a correction of that sentence.

== Background ==
Paul Glover was the Vice President and General Counsel of the Chicago Truck Drivers, Helpers, and Warehouse Workers Union. A trial showed that he tried to enrich himself and others through kickbacks. The federal trial court sentenced him to 84 months in prison, denying a request to 'group' consideration of similar offenses on which he was convicted, which would have lowered the sentence range. His attorneys did not raise this issue on his first appeal to the Seventh Circuit, which affirmed his conviction. Glover filed a motion on his own to try to correct his sentence. He argued that the failure of his attorneys to appeal on the grouping question constituted ineffective assistance of counsel. However, because there was no proof that the sentencing alteration was 'significant', the Court of Appeals for the Seventh Circuit affirmed. Glover wanted a lower range (which would have a minimum of 63 months) and so he appealed to the United States Supreme Court which granted the case for consideration in 2000.

== Opinion of the Court ==
Justice Anthony Kennedy wrote the decision of the Court which was unanimous. He stated that the Strickland test's prejudice prong did not require a showing that a wrongful increase in a sentence met 'a standard of significance'. The Seventh Circuit was thus incorrect because "there is no obvious dividing line by which to measure how much longer a sentence must be for the increase to constitute substantial prejudice... although the amount by which a defendant's sentence is increased by a particular decision may be a factor to consider in determining whether counsel's performance in failing to argue the point constitutes ineffective assistance, ...it cannot serve as a bar to a showing of prejudice." Therefore, Glover's sentence had to be recalculated and the case was remanded for further proceedings in lower courts.

== See also ==
- Strickland v. Washington
