= City News & Novelty, Inc. v. City of Waukesha =

City News & Novelty v. Waukesha
- Supreme Court of the United States

Argued November 28, 2000 Decided January 17, 2001
- Full case name: City News & Novelty, Inc. v. City of Waukesha
- Citations: 531 U.S. 278 (more) 121 S. Ct. 743; 148 L. Ed. 2d 757

Case history
- Prior: Denial affirmed, n°97-1502 (Wis. Ct. App. April 2, 1997); affirmed, 231 Wis.2d 93, 604 N.W.2d 870 (1999); certiorary granted, 530 U.S. 1242 (2000)

Holding
- The writ of certiorari is dismissed as moot due to the store withdrawing its application.

Court membership
- Chief Justice William Rehnquist Associate Justices John P. Stevens · Sandra Day O'Connor; Antonin Scalia · Anthony Kennedy; David Souter · Clarence Thomas; Ruth Bader Ginsburg · Stephen Breyer

Case opinion
- Majority: Ginsburg, joined by unanimous

Laws applied
- First Amendment

City News & Novelty, Inc. v. Waukesha, 531 U.S. 278 (2001), was a United States Supreme Court case decided in 2001. The case concerned the denial of a business license for an adult store which sold sexually explicit materials. The Court eventually dismissed the case as the store had withdrawn their application to renew their license.

== Background ==
In Freeman v. Maryland the United States Supreme Court announced procedural requirements necessary to guard against unconstitutional prior restraint. Under this regime, the state of Wisconsin set up an administrative review process for reconsidering denials of licenses for adult stores. City News & Novelty, Inc., requested a renewal to operate their business in the city of Waukesha. Their application was denied.

Wisconsin state courts upheld the denial and the store appealed to the Supreme Court, arguing that they were not afforded proper judicial review of their matter before lower courts. The Supreme Court accepted the case to resolve a split amongst state and federal courts over how swift judicial review in these matters must be.

Jeff Scott Olson, the attorney for the store, called the Supreme Court appeal important. According to Olson, "prompt judicial review" is important because municipal decisions on license matters can sometimes happen for a "distaste" of the particular business.

== Opinion of the Court ==
Justice Ruth Bader Ginsburg wrote the decision for a unanimous court, dismissing the case. The basis for the dismissal was that City News had withdrawn its renewal application entirely. This meant that there was no "cognizable interest in the outcome" of the case. While expressing a desire to resolve the important question in this case regarding judicial review of state censorship, there was no way for the matter to survive when there was no live controversy.

== See also ==
- Free speech in the United States
