= Artuz v. Bennett =

- Supreme Court of the United States

Argued October 10, 2000 Decided November 7, 2000
- Full case name: Christopher Artuz, Superintendent, Green Haven Correctional Facility v. Tony Bruce Bennett
- Citations: 531 U.S. 4 (more) 121 S. Ct. 361; 148 L. Ed. 2d 213; 2000 U.S. LEXIS 7437

Case history
- Prior: On Writ of Certiorari to the Second Circuit Court of Appeals
- Subsequent: Remanded to the District Court

Holding
- An application for state postconviction relief containing procedurally barred claims is filed within the meaning of the AEDPA.

Court membership
- Chief Justice William Rehnquist Associate Justices John P. Stevens · Sandra Day O'Connor; Antonin Scalia · Anthony Kennedy; David Souter · Clarence Thomas; Ruth Bader Ginsburg · Stephen Breyer

Case opinion
- Majority: Scalia, joined by unanimous

Laws applied
- AEDPA (1996)

Artuz v. Bennett, 531 U.S. 4 (2000), was a unanimously-decided United States Supreme Court case. The case concerned whether a habeas corpus petition tolled for time under the Antiterrorism and Effective Death Penalty Act of 1996 when certain state claims are still pending. The Court held that the petition did not toll.

== Facts ==
The petitioner, Bennett, was convicted of attempted murder after shooting at police. In 1995, Bennett moved pro se to vacate his conviction, which was denied orally by a New York court. Bennett claimed that he never received a copy of a written order reflecting the denial. In 1998, Bennett filed a federal habeas corpus petition alleging violations of his rights to present witnesses in his defense and to a fair trial, to be present at all material stages of the trial, and to the effective assistance of counsel. The Federal District Court dismissed Bennett's federal habeas corpus petition as untimely under the Antiterrorism and Effective Death Penalty Act of 1996 (AEDPA), which set a 1-year period of limitation on federal habeas corpus applications by state prisoners. The Court of Appeals found that the habeas corpus petition was not time barred due to Bennett not receiving a written order from his 1995 claim.

== Opinion ==
Justice Scalia delivered the unanimous decision for the Court, which held that an application for postconviction relief containing procedurally barred claims is properly filed within the meaning of the Antiterrorism and Effective Death Penalty Act of 1996. Only the specific claims and not the actual filing of the claims could be defaulted under state law, he argued. "An application is 'filed', as that term is commonly understood," Scalia wrote, "when it is delivered to, and accepted by, the appropriate state officer for placement into the official record". In the present case, the Court had not issued a written dismissal, just an oral decision from the bench. That would not count toward the tolling of the habeas claim.

== See also ==
- Habeas corpus
- Death penalty
