= Buckman Co. v. Plaintiffs' Legal Committee =

Buckman Co. v. Plaintiffs Legal Comm.
- Supreme Court of the United States

Argued December 4, 2000 Decided February 21, 2001
- Full case name: Buckman Company, Petitioners, v. Plaintiffs Legal Committee
- Citations: 531 U.S. 341 (more) 121 S. Ct. 1012; 148 L. Ed. 2d 854

Case history
- Prior: In re Orthopedic Bone Screw Products Liability Litigation, 159 F.3d 817 (3d Cir. 1998), reversed.

Holding
- Plaintiffs' claims are pre-empted under the Federal Food, Drug and Cosmetic Act.

Court membership
- Chief Justice William Rehnquist Associate Justices John P. Stevens · Sandra Day O'Connor; Antonin Scalia · Anthony Kennedy; David Souter · Clarence Thomas; Ruth Bader Ginsburg · Stephen Breyer

Case opinions
- Majority: Rehnquist, joined by O'Connor, Scalia, Kennedy, Souter, Ginsburg, Breyer
- Concurrence: Stevens (in judgment), joined by Thomas

Laws applied
- Federal Food, Drug, and Cosmetic Act (FDCA)

Buckman Co. v. Plaintiffs Legal Comm., 531 U.S. 341 (2001), was a United States Supreme Court case decided in 2001. The case concerned whether the FDCA (Food, Drug and Cosmetic Act), a federal statute, pre-empted a state-law fraud-on-the-FDA claim. Although finding it on different grounds, the Court decided to reject the lawsuit attempt.

== Background ==
The Plaintiffs' Legal Committee represented plaintiffs who claimed injuries resulting from the use of bone screws on their spines. They sued Buckman Company, alleging they made fraudulent representations to the FDA. They further argued that "but for" the false representations, the injuries would not have occurred.

The District Court for the Eastern District of Pennsylvania heard these claims and decided to dismiss the "fraud-on-the-FDA" sections of the complaint on the ground that it was pre-empted by federal law. A divided panel of the United States Court of Appeals for the Third Circuit reversed, arguing that there was no express pre-emption.

Buckman Company appealed to the Supreme Court which heard the case in December 2000.

== Opinion of the Court ==
Chief Justice William Rehnquist wrote the decision of the Supreme Court, reversing the Third Circuit. He concluded that there was express pre-emption because holding these claims under state law would "inevitably conflict" with the FDA's duty to police fraud. Additionally, to allow such suits could potentially chill information provided to the FDA, a concern the Court thought would hamper the FDA's evaluation of applications.

Justice John Paul Stevens wrote a concurring opinion in the judgement of the Court, which Justice Clarence Thomas joined. Thus, they agreed with reversing the Third Circuit, but on different grounds. Stevens said the lawsuit could not proceed because the plaintiffs could not rebut the fact that the FDA did not remove the allegedly defective products from the market. Therefore, there was no "but for" causation in the first instance.

== See also ==
- Food and Drug Administration
- Federalism
