= Shafer v. South Carolina =

- Supreme Court of the United States

Argued January 9, 2001 Decided March 20, 2001
- Full case name: Wesley Aaron Shafer, Jr., Petitioner v. South Carolina
- Citations: 532 U.S. 36 (more) 121 S. Ct. 1263; 149 L. Ed. 2d 178

Case history
- Prior: On Writ of Certiorari to the Supreme Court of South Carolina

Holding
- Where a capital defendant's future dangerousness is at issue, and the only sentencing alternative to death is life imprisonment without the possibility of parole, due process entitles the defendant to inform the jury of his future parole ineligibility.

Court membership
- Chief Justice William Rehnquist Associate Justices John P. Stevens · Sandra Day O'Connor; Antonin Scalia · Anthony Kennedy; David Souter · Clarence Thomas; Ruth Bader Ginsburg · Stephen Breyer

Case opinions
- Majority: Ginsburg, joined by Rehnquist, Stevens, O'Connor, Kennedy, Souter, Breyer
- Dissent: Scalia
- Dissent: Thomas

Laws applied
- U.S. amend. VIII

Shafer v. South Carolina, 532 U.S. 36 (2001), was a United States Supreme Court case decided in 2001. The case concerned the ability of a defendant to tell the jury that, absent a penalty of death, a penalty of life imprisonment would not permit early release of a prisoner on parole. While the question had been decided in the case of Simmons v. South Carolina, this case dealt with the extent of the ruling.

== Background ==
In 1994, the United States Supreme Court decided the case of Simmons v. South Carolina. The U.S. Supreme Court held in this case that where a capital defendant's future dangerousness is at issue, and the only sentencing alternative to death available to the jury is life imprisonment without possibility of parole, due process requires that the jury be informed of the defendant's parole ineligibility. The state of South Carolina had changed its sentencing laws in the succeeding years to include the actual possibility of parole in absence of the death penalty, after sentencing questions were answered by the jury.

In the late Fall of 1997, Wesley Aaron Shafer, Jr. was found guilty of murder. During the sentencing phase, Shafer's counsel argued that Simmons required the trial judge to instruct the jury that under South Carolina law, a life sentence carries no possibility of parole. The prosecution responded that because the state did not plan to argue to the jury that Shafer would be a danger in the future, no Simmons instruction was required. During deliberations, the jury asked under what conditions someone convicted of murder could become available for parole. The trial judge stated that parole eligibility or ineligibility was not a matter for the jury's consideration. Ultimately, the jury recommended the death penalty and the judge imposed the sentence. In affirming, the South Carolina Supreme Court held that Simmons generally did not apply to the State's sentencing scheme because an alternative to death other than life without the possibility of parole existed.

== Opinion of the Court ==
Justice Ruth Bader Ginsburg wrote the Opinion of the Court, which reversed the decision of the South Carolina Supreme Court, finding in favor of Shafer. She wrote that "whenever future dangerousness is at issue in a capital sentencing proceeding under South Carolina's new scheme, due process requires that the jury be informed that a life sentence carries no possibility of parole." She continued with this line of thinking, explaining "[i]t is only when the jury endeavors the moral judgment whether to impose the death penalty that parole eligibility may become critical. Correspondingly, it is only at that stage that Simmons comes into play, a stage at which South Carolina law provides no third choice, no 30-year mandatory minimum, just death or life without parole." Therefore, South Carolina's actions violated Shafer's Due Process rights, and the case was sent back for renewed sentencing determinations.

=== Dissenting opinions ===
Justice Antonin Scalia wrote a brief dissent from the majority's decision. He agreed that under Simmons, Shafer would probably have to have a new chance at sentencing; instead, he argued that this new criminal rule made by the courts was not proper for the American system of jurisprudence.

Justice Clarence Thomas wrote a separate dissent in the same lines as Scalia's. He also agreed that the majority decision was the "next logical step of Simmons" However, he argued that the instructions by the judge in this case were adequate under the standards set forth by the Court. He reasoned that the jury clearly understood what the two possibilities were, and thus no due process violation had occurred.

== See also ==
- Jury instructions
- Parole
