= NLRB v. Kentucky River Community Care, Inc. =

- Supreme Court of the United States

Argued February 21, 2001 Decided May 29, 2001
- Full case name: National Labor Relations Board v. Kentucky River Community Care, Inc.
- Citations: 532 U.S. 706 (more) 121 S. Ct. 1861; 149 L. Ed. 2d 939

Case history
- Prior: Ky. River Cmty. Care, Inc. v. NLRB, 193 F.3d 444 (6th Cir. 1999); cert. granted, 530 U.S. 1304 (2000).

Holding
- 1. Respondent carries the burden of proving the nurses' supervisory status in the representation hearing and unfair labor practice proceeding 2. The Board's test for determining supervisory status was inconsistent with the Act.

Court membership
- Chief Justice William Rehnquist Associate Justices John P. Stevens · Sandra Day O'Connor; Antonin Scalia · Anthony Kennedy; David Souter · Clarence Thomas; Ruth Bader Ginsburg · Stephen Breyer

Case opinions
- Majority: Scalia, joined by unanimous (part II); Rehnquist, O'Connor, Kennedy, Thomas (parts I and III)
- Concur/dissent: Stevens, joined by Souter, Ginsburg, Breyer

Laws applied
- National Labor Relations Act of 1935

NLRB v. Kentucky River Community Care, Inc., 532 U.S. 706 (2001), is a US labor law case, concerning the scope of labor rights in the United States.

== Facts ==
Staff working for Kentucky River Community Care, who worked as nurses, petitioned the National Labor Relations Board to be recognized as a bargaining unit to get a collective agreement for their workplace. The employer argued that registered nurses had no rights to bargain, as they were "supervisors" and not "employees" under the National Labor Relations Act of 1935 §2(11).

== Judgment ==
Five members of the Supreme Court held that six registered nurses who exercised supervisory status over others fell into the 'professional' exemption. Justice Scalia gave the opinion of the court, joined in full by Chief Justice Rehnquist and Justices O'Connor, Kennedy and Thomas. He said the following:

The text of 2(11) of the Act that we quoted above, 29 U.S.C. 152(11), sets forth a three-part test for determining supervisory status. Employees are statutory supervisors if (1) they hold the authority to engage in any 1 of the 12 listed supervisory functions, (2) their "exercise of such authority is not of a merely routine or clerical nature, but requires the use of independent judgment," and (3) their authority is held "in the interest of the employer." NLRB v. Health Care & Retirement Corp. of America, 511 U.S. 571, 573-574 (1994). The only basis asserted by the Board, before the Court of Appeals and here, for rejecting respondent's proof of supervisory status with respect to directing patient care was the Board's interpretation of the second part of the test-to wit, that employees do not use "independent judgment" when they exercise "ordinary professional or technical judgment in directing less-skilled employees to deliver services in accordance with employer-specified standards." Brief for Petitioner 11. The Court of Appeals rejected that interpretation, and so do we.

Justice Stevens dissented in part, joined by Justices Souter, Ginsburg and Breyer, arguing that if "the 'supervisor' is construed too broadly", without regard to the Act's purpose, protection "is effectively nullified".

In my opinion, the National Labor Relations Board correctly found that respondent, Kentucky River Community Care, Inc., failed to prove that the six registered nurses employed at its facility in Pippa Passes, Kentucky, are "supervisors" within the meaning of the National Labor Relations Act....

As this Court has acknowledged, the inclusion of professional employees and the exclusion of supervisors necessarily gives rise to some tension in the statutory text. Cf. NLRB v. Yeshiva Univ., [1980] USSC 24; 444 U.S. 672, 686 (1980). Accordingly, if the term "supervisor" is construed too broadly, without regard for the statutory context, then Congress' inclusion of professionals within the Act's protections is effectively nullified. See HCR, 511 U.S., at 585 (Ginsburg, J., dissenting). In my opinion, the Court's approach does precisely what it accuses the Board of doing-namely, reading one part of the statute to the exclusion of the other.

The Court acknowledges today that deference is appropriate when the Board determines both the degree of discretion required for supervisory status as well as the significance of limitations on the alleged supervisor's discretion imposed by the employer. Thus, in a case like this, a court should not second-guess the Board's evaluation of the authority of the nurses as building supervisors, or of the significance of the employer's definition of that authority.

However, in a tour de force supported by little more than ipse dixit, the Court concludes that no deference is due the Board's evaluation of the "kind of judgment" that professional employees exercise. Ante, at 7. Thus, under the Court's view, it is impermissible for the Board to attach a different weight to a nurse's judgment that an employee should be reassigned or disciplined than to a nurse's judgment that the employee should take a patient's temperature, even if nurses routinely instruct others to take a patient's temperature but do not ordinarily reassign or discipline employees. The Court's approach finds no support in the text of the statute, and is inconsistent with our case law. See, e.g., Yeshiva, 444 U.S., at 690 ("Only if an employee's activities fall outside of the scope of the duties routinely performed by similarly situated professionals will he be found aligned with management").

The Court further argues that the Board errs by not applying its limiting interpretation of the term "independent judgment" to all 12 functions identified by the statute as supervisory in nature. Ante, at 8-9. But of those 12, it is only "responsibly to direct" that is ambiguous and thus capable of swallowing the whole if not narrowly construed. The authority to "promote" or to "discharge," to use only two examples, is specific and readily identifiable. In contrast, the authority "responsibly to direct" is far more vague. Thus, it is only logical for the term "independent judgment" to take on different contours depending on the nature of the supervisory function at issue and its comparative ambiguity.

Simply put, these are quintessential examples of terms that the expert agency should be allowed to interpret in the light of the policies animating the statute. See, e.g., Curtin Matheson, 494 U.S., at 786; Chevron U.S.A., Inc. v. Natural Resources Defense Council, Inc., [1984] USSC 140; 467 U.S. 837, 843 (1984). Because the Board's interpretation is fully consistent both with the statutory text and with the policy favoring collective bargaining by professional employees, this Court is obligated to uphold it.

== See also ==
- United States labor law
