= Cleveland v. United States (2000) =

- Supreme Court of the United States

Argued October 10, 2000 Decided November 7, 2000
- Full case name: Carl W. Cleveland, Petitioner v. United States
- Citations: 531 U.S. 12 (more) 121 S. Ct. 365, 148 L. Ed. 2d 221, 2000 U.S. LEXIS 7436

Case history
- Prior: motion to dismiss denied, 951 F.Supp. 1249 (E.D. La. 1997); defendants convicted and forfeiture ordered, unreported (E.D. La. 1997); affirmed sub. nom. U.S. v. Bankston, 182 F.3d 296 (5th Cir. 1999); certiorari granted, 529 U.S. 1017 (2000)

Holding
- "Property" for the purposes of federal law does not include state video poker licenses.

Court membership
- Chief Justice William Rehnquist Associate Justices John P. Stevens · Sandra Day O'Connor; Antonin Scalia · Anthony Kennedy; David Souter · Clarence Thomas; Ruth Bader Ginsburg · Stephen Breyer

Case opinion
- Majority: Ginsburg, joined by unanimous

Laws applied
- 18 U.S.C. § 1341

Cleveland v. United States, 531 U.S. 12 (2000), was a United States Supreme Court case that concerned the definition of "property" under the federal mail fraud statute. In a unanimous decision, the Court held that "property" for the purposes of federal law did not include state video poker licences because such transactions were not a vested right or expectation.

== Background ==
The federal mail fraud statute proscribes the use of the mails in furtherance of "any scheme or artifice to defraud" as illegal activity. Part of the statute indicates that such schemes relating to "obtaining money or property" by false pretenses is covered. Carl W. Cleveland was prosecuted under the statute. The state alleged Cleveland had deceived another company relating to video poker license renewals. Before trial, he unsuccessfully attempted to get the charges dismissed. A jury later found him guilty and he was sentenced to over 100 months in prison. Cleveland appealed.

The Fifth Circuit Court of Appeals affirmed the conviction and sentence, holding that "property" did in fact include video poker licenses in the "hands of the state". After a series of appellate courts split on this issue, the Supreme Court granted certiorari.

== Opinion of the Court ==
Justice Ginsburg delivered the unanimous decision of the Supreme Court which reversed the Fifth Circuit and vacated Cleveland's sentence. The basis for the decision was two-fold: first, the Court had held in a previous case that the federal mail fraud statute is "limited in scope to the protection of property rights". This meant that, taken in context of the purpose of the law, there was no intangible right for honest services in terms of the video poker licenses; therefore, there was no "property" interest. Moreover, the Court additionally found that the state interest in keeping the licenses process honest and proper would not be enough to link an economic interest to the "rights" idea contained in the federal statute.

== See also ==
- Cleveland v. United States (1946)
- Ciminelli v. United States (2023)
