= PGA Tour, Inc. v. Martin =

- Supreme Court of the United States

Argued January 17, 2001 Decided May 29, 2001
- Full case name: PGA Tour, Inc. v. Martin
- Citations: 532 U.S. 661 (more) 121 S. Ct. 1879; 149 L. Ed. 2d 904; 2001 U.S. LEXIS 4115
- Decision: Opinion

Case history
- Prior: Partial summary judgment granted, Martin v. PGA Tour, Inc., 984 F. Supp. 1320 (D. Or. 1998); permanent injunction granted, 994 F. Supp. 1242 (D. Or. 1998), affirmed, 204 F.3d 994 (9th Cir. 2000); cert. granted, 530 U.S. 1306 (2000).

Holding
- The PGA Tour is required to adhere to the Americans with Disabilities Act.

Court membership
- Chief Justice William Rehnquist Associate Justices John P. Stevens · Sandra Day O'Connor; Antonin Scalia · Anthony Kennedy; David Souter · Clarence Thomas; Ruth Bader Ginsburg · Stephen Breyer

Case opinions
- Majority: Stevens, joined by Rehnquist, O'Connor, Kennedy, Souter, Ginsburg, Breyer
- Dissent: Scalia, joined by Thomas

Laws applied
- Americans with Disabilities Act of 1990

PGA Tour, Inc. v. Martin, 532 U.S. 661 (2001), was a decision by the Supreme Court of the United States involving the applicability of the Americans with Disabilities Act of 1990 to professional golf tours.

The PGA Tour, the main organizer of professional golf tours in the United States, had required all golfers to walk between shots during the third stage of its qualifying tournament, which it argued was an important aspect of the game. Golfer Casey Martin, whose circulatory condition impaired his ability to walk, sued the PGA Tour under the ADA, asserting that it must accommodate his disability by allowing him to use a golf cart. The Supreme Court ruled for Martin in a 7–2 decision.

== Decision ==
The Supreme Court ruled in favor of Martin in a 7–2 decision. The court found that the PGA Tour should be viewed as a commercial enterprise operating in the entertainment industry for the economic benefit of its members rather than as a private club. It agreed with the Magistrate Judge Thomas Coffin that the statutory definition of public accommodation included a "golf course", rejecting the Tour's argument that its competitions are only places of public accommodation in the areas open to spectators. The operator of a public accommodation could not, in Judge Coffin's view, create private enclaves within the facility "… and thus relegate the ADA to hop-scotch areas." The finding was originally upheld by the United States Court for the Ninth Circuit.

Justice Antonin Scalia wrote a dissent that concluded by referencing Kurt Vonnegut's story "Harrison Bergeron."

== Aftermath ==
Martin has failed to make it through the PGA Tour Q-school since 2000. He has played in several PGA Tour events, notably in 2004. He lives in Eugene, Oregon and is the men's head golf coach at the University of Oregon. Martin would go on to have his leg amputated, above the knee, in 2021.
