= Nguyen v. INS =

- Supreme Court of the United States

Argued January 9, 2001 Decided June 11, 2001
- Full case name: Tuan Anh Nguyen and Joseph Boulais v. Immigration and Naturalization Service
- Docket no.: 99-2071
- Citations: 533 U.S. 53 (more) 121 S. Ct. 2053; 150 L. Ed. 2d 115

Case history
- Prior: Appeal from BIA rejected, 208 F.3d 528 (5th Cir. 2000); cert. granted, 530 U.S. 1305 (2000)
- Subsequent: Petition for writ of habeas corpus rejected, 400 F.3d 255 (5th Cir. 2005)

Holding
- A law providing narrower standards for United States citizenship for a child born abroad out of wedlock to an American father, as opposed to an American mother, was justified by important government interests and did not violate the equal protection guarantee of the Fifth Amendment.

Court membership
- Chief Justice William Rehnquist Associate Justices John P. Stevens · Sandra Day O'Connor; Antonin Scalia · Anthony Kennedy; David Souter · Clarence Thomas; Ruth Bader Ginsburg · Stephen Breyer

Case opinions
- Majority: Kennedy, joined by Rehnquist, Stevens, Scalia, Thomas
- Concurrence: Scalia, joined by Thomas
- Dissent: O'Connor, joined by Souter, Ginsburg, Breyer

Laws applied
- U.S. Const. amend. V; Immigration and Nationality Act of 1952, sec. 309 (8 U.S.C. § 1409)

Nguyen v. INS, 533 U.S. 53 (2001), was a United States Supreme Court case in which the Court upheld the validity of laws relating to U.S. citizenship at birth for children born outside the United States, out of wedlock, to an American parent. The Court declined to overturn a more restrictive citizenship requirement applying to a foreign-born child of an American father and a non-American mother who was not married to the father, as opposed to a child born to an American mother under similar circumstances.

== Background ==
Section 309 of the Immigration and Nationality Act of 1952 as amended (codified as section 1409 of Title 8 of the United States Code) deals with U.S. citizenship for children born outside the U.S., out of wedlock, to an American parent. If a child is born abroad, out of wedlock, to an American mother, the child automatically acquires U.S. citizenship at birth, provided the mother had "previously been physically present in the United States or one of its outlying possessions for a continuous period of one year". An illegitimate foreign-born child of an American father and an alien mother, on the other hand, is recognized as a U.S. citizen only if a much more complex and stringent set of conditions are met: the father's paternity must be convincingly established prior to the child's 18th birthday, and the father must also agree in writing to provide financial support to the child until he or she reaches age 18.

Tuan Anh Nguyen was born in Vietnam to an American father and a Vietnamese mother who were not married. He moved to the United States with his father and became a legal permanent resident of the U.S. at age six, but his father did not attempt to establish any claim of U.S. citizenship for the boy. At age 22, Nguyen pleaded guilty to sexual assault; this made him subject to deportation based on his criminal record.

Nguyen's father obtained evidence of parentage in an attempt to have his son recognized as a U.S. citizen, but his efforts were rejected by the Immigration and Naturalization Service (INS) because 8 U.S.C. § 1409 required any such evidence to have been presented before the child's 18th birthday. Nguyen—together with his father—mounted a court challenge to the law, claiming that 8 U.S.C. § 1409 was unconstitutionally discriminatory because it imposed stricter requirements for a foreign-born illegitimate child of an American father than would have applied if his American parent had been his mother.

== Holding ==
The Supreme Court rejected Nguyen's arguments and upheld the law denying him citizenship, holding by a 5–4 majority that 8 U.S.C. § 1409 was consistent with the equal protection principle, applied through the Due Process Clause of the Fifth Amendment to the Constitution. In the opinion of the Court (written by Associate Justice Anthony Kennedy), the Court ruled that although the statute was discriminatory, "it serve[d] important governmental objectives and that the discriminatory means employed [were] substantially related to the achievement of those objectives". The Court found that Congress' decision to impose different requirements on unmarried fathers and unmarried mothers was "based on the significant difference between their respective relationships to the potential citizen at the time of birth". First, the Court noted that whereas a mother's biological relationship to her child is easily verified and documented, the same cannot be said of the father. Second, the Court concluded that the law was designed "to ensure that the child and citizen parent have some demonstrated opportunity to develop... a relationship... that consists of the real, everyday ties that provide a connection between child and citizen parent and, in turn, the United States"—something that was inherent in the case of an American mother and her child, but not inevitable in the case of a single father.

Even though Nguyen's father had submitted DNA evidence proving the father-son relationship, the Court noted that "scientific proof of biological paternity does nothing, by itself, to ensure contact between father and child during the child's minority". In the end, the Court held that Congress was "well within its authority in refusing, absent proof of at least the opportunity for the development of a relationship between citizen parent and child, to commit this country to embracing a child as a citizen".

A concurring opinion by Associate Justices Antonin Scalia and Clarence Thomas proposed that the Supreme Court simply did not have the power of "conferral of citizenship on a basis other than that prescribed by Congress". The dissent (written by Associate Justice Sandra Day O'Connor) concluded that the INS "[had] not shown an exceedingly persuasive justification for the sex-based classification... because it [had] failed to establish at least that the classification substantially relate[d] to the achievement of important government objectives", and on that basis the minority would have ruled in Nguyen's favor.

An earlier case, Miller v. Albright, 523 U.S. 420 (1998), suggested a similar conclusion to that given in Nguyen v. INS, but had failed to support it by a clear majority.

== Aftermath ==
After the Supreme Court decision, the INS attempted to deport Nguyen, but was unsuccessful because of a Vietnamese government policy barring the repatriation of convicts from the United States.

Nguyen and his father sought to reopen the deportation proceedings, and when this effort was unsuccessful, appealed to the courts again, claiming that the refusal by the Board of Immigration Appeals to reopen Nguyen's case deprived him of due process of law and denied the father's right to enjoy his son's companionship. This appeal was rejected by the Fifth Circuit Court of Appeals in 2005.
