= 2000 term per curiam opinions of the Supreme Court of the United States =

The Supreme Court of the United States handed down nine per curiam opinions during its 2000 term, which began October 2, 2000 and concluded September 30, 2001. (Note: The description of one opinion has been omitted: in District of Columbia v. Tri County Industries, Inc., 531 U.S. 287 (2001), the Court dismissed the writ of certiorari as improvidently granted.)

Because per curiam decisions are issued from the Court as an institution, these opinions all lack the attribution of authorship or joining votes to specific justices. All justices on the Court at the time the decision was handed down are assumed to have participated and concurred unless otherwise noted.

== Court membership ==
Chief Justice: William Rehnquist

Associate Justices: John Paul Stevens, Sandra Day O'Connor, Antonin Scalia, Anthony Kennedy, David Souter, Clarence Thomas, Ruth Bader Ginsburg, Stephen Breyer

== Sinkfield v. Kelley ==
- Full caption: Darryl Sinkfield, et al. v. Peggy C. Kelley, et al.
- Citations: 531 U.S. 28; 121 S. Ct. 446; 148 L. Ed. 2d 329; 2000 U.S. LEXIS 8081
- Prior history: Injunction granted, 96 F. Supp. 2d 1301 (M.D. Ala. 2000)
- Full text of the opinion: Findlaw · Justia · Google Scholar · Lexis

531 U.S. 28
Decided November 27, 2000.
District Court for the Middle District of Alabama vacated and remanded.

The Court held that the appellees lacked standing under Hays because they neither alleged nor produced any evidence that any of them was assigned to his or her district as a direct result of having personally been subjected to a racial classification

The appellees were Alabama voters residing in majority-white districts adjacent to majority-minority districts. All of the districts were created under a state redistricting plan whose purpose was maximizing the number of majority-minority districts. Appellants were a group of African-American voters, whose initial state lawsuit resulted in the adoption of the plan at issue, and state officials. Appellees brought suit in Federal District Court challenging their own districts as the products of unconstitutional racial gerrymandering.

== Bush v. Palm Beach County Canvassing Board ==
- Full caption: George W. Bush v. Palm Beach County Canvassing Board, et al.
- Citations: 531 U.S. 70; 121 S. Ct. 471; 148 L. Ed. 2d 366; 2000 U.S. LEXIS 8087; 69 U.S.L.W. 4020; 2000 Cal. Daily Op. Service 9599; 14 Fla. L. Weekly Fed. S 19
- Prior history: Motion denied, Fla. Cir. Ct., Nov. 17, 2000; matter certified to Florida Supreme Court, Fla. Ct. App.; sub nom. Palm Beach County Canvassing Bd. v. Harris, 772 So. 2d 1220 (Fla. 2000); cert. granted, 531 U.S. 1004 (2000)
- Laws applied: U.S. Const. art. II; U.S. Const. amend. XIV; 3 U.S.C. § 5
- Full text of the opinion: Findlaw · Justia · Lexis

531 U.S. 70
Argued December 1, 2000.
Decided December 4, 2000.
Supreme Court of Florida vacated and remanded for clarification.

== Bush v. Gore ==
- Full caption: George W. Bush and Richard Cheney v. Albert Gore, Jr., et al.
- Citations: 531 U.S. 98; 121 S. Ct. 525; 148 L. Ed. 2d 388; 2000 U.S. LEXIS 8430; 69 U.S.L.W. 4029; 2000 Cal. Daily Op. Service 9879; 2000 Colo. J. C.A.R. 6606; 14 Fla. L. Weekly Fed. S 26
- Prior history: Judgment for defendant, Fla. Cir. Ct.; matter certified to Florida Supreme Court, Fla. Ct. App.; aff'd in part, rev'd in part, sub nom. Palm Beach County Canvassing Bd. v. Harris, 772 So. 2d 1273 (2000); cert. granted, stay granted, 531 U.S. 1036 (2000)
- Laws applied: U.S. Const. art. II; U.S. Const. amend. XIV; 3 U.S.C. § 5
- Full text of the opinion: Wikisource Findlaw · Justia

531 U.S. 98
Argued December 11, 2000.
Decided December 12, 2000.
Supreme Court of Florida reversed and remanded.

Rehnquist filed a concurrence, joined by Scalia and Thomas. Stevens filed a dissent, joined by Ginsburg and Breyer. Souter filed a dissent, joined by Breyer in full, and Stevens and Ginsburg as to all but Part III. Ginsburg filed a dissent, joined by Stevens in full, and Souter and Breyer as to Part I. Breyer filed a dissent, joined by Stevens and Ginsburg except as to Part I–A–1, and by Souter as to Part I.

== Fiore v. White ==
- Full caption: William Fiore v. Gregory White, Warden
- Citations: 531 U.S. 225; 121 S.Ct. 712; 148 L.Ed.2d 629
- Prior history: Petition granted, W.D. Penn.; rev'd, 149 F.3d 221 (3d Cir. 1998); question certified, 528 U.S. 23 (1999); reply to certified question, 757 A. 2d 842 (Pa. 2000)
- Full text of the opinion: Findlaw · Justia

531 U.S. 225
Decided January 9, 2001.
Third Circuit reversed and remanded.

The Due Process Clause forbids a State to convict a person of a crime without proving the crime's elements beyond a reasonable doubt, as shown in Jackson v. Virginia. Here, failure to possess a permit is a basic element of the crime of which Fiore was convicted, and the parties agree that the Commonwealth presented no evidence to prove that element.

== District of Columbia v. Tri County Industries, Inc. ==
- Full caption: District of Columbia v. Tri County Industries, Inc.
- Citations: 531 U.S. 287
- Full text of the opinion: Findlaw

531 U.S. 287
Decided January 17, 2001.
Certiorari denied as improvidently granted.

== Ohio v. Reiner ==
- Full caption: Ohio v. Matthew Reiner
- Citations: 532 U.S. 17
- Prior history: Defendant convicted; rev'd, Ohio Ct. App.; aff'd, 731 N.E. 2d 662 (Ohio )
- Full text of the opinion: Findlaw · Justia

532 U.S. 17
Decided March 19, 2001.
Supreme Court of Ohio reversed and remanded.

The Court's opinion reiterated that the protection of the Fifth Amendment is for the innocent as well as the wrongdoer from Grunewald v. United States.

In Grunewald, we recognized that truthful responses of an innocent witness, as well as those of a wrongdoer, may provide the government with incriminating evidence from the speaker's own mouth.

== Clark County School Dist. v. Breeden ==
- Full caption: Clark County School Dist. v. Shirley A. Breeden
- Citations: 532 U.S. 268
- Prior history: Summary judgment granted to defendant, No. CV-S-97-365-DWH(RJJ) (D. Nev., Feb. 9, 1999); rev'd, No. 99-15522, 2000 WL 991821 (9th Cir. July 19, 2000) (per curiam) (unpublished); judgt. order reported at 232 F.3d 893 (9th Cir. 2000)
- Full text of the opinion: Justia

532 U.S. 268
Decided April 23, 2001.
Ninth Circuit reversed.

Holding: Plaintiff's complaint about a report of a sex-related comment was not protected. No reasonable person could have believed that this particular single incident would violate Title VII standard.

== Major League Baseball Players Assn. v. Garvey ==
- Full caption: Major League Baseball Players Association v. Steve Garvey
- Citations: 532 U.S. 504
- Prior history: Motion to vacate arbitration award denied, No. CV-97-05643-WJR, C.D. Cal.; rev'd, sub nom. Garvey v. Roberts, 203 F. 3d 580 (9th Cir. 2000); on remand, case referred to arbitration, No. CV-97-05643-WJR, C.D. Cal.; rev'd, No. 00-56080, 2000 WL 1801383 (9th Cir. Dec. 7, 2000) (unpublished), judgt. order reported at 243 F.3d 547 (9th Cir. 2000)
- Full text of the opinion: Justia

532 U.S. 504
Decided May 14, 2001.
Ninth Circuit reversed and remanded.

Ginsburg filed a concurrence. Stevens filed a dissent.

The Court held that the lower court erred when it directed the judgment in favor of Garvey and overruled the arbitrator.

Major League Baseball Players Association (Association) filed grievances against the Major League Baseball Clubs (Clubs), claiming the Clubs had colluded in the market for free-agent services, in violation of the industry's collective-bargaining agreement.

Judicial review of a labor-arbitration decision pursuant to such an agreement is very limited. Courts are not authorized to review the arbitrator's decision on the merits despite allegations that the decision rests on factual errors or misinterprets the parties' agreement... It is only when the arbitrator strays from interpretation and application of the agreement and effectively 'dispenses his own brand of industrial justice' that his decision may be unenforceable.

== Arkansas v. Sullivan ==
- Full caption: Arkansas v. Kenneth Andrew Sullivan
- Citations: 532 U.S. 769
- Prior history: Motion to suppress evidence granted; aff'd, 11 S.W. 3d 526 (Ark. 2000); aff'd on rehearing, 16 S.W. 3d 551 (Ark. 2000)
- Full text of the opinion: Justia

532 U.S. 769
Decided May 29, 2001.
Supreme Court of Arkansas reversed and remanded.

State supreme courts cannot interpret and establish greater protections under the federal Constitution than the Supreme Court has.

Ginsburg filed a concurrence.

== See also ==
- List of United States Supreme Court cases, volume 531
- List of United States Supreme Court cases, volume 532
