= Whitman v. American Trucking Ass'ns =

Whitman v. American Trucking Associations, Inc.
- Supreme Court of the United States

Argued November 7, 2000 Decided February 27, 2001
- Full case name: Christine Todd Whitman, Administrator of Environmental Protection Agency, et al. v. American Trucking Associations, Inc., et al.
- Citations: 531 U.S. 457 (more) 121 S. Ct. 903; 149 L. Ed. 2d 1; 2001 U.S. LEXIS 1952
- Argument: Oral argument

Case history
- Prior: 175 F.3d 1027 (D.C. Cir. 1999), opinion modified on rehearing en banc, 195 F.3d 4 (D.C. Cir. 1999); cert. granted, 529 U.S. 1129, 530 U.S. 1202 (2000).

Holding
- (1) The Clean Air Act properly delegated legislative power to the Environmental Protection Agency. (2) The Environmental Protection Agency cannot consider implementation costs in setting primary and secondary national ambient air quality standards.

Court membership
- Chief Justice William Rehnquist Associate Justices John P. Stevens · Sandra Day O'Connor; Antonin Scalia · Anthony Kennedy; David Souter · Clarence Thomas; Ruth Bader Ginsburg · Stephen Breyer

Case opinions
- Majority: Scalia, joined by Rehnquist, O'Connor, Thomas, Kennedy, Ginsburg; Stevens, Souter (except part III); Breyer (except part II)
- Concurrence: Thomas
- Concurrence: Stevens (in part), joined by Souter
- Concurrence: Breyer (in part)

Laws applied
- Section 109 of the Clean Air Act (CAA)

Whitman v. American Trucking Associations, Inc., 531 U.S. 457 (2001), was a decision of the United States Supreme Court reviewing a challenge to the Environmental Protection Agency's promulgation of National Ambient Air Quality Standards (NAAQS) under Administrator Christine Todd Whitman, brought by the American Trucking Association, other private companies, and the states of Michigan, Ohio, and West Virginia. The Court considered whether relevant provisions of the Clean Air Act violated the nondelegation doctrine by vesting legislative power, among the core powers of the United States Congress, in the Administrator; and whether the Administrator could weigh implementation costs in setting NAAQS. In rejecting the latter, the Court remarked that Congress does not "hide elephants in mouseholes."

== Background ==
Section 109(b)(1) of the Clean Air Act instructed the EPA to set "ambient air quality standards the attainment and maintenance of which in the judgment of the Administrator, based on [the] criteria [documents of Section 108] and allowing an adequate margin of safety, are requisite to protect the public health." The D.C. Circuit Court of Appeals had decided that the standard making procedure delegated by Congress to the EPA to set air quality was an unconstitutional delegation in contravention of Article I, Section I, of the US Constitution because the EPA had interpreted the statute to provide "no intelligible principle" to guide the agency's exercise of authority. It also found that the EPA could not consider the economic cost of implementing a national ambient air quality standard.

== Decision ==
In an opinion written by Justice Antonin Scalia, the Supreme Court affirmed in part and reversed in part the Court of Appeals' decision. The Court affirmed that the text of Section 109(b) unambiguously barred cost considerations from the NAAQS-setting process. That is, the Court wrote, Congress "does not alter the fundamental details of a regulatory scheme in vague terms or ancillary provisions—it does not, one might say, hide elephants in mouseholes." The Court wrote, "Whether the statute delegates legislative power is a question for the courts, and an agency's voluntary self-denial has no bearing upon the answer." The Court determined that the scope of discretion that Section 109(b)(1) allowed was well within the outer limits of nondelegation precedents. The Court concluded this based on prior holdings, noting it had only twice found an intelligible principle lacking in a statutory delegation: one which contained "literally no guidance for the exercise of discretion," and the other "conferred authority to regulate the entire economy on the basis of no more precise a standard than stimulating the economy by assuring 'fair competition.'" Consequently, the Court remanded the case for the Court of Appeals to reinterpret the statute that would avoid a delegation of legislative power.

=== Concurrences ===
Justice Clarence Thomas wrote a separate concurrence. He was not sure that the intelligible principle criterion served to prevent all cessions of legislative power. He believed that there are cases in which the principle itself is intelligible but the significance of the delegated decision is simply too great for the decision to be called anything other than legislative. He stated that he would be willing to reconsider the delegation precedents in the future to determine whether delegation jurisprudence has strayed too far from Founders' understanding of separation of powers. The Court also held that EPA's implementation policy constituted a final agency action subject to judicial review and that two statutory provisions for ozone, Subpart I and Subpart 2, were seemingly in conflict and EPA must reconcile these provisions on remand.

Justice John Paul Stevens, joined by Justice David Souter, held that Section 109(b)(1) constitutionally delegated Congress's legislative power to the EPA Administrator for NAAQS promulgation, stressing a functional view of separation of powers.

== See also ==
- List of United States Supreme Court cases, volume 531
- List of United States Supreme Court cases

== Sources ==
- Levy, Robert A.; Mellor, William H. (2008). "Lawmaking by Administrative Agencies". The Dirty Dozen: How Twelve Supreme Court Cases Radically Expanded Government and Eroded Freedom. New York: Sentinel. pp. 67–88. ISBN 978-1-59523-050-8.
