= List of United States Supreme Court cases, volume 531 =

This is a list of all the United States Supreme Court cases from volume 531 of the United States Reports:

Case name	Citation	Date decided
Arizona v. California	531 U.S. 1	October 10, 2000
California gets a maximum of 50% up to 4,400,000 acre-feet (5.4 km^{3}) of Colorado River water a year or less according to certain formula; Nevada gets 4% and Arizona gets the remainder
Artuz v. Bennett	531 U.S. 4	2000
An application for state postconviction relief containing procedurally barred claims is filed within the meaning of the AEDPA.
Cleveland v. United States	531 U.S. 12	2000
"Property" for the purposes of federal law does not include state video poker licenses.
Sinkfield v. Kelley	531 U.S. 28	2000
The plaintiffs lacked standing under Hays because they neither alleged nor produced any evidence that any of them was assigned to his or her district as a direct result of having personally been subjected to a racial classification.
Indianapolis v. Edmond	531 U.S. 32	2000
Police may not conduct roadblocks "whose primary purpose is to detect evidence of ordinary criminal wrongdoing." Such roadblocks must have a specific primary purpose, such as keeping roadways safe from impaired drivers, or enforcing border security.
Eastern Associated Coal Corp. v. Mine Workers	531 U.S. 57	2000
Public policy considerations do not require courts to refuse to enforce an arbitration award ordering an employer to reinstate an employee truck driver who twice tested positive for marijuana.
Bush v. Palm Beach County Canvassing Bd.	531 U.S. 70	2000
Decision vacated and case remanded for clarification
Green Tree Financial Corp.-Ala. v. Randolph	531 U.S. 79	2000
(1) An order compelling arbitration pursuant to an agreement is a "final decision with respect to arbitration". (2) An arbitration agreement that is silent on arbitration costs and fees is enforceable.
Bush v. Gore	531 U.S. 98	2000
In the circumstances of this case, any manual recount of votes seeking to meet the December 12 "safe harbor" deadline would be unconstitutional under the Equal Protection Clause of the Fourteenth Amendment.
Solid Waste Agency of Northern Cook Cty. v. Army Corps of Engineers	531 U.S. 159	2001
The migratory bird rule exceeds the scope of the Clean Water Act, as interpreted by the EPA.
Glover v. United States	531 U.S. 198	2001
A significant increase in a prison sentence is not required in order to show prejudice in a claim for ineffective assistance of counsel.
Gitlitz v. Commissioner	531 U.S. 206	2001
The Internal Revenue Code permits taxpayers to increase bases in their S corporation stock by the amount of an S corporation's discharge of indebtedness excluded from gross income and the increase occurs before taxpayers are required to reduce the S corporation's tax attributes.
Fiore v. White	531 U.S. 225	2001
The Due Process Clause forbids a State to convict a person of a crime without proving the crime's elements beyond a reasonable doubt. Here, failure to possess a permit is a basic element of the crime of which Fiore was convicted, and the parties agree that the Commonwealth presented no evidence to prove that element.
Lopez v. Davis	531 U.S. 230	2001
The Bureau of Prisons regulation does not require consideration of the non-violent nature of the underlying conviction.
Seling v. Young	531 U.S. 250	2001
An "as-applied" challenge to a civil commitment statute on the grounds that it is punitive does not change the civil nature of the detention; there is no violation of Double Jeopardy.
City News & Novelty, Inc. v. Waukesha	531 U.S. 278	2001
The writ of certiorari is dismissed as moot due to the store withdrawing its application.
District of Columbia v. Tri County Industries, Inc.	531 U.S. 287	2001
Dismissed as improvidently granted.
Brentwood Academy v. Tennessee Secondary School Athletic Assn.	531 U.S. 288	2001
A statewide association, incorporated to regulate interscholastic athletic competition among public and private schools, is regarded as engaging in state action when it enforces a rule against a member school.
Director of Revenue of Mo. v. CoBank ACB	531 U.S. 316	2001
The National Bank for Cooperatives, which Congress has designated as a federally chartered instrumentality of the United States, is not exempt from state income taxation.
Illinois v. McArthur	531 U.S. 326	2001
Police officers who had probable cause to believe an individual was hiding drugs in his home, and who blocked the individual from entering while awaiting a search warrant, did not violate the Fourth Amendment.
Buckman Co. v. Plaintiffs' Legal Comm.	531 U.S. 341	2001
Plaintiffs' claims are pre-empted under the Federal Food, Drug and Cosmetic Act.
Board of Trustees of Univ. of Ala. v. Garrett	531 U.S. 356	2001
Congress's enforcement powers under the Fourteenth Amendment to the United States Constitution did not extend to the abrogation of state sovereign immunity under the Eleventh Amendment if the discrimination was rationally based on a disability.
Central Green Co. v. United States	531 U.S. 425	2001
The term 'flood or flood waters' within the Flood Control Act of 1928 includes water that is released for the purpose of flood control.
Lewis v. Lewis & Clark Marine, Inc.	531 U.S. 438	2001
A District Court did not abuse discretion when it dissolved an injunction under the Limitation of Liability Act, which prevented a seaman from suing a vessel owner in state court.
Whitman v. American Trucking Assns., Inc.	531 U.S. 457	2001
(1) The Clean Air Act properly delegated legislative power to the Environmental Protection Agency. (2) The Environmental Protection Agency cannot consider implementation costs in setting primary and secondary national ambient air quality standards.
Semtek v. Lockheed Martin	531 U.S. 497	2001
The claim preclusive effect of a federal judgment on a claim over which subject matter jurisdiction is based solely on diversity is determined by the common law of the state in which the federal district court rendering the decision is located. The Maryland action is not precluded just because a California court dismissed the diversity action.
Cook v. Gralike	531 U.S. 510	2001
A constitutional amendment in the state of Missouri that placed a warning label on ballots next to the names of any and all candidates who did not support legislative term limits for members is unconstitutional because it sought to influence the results of elections. The power that is granted by the Elections Clause to the Constitution of the United States to the states is only meant to apply to the procedural mechanisms of elections.
Legal Services Corp. v. Velazquez	531 U.S. 533	2001
A restriction on advocacy by the Legal Services Corporation (LSC) seeking to change welfare law is an unconstitutional viewpoint restriction even though the LSC is a quasi-government entity.
