= Lopez v. Davis =

- Supreme Court of the United States

Argued October 30, 2000 Decided January 10, 2001
- Full case name: Christopher A. Lopez, Petitioner v. Randy J. Davis, Warden, et al.
- Citations: 531 U.S. 230 (more) 121 S. Ct. 714; 148 L. Ed. 2d 635

Case history
- Prior: Affirmed, 186 F.3d 1092 (8th Cir. 2000)

Holding
- The Bureau of Prisons regulation does not require consideration of the non-violent nature of the underlying conviction.

Court membership
- Chief Justice William Rehnquist Associate Justices John P. Stevens · Sandra Day O'Connor; Antonin Scalia · Anthony Kennedy; David Souter · Clarence Thomas; Ruth Bader Ginsburg · Stephen Breyer

Case opinions
- Majority: Ginsburg, joined by O'Connor, Scalia, Souter, Thomas, Breyer
- Dissent: Stevens, joined by Rehnquist, Kennedy

Laws applied
- Bureau of Prisons Regulations

Lopez v. Davis, 531 U.S. 230 (2001), was a United States Supreme Court case decided in 2001. The case concerned the validity of a Bureau of Prisons regulation which lowered prisoners' sentences for completion of a substance abuse program. The statute however restricted this credit to those who did not engage in a felony aided by a firearm. The Court upheld the regulation over the dissent of three Justices.

== Background ==
In 1995, the Bureau of Prisons published a rule to implement "early release incentives". Only prisoners who did not commit a "crime of violence" would be eligible for the program. The Bureau defined this to include a drug trafficking conviction which received a sentence increase due to the use of a weapon during the commission of that crime. After split decisions by circuit Courts of Appeal over the vagueness of the regulation, the Bureau published a revised one in 1997. This gave broader discretion to the Director of the Bureau to grant these term reductions.

Christopher A. Lopez applied for the program but was rejected. Lopez had been convicted of possession with intent to distribute while possessing a firearm at the time of his offense. The Bureau of Prisons defined this a "crime of violence".

The United States District Court for the District of South Dakota reversed a decision by the Bureau of Prisons that Lopez would not be subject to term reductions. Finding that underlying convictions that were "nonviolent" should be reconsidered for the program by the Bureau of Prisons, the District Court reasoned Lopez was a candidate for term reductions. The Court of Appeals for the Eighth Circuit reversed, and Lopez appealed.

== Opinion of the Court ==
=== Majority opinion ===
Justice Ruth Bader Ginsburg delivered the opinion of the Court, affirming the Eighth Circuit and finding Lopez ineligible for the program. Justice Ginsburg framed the question as whether the Bureau has "discretion to delineate...those whose current offense is a felony involving a firearm".

Ginsburg argued that the statutory language provided the Director of the Bureau of Prisons the authority to make these sentence distinctions as the text used the word "may" consider rather than "shall". Further, the argument advanced by Lopez would restrict the new 1997 regulation, which was intended to provide broader authority to the Director.

Having held the Bureau's interpretation of the statute as proper, the Court concluded by finding that Lopez was not eligible for the program.

=== Stevens' dissent ===
Justice John Paul Stevens wrote a dissenting opinion, joined by Chief Justice William Rehnquist and Justice Anthony Kennedy. Stevens argued that the phrasing of "may be reduced" was a command by Congress for the Director of Prisons to consider cases where the underlying conviction was not violent. He concluded that the Bureau was free to make these distinctions, so long as it held to Congress's intent which he saw as aiding Lopez's arguments.

== See also ==
- Eighth Amendment to the United States Constitution
- Appeal
