= Seling v. Young =

- Supreme Court of the United States

Argued October 31, 2000 Decided January 17, 2001
- Full case name: Mark Seling, Superintendent, Special Commitment Center, Petitioner v. Andre Brigham Young
- Citations: 531 U.S. 250 (more) 121 S. Ct. 727; 148 L. Ed. 2d 734

Case history
- Prior: Conviction and commitment affirmed sub. nom. In re: Young 122 Wn.2d 1, 857 P.2d 989 (1993); writ of certiorary granted sub. nom. Young v. Weston, 898 F. Supp. 744 (W.D. Wash. (1995); remanded in light of Kansas v. Hendricks, 122 F.3d 38 (9th Cir. 1997); petition denied, n° CV-94-00480C (W.D. Wash. February 10, 1998); reversed and remanded in part, 176 F.3d 1196 (9th Cir. 1999); order amended and rehearing denied, 192 F.3d 870 (9th Cir. 1999); certiorari granted, 529 U.S. 1017 (2000)

Holding
- An "as-applied" challenge to a civil commitment statute on the grounds that it is punitive does not change the civil nature of the detention; there is no violation of Double Jeopardy.

Court membership
- Chief Justice William Rehnquist Associate Justices John P. Stevens · Sandra Day O'Connor; Antonin Scalia · Anthony Kennedy; David Souter · Clarence Thomas; Ruth Bader Ginsburg · Stephen Breyer

Case opinions
- Majority: O'Connor, joined by Rehnquist, Scalia, Kennedy, Souter, Ginsburg, Breyer
- Concurrence: Scalia, joined by Souter
- Concurrence: Thomas
- Dissent: Stevens

Laws applied
- Double Jeopardy Clause

Seling v. Young, 531 U.S. 250 (2001), was a United States Supreme Court case decided in 2001. The case concerned a challenge to a civil commitment statute for sexual predators in Washington state. The petitioner tried to differentiate this case from previous ones before the Supreme Court which upheld civil commitment statutes. The Court rejected the challenge to the law over the objection of a single Justice.

== Background ==
In 1990, Washington state passed the Community Protection Act of 1990 which authorized the civil commitment of "sexually violent predators", persons considered to have a "mental abnormality" that makes them likely to engage in sexually violent acts. Under this law, a person who has been convicted of a sexually violent offense and is scheduled for release from jail or prison is instead subject to civil commitment, if found to be a "sexually violent predator". Andre Brigham Young was confined under the provisions of the Act. He challenged his commitment in state court, arguing that the conditions of his commitment were punitive and that he was, in effect, serving a second criminal sentence. After losing in his suit, he began a habeas action in federal court.

The Ninth Circuit Court of Appeals concluded that Young's challenge to the law was allowed, even though the United States Supreme Court had decided in 1997, in Kansas v. Hendricks, that a similar Kansas law was constitutional. The Ninth Circuit distinguished the cases, saying this case challenged the law "as applied", and was specific to the potentially 'punitive' nature of the Washington law.

The state appealed and the Supreme Court granted review.

== Opinion of the Court ==
Justice Sandra Day O'Connor delivered the opinion of the Court, which disagreed with the Ninth Circuit as to the nature of the challenge to the Washington statute. O'Connor argued that because the Washington Supreme Court had already held the law as entirely 'civil', Young's contention that the law was 'punitive' was functionally a full "facial challenge". A facial challenge takes issue with the entire law, and such challenges had already been dismissed by the Supreme Court.

O'Connor stressed that the decision "does not mean that respondent and others...have no remedy for the alleged conditions at the Center". Instead, committed persons could challenge the state of conditions in accordance with the procedures established under the Washington law. Lastly, the Court dismissed the challenge to the law as the act in question was entirely 'civil'.

=== Scalia's concurrence ===
Justice Antonin Scalia wrote a concurrence in the decision of the majority with which Justice Souter joined. He wrote simply to "dissociate [himself] from any implication that there is [an] open question" about the ex post facto and Double Jeopardy Clause challenges to the Washington law. Scalia wrote that the purely civil nature of the commitment statute blocked any Fifth Amendment challenge, which only relate to criminal laws.

=== Thomas' concurrence ===
Justice Clarence Thomas concurred in the judgment of the Court, but not the reasoning of the majority. His opinion rested on two primary points: first, that just because a civil statute is implemented in a 'criminal-like' manner does not change the nature of the statute; second, a 'first instance' challenge and a subsequent challenge is a distinction "without a difference". Thus, he disagreed with the concept of 'as-applied' challenges to state laws.

=== Stevens' dissent ===
Justice John Paul Stevens wrote a lone dissenting opinion. He argued that the detention of a person in the manner Washington state has done is not "necessarily civil". Stevens argued that the punitive nature of the detention makes the sanction criminal. Thus, he saw a violation of the Double Jeopardy Clause as "conditions of confinement" were placed twice for the defendant—once in prison and once in civil commitment.

Stevens concluded by saying he would have affirmed the decision of the Ninth Circuit.

== See also ==
- Fifth Amendment to the United States Constitution
