= Cook v. Gralike =

- Supreme Court of the United States

Argued November 6, 2000 Decided February 28, 2001
- Full case name: Rebecca McDowell Cook v. Donald J. Gralike and Mike Harman
- Citations: 531 U.S. 510 (more) 121 S. Ct. 1029; 149 L. Ed. 2d 44; 2001 U.S. LEXIS 1953; 69 U.S.L.W. 4150; 2001 Cal. Daily Op. Service 1615; 2001 Daily Journal DAR 2089; 2001 Colo. J. C.A.R. 1068; 14 Fla. L. Weekly Fed. S 119

Holding
- A constitutional amendment in the state of Missouri that placed a warning label on ballots next to the names of any and all candidates who did not support legislative term limits for members is unconstitutional because it sought to influence the results of elections. The power that is granted by the Elections Clause to the Constitution of the United States to the states is only meant to apply to the procedural mechanisms of elections.

Court membership
- Chief Justice William Rehnquist Associate Justices John P. Stevens · Sandra Day O'Connor; Antonin Scalia · Anthony Kennedy; David Souter · Clarence Thomas; Ruth Bader Ginsburg · Stephen Breyer

Case opinions
- Majority: Stevens, joined by Scalia, Kennedy, Ginsburg, Breyer; Souter (parts I, II, IV); Thomas (parts I, IV)
- Concurrence: Kennedy
- Concurrence: Thomas
- Concurrence: Rehnquist, joined by O'Connor

Cook v. Gralike, 531 U.S. 510 (2001), was a United States Supreme Court case in which the Court held that an attempt by the state of Missouri to influence Congressional elections in favor of candidates who supported term limits was unconstitutional.

== Opinion of the Court ==
Missouri had adopted a state constitutional amendment with a change that, during primary general elections, warnings would be affixed to the voting ballots of candidates that did not support term limits.

The Court held that the powers delegated to the states by the Elections Clause related only to the power over the procedural mechanisms of elections. Because this amendment sought to influence the outcome of elections, it exceeded state powers over national elections.

== See also ==
- U.S. Term Limits, Inc. v. Thornton (1995)
