= Nevada v. Hicks =

- Supreme Court of the United States

Argued March 21, 2001 Decided June 25, 2001
- Full case name: State of Nevada, et al. v. Floyd Hicks, et al.
- Citations: 533 U.S. 353 (more) 121 S. Ct. 2304; 150 L. Ed. 2d 398; 2001 U.S. LEXIS 4669

Case history
- Prior: 944 F. Supp. 1455 (D. Nev. 1996); affirmed, 196 F.3d 1020 (9th Cir. 1999); cert. granted, 531 U.S. 923 (2000).

Holding
- Tribal Courts do not have the authority to restrict or regulate state officials in investigation off-reservation violations of state law. They also lack the ability to hear claims that officials violated Tribal Law in the performance of their duties.

Court membership
- Chief Justice William Rehnquist Associate Justices John P. Stevens · Sandra Day O'Connor; Antonin Scalia · Anthony Kennedy; David Souter · Clarence Thomas; Ruth Bader Ginsburg · Stephen Breyer

Case opinions
- Majority: Scalia, joined by Rehnquist, Kennedy, Souter, Thomas, Ginsburg
- Concurrence: Souter, joined by Kennedy, Thomas
- Concurrence: Ginsburg
- Concurrence: O'Connor (in part and in judgment), joined by Stevens, Breyer
- Concurrence: Stevens (in judgment), joined by Breyer

Laws applied
- 42 U.S.C. § 1983

Nevada v. Hicks, 533 U.S. 353 (2001), is a United States Supreme Court case regarding the jurisdiction of Tribal Courts when state officials are sued by tribal members in tribal court. The Supreme Court unanimously decided that Tribal courts lack jurisdiction to decide tort claims or § 1983 claims related to State law enforcement's process on the reservation, but related to a crime that allegedly occurred off the reservation nor must the parties exhaust their claims in Tribal court before filing in federal court.

== Background ==
Hicks was a member of the Fallon Paiute-Shoshone Tribes of western Nevada and lived on tribal land. State of Nevada Game Wardens executed state and tribal search warrants for evidence that Hicks was in possession of two California Bighorn Sheep heads, a crime which had been committed off-reservation. He then filed suit in Tribal Court against the wardens and the State of Nevada for alleging trespass, abuse of process, and violation of constitutional rights under 42 U.S.C. § 1983. The Tribal Court ruled that it had jurisdiction over the tribal tort and federal civil rights claims and the Tribal Appellate court affirmed. The State of Nevada argued before Federal District Court that the Tribal Court had no such authority. The District Court agreed with the tribe, arguing that the Wardens had to exhaust immunity claims in tribal court. The Court of Appeals for the Ninth Circuit affirmed stating that the fact that Hicks lived on the reservation is enough to give the tribal courts jurisdiction.

== Opinion of the Court ==
In the unanimous decision of the Court, Justice Scalia held that the tribal courts did not have the authority over the Wardens' allegedly tortious acts. Tribal authority over non-members beyond what is necessary to protect tribal self-government is not available without express congressional delegation, since delegation did not exist the tribal court had no jurisdiction. Finally, the tribal court has no authority to regulate state officers in their official capacities, stating that tribal law hinders state law no more than state law inhibits federal law.

The Court applied Montana, which asserts that Tribes lack civil jurisdiction over conduct of nonmembers on lands where they lack the right to exclude unless (1) the nonmember entered a "consensual relationship with the Tribe or its members" or (2) the nonmember's "conduct threatens or has some direct effect on the political integrity, the economic security, or the health or welfare of the tribe." Until this case, Montana was never explicitly invoked when the conduct occurred on Indian-owned land. However, the Court finds that the "general rule of Montana applies to both Indian and non-Indian land." While "[t]he ownership status of land" may sometimes be "dispositive," in general, it "is only one factor to consider in determining whether regulation of the activities of nonmembers is necessary to protect tribal self-government or to control internal relations."

The Court found that "tribal authority to regulate state officers in executing process related to the violation, off reservation, of state laws is not essential to tribal self-government or internal relations." Analogizing to the relationship between federal law enforcement and state governments, the Court considered the abrogation of Tribal authority necessary in light of the State's "considerable" interest in effectuating searches on Indian-fee land.
