= 2000 term United States Supreme Court opinions of David Souter =

The 2000 term of the Supreme Court of the United States began October 2, 2000, and concluded September 30, 2001. This was the eleventh term of Associate Justice David Souter's tenure on the Court.
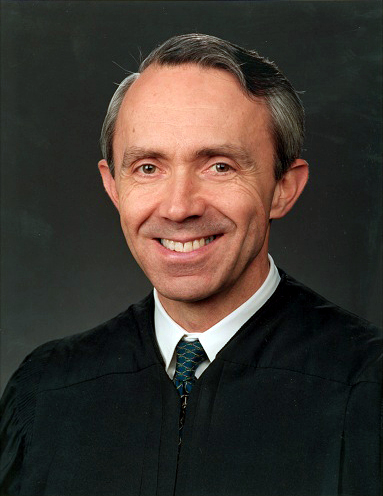

David Souter 2000 term statistics

8	Majority or plurality	4	Concurrence	0	Other
6	Dissent	2	Concurrence/dissent	Total =	20
Bench opinions = 19		Opinions relating to orders = 1		In-chambers opinions = 0
Unanimous opinions: 2		Most joined by: Ginsburg (12)		Least joined by: Scalia (2)

Type	Case	Citation	Issues	Joined by	Other opinions
	Bush v. Gore	531 U.S. 98 (2000)		Breyer; Stevens, Ginsburg (in part)	
	Brentwood Academy v. Tennessee Secondary School Athletic Assn.	531 U.S. 288 (2001)		Stevens, O'Connor, Ginsburg, Breyer	
	Illinois v. McArthur	531 U.S. 326 (2001)			
	Durden v. California	531 U.S. 1184 (2001)		Breyer	
Souter dissented from the Court's denial of certiorari.
	Department of Interior v. Klamath Water Users Protective Assn.	532 U.S. 1 (2001)		Unanimous	
	Circuit City Stores, Inc. v. Adams	532 U.S. 105 (2001)		Stevens, Ginsburg, Breyer	
	Atwater v. Lago Vista	532 U.S. 318 (2001)		Rehnquist, Scalia, Kennedy, Thomas	
	Daniels v. United States	532 U.S. 374 (2001)		Stevens, Ginsburg	
	Lackawanna County District Attorney v. Coss	532 U.S. 394 (2001)		Stevens, Ginsburg	
	Atkinson Trading Co. v. Shirley	532 U.S. 645 (2001)		Kennedy, Thomas	
	Booth v. Churner	532 U.S. 731 (2001)		Unanimous	
	United Dominion Industries, Inc. v. United States	532 U.S. 822 (2001)		Rehnquist, O'Connor, Scalia, Kennedy, Thomas, Ginsburg, Breyer	
	Good News Club v. Milford Central School	533 U.S. 98 (2001)		Ginsburg	
	Duncan v. Walker	533 U.S. 167 (2001)			
	Saucier v. Katz	532 U.S. 194 (2001)			
	United States v. Mead Corp.	533 U.S. 218 (2001)		Rehnquist, Stevens, O'Connor, Kennedy, Thomas, Ginsburg, Breyer	
	Idaho v. United States	533 U.S. 262 (2001)		Stevens, O'Connor, Ginsburg, Breyer	
	Nevada v. Hicks	533 U.S. 353 (2001)		Kennedy, Thomas	
	Federal Election Comm'n v. Colorado Republican Federal Campaign Comm	533 U.S. 431 (2001)		Stevens, O'Connor, Ginsburg, Breyer	
	Lorillard Tobacco Co. v. Reilly	533 U.S. 525 (2001)			
