= 2000 term United States Supreme Court opinions of William Rehnquist =

The 2000 term of the Supreme Court of the United States began October 2, 2000, and concluded September 30, 2001. This was the twenty-ninth term of Chief Justice William Rehnquist's tenure on the Court and the fifteenth term as Chief Justice.
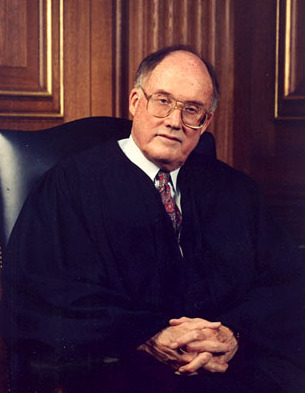

William Rehnquist 2000 term statistics

| 9 | Majority or plurality | 2 | Concurrence | 1 | Other |
| 5 | Dissent | 0 | Concurrence/dissent | Total = | 17 |
| Bench opinions = 14 | | Opinions relating to orders = 2 | | In-chambers opinions = 1 |
| Unanimous opinions: 3 | | Most joined by: Scalia (16) | | Least joined by: Stevens (4) |

| Type | Case | Citation | Issues | Joined by | Other opinions |
|---|---|---|---|---|---|
| | Indianapolis v. Edmond | 531 U.S. 32 (2000) | | Thomas; Scalia (in part) | |
| | Green Tree Financial Corp.-Ala. v. Randolph | 531 U.S. 79 (2000) | | O'Connor, Scalia, Kennedy, Thomas; Stevens, Souter, Ginsburg, Breyer (in part) | |
| | Bush v. Gore | 531 U.S. 98 (2000) | | Scalia, Thomas | |
| | Solid Waste Agency of Northern Cook Cty. v. Army Corps of Engineers | 531 U.S. 159 (2001) | | O'Connor, Scalia, Kennedy, Thomas | |
| | Buckman Co. v. Plaintiffs' Legal Comm. | 531 U.S. 341 (2001) | | O'Connor, Scalia, Kennedy, Souter, Ginsburg, Breyer | |
| | Board of Trustees of the University of Alabama v. Garrett | 531 U.S. 356 (2001) | | O'Connor, Scalia, Kennedy, Thomas | |
| | Cook v. Gralike | 531 U.S. 510 (2001) | | O'Connor | |
| | Texas v. Cobb | 532 U.S. 162 (2001) | | O'Connor, Scalia, Kennedy, Thomas | |
| | Lujan v. G & G Fire Sprinklers, Inc. | 532 U.S. 189 (2001) | | Unanimous | |
| | Bartnicki v. Vopper | 532 U.S. 514 (2001) | | Scalia, Thomas | |
| | Buckhannon Board & Care Home, Inc. v. West Virginia Dept. of Health and Human Resources | 532 U.S. 598 (2001) | | O'Connor, Scalia, Kennedy, Thomas | |
| | Atkinson Trading Co. v. Shirley | 532 U.S. 645 (2001) | | Unanimous | |
| | Florida v. Thomas | 532 U.S. 774 (2001) | | Unanimous | |
| | Elkhart v. Books | 532 U.S. 1058 (2001) | | Scalia, Thomas | |
Rehnquist dissented from the Court's denial of certiorari.
| | Idaho v. United States | 533 U.S. 262 (2001) | | Scalia, Kennedy, Thomas | |
| | Bagley v. Bird | 533 U.S. 973 (2001) | | Scalia, Thomas | |
Rehnquist dissented from the Court's denial of an application to vacate a stay of execution of a death sentence.
| | Brown v. Gilmore | 533 U.S. 1301 (2001) | | | |
Rehnquist denied an application for an injunction.
