= Strate v. A-1 Contractors =

- Supreme Court of the United States

Argued January 7, 1997 Decided April 28, 1997
- Full case name: Strate, Associate Tribal Judge, Tribal Court of the Three Affiliated Tribes of the Fort Berthold Indian Reservation, Et Al. v. A-1 Contractors Et Al.
- Citations: 520 U.S. 438 (more) 117 S. Ct. 1404; 137 L. Ed. 2d 661

Case history
- Prior: A-1 Contractors v. Strate, 76 F.3d 930 (8th Cir. 1996); cert. granted, 518 U.S. 1056 (1996).

Court membership
- Chief Justice William Rehnquist Associate Justices John P. Stevens · Sandra Day O'Connor; Antonin Scalia · Anthony Kennedy; David Souter · Clarence Thomas; Ruth Bader Ginsburg · Stephen Breyer

Case opinion
- Majority: Ginsburg, joined by unanimous

Strate v. A-1 Contractors, 520 U.S. 438 (1997), is a United States Supreme Court case addressing tribal courts' adjudicatory authority over civil matters between nonmembers of the tribe that take place on public highways in Indian Country. Applying Montana v. United States, the court held that, absent Congressional authorization, tribal courts cannot adjudicate civil matters between nonmembers that occur on state-maintained public highways passing over reservation land. Justice Ginsburg delivered the unanimous decision of the court.

== Facts ==
In November 1990, on a strip of state highway passing through the Fort Berthold Indian Reservation, a gravel truck, owned by A-1 Contractors and driven by their employee Lyle Stockert allegedly struck Gisela Frederick's car.

Seriously injured, Fredericks spent 24 days in the hospital. In May 1991, Fredericks filed a personal injury lawsuit in the tribal court for the Three Affiliated Tribes of the Fort Berthold Reservation. She, and her children, who filed a loss of consortium claim, sought over $13 million in damages.

The State of North Dakota maintained the highway and was granted a right-of-way from the United States federal government. Although A-1 Contractors was subcontracting for a tribal-owned corporation at the time of the accident, it was not Indian-owned and its principal place of business was outside the reservation. The driver was not a member of the tribe. Nor was Gisela Fredricks, although her children and her late husband were all tribe members.

== Opinion ==
The court held that the Montana Rule, which governs whether tribes have civil jurisdiction over nonmembers on fee-simple land, also applied to the state-maintained public highway because the terms of the federal right of way grants the State control over traffic. The tribe reserved the right to construct crossings, but did not reserve any rights to "dominion or control" over the right-of-way.

Applying Montana, tribes do not have civil jurisdiction over matters involving non-tribe members and occurring in areas within their reservation where they do not have dominion or control unless (1) the nonmembers "enter consensual relationships with the tribe or its members, through commercial dealing, contracts, leases, or other arrangements" or (2) the nonmember's conduct "threatens or has some direct effect on the political integrity, the economic security, or the health or welfare of the tribe." The court found that neither exception applied.

First, the court found no "consensual relationship" for a car accident. Even though A-1 Contractors was in a consensual relationship with the tribe as a subcontractor for a tribally owned company, Fredericks was not a party to this contract. The court differentiates the accident from prior case law where the "consensual relationship" exception applied, such as Williams v. Lee; These cases typically involve sales taxes or taxes for doing business on the reservation.

Second, although the court recognized that "driv[ing] carelessly on a public highway running through a reservation endanger[s] all in the vicinity, and surely jeopardize[s] the safety of tribal members", this concern is not enough of a threat to the welfare of the tribe to qualify as an exception under Montana. Instead, the court quotes narrowing language from Montana, asserting that "a tribe's inherent power does not reach beyond what is necessary to protect tribal self-government or to control internal relations."

== See also ==
- Oliphant v. Suquamish Indian Tribe
- Montana v. United States
- Atkinson Trading Co. v. Shirley
