= Stewart Baker =

American lawyer (1947–2026)

Stewart Abercrombie Baker
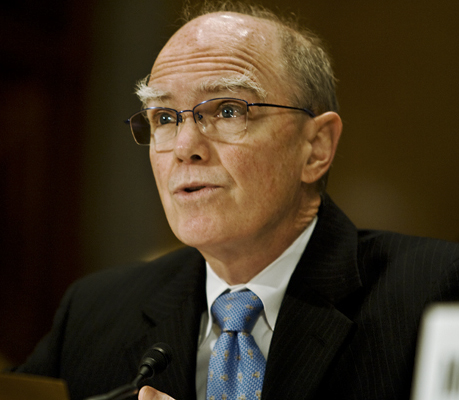

1st Assistant Secretary of Homeland Security for Policy (acting as Under Secretary-equivalent)
- In office July 13, 2005 – January 20, 2009
- Preceded by: position established
- Succeeded by: David Heyman

Personal details
- Born: July 17, 1947 Poughkeepsie, New York, U.S.
- Died: April 30, 2026 (aged 78) Great Falls, Virginia, U.S.
- Spouse: Anne Kornhauser Baker
- Children: 3
- Education: Brown University (B.A.); UCLA School of Law (J.D.)
- Profession: Attorney

Stewart Abercrombie Baker (July 17, 1947 – April 30, 2026) was a lawyer, commentator, and former first Assistant Secretary (acting as Under Secretary-equivalent) for Policy at the United States Department of Homeland Security under the Presidency of George W. Bush.

Baker was the former General Counsel of the National Security Agency (1992–1994) and author of the books The Limits of Trust: Cryptography, Governments, and Electronic Commerce (1998) and Skating on Stilts: Why We Aren't Stopping Tomorrow's Terrorism (2010), and other publications and articles on electronic commerce and international trade. Earlier in his career, Baker was law clerk to John Paul Stevens, Supreme Court from 1977 to 1978. He also clerked for Frank M. Coffin, United States Court of Appeals, First Circuit (1976–1977) and Shirley Hufstedler, US Court of Appeals, Ninth Circuit (1975). He was in private practice with the Washington, DC–based law firm Steptoe & Johnson LLP from 1981 to 1992 and again from 1994 to 2005.

== Early life ==
Baker was born on July 17, 1947, in Poughkeepsie, New York. He is the son of Henry Irving Baker Jr. (1917–1949) and Ruth (Abercrombie) Baker (1918–1965). Baker's father died when he was young, and his mother eventually moved the family to Dearborn, Michigan, supporting them through a career with the Ford Motor Company. Baker attended public high school in Dearborn.

Baker obtained his B.A. degree from Brown University in 1969. He received his J.D. degree from the University of California, Los Angeles (UCLA) School of Law in 1975. While in law school, he published A Strict Scrutiny of the Right to Travel in the UCLA Law Review (1975). He also served as an intern law clerk to Shirley Hufstedler, U.S. Court of Appeals, Ninth Circuit.

== Professional career ==
Following his graduation from law school in 1976, Baker clerked for Frank M. Coffin, United States Court of Appeals, First Circuit. He then clerked for Justice Stevens of the Supreme Court from 1977 to 1978. In 1979, Baker became Deputy General Counsel, Special Assistant to Secretary Shirley Hufstedler, United States Department of Education. He served in this position until 1981. In 1981, Baker joined Steptoe & Johnson LLP.

Baker stayed with Steptoe & Johnson LLP until appointed in 1992 by President George H. W. Bush to serve as General Counsel to the National Security Agency (NSA). Baker served at the NSA during the time when the agency was defending the controversial Clipper Chip, an electronic encryption device that was equipped with a decoding key for use by the US government. Baker was awarded the Defense Medal for Meritorious Civilian Service in 1994.

Following his two-year stint at the National Security Agency, Baker returned to private practice at Steptoe & Johnson. His practice at the firm concentrated on issues related to privacy, national security, computer security, electronic surveillance, encryption, digital commerce, and export controls.

As a Supreme Court advocate, Baker founded the State and Local Legal Center, and later successfully urged that the Court adopt innovative approaches to constitutional federalism (New York v. United States (1992)) and the intersection of trademark and copyright (Dastar v. Twentieth Century Fox (2003)). The Court also took note of Baker's "able representation" after appointing him to defend the decision of the United States Court of Appeals for the Sixth Circuit in Becker v. Montgomery, 532 U.S. 757, 760 n.1 (2001).

After the September 11, 2001 attacks, in 2003, Baker testified before the National Commission on Terrorist Attacks Upon the United States. His testimony noted:

In my view, there were two problems – a problem with the tools our agencies were able to use and a problem with the rules they were required to follow. What's worse, two years later, neither problem has been fixed. Which means that there is a very real risk we will fail again, and that more Americans will die at the hands of terrorists as a result of our failure.

Baker advocated for better use of modern technology for tracking terrorists, including the use of electronic surveillance and better coordination with law enforcement officials. He also noted the importance of recognizing and protecting privacy and civil liberties.

In 2004 to 2005, Baker chaired the drafting team for the report by the General Counsel of the Commission on the Intelligence Capabilities of the United States Regarding Weapons of Mass Destruction. This report examined the intelligence around weapons of mass destruction prior to the invasion of Iraq and made specific recommendations for change to prevent future intelligence errors.

On July 13, 2005, Baker was appointed by President George W. Bush to be Assistant Secretary (acting as Under Secretary-equivalent) for Policy for the United States Department of Homeland Security. His nomination was confirmed by the U.S. Senate on October 7, 2005. News of his nomination was greeted with mixed reviews by privacy advocates and those concerned about his position on civil liberties, and the Department has been unable to elevate his position to an Under Secretary level. He negotiated several agreements between DHS and European governments concerning European privacy law and a U.S. legal requirement that airlines provide reservation data about US-bound passengers to the US government (Passenger name records or PNRs). One of these agreements had a "side letter" that abrogated significant parts of the published agreement.

In 2009, Baker returned to Steptoe where he represented clients until he retired and opened a solo practice in early 2025 (he still holds the record for returning to Steptoe more times than any other lawyer). His 2010 book Skating on Stilts was both a memoir of his work at DHS and his analysis of the tension between privacy and security. From 2013 until his retirement, he also hosted the Cyberlaw Podcast and continued advising on national security and technology issues, writing for several online publications.

In recent years, Baker has testified before Congress on Section 702 of FISA. He also contributed to the intelligence sections of Project 2025.

== Death ==
Baker died on April 30, 2026, at the age of 78 in Great Falls, Virginia.

== See also ==
- List of law clerks for the fourth seat of the Supreme Court of the United States
