= Texas v. Cobb =

- Supreme Court of the United States

Argued January 16, 2001 Decided April 2, 2001
- Full case name: Texas, Petitioner v. Raymond Levi Cobb
- Citations: 532 U.S. 162 (more) 121 S. Ct. 1335; 149 L. Ed. 2d 321
- Argument: Oral argument

Holding
- Because the Sixth Amendment right to counsel is "offense specific," it does not extend to offenses that are "factually related" to those that have actually been charged.

Court membership
- Chief Justice William Rehnquist Associate Justices John P. Stevens · Sandra Day O'Connor; Antonin Scalia · Anthony Kennedy; David Souter · Clarence Thomas; Ruth Bader Ginsburg · Stephen Breyer

Case opinions
- Majority: Rehnquist, joined by O'Connor, Scalia, Kennedy, Thomas
- Concurrence: Kennedy, joined by Scalia, Thomas
- Dissent: Breyer, joined by Stevens, Souter, Ginsburg

Texas v. Cobb, 532 U.S. 162 (2001), was a United States Supreme Court case in which the Court held that the Sixth Amendment right to counsel is offense-specific and does not always extend to offenses that are closely related to those where the right has been attached. This decision reaffirmed the Court's holding in McNeil v. Wisconsin (1991) by concluding that the Sixth Amendment right to counsel attaches at the onset of adversarial proceedings.

== Background ==
In 1994 Raymond Levi Cobb confessed to a home burglary, but denied involvement in the disappearance of a woman and child from the same home. Cobb later retained an attorney to represent him for the burglary charge but didn’t have one for the case involving the woman and child. While Cobb was free on bond in the burglary case, Cobb’s father contacted the police to tell them his son had confessed to killing the woman and child. The police questioned Cobb, who waived his Miranda rights and confessed to both murders. He was subsequently charged with both murders. After his conviction and death sentence, Cobb appealed to the Texas Court of Criminal Appeals on the grounds that his confession had been obtained in violation of his Sixth Amendment right to counsel. Cobb argued the confession should have been suppressed because his right to counsel had been invoked once he had been charged in the burglary case. The Texas Court of Appeal held that Cobb's confession regarding an uncharged murder offense when he was charged with burglary, was inadmissible. The crime in which Cobb was sentenced to death for was the 1993 murders of 22-year-old Margaret Owings and her 16-month-old daughter Kori Rae at their home in Walker County, Texas.

== Opinion of the Court ==
The Texas Court of Criminal Appeals's holding was reversed by the U.S. Supreme Court, which stated that the Sixth Amendment right to counsel is offense-specific, and attaches to charged and sufficiently related uncharged offenses, not necessarily offenses 'factually related' to those that have actually been charged.

== Subsequent developments ==
Critics of the 5–4 decision predicted that the offense-specific rule would endanger suspects’ rights and grant police too much power to carry out interrogations without the presence of counsel. The majority, in response, pointed to suspects’ abilities to invoke their Miranda rights during interrogations –rights which were waived by Cobb. The majority opinion also introduced the Blockburger test — which is used in determining double jeopardy — into Sixth Amendment jurisprudence when using its dictates to determine the distinctiveness of the crimes at issue in the case. Chief Justice William H. Rehnquist, the majority opinion’s author, saw no reason to make a distinction between the meaning of the term “offense” in the Fifth Amendment and the Sixth. Chief Justice Rehnquist further stated that at the time Cobb confessed to the murders, he had been indicted for burglary [charged offense] but had not been charged in the murders. As defined by Texas law, these crimes are not the same offense under Blockburger. Thus, the Sixth Amendment right to counsel did not bar police from interrogating Cobb regarding the murders [uncharged offense], and his confession was therefore admissible. Cobb's death sentence was later commuted to life in prison after the Supreme Court banned the death penalty for juveniles in Roper v. Simmons (2005), as Cobb was 17 at the time of the murder.

== The Minority ==
This differed from the more ambiguous “closely related” test the minority felt was appropriate for Sixth Amendment considerations. The minority predicted the Blockburger test would prove difficult to administer for police — as it has proven to be for judges and lawyers — and would undermine other decisions where the “closely related” test was used.

== See also ==
- Blockburger v. United States, 284 U.S. 299 (1932)
- McNeil v. Wisconsin, 501 U.S. 171 (1991)
