= Implicit divestiture =

Implicit divestiture is the ability of the Supreme Court of the United States to solely determine the extent of an Indian Nation's sovereignty, an approach, of recent decades, to federal Indian policy, which is contradictory to U.S. Constitutional protections of Native American sovereignty.

The issue of indigenous sovereignty rights and their protections under federal trust in the United States was asserted in the 19th century, through Supreme Court cases called the Marshall Trilogy of Johnson v. McIntosh, Cherokee Nation v. Georgia, and Worcester v. Georgia. As Indian law writer Andrew Fletcher terms it, the "colonial trilogy" of Oliphant v. Suquamish Indian Tribe, Montana v. United States, and Nevada v. Hicks undermined tribal sovereignty, through their introduction of "implicit divestiture." Its application in respect to the United Nations Declaration on the Rights of Indigenous Peoples is yet to be tested.
