= Montana v. United States =

- Supreme Court of the United States

Argued December 3, 1980 Decided March 24, 1981
- Full case name: Montana, et al. v. United States, et al.
- Citations: 450 U.S. 544 (more) 101 S. Ct. 1245; 67 L. Ed. 2d 493; 1981 U.S. LEXIS 9; 49 U.S.L.W. 4296

Case history
- Prior: 457 F. Supp. 599 (D. Mont. 1978); reversed, 604 F.2d 1162 (9th Cir. 1979); cert. granted, 445 U.S. 960 (1980).

Holding
- Indian tribes generally do not possess the power to regulate the activities of non-Indians even if those activities occur on Indian lands.

Court membership
- Chief Justice Warren E. Burger Associate Justices William J. Brennan Jr. · Potter Stewart; Byron White · Thurgood Marshall; Harry Blackmun · Lewis F. Powell Jr. William Rehnquist · John P. Stevens

Case opinions
- Majority: Stewart, joined by Burger, White, Powell, Rehnquist, Stevens
- Concurrence: Stevens
- Dissent: Blackmun, joined by Brennan, Marshall

Laws applied
- Crow treaties, 18 U.S.C. § 1165

Montana v. United States, 450 U.S. 544 (1981), was a Supreme Court case that addressed two issues: (1) Whether the title of the Big Horn Riverbed rested with the United States, in trust for the Crow Tribe or passed to the State of Montana upon becoming a state and (2) Whether Crow Tribe retained the power to regulate hunting and fishing on tribal lands owned in fee-simple by a non-tribal member. First, the Court held that Montana held title to the Big Horn Riverbed because the Equal Footing Doctrine required the United States to pass title to the newly incorporated State. Second, the Court held that Crow Tribe lacked the power to regulate nonmember hunting and fishing on fee-simple land owned by nonmembers, but within the bounds of its reservation. More broadly, the Court held that Tribes could not exercise regulatory authority over nonmembers on fee-simple land within the reservation unless (1) the nonmember entered a "consensual relationship" with the Tribe or its members or (2) the nonmember's "conduct threatens or has some direct effect on the political integrity, the economic security, or the health or welfare of the tribe."

The Supreme Court in Montana v. United States set a precedent which resulted in a wave of litigation challenging not only the exercise of tribal court authority over non-members, but the very existence of that authority.

== Background ==
In October 1973, the Crow Tribal Council enacted Resolution Tribal Edict No. 74-05, to restrict fishing in response to increasing food prices and tribal enrollment, coupled with decreasing supplies of fish and game on the reservation. In May 1974, James Junior Finch, a non-tribal member, went fishing, in open defiance of the tribal resolution. Charges were filed against Finch in district court. In September, District Court Judge James F. Battin ruled (for the moment) that the Bighorn riverbed was held in trust by the United States for the tribe. This ruling was consistent with one he made three years earlier, declaring in 1971 that, since the U.S. did not expressly withhold the riverbed in any of the Fort Laramie treaties, it gave the tribes "absolute right of use over the area described." In that ruling Battin made note that the Crow reservation was superimposed on traditional Crow territory.

In April 1975, Battin overruled the decision he made 8 months earlier, deciding that the riverbed in question was owned by the state. He asserted that the tribe did not have the "exclusive right to fish" since the first Fort Laramie Treaty in 1851 only referred to fishing as a "mere privilege" and the 1868 Fort Laramie Treaty "does not contain any reference to fishing." Battin further concluded that the tribe lacked sufficient sovereignty to regulate non-members from fishing and hunting on the reservation. "The blunt fact…is that an Indian tribe is sovereign to the extent the United States permits it to be -- neither more nor less."

Days after this decision, the tribe approved a special ordinance and resolution in response to Battin's ruling and reasserted their authority to regulate non-members' sporting activities on tribal land, empowering tribal game wardens and police to arrest non-members going on the reservation to boat, fish, trap, or hunt. They also appealed Battin's decision to the Ninth Circuit Court of Appeals. Chairman Patrick Stands Over Bull, Thomas Lynaugh (attorney), and eighteen other delegates went to D.C. to "argue their case" to the government. The tribe felt that Battin's ruling undermined their sovereignty as well as threatened future coal production and water rights.

In December 1976, the Ninth Circuit Court of Appeals reversed Judge Battin's decision. Judge Anthony Kennedy held that the riverbed fell within the boundaries of the reservation and was therefore owned by the U.S. and the Crow Tribe. Kennedy also made reference to the Fort Laramie treaties, stating that the establishment of the reservation was to provide a permanent homeland for the people and that they had every right to the resources contained within it. Kennedy applied traditional canons of Indian law by stating that the negotiations of the two treaties had no other meaning to the natives other than the fact that the "government recognized all lands within the metes and bounds of the reservation were theirs."

In July 1978, on remand, Battin once again ruled in favor of the state, concluding that the U.S. did not reserve the river bed for the tribe, that the "Crow tribe was not indigenous historically to either Montana or Wyoming," that they were a nomadic people with origins in Canada. Despite testimony from Joe Medicine Crow and Henry Old Coyote supporting the fact that Crows routinely fished and often supplemented their diet with fish, Battin concluded that "fishing was not central to the Crow diet." Battin then addressed the issue of whether or not the State has power to regulate hunting and fishing by non-members within reservation limits. Again, Battin ruled in favor of the state, holding that Montana did have authority to regulate non-members on the river and on all non-Indian fee land within the reservation. Battin also concluded that the state had "concurrent jurisdiction" with the U.S. to regulate these activities on tribal land if the activities violated state law. Battin addressed tribal rights by stating that, while they retain the right to give permission to non-members to hunt and fish on tribal lands, tribes do not have the power to regulate non-members unless specifically granted by an "act of Congress," referring to Oliphant v. Suquamish.

In June 1979, the Ninth Circuit Court of Appeals unanimously overturned Battin's ruling, holding that the river (bed and banks) was held by the United States in trust for the Crow tribe. Addressing the emergent regulatory issues, they ruled that the tribal resolution 74-05 was invalid only when it came to "resident non-members" on fee land that they personally owned, and that the resolution was valid when it came to regulating "non-resident non-member owners of land and resident non-members on any other territory" within the reservation. The tribe could regulate both members and non-members as long as the non-members were not subjected to criminal sanctions and the process was carried out in a non-discriminatory fashion, consistent with conservation principles. Both parties were dissatisfied with the decision and both petitioned for a rehearing, but both of these petitions were denied.

In April 1980, the U.S. Supreme Court granted the state of Montana's petition for certiorari. In the ensuing briefings, Montana's attorneys argued that lands under navigable waters on federal land were supposed to be held in trust by the U.S. for the State. States are considered to have "equal footing" in this regard. They argued that the tribe held no authority to regulate non-members on non-Indian lands within the reservation and that the "allotment legislation" voided any treaty-based authority given to the tribe. They supported these claims with the Oliphant case, which denied tribes inherent sovereign authority to exercise criminal jurisdiction over non-Indians.

The U.S. and Crow attorneys contended that the U.S. appropriated the land in question prior to statehood for the benefit of the Crow tribe and that the tribe did not expressly cede the rights in question in any treaty. They urged that the Allotment acts did not in any way change or "dilute" treaty rights.

== Opinion of the Court ==
Seal of the Supreme Court of the United States

In this case, the Supreme Court ruled on two issues: (1) Who held title of the Big Horn Riverbed and (2) Whether Tribes retained regulatory authority over hunting and fishing on reservation land owned in fee-simple by non-Indians.

First, the Court resolved whether title of the Big Horn Riverbed remained with the United States, held in trust for the Crow Tribe, or was transferred to the State of Montana when it was admitted to the Union. The Court found the title belonged to Montana. Since the federal government, "[a]s a general principle," transfers title for navigable waterways to States upon incorporation, the equal footing doctrine requires that Montana retain the same right to title for navigable waters within the geographic boundaries as other states. While the Second Treaty of Fort Laramie conveyed land to the Crow Tribe, setting it "apart for the absolute and undisturbed use and occupation of the Indians," it did not explicitly refer to the riverbed. Therefore, the Treaty language cannot overcome the presumption that title passed to the State of Montana.

Second, analogizing to Oliphant's holding in the context of criminal jurisdiction, the Court held that Tribes do not have inherent sovereign power to exercise civil jurisdiction over activities occurring on fee-simple reservation land owned by nonmembers unless (1) the nonmembers have entered "consensual relationships with the tribe or its members, through commercial dealing, contracts, leases, or other arrangements" or (2) the nonmember's "conduct threatens or has some direct effect on the political integrity, the economic security, or the health or welfare of the tribe." The Court found that nonmember hunters and fishers on fee-simple land neither entered consensual relationships with the tribe nor threatened the political or economic integrity of the Tribe. Therefore, the Tribe could not regulate nonmember hunting and fishing practices on fee-simple land within the reservation.

== Dissent ==
Harry Blackmun's dissenting opinion, with William Brennan and Thurgood Marshall joining, addresses the issue of the canons of construction regarding treaties.

Only two years ago, this Court reaffirmed that the terms of a treaty between the United States and an Indian tribe must be construed "in the sense in which they would naturally be understood by the Indians." As in any case involving the construction of a treaty, it is necessary at the outset to determine what the parties intended. ...With respect to an Indian treaty, the Court has said that "the United States, as the party with the presumptively superior negotiating skills and superior knowledge of the language in which the treaty is recorded, has a responsibility to avoid taking advantage of the other side." ...In holding today that the bed of the Bighorn River passed to the State of Montana upon its admission to the Union, the Court disregards this settled rule of statutory construction. Because I believe that the United States intended, and the Crow Tribe understood, that the bed of the Big Horn was to belong to the Crow Indians, I dissent from so much of the Court's opinion as hold otherwise. As in any case involving the construction of a treaty, it is necessary at the outset to determine what the parties intended. ...the Crow were assured in 1867 that they would receive "a tract of your country as a home for yourselves and children forever, upon which your great Father [the US President] will not permit the white man to trespass."

Rebutting the 'equal footing' argument, the dissent in part II states:

...it defies common sense to suggest that the Crow Indians would have so understood the terms of the Fort Laramie Treaties. In negotiating the 1851 treaty, the United States repeatedly referred to the territories at issue as 'your country,' as 'your land,' and as 'your territory.' ...It is hardly credible that the Crow Indians who heard this declaration would have understood that the United States meant to retain the ownership of the riverbed that ran through the very heart of the land the United States promised to set aside for the Indians and their children 'forever.' Indeed, Chief Blackfoot, when addressed by Commissioner Taylor, responded: 'The Crows used to own all this Country including all the rivers of the West.' Id., at 88. (Emphasis added.) The conclusion is inescapable that the Crow Indians understood that they retained the ownership of at least those rivers within the metes and bounds of the reservation [450 U.S. 544, 579] granted them. This understanding could only have been strengthened by the reference in the 1868 treaty to the mid-channel of the Yellowstone River as part of the boundary of the reservation; the most likely interpretation that the Crow could have placed on that reference is that half the Yellowstone belonged to them, and it is likely that they accordingly deduced that all of the rivers within the boundary of the reservation belonged to them.

In fact, any other conclusion would lead to absurd results.

The dissent thus stands firmly against the majority's "silent nullification" of the treaties in its "equal footing" argument that there was a "strong presumption" that the federal government held lands under navigable waters in trust for the states rather than the tribes.

== Effects ==
Montana State Flag

Montana v. United States is a critical case because, in part, it left behind a "cauldron of confusion" regarding jurisdiction. The opinion states that tribes "inherent sovereign power to exercise some forms of civil jurisdiction over non-Indians on their reservations, even on non-Indian fee lands. A tribe may regulate, through taxation, licensing, or other means, the activities of nonmembers who enter consensual relationships with the tribe or its members, through commercial dealing, contracts, leases, or other arrangements." In addition, tribes retain "inherent power to exercise civil authority over the conduct of non-Indians on fee lands within its reservation when that conduct threatens or has some direct effect on the political integrity, the economic security, or the health or welfare of the tribe."

Since the court decision in 1981, it has been used many times as an important precedent. Shortly after the Montana decision was made, the Court used it in both National Farmers Union Ins. Co. v. Crow Tribe (1985) and Iowa Mutual Ins. Co. v. LaPlante (1987). Both cases were related to tribal power, and the Court relied on Montana to rule that "tribal inherent powers do not extend beyond what is necessary to protect tribal self-government or to control internal relations." These decisions dictate that a nonmember of the tribe can enter "federal court to challenge tribal court jurisdiction over them, usually after they've first 'exhausted' tribal court remedies." The Montana decision was used again in the Atkinson Trading Company v. Shirley (2001) to strike down a tax imposed on non-tribal members for operating a hotel on lands owned by the Navajo Reservation. The ruling has created problems for the courts since it was made. In the 1997 court case Strate v. A-1 Contractors, the Montana ruling was used to determine that tribal courts did not have the authority to listen to a case that involved an accident involving two non-tribal members on the reservation. The Montana case outlined the principles on tribal sovereignty, especially over issues relating to non-tribal members. The ruling made in the Montana-Strate-Atkinson is derived from the Oliphant ruling, and shows the inherent tribal civil jurisdictional powers.

The Montana ruling continues to be applied. In 2005 an on-duty police officer died in a single car accident when the officer's Ford Expedition rolled over on a tribally maintained road. It was a single car accident, and the car allegedly rolled over due to a product defect. The Ford Motor Company entered federal court looking to challenge the issue of tribal jurisdiction in this case. The Montana ruling was applied, and neither of its two exceptions were found to apply, because there were no consensual relations between the tribe and the Ford Motor Company, and the security of the nation was not at stake. This is just one example of how the Montana ruling is still being applied in 21st century court cases.

=== Legacy ===
Montana has been cited hundreds of times in the lower courts with mixed outcomes. An important part of Montana is the ability of the tribes to regulate all activity related to tribal interests under the first "direct effects" exception. To the chagrin of the State of Montana, the "direct effects" exception was used by the Ninth Circuit to uphold the substantive authority of the Confederated Salish and Kootenai Tribes to set water standards on the reservation that had the effect of imposing obligations on non-Indians living off the reservation upstream. Another vital part of the Montana ruling is the ability of tribes to regulate consensual activity under the second exception. This exception permitted the tribal courts of the Mississippi Band of Choctaw Indians to hear a case in which a non-Indian employee of a Dollar General retail store was accused of committing a tort against a teenage tribal member. These two exceptions have been addressed many times by the courts since the ruling was made in 1981.

== See also ==
- Nevada v. Hicks, 533 U.S. 353 (2001)
- Atkinson Trading Co. v. Shirley, 532 U.S. 645 (2001)
- Strate v. A-1 Contractors, 520 U.S. 438 (1997)
- Dollar General Corp. v. Mississippi Band of Choctaw Indians, 579 U.S. ___ (2016)
- List of United States Supreme Court cases, volume 450
