= Attachment (law) =

Attachment is a legal process by which a court of law, at the request of a creditor, designates specific property owned by the debtor to be transferred to the creditor, or sold for the benefit of the creditor. A wide variety of legal mechanisms are employed by debtors to prevent the attachment of their assets.

== Prejudgment attachment ==
Prejudgment attachment or Prejudgment writ of attachment allows recovery of money damages by levying a security interest on the property of the party paying money damages. A writ of attachment is filed to secure debt or claim of the creditor in the event that a judgment is rendered.

Foreign attachment procedures have existed from time to time in Scotland, where it was known as arrestment; in France, where it was known as saisie arret; in the U.S and elsewhere.

Prejudgment attachment in Chinese litigation proceeding can be obtained by the plaintiff before filing the case with court or arbitration commission in the case of emergency where failure to take immediate action will result in irreparable damage to relevant party. However, the party shall file its case with court or arbitration body within thirty days after the prejudgment attachment is granted by courts.

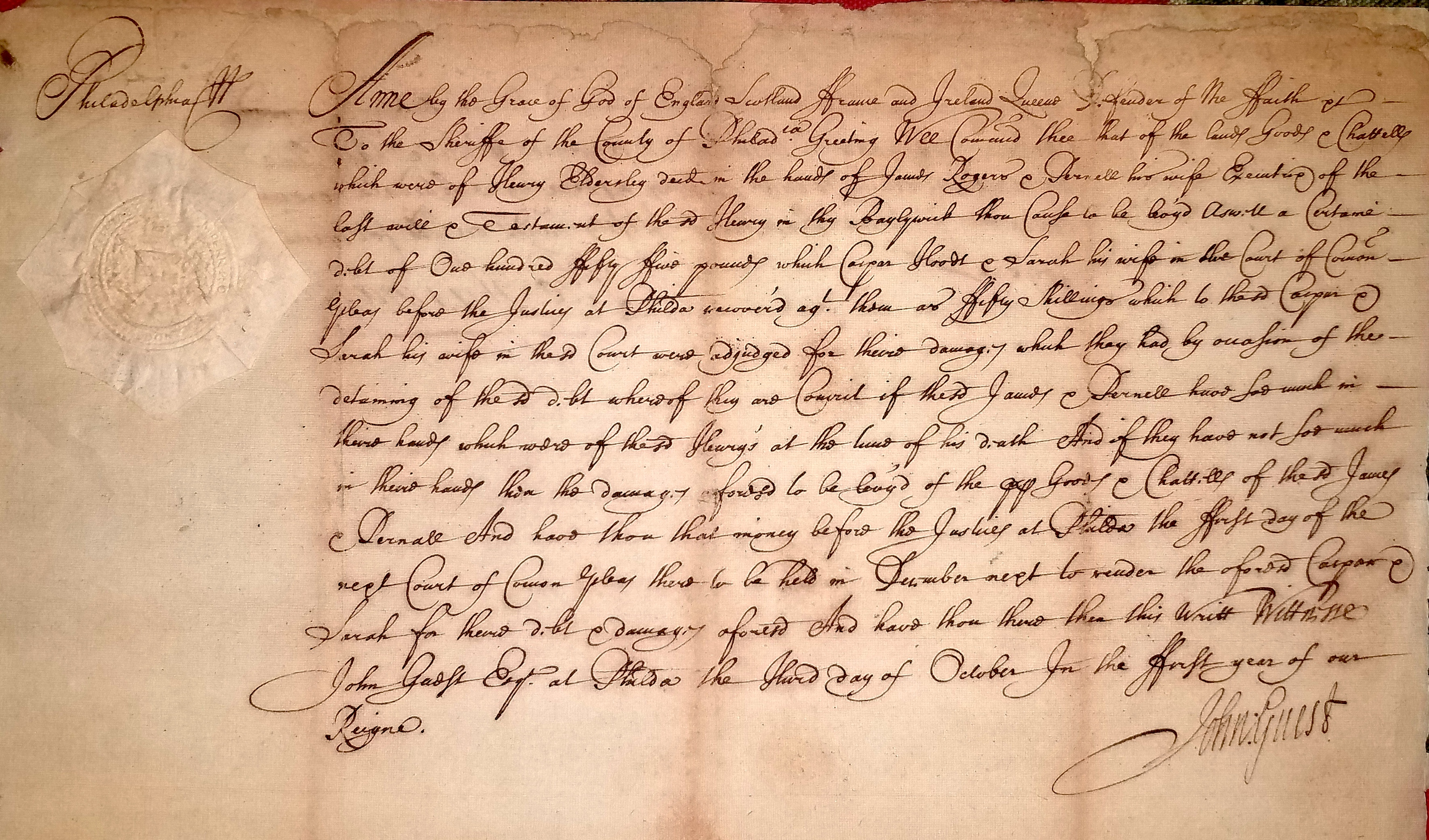
1702 Post-Judgment Writ of Attachment signed by Chief Justice John Guest of the Province of Pennsylvania

=== Historical London procedure ===
The person holding the property or owing the money had to be within the City at the time of being served with the process, but all persons were entitled to the benefit of the custom. The plaintiff having started the action, and made a satisfactory affidavit of his debt, was entitled to issue attachment, which thereupon affected all the money or property of the defendant in the hands of the third party, the garnishee. The garnishee had all the defences which would be available to him against the defendant, his alleged creditor. If there had been no fraud or collusion, the garnishee could plead payment under the attachment. The court to which this process belonged was the Lord Mayor's Court, the procedure of which was regulated by the Mayor's Court of London Procedure Act 1857. This custom, and all proceedings relating to it, were expressly exempted from the operation of the Debtor's Act 1869.

== Attachment of earnings ==
Attachment of earnings, also known as garnishment, is a process whereby the creditor attaches money owed to the debtor by the debtor's employer.

== See also ==
- Sequestration (law)
- Distraint
- Connecticut v. Doehr
