= Connecticut v. Doehr =

- Supreme Court of the United States

Argued January 7, 1991 Decided June 6, 1991
- Full case name: Connecticut v. Brian K. Doehr
- Citations: 501 U.S. 1 (more) 111 S. Ct. 2105; 115 L. Ed. 2d 1; 1991 U.S. LEXIS 3317

Case history
- Prior: Certiorari to the United States Court of Appeals for the Second Circuit

Holding
- A state law authorizing the prejudgment attachment of a defendant's real property at the outset of a lawsuit without notice to the defendant or a hearing or any showing of extraordinary circumstances violates the Due Process Clause of the Fourteenth Amendment.

Court membership
- Chief Justice William Rehnquist Associate Justices Byron White · Thurgood Marshall; Harry Blackmun · John P. Stevens; Sandra Day O'Connor · Antonin Scalia; Anthony Kennedy · David Souter

Case opinions
- Majority: White, joined by unanimous (Parts I, III); Rehnquist, Marshall, Blackmun, Stevens, O'Connor, Kennedy, Souter (Part II)
- Plurality: White, joined by Marshall, Stevens, O'Connor (Parts IV, V)
- Concurrence: Rehnquist, joined by Blackmun
- Concurrence: Scalia

Laws applied
- U.S. Const. amend. XIV

Connecticut v. Doehr, 501 U.S. 1 (1991), was a United States Supreme Court case in which the Court held that a state statute authorizing prejudgment attachment of a defendant's real property upon the filing of an action without prior notice or hearing, a showing of extraordinary circumstances, or a requirement that the plaintiff post a bond violates the Due Process Clause of the Fourteenth Amendment.

== Background ==
A Connecticut statute, Conn. Gen. Stat. § 52-278e(a)(1), provided that when a civil lawsuit was commenced, the plaintiff could ask a judge to attach any real property that the defendant owned, for the purpose of ensuring that the plaintiff would be able to collect any judgment that eventually resulted from the suit. The attachment impaired the defendant's ownership rights in the property, such as by clouding title to the property and making it impossible to sell or mortgage the property.

Under the Connecticut procedure, attachments were based solely on the plaintiff's submitting a "verification" (equivalent to an affidavit) asserting of probable cause to sustain the validity of his or her claim. There was no requirement that prior notice of the attachment be provided to the defendant, any hearing be held before the property was attached, the property have anything to do with the subject-matter of the lawsuit, or that any unusual or extraordinary circumstances be shown.

In 1988, John F. DiGiovanni sued Brian K. Doehr for $75,000 for assault and battery in Connecticut Superior Court. DiGiovanni moved for Doehr's real property to be attached, submitting a five-sentence affidavit opining that there was a good basis for his claim. The judge ordered the attachment. Doehr received no notice of the proceedings until after the sheriff had levied the attachment. The notice advised Doehr that he could request a post-attachment hearing if he wished.

Doehr filed a federal complaint in the United States District Court for the District of Connecticut, contending that the Connecticut pre-judgment attachment procedure violated his constitutional right to due process. The District Court upheld the statute, but the United States Court of Appeals for the Second Circuit reversed, concluding that the statute was unconstitutional because it authorized ex parte attachments without a showing of extraordinary circumstances and without a hearing.

The State of Connecticut and DiGiovanni sought review in the United States Supreme Court, which granted certiorari.

== Opinion of the Court ==
Justice White delivered the opinion of the Court. The Court was unanimous as to the result of the case and Parts I and III of the opinion but not the entire opinion.

The Court concluded that the constitutionality of the Connecticut prejudgment attachment procedure must be judged by the balancing test for due process claims described in Mathews v. Eldridge (1976). The Court concluded that the Connecticut law created too great a risk of erroneous deprivation of property to survive scrutiny under Mathews. In reaching that conclusion, the Court emphasized, among other things, that no notice of the proposed attachment was given to the defendant before it was levied, no pre-attachment hearing was provided even though the plaintiff's perfunctory verification may provide the judge with little or no insight into the validity of the plaintiff's claim, there was no requirement that the subject-matter of the claim be related to the real property being attached, and there was no requirement that the plaintiff show special circumstances such as that the defendant was seeking to evade payment of any judgment that might be awarded. The Court also observed that while an attachment of defendant's real property did not deprive them of the use of the property, it nonetheless represented a significant interference with the defendant's ownership rights.

In Parts IV and V of his opinion, which spoke only for a plurality of the Court, Justice White asserted that due process also required that a plaintiff obtaining an attachment must post a bond or other security for the damages the defendant might suffer in the event the attachment and underlying lawsuit proved to be unjustified.

=== Rehnquist's concurrence ===
Chief Justice Rehnquist filed a concurring opinion, joined by Justice Blackmun. Chief Justice Rehnquist agreed that the Connecticut attachment statute failed to satisfy due process but objected to what he described as the majority opinion's "lengthy disquisition as to what combination of safeguards are required to satisfy Due Process in hypothetical cases not before the Court."

=== Scalia's concurrence ===
Justice Scalia filed a one-paragraph opinion concurring in part and concurring in the judgment. The only Justice who declined to join Part II of Justice White's opinion, he opined that because the Connecticut pre-judgment attachment procedure was "unknown at common law," it must be evaluated in light of the balancing test for due process that the Court set forth in Mathews v. Eldridge and agreed that it failed that test.

== See also ==
- List of United States Supreme Court cases, volume 501
