= Jean v. Massachusetts State Police =

- Court: United States District Court for the District of Massachusetts
- Full case name: Jean v. Massachusetts State Police, et al.
- Decided: June 22, 2007
- Citations: 4:06CV40031 (District); No. 06-1775 (Appeals)

Court membership
- Judge sitting: F. Dennis Saylor IV

Jean v. Massachusetts State Police, 492 F.3d 24 (1st Cir. 2007) is a case concerning the legality of posting a video on the internet obtained by another source through illegal means, which in this case involve use of a nanny cam to record others. The plaintiff filed for a permanent injunction against the defendants, who issued a cease-and-desist order regarding a video posted on the plaintiff's website. The defendants claimed the video was in violation of Massachusetts law M.G.L c 272 § 99, which defines the secret recording of audio without the consent of the persons recorded as interception, and subject to prosecution as a felony due to the presence of audio in the videorecording. The court's decision drew heavily off of previous court case Bartnicki v. Vopper. The court's decision held that it was legal to post such a video which was lawfully obtained from another, especially regarding a matter of public concern.

== Background ==
Mary Jean, a local political activist in Worcester, Massachusetts, maintained a website displaying articles and other information critical of former Worcester County District Attorney John Conte. (The site, Conte2006.com, is no longer in operation.) In October 2005, Paul Pechonis contacted Jean, who he had not previously met. Pechonis explained that on September 29, 2005, he was arrested at his home for a misdemeanor, after which the police proceeded to conduct a warrantless search of his home. The search was captured on Pechonis' child security system, or "nanny cam." It was not resolved whether the recording was intentional or accidental. He offered the recording to Jean, who posted it to her website on January 29, including an editorial comment critical of Conte's performance in office. During the court proceedings, it was assumed that when Jean accepted the tape, she had reason to know that it had been illegally recorded.

== Procedural history ==
News of the footage spread, and on February 14, the Massachusetts State Police sent a cease-and-desist letter demanding that Jean remove the video within 48 hours or face criminal action. The letter cited Massachusetts law M.G.L c 272 § 99, stating that "this secret, unauthorized audio/video recording is in violation [...] and subject to prosecution as a felony." This law defines interception as, "to secretly hear, secretly record, or aid another to secretly hear or secretly record the contents of any wire or oral communication through the use of any intercepting device by any person other than a person given prior authority by all parties to such communication." The police sent a second letter on March 29, which clarified the previous letter by stating that, given the statute's limitation to "wire or oral communications," Jean would not be in violation if she removed the audio portion of the recording from her website.

In response, Jean filed a lawsuit in federal court requesting an injunction to prevent the Massachusetts police from pursuing legal action. Jean sought both an immediate temporary restraining order and a permanent injunction that would prevent the police from taking any action against her related to the video. Citing her rights to free speech under the First Amendment, Jean sought to preclude defendants from threatening her with prosecution or enforcing section 99 against her. The order did state, however, that it did not authorize State Police from undertaking ordinary and lawful law enforcement investigatory and enforcement activities, including any such activities that are targeted at Paul Pechonis or Mary T. Jean. The court granted the restraining order on the day the complaint was filed, which prevented the police from interfering with Jean's disclosure, use, or display, including posting on the internet, of the audio/video recording.

== Ruling of the District Court ==
The District Court ultimately granted the permanent injunction. The court assumed for the sake of argument that Jean had reason to know that the recording might have been illegal when she posted it. Finding a public interest in Jean's publication of the information contained in the video, the court decided that the police's duty to restrain illegal recording could not counterbalance Jean's free speech rights. Key to this decision was that Jean did not record the event herself; thus, punishing her would not serve the same deterrence goals as would punishing the recorder.

== Appeals ==
The United States Court of Appeals for the First Circuit upheld the injunction, echoing the lower court's comments regarding the balancing of free speech versus the police's law-enforcing goals. It was noted that Jean herself played no part in the recording of the video, that she had obtained the tape lawfully, and that the videotape related to a matter of public concern.

The court concluded that government interests in preserving privacy and deterring illegal interceptions were less compelling in this case than in Bartnicki v. Vopper, and Jean's circumstances were otherwise materially indistinguishable from those of the defendants in Bartnicki, whose publication of an illegally intercepted tape was protected by the First Amendment. Jean's publication of the recording on her website was thus entitled to the same First Amendment protection. Consequently, they agreed with the district court that Jean had a reasonable likelihood of success on the merits of her suit for a permanent injunction.

== Cases cited in court proceedings ==
- Bartnicki v. Vopper, 532 U.S. 514 (2001)
- Wine & Spirits Retailers, Inc. v. Rhode Island, 418 F.3rd 36, 46 (1st Cir. 2005)
- Bl(a)ck Tea Soc'y v. City of Boston, 378 F.3d 8, 11 (1st Cir. 2004)
- Floyd Abrams and Smith v. Daily Mail Publishing Co., 443 U.S. 97, 103 (1979)
- Boehner v. McDermott, 191 F.3d 463, 484-85 (D.C. Cir. 1999)
- Boehner v. McDermott, 2007 WL 1246438 (D.C. Cir. May 1, 2007)(en banc)
