= Gentile v. State Bar of Nevada =

- Supreme Court of the United States

Decided June 27, 1991
- Full case name: Gentile v. State Bar of Nevada
- Citations: 501 U.S. 1030 (more)

Holding
- A "substantial likelihood of material prejudice" test for a restriction of lawyer speech about an ongoing proceeding satisfies the First Amendment, but the test must not be void for vagueness.

Court membership
- Chief Justice William Rehnquist Associate Justices Byron White · Thurgood Marshall; Harry Blackmun · John P. Stevens; Sandra Day O'Connor · Antonin Scalia; Anthony Kennedy · David Souter

Case opinions
- Majority: Kennedy (Part III and IV), joined by MARSHALL, BLACKMUN, STEVENS, O'CONNOR
- Majority: Rehnquist (Part I and II), joined by WHITE, O'CONNOR, SCALIA, SOUTER
- Plurality: Kennedy (remainder), joined by MARSHALL, BLACKMUN, STEVENS
- Concurrence: O'Connor
- Dissent: Rehnquist (remainder), joined by WHITE, SCALIA, SOUTER

Gentile v. State Bar of Nevada, 501 U.S. 1030 (1991), was a United States Supreme Court case in which the court held that a "substantial likelihood of material prejudice" test for a restriction of lawyer speech about an ongoing proceeding satisfies the First Amendment, but the test must not be void for vagueness.

== Background ==
Gentile, an attorney, held a press conference the day after his client, Sanders, was indicted on criminal charges under Nevada law. Six months later, a jury acquitted Sanders. Subsequently, the State Bar of Nevada filed a complaint against Gentile, alleging that statements he made during the press conference violated Nevada Supreme Court Rule 177, which prohibits a lawyer from making extrajudicial statements to the press that he knows or reasonably should know will have a "substantial likelihood of materially prejudicing" an adjudicative proceeding, 177(1), which lists a number of statements that are "ordinarily... likely" to result in material prejudice, 177(2), and which provides that a lawyer "may state without elaboration... the general nature of the... defense" "[n]otwithstanding subsection 1 and 2 (a-f)," 177(3). The Disciplinary Board found that Gentile violated the Rule and recommended that he be privately reprimanded. The Nevada Supreme Court affirmed, rejecting his contention that the Rule violated his right to free speech.

== Opinion of the court ==
The Supreme Court issued an opinion on June 27, 1991. There were two majority opinions representing different coalitions of five justices. Kennedy's majority concluded that, as interpreted by the Nevada Supreme Court, Rule 177 was void for vagueness. Thus, the court overturned Gentile's reprimand. Rehnquist's majority concluded that the "substantial likelihood of material prejudice" test applied by Nevada and most other States satisfies the First Amendment.

== See also ==
- American Bar Association Model Rule of Professional Conduct 3.6, the trial publicity rule implemented in many jurisdictions.
