= Toibb v. Radloff =

- Supreme Court of the United States

Argued April 22, 1991 Decided June 13, 1991
- Full case name: Sheldon Baruch Toibb v. Stuart J. Radloff
- Citations: 501 U.S. 157 (more) 111 S. Ct. 2197; 115 L. Ed. 2d 145; 1991 U.S. LEXIS 3484

Case history
- Prior: In re Toibb, 902 F.2d 14 (8th Cir. 1990); cert. granted, 498 U.S. 1060 (1991).

Holding
- An individual may petition for reorganization under chapter 11 of the United States Bankruptcy Code, even if not engaged in a business.

Court membership
- Chief Justice William Rehnquist Associate Justices Byron White · Thurgood Marshall; Harry Blackmun · John P. Stevens; Sandra Day O'Connor · Antonin Scalia; Anthony Kennedy · David Souter

Case opinions
- Majority: Blackmun, joined by Rehnquist, White, Marshall, O'Connor, Scalia, Kennedy, Souter
- Dissent: Stevens

Laws applied
- 11 U.S.C. § 109(b), (d)

Toibb v. Radloff, 501 U.S. 157 (1991), was a case in which the United States Supreme Court held that individuals are eligible to file for relief under the reorganization provisions of chapter 11 of the United States Bankruptcy Code, even if they are not engaged in a business. The case overturned the lower courts ruling which restricted individuals to chapter 7.

== Background ==
In the United States, an individual or entity may file for bankruptcy to obtain relief from debts. An individual who files for bankruptcy, known as the "debtor," may be allowed to pay as much of his or her debts as possible, under the supervision of a federal bankruptcy court. Any remaining debt is discharged, thus allowing the debtor a financial "fresh start."

Bankruptcy cases are governed by the Bankruptcy Code, which in its current form was enacted as title 11 of the United States Code in 1978. pursuant to the Bankruptcy Clause of Article I, Section 8 of the Constitution.

The Bankruptcy Code provides for several different types of bankruptcy case, each of which is addressed in a separate "chapter" of the Code. The most common type of bankruptcy is liquidation under chapter 7 of the Code, which applies to both individual and corporate debtors. In a chapter 7 case, an individual debtor's non-exempt assets are placed into a bankruptcy estate under the control of a court-appointed trustee for distribution to creditors, and the debtor usually receives a discharge of his or her remaining debts. Alternatively, an individual who earns regular income and whose income is less than a specified annual maximum may instead choose to file a chapter 13 case, under which the individual agrees to repay all or a portion of his or her debts under a repayment plan approved by the bankruptcy court. (There is also an additional option, chapter 12, available for debtors who are farmers or fishermen.)

Another type of bankruptcy case is reorganization under chapter 11 of the Bankruptcy Code. In a chapter 11 case, unless the court orders otherwise, the debtor retains operating control of their assets as a "debtor in possession" and is allowed a period of time within which to propose a "plan of reorganization" to address creditor claims. The procedures for chapter 11 reorganization cases are complex and were widely understood to apply only to business debtors—that is, business entities such as corporations, and individuals who were the owners of a business enterprise. However, the Code did not expressly state that chapter 11 excluded individuals who were not engaged in business from filing a chapter 11 case.

== Facts and procedural history ==
Sheldon Toibb, an individual in financial distress, filed a chapter 7 bankruptcy petition in Missouri. Among his assets, Toibb listed stock in a corporation. The stock later turned out to be worth more than Toibb had expected. Toibb filed a motion to convert his bankruptcy case from a chapter 7 liquidation to a chapter 11 reorganization, to avoid the liquidation of the stock.

The bankruptcy court initially granted the motion, but later ordered Toibb "to show cause why his petition should not be dismissed because petitioner was not engaged in business and, therefore, did not qualify as a chapter 11 debtor." Toibb argued that he was engaged in a business, or in the alternative, that individuals who do not own businesses are also eligible for relief under Chapter 11. The bankruptcy court rejected these arguments based on Eighth Circuit precedent and held that Toibb "failed to qualify for relief under Chapter 11."

Toibb appealed to the United States District Court for the Eastern District of Missouri, which affirmed the decision of the bankruptcy judge. On further appeal, the Eighth Circuit also affirmed.

Toibb petitioned the Supreme Court for a writ of certiorari to review the Eighth Circuit's decision, based on conflicting decisions between the Eighth Circuit, which had held that only businesses and business owners may file for chapter 11, and the United States Court of Appeals for the Eleventh Circuit, which had held that individuals can file under chapter 11 even if they do not own a business.

== Opinion of the Court ==
Justice Harry A. Blackmun wrote the opinion of the Court, speaking for eight Justices. The Court held that nothing in the Bankruptcy Code prevents an individual debtor from filing for Chapter 11 bankruptcy, even if he or she is not engaged in a business.

The Court's opinion stated that in interpreting a statute, courts "look first to the statutory language and then to the legislative history if the statutory language is unclear." Here, the relevant statute was Section 109 of the Bankruptcy Code, which defines who may be a debtor under the different chapters or types of bankruptcy case. Section 109(d) provides that "[o]nly a person that may be a debtor under chapter 7 of this title, except a stockbroker or a commodity broker, and a railroad may be a debtor under chapter 11 of this title." In turn, Section 109(b) provides that "[a] person may be a debtor under chapter 7 of this title" as long as the person is not a railroad, insurance company, or bank or similar financial institution. Nothing in the text of the Code requires that only businesses or individuals engaged in a business can file for chapter 11 reorganization. Given the great care with which Congress enumerated those who can and cannot receive protection under each chapter, the Court was "loath to infer the exclusion of certain classes of debtors from the protections of Chapter 11."

Turning to the legislative history of the then-current version of the Bankruptcy Code, the Court acknowledged that a Senate report showed that Congress anticipated that businesses would be the most common parties to file under chapter 11. However, this did not show that only businesses could permissibly file under chapter 11. Likewise, the Court considered the ultimate purposes of the various chapters of the Code, one of which is "maximizing the value of the bankruptcy estate"; because a chapter 11 reorganization plan must be approved by creditors or must provide that creditors "will receive not less than they would receive under a Chapter 7 liquidation," denying chapter 11 protection to individuals would not advance Congress' overall purpose.

Finally, the Court considered the possibility that if chapter 11 were held to apply to individuals, an individual could be subjected to an involuntary chapter 11 case leading to "debt peonage," a form of involuntary servitude). (Although chapter 13 bankruptcy petitions are always voluntary, a chapter 11 case can be commenced by creditors.) However, the Court observed, if a debtor chose not to cooperate in a chapter 11 case, the bankruptcy court could simply to convert the case to a chapter 7 liquidation.

=== Justice Stevens' dissent ===
Justice Stevens dissented, acknowledging that "[t]he Court's reading of the statute is plausible," given that the statutory language does not expressly exclude non-business debtors from chapter 11 and the Senate Report language quoted in the majority opinion. Nonetheless, Stevens disagreed with the Court's conclusion, opining that chapter 11 of the Bankruptcy Code was intended to apply to business debtors only.

In support of his view, Stevens noted that chapter 11 is entitled "Reorganization," and that the statutory language of chapter 11 refer repeatedly to a "business." Additionally, while section 109(d) of the Bankruptcy Code provides that only a person that may be a debtor under chapter 7 may be a debtor under chapter 11, it does not provide that all persons eligible under chapter 7 may also file under chapter 11.

Turning to legislative history to resolve this ambiguity, Stevens agreed that the Senate Report assumes that only businesses would ever file under chapter 11. While the Senate Report does not exclude the possibility that individuals may make use of that chapter as well, it notes that the cost of filing for chapter 11 would likely prevent individuals from using it. Moreover, Justice Stevens continued, the corresponding House Report "unambiguously states that a Chapter 7 liquidation is 'the only remedy' for 'consumer debtors [who] are unable to avail themselves of the relief provided under chapter 13.'"

Stevens also stressed that the Code allows involuntary chapter 11 cases and that if individuals not engaged in business were subject to chapter 11, the Code does not protect them from being subject to such a filing. For these reasons, Stevens concluded in dissent that chapter 11 should apply only to "business debtors."

== Discussion ==
Toibb stands for the counterintuitive proposition that individuals can file for chapter 11 "reorganization" under the Bankruptcy Code. The complexity and cost of chapter 11 bankruptcy is rather high (the case-filing fee alone is $1,738). However, a New York Times article reports that chapter 11 may be "an attractive alternative for individuals who have relatively large debts and relatively large income, or at least the expectation of future income, with which to finance a repayment plan."

Toibb has not been overruled by any subsequent decision of the Supreme Court, and although the Bankruptcy Code has since been amended, individuals remain eligible to file for bankruptcy under Chapter 11.

== See also ==
- List of United States Supreme Court cases, volume 501
- List of United States Supreme Court cases
- Lists of United States Supreme Court cases by volume
- List of United States Supreme Court cases by the Rehnquist Court
