= Cooper Industries, Inc. v. Leatherman Tool Group, Inc. =

Cooper Industries v. Leatherman Tool Group
- Supreme Court of the United States

Argued February 26, 2001 Decided May 14, 2001
- Full case name: Cooper Industries, Inc. v. Leatherman Tool Group, Inc.
- Citations: 532 U.S. 424 (more) 121 S. Ct. 1678; 149 L. Ed. 2d 674; 69 U.S.L.W. 4299; 58 U.S.P.Q.2d (BNA) 1641

Case history
- Prior: 205 F.3d 1351 (9th Cir. 1999)

Holding
- Courts of Appeals should apply a de novo standard when reviewing district court determinations of the constitutionality of punitive damages awards. The Ninth Circuit erred in applying the less demanding abuse-of-discretion standard in this case.

Court membership
- Chief Justice William Rehnquist Associate Justices John P. Stevens · Sandra Day O'Connor; Antonin Scalia · Anthony Kennedy; David Souter · Clarence Thomas; Ruth Bader Ginsburg · Stephen Breyer

Case opinions
- Majority: Stevens, joined by Rehnquist, O'Connor, Kennedy, Souter, Thomas, Breyer
- Concurrence: Thomas
- Concurrence: Scalia
- Dissent: Ginsburg

Laws applied
- U.S. Const. amends. VIII, XIV

Cooper Industries, Inc. v. Leatherman Tool Group, Inc., 532 U.S. 424 (2001), was a decision by the United States Supreme Court involving the standard of review that Federal Appeal Courts should use when examining punitive damages awards.

== Prior history ==
Leatherman Tool Group made a multifunction tool that was arguably uniquely new at the time of its introduction. In 1995, Cooper Industries, a competing toolmaker, decided to enter the same market niche with a similar tool. The competing product was originally to be nearly identical to the original, save a few cosmetic changes. When introducing the new tool at the 1996 National Hardware Show, the advertising materials, catalogs, and a mock-up were, in fact, modified versions of the original Leatherman tool.

After the trade show, Leatherman Tool Group filed a civil suit against Cooper Industries asserting claims of trade-dress infringement, unfair competition, and false advertising under the Lanham Act and a common-law claim of unfair competition for advertising and selling an imitation. In October 1997, a federal jury returned a verdict against Cooper Industries on the false advertising, imitation, and unfair competition claims and assessed damages. It awarded Leatherman Tool Group $50,000.00 in compensatory damages and $4.5 Million in punitive damages. The Ninth Circuit Court of Appeals affirmed the punitive damages on appeal, stating that the damages were not "grossly excessive" under BMW of North America, Inc. v. Gore 517 U.S. 559 (1996).

== Case ==
The case was argued on February 26, 2001. Cooper Industries asked the Court to decide whether the Court of Appeals reviewed the constitutionality of the punitive damages award under the correct standard.

Because the Court itself has recognized that determining if a fine is grossly excessive is "inherently imprecise" Gore held that it was necessary to evaluate a number of factors.

- The degree of the defendant's reprehensibility or culpability
- The relationship between the penalty and the harm to the victim caused by the defendant's actions
- The sanctions imposed in other cases for comparable misconduct

The Appeals Court has the responsibility on appeal of determining if the lower District court had evaluated these factors correctly. Instead of merely deciding whether the lower court had abused its judicial discretion, the punitive damages should be reviewed in their entirety. By doing so, the Appeals courts would ensure that the courts in its circuit applied these standards in a uniform manner and that citizens would receive uniform treatment.

== Effects of the decision ==
In making its decision, the Court extended the holding in Furman v. Georgia 408 U.S. 238 (1972) that the Eighth Amendment applied to the states through the Fourteenth Amendment. While Furman confirmed the earlier incorporation of the 8th Amendment's Cruel and Unusual Punishment clause in Robinson v. California, 370 U.S. 660, 667 (1962) Cooper Industries v. Leatherman Tool Group incorporated the Excessive Fines clause.

The Court later seemed to back away from this holding. Justice Stevens' Opinion for the Court directly stated: "...the Fourteenth Amendment's Due Process Clause imposes substantive limits on the States' discretion, making the Eighth Amendment's prohibition against excessive fines and cruel and unusual punishments applicable to the States." Nine years later, however, in a footnote to his Opinion for the Court in McDonald v. City of Chicago, 561 U.S. ___ (2010), Justice Alito wrote: "We never have decided whether the Third Amendment or the Eighth Amendment’s prohibition of excessive fines applies to the States through the Due Process Clause." The discrepancy between these two views was resolved in Timbs v. Indiana, wherein the Court unanimously ruled that the Eighth Amendment's prohibition of excessive fines is an incorporated protection applicable to the states under the Fourteenth Amendment.

== Subsequent history ==
On remand to the Ninth Circuit, applying the de novo review standard the Appeals court reduced the punitive damages to $500,000.00. [citation: http://www.ca9.uscourts.gov/coa/newopinions.nsf/970AC2B13F32751B88256BAE00575CFB/$file/9835147.pdf?openelement]

== See also ==
- List of United States Supreme Court cases, volume 532
- List of United States Supreme Court cases
