= Buford v. United States =

- Supreme Court of the United States

Argued January 8, 2001 Decided March 20, 2001
- Full case name: Paula L. Buford v. United States
- Citations: 532 U.S. 59 (more) 121 S. Ct. 1276; 149 L. Ed. 2d 197

Case history
- Prior: United States v. Buford, 201 F.3d 937 (7th Cir. 2000)
- Subsequent: Sentence affirmed

Holding
- The courts of appeal must give deferential review to decisions of district courts under the Sentencing Guidelines on the question of consolidation of a defendant's prior convictions.

Court membership
- Chief Justice William Rehnquist Associate Justices John P. Stevens · Sandra Day O'Connor; Antonin Scalia · Anthony Kennedy; David Souter · Clarence Thomas; Ruth Bader Ginsburg · Stephen Breyer

Case opinion
- Majority: Breyer, joined by unanimous

Laws applied
- Due Process

Buford v. United States, 532 U.S. 59 (2001), was a United States Supreme Court case decided in 2001. The case concerned whether federal appellate courts should give deferential or de novo review of certain Sentencing Guideline determinations made by a trial judge. The court held that the courts of appeal must give deferential review to decisions of district courts under the Sentencing Guidelines on the question of consolidation of a defendant's prior convictions.

== Background ==
The United States Sentencing Guidelines are the series of rules which guide a federal trial judge in issuing a sentence to a convicted individual. In Buford, the trial judge had to determine whether certain prior convictions relating to drug-crime arrests should be considered 'related' or 'consolidated'. The judge ruled they should not (and thus count as five individual priors) and the Seventh Circuit Court of Appeals affirmed. The appellate court did not re-review the facts (de novo review), instead only reviewing certain legal aspects of the determination. Buford appealed to the U.S. Supreme Court on the grounds that the appellate court should have re-reviewed the determinations of the trial judge rather than defer to him.

== Opinion of the Court ==
Justice Breyer delivered the unanimous Opinion of the Court. He began by stating that the question in the case is "a narrow one" that is simply based on the standard of review for appellate courts when reviewing this specific technical determination made by District Courts. Although it was a simple issue, seven circuit courts of appeal had differed on the standard to take. Breyer, turning to the actual question of the standard of review, argued for a deferential framing. "The district court", he wrote, "is in a better position than the appellate court to decide whether a particular set of individual circumstances demonstrates 'functional consolidation'". Because the Seventh Circuit had given deference instead of de novo (completely new) review of the lower court's determinations, the decision was affirmed. Buford's sentence remained the same.
