= Norfolk Shipbuilding & Drydock Corp. v. Garris =

NORFOLK SHIPBUILDING & DRYDOCK CORPORATION, Petitioner, v. Celestine GARRIS, Administratrix of the Estate of Christopher Garris, Deceased
- Supreme Court of the United States

Argued April 18, 2001 Decided June 4, 2001
- Full case name: Norfolk Shipbuilding & Drydock Corp. v. Garris (2001)
- Docket no.: 00–346
- Citations: 532 U.S. 811 (more) 121 S.Ct. 1927; 150 L.Ed.2d 34
- Argument: Oral argument
- Opinion announcement: Opinion announcement

Holding
- There is a cause of action for negligence under maritime law; the negligent breach of general maritime duty of care was actionable when it caused death.

Court membership
- Chief Justice William Rehnquist Associate Justices John P. Stevens · Sandra Day O'Connor; Antonin Scalia · Anthony Kennedy; David Souter · Clarence Thomas; Ruth Bader Ginsburg · Stephen Breyer

Norfolk Shipbuilding Drydock Corporation v. Garris, 532 U.S. 811 (2001), is a Supreme Court case addressing whether the a cause of action for negligence exists under maritime law.

== Facts ==
Christopher Garris was a harbor worker who died as a result of a drydock company's employee's negligence. Garris's mother brought an action as administratrix of his estate against the company, Norfolk Shipbuilding & Drydock Corporation, invoking federal admiralty jurisdiction and seeking damages under general maritime law. The United States District Court for the Eastern District of Virginia dismissed the claim for want of a cause of action. The United States Court of Appeals for the Fourth Circuit reversed and remanded, and the Supreme Court granted certiorari.

== Opinion ==
The Court considered the history of common law torts as it applies to maritime law. The Court ultimately held that a negligent breach of the general maritime duty of care was actionable when it caused death. In doing so, the Court extended the application of its holding in Moragne v. States Marine Lines, Inc. which had overruled a prior holding in The Harrisburg, and analyzed the phrase “violation of maritime duties” in Moragne to determine whether the complained-of conduct fell within its scope. The Court held that developments in maritime law, including the emergence of state wrongful death statutes and the passage of both Death on the High Seas Act (DOHSA) and the Jones Act, had undermined its decision in The Harrisburg.
