= Pollard v. E. I. du Pont de Nemours & Co. =

- Supreme Court of the United States

Decided June 4, 2001
- Full case name: Pollard v. E. I. du Pont de Nemours & Co.
- Citations: 532 U.S. 843 (more)

Holding
- Front pay is not an element of compensatory damages under the Civil Rights Act of 1991 and thus is not subject to the damages cap imposed by the Act.

Court membership
- Chief Justice William Rehnquist Associate Justices John P. Stevens · Sandra Day O'Connor; Antonin Scalia · Anthony Kennedy; David Souter · Clarence Thomas; Ruth Bader Ginsburg · Stephen Breyer

Case opinion
- Majority: Thomas, joined by unanimous

Laws applied
- Civil Rights Act of 1991

Pollard v. E. I. du Pont de Nemours & Co., 532 U.S. 843 (2001), was a United States Supreme Court case in which the Court held that front pay is not an element of compensatory damages under the Civil Rights Act of 1991 and thus is not subject to the damages cap imposed by the Act. Front pay, as opposed to back pay, is a "monetary remedy available when circumstances dictate that it is not possible for the employee to be reinstated."
