= Wharf (Holdings) Ltd. v. United International Holdings, Inc. =

Wharf (Holdings) Ltd. v. United Int'l Holdings, Inc.
- Supreme Court of the United States

Argued March 21, 2001 Decided May 21, 2001
- Full case name: Wharf Holdings Limited, Petitioners, v. United International Holdings, Incorporated, Respondents
- Citations: 532 U.S. 588 (more) 121 S. Ct. 1776; 149 L. Ed. 2d 845

Case history
- Prior: Jury verdict in favor of defendant; upheld, 210 F.3d 1207 (10th Cir. 2000)

Holding
- An oral agreement to grant an option to buy stock, while secretly intending not to honor the option, violates the Securities Exchange Act of 1934.

Court membership
- Chief Justice William Rehnquist Associate Justices John P. Stevens · Sandra Day O'Connor; Antonin Scalia · Anthony Kennedy; David Souter · Clarence Thomas; Ruth Bader Ginsburg · Stephen Breyer

Case opinion
- Majority: Breyer, joined by unanimous

Laws applied
- Securities Exchange Act of 1934

Wharf Holdings Ltd. v. United Int'l Holdings, Inc., 532 U.S. 588 (2001), was a United States Supreme Court case decided in 2001. The case concerned a provision of the Securities Exchange Act of 1934 dealing with manipulating and evading rules set by the SEC. The Court concluded that a secret understanding to violate an arrangement under the Act still constituted a violation, rejecting an argument that oral contracts were categorically excluded from the provision's coverage.

== Background ==
In return for United International Holdings, Inc.'s assistance in preparing its application, contracts, system, and financing for a cable television system in Hong Kong, Wharf Holdings Ltd. orally granted United an option to buy 10% of stock in the system. The agreement was never written down. Ultimately, Wharf refused to allow United to exercise its option. United then sued Wharf in the United States District Court for the District of Colorado, claiming that Wharf violated the Securities Exchange Act of 1934, which prohibits using "any manipulative or deceptive device or contrivance...in connection with the purchase or sale of any security." Wharf's internal documents, which suggested that Wharf never intended to carry out its promise, supported United's claim. A jury found in United Holdings' favor, finding a violation of the 1934 Act. The Court of Appeals for the Tenth Circuit affirmed.

== Opinion of the Court ==
Justice Stephen Breyer wrote the unanimous decision of the Court, which affirmed the Tenth Circuit. The Court held that an oral agreement to give an option to buy stock while secretly intending never to honor that option violates the Securities Exchange Act of 1934's prohibition of deceptive devices. Justice Breyer wrote for the Court that there was no "convincing reason to interpret the Act to exclude oral contracts as a class. The Act itself says that it applies to 'any contract' for the purchase or sale of a security." Under this reasoning, the Tenth Circuit was correct in affirming the jury's verdict, and Wharf Limited was found to have violated the 1934 Act.
