= Bartnicki v. Vopper =

- Supreme Court of the United States

Argued December 5, 2000 Decided May 21, 2001
- Full case name: Bartnicki et al. v. Vopper, aka Williams, et al.
- Citations: 532 U.S. 514 (more) 121 S. Ct. 1753; 149 L. Ed. 2d 787; 2001 U.S. LEXIS 3815

Case history
- Prior: 200 F.3d 109 (3d Cir. 1999); cert. granted, 530 U.S. 1260 (2000).

Holding
- A broadcaster cannot be held civilly liable for publishing documents or tapes illegally procured by a third-party.

Court membership
- Chief Justice William Rehnquist Associate Justices John P. Stevens · Sandra Day O'Connor; Antonin Scalia · Anthony Kennedy; David Souter · Clarence Thomas; Ruth Bader Ginsburg · Stephen Breyer

Case opinions
- Majority: Stevens, joined by O'Connor, Kennedy, Souter, Ginsburg, Breyer
- Concurrence: Breyer, joined by O'Connor
- Dissent: Rehnquist, joined by Scalia, Thomas

Bartnicki v. Vopper, 532 U.S. 514 (2001), is a United States Supreme Court case relieving a media defendant of liability for broadcasting a taped conversation of a labor official talking to other union members about a teachers' strike.

At trial, the parties stipulated that the taped conversation had been recorded in violation of the Electronic Communications Privacy Act. Nevertheless, the Court held the broadcast was legal.

== Background ==
In 1992 and 1993 the Pennsylvania State Education Association, a teachers' union, was engaged in collective bargaining negotiations with the Wyoming Valley West School Board. In May 1993, the union's chief negotiator, Gloria Bartnicki, was surreptitiously recorded speaking by phone with union president Anthony Kane. Referring to the collective bargaining negotiations, which had grown contentious, Kane said: "If they're not gonna move for three percent, we're gonna have to go to their, their homes. . . . To blow off their front porches, we'll have to do some work on some of those guys. (PAUSES). Really, uh, really and truthfully because this is, you know, this is bad news. (UNDECIPHERABLE)."

The intercepted conversation was ultimately broadcast by Fredrick Vopper, a talk radio host. Vopper had received a tape of the conversation from Jack Yocum, who was president of a local taxpayers' association and a vocal opponent of the union. Yocum, in turn, claimed to have obtained the tape from an anonymous tipster. Thus, the identity of the individual who carried out the initial illegal act of wiretapping was not known. This presented the Court with a novel issue: Whether enforcing anti-wiretapping statutes against individuals who merely disseminate material illegally obtained by others runs afoul of the First Amendment, which protects the right of individuals to engage in speech on matters of public concern.

== Decision ==
The Court held the radio station not liable because the radio station itself had done nothing illegal to obtain the tape. The case is often used to stand for the proposition that media defendants are not liable for broadcast material even if a third party violated the law to obtain it.

=== Dissenting opinion ===
Chief Justice William Rehnquist, in his dissenting opinion, was concerned with the effect that the decision would have on speech. He noted that 40 states, the District of Columbia, and the federal government had laws prohibiting knowingly disclosing (publishing) illegally intercepted electronic communications. He also argued that that disclosure would produce a chilling effect in the creation of initial, albeit electronic, speech:

The Court holds that all of these statutes violate the First Amendment insofar as the illegally intercepted conversation touches upon a matter of "public concern," an amorphous concept that the Court does not even attempt to define. But the Court's decision diminishes, rather than enhances, the purposes of the First Amendment, thereby chilling the speech of the millions of Americans who rely upon electronic technology to communicate each day.

== Implications ==
While the Court declared the relevant wiretapping statutes unconstitutional as applied, the precedential value of the case remains unclear. Under one reading of the majority opinion, courts should apply "strict scrutiny" in reviewing restrictions on the dissemination of illegally obtained information whenever that information touches on a matter of public concern. This expansive standard would provide robust First Amendment protection to media outlets engaging in the publication of stolen materials. Application of such a rule might, for instance, insulate controversial whistleblower entities like WikiLeaks from liability for publishing government secrets. A much narrower reading is offered by Justice Stephen Breyer's concurring opinion, which was joined by Justice Sandra Day O'Connor. Breyer's concurrence would limit First Amendment protection only to instances in which the stolen information involved threats of physical harm. Others contend the opinion endorses an ad hoc balancing test, requiring courts to engage in a freeform, case-by-case analysis of the relative weight of various interests surrounding disclosure.

The behavior of the lower courts after Bartnicki indicates that in practice, the opinion is being construed narrowly. According to one commentator, writing ten years after Bartnicki was decided, "in no case reported to date has the holding in Bartnicki been applied to reach a similar conclusion in an analogous case." It thus appears that Justice Breyer's narrow construction of the holding, which sought to limit the case to its unique facts, has effectively carried the day.

== Related cases ==
- In a 2007 case, Jean v. Massachusetts State Police, the United States District Court for the District of Massachusetts held that it was legal to post a video which was lawfully obtained from another.
- On April 20, 2010, the Supreme Court held in United States v. Stevens (the so-called animal torture video case) that the government, with limited exceptions, cannot hold criminally liable someone who distributes a tape of an illegal act if the person had not been complicit in the commission thereof.

== See also ==
- List of United States Supreme Court cases, volume 532
- List of United States Supreme Court cases
