= Department of the Interior v. Klamath Water Users Protective Ass'n =

Department of Interior v. Klamath Water Users Protective Assn.
- Supreme Court of the United States

Argued January 20, 2001 Decided March 5, 2001
- Full case name: Department of the Interior and Bureau of Indian Affairs, Petitoners, v. Klamath Water Users Protective Association
- Citations: 532 U.S. 1 (more) 121 S. Ct. 1060; 149 L. Ed. 2d 87

Case history
- Prior: 189 F.3d 1034 (9th Cir. 1999)

Holding
- Documents shared between the Klamath tribe and the Department of the Interior, which address tribal interests subject to state and federal proceedings to determine water allocations, are not exempt from the Freedom of Information Act.

Court membership
- Chief Justice William Rehnquist Associate Justices John P. Stevens · Sandra Day O'Connor; Antonin Scalia · Anthony Kennedy; David Souter · Clarence Thomas; Ruth Bader Ginsburg · Stephen Breyer

Case opinion
- Majority: Souter, joined by unanimous

Laws applied
- Freedom of Information Act

Department of Interior v. Klamath Water Users Protective Assn., 532 U.S. 1 (2001), was a United States Supreme Court case decided in 2001. The case concerned whether Exemption 5 of the Freedom of Information Act, which applies to "intra agency memoranda or letters", is applicable to documents within the Department of the Interior which discussed plans for the allocation of water in the Klamath River Basin. The Court held unanimously that the exemption did not apply.

== Background ==
The Department of the Interior's Bureau of Reclamation administered the Klamath Irrigation Project, which uses water from the Klamath River Basin to irrigate parts of Oregon and California. In order for the department to provide water allocations among competing uses and users, it asked the Klamath and other Indian Tribes to consult with the Bureau of Reclamation over future allocations. A memorandum of understanding solidified this relationship. When the Department's Bureau of Indian Affairs filed claims on behalf of the Klamath Tribe in Oregon to allocate water rights, the two exchanged written memoranda on the appropriate scope of the claims submitted by the Government for the benefit of the Tribe. Afterwards, the Klamath Water Users Protective Association, a nonprofit group whose members receive water from the Project and, generally, have interests adverse to the tribal interest because of the scarcity of water, filed requests with the Bureau under the Freedom of Information Act to gain access to communications between the Bureau and the Basin Tribes. Some documents were turned over, but the Bureau held other documents under the deliberative process privileges incorporated in Freedom of Information Act (FOIA) Exemption 5, which exempts from disclosure "inter-agency or intra-agency memorandums or letters which would not be available by law to a party other than an agency in litigation with the agency." The Association sued to compel release of the documents. The District Court granted the government summary judgment, rejecting the attempt to attain the documents.

In reversing, the Ninth Circuit Court of Appeals ruled out any application of Exemption 5 on the ground that the Tribes with whom the department had consultations with have a direct interest in the subject matter of the consultations. The ultimate decision by the Supreme Court took less than three months from oral argument to the opinion being released.

== Opinion of the Court ==
Justice David Souter wrote the unanimous opinion of the Court which affirmed the Ninth Circuit. The Court agreed with the appellate court that there is no exemption under FOIA for the internal documents between the Klamath tribe and the Bureau which dealt with the water allocation issue. This is because in the correspondence the Bureau did not act in the role that their personnel usually fulfils, in that personnel do not represent their own interests. The Bureau officials were working with the Tribe, advocating their interests which meant the documents were not exempt from public disclosure of intra-agency communications. Souter wrote that "all of this boils down to requesting that we read an 'Indian trust' exemption into the statute, a reading that is out of the question". In concluding, Souter noted that Congress realized that not every secret under the previous version of FOIA would be kept secret under the newer version.

== See also ==
- Ninth Amendment
- List of FOIA Exemptions
