= McNeil v. Wisconsin =

- Supreme Court of the United States

Argued February 26, 1991 Decided June 13, 1991
- Full case name: Paul McNeil v. State of Wisconsin
- Citations: 501 U.S. 171 (more) 111 S. Ct. 2204; 115 L. Ed. 2d 158

Case history
- Prior: Defendant was convicted of murder, and the conviction was affirmed by the Wisconsin Supreme Court. The U.S. Supreme Court granted a writ of certiorari.

Holding
- Invoking the Sixth Amendment right to counsel does not implicitly invoke rights secured by Miranda v. Arizona.

Court membership
- Chief Justice William Rehnquist Associate Justices Byron White · Thurgood Marshall; Harry Blackmun · John P. Stevens; Sandra Day O'Connor · Antonin Scalia; Anthony Kennedy · David Souter

Case opinions
- Majority: Scalia, joined by Rehnquist, White, O'Connor, Kennedy, Souter
- Concurrence: Kennedy
- Dissent: Stevens, joined by Marshall, Blackmun

Laws applied
- U.S. Const. amends. V, VI

McNeil v. Wisconsin, 501 U.S. 171 (1991), held that the right to counsel secured by the Sixth Amendment and the right to counsel protected by Miranda v. Arizona are separate and distinct, such that invoking one does not implicitly invoke the other.

== Facts ==
Paul McNeil was arrested in May 1987 on suspicion that he had committed armed robbery in West Allis, Wisconsin, near Milwaukee. He invoked his Miranda rights, and the police ceased questioning him. He was arraigned, and a bail hearing was held. He was represented by a public defender at this hearing. After the bail hearing, McNeil was approached by other detectives investigating a murder in Caledonia, Wisconsin, near Racine.

McNeil waived his Miranda rights when talking to the detective about the Caledonia murder. McNeil denied being there, however. Two days later, the detective returned; this time, McNeil again waived his Miranda rights but admitted being involved in the Caledonia murder along with two other men. Two days after, that the detectives interviewed McNeil for a third time. This time, McNeil waived his Miranda rights and then admitted he had lied to the police in the previous interview regarding the involvement of one of the other men.

Eventually, McNeil was tried for the Caledonia murder. He moved to suppress the three statements about that incident he had given to the police because they had violated his right to counsel. After all, a lawyer at the bail hearing on the West Allis robbery had represented him. The trial court denied the motion, and McNeil was convicted and sentenced to 60 years.

McNeil appealed, arguing that the trial court should have suppressed his three statements to the police regarding the Caledonia murder. The Wisconsin Supreme Court affirmed the conviction, and the U.S. Supreme Court agreed to hear the case.

== Opinion of the Court ==
In an opinion for the Court, Justice Scalia agreed with the lower courts that the fact that McNeil had been represented by a lawyer at the bail hearing on the West Allis robbery charge did not give McNeil a right to counsel concerning the Caledonia murders. The Sixth Amendment right to counsel is offense-specific and cannot be invoked once for all future prosecutions. In Michigan v. Jackson, 475 U.S. 625 (1986), the Court had held that once the Sixth Amendment right to counsel attaches, the police may not question a defendant regarding that crime. However, implicit in the Jackson ruling was that the protection against subsequent interrogation related only to the crime with which the defendant had been charged. Because McNeil had not been charged with the Caledonia crimes at the time of the bail hearing on the West Allis hearing, the Sixth Amendment could not have given McNeil a way to avoid police questioning about the Caledonia murder.

Although both the Sixth Amendment and the Fifth Amendment (through Miranda) involve a rights to counsel, these right to counsel guard against two different risks. The Sixth Amendment preserves a defendant's right to meet the "expert adversary" of the government with an equally skilled adversary. The Miranda right to counsel, by contrast, guards against the inherently coercive nature of police interrogation and ensures that criminal suspects give statements to the police voluntarily. Thus, Miranda's right to counsel is not offense-specific, for once a suspect has invoked Miranda's protection, the police may not approach him again.

A criminal defendant may give up either or both of these rights, of course, but the standards for doing so are quite different. "One might be quite willing to speak to the police without counsel present concerning many matters, but not the matter under prosecution. It can be said, perhaps, that it is likely that one who has asked for counsel's assistance in defending against a prosecution would want counsel present for all custodial interrogation, even interrogation unrelated to the charge." Thus, waivers of Miranda rights are generally situation-specific and easy to accomplish, while waivers of the right to counsel for purposes of trial waive it for not only the trial but ancillary proceedings as well, and is correspondingly more difficult to effectuate.

The Court acknowledged that it might have the power to link the two waivers, but it would be imprudent. If having a lawyer for one prosecution meant that a criminal defendant could not be questioned regarding any crime at all without the lawyer's presence, "most persons in pretrial custody for serious offenses would be unapproachable by police officers suspecting them of involvement in other crimes, even though they have never expressed any unwillingness to be questioned."

== See also ==
- List of United States Supreme Court cases, volume 501
- List of United States Supreme Court cases
- Lists of United States Supreme Court cases by volume
- List of United States Supreme Court cases by the Rehnquist Court
