= Booth v. Churner =

- Supreme Court of the United States

Argued March 20, 2001 Decided May 29, 2001
- Full case name: Timothy Booth, v. C.O. Churner, et al.
- Citations: 532 U.S. 731 (more) 121 S. Ct. 1819; 149 L. Ed. 2d 958

Case history
- Prior: Complaint dismissed (M.D. Pa., 1997); affirmed, 206 F.3d 289 (3d Cir. 2000)

Holding
- Prisoners who seek only monetary damages in suits over prison conditions still must exhaust all administrative remedies before going to court, even if monetary damages are not available under the particular administrative process.

Court membership
- Chief Justice William Rehnquist Associate Justices John P. Stevens · Sandra Day O'Connor; Antonin Scalia · Anthony Kennedy; David Souter · Clarence Thomas; Ruth Bader Ginsburg · Stephen Breyer

Case opinion
- Majority: Souter, joined by unanimous

Laws applied
- Prison Litigation Reform Act of 1995

Booth v. Churner, 532 U.S. 731 (2001), was a United States Supreme Court case decided in 2001. The case concerned the extent to which a state prisoner must first utilize an administrative review process provided by the state, prior to filing a case in federal district court. The Court held that Booth still had a mechanism of administrative review, and thus his claim was premature.

== Background ==
The Prison Litigation Reform Act of 1995 requires a prisoner to exhaust "such administrative remedies as are available" before suing over prison conditions. Timothy Booth, an inmate at the State Correctional Institution at Smithfield, Pennsylvania, filed a suit in District Court, claiming that corrections officers violated his Eighth Amendment right to be free from cruel and unusual punishment. Booth sought both injunctive relief and monetary damages. At the time of Booth's suit, Pennsylvania provided an administrative grievance and appeals system, which addressed Booth's complaints but had no provision for recovery of money damages. After the prison authority denied his administrative grievance, Booth did not seek administrative review. Subsequently, the District Court dismissed the complaint for failure to exhaust administrative remedies. In affirming, the Third Circuit Court of Appeals rejected Booth's argument that the exhaustion requirement was inapplicable because the administrative process could not award him the monetary relief he sought.

He appealed to the United States Supreme Court, which agreed to hear his case. The attorneys general of over 30 states filed amicus curiae briefs at the Court, urging affirmance of the decision.

== Opinion of the Court ==
Justice David Souter wrote the unanimous majority opinion of the court, which agreed with the Third Circuit in rejecting Booth's claims. The Court held that even though the prison grievance procedure did not provide for requested monetary relief, Booth was nonetheless required to exhaust administrative remedies before filing suit with respect to prison conditions. Justice Souter wrote for the Court, "we think that Congress has mandated exhaustion clearly enough, regardless of the relief offered through administrative procedures." Therefore, Booth's suit was premature.
