= List of United States Supreme Court cases, volume 532 =

This is a list of all the United States Supreme Court cases from volume 532 of the United States Reports:

Case name	Citation	Date decided
Department of Interior v. Klamath Water Users Protective Assn.	532 U.S. 1	2001
Documents shared between the Klamath tribe and the Department of the Interior, which address tribal interests subject to state and federal proceedings to determine water allocations, are not exempt from the Freedom of Information Act.
Ohio v. Reiner	532 U.S. 17	2001
Reiterated that the protection of the Fifth Amendment is for the innocent as well as the wrongdoer from Grunewald v. United States.
TrafFix Devices, Inc v. Marketing Displays, Inc.	532 U.S. 23	2001
There can be no trademark protection for something that is functional.
Shafer v. South Carolina	532 U.S. 36	2001
Where a capital defendant's future dangerousness is at issue, and the only sentencing alternative to death is life imprisonment without the possibility of parole, due process entitles the defendant to inform the jury of his future parole ineligibility.
Buford v. United States	532 U.S. 59	2001
The courts of appeal must give deferential review to decisions of district courts under the Sentencing Guidelines on the question of consolidation of a defendant's prior convictions.
Ferguson v. Charleston	532 U.S. 67	2001
A state hospital's attempt to gather evidence of a patient's criminal conduct for law enforcement purposes constitutes an unreasonable search unless the patient consents.
Circuit City Stores, Inc. v. Adams	532 U.S. 105	2001
The Federal Arbitration Act's exception of "contracts of employment of seamen, railroad employees, or other classes of workers engaged in interstate commerce" does not apply to general employment contracts.
Egelhoff v. Egelhoff	532 U.S. 141	2001
State statutes having a connection with ERISA plans are superseded by the Employee Retirement Income Security Act of 1974 (ERISA).
Texas v. Cobb	532 U.S. 162	2001
Because the Sixth Amendment right to counsel is "offense specific," it does not extend to offenses that are "factually related" to those that have actually been charged.
Lujan v. G & G Fire Sprinklers, Inc.	532 U.S. 189	2001
Even though there is no hearing under the state contractual scheme, because plaintiffs can bring claims in state court, there is no violation of due process.
United States v. Cleveland Indians Baseball Co.	532 U.S. 200	2001
Wages are to be taxed on the year they were actually paid.
Shaw v. Murphy	532 U.S. 223	2001
There is no First Amendment right for an incarcerated person to provide legal assistance to another incarcerated person.
Easley v. Cromartie	532 U.S. 234	2001
The District Court's conclusion that the State violated the Equal Protection Clause in drawing the 1997 boundaries was based on clearly erroneous findings.
Clark County School Dist. v. Breeden	532 U.S. 268	2001
Plaintiff's complaint about a report of a sex-related comment was not protected. No reasonable person could have believed that this particular single incident would violate Title VII standard.
Alexander v. Sandoval	532 U.S. 275	2001
There is no private right of action to enforce disparate-impact regulations promulgated under Title VI of the Civil Rights Act of 1964.
Atwater v. Lago Vista	532 U.S. 318	2001
Police may make a warrantless arrest when someone commits a misdemeanor offense.
Daniels v. United States	532 U.S. 374	2001
A federal defendant, sentenced under the Armed Career Criminal Act of 1984, may not challenge his federal sentence through a motion that his prior convictions were unconstitutionally obtained.
Lackawanna County District Attorney v. Coss	532 U.S. 394	2001
Habeas relief is unavailable to state prisoners who challenge a sentence on the ground that it was enhanced on an unconstitutional prior conviction.
C & L Enterprises, Inc. v. Citizen Band Potawatomi Tribe of Okla.	532 U.S. 411	2001
An Indian Tribe waives its sovereign immunity when it enters into a contract that provides for arbitration and being heard in a state court.
Cooper Industries, Inc. v. Leatherman Tool Group, Inc.	532 U.S. 424	2001
Courts of Appeals should apply a de novo standard when reviewing district court determinations of the constitutionality of punitive damages awards. The Ninth Circuit erred in applying the less demanding abuse-of-discretion standard in this case.
Rogers v. Tennessee	532 U.S. 451	2001
The Supreme Court of Tennessee's decision to overturn the year and a day rule and convict the defendant was not a violation of either the Ex Post Facto clause or of due process principles.
United States v. Oakland Cannabis Buyers' Cooperative	532 U.S. 483	2001
There is no medical necessity defense to a charge under the Controlled Substances Act.
Major League Baseball Players Assn. v. Garvey	532 U.S. 504	2001
Judicial review of a labor-arbitration decision pursuant to such an agreement is very limited. Courts are not authorized to review the arbitrator's decision on the merits despite allegations that the decision rests on factual errors or misinterprets the parties' agreement. It is only when the arbitrator strays from interpretation and application of the agreement and effectively 'dispenses his own brand of industrial justice' that his decision may be unenforceable.
Bartnicki v. Vopper	532 U.S. 514	2001
A broadcaster cannot be held civilly liable for publishing documents or tapes illegally procured by a third-party.
United States v. Hatter	532 U.S. 557	2001
The Compensation Clause bars the government from collecting Social Security taxes from federal judges who held office before Congress extended those taxes; Medicare taxes can be collected.
Wharf (Holdings) Ltd. v. United Int'l Holdings, Inc.	532 U.S. 588	2001
An oral agreement to grant an option to buy stock, while secretly intending not to honor the option, violates the Securities Exchange Act of 1934.
Buckhannon Board & Care Home, Inc. v. West Virginia Dept. of Health and Human Resources	532 U.S. 598	2001
An award of attorneys fee to a "prevailing party" must be to a party that has received a judgment on the merits or a court-ordered consent decree.
Atkinson Trading Co. v. Shirley	532 U.S. 645	2001
The Navajo Nation's imposition of a hotel occupancy tax upon nonmembers on non-Indian fee land within its reservation is invalid
PGA Tour, Inc. v. Martin	532 U.S. 661	2001
The PGA Tour is required to adhere to the Americans with Disabilities Act.
NLRB v. Kentucky River Community Care, Inc.	532 U.S. 706	2001
1. Respondent carries the burden of proving the nurses' supervisory status in the representation hearing and unfair labor practice proceeding 2. The Board's test for determining supervisory status was inconsistent with the Act.
Booth v. Churner	532 U.S. 731	2001
Prisoners who seek only monetary damages in suits over prison conditions still must exhaust all administrative remedies before going to court, even if monetary damages are not available under the particular administrative process.
New Hampshire v. Maine	532 U.S. 742	2001
Consent decree stipulated between parties and agreed to by parties is permissible under Vermont v. New York, 417 U.S. 270 (1974). States are not adjusting the boundary between them, which was fixed by the 1740 decree; the consent decree simply locates precisely the already existing boundary, and neither State is enhancing its power and threatening supremacy of the Federal Government.
Becker v. Montgomery	532 U.S. 757	2001
The Federal Rules requiring a notice of appeal to be signed derives from Rule 11(a), and so does the remedy for a signature's omission; the Sixth Circuit should have accepted Becker's corrected notice.
Arkansas v. Sullivan	532 U.S. 769	2001
State supreme courts cannot interpret and establish greater protections under the federal Constitution than the Supreme Court has.
Florida v. Thomas	532 U.S. 774	2001
The writ of certiorari was improvidently granted as the Florida state courts have not made a 'reviewable final-judgement'.
Penry v. Johnson	532 U.S. 782	2001
A Texas trial court's supplemental instruction on mitigating evidence of mental retardation for sentencing was not constitutionally adequate. Further, the admission into evidence of statements from a psychiatric report based on an uncounseled interview with the defendant does not violate the Fifth Amendment protection against self-incrimination.
Norfolk Shipbuilding & Drydock Corp. v. Garris	532 U.S. 811	2001
There is a cause of action for negligence under maritime law; the negligent breach of general maritime duty of care was actionable when it caused death.
United Dominion Industries, Inc. v. United States	532 U.S. 822	2001
An affiliated group's product liability loss must be figured on a consolidated, single-entity basis; a conglomerate cannot aggregate the product liability loss of its subsidiaries and report that sum as its product liability loss.
Pollard v. E. I. du Pont de Nemours & Co.	532 U.S. 843	June 4, 2001
Front pay is not an element of compensatory damages under the Civil Rights Act of 1991 and thus is not subject to the damages cap imposed by the Act.
