= Florida v. Thomas =

- Supreme Court of the United States

Argued April 25, 2001 Decided June 4, 2001
- Full case name: Florida, Petitioner v. Robert A. Thomas, Respondent.
- Citations: 532 U.S. 774 (more) 121 S. Ct. 1905; 150 L. Ed. 2d 1

Case history
- Prior: Evidence suppressed during trial; suppression reversed, 711 So.2d 1241 (Fla. 2d DCA, 1998); reversed, 761 So.2d 1010 (Fla., 2000)

Holding
- The writ of certiorari was improvidently granted as the Florida state courts have not made a 'reviewable final-judgement'.

Court membership
- Chief Justice William Rehnquist Associate Justices John P. Stevens · Sandra Day O'Connor; Antonin Scalia · Anthony Kennedy; David Souter · Clarence Thomas; Ruth Bader Ginsburg · Stephen Breyer

Case opinion
- Majority: Rehnquist, joined by unanimous

Laws applied
- Ruling based on precedent

Florida v. Thomas, 532 U.S. 774 (2001), is a United States Supreme Court case decided in 2001. The case brought to the court concerned the extent of the Court's earlier decision in New York v. Belton, concerning whether a person was in custody, a determination central to allowing evidence seized in an automobile search to be presented in trial. However, the Court unanimously dismissed the case because the decision of the Florida state courts was not "final".

== Background ==
In Polk County, Florida, police officers went to Robert Thomas' home, investigating possible marijuana sales at his Florida home. While this was going on, Thomas drove up to his house in his car. An officer asked him for his name and identification. Thomas was arrested thereafter when a search on his license showed an outstanding warrant. One officer proceeded to take him inside the house while another searched his car, finding methamphetamine. He was indicted for possession. At his trial, he moved to suppress the evidence, which was subsequently granted by the trial judge. In reversing, an intermediate appellate court found the search valid under New York v. Belton. In Belton, the U.S. Supreme Court established a "bright-line" rule permitting an officer who has made a lawful custodial arrest of a car's occupant to search the car's passenger compartment as an incident of the arrest. In reversing the intermediate court of appeals, the Florida Supreme Court held Belton did not apply because it is limited to situations where the officer initiates contact with a vehicle's occupant while that person remains in the vehicle. The Supreme Court granted review. It would only be a few months before the ultimate decision, where they would dismiss the case.

== Opinion of the Court ==
In a unanimous opinion authored by Chief Justice William H. Rehnquist, the Court dismissed the writ of certiorari for want of jurisdiction. Rehnquist wrote that the Florida Supreme Court's decision did not fit any of the categories where the Court "treated state-court judgments as final for jurisdictional purposes although there were further proceedings to take place in the state court." Thus, the Court concluded that the Florida Supreme Court's decision was not final. This was partly based on a doctrine from the Cox decision which decided that certain decisions were not 'final' when the trial proceedings had not been completed.

== See also ==
- Certiorari
- Jurisdiction issues in American law
- Motor vehicle exception in Fourth Amendment Law
- Probable cause
- List of United States Supreme Court cases, volume 532
