= United Dominion Industries, Inc. v. United States =

- Supreme Court of the United States

Decided June 4, 2001
- Full case name: United Dominion Industries, Inc. v. United States
- Citations: 532 U.S. 822 (more)

Holding
- An affiliated group's product liability loss must be figured on a consolidated, single-entity basis; a conglomerate cannot aggregate the product liability loss of its subsidiaries and report that sum as its product liability loss.

Court membership
- Chief Justice William Rehnquist Associate Justices John P. Stevens · Sandra Day O'Connor; Antonin Scalia · Anthony Kennedy; David Souter · Clarence Thomas; Ruth Bader Ginsburg · Stephen Breyer

Case opinions
- Majority: Souter, joined by Rehnquist, O'Connor, Scalia, Kennedy, Thomas, Ginsburg, Breyer
- Concurrence: Thomas
- Dissent: Stevens

Laws applied
- Internal Revenue Code of 1954

United Dominion Industries, Inc. v. United States, 532 U.S. 822 (2001), was a United States Supreme Court case in which the Court held that an affiliated group's product liability loss must be figured on a consolidated, single-entity basis; a conglomerate cannot aggregate the product liability loss of its subsidiaries and report that sum as its product liability loss.
