= Atwater v. City of Lago Vista =

- Supreme Court of the United States

Argued December 4, 2000 Decided April 24, 2001
- Full case name: Gail Atwater, et al., Petitioners v. City of Lago Vista, et al.
- Citations: 532 U.S. 318 (more) 121 S. Ct. 1536; 149 L. Ed. 2d 549; 2001 U.S. LEXIS 3366; 69 U.S.L.W. 4262; 2001 Cal. Daily Op. Service 3203; 2001 Daily Journal DAR 3953; 2001 Colo. J. C.A.R. 2069; 14 Fla. L. Weekly Fed. S 193

Case history
- Prior: United States District Court for the Western District of Texas ruled for the City; reversed, 165 F.3d 380 (5th Cir. 1999); vacated, 171 F.3d 258 (5th Cir. 1999); District Court ruling affirmed by en banc court, 195 F.3d 242 (5th Cir. 1999); cert. granted, 530 U.S. 1260 (2000).

Court membership
- Chief Justice William Rehnquist Associate Justices John P. Stevens · Sandra Day O'Connor; Antonin Scalia · Anthony Kennedy; David Souter · Clarence Thomas; Ruth Bader Ginsburg · Stephen Breyer

Case opinions
- Majority: Souter, joined by Rehnquist, Scalia, Kennedy, Thomas
- Dissent: O'Connor, joined by Stevens, Ginsburg, Breyer

Atwater v. Lago Vista, 532 U.S. 318 (2001), was a United States Supreme Court decision which held that a person's Fourth Amendment rights are not violated when the subject is arrested for driving without a seatbelt. The court ruled that such an arrest for a misdemeanor that is punishable only by a fine does not constitute an unreasonable seizure under the Fourth Amendment.

== Facts ==
Texas law provides for police officer discretion in arresting any person caught committing a misdemeanor, such as violating its mandatory seat belt laws. Violation of its seatbelt law in 1999 was punishable with the maximum fine of $50. In March 1997, Gail Atwater of Lago Vista, Texas was driving her pickup truck with her three-year-old son and five-year-old daughter inside. She allowed the children to unbuckle their seatbelts to search for a misplaced toy; hence, none of them were wearing their seatbelts. Lago Vista police officer Bart Turek recognized Atwater and stopped her. Atwater and her children remained in her truck when Turek approached the driver's side window and aggressively jabbed his finger toward her face. According to Atwater's complaint and witness testimony, Turek screamed at Atwater about the seatbelts, frightening her children. When Atwater requested that Turek lower his voice, he immediately yelled in response, "you’re going to jail." However, According to the record, Atwater remained calm and did not act suspiciously, did not pose any threat to Turek and did not engage in any illegal conduct other than failing to wear a seatbelt. Turek continued to verbally abuse Atwater, accusing her of not caring for her children.

After telling Atwater that she would be taken to jail, Turek demanded her driver's license and proof of insurance. When Atwater informed Turek that her purse containing her license and insurance card had recently been stolen, Turek told Atwater that he had "heard that story two hundred times." Atwater provided her address from her checkbook. Atwater then asked Turek to allow her to take her "frightened, upset, and crying" children to a friend's home located two houses away before taking her to jail, but he refused her request. Turek told her "[y]ou're not going anywhere" and stated that her children could accompany her to the police station. Atwater's friend arrived at the scene and took the children into her care while the officer arrested Atwater. Turek handcuffed Atwater in front of her children, placed her in his squad car, did not fasten her seatbelt and drove her to the police station to be booked and fingerprinted. According to the court document, "booking officers had her remove her shoes, jewelry, and eyeglasses, and empty her pockets. Officers took Atwater's 'mug shot' and placed her alone in a jail cell for about one hour." A magistrate released Atwater on $310 bond. She later paid three $50 fines for each violation of Texas's seat belt law, one for her and one for each of her children. The charges of driving without a license and without proof of insurance were dismissed.

Atwater and her husband Michael Haas, an emergency-room physician, filed suit under 42 U.S.C. § 1983, alleging that the city violated her Fourth Amendment right of freedom from unreasonable seizures by arresting her for an offense that was punishable with a simple monetary fine. The United States District Court for the Western District of Texas found summary judgment for the city. A panel of the Fifth Circuit reversed, holding that arresting a person for a fine-only misdemeanor was per se unreasonable. The Fifth Circuit, sitting en banc, reversed the panel, agreeing with the district court's reasoning. Three judges dissented from the en banc panel's ruling, arguing that the police should have had a specific reason for arresting Atwater for only violating the seatbelt law. The U.S. Supreme Court agreed to hear the case.

== Majority opinion ==
The court started by analyzing and rejecting Atwater's argument that the common law did not grant authority to police officers to execute warrantless arrests for misdemeanors that did not involve a breach of the peace. The court, recognizing the lack of unanimity of a common-law rule, found that the historical common law had a "decided, majority view that the police did not need to obtain an arrest warrant merely because a misdemeanor stopped short of violence or threat of it," and hence the argument had failed.

The majority conceded: "If we were to derive a rule exclusively to address the uncontested facts of this case, Atwater might well prevail." The majority also acknowledged specific directness in its opinion, "suggesting that courts look with 'disfavor' on such legislative enactments 'as interfering with the constitutional liberties of the subject'." Furthermore, the majority decision concluded that "warrantless misdemeanor arrests [may not] need constitutional attention," and that "[i]t is of course easier to devise a minor-offense limitation by statute than to derive one through the Constitution." Thus, the court rejected adopting a new constitutional-law rule by focusing on administrability concerns. It then held that probable cause was the issue and that the standard had been met.

== Analysis ==
The Supreme Court held that "Turek was authorized (though not required) to make a custodial arrest without balancing costs and benefits or determining whether Atwater's arrest was in some sense necessary." In Wilson v. Arkansas, 514 U.S. 927 (1995), the court had considered whether the Fourth Amendment required the police to knock first and announce their presence before entering a person's home. The court's analysis in the Atwater case proceeded along similar lines. Atwater claimed that the framers of the Fourth Amendment understood an "unreasonable" seizure to include a warrantless arrest for a misdemeanor offense that was not a "breach of the peace." The court examined the historical evidence of practice in England during the Middle Ages and in the 17th and 18th centuries and in the U.S. since the time of the ratification of the Bill of Rights. Though the court did find some evidence favoring Atwater's position, it determined that much of the historical precedent contradicted her argument. The Court's common-law analysis found that a police officer could arrest any person for a misdemeanor committed in his or her presence.

Atwater had urged the court to adopt a "bright-line" rule that the police not arrest anyone for an offense that did not carry jail time unless the government could show a compelling need to detain the person. The court conceded that although this rule appeared easily administrable by police officers and would serve the government's interest in enacting rules that are easily applicable, the many possible applications of the rule would complicate the matter. The court found it is unreasonable to expect an average police officer to know the details of "frequently complex penalty schemes," especially since the penalty resulting from a specific incident often rests on highly variable facts that are difficult to discern at the scene of a crime, such as the suspect's criminal history. Furthermore, even if an officer could make that distinction on the spot, he could not know how prosecutors would later elect to charge the offender.

The court held that as police routinely exercise discretion in their work, requiring them to decide in the heat of the moment whether an offense is a fine-only crime for which an arrest is unwarranted ultimately exposes the police to greater legal consequences: either the exclusion of illegally obtained evidence or personal liability for violating the suspect's constitutional rights. The court noted that balancing of Fourth Amendment interests through "probable cause" and "extraordinary" circumstances had been delineated in Terry v. Ohio, 392 U.S. 1 (1968). Given the choice to abandon or abridge the requirement of probable cause for arrest in the case of fine-only misdemeanors, the court ruled that the Fourth Amendment imposed the same standard for all crimes: probable cause.

The court's decision ultimately involved the extent of law-enforcement discretion in exercising their duties. After asking in oral argument, "how bad the problem is out there?," the court admonished Atwater's counsel's failure to provide it with "indications of comparably foolish, warrantless misdemeanor arrests." The majority opinion ultimately emphasized a specific view that "[m]ultiplied many times over, the costs to society of such underenforcement could easily outweigh the costs to defendants of being needlessly arrested and booked."

== Dissenting opinion ==
Justice O'Connor, presenting the dissenting opinion, stated that the historical evidence was not uniform in rejecting Atwater's proposed rule and reasoned that the Fourth Amendment required a balancing of interests in the case of an arrest for a fine-only misdemeanor. The court dissent in Atwater precluded the sole use of probable cause in Whren v. United States, 517 U.S. 806 (1996), in which the Court had held that, on balance, it was reasonable to allow the police to effect a traffic stop whenever they suspected a violation of the traffic laws, although a traffic stop was a seizure. But, because of the short duration of the typical traffic stop and the fact that most drivers are free to leave after it is concluded, such a seizure was commensurate with the magnitude of the violation and sufficient to ensure that the offender would appear later in court if necessary. The dissent argued that "probable cause" and "extraordinary" circumstances were defined without problem in cases such as Terry v. Ohio and Whren v. United States and that Atwater could not have been characterized as a possible flight risk by the arresting officer as she was known to him and was an established member of the community. Additionally, the government failed to substantiate any demonstrable merit for the arrest decision. The dissenting justices further noted that an arrest for a fine-only misdemeanor is unreasonable because incarcerating an offender for as long as 48 hours (the maximum duration for a magistrate to release the person) is too great an intrusion upon the liberty of one who has committed a relatively minor offense that would merit only a fine as its punishment.

The Atwater dissenting court opinion states: "A broad range of conduct falls into the category of fine-only misdemeanors... Such unbounded discretion [given to law enforcement] carries with it grave potential for abuse. The majority takes comfort in the lack of evidence of ‘an epidemic of unnecessary minor-offense arrests’." Reasoning beyond the case of a misdemeanor arrest for a seatbelt-law violation, Justice O'Connor’s dissenting court opinion further cautions: "The Court’s error, however, does not merely affect disposition of this case. The per se rule that the Court creates has potentially serious consequences for the everyday lives of Americans." O'Connor concluded the minority's dissent by stating: "The Court neglects the Fourth Amendment’s express command in the name of administrative ease. In so doing, it cloaks the pointless indignity that Gail Atwater (and her children) suffered with the mantle of reasonableness."

== Relation with search incident arrest ==
Along with the power to effect a custodial arrest for any misdemeanor traffic offense, officers have the constitutional authority to perform a suspicionless search of any person incident to a custodial arrest.

However, the potential for a warrantless search of a vehicle incident to such misdemeanor arrests—combining the holdings of Atwater and New York v. Belton—has since been limited by Arizona v. Gant. Gant limited searches incident to arrest to circumstances in which it is reasonable to believe that the arrested individual might access the vehicle at the time of the search or that the arrestee's vehicle contains evidence of the offense that led to the arrest. The court suggested in dictum that "when a recent occupant is arrested for a traffic violation, there will be no reasonable basis to believe the vehicle contains relevant evidence."

== See also ==
- List of United States Supreme Court cases, volume 532
- List of United States Supreme Court cases
