= List of United States Supreme Court cases, volume 501 =

This is a list of all United States Supreme Court cases from volume 501 of the United States Reports:

Case name	Citation	Date decided
Connecticut v. Doehr	501 U.S. 1	1991
Chambers v. NASCO, Inc.	501 U.S. 32	1991
Johnson v. Home State Bank	501 U.S. 78	1991
Melkonyan v. Sullivan	501 U.S. 89	1991
Astoria Fed. Sav. & Loan Ass'n v. Solimino	501 U.S. 104	1991
Gollust v. Mendell	501 U.S. 115	1991
Burns v. United States	501 U.S. 129	1991
Toibb v. Radloff	501 U.S. 157	1991
McNeil v. Wisconsin	501 U.S. 171	1991
Litton Business Systems, Inc. v. NLRB	501 U.S. 190	1991
Oklahoma v. New Mexico	501 U.S. 221	1991
Metro. Wash. Airports Auth. v. Citizens for Abatement of Aircraft Noise, Inc.	501 U.S. 252	1991
Wilson v. Seiter	501 U.S. 294	1991
Renne v. Geary	501 U.S. 312	1991
Lampf, Pleva, Lipkind, Prupis & Petigrow v. Gilbertson	501 U.S. 350	1991
Chisom v. Roemer	501 U.S. 380	1991
Houston Lawyers' Ass'n v. Attorney Gen.	501 U.S. 419	1991
Florida v. Bostick	501 U.S. 429	1991
Gregory v. Ashcroft	501 U.S. 452	1991
Masson v. New Yorker Magazine, Inc.	501 U.S. 496	1991
James B. Beam Distilling Co. v. Georgia	501 U.S. 529	1991
Barnes v. Glen Theatre, Inc.	501 U.S. 560	1991
Wisconsin Pub. Intervenor v. Mortier	501 U.S. 597	1991
Schad v. Arizona	501 U.S. 624	1991
Cohen v. Cowles Media Co.	501 U.S. 663	1991
Pauley v. BethEnergy Mines, Inc.	501 U.S. 680	1991
Coleman v. Thompson	501 U.S. 722	1991
Blatchford v. Native Village of Noatak	501 U.S. 775	1991
Ylst v. Nunnemaker	501 U.S. 797	1991
Payne v. Tennessee	501 U.S. 808	1991
Freytag v. Commissioner	501 U.S. 868	1991
Peretz v. United States	501 U.S. 923	1991
Harmelin v. Michigan	501 U.S. 957	1991
Gentile v. State Bar of Nevada	501 U.S. 1030	1991
Virginia Bankshares, Inc. v. Sandberg	501 U.S. 1083	1991
