= Becker v. Montgomery =

Supreme Court case; procedural issue, FRCP 11

- Supreme Court of the United States

Argued April 16, 2001 Decided May 29, 2001
- Full case name: Dale G. BECKER, Petitioner, Betty MONTGOMERY, Attorney General of Ohio, et al.
- Docket no.: 00–6374
- Citations: 532 U.S. 757 (more) 121 S.Ct. 1801; 149 L.Ed.2d 983
- Argument: Oral argument
- Reargument: Reargument
- Opinion announcement: Opinion announcement

Holding
- The Federal Rules requiring a notice of appeal to be signed derives from Rule 11(a), and so does the remedy for a signature's omission; the Sixth Circuit should have accepted Becker's corrected notice.

Court membership
- Chief Justice William Rehnquist Associate Justices John P. Stevens · Sandra Day O'Connor; Antonin Scalia · Anthony Kennedy; David Souter · Clarence Thomas; Ruth Bader Ginsburg · Stephen Breyer

Laws applied
- Rule 11(a) of the Federal Rules of Civil Procedure

Becker v. Montgomery, 532 U.S. 757 (2001) is a Supreme Court case that addressed Rule 11(a) of the Federal Rules of Civil Procedure and whether the failure to sign a notice of appeal requires a court to dismiss the appeal.

== Facts ==
Dale G. Becker, an Ohio prisoner, represented himself in a civil rights action to contest the conditions of his confinement. The United States District Court for the Southern District of Ohio dismissed Becker's complaint. Becker appealed, and filed his notice of appeal using a government-printed form. Where the form asked for "Counsel for Appellant" Becker typed his name but did not provide his signature. The District Court granted Becker leave to proceed in forma pauperis on appeal, but the Sixth Circuit Court of Appeals dismissed the appeal on its own motion, holding that the notice of appeal was fatally defective for lack of a signature, which the Court of Appeals deemed a 'jurisdictional' defect.

== Opinion ==
In a unanimous opinion delivered by Justice Ginsburg, the Court held that the federal rules require signature on notice of appeal, but the failure of a party to sign timely notice of appeal did not require the Court of Appeals to dismiss, as the lapse was curable and not a jurisdictional impediment. The only rule of civil procedure requiring that all papers filed in the district court be signed is Rule 11(a), which requires the signing of notices of appeal; a signature requirement is not among the specifications for notices of appeal set forth in the appellate court rules. Rule 11(a) states that the omission of a signature may be corrected within 30 days of filing. Since Becker was never given the opportunity to correct the omission before the Sixth Circuit dismissed his appeal, the Court reversed the dismissal. This was Justice Ginsburg's first majority opinion to cite an internet source.
