= Lackawanna County District Attorney v. Coss =

- Supreme Court of the United States

Argued February 20, 2001 Decided April 25, 2001
- Full case name: Lackawanna County District Attorney, et al., Petitioners v. Edward R. Coss, Jr.
- Citations: 532 U.S. 394 (more) 121 S. Ct. 1567; 149 L. Ed. 2d 608

Case history
- Prior: Defendant convicted sub. nom. Commonwealth v. Coss, 695 A.2d 831 (Pa. Super. Ct. 1997); petition for habeas relief denied, n°94-cv-01481 (M.D. Pa.); reversed and remanded, 204 F.3d 453 (3rd Cir. 2000); cert. granted, 531 U.S. 923 (2000).

Holding
- Habeas relief is unavailable to state prisoners who challenge a sentence on the ground that it was enhanced on an unconstitutional prior conviction.

Court membership
- Chief Justice William Rehnquist Associate Justices John P. Stevens · Sandra Day O'Connor; Antonin Scalia · Anthony Kennedy; David Souter · Clarence Thomas; Ruth Bader Ginsburg · Stephen Breyer

Case opinions
- Majority: O'Connor, joined by Rehnquist, Kennedy; Scalia (all but Parts III–B & III–C); Thomas (all but Part III–B)
- Dissent: Souter, joined by Stevens, Ginsburg
- Dissent: Breyer

Laws applied
- 28 U.S.C. § 2254

Lackawanna County District Attorney v. Coss, 532 U.S. 394 (2001), was a United States Supreme Court case. The case concerned a federal prisoner who sought to challenge his current sentence by arguing it was enhanced based on an unconstitutional prior conviction. A divided Court held that such challenges could not be brought. The decision was based on a reading of the statute in question, not a Sixth Amendment constitutional analysis.

== Background ==
Edward R. Coss, Jr., had an extensive criminal record. By the age of 16 he had been "adjudged a juvenile delinquent on five separate occasions". In October 1986, Coss was convicted in Pennsylvania state court of assault, vandalism, and criminal mischief. He was sentenced to two consecutive prison terms of six months to one year. A habeas challenge, based on a claim that his trial attorney was constitutionally ineffective, was never ruled on by state courts.

After serving these sentences, he was convicted of aggravated assault in 1990. The court enhanced his sentence based on the prior conviction. A new habeas action against this trial was based on an argument that the enhancement relied on an unconstitutional prior conviction. Both the federal district court and the Third Circuit Court of Appeals determined that the enhancement was not permissible. The state prosecutors petitioned the United States Supreme Court to hear an appeal through a writ of certiorari.

== Opinion of the Court ==
Justice Sandra Day O'Connor wrote the majority opinion of the Court which reversed the decision of the Third Circuit. As the basis for the habeas challenge was Title 28, Section §2254 of the United States Code, each element of that section had to be fulfilled in order to gain relief (a reduction in sentence). The first element was that the petitioner is "in custody pursuant to the judgment of a state court", a status that Coss could not fulfill as he was not serving his 1986 sentences any longer. Additionally, the claim was not properly raised because the original sentence was "no longer open to attack".

Other parts of the majority opinion regarding Sixth Amendment claims did not control a majority of the Court, thus the judgment of the Third Circuit was simply reversed.

=== Dissenting opinions ===
==== Souter's dissent ====
Justice Souter wrote a dissent which was joined by Justices Ginsburg and Stevens. Souter argued that because there was never a decision on the constitutionality of the original trial, the issue of "adverse effect" could still be raised.

==== Breyer's dissent ====
Another dissenting opinion in the case was authored by Justice Stephen Breyer. His short, one-paragraph opinion, argued that because the state has "failed to argue that the ... consideration of the 1986 convictions were harmless" there was no reason to overturn the Third Circuit's findings. This was a different reason than the Souter dissent, which is why he did not join it.

== See also ==
- Habeas corpus
- Daniels v. United States (2001)
