= Lujan v. G & G Fire Sprinklers, Inc. =

- Supreme Court of the United States

Argued February 26, 2001 Decided April 17, 2001
- Full case name: Arthur S. Lujan, Labor Commissioner of California, et al., v. G & G Fire Sprinklers, Incorporated
- Citations: 532 U.S. 189 (more) 121 S. Ct. 1446; 149 L. Ed. 2d 391

Case history
- Prior: C.D. of CA grants summary judgement to Respondents, G & G Fire Sprinklers, Inc. v. Bradshaw, 156 F.3d 893, 898 (CA9 1998) (Bradshaw I), Ninth Circuit affirms C.D. of CA, rehearing after intervening Supreme Court case 204 F.3d, at 943
- Subsequent: Ninth Circuit Reversed, injunction vacated

Holding
- Even though there is no hearing under the state contractual scheme, because plaintiffs can bring claims in state court, there is no violation of due process.

Court membership
- Chief Justice William Rehnquist Associate Justices John P. Stevens · Sandra Day O'Connor; Antonin Scalia · Anthony Kennedy; David Souter · Clarence Thomas; Ruth Bader Ginsburg · Stephen Breyer

Case opinion
- Majority: Rehnquist, joined by unanimous

Laws applied
- U.S. Const. amends. VIX

Lujan v. G & G Fire Sprinklers, Inc., 532 U.S. 189 (2001), was a United States Supreme Court case decided in 2001. The case concerned a provision of the California Labor Code which allowed the state to withhold payment to contractors or subcontractors if found in breach of contract, without a specific hearing on the matter. The Court upheld the provision because the companies were still able to pursue a claim in state court.

== Opinion of the Court ==
Chief Justice Rehnquist delivered the unanimous Opinion of the Court, reversing the Ninth Circuit Court of Appeals which had ruled the contested labor code regulation unconstitutional. Rehnquist stated that the companies involved would still be able to have the contract dispute reviewed in state court, despite the fact that the immediate withholding of funds was without a hearing. In sum he reasoned, "[I]f California makes ordinary judicial process available to G & G for resolving its contractual dispute, that process is due process."

== See also ==
- INS v. Chadha
