= Daniels v. United States =

- Supreme Court of the United States

Argued January 8, 2001 Decided April 25, 2001
- Full case name: Daniels, Petitioner, v. United States, Respondent
- Citations: 532 U.S. 374 (more) 121 S. Ct. 1578; 149 L. Ed. 2d 590

Case history
- Prior: On Writ of Certiorari to the United States Court of Appeals for the Ninth Circuit

Holding
- A federal defendant, sentenced under the Armed Career Criminal Act of 1984, may not challenge his federal sentence through a motion that his prior convictions were unconstitutionally obtained.

Court membership
- Chief Justice William Rehnquist Associate Justices John P. Stevens · Sandra Day O'Connor; Antonin Scalia · Anthony Kennedy; David Souter · Clarence Thomas; Ruth Bader Ginsburg · Stephen Breyer

Case opinions
- Majority: O'Connor, joined by Rehnquist, Scalia, Kennedy, Thomas
- Concurrence: Scalia
- Dissent: Souter, joined by Stevens, Ginsburg
- Dissent: Breyer

Laws applied
- Armed Career Criminal Act

Daniels v. United States, 531 U.S. 374 (2001), was a decision by the Supreme Court of the United States involving the Armed Career Criminal Act. The Court ruled, in a 5–4 decision, that a defendant sentenced under that Act could not challenge previous convictions on appeal that were used to increase his new sentence.

== Background and lower court proceedings ==
In 1994, Earthy D. Daniels, Jr., was convicted of being a felon in possession of a firearm. Under the Armed Career Criminal Act of 1984, which imposes a mandatory minimum 15-year sentence on anyone convicted of being a felon in possession of a firearm and who has three previous convictions for a violent felony, Daniels' sentence was enhanced. After an unsuccessful appeal, Daniels filed a motion to vacate, set aside, or correct his federal sentence. Daniels argued that his sentence violated the Constitution because it was based in part on two prior convictions that were themselves unconstitutional. The District Court denied the motion. The Ninth Circuit Court of Appeals affirmed the decision, reasoning that they could only review those prior convictions if a Gideon violation was alleged. Daniels sought review in the Supreme Court, which agreed to hear the case.

== The Court's decision ==
In an opinion delivered by Justice Sandra Day O'Connor, the Supreme Court affirmed the lower courts' dismissal of Daniels' claim. The Court stated that the nonexistent or unsuccessful pursuit of available challenges to the constitutionality of prior state convictions, which were used to enhance a federal sentence, precluded such challenge to collaterally attack a federal sentence. "[Daniels] could have pursued his claims while he was in custody on those convictions," wrote Justice O'Connor for the majority. "As his counsel conceded at oral argument, there is no indication that [Daniels] did so or that he was prevented from doing so by some external force." Three other Justices agreed with the decision in full while Justice Antonin Scalia agreed with the understanding that Daniels, under different circumstances, could receive special review of prior convictions.

=== Dissent ===
Justice David H. Souter wrote a dissenting opinion, disagreeing with the majority's usage of the text of the Act in question. Justice Stephen Breyer also filed a dissent, writing that the silence of a Congressional statute to discuss the implications of an enhanced sentence would allow for challenges to that enhanced sentence.

== See also ==
- Criminal law
- Sixth Amendment to the United States Constitution
- Lackawanna County District Attorney v. Coss (2001)
