= Atkinson Trading Co. v. Shirley =

- Supreme Court of the United States

Argued March 27, 2001 Decided May 29, 2001
- Full case name: Atkinson Trading Co., Inc. v. Joe Shirley, Jr., et al.
- Docket no.: 00-454
- Citations: 532 U.S. 645 (more) 121 S. Ct. 1825; 149 L. Ed. 2d 889

Case history
- Prior: Atkinson Trading Co. v. Shirley, 210 F.3d 1247 (10th Cir. 2000)

Holding
- The Navajo Nation's imposition of a hotel occupancy tax upon nonmembers on non-Indian fee land within its reservation is invalid

Court membership
- Chief Justice William Rehnquist Associate Justices John P. Stevens · Sandra Day O'Connor; Antonin Scalia · Anthony Kennedy; David Souter · Clarence Thomas; Ruth Bader Ginsburg · Stephen Breyer

Case opinion
- Majority: Rehnquist, joined by unanimous

Laws applied
- 25 U.S.C. § 261

Atkinson Trading Co. v. Shirley, 532 U.S. 645 (2001), was a United States Supreme Court case in which the Court held the Navajo Nation's imposition of a hotel occupancy tax upon nonmembers on non-Indian fee land within its reservation is invalid.

== Background ==
The Atkinson Trading Company, Inc. owns a hotel, restaurant, cafeteria, gallery, curio shop, retail store, and recreational vehicle facility, which are located on non-Indian fee land within the Navajo Nation Reservation. The tribe provided police, fire, and ambulance services for the area, including the hotel complex. In 1992, the Navajo Nation enacted an 8 percent hotel occupancy tax on hotel rooms located within the reservation. Atkinson sought a declaratory judgment that the tax was invalid under Montana v. United States.

Under Montana, Indian tribes lack civil authority over the conduct of non-Indians on non-Indian land which is located on a reservation. An exception to Montana is where the non-Indian had entered into a consensual relationship with the tribe. Here, the hotel complex was surrounded by the reservation and received numerous services from the tribe. The District Court granted summary judgment to the tribe and the Tenth Circuit Court of Appeals affirmed.

== Supreme Court ==
Chief Justice William Rehnquist delivered the opinion of a unanimous court. Rehnquist stated that while Indian tribes have unique attributes of sovereignty over both their members and their territory, they do not have civil authority past those limits, with minor exceptions. The tribe's imposition of a tax upon nonmembers on non-Indian fee land within the reservation was presumptively invalid without establishing that the tax was related to a consensual relationship with Atkinson.

== Subsequent developments ==
The decision appeared to defy established Indian law, and significantly affected the ability of a tribe to build a significant tax base. The ruling significantly affected the Navajo's revenue in a negative manner. Although they still provided services, tax revenue had dropped from $1,167,000 to $881,000 in 2001. The tribe now requires a consent to taxes clause in all contracts.
