= 2000 term United States Supreme Court opinions of Stephen Breyer =

The 2000 term of the Supreme Court of the United States began October 2, 2000, and concluded September 30, 2001. This was the seventh term of Associate Justice Stephen Breyer's tenure on the Court.
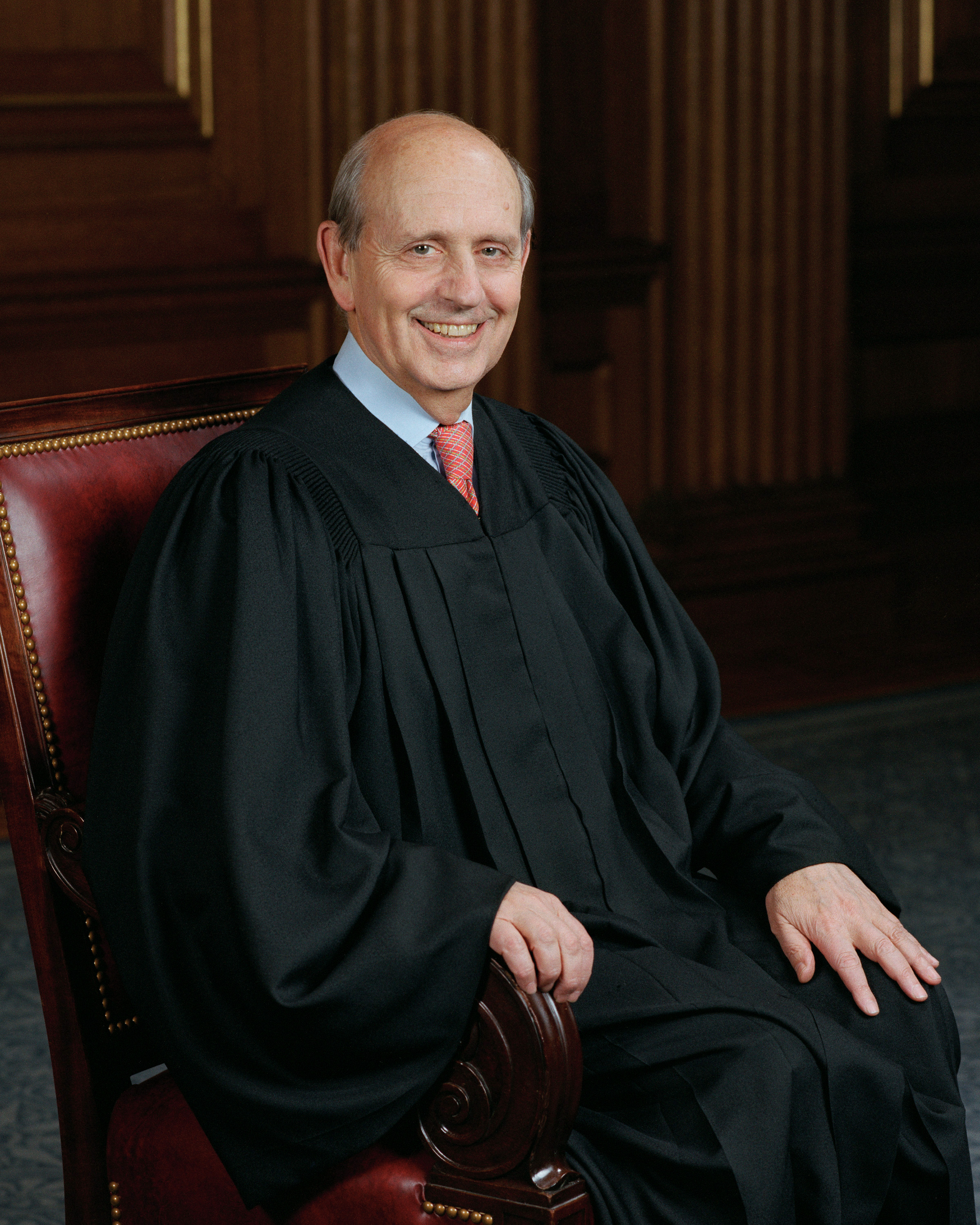

Stephen Breyer 2000 term statistics

9	Majority or plurality	3	Concurrence	1	Other
12	Dissent	0	Concurrence/dissent	Total =	25
Bench opinions = 24		Opinions relating to orders = 1		In-chambers opinions = 0
Unanimous opinions: 3		Most joined by: Ginsburg (15)		Least joined by: Thomas (5)

Type	Case	Citation	Issues	Joined by	Other opinions
	Eastern Associated Coal Corp. v. Mine Workers	531 U.S. 57 (2000)		Rehnquist, Stevens, O'Connor, Kennedy, Souter, Ginsburg	
	Bush v. Gore	531 U.S. 98 (2000)		Stevens, Souter, Ginsburg (in part)	
	Gitlitz v. Commissioner	531 U.S. 206 (2000)			
	Illinois v. McArthur	531 U.S. 326 (2001)		Rehnquist, O'Connor, Scalia, Kennedy, Souter, Thomas, Ginsburg	
	Board of Trustees of the University of Alabama v. Garrett	531 U.S. 356 (2001)		Stevens, Souter, Ginsburg	
	Whitman v. American Trucking Assns., Inc.	531 U.S. 457 (2001)			
	Buford v. United States	532 U.S. 59 (2001)		Unanimous	
	Egelhoff v. Egelhoff	532 U.S. 141 (2001)		Stevens	
	Texas v. Cobb	532 U.S. 162 (2001)		Stevens, Souter, Ginsburg	
	Easley v. Cromartie	532 U.S. 234 (2001)		Stevens, O'Connor, Souter, Ginsburg	
	Daniels v. United States	532 U.S. 374 (2001)			
	Lackawanna County District Attorney v. Coss	532 U.S. 394 (2001)			
	Rogers v. Tennessee	532 U.S. 451 (2001)			
	Bartnicki v. Vopper	532 U.S. 514 (2001)		O'Connor	
	United States v. Hatter	532 U.S. 557 (2001)		Rehnquist, Kennedy, Souter, Ginsburg; Scalia (in part)	
	Wharf (Holdings) Ltd. v. United Int'l Holdings, Inc.	532 U.S. 588 (2001)		Unanimous	
	Bridgers v. Texas	532 U.S. 1034 (2001)		Stevens, Souter	
Breyer filed a statement respecting the Court's denial of certiorari.
	Good News Club v. Milford Central School	533 U.S. 98 (2001)			
	Alabama v. Bozeman	533 U.S. 146 (2001)		Rehnquist, Stevens, O'Connor, Kennedy, Souter, Ginsburg; Scalia, Thomas (in part)	
	Cedric Kushner Promotions, Ltd. v. King	533 U.S. 158 (2001)		Unanimous	
	Duncan v. Walker	533 U.S. 167 (2001)		Ginsburg	
	United States v. United Foods, Inc.	533 U.S. 405 (2001)		Ginsburg; O'Connor (in part)	
	Palazzolo v. Rhode Island	533 U.S. 606 (2001)			
	Tyler v. Cain	533 U.S. 656 (2001)		Stevens, Souter, Ginsburg	
	Zadvydas v. Davis	533 U.S. 678 (2001)		Stevens, O'Connor, Souter, Ginsburg	
