= 2000 term United States Supreme Court opinions of Sandra Day O'Connor =

The 2000 term of the Supreme Court of the United States began October 2, 2000, and concluded September 30, 2001. This was the twentieth term of Associate Justice Sandra Day O'Connor's tenure on the Court.
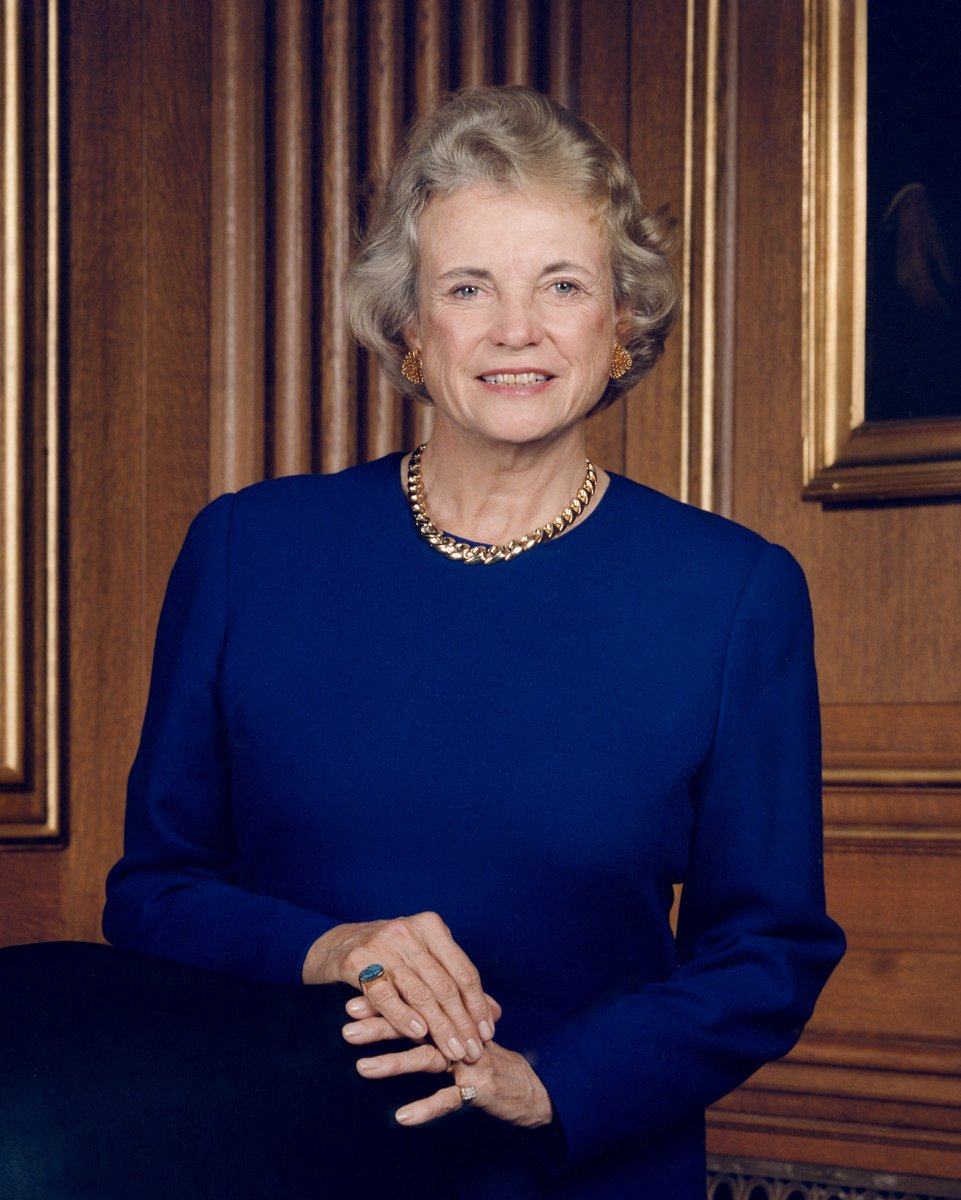

Sandra Day O'Connor 2000 term statistics

9	Majority or plurality	3	Concurrence	0	Other
5	Dissent	1	Concurrence/dissent	Total =	18
Bench opinions = 17		Opinions relating to orders = 1		In-chambers opinions = 0
Unanimous opinions: 1		Most joined by: Rehnquist, Kennedy (9)		Least joined by: Stevens (5)

Type	Case	Citation	Issues	Joined by	Other opinions
	Indianapolis v. Edmond	531 U.S. 32 (2000)		Stevens, Kennedy, Souter, Ginsburg, Breyer	
	Seling v. Young	531 U.S. 250 (2001)		Rehnquist, Scalia, Kennedy, Thomas, Ginsburg, Breyer	
	Lewis v. Lewis & Clark Marine, Inc.	531 U.S. 438 (2001)		Unanimous	
	Northwest Airlines, Inc. v. Duncan	531 U.S. 1058 (2000)		Rehnquist, Thomas	
O'Connor dissented from the Court's denial of certiorari.
	Atwater v. Lago Vista	532 U.S. 318 (2001)		Stevens, Ginsburg, Breyer	
	Daniels v. United States	532 U.S. 374 (2001)		Rehnquist, Kennedy, Thomas; Scalia (in part)	
	Lackawanna County District Attorney v. Coss	532 U.S. 394 (2001)		Rehnquist, Kennedy, Thomas; Scalia (in part)	
	Rogers v. Tennessee	532 U.S. 451 (2001)		Rehnquist, Kennedy, Souter, Ginsburg	
	Penry v. Johnson	532 U.S. 782 (2001)		Stevens, Kennedy, Souter, Ginsburg, Breyer; Rehnquist, Scalia, Thomas (in part)	
	Kansas v. Colorado	533 U.S. 1 (2001)		Scalia, Thomas	
	Tuan Anh Nguyen v. INS	533 U.S. 53 (2001)		Souter, Ginsburg, Breyer	
	Duncan v. Walker	533 U.S. 167 (2001)		Rehnquist, Scalia, Kennedy, Souter, Thomas	
	INS v. St. Cyr	533 U.S. 289 (2001)			
	Calcano-Martinez v. INS	533 U.S. 348 (2001)			
	Nevada v. Hicks	533 U.S. 353 (2001)		Stevens, Breyer	
	Lorillard Tobacco Co. v. Reilly	533 U.S. 525 (2001)		Rehnquist; Stevens, Scalia, Kennedy, Souter, Thomas, Ginsburg, Breyer (in part)	
	Palazzolo v. Rhode Island	533 U.S. 606 (2001)			
	Tyler v. Cain	533 U.S. 656 (2001)			
