= 2000 term United States Supreme Court opinions of Clarence Thomas =

The 2000 term of the Supreme Court of the United States began October 2, 2000, and concluded September 30, 2001. This was the tenth term of Associate Justice Clarence Thomas's tenure on the Court.
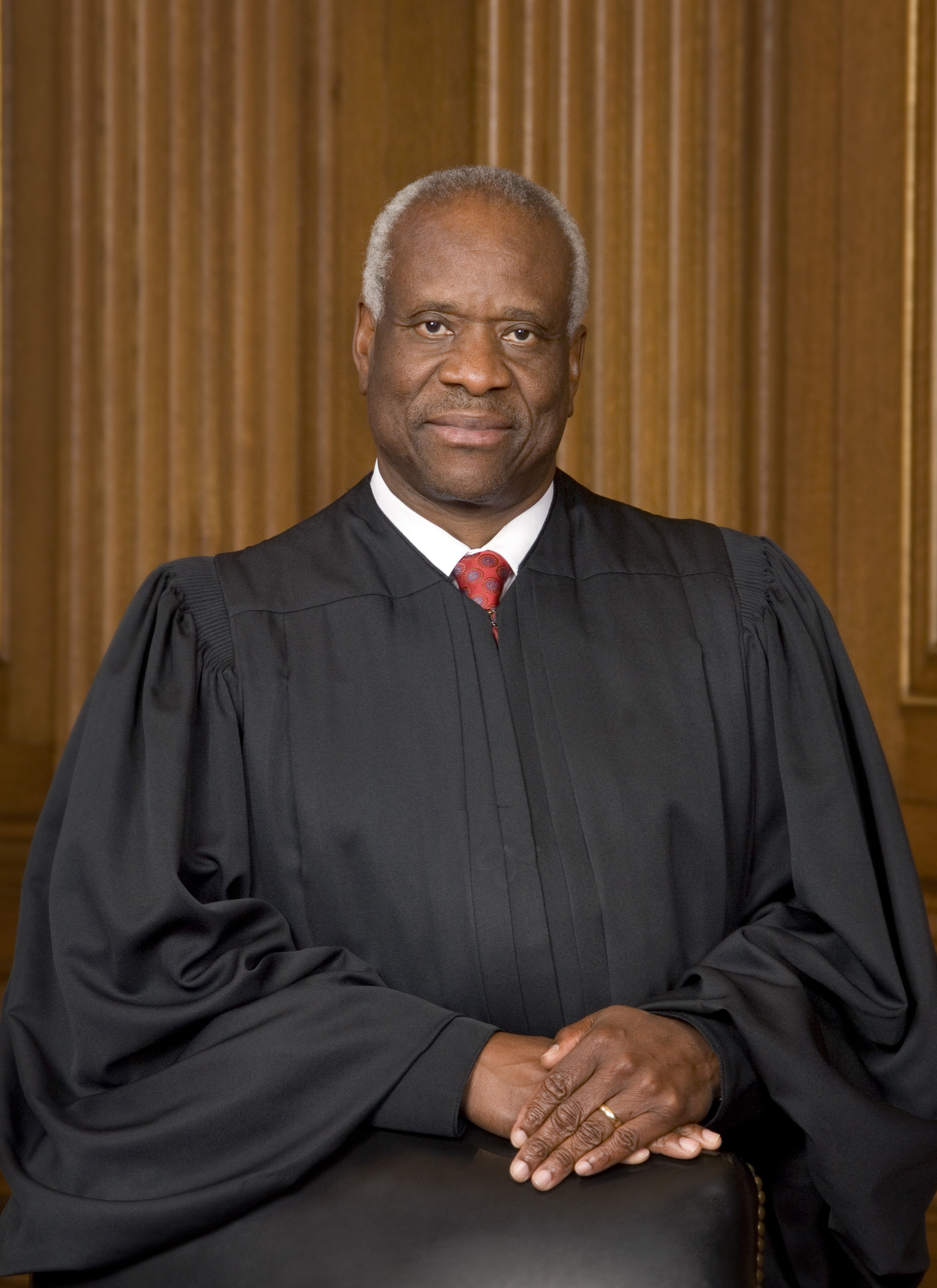

Clarence Thomas 2000 term statistics

7	Majority or plurality	7	Concurrence	0	Other
7	Dissent	2	Concurrence/dissent	Total =	23
Bench opinions = 21		Opinions relating to orders = 2		In-chambers opinions = 0
Unanimous opinions: 2		Most joined by: Scalia (13)		Least joined by: Stevens (1)

Type	Case	Citation	Issues	Joined by	Other opinions
	Indianapolis v. Edmond	531 U.S. 32 (2000)			
	Seling v. Young	531 U.S. 250 (2001)			
	Brentwood Academy v. Tennessee Secondary School Athletic Assn.	531 U.S. 288 (2001)		Rehnquist, Scalia, Kennedy	
	Director of Revenue of Mo. v. CoBank ACB	531 U.S. 288 (2001)		Unanimous	
	Whitman v. American Trucking Assns., Inc.	531 U.S. 457 (2001)			
	Cook v. Gralike	531 U.S. 510 (2001)			
	Michaels v. McGrath	531 U.S. 1118 (2001)			
Thomas dissented from the Court's denial of certiorari.
	Shafer v. South Carolina	532 U.S. 36 (2001)			
	Egelhoff v. Egelhoff	532 U.S. 141 (2001)		Rehnquist, O'Connor, Scalia, Kennedy, Souter, Ginsburg	
	Shaw v. Murphy	532 U.S. 223 (2001)		Unanimous	
	Easley v. Cromartie	532 U.S. 234 (2001)		Rehnquist, Scalia, Kennedy	
	Cooper Industries, Inc. v. Leatherman Tool Group, Inc.	532 U.S. 424 (2001)			
	United States v. Oakland Cannabis Buyers' Cooperative	532 U.S. 483 (2001)		Rehnquist, O'Connor, Scalia, Kennedy	
	United States v. Hatter	532 U.S. 557 (2001)			
	Penry v. Johnson	532 U.S. 782 (2001)		Rehnquist, Scalia	
	United Dominion Industries, Inc. v. United States	532 U.S. 822 (2001)			
	Pollard v. E. I. DuPont de Nemours & Co.	532 U.S. 843 (2001)		Rehnquist, Stevens, Scalia, Kennedy, Souter, Ginsburg, Breyer	
	Chen v. Houston	532 U.S. 1046 (2001)		Thomas dissented from the Court's denial of certiorari.	
	Good News Club v. Milford Central School	533 U.S. 98 (2001)		Rehnquist, O'Connor, Scalia, Kennedy; Breyer (in part)	
	United States v. United Foods, Inc.	533 U.S. 405 (2001)			
	Federal Election Comm'n v. Colorado Republican Federal Campaign Comm.	533 U.S. 431 (2001)		Scalia, Kennedy; Rehnquist (in part)	
	Lorillard Tobacco Co. v. Reilly	533 U.S. 525 (2001)			
	Tyler v. Cain	533 U.S. 656 (2001)		Rehnquist, O'Connor, Scalia, Kennedy	
