= Evans v. Gore =

- Supreme Court of the United States

Decided June 1, 1920
- Full case name: Evans v. Gore, Deputy and Acting Collector of Internal Revenue for the Western District of Kentucky
- Citations: 253 U.S. 245 (more)

Holding
- A federal judge's salary cannot be decreased by federal income taxes implemented after the judge's appointment.

Court membership
- Chief Justice Edward D. White Associate Justices Joseph McKenna · Oliver W. Holmes Jr. William R. Day · Willis Van Devanter; Mahlon Pitney · James C. McReynolds; Louis Brandeis · John H. Clarke

Case opinions
- Majority: Van Devanter, joined by White, McKenna, Day, Pitney, McReynolds, Clarke
- Dissent: Holmes, joined by Brandeis

Laws applied
- Compensation Clause

Evans v. Gore, 253 U.S. 245 (1920), was a United States Supreme Court case in which the court held that a federal judge's salary cannot be decreased by federal income taxes implemented after the judge's appointment.

== Background ==
Walter Evans was the United States District Judge for the Western District of Kentucky, and held that office under an appointment by President William McKinley made in 1899 with the advice and consent of the Senate. Evans challenged an income tax levied under the act of February 24, 1919, (Note: c. 18, 40 Stat. 1062) on his earnings during 1918. His compensation or salary as district judge was included in the computation. Had it been excluded, he would not have paid any income tax for that year. The inclusion was due to a provision in § 213 requiring the computation to embrace all gains, profits, income and the like,

including in the case of the President of the United States, the judges of the Supreme and inferior courts of the United States [and others] . . . the compensation received as such.

Evans lost in federal district court. Evans appealed the case to the Supreme Court.

== Opinion of the court ==
The Supreme Court issued an opinion on June 1, 1920.

== Later developments ==
The court formally overruled Evans in the 2001 case United States v. Hatter. The Hatter court reaffirmed the principle that judges should "share the tax burdens borne by all citizens," holding that "the potential threats to judicial independence that underlie [the Compensation Clause] cannot justify a special judicial exemption from a commonly shared tax." The court ruled that a Medicare tax, which was extended to all federal employees in 1982, was a non-discriminatory tax that could be applied to federal judges. By contrast, the court ruled that the 1983 extension of a Social Security tax to then-sitting judges violated the Compensation Clause, because judges were required to participate while almost all other federal employees were given a choice about participation. Nor had Congress cured the constitutional violation by a subsequent enactment that raised judges' salaries by an amount greater than the amount of Social Security taxes that they were required to pay.
