= List of United States Supreme Court cases, volume 253 =

Supreme Court of the United States
- Interactive map of Supreme Court of the United States
- 38°53′26″N 77°00′16″W
- Established: March 4, 1789; 236 years ago
- Location: Washington, D.C.
- Coordinates: 38°53′26″N 77°00′16″W
- Composition method: Presidential nomination with Senate confirmation
- Authorised by: Constitution of the United States, Art. III, § 1
- Judge term length: life tenure, subject to impeachment and removal
- Number of positions: 9 (by statute)
- Website: supremecourt.gov

This is a list of cases reported in volume 253 of United States Reports, decided by the Supreme Court of the United States in 1920.

== Justices of the Supreme Court at the time of volume 253 U.S. ==
The Supreme Court is established by Article III, Section 1 of the Constitution of the United States, which says: "The judicial Power of the United States, shall be vested in one supreme Court . . .". The size of the Court is not specified; the Constitution leaves it to Congress to set the number of justices. Under the Judiciary Act of 1789 Congress originally fixed the number of justices at six (one chief justice and five associate justices). Since 1789 Congress has varied the size of the Court from six to seven, nine, ten, and back to nine justices (always including one chief justice).

When the cases in volume 253 were decided the Court comprised the following nine members:

Portrait	Justice	Office	Home State	Succeeded	Date confirmed by the Senate (Vote)	Tenure on Supreme Court
	Edward Douglass White	Chief Justice	Louisiana	Melville Fuller	December 12, 1910 (Acclamation)	December 19, 1910 – May 19, 1921 (Died)
	Joseph McKenna	Associate Justice	California	Stephen Johnson Field	January 21, 1898 (Acclamation)	January 26, 1898 – January 5, 1925 (Retired)
	Oliver Wendell Holmes Jr.	Associate Justice	Massachusetts	Horace Gray	December 4, 1902 (Acclamation)	December 8, 1902 – January 12, 1932 (Retired)
	William R. Day	Associate Justice	Ohio	George Shiras Jr.	February 23, 1903 (Acclamation)	March 2, 1903 – November 13, 1922 (Retired)
	Willis Van Devanter	Associate Justice	Wyoming	Edward Douglass White (as Associate Justice)	December 15, 1910 (Acclamation)	January 3, 1911 – June 2, 1937 (Retired)
	Mahlon Pitney	Associate Justice	New Jersey	John Marshall Harlan	March 13, 1912 (50–26)	March 18, 1912 – December 31, 1922 (Resigned)
	James Clark McReynolds	Associate Justice	Tennessee	Horace Harmon Lurton	August 29, 1914 (44–6)	October 12, 1914 – January 31, 1941 (Retired)
	Louis Brandeis	Associate Justice	Massachusetts	Joseph Rucker Lamar	June 1, 1916 (47–22)	June 5, 1916 – February 13, 1939 (Retired)
	John Hessin Clarke	Associate Justice	Ohio	Charles Evans Hughes	July 24, 1916 (Acclamation)	October 9, 1916 – September 18, 1922 (Retired)

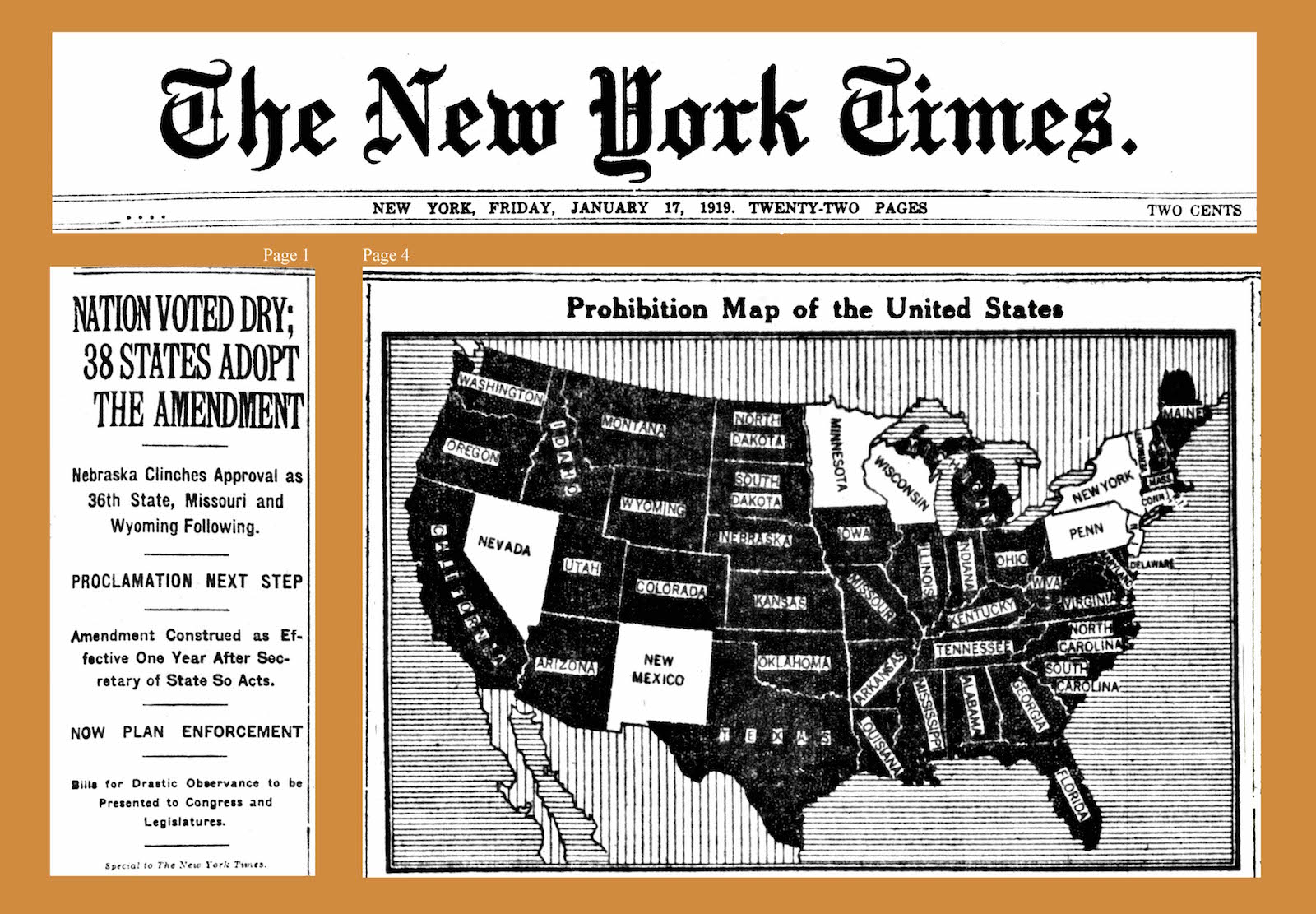
After the 36th state adopted the 18th Amendment on January 16, 1919, the U.S. Secretary of State had to issue a formal proclamation declaring its ratification.

== Notable Case in 253 U.S. ==
=== Hawke v. Smith ===
Hawke v. Smith, 253 U.S. 221 (1920), was a challenge to the constitutionality of a state referendum to overturn the Ohio legislature's vote to adopt the Eighteenth Amendment to the United States Constitution (the "Prohibition Amendment"). The Supreme Court held that while states may allow their legislatures' actions to be reversed through popular votes, that did not apply to the adoption of federal constitutional amendments since that power was granted to the legislatures by the United States Constitution, and the Constitution did not provide for any role to be played by the people in the consideration of amendments.

== Citation style ==
Under the Judiciary Act of 1789 the federal court structure at the time comprised District Courts, which had general trial jurisdiction; Circuit Courts, which had mixed trial and appellate (from the US District Courts) jurisdiction; and the United States Supreme Court, which had appellate jurisdiction over the federal District and Circuit courts—and for certain issues over state courts. The Supreme Court also had limited original jurisdiction (i.e., in which cases could be filed directly with the Supreme Court without first having been heard by a lower federal or state court). There were one or more federal District Courts and/or Circuit Courts in each state, territory, or other geographical region.

The Judiciary Act of 1891 created the United States Courts of Appeals and reassigned the jurisdiction of most routine appeals from the district and circuit courts to these appellate courts. The Act created nine new courts that were originally known as the "United States Circuit Courts of Appeals." The new courts had jurisdiction over most appeals of lower court decisions. The Supreme Court could review either legal issues that a court of appeals certified or decisions of court of appeals by writ of certiorari. On January 1, 1912, the effective date of the Judicial Code of 1911, the old Circuit Courts were abolished, with their remaining trial court jurisdiction transferred to the U.S. District Courts.

Bluebook citation style is used for case names, citations, and jurisdictions.

- "# Cir." = United States Court of Appeals
  - e.g., "3d Cir." = United States Court of Appeals for the Third Circuit
- "D." = United States District Court for the District of . . .
  - e.g.,"D. Mass." = United States District Court for the District of Massachusetts
- "E." = Eastern; "M." = Middle; "N." = Northern; "S." = Southern; "W." = Western
  - e.g.,"M.D. Ala." = United States District Court for the Middle District of Alabama
- "Ct. Cl." = United States Court of Claims
- The abbreviation of a state's name alone indicates the highest appellate court in that state's judiciary at the time.
  - e.g.,"Pa." = Supreme Court of Pennsylvania
  - e.g.,"Me." = Supreme Judicial Court of Maine

== List of cases in volume 253 U.S. ==
Case Name	Page and year	Opinion of the Court	Concurring opinion(s)	Dissenting opinion(s)	Lower Court	Disposition
United States v. Atlanta Dredging Company	1 (1920)	McKenna	none	none	Ct. Cl.	affirmed
Maguire v. Trefry	12 (1920)	Day	none	none	Mass. Super. Ct.	affirmed
Ward v. Love County	17 (1920)	VanDevanter	none	none	Oklahoma	reversed
Broadwell v. Carter County	25 (1920)	VanDevanter	none	none	Okla.	reversed
United States v. Reading Company	26 (1920)	Clarke	none	White	E.D. Pa.	multiple
Wallace v. Hines	66 (1920)	Holmes	none	none	D.N.D.	affirmed
Great Northern Railroad Company v. Cahill	71 (1920)	White	none	none	S.D.	reversed
Erie Railroad Company v. Collins	77 (1920)	McKenna	none	none	2d Cir.	affirmed
Erie Railroad Company v. Szary	86 (1920)	McKenna	none	none	2d Cir.	affirmed
White v. Chin Fong	90 (1920)	McKenna	none	none	9th Cir.	affirmed
Leary v. United States	94 (1920)	Holmes	none	none	4th Cir.	affirmed
Chicago, Milwaukee, St. Paul and Pacific Railroad Company v. McCaull-Dinsmore Company	97 (1920)	Holmes	none	none	8th Cir.	affirmed
Western Union Telegraph Company v. Brown	101 (1920)	Day	none	none	9th Cir.	reversed
United States v. Alaska Steamship Co.	113 (1920)	Day	none	none	S.D.N.Y.	reversed
Spiller v. Atchison, Topeka and Santa Fe Railway Company	117 (1920)	Pitney	none	none	8th Cir.	reversed
Meccano, Ltd. v. John Wanamaker, New York	136 (1920)	McReynolds	none	none	2d Cir.	affirmed
O'Connell v. United States	142 (1920)	McReynolds	none	none	N.D. Cal.	affirmed
Knickerbocker Ice Company v. Stewart	149 (1920)	McReynolds	none	Holmes	N.Y. Sup. Ct.	reversed
Calhoun v. Massie	170 (1920)	Brandeis	none	McReynolds	Va.	affirmed
Newman v. Moyers	182 (1920)	Brandeis	none	none	D.C. Cir.	multiple
Bliss Company v. United States	187 (1920)	Clarke	none	none	Ct. Cl.	affirmed
Piedmont Power and Light Company v. Town of Graham	193 (1920)	Clarke	none	none	W.D.N.C.	dismissed
United States v. MacMillan	195 (1920)	White	none	none	7th Cir.	affirmed
Fort Smith and Western Railroad Company v. Mills	206 (1920)	Holmes	none	none	W.D. Ark.	reversed
United States ex rel. Johnson v. Payne	209 (1920)	Holmes	none	none	D.C. Cir.	affirmed
Fidelity Title and Trust Company v. Dubois Electric Company	212 (1920)	Holmes	none	none	3d Cir.	reversed
LeCrone v. McAdoo	217 (1920)	Holmes	none	none	D.C. Cir.	dismissed
City of New York v. Consolidated Gas Company of New York	219 (1920)	Day	none	none	2d Cir.	reversed
Hawke v. Smith I	221 (1920)	Day	none	none	Ohio	reversed
Hawke v. Smith II	231 (1920)	Day	none	none	Ohio	reversed
Green v. Frazier	233 (1920)	Day	none	none	N.D.	affirmed
Scott v. Frazier	243 (1920)	Day	none	none	D.N.D.	reversed
Evans v. Gore	245 (1920)	VanDevanter	none	Holmes	W.D. Ky.	reversed
Weidhorn v. Levy	268 (1920)	Pitney	none	none	1st Cir.	reversed
United States v. Omaha Tribe	275 (1920)	Pitney	none	none	Ct. Cl.	multiple
Philadelphia and Reading Railroad Company v. Hancock	284 (1920)	McReynolds	none	none	Pa.	reversed
Ohio Valley Water Company v. Ben Avon Borough	287 (1920)	McReynolds	none	Brandeis	Pa.	reversed
Ex parte Peterson	300 (1920)	Brandeis	none	none	S.D.N.Y.	mandamus denied
Pennsylvania Railroad Company v. Kittanning Iron and Steel Manufacturing Company	319 (1920)	Brandeis	none	none	Pa.	reversed
Cream of Wheat Company v. Grand Forks County	325 (1920)	Brandeis	none	none	N.D.	affirmed
United States v. North American Transportation and Trading Company	330 (1920)	Brandeis	none	none	Ct. Cl.	affirmed
Stallings v. Splain	339 (1920)	Brandeis	none	none	D.C. Cir.	affirmed
Porto Rico (sic) Railway, Light and Power Company v. Mor	345 (1920)	Brandeis	none	none	1st Cir.	certification
National Prohibition Cases	350 (1920)	VanDevanter	White; McReynolds	McKenna; Clarke	multiple	various
Royster Guano Company v. Virginia	412 (1920)	Pitney	none	Brandeis	Va.	reversed
Federal Trade Commission v. Gratz	421 (1920)	McReynolds	none	Brandeis	2d Cir.	affirmed
Nadeau v. Union Pacific Railroad Company	442 (1920)	McReynolds	none	none	D. Kan.	affirmed
Beidler v. United States	447 (1920)	Clarke	none	none	Ct. Cl.	affirmed
Kwock Jan Fat v. White	454 (1920)	Clarke	none	none	9th Cir.	reversed
