= Hawke v. Smith =

- Supreme Court of the United States

Argued April 23, 1920 Decided June 1, 1920
- Full case name: Hawke v. Smith, Secretary of State of Ohio
- Citations: 253 U.S. 221 (more) 40 S. Ct. 495; 64 L. Ed. 871; 1920 U.S. LEXIS 1416; 10 A.L.R. 1504

Case history
- Prior: Error to the Supreme Court of the State of Ohio

Holding
- The ratification of the proposed Eighteenth Amendment by the Legislature of Ohio cannot be referred to the electors of the state; the Ohio Constitution, in permitting such a referendum, is inconsistent with the Constitution of the United States. Hawke v. Smith, No. 1, ante, 253 U.S. 221. 100 Ohio St. 540 reversed.

Court membership
- Chief Justice Edward D. White Associate Justices Joseph McKenna · Oliver W. Holmes Jr. William R. Day · Willis Van Devanter; Mahlon Pitney · James C. McReynolds; Louis Brandeis · John H. Clarke

Case opinion
- Majority: Day, joined by unanimous

Laws applied
- Article V

Hawke v. Smith, 253 U.S. 221 (1920), was a United States Supreme Court case coming out of the state of Ohio. It challenged the constitutionality of a provision in the state constitution allowing the state legislature's ratification of federal constitutional amendments to be challenged by a petition signed by six percent of Ohio voters. This would then bring the issue to referendum.

In the case of Ohio and the 18th Amendment, the legislature ratified the amendment and, before the ninety-day waiting period had passed, the Secretary of State, Robert Lansing, declared the 18th Amendment to be in effect. Meanwhile, a petition was signed by at least six percent of the voters and, in the ensuing referendum, a majority of Ohio voters voted against prohibition, seemingly invalidating the passage of the 18th Amendment. The controversy regarding this situation led to litigation.

The issue before the court was whether or not a state had a right to reserve to its people the right to review its legislature's ratification of federal amendments. The prohibitionists argued that the Constitution provided for the ratifying of federal amendments by state legislatures—it said nothing about the people's right to review such amendments. Opponents of this view argued that the Constitution did not say anything about what constituted a state legislature and it was up to each of the states to decide what constituted its legislature. Thus in the case of Ohio, the idea of "state legislature" came with the limit of not being able to ratify a federal amendment without review by the people of the state, and, thus, the amendment had not been ratified.

== Opinion of the Court ==
On June 1, 1920, the Court ruled that Ohio voters could not overturn the state legislature's approval of the Eighteenth Amendment.

== Significance ==
Hawke v. Smith was important for two reasons. First, several other states had been considering referendums on Prohibition. This case made it clear that the 18th Amendment was valid. Second, the fact that the amendment passed in Ohio despite a majority of voters voting against it fostered the idea that Prohibition was the work of powerful groups and not the people themselves.

== Bibliography ==
- Kyvig, David E. Repealing National Prohibition. 2nd ed. Kent, Ohio: The Kent State UP, 2000. Pages 14–16.
