= Ex parte Siebold =

- Supreme Court of the United States

Decided October 1, 1879
- Full case name: Ex parte Siebold
- Citations: 100 U.S. 371 (more)

Holding
- So long as the vesting is consistent with the separation of powers, Congress has discretion to vest the appointment of an inferior officer in the President, a Department Head, or a Court of Law.

Court membership
- Chief Justice Morrison Waite Associate Justices Nathan Clifford · Noah H. Swayne; Samuel F. Miller · Stephen J. Field; William Strong · Joseph P. Bradley; Ward Hunt · John M. Harlan

Case opinions
- Majority: Bradley, joined by Waite, Swayne, Miller, Strong, Hunt, and Harlan
- Dissent: Field, joined by Clifford

Laws applied
- U.S. Const. art. II, § 2, cl. 2

Ex parte Siebold, 100 U.S. 371 (1879), was a United States Supreme Court case concerning the separation of powers and the Appointments Clause.

== Background ==
Baltimore election officials were indicted under the Enforcement Act of 1870 for stuffing ballot boxes and destroying the votes of African Americans in a congressional election. In defense, they contested Congress' authority under the Appointments Clause to control their work as state officials.

After unsuccessfully seeking relief from Chief Justice Morrison Waite in his capacity as circuit justice, they petitioned the Supreme Court for habeas corpus, arguing that the statutes under which they had been prosecuted exceeded Congress's constitutional authority. They contended that, if those statutes were unconstitutional, the circuit court lacked jurisdiction and their convictions and sentences were void.

== Legal background ==
The Supreme Court’s decision in Ableman v. Booth (1859) established an important principle concerning the relationship between state and federal judicial authority. In that case, the Court held that state courts could not use habeas corpus to release a prisoner held under federal authority, reasoning that federal courts must be able to execute federal law without state interference.

Arising from continuing debates over the balance between state and federal authority, Ex parte Siebold turned on constitutional questions about the reach of national authority. Although Congress had granted federal courts jurisdiction over the criminal offenses at issue, the petitioners challenged whether the statutes creating those offenses were constitutional. The Court treated that question as "jurisdictional" in the sense that it could be examined on collateral review.

== Supreme Court ==
Writing for the majority, Associate Justice Joseph P. Bradley rejected the officials' claim to independence from federal oversight of their federal elections. Opining that the Fifteenth Amendment to the United States Constitution authorized the Enforcement Act of 1870, he upheld the act.

=== Habeas jurisdiction ===
The Court observed that the rule permitting habeas corpus where a conviction was void for a "clear and manifest want of criminality" was commonly illustrated by Bushel's Case (1670). It recounted that twelve jurors were imprisoned after acquitting William Penn and others of charges arising from an unlawful religious assembly. Although the Court of Common Pleas initially questioned whether it had jurisdiction to issue the writ in a criminal matter, it ultimately discharged the jurors on habeas corpus, concluding that their convictions were void because jurors could not be punished for the verdicts they returned. The Court also described Chief Justice John Vaughan's opinion in Bushel's Case as having "rarely been excelled for judicial eloquence."

The Court concluded that the petitioners' constitutional challenge was properly raised on habeas corpus because personal liberty was sufficiently important to permit review by habeas corpus where the lower court's jurisdiction depended entirely on the validity of the statute.

=== Merits ===
On the merits, the petitioners argued that, as state election officials, they could not be subjected to federal arrest and punishment for the performance of their duties. Bradley rejected the petitioners’ argument that state election officials were beyond federal authority. He explained that although states regulated congressional elections, Congress could add federal rules and oversee the conduct of election officials in federal elections.

=== Appointments Clause ===
The Court considered the argument that Congress could not authorize courts to appoint officers whose duties were not judicial in nature, stating that although "it is no doubt usual and proper" to vest the appointment of inferior officers in the branch "to which the duties of such officers appertain," there was "no absolute requirement to this effect in the Constitution," and that the choice of appointing authority "is a matter resting in the discretion of Congress." The Court upheld Congress's decision to authorize federal courts to appoint federal election supervisors to ensure Black participation in elections.

Addressing its earlier decision in Ex parte Hennen (1839), the Court explained that its observation that officers should ordinarily be appointed by the department to which they most appropriately belonged "was not intended to define the constitutional power of Congress in this regard, but rather to express the law or rule by which it should be governed."

Continuing its discussion of earlier precedent, the Court distinguished cases in which federal courts had declined to perform duties assigned by Congress, including reviewing pension claims arising from the American Revolutionary War and adjudicating claims for property damage caused by the United States Army during the Patriot War. It concluded that, unlike those statutes, "there is no such incongruity in the duty required as to excuse the courts from its performance, or to render their acts void." The scope of Ex parte Siebold has remained subject to debate because the decision did not clearly define the limits of judicial appointment authority.

== Legacy ==
The independent counsel provisions of the Ethics in Government Act of 1978 renewed debate over whether the appointment of independent counsel was "incongruous" with the judicial function. In Siebold, the Court had stated that there was "no such incongruity" between the duties assigned to courts and the judicial function. Addressing the independent counsel provisions, Harold Bruff framed the question as whether the Act granted courts a power that was "incongruous" with the judicial role. He concluded that "[h]istory suggests not," explaining that "[t]he separation between prosecution and adjudication has never been absolute" and that "[f]ederal judges have traditionally played a limited role in prosecution, by approving search warrants and supervising grand juries."

== Works cited ==
- Tuerkheimer, Frank (1988). "Prosecution of Criminal Cases: Where Executive and Judicial Power Meet" (PDF). American Criminal Law Review. 25.
