= List of United States Supreme Court cases, volume 185 =

Supreme Court of the United States
- Interactive map of Supreme Court of the United States
- 38°53′26″N 77°00′16″W
- Established: March 4, 1789; 236 years ago
- Location: Washington, D.C.
- Coordinates: 38°53′26″N 77°00′16″W
- Composition method: Presidential nomination with Senate confirmation
- Authorised by: Constitution of the United States, Art. III, § 1
- Judge term length: life tenure, subject to impeachment and removal
- Number of positions: 9 (by statute)
- Website: supremecourt.gov

This is a list of cases reported in volume 185 of United States Reports, decided by the Supreme Court of the United States in 1902.

== Justices of the Supreme Court at the time of volume 185 U.S. ==
The Supreme Court is established by Article III, Section 1 of the Constitution of the United States, which says: "The judicial Power of the United States, shall be vested in one supreme Court . . .". The size of the Court is not specified; the Constitution leaves it to Congress to set the number of justices. Under the Judiciary Act of 1789 Congress originally fixed the number of justices at six (one chief justice and five associate justices). Since 1789 Congress has varied the size of the Court from six to seven, nine, ten, and back to nine justices (always including one chief justice).

When the cases in volume 185 were decided the Court comprised the following nine members:

Portrait	Justice	Office	Home State	Succeeded	Date confirmed by the Senate (Vote)	Tenure on Supreme Court
	Melville Fuller	Chief Justice	Illinois	Morrison Waite	July 20, 1888 (41–20)	October 8, 1888 – July 4, 1910 (Died)
	John Marshall Harlan	Associate Justice	Kentucky	David Davis	November 29, 1877 (Acclamation)	December 10, 1877 – October 14, 1911 (Died)
	Horace Gray	Associate Justice	Massachusetts	Nathan Clifford	December 20, 1881 (51–5)	January 9, 1882 – September 15, 1902 (Died)
	David Josiah Brewer	Associate Justice	Kansas	Stanley Matthews	December 18, 1889 (53–11)	January 6, 1890 – March 28, 1910 (Died)
	Henry Billings Brown	Associate Justice	Michigan	Samuel Freeman Miller	December 29, 1890 (Acclamation)	January 5, 1891 – May 28, 1906 (Retired)
	George Shiras Jr.	Associate Justice	Pennsylvania	Joseph P. Bradley	July 26, 1892 (Acclamation)	October 10, 1892 – February 23, 1903 (Retired)
	Edward Douglass White	Associate Justice	Louisiana	Samuel Blatchford	February 19, 1894 (Acclamation)	March 12, 1894 – December 18, 1910 (Continued as chief justice)
	Rufus W. Peckham	Associate Justice	New York	Howell Edmunds Jackson	December 9, 1895 (Acclamation)	January 6, 1896 – October 24, 1909 (Died)
	Joseph McKenna	Associate Justice	California	Stephen Johnson Field	January 21, 1898 (Acclamation)	January 26, 1898 – January 5, 1925 (Retired)

== Citation style ==
Under the Judiciary Act of 1789 the federal court structure at the time comprised District Courts, which had general trial jurisdiction; Circuit Courts, which had mixed trial and appellate (from the US District Courts) jurisdiction; and the United States Supreme Court, which had appellate jurisdiction over the federal District and Circuit courts—and for certain issues over state courts. The Supreme Court also had limited original jurisdiction (i.e., in which cases could be filed directly with the Supreme Court without first having been heard by a lower federal or state court). There were one or more federal District Courts and/or Circuit Courts in each state, territory, or other geographical region.

The Judiciary Act of 1891 created the United States Courts of Appeals and reassigned the jurisdiction of most routine appeals from the district and circuit courts to these appellate courts. The Act created nine new courts that were originally known as the "United States Circuit Courts of Appeals." The new courts had jurisdiction over most appeals of lower court decisions. The Supreme Court could review either legal issues that a court of appeals certified or decisions of court of appeals by writ of certiorari.

Bluebook citation style is used for case names, citations, and jurisdictions.

- "# Cir." = United States Court of Appeals
  - e.g., "3d Cir." = United States Court of Appeals for the Third Circuit
- "C.C.D." = United States Circuit Court for the District of . . .
  - e.g.,"C.C.D.N.J." = United States Circuit Court for the District of New Jersey
- "D." = United States District Court for the District of . . .
  - e.g.,"D. Mass." = United States District Court for the District of Massachusetts
- "E." = Eastern; "M." = Middle; "N." = Northern; "S." = Southern; "W." = Western
  - e.g.,"C.C.S.D.N.Y." = United States Circuit Court for the Southern District of New York
  - e.g.,"M.D. Ala." = United States District Court for the Middle District of Alabama
- "Ct. Cl." = United States Court of Claims
- The abbreviation of a state's name alone indicates the highest appellate court in that state's judiciary at the time.
  - e.g.,"Pa." = Supreme Court of Pennsylvania
  - e.g.,"Me." = Supreme Judicial Court of Maine

== List of cases in volume 185 U.S. ==
Case Name	Page & year	Opinion of the Court	Concurring opinion(s)	Dissenting opinion(s)	Lower Court	Disposition
Tulare Irr. Dist. v. Shepard	1 (1902)	Peckham	none	none	C.C.S.D. Cal.	affirmed
Stockard v. Morgan	27 (1902)	Peckham	none	none	Tenn.	reversed
Sweringen v. City of St Louis	38 (1902)	Peckham	none	none	Mo.	dismissed
French G.L.S. Co. v. Springer	47 (1902)	Shiras	none	none	Or.	affirmed
French G.L.S. Co. v. Colwell	54 (1902)	Shiras	none	none	Or.	affirmed
Wilson v. Iseminger	55 (1902)	Shiras	none	none	Pa.	affirmed
Vicksburg W. Co. v. City of Vicksburg	65 (1902)	Shiras	none	none	C.C.S.D. Miss.	reversed
Rodgers v. United States	83 (1902)	Brewer	none	none	Ct. Cl.	affirmed
City of New York v. Pine	93 (1902)	Brewer	none	none	2d Cir.	reversed
Filhiol v. Maurice	108 (1902)	Fuller	none	none	C.C.E.D. Ark.	reversed
Michigan S. Co. v. Dix	112 (1902)	Fuller	none	none	Mich.	dismissed
Eastern B. & L. Ass'n v. Ebaugh	114 (1902)	McKenna	none	none	S.C.	affirmed
McIntosh v. Aubrey	122 (1902)	McKenna	none	none	Pa.	affirmed
Kansas v. Colorado	125 (1902)	Fuller	none	none	original	continued
Erie R.R. v. Purdy	148 (1902)	Harlan	none	none	N.Y. Sup. Ct.	dismissed
Hitz v. Jenks	155 (1902)	Harlan	none	none	D.C. Cir.	reversed
Talbot v. Sioux City F.N.B.	172 (1902)	McKenna	none	none	Iowa	affirmed
Talbot v. Sioux Nat'l Bank	182 (1902)	McKenna	none	none	Iowa	affirmed
United States v. Pendell	189 (1902)	Peckham	none	none	Ct. Priv. Land Cl.	affirmed
St. Louis C.C. Co. v. Illinois	203 (1902)	Brown	none	none	Ill.	affirmed
United States v. Lee Yen Tai	213 (1902)	Harlan	none	none	2d Cir.	certification
United States v. Borcherling	223 (1902)	Shiras	none	none	Ct. Cl.	affirmed
United States v. Finnell	236 (1902)	Harlan	none	Brown	Ct. Cl.	affirmed
Washington v. Northern S. Co.	254 (1902)	Fuller	none	none	original	leave to file granted
United States v. Green	256 (1902)	White	none	none	Ct. Priv. Land Cl.	affirmed
City of Covington v. Covington F. Nat'l Bank	270 (1902)	White	none	none	Ct. Cl.	dismissed
United States v. Van Duzee	278 (1902)	White	none	none	Ct. Cl.	reversed
Excelsior W.P. Co. v. Pacific Bridge Co.	282 (1902)	Brown	none	none	C.C.D. Wash.	reversed
Fok Young Yo v. United States	296 (1902)	Fuller	none	none	C.C.N.D. Cal.	affirmed
Lee Gon Yung v. United States	306 (1902)	Fuller	none	none	C.C.N.D. Cal.	affirmed
Fidelity M.L. Ass'n v. Mettler	308 (1902)	Fuller	none	Harlan	C.C.N.D. Tex.	affirmed
New Orleans W. Co. v. Louisiana	336 (1902)	Peckham	none	none	La.	dismissed
Woodworth v. Northwestern Mutual L. Ins. Co.	354 (1902)	White	none	none	8th Cir.	certification
Travelers' Ins. Co. v. Connecticut	364 (1902)	Brewer	none	none	Conn.	affirmed
Minnesota v. Hitchcock	373 (1902)	Brewer	none	none	original	dismissed
Carnegie Steel Co. v. Cambria Iron Co.	403 (1902)	Brown	none	White	3d Cir.	reversed
Swafford v. Templeton	487 (1902)	White	none	none	C.C.E.D. Tenn.	reversed
United States v. Copper Queen C.M. Co.	495 (1902)	Peckham	none	none	Sup. Ct. Terr. Ariz.	affirmed
Southwestern C. & I. Co. v. McBride	499 (1902)	White	none	none	8th Cir.	affirmed
McFaddin v. Evans S.B. Co.	505 (1902)	Shiras	none	none	8th Cir.	affirmed

== See also ==
- Certificate of division
