= United States v. Alaska Steamship Co. =

- Supreme Court of the United States

Decided May 17, 1920
- Full case name: United States and Interstate Commerce Commission v. Alaska Steamship Co. et al.
- Citations: 253 U.S. 113 (more)

Holding
- Changes to the statute during the appeals process made the lawsuit moot.

Court membership
- Chief Justice Edward D. White Associate Justices Joseph McKenna · Oliver W. Holmes Jr. William R. Day · Willis Van Devanter; Mahlon Pitney · James C. McReynolds; Louis Brandeis · John H. Clarke

Case opinion
- Majority: Day, joined by unanimous

Laws applied
- Transportation Act of 1920

United States v. Alaska Steamship Co., 253 U.S. 113 (1920), was a United States Supreme Court case in which the Court held that changes to the statute during the appeals process made the lawsuit moot.

== Description ==
In 1919, the Interstate Commerce Commission issued an order that required interstate carriers to file specific paperwork for domestic and international shipments. When carriers, including Alaska Steamship Company, sued for an injunction against the order, a panel of judges on the United States District Court for the Southern District of New York upheld the order and the Commission's authority to make it. The carriers appealed directly to the United States Supreme Court under the rules of that time: Congress provided a direct appeal-as-of-right to all decisions about injunctions related to the Commission.

In the meantime, Congress passed the Transportation Act of 1920, which limited the federal government's control of interstate carriers. The Supreme Court asked the parties for briefing about the effects of that law upon the case. As a result, the Court determined that the Commission no longer had the authority to make or enforce the order. Therefore, the Court declared that the case was moot.
