= List of United States Supreme Court cases, volume 199 =

Supreme Court of the United States
- Interactive map of Supreme Court of the United States
- 38°53′26″N 77°00′16″W
- Established: March 4, 1789; 236 years ago
- Location: Washington, D.C.
- Coordinates: 38°53′26″N 77°00′16″W
- Composition method: Presidential nomination with Senate confirmation
- Authorised by: Constitution of the United States, Art. III, § 1
- Judge term length: life tenure, subject to impeachment and removal
- Number of positions: 9 (by statute)
- Website: supremecourt.gov

This is a list of cases reported in volume 199 of United States Reports, decided by the Supreme Court of the United States in 1905.

== Justices of the Supreme Court at the time of volume 199 U.S. ==
The Supreme Court is established by Article III, Section 1 of the Constitution of the United States, which says: "The judicial Power of the United States, shall be vested in one supreme Court . . .". The size of the Court is not specified; the Constitution leaves it to Congress to set the number of justices. Under the Judiciary Act of 1789 Congress originally fixed the number of justices at six (one chief justice and five associate justices). Since 1789 Congress has varied the size of the Court from six to seven, nine, ten, and back to nine justices (always including one chief justice).

When the cases in volume 199 were decided the Court comprised the following nine members:

Portrait	Justice	Office	Home State	Succeeded	Date confirmed by the Senate (Vote)	Tenure on Supreme Court
	Melville Fuller	Chief Justice	Illinois	Morrison Waite	July 20, 1888 (41–20)	October 8, 1888 – July 4, 1910 (Died)
	John Marshall Harlan	Associate Justice	Kentucky	David Davis	November 29, 1877 (Acclamation)	December 10, 1877 – October 14, 1911 (Died)
	David Josiah Brewer	Associate Justice	Kansas	Stanley Matthews	December 18, 1889 (53–11)	January 6, 1890 – March 28, 1910 (Died)
	Henry Billings Brown	Associate Justice	Michigan	Samuel Freeman Miller	December 29, 1890 (Acclamation)	January 5, 1891 – May 28, 1906 (Retired)
	Edward Douglass White	Associate Justice	Louisiana	Samuel Blatchford	February 19, 1894 (Acclamation)	March 12, 1894 – December 18, 1910 (Continued as chief justice)
	Rufus W. Peckham	Associate Justice	New York	Howell Edmunds Jackson	December 9, 1895 (Acclamation)	January 6, 1896 – October 24, 1909 (Died)
	Joseph McKenna	Associate Justice	California	Stephen Johnson Field	January 21, 1898 (Acclamation)	January 26, 1898 – January 5, 1925 (Retired)
	Oliver Wendell Holmes Jr.	Associate Justice	Massachusetts	Horace Gray	December 4, 1902 (Acclamation)	December 8, 1902 – January 12, 1932 (Retired)
	William R. Day	Associate Justice	Ohio	George Shiras Jr.	February 23, 1903 (Acclamation)	March 2, 1903 – November 13, 1922 (Retired)

== Citation style ==
Under the Judiciary Act of 1789 the federal court structure at the time comprised District Courts, which had general trial jurisdiction; Circuit Courts, which had mixed trial and appellate (from the US District Courts) jurisdiction; and the United States Supreme Court, which had appellate jurisdiction over the federal District and Circuit courts—and for certain issues over state courts. The Supreme Court also had limited original jurisdiction (i.e., in which cases could be filed directly with the Supreme Court without first having been heard by a lower federal or state court). There were one or more federal District Courts and/or Circuit Courts in each state, territory, or other geographical region.

The Judiciary Act of 1891 created the United States Courts of Appeals and reassigned the jurisdiction of most routine appeals from the district and circuit courts to these appellate courts. The Act created nine new courts that were originally known as the "United States Circuit Courts of Appeals." The new courts had jurisdiction over most appeals of lower court decisions. The Supreme Court could review either legal issues that a court of appeals certified or decisions of court of appeals by writ of certiorari.

Bluebook citation style is used for case names, citations, and jurisdictions.

- "# Cir." = United States Court of Appeals
  - e.g., "3d Cir." = United States Court of Appeals for the Third Circuit
- "C.C.D." = United States Circuit Court for the District of . . .
  - e.g.,"C.C.D.N.J." = United States Circuit Court for the District of New Jersey
- "D." = United States District Court for the District of . . .
  - e.g.,"D. Mass." = United States District Court for the District of Massachusetts
- "E." = Eastern; "M." = Middle; "N." = Northern; "S." = Southern; "W." = Western
  - e.g.,"C.C.S.D.N.Y." = United States Circuit Court for the Southern District of New York
  - e.g.,"M.D. Ala." = United States District Court for the Middle District of Alabama
- "Ct. Cl." = United States Court of Claims
- The abbreviation of a state's name alone indicates the highest appellate court in that state's judiciary at the time.
  - e.g.,"Pa." = Supreme Court of Pennsylvania
  - e.g.,"Me." = Supreme Judicial Court of Maine

== List of cases in volume 199 U.S. ==
Case Name	Page and year	Opinion of the Court	Concurring opinion(s)	Dissenting opinion(s)	Lower Court	Disposition
People ex rel. Metropolitan Street Railway Company v. New York State Board of Tax Commissioners	1 (1905)	Brewer	none	none	N.Y. Sup. Ct.	affirmed
People ex rel. Brooklyn City Railroad v. New York State Board of Tax Commissioners	48 (1905)	Brewer	none	none	N.Y. Sup. Ct.	affirmed
People ex rel. Twenty-Third Street Railway Company v. New York State Board of Tax Commissioners	53 (1905)	Brewer	none	none	N.Y. Sup. Ct.	affirmed
Gleason v. White	54 (1905)	Brewer	none	none	Fla.	affirmed
Hyde v. Shine	62 (1905)	Brown	none	Peckham	C.C.N.D. Cal.	affirmed
Dimond v. Shine	88 (1905)	per curiam	none	none	C.C.N.D. Cal.	affirmed
Farrell v. O'Brien	89 (1905)	White	none	none	9th Cir.	affirmed
The Eliza Lines	119 (1905)	Holmes	none	Brown	1st Cir.	reversed
McGuire v. Blount	142 (1905)	Day	none	none	5th Cir.	affirmed
Guthrie v. Harkness	148 (1905)	Day	none	none	Utah	affirmed
Union Pacific Railroad Company v. Mason City and Fort Dodge Railroad Company	160 (1905)	Brewer	none	none	8th Cir.	affirmed
Nederland Life Insurance Company, Ltd. v. Meinert	171 (1905)	Peckham	none	none	7th Cir.	reversed
Corkran Oil and Development Company v. Arnaudet	182 (1905)	Fuller	none	none	La.	dismissed
Union Refrigerator Transit Co. v. Kentucky	194 (1905)	Brown	none	Holmes	Ky.	reversed
Marvin v. Trout	212 (1905)	Peckham	none	none	Ohio	affirmed
Rankin v. Barton	228 (1905)	McKenna	none	none	Kan.	reversed
Michigan ex rel. Kies v. Lowrey	233 (1905)	McKenna	none	none	Mich.	affirmed
Tampa Water Works Company v. City of Tampa	241 (1905)	Holmes	none	Brown	Fla.	affirmed
Chesapeake Beach Railway Company v. Washington, Potomac and Chesapeake Railroad Company	247 (1905)	Holmes	none	none	D.C. Cir.	affirmed
Sweeney v. Carter Oil Company	252 (1905)	Fuller	none	none	C.C.N.D.W. Va.	reversed
Cochran v. Montgomery County	260 (1905)	Fuller	none	none	5th Cir.	reversed
French v. Taylor	274 (1905)	Fuller	none	none	Wash.	dismissed
Donovan v. Pennsylvania Company	279 (1905)	Harlan	none	none	7th Cir.	affirmed
California Reduction Company v. Sanitary Reduction Works	306 (1905)	Harlan	none	none	9th Cir.	affirmed
Gardner v. Michigan	325 (1905)	Harlan	none	none	Mich.	affirmed
Hartman v. Butterfield Lumber Company	335 (1905)	Brewer	none	White	Miss.	affirmed
Hafemann v. Gross	342 (1905)	Brewer	none	White	Minn.	affirmed
Royal Insurance Company v. Miller	353 (1905)	White	none	none	D.P.R.	affirmed
Jack v. Kansas	372 (1905)	Peckham	none	none	Kan.	affirmed
McCune v. Essig	382 (1905)	McKenna	none	none	9th Cir.	affirmed
Estes v. Timmons	391 (1905)	McKenna	none	none	Sup. Ct. Terr. Okla.	affirmed
Simpson v. United States	397 (1905)	Holmes	none	none	Ct. Cl.	affirmed
Carroll v. Greenwich Insurance Company	401 (1905)	Holmes	Harlan	none	C.C.S.D. Iowa	reversed
United States v. Utah, Nevada and California Stage Company	414 (1905)	Day	none	none	Ct. Cl.	affirmed
Rogers v. Peck	425 (1905)	Day	none	none	D. Vt.	affirmed
South Carolina v. United States	437 (1905)	Brewer	none	White	Ct. Cl.	affirmed
Manigault v. Springs	473 (1905)	Brown	none	none	C.C.D.S.C.	affirmed
Petri v. Creelman Lumber Company	487 (1905)	White	none	none	C.C.N.D. Ill.	reversed
Foppiano v. Speed	501 (1905)	Peckham	none	none	Tenn.	affirmed
Trono v. United States	521 (1905)	Peckham	none	Harlan; McKenna	Phil.	affirmed
Clark v. Roller	541 (1905)	Holmes	none	none	D.C. Cir.	affirmed
Riggins v. United States	547 (1905)	Fuller	none	none	C.C.N.D. Ala.	reversed
People ex rel. Lieberman v. Van de Carr	552 (1905)	Day	Holmes	none	N.Y. Sup. Ct.	affirmed
Sjoli v. Dreschel	564 (1905)	Harlan	none	none	Minn.	reversed
Russian America Packing Company v. United States	570 (1905)	Brown	none	none	Ct. Cl.	affirmed
Royal Packing Company v. United States	579 (1905)	per curiam	none	none	Ct. Cl.	affirmed
Alexander v. Crollott	580 (1905)	Brown	none	none	Sup. Ct. Terr. N.M.	affirmed
Eclipse Bicycle Company v. Farrow	581 (1905)	Holmes	none	none	D.C. Cir.	reversed
Minnesota Iron Company v. Kline	593 (1905)	Holmes	none	none	Minn.	affirmed

== See also ==
- Certificate of division
