= Maguire v. Trefry =

- Supreme Court of the United States

Decided April 26, 1920
- Full case name: Maguire v. Trefry
- Citations: 253 U.S. 12 (more)

Holding
- A state may tax the income received by a resident as the beneficiary of a trust that is administered by the resident of another state.

Court membership
- Chief Justice Edward D. White Associate Justices Joseph McKenna · Oliver W. Holmes Jr. William R. Day · Willis Van Devanter; Mahlon Pitney · James C. McReynolds; Louis Brandeis · John H. Clarke

Case opinion
- Majority: Day, joined by unanimous

Maguire v. Trefry, 253 U.S. 12 (1920), was a United States Supreme Court case in which the Court held that a state may tax the income received by a resident as the beneficiary of a trust that is administered by the resident of another state.

== See also ==
- Kirtland v. Hotchkiss
