= Green v. Frazier =

- Supreme Court of the United States

Decided June 1, 1920
- Full case name: Green v. Frazier
- Citations: 253 U.S. 233 (more)

Holding
- A state's creation of a public welfare program is not reviewable by the Supreme Court under the Fourteenth Amendment.

Court membership
- Chief Justice Edward D. White Associate Justices Joseph McKenna · Oliver W. Holmes Jr. William R. Day · Willis Van Devanter; Mahlon Pitney · James C. McReynolds; Louis Brandeis · John H. Clarke

Case opinion
- Majority: Day, joined by unanimous

Laws applied
- Amendment XIV

Green v. Frazier, 253 U.S. 233 (1920), was a United States Supreme Court case in which the Court held that a state's creation of a public welfare program is not reviewable by the Supreme Court under the Fourteenth Amendment.

== Description ==
In 1919, North Dakota established the Industrial Commission of North Dakota and the Bank of North Dakota and provided them with large sums of public capital. Together, these entities took control of public utilities, oversaw a massive farming scheme for food, and built homes for North Dakota residents. Of this scheme, the Supreme Court said, "With the wisdom of such legislation, and the soundness of the economic policy involved we are not concerned. Whether it will result in ultimate good or harm it is not within our province to inquire. [...] [I]f [North Dakota] sees fit to enter upon such enterprises as are here involved, with the sanction of its constitution, its legislature and its people, we are not prepared to say that it is within the authority of this court... to set aside such action by judicial decision."

Justice William O. Douglas later called this event a "great experiment in socialism".
