= Nagle v. Rutledge =

- Supreme Court of the United States

Decided April 26, 1880
- Full case name: Nagle v. Rutledge
- Citations: 100 U.S. 675 (more)

Holding
- The amount in controversy in an appeal is determined by the actual amount disputed in the issues on appeal, not the total amount sought by the parties in the proceeding below.

Court membership
- Chief Justice Morrison Waite Associate Justices Nathan Clifford · Noah H. Swayne; Samuel F. Miller · Stephen J. Field; William Strong · Joseph P. Bradley; Ward Hunt · John M. Harlan

Case opinion
- Majority: Waite, joined by unanimous

Nagle v. Rutledge, 100 U.S. 675 (1880), was a United States Supreme Court case in which the Court held that the amount in controversy in an appeal is determined by the actual amount disputed in the issues on appeal, not the total amount sought by the parties in the proceeding below.

== Description ==
For a federal court to have subject matter jurisdiction over a case originating outside of the federal system, the amount in controversy must exceed a certain minimum; at the time of this case, that minimum was $1000 for a territorial court. The Supreme Court of Wyoming Territory ordered Nagle to pay Rutlege $969.63. To put the case over the $1000 minimum, Nagle pointed to a dispute over interest on a $210 debt allegedly owed to him by Rutlege. Mathematically, the interest on the $210 would not have exceeded $1000, so the Supreme Court determined that it did not have subject matter jurisdiction over the appeal.
