= List of United States Supreme Court cases, volume 533 =

This is a list of all United States Supreme Court cases from volume 533 of the United States Reports:

Case name	Citation	Date decided
Kansas v. Colorado	533 U.S. 1	2001
Kyllo v. United States	533 U.S. 27	2001
Tuan Anh Nguyen v. INS	533 U.S. 53	2001
Good News Club v. Milford Cent. Sch.	533 U.S. 98	2001
Denying access to a limited public forum on the ground that the applicant's use is religious in nature discriminates based on religious viewpoint in violation of the Free Speech Clause.
Alabama v. Bozeman	533 U.S. 146	2001
Cedric Kushner Promotions, Ltd. v. King	533 U.S. 158	2001
Duncan v. Walker	533 U.S. 167	2001
A federal habeas petition is not an "application for State postconviction or other collateral review" within the meaning of § 2244(d)(2), so the limitation period of a second habeas petition is not tolled by the first.
Saucier v. Katz	533 U.S. 194	2001
United States v. Mead Corp.	533 U.S. 218	2001
Idaho v. United States	533 U.S. 262	2001
INS v. St. Cyr	533 U.S. 289	2001
Calcano-Martinez v. INS	533 U.S. 348	2001
Appellate courts lack jurisdiction to hear petitions for direct review of final deportation orders based on convictions for aggravated felonies, but non-citizens can file habeas petitions.
Nevada v. Hicks	533 U.S. 353	2001
United States v. United Foods, Inc.	533 U.S. 405	2001
Federal Election Comm'n v. Colo. Republican Fed. Campaign Comm.	533 U.S. 431	2001
N.Y. Times Co. v. Tasini	533 U.S. 483	2001
Lorillard Tobacco Co. v. Reilly	533 U.S. 525	2001
Palazzolo v. Rhode Island	533 U.S. 606	2001
Tyler v. Cain	533 U.S. 656	2001
Zadvydas v. Davis	533 U.S. 678	2001
