= Tyler v. Cain =

- Supreme Court of the United States

Argued April 16, 2001 Decided June 28, 2001
- Full case name: Tyler v. Cain, Warden
- Docket no.: 00-5961
- Citations: 533 U.S. 656 (more) 121 S. Ct. 2478
- Argument: Oral argument
- Opinion announcement: Opinion announcement

Holding
- The rule established under Cage v. Louisiana (1990), where the court held certain jury instructions unconstitutional because the words used did not suggest the degree of proof required by the "beyond a reasonable doubt" standard, was not "made retroactive to cases on collateral review by the Supreme Court."

Court membership
- Chief Justice William Rehnquist Associate Justices John P. Stevens · Sandra Day O'Connor; Antonin Scalia · Anthony Kennedy; David Souter · Clarence Thomas; Ruth Bader Ginsburg · Stephen Breyer

Case opinions
- Majority: Thomas, joined by Rehnquist, O'Connor, Scalia, Kennedy
- Concurrence: O'Connor
- Dissent: Breyer, joined by Stevens, Souter, Ginsburg

Laws applied
- Antiterrorism and Effective Death Penalty Act of 1996 (AEDPA)

Tyler v. Cain, 533 U.S. 656 (2001) is a United States Supreme Court case in which the Court held that the rule established under Cage v. Louisiana (1990), where the Court held certain jury instructions unconstitutional because the words used did not suggest the degree of proof required by the "beyond a reasonable doubt" standard, was not "made retroactive to cases on collateral review by the Supreme Court." Tyler is the primary case regarding the retroactivity of new rules to successive habeas petitions.

== Background ==
In March 1975, Melvin Tyler got into an argument with his estranged girlfriend. Tyler went to her house and fired shots from a pistol into one of her windows; the bullets ricocheted and killed their 20-year-old daughter. A jury found him guilty and he was sentenced to life in prison without parole. Tyler appealed but the Louisiana Supreme Court affirmed his conviction. By 1986, Tyler filed five state petitions for habeas corpus (post-conviction) relief, which were all denied. Tyler also filed a federal petition for post-conviction relief, which the federal district court denied; this denial was affirmed on appeal.

In 1990, the Supreme Court held in Cage v. Louisiana that certain jury instructions violated the Due Process Clause of the Fourteenth Amendment to the United States Constitution because the words "substantial" and "grave" did not suggest the degree of proof required by the "beyond a reasonable doubt" standard. Thereafter Tyler filed a sixth state post-conviction relief petition, arguing that the rule in Cage should apply retroactively because the jury instructions in his case were similar to those found unconstitutional in Cage. The state trial court denied the petition, and the Louisiana Supreme Court affirmed.

In 1997, Tyler filed a petition in the United States Court of Appeals for the Fifth Circuit for permission to file a second post-conviction relief petition. It is required that a prisoner seeking to file a second petition for post-conviction relief must first obtain an order from the court of appeals authorizing the district court to consider the petition. The Fifth Circuit granted Tyler's motion, finding that Tyler made the requisite prima facie ("at first sight") showing that the claim relied on a new rule of constitutional law made retroactive on collateral review by the United States Supreme Court.

Tyler then filed a second habeas petition in the United States District Court for the Eastern District of Louisiana. The district court ruled that Cage applies retroactively on collateral review, but that Tyler was not entitled to collateral relief based on the merits of his case. The Fifth Circuit affirmed on different grounds, denying Tyler's petition because he "could not show that any Supreme Court decision render[ed] the Cage decision retroactively applicable to cases on collateral review."

== Supreme Court ==
=== Majority opinion ===
The Supreme Court granted certiorari because of conflicts among circuit courts as to whether the new constitutional rule in Cage v. Louisiana applies retroactively on collateral review. In a 5-4 opinion written by Justice Clarence Thomas, the Supreme Court affirmed the Fifth Circuit's denial of Tyler's habeas petition.

The Antiterrorism and Effective Death Penalty Act of 1996 (AEDPA) lays out the process for which prisoners may seek post-conviction relief in federal court. The gatekeeper provision of section 2244(b) requires that a claim from a first petition that is presented in a second petition must be dismissed; the same applies for claims not presented in the first petition, unless the petitioner can show that the new claim “relies on a new rule of constitutional law made retroactive to cases on collateral review by the Supreme Court that was previously unavailable.”

The Court looked to the construction of the gatekeeper provision, interpreting the word "made" to mean "held", and held that a new constitutional rules only applies retroactively on collateral review if the Supreme Court holds that it does. Because no holding of the Court made the rule retroactive, the Court said that the Cage rule could not be applied retroactively on collateral review, and that Tyler's petition was barred under section 2244(b)(2)(A). Justice Thomas explained: "The only holding in Cage is that the particular jury instruction violated the Due Process Clause."

=== Concurring opinion ===
Justice Sandra Day O'Connor wrote a concurring opinion that explained the multiple ways that the Court could hold that a new constitutional rule applies retroactively on collateral review: by explicitly holding so, or by multiple holdings that “logically dictate the retroactivity of the new rule." This "multiple holdings" analysis is more generous than and in tension with the suggestion by the majority that the Supreme Court must always hold a new constitutional rule as retroactively applicable. Courts have adopted Justice O'Connor's "multiple holdings" analysis to determine whether rules apply retroactively.

=== Dissent ===
Justice Stephen Breyer, joined by Justices John Paul Stevens, David Souter and Ruth Bader Ginsburg, filed a dissenting opinion. The dissent argued that the new constitutional rule in Cage has been held to apply retroactively on collateral review, and that Tyler's habeas petition should be allowed. Justice Breyer outlined the possible negative consequences of the majority's decision:

"After today's opinion, the only way in which this Court can make a rule such as Cage's retroactive is to repeat its Sullivan reasoning in a case triggered by a prisoner's filing a first habeas petition (a "second or successive" petition itself being barred by the provision here at issue) or in some other case that presents the issue in a posture that allows such language to have the status of a "holding." Then, after the Court takes the case and says that it meant what it previously said, prisoners could file "second or successive" petitions to take advantage of the now-clearly-made-applicable new rule. We will be required to restate the obvious, case by case, even when we have explicitly said, but not "held," that a new rule is retroactive."

=== Effects of decision ===
The decision in Tyler has been criticized as a narrow interpretation that limits successive habeas petitions. The Court's holding in Tyler narrowed federal habeas review because before Tyler, an inmate could have argued a new constitutional rule from the Supreme Court applies retroactively if the rule fell under one of the two exceptions established in Teague v. Lane (1989), and reviewing courts had more discretion to rule on the merits of such petitions. The two exceptions established in Teague include "watershed" (crucial) rules of criminal procedure and "substantive" rules “that narrow the scope of a criminal statute by interpreting its terms” or involve “constitutional determinations that place particular conduct or persons covered by the statute beyond the State’s power to punish.” In Tyler, the Court suggested that even if a new rule fell under one of the exceptions in Teague, the new rule does not apply retroactively unless the Court explicitly says so.

== See also ==
- Teague v. Lane
- Post conviction
- Antiterrorism and Effective Death Penalty Act of 1996
- 2000 term opinions of the Supreme Court of the United States
- 2000 term United States Supreme Court opinions of Clarence Thomas
- 2000 term United States Supreme Court opinions of Stephen Breyer
- 2000 term United States Supreme Court opinions of Sandra Day O'Connor

== Sources ==
- "Tyler v. Cain 121 S. Ct. 2478 (2001)". Capital Defense Journal. 14 (1): 225–229. September 1, 2001.
- Gehring, Ronn (2003). "Tyler v. Cain: A Fork in the Path for Habeas Corpus or the End of the Road for Collateral Review?" (PDF). Akron Law Review. 35 (1): 181–219.
- Gabay, Thomas H. (2016). "Using Johnson v. United States to Reframe Retroactivity for Second or Successive Collateral Challenges". Fordham Law Review. 84 (4): 1611–1651.
- Vladeck, Stephen I. (2015). "Using the Supreme Court's Original Habeas Corpus Jurisdiction to "Make" New Rules Retroactive". American University Washington College of Law.
