= List of United States Supreme Court cases, volume 100 =

Supreme Court of the United States
- Interactive map of Supreme Court of the United States
- 38°53′26″N 77°00′16″W
- Established: March 4, 1789; 237 years ago
- Location: Washington, D.C.
- Coordinates: 38°53′26″N 77°00′16″W
- Composition method: Presidential nomination with Senate confirmation
- Authorised by: Constitution of the United States, Art. III, § 1
- Judge term length: life tenure, subject to impeachment and removal
- Number of positions: 9 (by statute)
- Website: supremecourt.gov

This is a list of cases reported in volume 100 of United States Reports, decided by the Supreme Court of the United States in 1879 and 1880.

== Justices of the Supreme Court at the time of 100 U.S. ==
The Supreme Court is established by Article III, Section 1 of the Constitution of the United States, which says: "The judicial Power of the United States, shall be vested in one supreme Court . . .". The size of the Court is not specified; the Constitution leaves it to Congress to set the number of justices. Under the Judiciary Act of 1789 Congress originally fixed the number of justices at six (one chief justice and five associate justices). Since 1789 Congress has varied the size of the Court from six to seven, nine, ten, and back to nine justices (always including one chief justice).

When the cases in 100 U.S. were decided the Court comprised the following nine members:

Portrait	Justice	Office	Home State	Succeeded	Date confirmed by the Senate (Vote)	Tenure on Supreme Court
	Morrison Waite	Chief Justice	Ohio	Salmon P. Chase	January 21, 1874 (63–0)	March 4, 1874 – March 23, 1888 (Died)
	Nathan Clifford	Associate Justice	Maine	Benjamin Robbins Curtis	January 12, 1858 (26–23)	January 21, 1858 – July 25, 1881 (Died)
	Noah Haynes Swayne	Associate Justice	Ohio	John McLean	January 24, 1862 (38–1)	January 27, 1862 – January 24, 1881 (Retired)
	Samuel Freeman Miller	Associate Justice	Iowa	Peter Vivian Daniel	July 16, 1862 (Acclamation)	July 21, 1862 – October 13, 1890 (Died)
	Stephen Johnson Field	Associate Justice	California	newly created seat	March 10, 1863 (Acclamation)	May 10, 1863 – December 1, 1897 (Retired)
	William Strong	Associate Justice	Pennsylvania	Robert Cooper Grier	February 18, 1870 (No vote recorded)	March 14, 1870 – December 14, 1880 (Retired)
	Joseph P. Bradley	Associate Justice	New Jersey	newly created seat	March 21, 1870 (46–9)	March 23, 1870 – January 22, 1892 (Died)
	Ward Hunt	Associate Justice	New York	Samuel Nelson	December 11, 1872 (Acclamation)	January 9, 1873 – January 27, 1882 (Retired)
	John Marshall Harlan	Associate Justice	Kentucky	David Davis	November 29, 1877 (Acclamation)	December 10, 1877 – October 14, 1911 (Died)

== Notable Cases in 100 U.S. ==
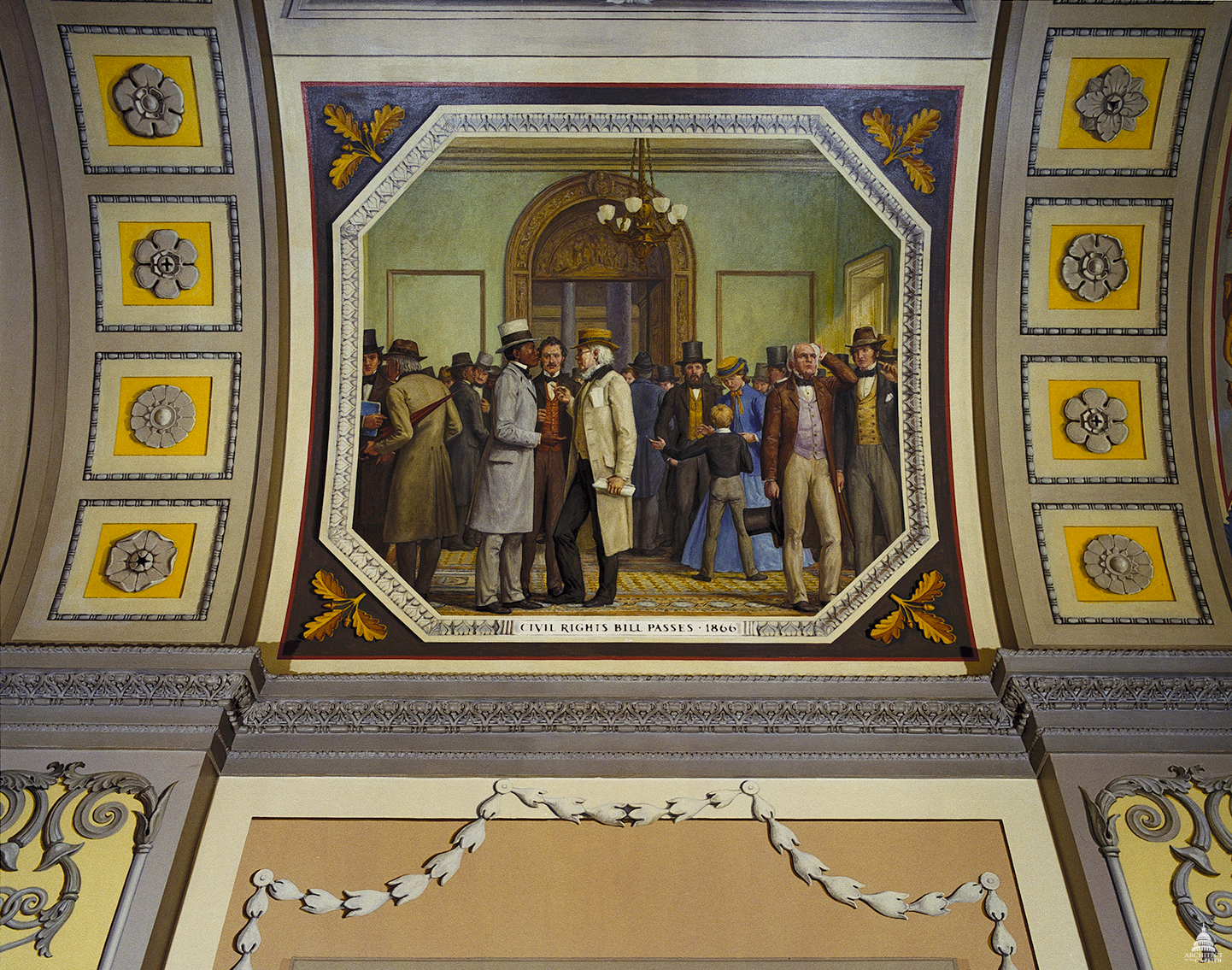
Passage of the 1866 Civil Rights Act, U.S. Capitol mural

=== Trade-Mark Cases ===
The Trade-Mark Cases, 100 U.S. 82 (1879), were three cases consolidated into a single appeal before the United States Supreme Court, which in 1879 ruled that the Copyright Clause of the Constitution gives Congress no power to protect or regulate trademarks. In response, Congress passed the Trade Mark Act of 1881, which was based on its Commerce Clause power and therefore passed constitutional review.

=== Strauder v. West Virginia ===
Strauder v. West Virginia, 100 U.S. 303 (1880), was the first instance in which the Supreme Court reversed a state court decision denying a defendant's motion to remove his criminal trial to federal court under Section 3 of the Civil Rights Act of 1866. The Court's holding established the proposition that it is a denial to criminal defendants of the equal protection of the law for a state to exclude persons from service on a grand or petit jury on account of race, color, or previous condition of servitude.

== Citation style ==
Under the Judiciary Act of 1789 the federal court structure at the time comprised District Courts, which had general trial jurisdiction; Circuit Courts, which had mixed trial and appellate (from the US District Courts) jurisdiction; and the United States Supreme Court, which had appellate jurisdiction over the federal District and Circuit courts—and for certain issues over state courts. The Supreme Court also had limited original jurisdiction (i.e., in which cases could be filed directly with the Supreme Court without first having been heard by a lower federal or state court). There were one or more federal District Courts and/or Circuit Courts in each state, territory, or other geographical region.

Bluebook citation style is used for case names, citations, and jurisdictions.

- "C.C.D." = United States Circuit Court for the District of . . .
  - e.g.,"C.C.D.N.J." = United States Circuit Court for the District of New Jersey
- "D." = United States District Court for the District of . . .
  - e.g.,"D. Mass." = United States District Court for the District of Massachusetts
- "E." = Eastern; "M." = Middle; "N." = Northern; "S." = Southern; "W." = Western
  - e.g.,"C.C.S.D.N.Y." = United States Circuit Court for the Southern District of New York
  - e.g.,"M.D. Ala." = United States District Court for the Middle District of Alabama
- "Ct. Cl." = United States Court of Claims
- The abbreviation of a state's name alone indicates the highest appellate court in that state's judiciary at the time.
  - e.g.,"Pa." = Supreme Court of Pennsylvania
  - e.g.,"Me." = Supreme Judicial Court of Maine

== List of cases in 100 U.S. ==
Case Name	Page and year	Opinion of the Court	Concurring opinion(s)	Dissenting opinion(s)	Lower court	Disposition
Ex parte French	1 (1879)	Waite	none	none	C.C.D. Cal.	mandamus denied
Tintsman v. National Bank	6 (1879)	Waite	none	none	C.C.W.D. Pa.	dismissed
Garneau v. Dozier	7 (1879)	Waite	none	none	C.C.E.D. Mo.	dismissal denied
Soule v. United States	8 (1879)	Clifford	none	none	C.C.D. Cal.	affirmed
Ex parte Reed	13 (1879)	Swayne	none	none	original	habeas corpus denied
New York Central Railroad Company v. Fraloff	24 (1879)	Harlan	none	Field	C.C.S.D.N.Y.	affirmed
United States v. Hirsch	33 (1879)	Miller	none	none	C.C.S.D.N.Y.	certification
Union C.S.M. Company v. Taylor	37 (1879)	Strong	none	none	C.C.D. Nev.	affirmed
National Bank v. Insurance Company	43 (1879)	Waite	none	none	not indicated	continued
Tillson v. United States	43 (1879)	Waite	none	none	Ct. Cl.	affirmed
Fairfield v. Gallatin County	47 (1879)	Strong	none	none	C.C.S.D. Ill.	reversed
Cowell v. Colorado Springs Company	55 (1879)	Field	none	none	Supreme Ct. Terr. Colo.	affirmed
American Emigrant Company v. Adams County	61 (1879)	Bradley	none	none	C.C.D. Iowa	reversed
Holden v. Savings and Trust Company	72 (1879)	Swayne	none	none	Supreme Ct. D.C.	affirmed
Arthur v. Herold	75 (1879)	Waite	none	none	C.C.S.D.N.Y.	affirmed
Kansas Pacific Railway Company v. Twombly	78 (1879)	Waite	none	none	Supreme Ct. Terr. Colo.	affirmed
Trade-Mark Cases	82 (1879)	Miller	none	none	C.C.S.D.N.Y. and Ohio	certification
Hurt v. Hollingsworth	100 (1879)	Field	none	none	C.C.E.D. Tex.	reversed
Ricker v. Powell	104 (1879)	Waite	none	none	C.C.N.D. Ill.	affirmed
Glendale E.F. Company v. Smith	110 (1879)	Waite	none	none	C.C.D. Mass.	affirmed
Baltimore and Potomac Railroad Company v. Trook	112 (1879)	Waite	none	none	Supreme Ct. D.C.	dismissed
Lansdale v. Daniels	113 (1879)	Clifford	none	none	Cal.	affirmed
United States v. Curtis	119 (1879)	Miller	none	none	C.C.D. Mass.	affirmed
Hatch v. Standard Oil Company	124 (1879)	Clifford	none	none	C.C.E.D. Mich.	affirmed
City of Brownsville v. Cavazos	138 (1879)	Field	none	none	C.C.E.D. Tex.	affirmed
Moore v. Simonds	145 (1879)	Waite	none	none	C.C.D. La.	affirmed
Ballard Paving Company v. Mulford	147 (1879)	Waite	none	none	Supreme Ct. D.C.	dismissed
Clark v. Freedman's S. and T. Company	149 (1879)	Harlan	none	none	Supreme Ct. D.C.	affirmed
Hinckley v. Gilman, Clinton and Springfield Railroad Company	153 (1879)	Miller	none	none	C.C.S.D. Ill.	affirmed
Dow v. Johnson	158 (1880)	Field	Swayne (part)	Swayne (part), Clifford, Miller	C.C.D. Me.	reversed
National Savings Bank v. Ward	195 (1880)	Clifford	none	Waite	Supreme Ct. D.C.	affirmed
Phillips v. Moore	208 (1879)	Field	none	none	C.C.E.D. Tex.	affirmed
Hough v. Texas and Pacific Railway Company	213 (1880)	Harlan	none	none	C.C.W.D. Tex.	reversed
Craig v. Smith	226 (1879)	Waite	none	none	C.C.D. Kan.	affirmed
United States v. Perryman	235 (1880)	Waite	none	none	Ct. Cl.	reversed
Oates v. First National Bank	239 (1879)	Harlan	none	none	C.C.M.D. Ala.	affirmed
Trenouth v. City of San Francisco	251 (1880)	Field	none	none	Cal.	affirmed
Tennessee v. Davis	257 (1880)	Strong	none	Clifford	C.C.M.D. Tenn.	certification
Strauder v. West Virginia	303 (1880)	Strong	none	Field	W. Va.	reversed
Virginia v. Rives	313 (1880)	Strong	Field	none	C.C.W.D. Va.	mandamus granted
Ex parte Virginia	339 (1880)	Strong	none	Field	C.C.W.D. Va.	habeas corpus denied
Ex parte Siebold	371 (1880)	Bradley	none	none	C.C.D. Md.	habeas corpus denied
Ex parte Clarke	399 (1880)	Bradley	none	Field	C.C.S.D. Ohio	habeas corpus denied
Packet Company v. City of St. Louis	423 (1880)	Harlan	none	none	C.C.E.D. Mo.	affirmed
City of Vicksburg v. Tobin	430 (1880)	Harlan	none	none	C.C.S.D. Miss.	reversed
Guy v. City of Baltimore	434 (1880)	Harlan	none	Waite	City Ct. Balt.	reversed
Pierce v. Wade	444 (1880)	Waite	none	none	C.C.D. Kan.	dismissed
Case v. Citizens' Bank	446 (1880)	Clifford	none	none	C.C.D. La.	affirmed
Removal Cases	457 (1879)	Waite	Strong, Bradley	none	multiple	reversed (all cases)
Hauenstein v. Lynham	483 (1880)	Swayne	none	none	Va.	reversed
Kirtland v. Hotchkiss	491 (1879)	Harlan	none	none	Conn.	dismissed
Parish v. United States	500 (1880)	Miller	none	none	Ct. Cl.	reversed
United States v. Bowen	508 (1880)	Miller	none	none	Ct. Cl.	affirmed
Mount Pleasant v. Beckwith	514 (1880)	Clifford	none	Miller	C.C.E.D. Wis.	affirmed
United States v. Murray	536 (1880)	Waite	none	none	Ct. Cl.	reversed
People v. Weaver	539 (1880)	Miller	none	none	N.Y.	reversed
Williams v. Weaver	547 (1880)	Miller	none	none	N.Y.	affirmed
Newton v. Mahoning County	548 (1880)	Swayne	none	none	Ohio	affirmed
Meeks v. Olpherts	564 (1880)	Miller	none	none	C.C.D. Cal.	affirmed
Montgomery v. Sawyer	571 (1880)	Bradley	none	none	C.C.D. La.	reversed
Dickerson v. Colgrove	578 (1880)	Swayne	none	none	C.C.W.D. Mich.	affirmed
Cass County v. Gillett	585 (1879)	Bradley	none	none	C.C.W.D. Mo.	affirmed
Michigan Central Railroad Company v. Slack	595 (1880)	Miller	none	none	C.C.D. Mass.	affirmed
Jones v. Blackwell	599 (1880)	Harlan	none	none	C.C.D. La.	reversed
Shaw v. Little Rock and Fort Smith Railroad Company	605 (1880)	Waite	none	none	C.C.E.D. Ark.	affirmed
Insurance Company v. Gridley	614 (1880)	Swayne	none	none	C.C.E.D.N.Y.	affirmed
Kidd v. Johnson	617 (1880)	Field	none	none	C.C.D. La.	affirmed
Wills v. Russell	621 (1880)	Clifford	none	none	C.C.D. Mass.	affirmed
National Savings Bank v. Creswell	630 (1880)	Miller	none	none	Supreme Ct. D.C.	affirmed
Florida Central Railroad Company v. Schutte	644 (1879)	Waite	none	none	C.C.N.D. Fla.	conditional dismissal
Kentucky Improvement Company v. Slack	648 (1880)	Clifford	none	Field	C.C.D. Mass.	affirmed
Eastern Kentucky Railway Company v. Slack	659 (1880)	Clifford	none	none	C.C.D. Mass.	affirmed
Railroad Company v. Blair	661 (1879)	Waite	none	none	C.C.N.D. Ill.	conditional dismissal
United States v. Lippitt	663 (1880)	Harlan	none	none	Ct. Cl.	affirmed
Burns v. Meyer	671 (1880)	Bradley	none	none	C.C.E.D. Mo.	affirmed
Branch v. United States	673 (1880)	Waite	none	none	Ct. Cl.	affirmed
Nagle v. Rutledge	675 (1880)	Waite	none	none	Supreme Ct. Terr. Wyo.	dismissed
Howe Machine Company v. Gage	676 (1880)	Swayne	none	none	Tenn.	affirmed
Embry v. United States	680 (1880)	Waite	none	none	Ct. Cl.	affirmed
First National Bank v. Burkhardt	686 (1880)	Swayne	none	none	C.C.S.D. Ohio	affirmed
Manning v. John Hancock Mutual Life Insurance Company	693 (1880)	Strong	none	none	C.C.S.D.N.Y.	affirmed
First National Bank v. Graham	699 (1880)	Swayne	none	none	Pa.	affirmed
Cox v. National Bank	704 (1880)	Clifford	none	none	C.C.D. Ky.	affirmed
