= Kirtland v. Hotchkiss =

- Supreme Court of the United States

Decided November 17th, 1879
- Full case name: Kirtland v. Hotchkiss
- Citations: 100 U.S. 491 (more)

Case history
- Prior: Kirtland v. Hotchkisx, 42 Conn. 426 (1875)

Holding
- A state may tax a debt held by a resident upon a resident of another State.

Court membership
- Chief Justice Morrison Waite Associate Justices Nathan Clifford · Noah H. Swayne; Samuel F. Miller · Stephen J. Field; William Strong · Joseph P. Bradley; Ward Hunt · John M. Harlan

Case opinion
- Majority: Harlan, joined by unanimous

Kirtland v. Hotchkiss, 100 U.S. 491 (1879), was a United States Supreme Court case in which the Court held that a state may tax a debt held by a resident upon a resident of another State. That is, the situs of the debt is with the creditor, not the debtor. This ignores the possibility of multiple taxation.

== Background ==
The debt in this case was a mortgage on land in a different state. The state where the creditor lived levied a tax of the land's assessed value based on his ownership of the land.

== Opinion of the court ==
Justice Harlan wrote the unanimous opinion, published on November 17, 1879. The court held that the tax was valid.

Another pertinent point from this case was that federal courts cannot interfere in state tax schemes without some kind of state interference with federal authority or a violation of the federal Constitution. The court responded to the idea that unjust taxation ought to be prevented by the courts by saying that the purpose of the Constitution was not to prevent every kind of unfairness or abuse of power that may be committed by the states.

== Subsequent developments ==
The doctrine mobilia sequuntur personam that this case represents was abandoned for the purpose of taxing tangibles, which are now subject to a property tax only at the situs. The Supreme Court declared as such in Union Refrigerator Transit Co. v. Kentucky (1905). Even so, the doctrine and Kirtland remained good law for intangibles after that.

== See also ==
- Maguire v. Trefry
