= Union Refrigerator Transit Co. v. Kentucky =

- Supreme Court of the United States

Decided November 13, 1905
- Full case name: Union Refrigerator Transit Co. v. Kentucky
- Citations: 199 U.S. 194 (more)

Holding
- Taxing a corporation's tangible property that is permanently located in other states and is used for the benefit of the corporation in those other states is unconstitutional.

Court membership
- Chief Justice Melville Fuller Associate Justices John M. Harlan · David J. Brewer; Henry B. Brown · Edward D. White; Rufus W. Peckham · Joseph McKenna; Oliver W. Holmes Jr. · William R. Day

Case opinions
- Majority: Brown, joined by unanimous
- Concurrence: White
- Concurrence: Holmes (in judgment)

Laws applied
- Fourteenth Amendment

Union Refrigerator Transit Co. v. Kentucky, 199 U.S. 194 (1905), was a United States Supreme Court case in which the court held that taxing a corporation's tangible property that is permanently located in other states and is used for the benefit of the corporation in those other states is unconstitutional.

== Background ==
A Kentucky revenue agent of filed an action in a Jefferson County court against Union Refrigerator Transit Company, a transit company. The comptroller of the company lived in St. Louis, Missouri. The Kentucky action sought to have the company's property assessed for state, county, and municipal taxation and to have the company pay a 20% penalty on the aggregate amount of the tax.

The trial court held that recovery was limited to the years between 1897 and 1900. During that time, Union's rolling stock consisted of 2000 cars worth $200 each. Union rented the cars to shippers, who took possession of them in Milwaukee, Wisconsin and used them for the carriage of freight in the United States, Canada, and Mexico. Union was paid by the railroads in proportion to the mileage made over their lines.

The method of determining Union's tax liability in Kentucky was determine the proportion of its cars as, under a system of averages upon their gross earnings, were shown to be used in the State of Kentucky during the fiscal year. The trial court found that twenty-eight cars were taxable for 1897, twenty-nine for 1898, forty for 1899, and sixty-seven for 1900. Other cars were not taxable.

On appeal, the circuit court affirmed the trial court. The Court of Appeals of Kentucky then reversed the judgment, determined that the company was liable to taxation upon all 2000 cars, and directed the court below to enter judgment against Union for the taxes appropriate to this number.

A writ of error was sent to the Supreme Court.

== Opinion of the court ==
The Supreme Court issued an opinion on November 13, 1905.

In an opinion by Justice Henry B. Brown, the court said that the doctrine of mobilia sequuntur personam does not apply to tangible personal property permanently located in another state where it is employed and protected, acquires a situs, and is subject to be there taxed irrespective of the domicile of the owner. An attempt on the part of the state in which the owner is domiciled to tax such property amounts to a deprivation of property without due process of law within the purview of the Fourteenth Amendment. Brown write that "The proper use of a legal fiction is to prevent injustice and... may only be resorted to when convenience and justice so require."

=== Concurrences ===
Justice Edward Douglass White concurred without a separate opinion. Justice Oliver W. Holmes Jr. concurred in the judgment because it "probably is a desirable one" but said that neither he nor Chief Justice Melville Fuller understood how the Fourteenth Amendment was supposed to justify it.

== Significance ==
At the time of this decision, it was not unusual to apply mobilia sequuntur personam to all property. This case created a distinction between tangible and intangible property because the doctrine still applied to intangibles. For example, the earlier case Kirtland v. Hotchkiss upheld a tax on a debt secured by a mortgage on land.
