= Cedric Kushner Promotions, Ltd. v. King =

- Supreme Court of the United States

Argued April 18, 2001 Decided June 11, 2001
- Full case name: Cedric Kushner Promotions, Limited v. Don King, et al.
- Citations: 533 U.S. 158 (more) 121 S. Ct. 2087; 150 L. Ed. 2d 198

Case history
- Prior: Complaint dismissed, 1999 WL 771366 (S.D.N.Y., 1999); affirmed, 219 F.3d 115 (2d Cir. 2000)

Holding
- Don King and his corporation are a distinct "person" and "enterprise," allowing Racketeer Influenced and Corrupt Organizations Act to apply.

Court membership
- Chief Justice William Rehnquist Associate Justices John P. Stevens · Sandra Day O'Connor; Antonin Scalia · Anthony Kennedy; David Souter · Clarence Thomas; Ruth Bader Ginsburg · Stephen Breyer

Case opinion
- Majority: Breyer, joined by unanimous

Laws applied
- Racketeer Influenced and Corrupt Organizations Act

Cedric Kushner Promotions, Ltd. v. King, 533 U.S. 158 (2001), was a United States Supreme Court case concerning the extent to which the Racketeer Influenced and Corrupt Organizations Act (RICO) applied to certain types of corporation-individual organizations. In this case, the Court decided unanimously to apply it to respondent Don King.

== Background ==
Cedric Kushner Promotions, Ltd., a corporate promoter of boxing matches, sued Don King, the president and sole shareholder of a rival corporation, alleging that King had conducted his corporation's affairs in violation of RICO. RICO makes it "unlawful for any person employed by or associated with any enterprise... to conduct or participate... in the conduct of such enterprise's affairs through a pattern of racketeering activity." The District Court dismissed the complaint. In affirming the decision, the Second Circuit Court of Appeals held that RICO applies only where a plaintiff shows the existence of two separate entities, a "person" and a distinct "enterprise," the affairs of which that "person" improperly conducts. The court concluded that King was part of the corporation, not a "person," distinct from the "enterprise," who allegedly improperly conducted the "enterprise's affairs."

== Opinion of the Court ==
Justice Stephen Breyer wrote the decision of the Court, which unanimously reversed the appellate court. The Court held that "the need for two distinct entities is satisfied; hence, the RICO provision... applies when a corporate employee unlawfully conducts the affairs of the corporation of which he is the sole owner -- whether he conducts those affairs within the scope, or beyond the scope, of corporate authority." "The corporate owner/employee, a natural person, is distinct from the corporation itself, a legally different entity," Justice Breyer wrote. "A corporate employee who conducts the corporation's affairs through an unlawful RICO 'pattern... of activity,' uses that corporation as a 'vehicle' whether he is, or is not, its sole owner." Under this reading of the statute, the Court of appeals' decision was reached in error; the case was sent back to them for future disposition of the case.

== See also ==
- United States v. Bestfoods
