= Alabama v. Bozeman =

- Supreme Court of the United States

Argued April 17, 2001 Decided June 11, 2001
- Full case name: Alabama v. Michael Herman Bozeman
- Citations: 533 U.S. 146 (more) 121 S. Ct. 2079; 150 L. Ed. 2d 188; 2001 U.S. LEXIS 4310; 69 U.S.L.W. 4465; 2001 Cal. Daily Op. Service 4735; 2001 Daily Journal DAR 5851; 2001 Colo. J. C.A.R. 2952; 14 Fla. L. Weekly Fed. S 358

Case history
- Prior: On writ of certiorari to the Supreme Court of Alabama

Holding
- The literal language of Article IV(e) of the Interstate Agreement on Detainers bars any further criminal proceedings when a defendant is returned to the original place of imprisonment before trial.

Court membership
- Chief Justice William Rehnquist Associate Justices John P. Stevens · Sandra Day O'Connor; Antonin Scalia · Anthony Kennedy; David Souter · Clarence Thomas; Ruth Bader Ginsburg · Stephen Breyer

Case opinion
- Majority: Breyer, joined by unanimous (parts I, II-A, II-C); Rehnquist, Stevens, O'Connor, Kennedy, Souter, Ginsburg (part II-B)

Laws applied
- 18 U.S.C. App. §2

Alabama v. Bozeman, 533 U.S. 146 (2001), was a United States Supreme Court decision involving the prosecution of someone who was already serving a criminal sentence for a different crime in a different state.

== Background ==
In circumstances where a state wants to get a person for prosecution who is held in another state, they would file a detainer. That is a legal document telling the other state where the person is imprisoned and to produce him for trial later on in the prosecuting state. An interstate compact, which was joined by the Federal Government among almost all other states, set forth procedures as to how this process was to be done. The case concerned a specific provision which says that once the prisoner arrives in the receiving state, he must be tried within 120 days. Otherwise, the case must be dismissed. The federal government sent Michael Bozeman to Alabama to face charges there. After court preliminaries, the next day he was returned to federal prison and then brought back to Alabama for trial. The trial judge rejected a petition to dismiss the charges for a violation of the Interstate Compact and a divided Alabama Supreme Court reversed.

== Opinion of the Court ==
Justice Breyer explained the question as a simple issue of the exact language in the statute. He noted that it says that in circumstances like the present case, the indictment shall not be of any further force and it should be dismissed. Against pleas by Alabama that the question was technical and the violation small, Breyer replied that "[E]ven were we to assume for argument's sake that the Agreement exempts violations that...are de minimis...we could not say that the violation at issue here qualifies as trivial." The decision of the Alabama Supreme Court was affirmed, mandating a dismissal of the indictment against Bozeman in Alabama.

== See also ==
- Interstate compact
