= Kansas v. Colorado =

United States Supreme Court case

- Supreme Court of the United States

Argued
- Full case name: State of Kansas v. State of Colorado
- Citations: 185 U.S. 125 (1902); 206 U.S. 46 (1907); 320 U.S. 383 (1943); 514 U.S. 673 (1995); 533 U.S. 1 (2001); 543 U.S. 86 (2004); 556 U.S. 98 (2009)
- Prior history: Original Jurisdiction
- Argument: Oral argument

Holding
- Colorado has been using too much of the Arkansas River and so must pay interest on the judgment going back more than 20 years. Kansas gets money relief but not water.

Court membership
- (1902) Chief Justice Melville Fuller Associate Justices John M. Harlan · Horace Gray; David J. Brewer · Henry B. Brown; George Shiras Jr. · Edward D. White; Rufus W. Peckham · Joseph McKenna (1907) Chief Justice Melville Fuller Associate Justices John M. Harlan · David J. Brewer; Edward D. White · Rufus W. Peckham; Joseph McKenna · Oliver W. Holmes Jr. William R. Day · William H. Moody (1943) Chief Justice Harlan F. Stone Associate Justices Owen Roberts · Hugo Black; Stanley F. Reed · Felix Frankfurter; William O. Douglas · Frank Murphy; Robert H. Jackson · Wiley B. Rutledge (1995, 2001, 2004) Chief Justice William Rehnquist Associate Justices John P. Stevens · Sandra Day O'Connor; Antonin Scalia · Anthony Kennedy; David Souter · Clarence Thomas; Ruth Bader Ginsburg · Stephen Breyer (2009) Chief Justice John Roberts Associate Justices John P. Stevens · Antonin Scalia; Anthony Kennedy · David Souter; Clarence Thomas · Ruth Bader Ginsburg; Stephen Breyer · Samuel Alito

Kansas v. Colorado is a longstanding litigation before the Supreme Court of the United States between US states: Kansas and Colorado regarding the payment for the use of the Arkansas River. The Court has rendered numerous opinions on the case:

- Kansas v. Colorado, 185 U.S. 125 (1902)
- Kansas v. Colorado, 206 U.S. 46 (1907)
- Colorado v. Kansas, 320 U.S. 383 (1943)
- Kansas v. Colorado, 514 U.S. 673 (1995)
- Kansas v. Colorado, 533 U.S. 1 (2001)
- Kansas v. Colorado, 543 U.S. 86 (2004)
- Kansas v. Colorado, 556 U.S. 98 (2009)

When two states have a controversy between each other, the case is filed for original jurisdiction with the US Supreme Court. It is one of the very limited circumstances in which the court acts with original jurisdiction, as a trial court. In all other cases the court acts as the highest appellate court of the United States.

== 1902 ==
The issue in the case in 1902 (185 U.S. 125) was whether Colorado, as is claimed by Kansas, is taking too much of the water of the Arkansas River, making the land along the river in Kansas much less valuable due to reduced water flow. The court chose to delay making a decision until all of the facts were in evidence.

== 1907 ==
In the 1907 case (206 U.S. 46), the Supreme Court affirmed its authority to settle the dispute between the states, but at the same time dismissed Kansas's petition on other grounds. After examining over 8,000 pages of transcripts that had been produced as a result of the litigation, it found that the "perceptible injury to portions of the Arkansas valley in Kansas" was justified by "the reclamation of large areas in Colorado, transforming thousands of acres into fertile fields." The court explicitly invited Kansas to institute new proceedings if the situation worsened significantly.

== 1943 ==
In the 1943 decision (320 U.S. 383), the court found:

1. Colorado is entitled to an injunction against further prosecution of suits by Kansas against Colorado users [of the Arkansas River].
2. Kansas V. Colorado, 206 U.S. 46, made no allocation between the States of the waters of the river.
3. Kansas is not entitled on the record to an apportionment in second feet or acre feet.
4. In controversies involving the relative rights of States, the burden on the complaining State is much heavier than that generally required to be borne by private parties, and this Court will intervene only where a case is fully and clearly proved.
5. Kansas' allegations that Colorado's use has materially increased since the [1907] decision in Kansas v. Colorado, and that the increase has worked a serious detriment to the substantial interests of Kansas, are not sustained by the evidence.
6. Relief other than the restraint of further prosecution of suits by Kansas against Colorado users [of Arkansas River water] is denied to both States.

== 1985 ==
In 1985, Kansas filed suit against Colorado alleging they had overused their share of water outlined in the Arkansas River Compact. For the next 24 years, Kansas spent over $20 million and 250 days in trial to convince the US Supreme Court that Colorado violated the Arkansas River Compact. The courts found that Colorado had indeed depleted flows to Kansas through their development of groundwater pumping installed after 1949. In April 2005, Kansas was awarded $34 million in damages and $1 million in legal costs. Then in March 2009, the final document was issued, requiring the use of a hydrologic-institutional model to bring Colorado to compliance.

== 1995 ==
In the 1995 case (514 U.S. 673), the court stated

Kansas and Colorado negotiated [and Congress approved in 1949] the Arkansas River Compact to settle disputes and remove causes of future controversies over the river's waters and to equitably divide and apportion those waters and the benefits arising from the United States' construction, operation, and maintenance of John Martin Reservoir.

A special master decided that

- certain extra pumping of water in Colorado violates Article IV-D of the compact
- Kansas has failed to prove that the operation of Colorado's Winter Water Storage Program violates the Compact; and
- dismiss Kansas' claim that Colorado's failure to abide by the Trinidad Reservoir Operating Principles violates the Compact.

Kansas and Colorado both filed exceptions to the Special Master's report. The court overruled the objections and found the special master's rulings correct on these points.

== 2001 ==
In the 2001 decision (533 U.S. 1), a special master ordered Colorado to pay damages for its use of water in excess of what it was entitled to have from 1969 on. Colorado objected to the decision because in addition to monetary damages, it had to pay prejudgment interest from 1969, and Kansas objected to the settlement because it was granted an award in money rather than in water. The court sided with the special master on both points: Colorado has to pay interest on the judgment from 1969, and all Kansas gets is cash.

== 2009 ==
Kansas has filed an exception to the Special Master's Fifth and Final Report in this action concerning the Arkansas River, contending that the Special Master erred in concluding that 28 U. S. C. §1821(b), which sets the witness attendance fee for a proceeding in "any court of the United States" at $40 per day, applies to cases within this Court's original jurisdiction. This determination led to an award considerably lower than the amount that Kansas, as the prevailing party, would have received under its alternative calculation.

Held: Expert witness attendance fees that are available in cases brought under this Court's original jurisdiction shall be the same as the expert witness attendance fees that would be available in a district court under §1821(b). Kansas contends that Congress has never attempted to regulate a prevailing party's recovery of expert witness fees in a case brought under this Court's original jurisdiction, that Article III of the Constitution would not permit Congress to impose such a restriction, and thus, that the holding in Crawford Fitting Co. v. J. T. Gibbons, Inc., 482 U. S. 437 – that district courts must adhere to §1821(b)'s witness attendance fee limitations—is not relevant here. Assuming that Kansas' interpretation is correct and that this Court has discretion to determine the fees that are recoverable in original actions, it is nevertheless appropriate to follow §1821(b). Congress' decision not to permit a prevailing party in the lower courts to recover its actual witness fee expenses departs only slightly from the "American Rule," under which parties generally bear their own expenses. There is no good reason why the rule for recovering expert witness fees should differ markedly depending on whether a case is originally brought in district court or this Court. District-court cases may be no less complex than those brought originally in this Court. And while the parties in original cases may incur substantial expert costs, as happened here, the same is frequently true in lower court litigation. Thus, assuming that the matter is left entirely to this Court's discretion, the best approach is to have a uniform rule that applies in all federal cases. Pp. 3–5.

== See also ==
- New Jersey v. Delaware, another ongoing interstate dispute often heard before the Supreme Court.
