= United States v. Hatter =

- Supreme Court of the United States

Argued February 20, 2001 Decided May 21, 2001
- Full case name: United States, Petitioner v. Terry J. Hatter, Judge of the District Court for the Central District of California, et al.
- Citations: 532 U.S. 557 (more) 121 S. Ct. 1782; 149 L. Ed. 2d 820

Case history
- Prior: 203 F.3d 795 (Fed. Cir. 2000), affirmed in part, reversed in part, and remanded.

Holding
- The Compensation Clause bars the government from collecting Social Security taxes from federal judges who held office before Congress extended those taxes; Medicare taxes can be collected.

Court membership
- Chief Justice William Rehnquist Associate Justices John P. Stevens · Sandra Day O'Connor; Antonin Scalia · Anthony Kennedy; David Souter · Clarence Thomas; Ruth Bader Ginsburg · Stephen Breyer

Case opinions
- Majority: Breyer, joined by Rehnquist, Kennedy, Souter, Ginsburg
- Concur/dissent: Scalia
- Concur/dissent: Thomas
- Stevens and O'Connor took no part in the consideration or decision of the case.

United States v. Hatter, 532 U.S. 557 (2001), was a United States Supreme Court case decided in 2001. The case concerned an alleged violation of the Compensation Clause of the United States Constitution when Congress extended Medicare and Social Security taxes to federal judge salaries. Additionally, the case dealt with whether a later increase of federal judge salaries, greater than the new taxes, remedied the potential violation.

== Background ==
The Compensation Clause to the United States Constitution was written to help protect federal judges from external political pressures. There was a concern in the early United States that without such independence, the judiciary could become "dependent on" the other branches, which could skew their rulings. The question in Hatter involved this principle and other taxes Congress applied to the judiciary.

Congress extended Medicare to federal employees in 1982, including the taxes that were carried with it. Additionally, Congress required federal judges to pay into Social Security. A group of judges filed suit against both taxes, alleging a violation of the Compensation Clause of the Constitution. The Court of Federal Claims found that the judges' Medicare claims were "time barred" and that a later salary increase "cured" the Social Security tax increase violation. The group of judges appealed to the Supreme Court, who agreed to review the decision.

== Opinion of the Court ==
Justice Breyer wrote the majority opinion for the Court, joined by Chief Justice Rehnquist and Justices Kennedy, Souter, and Ginsburg.

The opinion argued that the Social Security tax application was problematic as it "singled out then-sitting federal judges for unfavorable treatment". The determination that the Social Security tax was unconstitutional became the first instance in which the Court invalidated legislation as a discriminatory reduction of compensation. However, the Medicare tax was proper as it was not "discriminatory". The fact that one of the taxes was just a tax of "general application" meant that it could also apply to judges.

The rule that came out of these decisions was that any "direct" reduction of judicial salaries is unconstitutional "whether or not the reduction is targeted at judges". The chances however that Congress would impose a "discriminatory" tax just on judges in the future are small, and thus the effect of this decision may not be that broad. The Court refused to hear cases after Hatter which dealt with cost-of-living salary changes.

Justices Stevens and O'Connor recused themselves from participation in the case.

=== Concurring/Dissenting opinions ===
==== Scalia's dissent ====
Justice Scalia wrote an opinion concurring in part and dissenting in part. He agreed with the majority that the Social Security tax was unconstitutional but went farther and said the Medicare tax was "also unconstitutional". He noted the unique nature of compensation rules in relation to the judiciary, which unlike other federal employees except the President, cannot be diminished during their time of service.

==== Thomas' dissent ====
Justice Thomas too wrote an opinion concurring in part and dissenting in part. In a two sentence statement, he simply said he would "affirm the judgment of the Court of Appeals in its entirety". His basis was an older case, Evans v. Gore, 253 U.S. 245 (1920). Evans dealt with the application of federal income tax laws to the executive and judiciary. However, the Supreme Court functionally overruled Evans on the 'net reduction' standard.
