= Lorillard Tobacco Co. v. Reilly =

Lorillard v. Reilly
- Supreme Court of the United States

Argued April 25, 2001 Decided June 28, 2001
- Full case name: Lorillard Tobacco Company, et al. v. Thomas F. Reilly, Attorney General of Massachusetts, et al.; Altadis U.S.A. Inc., etc., et al. v. Thomas F. Reilly, Attorney General of Massachusetts, et al.
- Citations: 533 U.S. 525 (more) 121 S. Ct. 2404; 150 L. Ed. 2d 532; 2001 U.S. LEXIS 4911; 69 U.S.L.W. 4582; 29 Media L. Rep. 2121; 2001 Cal. Daily Op. Service 5421; 2001 Daily Journal DAR 6699; 2001 Colo. J. C.A.R. 3333; 14 Fla. L. Weekly Fed. S 470

Case history
- Prior: 218 F.3d 30 (1st Cir. 2000)

Holding
- Regulation on tobacco advertising struck down as overly broad

Court membership
- Chief Justice William Rehnquist Associate Justices John P. Stevens · Sandra Day O'Connor; Antonin Scalia · Anthony Kennedy; David Souter · Clarence Thomas; Ruth Bader Ginsburg · Stephen Breyer

Case opinions
- Majority: O'Connor, joined by Unanimous (Parts I, II-C, and II-D); Rehnquist, Scalia, Kennedy, Souter, Thomas (Parts III-A, III-C, and III-D); Rehnquist, Stevens, Souter, Ginsburg, Breyer (parts Part III-B-1); Rehnquist, Scalia, Kennedy, Thomas (Parts II-A, II-B, III-B-2, and IV)
- Concurrence: Kennedy, joined by Scalia
- Concurrence: Thomas
- Concur/dissent: Souter
- Concur/dissent: Stevens, joined by Souter (Part I), Ginsburg, Breyer

Laws applied
- U.S. Const., Amends. I and XIV

Lorillard v. Reilly, 533 U.S. 525 (2001), was a 2001 United States Supreme Court case brought by Lorillard Tobacco Company when Massachusetts instituted a ban on tobacco ads and sales of tobacco within 1,000 feet (300 m) of schools and playgrounds. Lorillard argued that this was an infringement on its First Amendment rights and that the regulation was more extensive than necessary. Applying the Central Hudson Test, the U.S. Supreme Court held that Massachusetts' ban on advertising and tobacco sales was overbroad. The Supreme Court also held that the Massachusetts regulation was preempted by federal law.

== See also ==
- Commercial speech
  - Bigelow v. Commonwealth of Virginia, 421 U.S. 809 (1974)
  - Bates v. State Bar of Arizona, 433 U.S. 350 (1977)
  - Linmark Associates, Inc., v. Township of Willingboro, 431 U.S. 85 (1977)
  - Central Hudson Gas & Electric Corp. v. Public Service Commission, 447 U.S. 557 (1980)
  - Posadas de Puerto Rico Associates v. Tourism Company of Puerto Rico, 478 U.S. 328 (1986)
- List of United States Supreme Court cases
  - List of United States Supreme Court cases, volume 533
