= List of United States Supreme Court cases, volume 303 =

Supreme Court of the United States
- Interactive map of Supreme Court of the United States
- 38°53′26″N 77°00′16″W
- Established: March 4, 1789; 236 years ago
- Location: Washington, D.C.
- Coordinates: 38°53′26″N 77°00′16″W
- Composition method: Presidential nomination with Senate confirmation
- Authorised by: Constitution of the United States, Art. III, § 1
- Judge term length: life tenure, subject to impeachment and removal
- Number of positions: 9 (by statute)
- Website: supremecourt.gov

This is a list of cases reported in volume 303 of United States Reports, decided by the Supreme Court of the United States in 1938.

== Justices of the Supreme Court at the time of volume 303 U.S. ==
The Supreme Court is established by Article III, Section 1 of the Constitution of the United States, which says: "The judicial Power of the United States, shall be vested in one supreme Court . . .". The size of the Court is not specified; the Constitution leaves it to Congress to set the number of justices. Under the Judiciary Act of 1789 Congress originally fixed the number of justices at six (one chief justice and five associate justices). Since 1789 Congress has varied the size of the Court from six to seven, nine, ten, and back to nine justices (always including one chief justice).

When the cases in volume 303 were decided the Court comprised the following nine members:

| Portrait | Justice | Office | Home State | Succeeded | Date confirmed by the Senate (Vote) | Tenure on Supreme Court |
|---|---|---|---|---|---|---|
| | Charles Evans Hughes | Chief Justice | New York | William Howard Taft | February 13, 1930 (52–26) | February 24, 1930 – June 30, 1941 (Retired) |
| | James Clark McReynolds | Associate Justice | Tennessee | Horace Harmon Lurton | August 29, 1914 (44–6) | October 12, 1914 – January 31, 1941 (Retired) |
| | Louis Brandeis | Associate Justice | Massachusetts | Joseph Rucker Lamar | June 1, 1916 (47–22) | June 5, 1916 – February 13, 1939 (Retired) |
| | Pierce Butler | Associate Justice | Minnesota | William R. Day | December 21, 1922 (61–8) | January 2, 1923 – November 16, 1939 (Died) |
| | Harlan F. Stone | Associate Justice | New York | Joseph McKenna | February 5, 1925 (71–6) | March 2, 1925 – July 2, 1941 (Continued as chief justice) |
| | Owen Roberts | Associate Justice | Pennsylvania | Edward Terry Sanford | May 20, 1930 (Acclamation) | June 2, 1930 – July 31, 1945 (Resigned) |
| | Benjamin N. Cardozo | Associate Justice | New York | Oliver Wendell Holmes Jr. | February 24, 1932 (Acclamation) | March 14, 1932 – July 9, 1938 (Died) |
| | Hugo Black | Associate Justice | Alabama | Willis Van Devanter | August 17, 1937 (63–16) | August 19, 1937 – September 17, 1971 (Retired) |
| | Stanley Forman Reed | Associate Justice | Kentucky | George Sutherland | January 25, 1938 (Acclamation) | January 31, 1938 – February 25, 1957 (Retired) |

== Notable Cases in 303 U.S. ==
=== Electric Bond and Share Company v. Securities and Exchange Commission ===
In Electric Bond and Share Company v. Securities and Exchange Commission, 303 U.S. 419 (1938), the Supreme Court ruled in favor of the Securities and Exchange Commission (SEC) in a constitutional dispute between the Electric Bond and Share Company and the SEC over the Public Utility Holding Company Act of 1935. The Act gave the SEC authority to regulate electric companies nationwide, and to enforce its rules. It required all companies selling gas and electricity in the United States to register with the SEC, and restricted holding companies to one or two tiers of subsidiaries. The Act also gave the SEC the power to limit holding companies to a geographic area so that individual states could regulate them.

=== Lovell v. City of Griffin ===
Lovell v. City of Griffin, 303 U.S. 444 (1938), related to the requirement of persons to seek government permission to distribute religious material. The Supreme Court ruled it was not constitutional for a city to require such consent; the city ordinance was unconstitutionally overbroad. Because the ordinance restricted not merely the time, place, or manner of the materials distributed, the Court ruled it violated the First Amendment and, by extension, the Fourteenth Amendment, which guaranteed that the federal constitutional guarantees would be binding on individual states.

=== New Negro Alliance v. Sanitary Grocery Company ===
New Negro Alliance v. Sanitary Grocery Company, 303 U.S. 552 (1938), is a landmark decision of the Supreme Court which affects US labor law, safeguarding a right to boycott, and relating to the struggle by African Americans against discriminatory hiring practices. The Court concluded that "peaceful and orderly dissemination of information by those defined as persons interested in a labor dispute concerning 'terms and conditions of employment' in an industry or a plant or a place of business should be lawful".

=== Hale v. Kentucky ===
In Hale v. Kentucky, 303 U.S. 613 (1938), the Supreme Court overturned the conviction of an African American man accused of murder, because the lower court of Kentucky had systematically excluded African Americans from serving on the jury in the case.

== Federal court system ==
Under the Judiciary Act of 1789 the federal court structure at the time comprised District Courts, which had general trial jurisdiction; Circuit Courts, which had mixed trial and appellate (from the US District Courts) jurisdiction; and the United States Supreme Court, which had appellate jurisdiction over the federal District and Circuit courts—and for certain issues over state courts. The Supreme Court also had limited original jurisdiction (i.e., in which cases could be filed directly with the Supreme Court without first having been heard by a lower federal or state court). There were one or more federal District Courts and/or Circuit Courts in each state, territory, or other geographical region.

The Judiciary Act of 1891 created the United States Courts of Appeals and reassigned the jurisdiction of most routine appeals from the district and circuit courts to these appellate courts. The Act created nine new courts that were originally known as the "United States Circuit Courts of Appeals." The new courts had jurisdiction over most appeals of lower court decisions. The Supreme Court could review either legal issues that a court of appeals certified or decisions of court of appeals by writ of certiorari. On January 1, 1912, the effective date of the Judicial Code of 1911, the old Circuit Courts were abolished, with their remaining trial court jurisdiction transferred to the U.S. District Courts.

== List of cases in volume 303 U.S. ==
| Case name | Citation | Opinion of the Court | Vote | Concurring opinion or statement | Dissenting opinion or statement | Procedural jurisdiction | Result |
|---|---|---|---|---|---|---|---|
| Kay v. United States | 303 U.S. 1 (1938) | Hughes | 8-0[a] | none | none | certiorari to the United States Court of Appeals for the Second Circuit (2d Cir.) | vacated |
| Brady v. Terminal Railroad Association | 303 U.S. 10 (1938) | Hughes | 8-0[a] | none | none | certiorari to the Missouri Supreme Court (Mo.) | reversed |
| Henneford v. Northern Pacific Railroad Company | 303 U.S. 17 (1938) | per curiam | 8-0[a] | none | none | appeal from the United States District Court for the Eastern District of Washington (E.D. Wash.) | reversed |
| Atkinson v. State Tax Commission of Oregon | 303 U.S. 20 (1938) | per curiam | 8-0[a] | none | none | appeal from the Oregon Supreme Court (Or.) | affirmed |
| United States v. Esnault-Pelterie | 303 U.S. 26 (1938) | per curiam | 7-1[a] | none | Black (short statement) | certiorari to the United States Court of Claims (Ct. Cl.) | affirmed |
| Lonergan v. United States | 303 U.S. 33 (1938) | McReynolds | 8-0[a] | none | none | certiorari to the United States Court of Appeals for the Ninth Circuit (9th Cir.) | reversed |
| Munro v. United States | 303 U.S. 36 (1938) | McReynolds | 8-0[a] | none | none | certiorari to the United States Court of Appeals for the Second Circuit (2d Cir.) | affirmed |
| Myers v. Bethlehem Shipbuilding Corporation | 303 U.S. 41 (1938) | Brandeis | 8-0[a] | none | none | certiorari to the United States Court of Appeals for the First Circuit (1st Cir.) | reversed |
| Newport News Shipbuilding and Dry Dock Company v. Schauffler | 303 U.S. 54 (1938) | Brandeis | 8-0[a] | none | none | certiorari to the United States Court of Appeals for the Fourth Circuit (4th Cir.) | affirmed |
| Adam v. Saenger | 303 U.S. 59 (1938) | Stone | 8-0[a] | Black (without opinion) | none | certiorari to the Texas Court of Civil Appeals (Tex. Ct. Civ. App.) | reversed |
| Compania Espanola De Navegacion Maritima, SA v. The Navemar | 303 U.S. 68 (1938) | Stone | 8-0[a] | none | none | certiorari to the United States Court of Appeals for the Second Circuit (2d Cir.) | reversed |
| Connecticut General Life Insurance Company v. Johnson, Treasurer of California | 303 U.S. 77 (1938) | Stone | 7-1[a] | none | Black (opinion) | appeal from the California Supreme Court (Cal.) | reversed |
| Blackton v. Gordon | 303 U.S. 91 (1938) | Roberts | 8-0[a] | none | none | certiorari to the New Jersey Court of Errors and Appeals (N.J.) | affirmed |
| Indiana ex rel. Anderson v. Brand | 303 U.S. 95 (1938) | Roberts | 7-1[a] | none | Black (opinion) | certiorari to the Indiana Supreme Court (Ind.) | reversed |
| Foster v. United States | 303 U.S. 118 (1938) | Black | 8-0[a] | none | none | certiorari to the United States Court of Claims (Ct. Cl.) | affirmed |
| United Gas Public Service Company v. Texas | 303 U.S. 123 (1938) | Hughes | 6-2[b] | Black (opinion) | McReynolds (opinion; joined by Butler) | certiorari to the Texas Court of Civil Appeals (Tex. Ct. Civ. App.) | affirmed |
| New York ex rel. Consolidated Water Company v. Maltbie | 303 U.S. 158 (1938) | per curiam | 8-0[a] | none | none | appeal from the New York Supreme Court (N.Y. Sup. Ct.) | dismissed |
| New York Life Insurance Company v. Gamer | 303 U.S. 161 (1938) | Butler | 6-1[a][b] | none | Black (opinion) | certiorari to the United States Court of Appeals for the Ninth Circuit (9th Cir.) | reversed |
| South Carolina Highway Department v. Barnwell Brothers, Inc. | 303 U.S. 177 (1938) | Stone | 7-0[a][b] | none | none | appeal from the United States District Court for the Eastern District of South Carolina (E.D.S.C.) | reversed |
| Maty v. Grasselli Chemical Company | 303 U.S. 197 (1938) | Black | 8-0[a] | none | none | certiorari to the United States Court of Appeals for the Third Circuit (3d Cir.) | reversed |
| Mookini v. United States | 303 U.S. 201 (1938) | Hughes | 8-0[a] | none | none | certiorari to the United States Court of Appeals for the Ninth Circuit (9th Cir.) | reversed |
| Southwestern Bell Telephone Company v. Oklahoma | 303 U.S. 206 (1938) | per curiam | 8-0[a] | none | none | appeal from the Oklahoma Supreme Court (Okla.) | dismissed |
| Century Indemnity Company v. Nelson | 303 U.S. 213 (1938) | McReynolds | 8-0[a] | none | none | certiorari to the United States Court of Appeals for the Ninth Circuit (9th Cir.) | reversed |
| Helvering, Commissioner of Internal Revenue v. Therrell | 303 U.S. 218 (1938) | McReynolds | 7-0[a][b] | none | none | certiorari to the United States Court of Appeals for the Fifth Circuit (5th Cir.) | affirmed (one case); reversed (three cases) |
| United States v. Griffin | 303 U.S. 226 (1938) | Brandeis | 7-0[a][b] | Black (without opinion) | none | appeal from the United States District Court for the Southern District of Georgia (S.D. Ga.) | reversed |
| United States v. Illinois Central Railroad Company | 303 U.S. 239 (1938) | Butler | 7-0[a][b] | none | none | certiorari to the United States Court of Appeals for the Fifth Circuit (5th Cir.) | reversed |
| McCollum v. Hamilton National Bank | 303 U.S. 245 (1938) | Butler | 8-0[a] | none | none | certiorari to the Tennessee Supreme Court (Tenn.) | reversed |
| Western Live Stock v. Bureau of Revenue | 303 U.S. 250 (1938) | Stone | 6-2[a] | none | McReynolds and Butler | appeal from the New Mexico Supreme Court (N.M.) | affirmed |
| National Labor Relations Board v. Pennsylvania Greyhound Lines, Inc. | 303 U.S. 261 (1938) | Stone | 7-0[a][b] | none | none | certiorari to the United States Court of Appeals for the Third Circuit (3d Cir.) | reversed |
| National Labor Relations Board v. Pacific Greyhound Lines, Inc. | 303 U.S. 272 (1938) | Stone | 7-0[a][b] | none | none | certiorari to the United States Court of Appeals for the Ninth Circuit (9th Cir.) | reversed |
| United States v. Klein, Escheator of Pennsylvania | 303 U.S. 276 (1938) | Stone | 7-0[a][b] | none | none | appeal from the Pennsylvania Supreme Court (Pa.) | affirmed |
| St. Paul Mercury Indemnity Company v. Red Cab Company | 303 U.S. 283 (1938) | Roberts | 7-0[a][b] | none | none | certiorari to the United States Court of Appeals for the Seventh Circuit (7th Cir.) | reversed |
| Helvering, Commissioner of Internal Revenue v. Bullard | 303 U.S. 297 (1938) | Roberts | 7-0[a][b] | none | none | certiorari to the United States Court of Appeals for the Seventh Circuit (7th Cir.) | reversed |
| Hassett v. Welch | 303 U.S. 303 (1938) | Roberts | 7-0[a][b] | none | none | certiorari to the United States Court of Appeals for the First Circuit (1st Cir.) | affirmed |
| Escanaba and Lake Superior Railroad Company v. United States | 303 U.S. 315 (1938) | Roberts | 8-0[a] | none | none | appeal from the United States District Court for the Western District of Michigan (W.D. Mich.) | affirmed |
| Lauf v. E.G. Shinner and Company | 303 U.S. 323 (1938) | Roberts | 5-2[a][b] | none | Butler (opinion; with which McReynolds concurred) | certiorari to the United States Court of Appeals for the Seventh Circuit (7th Cir.) | reversed |
| United States v. Patryas | 303 U.S. 341 (1938) | Black | 7-0[a][b] | none | none | certiorari to the United States Court of Appeals for the Seventh Circuit (7th Cir.) | affirmed |
| Adair v. Bank of America National Trust and Savings Association | 303 U.S. 350 (1938) | Reed | 8-0[a] | McReynolds (without opinion) | none | certiorari to the United States Court of Appeals for the Ninth Circuit (9th Cir.) | reversed |
| Helvering, Commissioner of Internal Revenue v. Bankline Oil Company | 303 U.S. 362 (1938) | Hughes | 7-0[a][b] | McReynolds and Butler (without opinion) | none | certiorari to the United States Court of Appeals for the Ninth Circuit (9th Cir.) | affirmed |
| Helvering, Commissioner of Internal Revenue v. O'Donnell | 303 U.S. 370 (1938) | Hughes | 7-0[a][b] | none | none | certiorari to the United States Court of Appeals for the Ninth Circuit (9th Cir.) | reversed |
| Helvering, Commissioner of Internal Revenue v. Elbe Oil Land Development Company | 303 U.S. 372 (1938) | Hughes | 7-0[a][b] | none | none | certiorari to the United States Court of Appeals for the Ninth Circuit (9th Cir.) | reversed |
| Helvering, Commissioner of Internal Revenue v. Mountain Producers Corporation | 303 U.S. 376 (1938) | Hughes | 5-2[a][b] | none | Butler (opinion; with which McReynolds concurred) | certiorari to the United States Court of Appeals for the Tenth Circuit (10th Cir.) | reversed |
| Helvering, Commissioner of Internal Revenue v. Mitchell | 303 U.S. 391 (1938) | Brandeis | 6-1[a][b] | none | McReynolds (without opinion) | certiorari to the United States Court of Appeals for the Second Circuit (2d Cir.) | reversed |
| Ticonic National Bank v. Sprague | 303 U.S. 406 (1938) | Reed | 8-0[a] | none | none | certiorari to the United States Court of Appeals for the First Circuit (1st Cir.) | affirmed |
| United States v. Wurts | 303 U.S. 414 (1938) | Black | 7-0[a][b] | none | none | certiorari to the United States Court of Appeals for the Third Circuit (3d Cir.) | reversed |
| Electric Bond and Share Company v. Securities and Exchange Commission | 303 U.S. 419 (1938) | Hughes | 6-1[a][b] | none | McReynolds (without opinion) | certiorari to the United States Court of Appeals for the Second Circuit (2d Cir.) | affirmed |
| Lovell v. City of Griffin | 303 U.S. 444 (1938) | Hughes | 8-0[a] | none | none | appeal from the Georgia Court of Appeals (Ga. Ct. App.) | reversed |
| Santa Cruz Fruit Packing Company v. National Labor Relations Board | 303 U.S. 453 (1938) | Hughes | 5-2[a][b] | none | Butler (opinion; with which McReynolds concurred) | certiorari to the United States Court of Appeals for the Ninth Circuit (9th Cir.) | affirmed |
| Deitrick v. Standard Surety and Casualty Company | 303 U.S. 471 (1938) | McReynolds | 6-2[a] | none | Black (opinion; with which Reed concurred) | certiorari to the United States Court of Appeals for the First Circuit (1st Cir.) | affirmed |
| State Farm Mutual Automobile Insurance Company v. Coughran | 303 U.S. 485 (1938) | McReynolds | 8-0[a] | none | none | certiorari to the United States Court of Appeals for the Ninth Circuit (9th Cir.) | reversed |
| Guaranty Trust Company v. Commissioner of Internal Revenue | 303 U.S. 493 (1938) | Stone | 5-2[a][b] | none | McReynolds and Roberts (without opinions) | certiorari to the United States Court of Appeals for the Second Circuit (2d Cir.) | affirmed |
| United States v. O'Donnell | 303 U.S. 501 (1938) | Stone | 7-0[a][b] | none | none | certiorari to the United States Court of Appeals for the Ninth Circuit (9th Cir.) | reversed |
| Calmar Steamship Corporation v. Taylor | 303 U.S. 525 (1938) | Stone | 7-1[a] | none | Black (without opinion) | certiorari to the United States Court of Appeals for the Third Circuit (3d Cir.) | reversed |
| Adams v. Nagle | 303 U.S. 532 (1938) | Roberts | 8-0[a] | none | none | certiorari to the United States Court of Appeals for the Third Circuit (3d Cir.) | reversed |
| Lincoln Engineering Company v. Stewart-Warner Corporation | 303 U.S. 545 (1938) | Roberts | 7-0[a][c] | none | none | certiorari to the United States Court of Appeals for the Seventh Circuit (7th Cir.) | reversed |
| New Negro Alliance v. Sanitary Grocery Company | 303 U.S. 552 (1938) | Roberts | 6-2[a] | none | McReynolds (opinion; joined by Butler) | certiorari to the United States Court of Appeals for the District of Columbia (D.C. Cir.) | reversed |
| United States v. Hendler | 303 U.S. 564 (1938) | Black | 7-0[a][b] | none | none | certiorari to the United States Court of Appeals for the Fourth Circuit (4th Cir.) | reversed |
| Bates Manufacturing Company v. United States | 303 U.S. 567 (1938) | Black | 7-0[a][b] | none | none | certiorari to the United States Court of Appeals for the First Circuit (1st Cir.) | reversed |
| New York Rapid Transit Corporation v. City of New York | 303 U.S. 573 (1938) | Reed | 7-0[a][d] | none | none | appeal from the New York Supreme Court (N.Y. Sup. Ct.) | affirmed |
| Shannahan v. United States | 303 U.S. 596 (1938) | Brandeis | 8-0[a] | none | none | appeal from the United States District Court for the Northern District of Indiana (N.D. Ind.) | affirmed |
| Coverdale, Sheriff and Ex-Officio Tax Collector v. Arkansas-Louisiana Pipe Line Company | 303 U.S. 604 (1938) | Reed | 7-1[a] | none | McReynolds (without opinion) | appeal from the United States District Court for the Western District of Louisiana (W.D. La.) | reversed |
| Hale v. Kentucky | 303 U.S. 613 (1938) | per curiam | 8-0[a] | none | none | certiorari to the Kentucky Court of Appeals (Ky.) | reversed |

[a] Cardozo took no part in the case (Justice Cardozo was seriously ill of heart disease and so missed participating in these cases; he died in July 1938.)
[b] Reed took no part in the case
[c] Hughes took no part in the case
[d] Stone took no part in the case
