= Ebasco Services =

Defunct American energy construction company

- Industry: Energy
- Founded: 1905; 121 years ago
- Founder: General Electric
- Defunct: 1993
- Fate: sold to Raytheon
- Headquarters: New York City

Ebasco Services was a United States–based designer and constructor of energy infrastructure, most notably nuclear power plants.

== History ==
The company was formed from the Electric Bond and Share Company, a holding company that sold securities of electric utilities. Its headquarters were located at 2 Rector Street, New York City. It was created by General Electric in 1905. Electric Bond and Share was restructured after the Public Utility Holding Company Act of 1935, forming EBASCO Services, a provider of engineering consulting and construction services.

Following the passage of the Public Utility Holding Company Act of 1935, the U.S. Securities and Exchange Commission (SEC) oversaw the closure, re-organization or divestment of EBASCo's holding companies except for its American & Foreign Power Co., making annual reports on its monumental legal breakup case between 1936 and 1961.

Among other projects EBASCO designed nuclear power plants. By 1986, Ebasco claimed to have built 220 hydroelectric, 700 fossil fueled and 35 nuclear facilities around the world.

== Documented Acquisition History ==
1905 to 1937 Intermediate Holding Company Subsidiaries

- American Gas & Electric Company
- American Power & Light Company
- Electric Power & Light Corporation
- National Power & Light Company
- United Gas Corporation
- American & Foreign Power Company

The Securities and Exchange Commission ordered the breakup of the above Holding companies in 1937 except for the American and Foreign Power Company. SEC v. EBASCo., 18 F. Supp. 131 (S.D.N.Y. 1937

Boise Cascade acquired Ebasco in 1969. Boise Cascade then tried to sell off Ebasco's International Holdings that included the Cuba Electric Company and others in South America and China. However, it is claimed that the Cuban Electric Company's stock is now held by Staples Inc. Yet, in 1969, the U.S. Foreign Claims Settlement Commission denied the claim in its CU-4016 decision

Halliburton acquired Ebasco in 1973, but on April 24, 1973, the US District Court, Southern District of New York filed suit against Halliburton using the Clayton Act to reverse the sale.

In 1976, the Lone Star Gas Company purchased Ebasco, changing its name to Ensearch Ensearch Company History.

By the 1980s, EBASCO had these divisions: Ebasco Engineering, which provided engineering design and A/E services, Ebasco Environmental, which provided environmental engineering and science services, EBASCO Constructors, which provided construction and construction management and Ebasco Risk Managers (ERMCI) division. ERMCI became the Independent Consultation Services of Ebasco, Inc. or INDECS on January 1, 1984, About INDECS. Ebasco Environmental was sold to Enserch Environmental before being sold to Foster Wheeler, Inc., becoming Foster Wheeler Environmental.

Ebasco (EBS) was included in Dow Jones Utility Average from 1938 to 1947.

Ebasco Services was one of the major US architect-engineers, that coordinated the design of many nuclear power plants both in the US and abroad including the Fukushima Daiichi Nuclear Power Plant (units 1, 2 and 6).

EBASCO Engineering and Constructors were sold to Raytheon in 1993 and became part of a Raytheon subsidiary, United Engineers and Constructors. In 1996 Morrison-Knudsen Corp. of Boise was purchased by Washington Group International, taking the Morrison-Knudsen name until it purchased Raytheon in 2000.

During the September 11 attacks of 2001, Raytheon had an office in the South Tower of the World Trade Center on the 91st floor. Their office, being 6 floors above where United Airlines Flight 175 collided with the building, was spared from the immediate collision, but was utterly destroyed in the subsequent collapse of the South Tower.

Throughout its history of building power facilities around the world, Ebasco would issue insurance policies to each utility company for various aspects of the facility which would later include policies for issues like their extensive use of asbestos. These policies have since become major legal issues Ebasco Insurance

== Whistleblowing case ==
Nuclear whistleblower Ronald J. Goldstein was a supervisor employed by EBASCO, which was a major contractor for the construction of Houston Lighting and Power Company's South Texas Project (a complex of two nuclear power plants). In the summer of 1985, Goldstein identified safety problems to SAFETEAM, an internal compliance program established by EBASCO and Houston Lighting, including noncompliance with safety procedures, the failure to issue safety compliance reports, and quality control violations affecting the safety of the plant.

SAFETEAM was promoted as an independent safe haven for employees to voice their safety concerns. The two companies did not inform their employees that they did not believe complaints reported to SAFETEAM had any legal protection. After he filed his report to SAFETEAM, Goldstein was fired. Subsequently, Golstein filed suit under federal nuclear whistleblower statutes.

The U.S. Department of Labor ruled that his submissions to SAFETEAM were protected and his dismissal was invalid, a finding upheld by Labor Secretary Lynn Martin. The ruling was appealed and overturned by the Fifth Circuit Court of Appeals, which ruled that private programs offered no protection to whistleblowers. After Goldstein lost his case, Congress amended the federal nuclear whistleblower law to provide protection reports made to internal systems and prevent retaliation against whistleblowers.
