= Howard C. Hopson =

American businessman

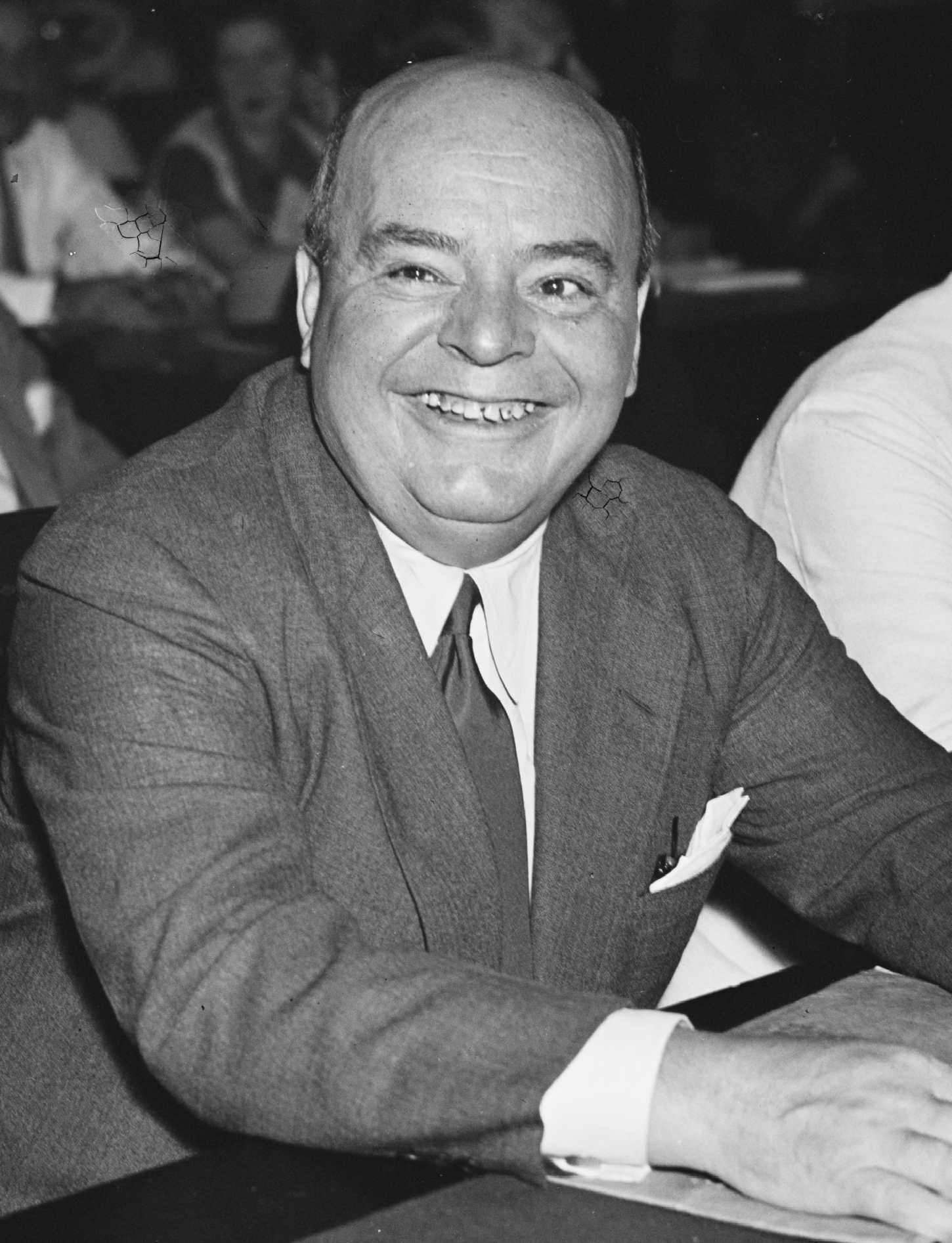
- Hopson in 1935
- Born: May 8, 1882
- Died: December 22, 1949 (aged 67)

Howard Colwell Hopson (May 8, 1882 – December 22, 1949) was an American businessman who was convicted of defrauding Americans of more than $20 million (roughly 385 million dollars in 2025). Hopson built his company, Associated Gas and Electric (AG&E) into one of the largest electricity providing companies of the era. At its peak, AG&E was the country's third largest provider of electricity, and the fifth largest holding company.

Born in 1882, Hopson went to the University of Wisconsin and George Washington University. After being hired by both the Interstate Commerce Commission and New York Public Service Commission, he struck out on his own and opened a consulting company. In the late 1910s, Hopson purchased a controlling interest in Associated Gas and Electric, and would grow it into multi international company serving 2 million people. In the late 1930s, Hopson was discovered to have stolen $20 million from the company and sentenced to years in prison. He was released in 1943, and died in 1949.

Hopson quickly became a figurehead of robber barons and corruption, and his example led directly to the passing of the Public Utility Holding Company Act of 1935, Securities Act of 1933, and the Securities Exchange Act of 1934.

== Early life ==
Hopson was born in 1882 in Fort Atkinson, Wisconsin, the son of a nursery salesman (Edgar Delos Hopson (December 16, 1851 – June 11, 1913), and Mary Colwell (November 28, 1856- November 14, 1930). (Note: He was a direct descendant of William Leete) In his early years, Hopson worked in a brick and wire factory, sold newspapers, and edited a country newspaper. He attended the University of Wisconsin, studying under Richard T. Ely and working as an assistant to John R. Commons, in 1901, and got a master's degree at George Washington University. Hopson served as the assistant editor of the Jefferson County Union, a local newspaper. In 1907, he was hired by the Interstate Commerce Commission. The following year, Hopson gained a law degree, and his M.A. in 1910, being admitted to serve before the Supreme Court three years later. He married Elenore Evans of West Winfield and Utica, New York on August 5, 1921. She later in 1922 committed suicide by jumping out of an apartment.

On October 26, 1908 the New York Public Service Commission hired Hopson as a secretary of the President, five years later placing him as its head of Division of Capitalization. From 1908 to 1915, he was one of the key men in New York public utility regulation. Later in his life, Hopson was known to boast that "the only laws he couldn't get around were the ones he himself wrote." It was later alleged that Hopson's rise in the Public Service Commission was due to his friendship with John Dix and the former chairman of the commission. By then recognized as one of the foremost experts in public utilities, Hopson left the Public Service Commission in 1915, to open a consulting business (H.C. Hopson and Company) at 61 Broadway in New York City. His company handled the business of American Telephone & Telegraph, The Consolidated Gas Company of New York, and the Electric Bond and Share Company. (Note: His first customer was J.G. White and Company, then employers of J.I. White) By 1921, Hopson was earning $100,000 a year.

== Associated Gas and Electric ==
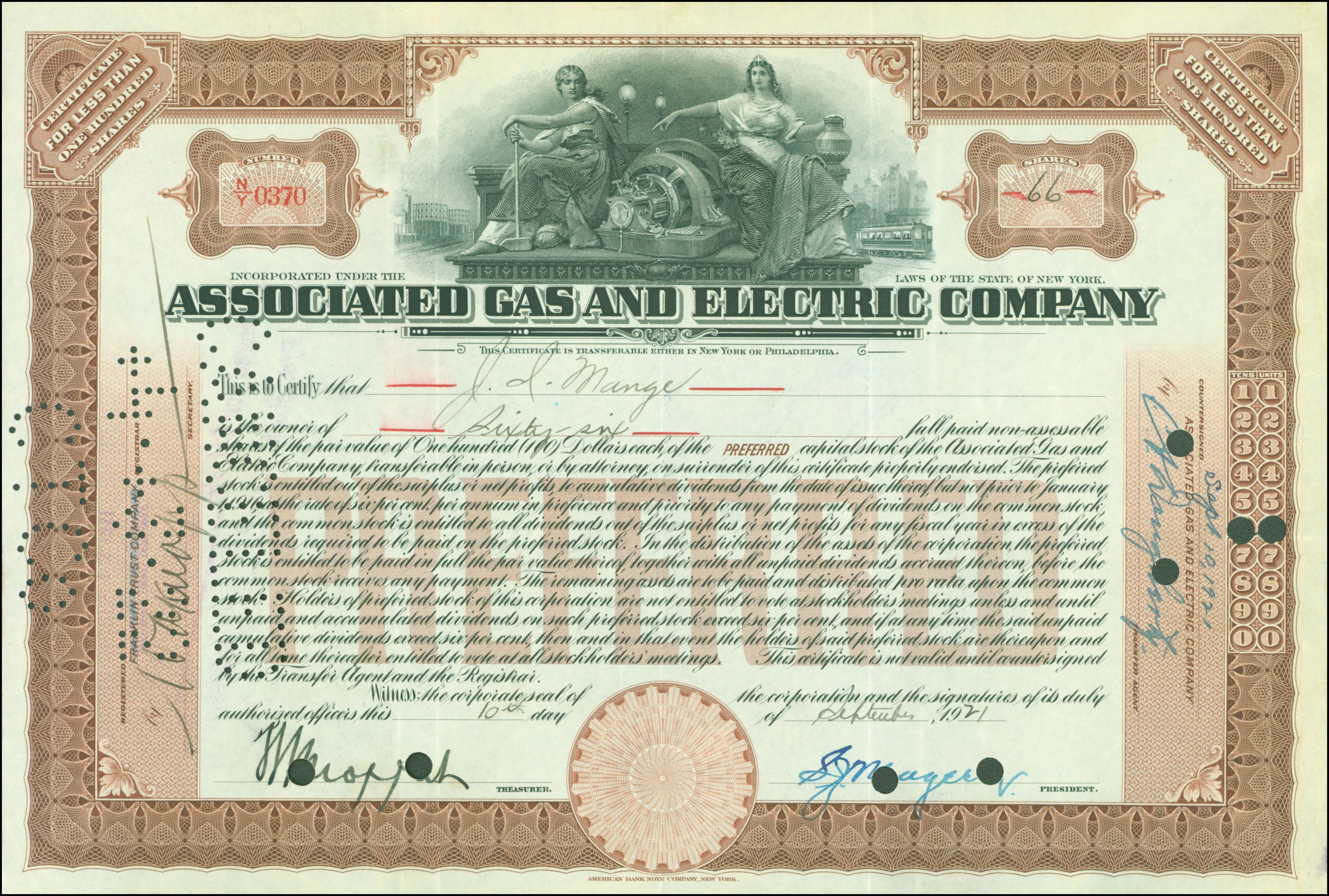
Preferred share of the Associated Gas and Electric Company, issued 10. October 1921

Hopson purchased, with John I. Mange, the Associated Gas and Electric Company of New York for $298,318.19. (Note: Hopson and Mange organized two companies to carry out the take over. The companies were 'Associated Utilities Corporation' and the Public Utility Investment Corporation. In March the first company bought from the J. G. White Corporation of which Mange was vice-president 5,979 shares of $100 per common stock- in Associated Gas and Electric for $48 a share. Associated Utilities borrowed $71,748 as a part payment from the other Hopson-Mange company. The latter company had in turn borrowed this sum from banks. Later they acquired the 21 remaining shares of stock through Associated Securities Corporation, organized in November of 1922 by Hopson and Mange. They gave $1000 for which they received 10 shares of the companies stock. Then they gave the company an option on the shares of Associated Gas and Electric held by Associated Utilities and received in return the remaining 990 shares of stock in Associated Securities. Later Associated Securities exercised its option, thus gaining control of Associated Gas and Electric. However, Hopkins and Mange later placed control of Associated Securities in Associated Gas & Electric properties, a Massachusetts trust, formed June 1, 1924. In all, they made about $216,000 on the deal.) At the time, the company served 44,000 clients and had 3.5 million dollars in earnings. American Gas and Electric was a holding company organized in 1906 that owned several other gas companies.

Ithaca Gas Light company was founded in 1852. It supplied gas to 28 customers, was formed with a capital of $75,000. It became AG&E on March 19, 1906, through the efforts of William T. Morris. At the time, it was composed of 14 different companies, with a total value of $1.2 million. By 1914, those 14 companies were consolidated to four, and eventually they were united under the New York State Gas and electric corporation. Several other companies both in upstate New York, Kentucky, and Tennessee made up AG&E's portfolio. When Hopson purchased a controlling interest in AG&E, he immediately began buying up more companies, expanding into Massachusetts, New Hampshire, Maine, Maryland, Pennsylvania, and the Philippines. In the 1930s, the assets of American Gas and Electric were well over $1 billion, and they had revenues of $133 million. They served 1.75 million customers in 6,000 communities. At its peak, AG&E was made up of over 250 corporations (sometimes placed as high as 522, and occasionally as high as "5,800 names") providing electricity, steam, ice, water, and transportation in 26 states, Canada, and the Philippines to 20 million people.

Eventually, it became the nation's third largest electricity producer, producing 9% of the United States' electricity, behind J. P. Morgan's United Corporation (23%), and Samuel Insull's various holding companies (11%). In addition, AG&E became one of the top five largest holding companies. The stock of AG&E peaked at $61 a share, and about 500,000 people invested over $1 billion in the company.

== Scandal ==
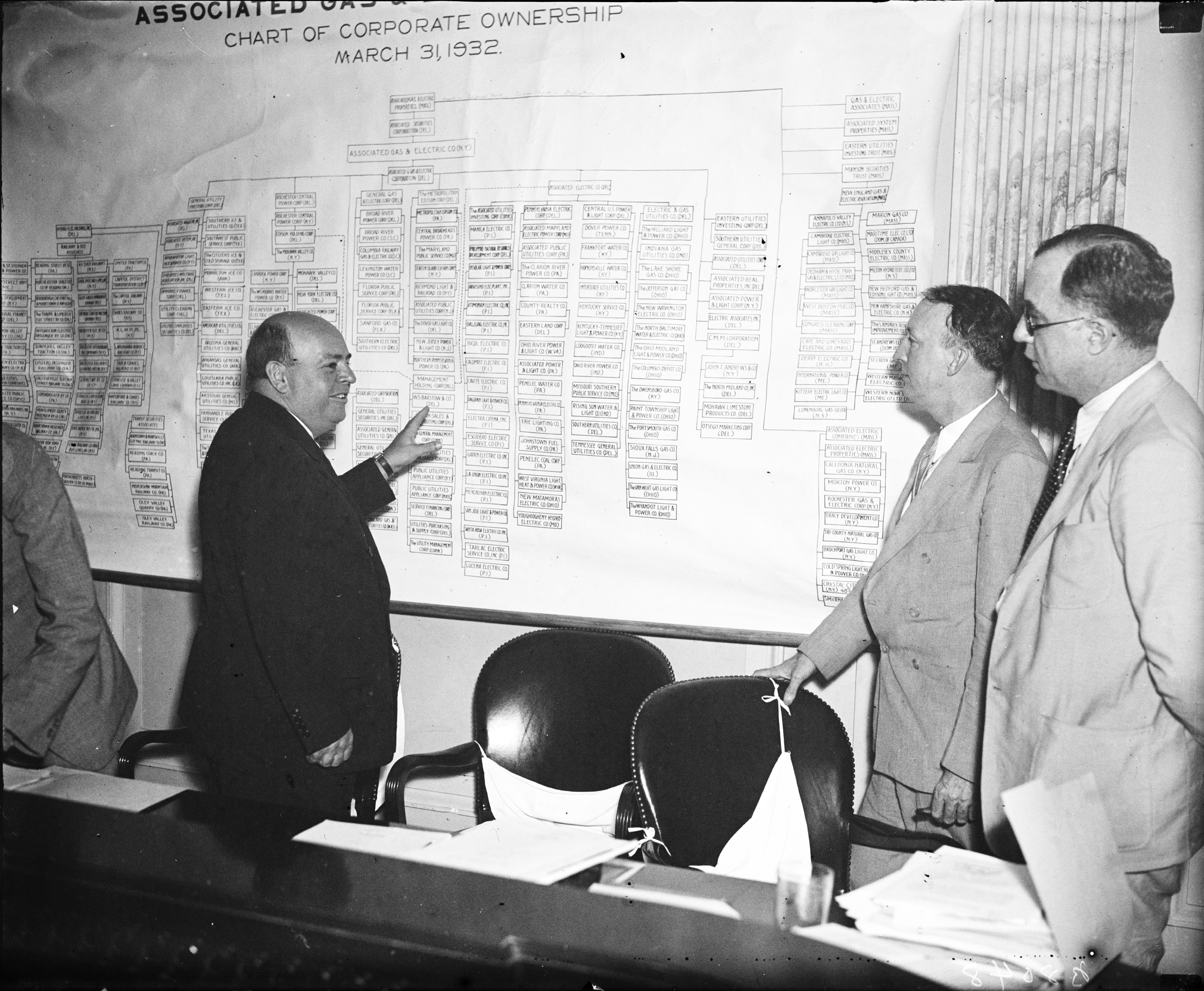
Hopson explaining the set-up of AG&E, 1935

In 1935, senator Hugo Black began investigating multiple utility companies who may have influenced the vote on the Wheeler-Rayburn Act. The bill, which would have imposed a 'death sentence' on holding companies (unless they could justify their existence), was heavily opposed by members of the Committee of American Utility Executives, who sent about 97,000 telegrams to members of the house in the days preceding the vote on the bill.

Only one thing ... can produce a law with the Senate's narrowly imposed "death sentence", and that is largely in the hands of the investigating committees of the Senate and House. If scandals can be laid to the utility lobbyists the House will stampede for cover, and its conferees will quickly reflect the change.

— Arthur Krock

The investigation began studying large propaganda campaigns that had occurred beginning in 1919. A study undertaken by the Federal Trade Commission in 1934 stated that "measured by quantity, extent, and cost, this was probably the greatest peace-time propaganda campaign ever conducted by private interests in this country." Black uncovered 250,000 telegrams, many of which were forged. Uncovered by Denis J. Driscoll, the investigators were clued into the forgery by the high prevalence of last names in the beginning of the alphabet, with B's making up 14% of the total. The forgery was discovered when a Western Union operator testified that "During the time the bill was between the House and the Senate, Mr. Herron [an official of Utilities Investing Corporation, which itself was a subsidiary of A. G. & E., a prominent holding company] would come in almost daily for a period of an hour... or two ... and he would dictate these messages to me and the signatures, and his signatures were obtained from a list which he had in his hand, or from the city directory." Signatures were also gained by bribing messenger boys, with them often being paid 3 cents per signature. The corporations paid for many lobbyists, and oftentimes bought controlling interests in newspapers, or dropped them from their advertising list.

In August 1935, Hopson admitted to attempting to change the policy of major newspapers. He threatened to drop advertising from The New York Times, the Hearst companies, Scripps Howard and many local papers as well. Hopson also sued newspapers for libel, including suing the Atlantic Monthly, The New Republic, and Survey Graphic.

It was found that AG&E had spent $875,531.95 on lobbying, (Note: It was later said by Hopkin to have been over a million dollars.) and furthermore had not paid out dividends in several years. It was revealed that, though AG&E ended cash and stock dividends in 1931-32, the income of Hopson was above $500,000 every year from 1922 to 1933. In 1935, Hopson was subpoenaed, and did not show up, leading to a nationwide 'Hopson Hunt'.

Eliza crossing the ice, hotly pursued by bloodhounds, had nothing on Howard C. Hopson, Through the corridors of leading Washington hotels, over the rolling meadows of near-by Virginia, through the highways and byways of adjacent Maryland, troops of Congressional agents, G men, police, and assorted sleuths sniffed excitedly on the trail of the elusive utility baron.

— Robert S. Allen, Washington correspondent of the Philadelphia Record.

When Hopson was finally brought to court, the two chambers of Congress came into disagreement about who would get to question him. "the controversy between the committees of the House and Senate is child's play that is a representative of Congress." the Atlanta Constitution reported. They later compromised on both 'sharing' the questioning.

AG&E and Hopson's examples led the Public Utility Holding Company Act of 1935 to be passed. In the years following, AG&E (in a desperate attempt to avoid being broken up) consolidated, planning to bring the number of companies they owned down to 60 companies. In 1938, Hopson retired, taking an additional $18.7 million in bonds and billing himself for providing services to his companies.

Wallowing in massive amounts of debt, (Note: Fortune later calculated that AG&E had $493 million in debt, on $120 million of solid assets) on January 10, 1940, Associated Gas & Electric filed for bankruptcy. In the insolvency that followed, states and local communities filed nearly 400 lawsuits against the company. In November 1940 shareholders charged Hopson with fraud (the charges were for a total of 85 years in prison). On January 9, 1940, he was found guilty and sentenced to five years in prison on 17 counts of mail fraud by Alfred Conkling Coxe Jr., (Note: The fraud was judged to have been Hopkins "$68 million convertible debenture issue of 1728, the sale of management services at unreasonable rates, and the charging of huge legal fees") and an additional two for income tax evasion. (Note: On February 8, federal agents filed Income tax liens totaling $2,664,954 against Hopson and his family.) Hopson, at the time nearly insane from the effects of tertiary syphilis went to federal prison, in Lewisberry, Pennsylvania.

In the bankruptcy of Associated Gas & Electric, Denis J. Driscoll and William Thorp were appointed to deal with the settlement and break up/reorganization of the company. In approving the reorganization, the SEC stated that AG&E was simply "media for a gigantic scheme to hinder, delay and defraud." The direct descendant of AG&E was the General Public Utilities corporation, and the New York State Gas and Electric Company. Other companies spun off include the Canadian Power Corporation, and Rochester Gas and Electric. Several other companies formed from AG&E are Metropolitan Edison Company, Pennsylvania Electric Company, Jersey Central Power & Light, today all part of FirstEnergy. The shareholders of 'senior debt' received $.08-.40 on the dollar, with shareholders of 'junior debt' being completely wiped out.

== Death ==
After being released from prison in 1943, Hopson spent most of the rest of his life in Brooklea Sanatorium. Hopson died on December 22, 1949, in Greenwich, Connecticut, as a result of a cerebral hemorrhage. He is buried in Mount Auburn Cemetery, Cambridge Massachusetts.

== Bibliography ==
- Integration of Public Utility Holding Companies
- Hannan, Caryn (2008). Wisconsin Biographical Dictionary. State History Publications. ISBN 9781878592637.
- "Associated Gas And Electric Company Papers" (PDF). Archived from the original (PDF) on July 27, 2010.
- "ASSOCIATED GAS AND ELECTRIC COMPANY Annual reports (1922-1939)" (PDF).
- Ingham, John N. (1983). Biographical Dictionary of American Business Leaders. Greenwood Publishing Group. ISBN 978-0-313-21362-5.
- DeKok, David (2011). Epidemic. Rowman & Littlefield. ISBN 9780762767618.
- Thurtle, Robert Glenn (2009). Lineage Book of Hereditary Order of Descendants of Colonial Governors. Genealogical Publishing Com. ISBN 9780806350875.
