= Hale v. Kentucky =

- Supreme Court of the United States

Argued March 29, 1938 Decided April 11, 1938
- Full case name: Joe Hale v. Commonwealth of Kentucky
- Citations: 303 U.S. 613 (more) 58 S.Ct. 753; 82 L. Ed. 1050; 1938 U.S. LEXIS 300

Case history
- Prior: Hale v. Commonwealth, 269 Ky. 743, 108 S.W.2d 716 (1937); cert. granted, 303 U.S. 629 (1938).

Holding
- The equal protection of the laws guaranteed to petitioner by the Fourteenth Amendment had been denied.

Court membership
- Chief Justice Charles E. Hughes Associate Justices James C. McReynolds · Louis Brandeis; Pierce Butler · Harlan F. Stone; Owen Roberts · Benjamin N. Cardozo; Hugo Black · Stanley F. Reed

Case opinion
- Per curiam
- Cardozo took no part in the consideration or decision of the case.

Hale v. Kentucky, 303 U.S. 613 (1938), was a United States Supreme Court case relating to racial discrimination in the selection of juries for criminal trials. The case overturned the conviction of an African American man accused of murder because the lower court of Kentucky had systematically excluded African Americans from serving on the jury in the case. NAACP counsel, including Charles H. Houston, Leon A. Ransom and Thurgood Marshall, represented Hale.

== Background ==
Joe Hale, an African American, had been convicted in McCracken County, Kentucky. No African Americans were selected as jury members within the previous 50 years although nearly 7,000 were eligible for jury service.

== Opinion of the Court ==
The court unanimously ruled that the plaintiff's civil rights had been violated.

== Impact ==
Hale v. Kentucky was one in a series of cases where the Supreme Court overturned convictions of blacks for reason of discrimination in jury selections in the lower courts.

== See also ==
- List of United States Supreme Court cases, volume 303
- Norris v. Alabama (1935)
- Hollins v. Oklahoma (1935)
- NAACP in Kentucky
