= Connecticut General Life Insurance Co. v. Johnson =

Connecticut General Life Insurance Company v. Johnson
- Supreme Court of the United States

Argued January 14, 1938 Decided January 31, 1938
- Full case name: Connecticut General Life Insurance Company v. Charles G. Johnson, Treasurer of State of California
- Citations: 303 U.S. 77 (more) 58 S.Ct. 436; 82 L. Ed. 673; 1938 U.S. LEXIS 258

Court membership
- Chief Justice Charles E. Hughes Associate Justices James C. McReynolds · Louis Brandeis; Pierce Butler · Harlan F. Stone; Owen Roberts · Benjamin N. Cardozo; Hugo Black · Stanley F. Reed

Case opinions
- Majority: Stone, joined by Hughes, McReynolds, Brandeis, Butler, Roberts, Reed
- Dissent: Black
- Cardozo took no part in the consideration or decision of the case.

Connecticut General Life Insurance Company v. Johnson, 303 U.S. 77 (1938), is a case in which the Supreme Court of the United States dealt with corporate entities. The case involved whether California could levy a tax on a company licensed to do business in that state for transactions that occurred in a different state.

== Judgment ==
Justice Stone delivered the opinion of the Court. Justice Hugo Black dissented.

== See also ==
- Corporate personhood
- List of United States Supreme Court cases, volume 303
- Santa Clara County v. Southern Pacific Railroad
