= Lovell v. City of Griffin =

- Supreme Court of the United States

Argued February 4, 1938 Decided March 28, 1938
- Full case name: Alma Lovell v. City of Griffin, Georgia
- Citations: 303 U.S. 444 (more) 58 S. Ct. 666; 82 L. Ed. 949; 1938 U.S. LEXIS 297

Case history
- Prior: 55 Ga. App. 609, 191 S.E. 152 (Ct. App. 1937); probable jurisdiction noted, 58 S. Ct. 52 (1937).

Holding
- An ordinance broadly regulating the distribution of literature within the city limits was unconstitutional on its face.

Court membership
- Chief Justice Charles E. Hughes Associate Justices James C. McReynolds · Louis Brandeis; Pierce Butler · Harlan F. Stone; Owen Roberts · Benjamin N. Cardozo; Hugo Black · Stanley F. Reed

Case opinion
- Majority: Hughes, joined by McReynolds, Brandeis, Butler, Stone, Roberts, Black, Reed
- Cardozo took no part in the consideration or decision of the case.

Laws applied
- U.S. Const. amends. I, XIV

Lovell v. City of Griffin, 303 U.S. 444 (1938), is a United States Supreme Court case. This case was remarkable in its discussion of the requirement of persons to seek government sanction to distribute religious material. In this particular case, the Supreme Court ruled it was not constitutional for a city to require such sanction.

== Background ==
Appellant, Alma Lovell, had been distributing literature as a Jehovah's Witness. She was arrested for this, pursuant to a Griffin, Georgia city ordinance which read, in part, that the

practice of distributing, either by hand or otherwise, circulars, handbooks, advertising, or literature of any kind, whether said articles are being delivered free, or whether same are being sold, within the limits of the City of Griffin, without first obtaining written permission from the City Manager of the City of Griffin, such practice shall be deemed a nuisance, and punishable as an offense against the City of Griffin.

Alma Lovell did not contest the fact that she was distributing material in violation of this ordinance, but attested that the ordinance itself was unconstitutional, in that it violated her First Amendment and Fourteenth Amendment rights.

Lovell was convicted in the recorder's court of the City of Griffin, and sentenced to punishment of 50 days in jail, as she had not paid her fine of $50. The county court denied Lovell's appeal. The Court of Appeals affirmed the judgment of the lower court, upholding her conviction. The Supreme Court of Georgia denied an application for certiorari. Lovell appealed further, reaching the jurisdiction of the United States Supreme Court.

== Opinion of the Court ==
Chief Justice Hughes delivered the opinion of the court. Justice Cardozo did not take part in the proceedings.

The Court decided that the city ordinance was unconstitutionally overbroad. Because the ordinance restricted not merely the time, place, or manner of the materials distributed, the Court believed that it was in violation of the First Amendment, and, by extension, the Fourteenth Amendment, which guaranteed that the federal constitutional guarantees would be binding on individual states.

The Court reasoned that the ordinance violated the Freedom of the Press condition of the First Amendment, as the city demanded that all distributed periodicals, not merely those that were considered obscene, offensive to public morals, or which advocate unlawful conduct, obtain a license from the city before they could be distributed. The Court felt that the First Amendment was not limited to periodicals and newspapers, that it necessarily included the publication of leaflets, pamphlets, and any opinion or information. "The press in its connotation comprehends every sort of publication which affords a vehicle of information and opinion." This decision has been interpreted to give internet publications freedom of the press.

== See also ==
- List of United States Supreme Court cases
- Lists of United States Supreme Court cases by volume
- List of United States Supreme Court cases by the Hughes Court
- Incorporation of the Bill of Rights
