= Electric Bond & Share Co. v. SEC =

- Supreme Court of the United States

Argued Feb. 7–9, 1938 Decided March 28, 1938
- Full case name: Electric Bond and Share Company et al. v. Securities and Exchange Commission et al.
- Docket no.: 636
- Citations: 303 U.S. 419 (more) 58 S. Ct. 678; 82 L. Ed. 936; 1938 U.S. LEXIS 296

Case history
- Prior: 18 F. Supp. 131 (S.D.N.Y. 1937); affirmed, 92 F.2d 580 (2d Cir. 1937); cert. granted, 302 U.S. 681 (1938).

Holding
- The requirement for registration of holding companies under the Public Utility Holding Company Act of 1935 is legal.

Court membership
- Chief Justice Charles E. Hughes Associate Justices James C. McReynolds · Louis Brandeis; Pierce Butler · Harlan F. Stone; Owen Roberts · Benjamin N. Cardozo; Hugo Black · Stanley F. Reed

Case opinions
- Majority: Hughes, joined by Brandeis, Butler, Stone, Roberts, Black
- Dissent: McReynolds
- Cardozo, Reed took no part in the consideration or decision of the case.

Electric Bond & Share Co. v. Securities & Exchange Commission, 303 U.S. 419 (1938), was a United States Supreme Court case in which the court upheld the constitutionality of the Public Utility Holding Company Act of 1935.

On March 28, 1938, the U.S. Supreme Court ruled in favor of the Securities and Exchange Commission (SEC) on the constitutional dispute between the Electric Bond and Share Company and the SEC over the Public Utility Holding Company Act of 1935. The Act gave the SEC authority to regulate electric companies nationwide and enforce its rules. It required that all companies selling gas and electricity in the United States register with the SEC and restricted holding companies to one or two tiers of subsidiaries. The Act also gave the SEC the power to limit holding companies to a geographic area so that individual states could regulate them.

After the Act was signed into law on August 26, 1935, the electric industry contested the validity of the entire act, 15 U.S.C.A. § 79 et seq., as being in excess of the powers granted to Congress by section 8 of article 1, and in violation of section 1 of article 1 and of the Fifth and Tenth Amendments, of the Constitution of the United States.

On November 26, 1935, the SEC filed its test case in the District Court for the Southern District of New York against the Electric Bond and Share Company (EBASCo). Fourteen of EBASCo's subsidiaries were also petitioners in the case.

== Background ==
In 1914, as a tactic to counter the growing support of public ownership of electric companies, the Vice President of the Pacific Gas and Electric Company, August Hockenbeamer, came up with the idea of selling non-voting securities (stocks) to the public, something theretofore not done in the industry. The National Electric Light Association openly promoted the idea of selling securities regularly to its members, documenting its historic growth, as part of its ongoing public-relations campaign, as later documented in the FTC's 1928-35 Investigations. The FTC's Investigations found serious flaws in how Holding companies were used to manipulate public investors in the electric industry that led to the passage of the Public Utility Holding Company Act of 1935.

The Public Utility Holding Company Act of 1935 was passed by the 74th United States Congress as major New Deal reform legislation. Also known as the Wheeler-Rayburn bill, it subjected U.S. holding companies for the first time to federal regulation. The law gave the SEC the authority to require registration of electric holding companies and lock them down geographically so that they were no longer able to evade state public utilities commissions. It also gave the SEC the power to force holding companies down to just two levels of subsidiaries or break them up. On November 26, 1935, the SEC filed its test suit against the EBASCo. that included 14 of EBASCo's subsidiaries. The SEC won the initial test case in the Southern District Court of New York. Industry opponents then appealed the decision to the Second Circuit Court of Appeals that also upheld the law.

Robert E. Healy, was the general counsel for the Federal Trade Commission that carried out the 1928-35 investigation of the electric industry. The investigation produced detailed recommendations for what the Public Utility Act should do to fix the growing concentration of holding companies. He was appointed by President Roosevelt to be a SEC commissioner when that agency was formed, which was the federal agency given the task of enforcing the Act. Franklin D. Roosevelt also appointed him to be a member of his National Power Policy Committee that wrote the legislation that congress passed on August 24, 1935.

Healy picked Benjamin V. Cohen to be the principal author of the Act. Cohen, who received a Doctor of Juridical Science from Harvard, became a member of President Roosevelt's "Brain Trust" at the suggestion of Felix Frankfurter. Cohen had also worked for Louis Brandeis. In his 2003 book, Arthur M. Schlesinger Jr. labeled the Public Utility Company Act as "neo-Brandeisian". At the time when Schlesinger used the term neo-Brandeisian, he was referring to the historic ideas of supreme court justice Louis Brandeis' views on United States antitrust law.

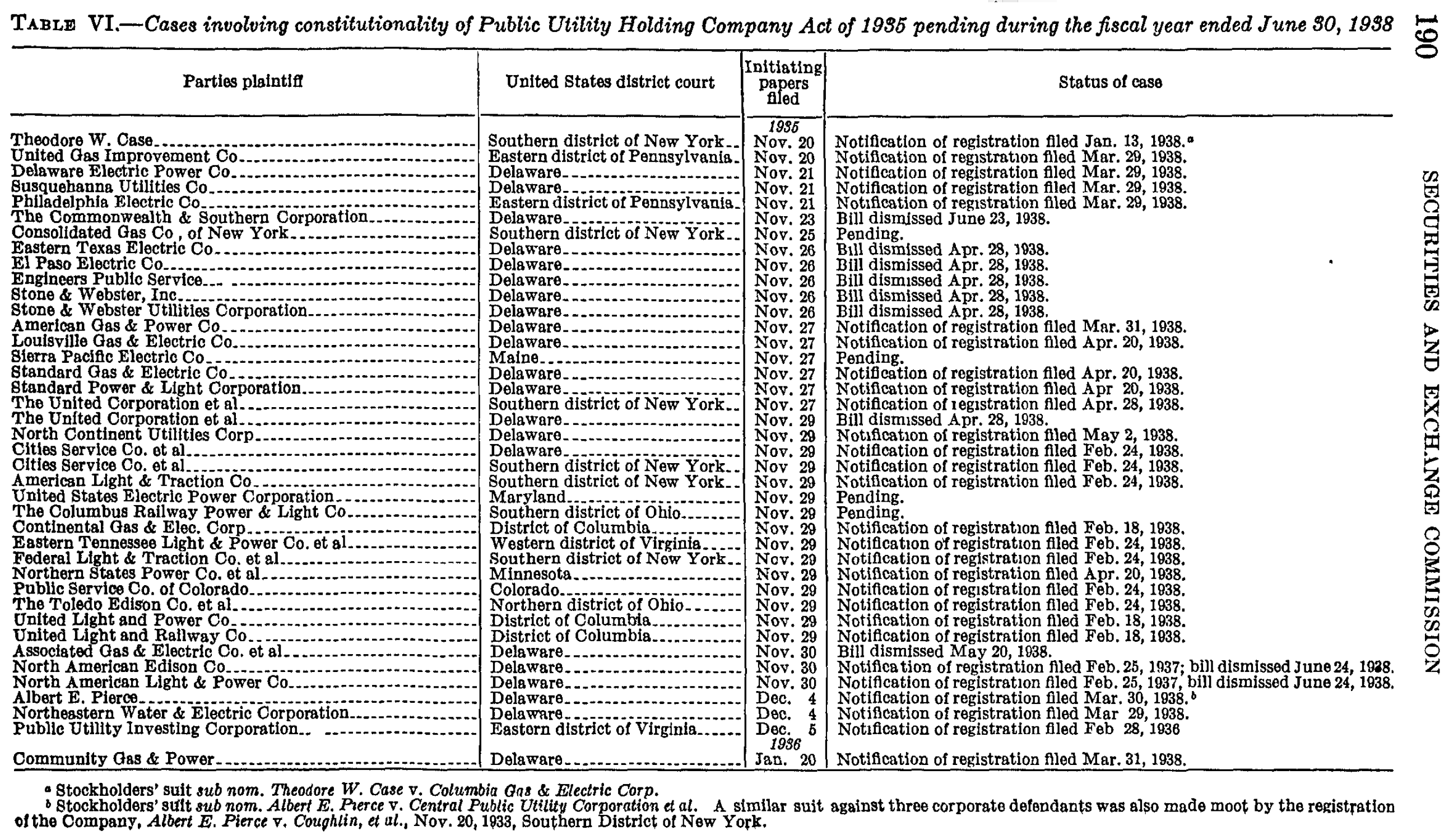
List of constitutional challenges against PUHC Act and SEC 1938

According to the SEC's 1936 annual report, once the enabling legislation passed the U.S. Attorney General, U.S. Postmaster General, and the Commission announced that they would "not enforce any criminal penalties of the Act until the constitutionality of the law had been established by the Supreme Court in a civil suit". In the meantime, electric companies across the United States started filing suit against the law's passage.

The government followed a strategy devised by Benjamin V. Cohen to avoid a test case as long as possible, and then make it a case chosen by the government, not the utilities. On November 26, 1935, the Commission filed the test case against the Electric Bond and Share Company in the District Court for the Southern District of New York. On December 7, 1935, the U.S. Attorney General and the SEC made a motion to stay all lawsuits that the electric industry had already filed in the D.C. District Court against the Act. The Court ruled in its favor on January 9, 1936. However, on June 22, 1936, the U.S. Court of Appeals, reversed the decision because the lawsuits were not all identical. By June 30, 1936, the number of industry lawsuits against the SEC jumped to 58. The U.S. District Court for the Southern District of New York ruled in favor of the SEC on January 29, 1937. On November 8, 1937, the Second Court of Appeals also ruled in favor of the Commission.

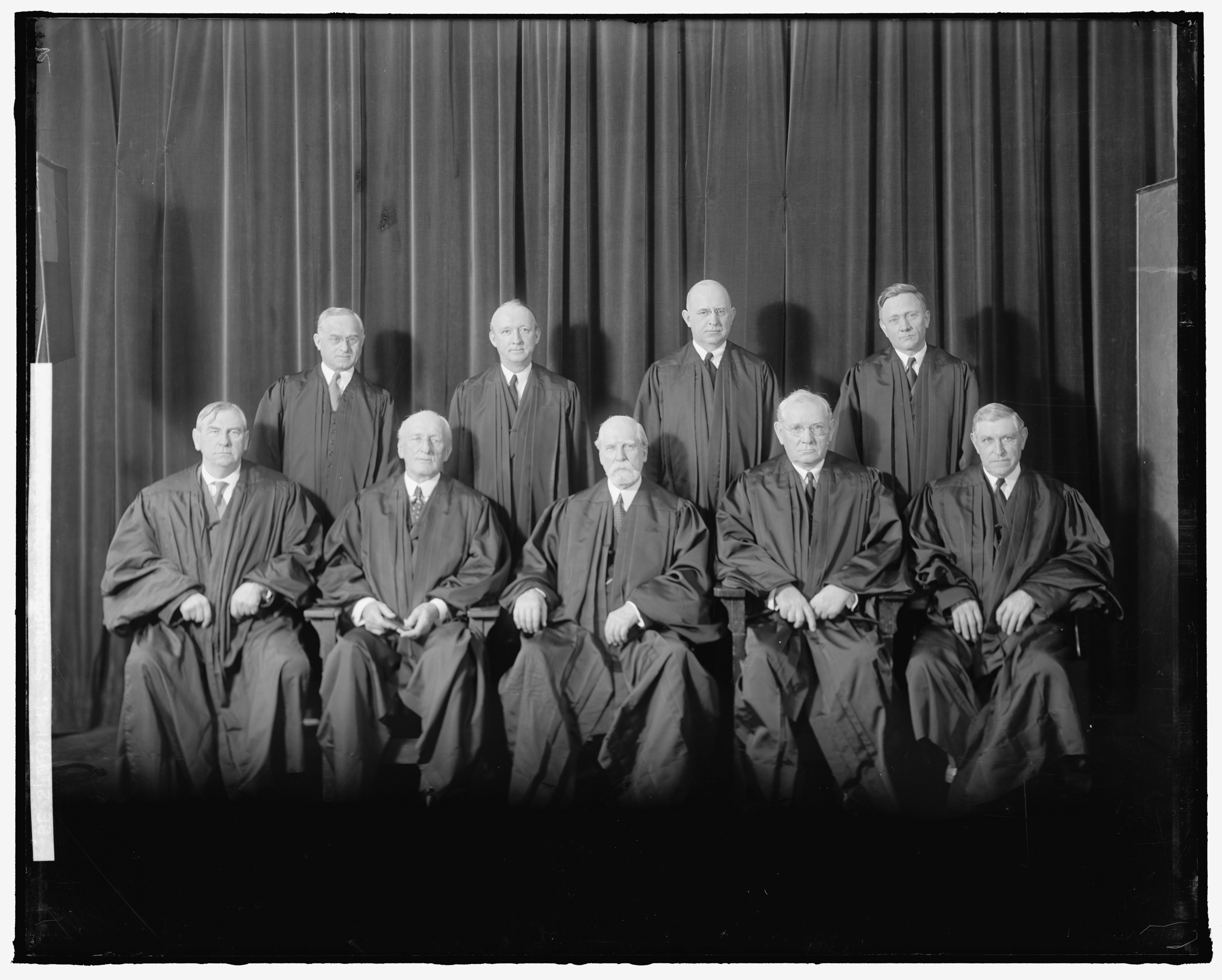
Members of the Supreme Court in 1938

By 1938, thirty-nine of the other fifty-one cases were still active. On March 28, when the U.S. Supreme Court decided the case in favor of the SEC, only one of the other cases had been ruled on. That case was Burco v. Whitworth, 297 U.S. 726 (1936), which lost. All of the other cases were dropped after the Supreme Court decision.

The 1938 decision was decided by the Hughes Court that had held sway during the Great Depression and the New Deal. The Court had been dominated by four conservatives known as the "Four Horsemen" that had struck down many of President Franklin D. Roosevelt's New Deal policies. However, two of the horsemen, Willis Van Devanter and George Sutherland left the court prior to the case being heard. One of the new judges, Hugo Black, who was a Senator in 1935, played a key role in the Act's passage

In 1941 Robert E. Healy gave a speech that included a summary of the 1935 Public Utility Holding Company Act as well as the events before and after its passage. He stated that the passage of the Act gave the SEC the authority to regulate electric holding companies and protect investors. Mr. Healy addressed the industry's attempt to terrify the general public about section 11 of the act during debate in congress and that it would "destroy the utility industry". Instead section 11, he said was "akin to the philosophy of the Sherman Act" and "the utility house is being set in order" based on the findings and recommendations of the 1928-1935 Federal Trade Commission Investigation.

== Judgment ==
The case was heard before the U.S. Supreme Court from February 7–9, 1938.

Lawyers for Ebasco included former Solicitor General of the United States Thomas D. Thacher and John F. MacLane from the law firm Simpson, Thacher & Bartlett, with Frank A. Reid and A.J.G. Priest of the law firm Reid-Priest also taking part in the brief, for petitioners.

United States Assistant Attorney General Robert H. Jackson and Benjamin V. Cohen, with whom United States Attorney General Cummings, Solicitor General Stanley Forman Reed, Assistant Solicitor General Bell, and Allen E. Throop (SEC General Counsel), Thomas G. Corcoran, Paul A. Freund, John J. Abt, and Frederick B. Wiener were on the brief, for the government.

U.S. Solicitor General Stanley Reed was confirmed to the U.S. Supreme Court on January 25, 1938. He took part in presenting the case to the Court, but stepped aside in the case's decision. Cohen and Corcoran were the principal authors of the Public Utility Holding Company Act.

EBASCo. claimed that sections 4(a) and 5 of the Act which required holding companies to register with the SEC violated the Fifth and Tenth Amendments of the Constitution. The Southern District Court of New York ruled in favor of the government as did the appeals court. EBASCo claimed that the U.S. Congress had no right to regulate its interstate activities, but both the court and the Federal Trade Commission investigation between 1928-35 documented that it had been selling services, securities and energy across state lines. Ebasco's core strategy/claim that if any section of the act were in violation, the whole Act should be thrown out.

In his opinion, released on March 28, Chief Justice Hughes denied the defendant's argument as well as the Ebasco's attempt to block the Act from obtaining financial information to protect investors.

On Page 441-2 of the decision, Chief Justice Hughes quoted directly from the act and why Congress wanted to federal supervision of electric holding companies. It summarized the activities of Holding Companies and that the many tiered subsidiaries made effective state control of its interstate activities difficult "if not impossible" to regulate. He also stated that "the national interest and the interest of investors and consumers may be adversely affected".

His opinion was in favor of the Act and that the parts of it relating to registration of utility holding companies were constitutional.

On March 28, 1938, Chief Justice Hughes wrote the majority opinion in favor of the SEC.

There was no written dissent from Justice McReynolds.

Once again, Ebasco attempted to challenge the constitutionality of the Act's Section 11 but on November 25, 1946, the Supreme Court ruled 6-0 in favor of the Act and the SEC (see American Power & Light Co. v. Securities and Exchange Commission 1946).

Standard And Poor's Outlook, No. 39, P. 462. dated 1943 made the following comment on the Act:

"... there is no denying that [SEC policy] has helped investors by improving the financial status of many subsidiaries of utility holding companies..."

In 1946 the University of Pennsylvania Law Review published "A Death Sentence or a New Lease On Life? A Survey Of Corporate Adjustments Under the Public Utility Holding Company Act" By Robert M. Blair-Smith and Leonard Helfenstein (pg 148-201). Their piece documented the process of how the SEC oversaw the reorganization the United Light and Power Company and its 75 subsidiaries (pg 161-188) over a ten-year period with the goal of protecting public investors. Their conclusion was that:

"...the Commission under Section 11 has been to eliminate or reduce the leverage feature in equity securities of holding-company systems, to bring sound equity securities out of system portfolios into the public markets in place of the relatively weak and speculative securities of the holding companies..."

Their study also said:

"Between the end of 1935 and June 30, 1944, holding companies divested themselves of 266 companies with assets of over 3 3/4 billion dollars."

== Subsequent developments ==
- North American Co. v. SEC
- 1942 - MORGAN STANLEY & CO., Inc., v. SECURITIES EXCHANGE COMMISSION. 126 F.2d 325 Circuit Court of Appeals, Second Circuit
- SEC v. Chenery Corp. (1943)
- 1943 - American Gas & Electric Co. v. Security and Exchange Commission
- 1944 - American Power & L. Co. v. Securities and Ex. Com'n, 141 F.2d 606 US Court of Appeals for the First Circuit
- 1944 - U.S. District Court of Delaware: United Gas Corp.
- 1944 - In Re Securities and Exchange Commission, 142 F.2d 411 US Court of Appeals for the Third Circuit
- 1945 - American Power & Light Co. v. Securities & Exchange Commission
- 1945 - In Re Standard Gas & Electric Co., 59 F. Supp. 274 U.S. District Court of Delaware
- 1946 - American Power & Light Co. v. Securities and Exchange Commission
- 1946 - North American Co. v. SEC
- 1949 - U.S. Supreme Court - Electric Power & Light Co.
- 1952 - Kantor v. American & Foreign Power Co.
- 1953 - U.S. N.Y. District Court - Electric Bond and Share Co.
- 1954 - U.S. Court of Appeals - Electric Power & Light Corporation
- Energy Policy Act of 1992
- The Public Utility Holding Company Act of 1935 was Repealed by the Energy Policy Act of 2005

== See also ==
- List of United States Supreme Court cases, volume 303
