= Public Utility Holding Company Act of 1935 =

U.S. law

Public Utility Holding Company Act
- Long title: An Act to provide for control and regulation of public-utility holding companies, and for other purposes.
- Acronyms (colloquial): PUHCA
- Nicknames: Wheeler-Rayburn Act
- Enacted by: the 74th United States Congress
- Effective: October 1, 1935

Citations
- Public law: 74-333 15 U.S.C.A. § 79 et seq.
- Statutes at Large: 74-687

Codification
- Titles amended: 15 U.S.C.: Commerce and Trade
- U.S.C. sections created: 15 U.S.C. ch. 2C—Public Utility Holding Companies § 79 et seq.

Legislative history
- Introduced in the Senate as S. 1725 by Burton K. Wheeler (D–MT) on February 6, 1935; Committee consideration by Interstate Commerce Committee, House Commerce Committee; Passed the Senate on June 11, 1935 (56 to 32); Passed the House on August 24, 1935 (222 to 112); House agreed to amendment on July 2, 1935 (323 to 81); Signed into law by President Franklin D. Roosevelt on August 26, 1935

Major amendments
- National Energy Act of 1978; Energy Policy Act of 1992; American Recovery and Reinvestment Act of 2009; Tax Relief, Unemployment Insurance Reauthorization, and Job Creation Act of 2010; Repealed by Energy Policy Act of 2005

United States Supreme Court cases
- 1938 - Electric Bond and Share Company v. Securities and Exchange Commission; 1946 - American Power & Light Co. v. Securities and Exchange Commission; 1946 - North American Co. v. SEC

The Public Utility Holding Company Act of 1935 (PUHCA), also known as the Wheeler-Rayburn Act, was a US federal law giving the Securities and Exchange Commission authority to regulate, license, and break up electric utility holding companies. It limited holding company operations to a single state, thus subjecting them to effective state regulation. It also broke up any holding companies with more than two tiers, forcing divestitures so that each became a single integrated system serving a limited geographic area. Another purpose of the PUHCA was to keep utility holding companies engaged in regulated businesses from also engaging in unregulated businesses. The act was based on the conclusions and recommendations of the 1928-35 Federal Trade Commission investigation of the electric industry. On March 12, 1935, President Franklin D. Roosevelt released a report he commissioned by the National Power Policy Committee. This report became the template for the PUHCA. The political battle over its passage was one of the bitterest of the New Deal, and was followed by eleven years of legal appeals by holding companies led by the Electric Bond and Share Company, which finally completed its breakup in 1961.

On August 26, 1935, President Franklin D. Roosevelt signed the bill into law.

The Energy Policy Act of 2005 repealed the PUHCA under George W. Bush.

== Context ==
The passage of the Public Utilities Holding Company Act was the climax to the thirty-year nationwide fight between public vs. private development of electricity in the United States. Other societal issues like the postal service, public roads, schools, social security, national health insurance, and public ownership of electric generation were part of a global phenomenon with most of Europe and regions of the United States in support of mixed economies. The National Electric Light Association and its member companies organized the largest U.S. Public Relations campaign of the 1920s. The campaign had two goals: to stigmatize public ownership on the one hand while promoting the rapid consolidation of the private sector into a few giant multi-tiered holding companies. The nearly 2,000 cities that had public systems, led by Nebraska Senator George W. Norris, Montana Senator Thomas J. Walsh and Pennsylvania Governor Gifford Pinchot were able to pass the 1928 Senate Resolution 83 which directed the Federal Trade Commission to conduct a detailed investigation of the industry's finances and propaganda war waged against publicly owned utilities. That seven-year investigation took on special meaning following the Wall Street Crash of 1929 as the early phase of the investigation showed large scale corruption hidden within the six to ten layered pyramid holding company structures that concentrated financial power in the hands of a few.

In June 1932, the Middle West Utility empire, one of the largest electric holding companies operating in 39 U.S. states went bankrupt, destroying the life savings of hundreds of thousands of small investors across the east and mid-west. New York Governor Franklin Delano Roosevelt, who was a public power supporter campaigned on the issue of reforming the electric industry and won election as the country's 32nd president. His initial years in office included large public works projects such as the Tennessee Valley Authority, Bonneville Power Administration and California's Central Valley Project. These were all massive, federally funded water and power projects that put tens of thousands of people to work. The most important of these projects was the Rural Electrification Administration that finally brought electricity to rural America which was shunned by the country's urban-based electric industry as there was no profit to be made.

As the Federal Trade Commission's seven-year investigation was starting to wind up, Roosevelt formed the National Power Policy Committee (NPPC) to make sense of the investigation and its recommendations. The PUHCA was originally requested by Franklin Delano Roosevelt in his Second State of the Union Address and was based on the work done by the NPPC. The committee was made up of federal agencies, led by Robert E. Healy who oversaw the 1928-35 Federal Trade Commission's 63,000-page electric investigation. On February 6, 1935, the Wheeler-Rayburn bill was introduced by Senator Wheeler (S 1725) and Representative Rayburn (HR 5423). It was one of several New Deal trust-busting and securities regulation initiatives that were enacted following the Wall Street Crash of 1929 and the ensuing Great Depression. By 1932, eight of the largest utility holding companies controlled 73 percent of the investor-owned electric industry. Their complex, highly leveraged, corporate structures were very difficult for individual states to regulate.

== History ==
The New Deal's agenda would face its biggest legislative fight over the passage of the PUHCA. Since March 1928, the Federal Trade Commission (FTC) was releasing monthly reports to the Senate on its investigation of the electric industry. On November 15, 1934, the FTC released segment 71A of its 94-volume investigation that summarized the decades-old "propaganda" war against the general public and supporters of municipal ownership of electric facilities. There was little coverage of the FTC's ongoing public hearings or monthly reports by the country's conservative news media, but that would soon change.

On November 20, 1934, the Associated Press released a detailed story about Roosevelt's National Power Policy Committee (NPPC). Roosevelt set up the NPPC on July 29, 1934, to review and report on the FTC's massive electric industry investigation. Roosevelt picked Securities and Exchange Commissioner and former judge Robert E. Healy, who had also been in charge of the FTC's electric investigation, to lead the NPPC review. The article disclosed all of the administration's legislative plan two months before the NPPC or the FTC had released their reports or recommendations on the electric industry.

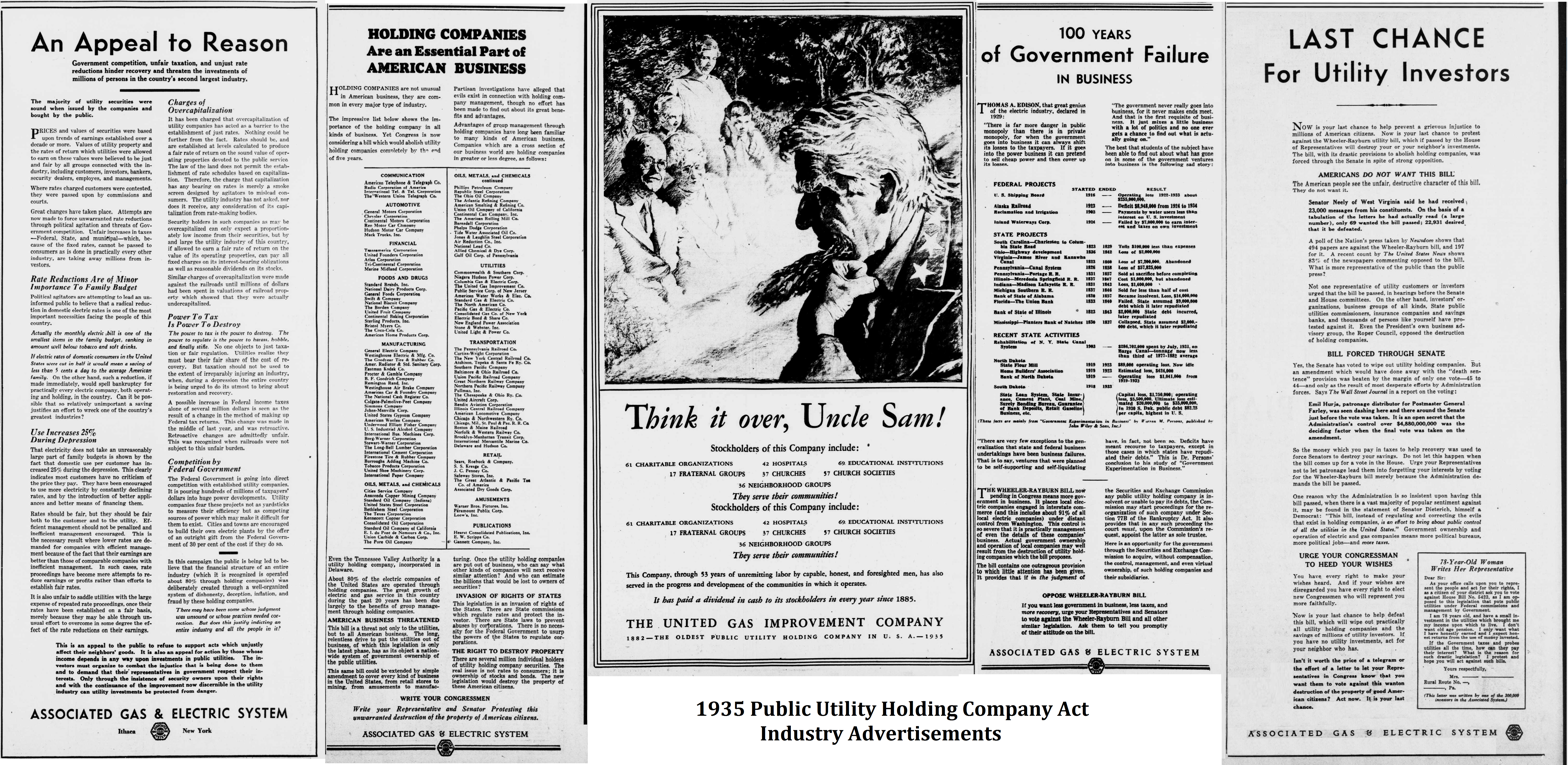
Collage of January–June 1935 advertisements appearing in the Washington Evening Star

On January 4, 1935, Roosevelt announced his plan to regulate the electric industry in his Second State of the Union Address. The FTC's investigation was still a year from being completed, with ongoing financial studies and work on the natural gas industry still incomplete. However, on January 25, three days before the FTC released segment 73A of the 94 volume investigation to the US Senate, covering its financial recommendations on electric holding companies, the massive Associated Gas & Electric (AG&E) holding company placed its first large attack advertisement in major newspapers.

The FTC on January 28 released a 200-page report that called for the elimination of "evil practices and conditions" in the industry that its investigation had uncovered. In its November 1934 summary, the FTC documented the "propaganda" war waged against the public power movement dating back at least to 1919. In fact, the industry's own annual proceedings clearly document that its campaign against public power had been active since the 1890s. In 1906, the National Electric Light Association's "co-operation" campaign was established in part to monitor and counter the nationwide public ownership movement.

=== Conservative press ===
An integral part of the industry's co-operation campaign was its friendly public relations strategy with the nation's press. The result was that the FTC investigation did not appear to be newsworthy. The FTC exposed the industry's nationwide propaganda campaign in the industry's own words to censor any negative coverage or history related to its activities, including the manipulation of the nation's textbook and radio industries.

For example, MH Aylesworth, the first president of the National Broadcasting Company (NBC) was also the executive director of the National Electric Light Association from 1921 to 1926. It was General Electric that founded the Radio Corporation of America, which purchased the country's first radio network from AT&T and became NBC in 1926.

The FTC investigation produced thousands of pages of testimony on how the country's electric industry successfully enlisted the support of the press across the country with its strategy of dangling advertising dollars and submitted vast quantities of anonymous materials to it for publication. The country's mostly conservative press had become allies with the industry in its goal to stigmatize the municipal ownership community as un-American. Going back to the 1907-13 period when the entire country shifted from municipal to state regulation of the electric industry with the creation of state agencies known as Public utilities commissions, this shift that favored private companies should have been framed as a regressive shift in favor of the "power trust" as big electric companies were commonly referred to or "city vs. state" power politics. However, that was not how the conservative press framed the struggle or what its advertising client the electric industry wanted. The shift from municipal to state regulatory oversight also represents one of the largest examples of regulatory capture known as the complexity of the electricity industry combined with the model laws passed between 1907 and 1913 resulted in commissions made up almost entirely of former industry professionals. That bias became evident when 46 of the 48 state commissions openly sided with the electric industry during public hearings on the bill.

In other words, the investigation documented that the electric industry had set up a personal relationship with the owners and editorial boards of the news industry and so were given tens of thousands of free editorial pieces monthly. In many cases, the industry's own press services distributed content, which the local and national newspapers then reprinted without acknowledging the source. The same relationship with the press would then be used to frame the battle to stop the bill by terrifying the country's small investors with their "death sentence" clause, which the press repeated from then onward.

=== Congressional introduction of legislation ===
On February 6, 1935, 9 days after the Federal Trade Commission released its conclusions and recommendations from its six-year probe, Senator Wheeler (SB 1725) and Rep. Rayburn (HR 5423) introduced legislation that became one of the bitterest legislative fights in history.

Senator Wheeler's version of the legislation was submitted to the Senate's Interstate Commerce Committee, which held public hearings were held, and amendments were voted on and passed by a vote of 14–2 on May 13. The bill passed the full Senate by a vote of 56 to 32 on June 11. However, Representative Rayburn faced a full-scale war. Representatives were being blasted by millions of letters and hundreds of thousands of telegrams demanding the defeat of the legislation, and the industry lined up allies that produced many expert witnesses during hearings. At the same time, an army of unregistered lobbyists stormed the doors of representatives as the country's print media was bombarded with major ads and editorials opposing the legislation.

=== Death Sentence Clause fails in House vote ===
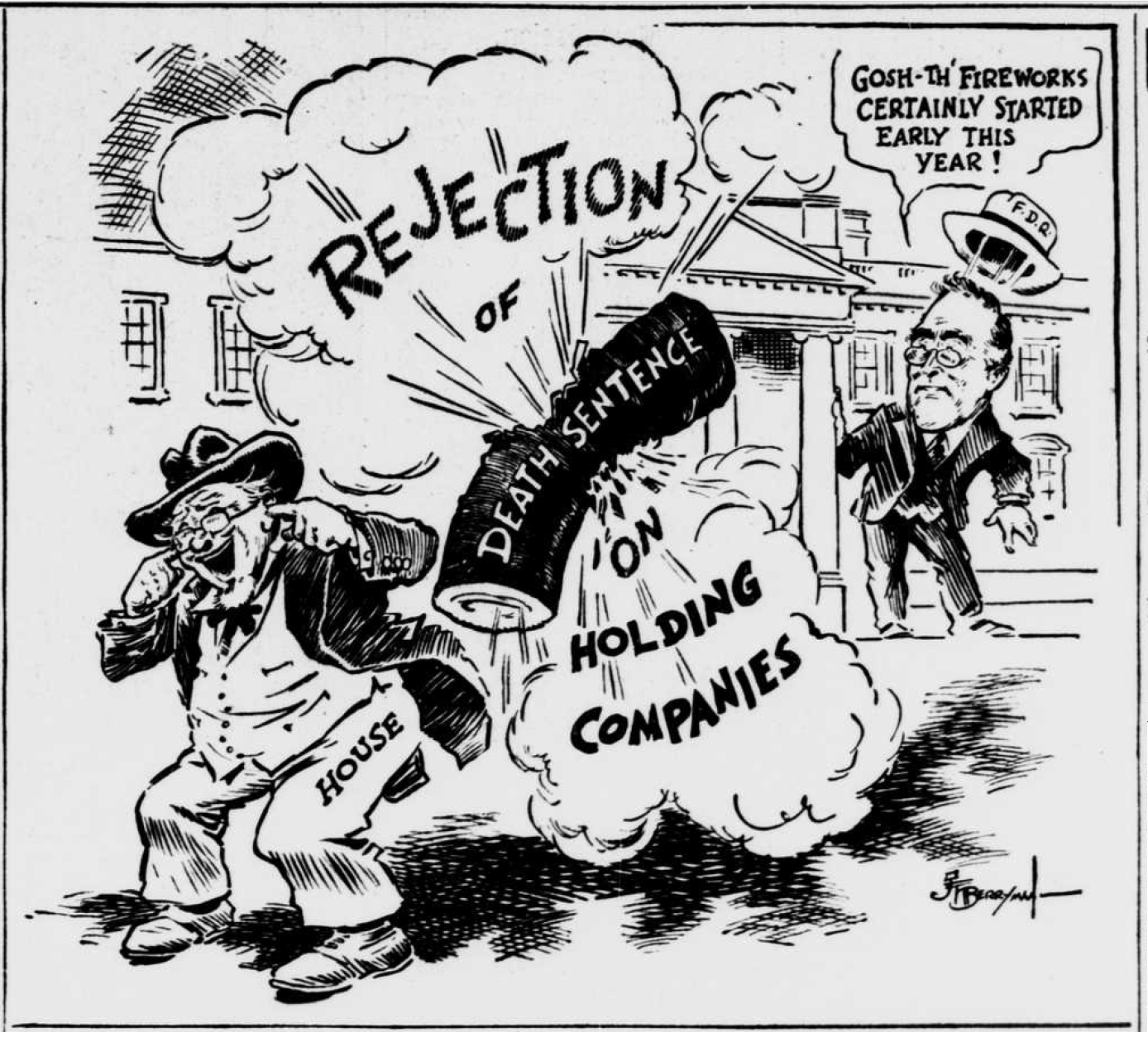
Wheeler-Rayburn Bill death sentence comic published in the Washington Evening Star, July 3, 1935

On July 2, newspaper headlines across the country blared that Roosevelt and his "Death Clause" had lost as the House of Representatives pulled the dreaded Section 2 of the house bill. The campaign rhetoric against the law became so extreme that lobbyists were even claiming that Roosevelt was planning on taking over the industry. Even bringing in opposition to the bill from the country's public utility commissioners, but there was a mistake: just a couple of towns in the country show up as the source for almost all of the telegrams sent to Congress. The same day that the clause was pulled, the Senate organized a new committee to look into the lobbying. Alabama Senator Hugo Black was placed in charge of the investigating committee, and the House also opened a special committee, which was led by an industry supporter who used his time to attack the president.

=== Investigation of Electric Industry's Lobbying Campaign ===
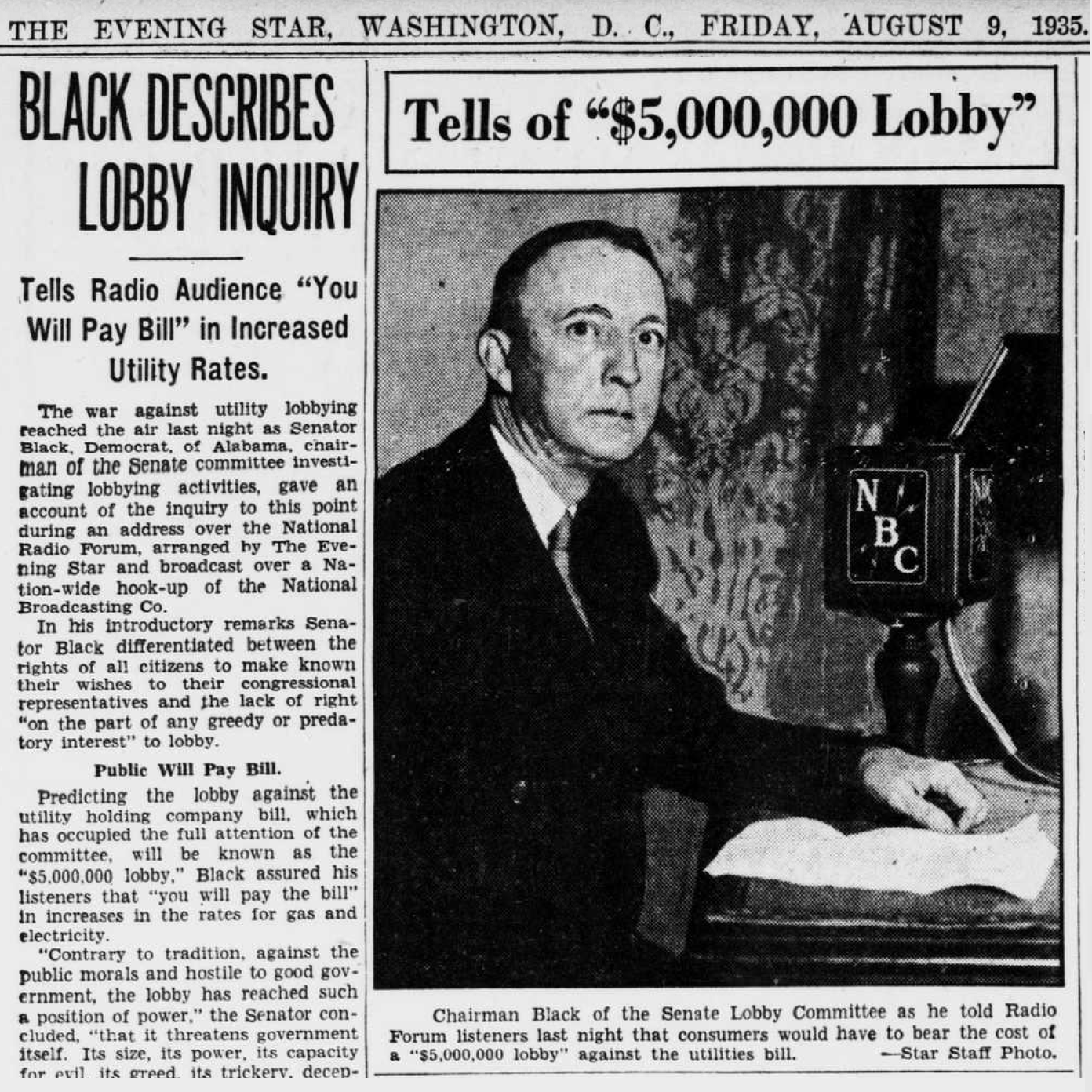
Senator Hugo Black Tells of $5 Million Lobby

The Black Committee quickly got to the bottom of what was a fake nationwide campaign orchestrated by the electric industry to make it look like there was real public opposition to the legislation. On August 8, Black went on nationwide radio prime time to describe the $5 million (now the equivalent of $93 million) war mounted against the legislation. He also pointed the finger at the head of AG&E, Howard C. Hopson, who was subpoenaed by the committee but had yet to be found. His nearly-bankrupt company had spent over $700,000 opposing the legislation. AG&E was found to be behind an estimated 250,000 fake telegrams that impersonated citizens who had no knowledge that their names had been attached to telegrams. Hearings documented the destruction of electric companies data in a desperate attempt to cover up the fake movement's millions of letters and telegrams in which even the Western Union offices that had launched the tens of thousands of telegrams accidentally had its records deleted against company policy. Western Union eventually tracked down 97,000 of the fake telegrams, which had been partially burned.

Other major issues from claims by senators that their phones had been wired tapped by electric companies, the FTC's report of extensive tax evasion even to bribery surfaced during the Black Committee lobbying investigation. The Black Committee's aggressive use of tactics often used against less powerful citizens is still used as an historic example by conservatives of government abuse.

In an even more dramatic fashion, the House investigating committee located Hopson first and then used its subpoena to protect him from the Senate investigation but let Hopson promote the industry side. It was later disclosed that Representative Conner's brother had been given $25,000 by the industry, and the other members of the committee were eventually able to block the chair's attempt to protect Hopson by putting him under house arrest and then immediately releasing him, which would have by law blocked the Senate from getting him. The scandal gave Roosevelt and other supporters of the bill the power to sway the House back into a revote, which finally passed by a vote of 222–112 on August 24. Hopson was eventually convicted of stealing $20 million from Associated Gas & Electric ratepayers.

The so-called "Death Sentence" clause survived – the most expensive lobbying campaigns of the 20th century had failed.

=== Holding Companies vs. Public Utilities Holding Company Act 1935-1954 ===
Talk of legal challenges were in the news the day congress passed the Wheeler-Rayburn legislation. On September 24, the Edison Electric Institute went into court challenging PUHCA's constitutionality. According to the Associated Press, on October 2 The Federal Trade Commission issued a complaint charging the National Electrical Manufacturers Association of New York and 16 member manufacturers with “unlawful combination, conspiracy and agreement to restrain competition”. The same day, another suit against PUHCA was filed in United States District Court of Maryland for trustees of the American States Public Service Co.

With the President Roosevelt signing Wheeler-Rayburn bill into law on August 26, 1935, the Securities and Exchange Commission began the process of preparing for carrying out the two main parts (Title I & II) of the law now called the Public Utilities Holding Company Act of 1935. As stated in the SEC's 1936 annual report, the agency adopted 7 new rules and 11 forms that electric companies were required to fill out when registering as all were required to do by December 31, 1935. By this June 1936, only 65 companies had registered while an additional 375 had requested exemptions.

By December 7, 1935, forty-five lawsuits on behalf of more than 100 companies had been filed in 13 different U.S. District Courts across the country. On this same day, the U.S. Attorney General and the SEC's General Counsel made a motion before the U.S. Supreme Court to stay all of the above lawsuits until the Supreme Court could determine the validity of PUHCA with the case Securities and Exchange Commission v, Electric Bond and Share Company. On November 26, 1935, the SEC, pursuant to its express authority under Section 18 of the Act, brought suit in the District Court for the Southern District of New York against the Electric Bond and Share Company and fourteen other holding companies. All other lawsuits against the SEC were dismissed except for one which was decided in favor of the SEC – in the case of Public Utility Investing Corporation. v. Utilities Power and Light Corporation. (82 F. 2d. 21, C. C. A., 4th, 1936) where the court found the act of registering did not do any irreparable damage to the company.

On March 28, 1938, the U.S. Supreme Court ruled in favor of the SEC and the Public Utilities Act of 1935, giving it full authority to enforce the Act. Within 3 months 142 holding companies had registered with the SEC that made up 51 separate public utility systems, comprising 524 individual holding and 1,524 sub-holding and operating companies. An example of the dramatic impacts the law had was documented with the Columbia Gas & Electric Corporation case where the capital represented by the common stock was reduced from $194,349,005.62 to $12,304,282.00 a total of $182,044,723.62 by the elimination of the corrupting holding company structures.

In 1940, congressional investigations of brokerage firms, insurance companies and their relationship to the electric industry exposed that Middle South Utilities, the Southern Group and the Electric Bond and Share Company were all financed by Morgan Stanley, with Wall Street having financial influence over nearly 80% of the country's electric industry.

=== List of PUHCA legal challenges ===
- SEC v. EBASCo., 18 F. Supp. 131 (S.D.N.Y. 1937
- EBASCo. v. SEC, 92 F.2d 580 (2d Cir. 1937)
- 1938 Securities and Exchange Commission v. Electric Bond and Share company
- 1943 - American Gas & Electric Co. v. Security and Exchange Commission
- 1944 - U.S. District Court of Delaware: United Gas Corp.
- 1945 - American Power & Light Co. v. Securities & Exchange Commission
- 1946 - American Power & Light Co. v. Securities and Exchange Commission
- 1946 - North American Co. v. SEC
- 1949 - U.S. Supreme Court - Electric Power & Light Co.
- 1952 - Kantor v. American & Foreign Power Co.
- 1953 - U.S. N.Y. District Court - Electric Bond and Share Co.
- 1954 - U.S. Court of Appeals - Electric Power & Light Corporation

== Summary ==
The Act required the Securities and Exchange Commission (SEC) to approve a holding company engaging in a non-utility business and such businesses to be kept separate from the utility's regulated business. Holding companies were required to register with the SEC, which would then conduct administrative proceedings to limit each holding company to ownership of a single integrated electric system (with certain exceptions) through the divestiture of the securities of other public utility and unrelated companies.

The Act also authorized the SEC to flatten the corporate structure of utilities to remove unnecessary corporate layers. Individual operating utility companies could centralize certain business operations into central Service Companies, but all Service Companies would be subject to SEC and Federal Power Commission regulation. (In 1977, the Federal Power Commission was replaced by the Federal Energy Regulatory Commission (FERC)).

As a result, when a state utility commission regulated a utility in a particular state, the rate payers of that state would pay only the share of any common service company expenses associated with that state's electric company allocated to it under SEC-approved formulas to prevent a holding company from double recovery of its expenses when it operates in more than one state.

Because the SEC strictly enforced the divestiture provision of PUHCA in its proceedings and ordered divestiture of all corporate holdings except for a single integrated electric system, the affected holding companies filed voluntary divestiture plans. As a result, by 1948, holding companies had voluntarily divested themselves of assets worth approximately $12 billion and the number of subsidiaries controlled by affected holding companies was reduced from 1,983 to 303.

An important provision prohibited sales of goods or services between holding company affiliates at a profit. These rules prevented the utilities from increasing their cost-based regulated rates by artificially marking up the prices paid by the utility operating companies above what the central purchasing affiliate paid.

One noticeable impact of this provision was on electric streetcars. Most electric streetcar companies were private companies, owned by electric utility holding companies. The streetcar companies were generally unregulated while the electric utilities were regulated. By investing directly in transit firms, the electric companies were "cash cows" even in the Great Depression and were able to increase the basis of their limited return on investment.

The result of the provision was the divestiture of utility-owned electric streetcar companies, which were then acquired by various parties and very often dismantled to be replaced by buses or trackless trolleys. The largest fallout of the divestiture was the General Motors nationwide streetcar dismantlement.

== Legacy ==
Through the years, the utility industry and would-be owners of utilities lobbied Congress heavily to repeal PUHCA, claiming that it was outdated. For example, in 1989, Standley H. Hoch, CEO of General Public Utilities (GPU) had two mandates as leader: trim management and lower costs, and fight to repeal the Public Utility Holding Company Act of 1935.

On August 8, 2005, the Energy Policy Act of 2005 passed both houses of Congress and was signed into law, repealing PUHCA. The repeal became effective on February 8, 2006. It was replaced by a set of laws called the "Public Utility Holding Company Act of 2005", which gave the FERC a limited role in allocating the costs of multi-state electric utility holding companies to individual operating subsidiaries. There were consumer, environmental, union and credit rating agency objections to the new law.

The 2005 Act had many provisions that applied to just electric subsidiaries to the exclusion of natural gas subsidiaries of holding companies. On December 8, 2005, FERC recommended that Congress amend the 2005 Act to give FERC cost allocation authority over gas subsidiaries, and greater enforcement authority over gas subsidiaries, but Congress has not acted on FERC's request.

== See also ==
- Sam Rayburn
- Burton K. Wheeler
