= Electric Bond and Share Company =

Defunct American electric utility holding company

- Type: Holding company for General Electric
- Industry: Energy
- Founded: 1905; 121 years ago
- Defunct: 1935
- Fate: broken up by the Public Utility Holding Company Act of 1935
- Headquarters: New York City, United States

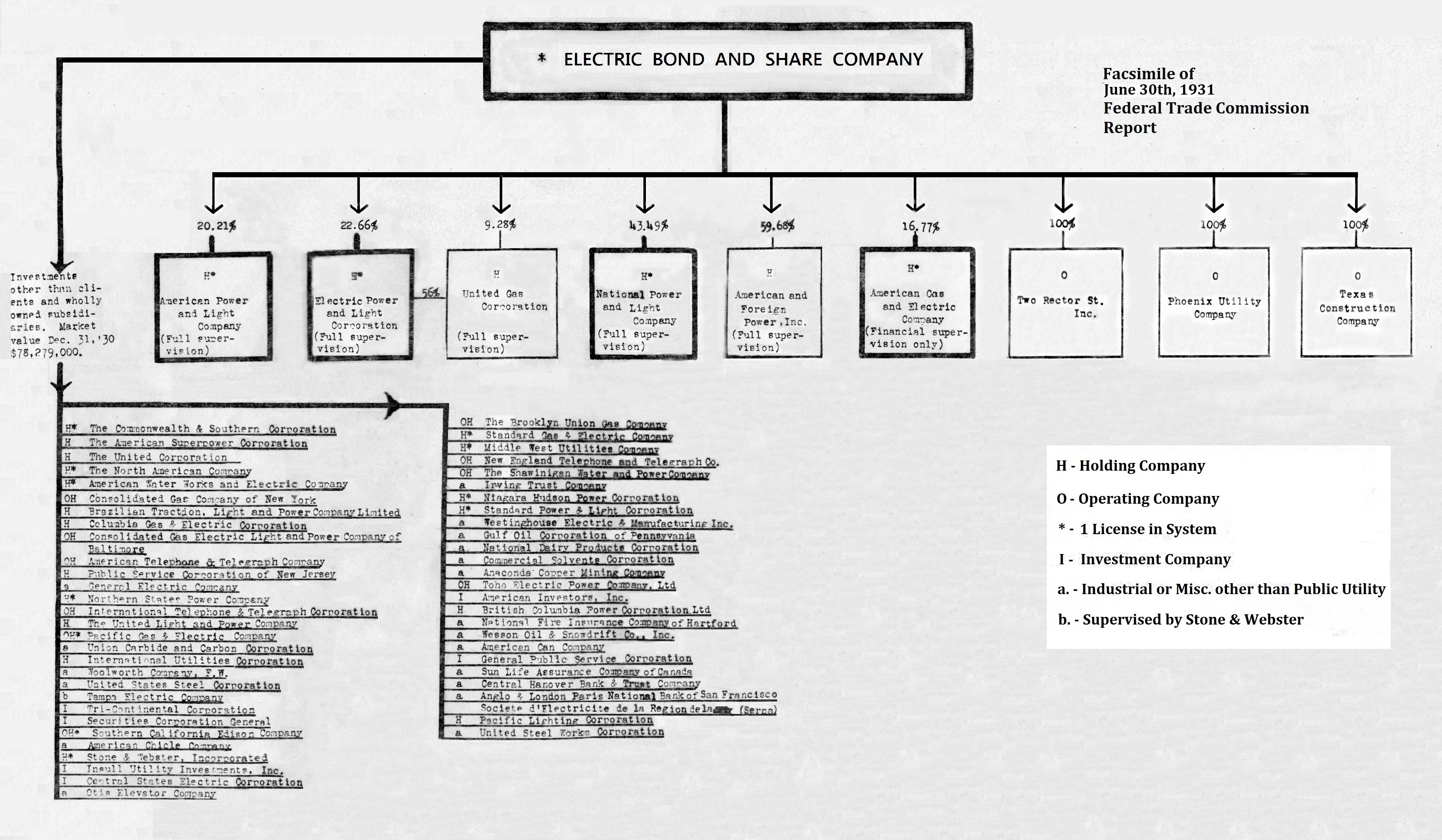
Electric Bond and Share Company investments

The Electric Bond and Share Company (Ebasco) was a United States electric utility holding company created by General Electric in 1905.

It was forced to divest its holding companies and reorganize due to the passage of the Public Utility Holding Company Act of 1935. Following the passage of the Act, the U.S. Securities and Exchange Commission (SEC) selected the largest of the U.S. holding companies, Ebasco to be the test case of the law before the U.S. Supreme Court. The court case known as Securities and Exchange Commission v. Electric Bond and Share company was settled in favor of the SEC on March 28, 1938. It took twenty-five years of legal action by the SEC to break up Ebasco and the other major U.S. electric holding companies until they conformed with the 1935 act. It was allowed to retain control of its foreign electric power holding company known as the American & Foreign Power Company (A&FP).

After its reorganization, it became an investment company, but soon turned into a major designer and engineer of both fossil fuel and nuclear power electric generation facilities. Its involvement in the 1983 financial collapse of the Washington Public Power Supply System's five nuclear reactors led to Ebasco's demise because of the suspension of nuclear power orders and lawsuits that included numerous asbestos claims. The U.S. nuclear industry stopped all construction of new facilities following the 1979 nuclear meltdown at Three Mile Island, going into decline because of radiation safety concerns and major construction cost overruns.

== History ==
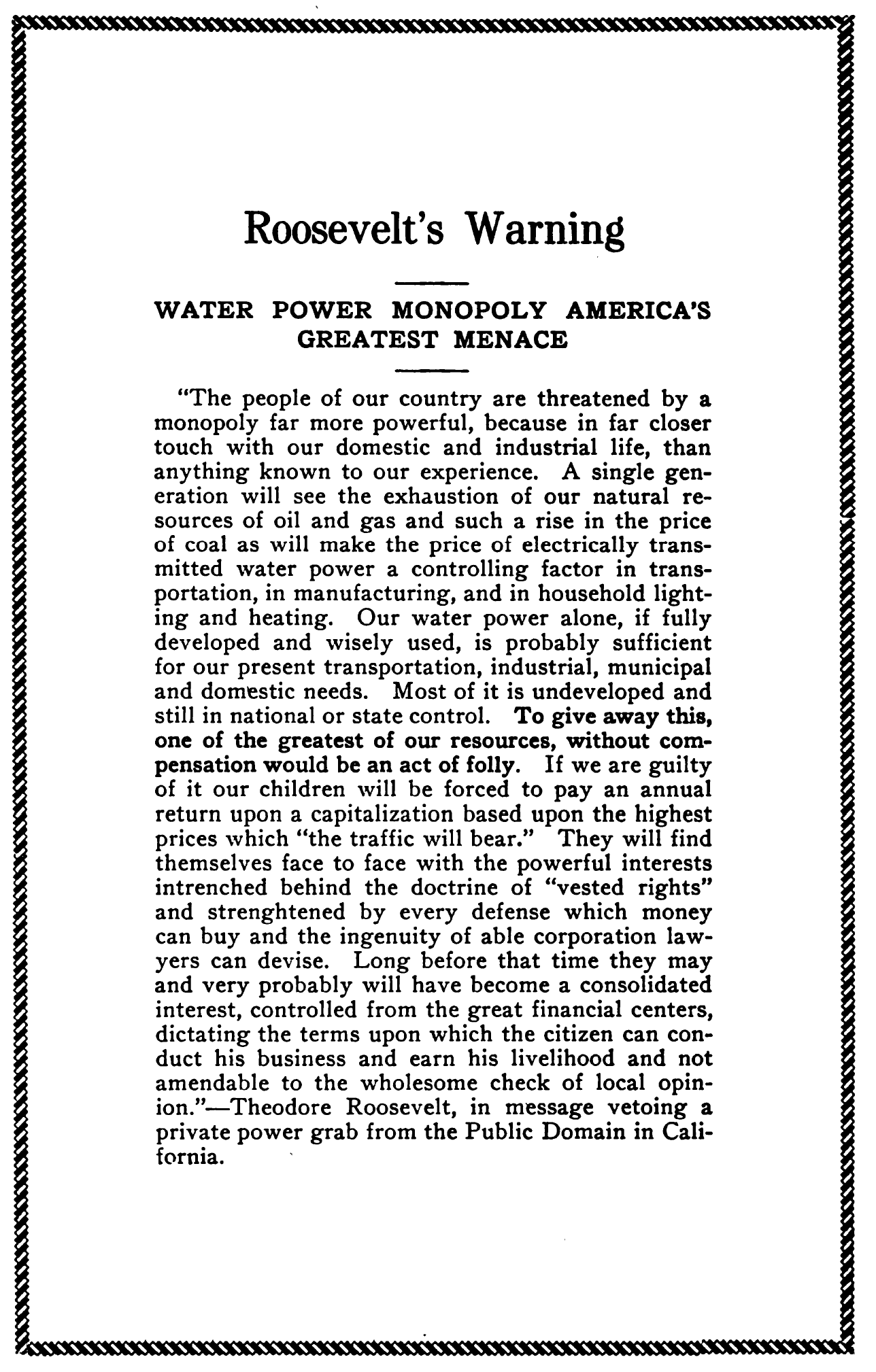
Roosevelt's Warning - Water Power Monopoly America's Greatest Menace

The Electric Bond and Share Group was organized in 1905 as a holding company for electric utility company securities by General Electric using its employees' retirement investment fund. Morgan used his control of General Electric and his position as the country's most powerful financier to set in motion a plan to monopolize the entire country's electric industry via the Electric Bond and Share Group. Until his death in 1913, Morgan was opposed to any form of government regulation. His firing of Samuel Insull resulted with Insull moving to Chicago, where he organized the second-largest holding company in the country, the Middle West Utilities Company or what is known today as Exelon. Insull would actively promote the idea of a regulated monopoly because of the high cost of electrical infrastructure. About the same time as Teddy Roosevelt's trust busting campaign against Morgan, Rockefeller and other elites was gaining national attention, the National Civic Federation (NCF) was formed. It carried out extensive investigations and debates among prominent business men and organized labor over the issue of public vs. private ownership of electric power. Insull's public support for regulation helped popularize NCF's model legislation that quickly spread nationwide after the state of New York adopted its own variation. Morgan's son J. P. Morgan Jr. carried on with the House of Morgan, including his father's goal of a national electric monopoly but was up against the reformist progressive era.

By 1925, General Electric's Electric Bond & Share Group was the largest owner of U.S. and foreign electric companies holding over 10% of the country's companies as subsidiaries organized into five major holding companies. General Electric made a purely symbolic gesture to reduce growing public anger by divesting control of the company leaving Morgan still in financial control. The Commonwealth & Southern Corporation, which owned several utility operating companies in the Midwest and the South, some of which became part of the Southern Company, and the reorganized Electric Bond And Share Company (EBASCo) were both part of J. P Morgan's syndicate via his J.P. Morgan & Co. In 1926, its headquarters in New York City had over 1,000 employees, and controlled companies in 33 states worth $1.25 billion.

As public concern continued to mount by ratepayers of private electric power companies, the Federal Trade Commission carried out extensive investigations between 1928 and 1935. The commission's 48,000-page report included entire volumes for each of the country's major utility companies. The FTC valued EBASCo and its five holding companies at $3.5 billion, along with major investments in dozens of other major U.S. companies. Within the five main holding companies were 121 U.S. subsidiaries, along with a foreign holding company that operated in 16 countries and had 70 subsidies.

Because he was a strong proponent of public power, Franklin D. Roosevelt used the collapse of Samuel Insull's Middle West Utilities electric empire in June 1932 as one of his most important election campaign issues. The failed assassination attempt on his life in February 1933 later became part of U.S. Marine Corps General Smedley Butler's claim of a Business Plot against Roosevelt by J. P. Morgan. On Roosevelt's first day in office, following his inauguration, he ordered the closure of the nation's banks, known as the bank holiday of 1933. In a joint session of the House and Senate, he pushed through the Emergency Banking Act along with Executive Order 6102 that blocked the hoarding of gold and stopped the major New York banks from taking gold supplies out of the country. Roosevelt then selected Ferdinand Pecora to investigate Morgan and the country's other major banks. Both Pecora and the Federal Trade Commission investigations exposed the fact that the electric industry was the most capital intensive industry. The May 24th, 1933 Pecora hearings rocked the country, focusing on J.P. Morgan and his financial empire, whose top lieutenants paid no taxes. In his 1939 book Wall Street Under Oath: The Story of Our Modern Money Changers, Ferdinand Pecora stated that "Undoubtedly, this small group of highly placed financiers, controlling the very springs of economic activity, holds more real power than any similar group in the United States."

The 1933 Pecora Commission hearings identified the National City Company, known today as Citibank, as the location where Morgan conducted EBASCo's investment operations, which played a prominent role in the passage of the Glass–Steagall legislation. The Pecaro investigation along with the findings from the seven-year Federal Trade Commission investigation into electric holding companies nationwide led to the passage of the Public Utility Holding Company Act of 1935. which some historians say was "the fiercest congressional battle in history." Following the act's passage, Ebasco sued the United States government claiming it was unconstitutional, but lost the case before the Supreme Court in 1938. Wendell Willkie, who was the president of one of J.P. Morgan and Ebasco's biggest investments, known as the Southern Company, ran against Franklin D. Roosevelt in the 1940 presidential race, but lost.

EBASCo, known on Wall Street as (EBS) was included in the Dow Jones Utility Average from 1938 to 1947.

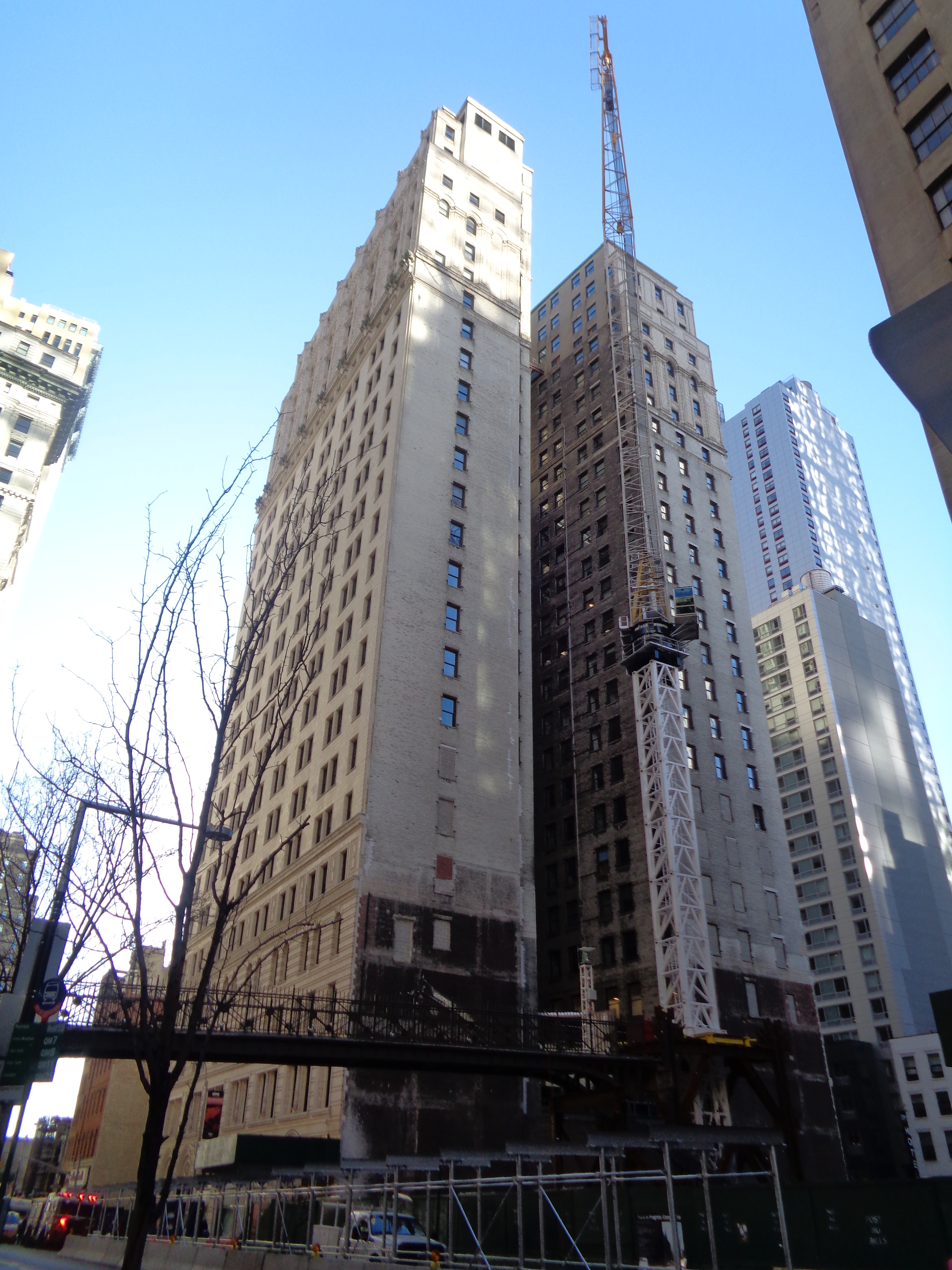
2 Rector Street NYC - Owned by Ebasco

=== Securities and Exchange Commission breakup of EBASCo ===
Following the passage of the Public Utility Holding Company Act of 1935, the U.S. Securities and Exchange Commission (SEC) oversaw the closure, re-organization or divestment of EBASCo's holding companies except for its American & Foreign Power Co., making annual reports on its monumental legal breakup case between 1936 and 1961. The act was used to break up the country's electric industry into regions confined by state boundaries so that state agencies could properly regulate each company. Each year, the SEC reported on the compliance status of the industry. As of 1949, 210 holding companies affecting 918 of the country's electric companies had come under the SEC's legal jurisdiction and procedures, with 46 holding companies still active. In its 1949 annual report, the SEC documented the history of their order for EBASCo to break up its five major holding companies' combined assets worth $3.5 billion.

In 1940, congressional investigations of brokerage firms, insurance companies and their relationship to the electric industry exposed that Middle South Utilities, the Southern Group and Ebasco were all financed by Morgan Stanley, with Wall Street having financial influence over nearly 80% of the country's electric industry.

Following the passage of the 1935 Act, Ebasco went into the U.S. court system in an attempt overturn the act but failed (see external links for major court cases). Ebasco was then required to register its holding companies and comply with SEC orders. On August 23, 1941, its holding company known as the National Power & Light Co. was ordered to break up its 27 subsidiaries. On March 22, 1949, the SEC signed off on the final breakup of National that included major holdings in Pennsylvania PPL Corporation, the Carolinas and Alabama (see subsidiary list).

On August 22, 1942, the SEC ordered the breakup of Ebasco's holding companies known as American Power & Light Corp. that included 35 subsidiaries and the Electric Power & Light Corporation with its 24 subsidiaries. American appealed the ruling but lost before the U.S. Supreme Court on November 25, 1946. As of 1949, all but one of American's subsidiaries were in compliance. Electric Power and its sub-holding company United Gas Corporation finally agreed to its breakup on March 2, 1949. Electric Power was then re-organized as Middle South Utilities Inc. and is known today as Entergy.

In 1939, proceedings before the SEC were initiated to break up EBASCo's American Gas & Electric Company. On December 28, 1945, the agency agreed to allow it to retain control of its central region of subsidiaries in Indiana, Kentucky, Michigan, Ohio, Tennessee, Virginia, and West Virginia, if it let go of its companies in Pennsylvania and New Jersey. In 1946, it attempted to acquire the Continental Gas & Electric Corp. but was denied. American Gas & Electric Company was finally spun off in 1958 to become American Electric Power (AEP).

As part of a national campaign to deregulate the electric industry, the Bush administration and Congress passed the Energy Policy Act of 2005 that repealed the 1935 Public Utility Holding Company Act.

=== EBASCo holding companies prior to 1935 ===
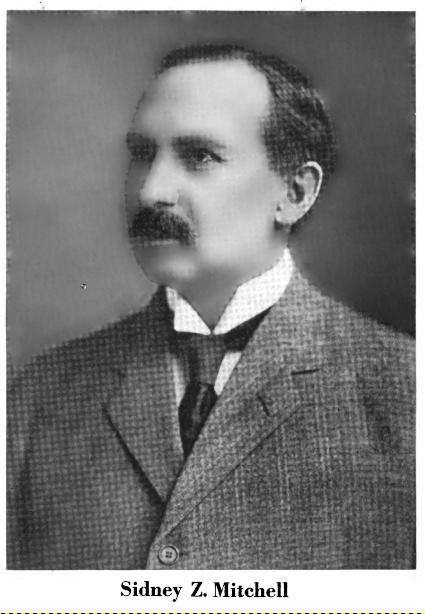
1905-1933 President of EBASCo

The following EBASCo holding companies, which includes some of its subsidiaries came under enforcement by the Securities and Exchange Commission with the passage of the Public Utilities Holding Company Act of 1935.

==== American Gas & Electric Company ====
Incorporated in 1906, and controlled by EBASCo., American Gas & Electric Company was finally spun off in 1958 and became American Electric Power. AEP currently serves over 5 million electricity customers in eleven states. It is currently the 6th largest gas & electric company in the United States. Check the reference here for a recent list of AEP's subsidiaries.

- Appalachian Electric Power Co. - Known today as Appalachian Power
- Ohio Power Co. - Known today as AEP Ohio
- Indiana & Michigan Electric Co. - known today as Indiana Michigan Power
- The Scranton Electric Co. was sold to PPL Corporation in 1956
- Atlantic City Elec. Co. - Is currently a subsidiary of Exelon
- Ky. & W. Va. Power Co. - known today as Kentucky Power
- Wheeling Electric Co. - is currently a subsidiary of AEP
- Indiana General Service Co.
- Kingsport Utilities, Inc. - known today as Kingsport Power Company

==== American Power & Light Company ====
American Power & Light had over 35 subsidiaries prior to 1935. In 1942, the Securities and Exchange Commission ordered the holding company to be broken up, which was completed by 1951. Many of these companies are still in existence today.

- Citizens Power & Light Co., Council Bluffs, Iowa. Merged into Nebraska Power in 1937.
- Central Arizona Light & Power Co., Phoenix, Arizona, merged with Arizona Edison in 1952 to form Arizona Public Service
- Florida Power & Light Co., Miami, Florida. It is a subsidiary of NextEra Energy Resources
- Fort Worth Power & Light Co., Fort Worth, Texas. Became part of TU Electric in 1984.
- Helena Gas & Electric Co., Helena, Montana.
- Kansas Gas & Electric Co., general office, Wichita, Kansas, merged with Kansas Power and Light of Topeka in 1992 to form Westar Energy
- Minnesota Power & Light Co., general office, Duluth, Minnesota. Still operating today as Minnesota Power as a subsidiary of Allete.
- Missoula Public Service Co., Missoula, Montana, acquired by Montana Power Company in 1929
- Montana Power Company, Butte, Montana. is still operating today.
- Nebraska Power Co., Omaha, Nebraska. Acquired by the Omaha Public Power District.
- Northern Power Co., Superior, Wisconsin.
- Northwestern Electric Co., Portland, Oregon. Merged into Pacific Power & Light in 1947.
- Pacific Power & Light Co., Portland, Oregon. is known today as PacifiCorp and owned by Berkshire Hathaway Energy.
- Portland Gas & Coke Co., Portland, Oregon. Now known as NW Natural.
- St. Augustine Co., St. Augustine, Florida.
- Superior Water, Light & Power Co., Superior, Wisconsin. Still operating today as a subsidiary of Allete.
- Texas Electric Service Co., Dallas, Texas. Became part of TU Electric in 1984.
- Texas Power & Light Co., Dallas, Texas. Became part of TU Electric in 1984.
- Texas Public Utilities Corp., Dallas, Texas. Became part of TU Electric.
- Washington Water Power Co. (The), group, Spokane, Washington is known today as Avista.

==== Electric Power & Light Corporation ====
Incorporated in 1925 as a holding company for various Electric Bond & Shares Co. subsidiaries. The SEC ordered it sold off, a process that was completed in 1949, when it was renamed as Mid South Utilities, Inc. Today, it is known as Entergy.

- Arkansas Power & Light Co., Little Rock, Arkansas.
- Dallas Power & Light Cd. Dallas, Texas.
- Idaho Power Co., Boise, Idaho.
- Louisiana Gas & Fuel Co., Shreveport, Louisiana.
- Louisiana Power & Light Co., New Orleans, Louisiana.
- Mississippi Central Power Co., Jackson, Mississippi.
- Mississippi Power & Light Co., Jackson, Mississippi.
- Nevada Power Co., Boise, Idaho.
- New Orleans Public Service Inc., New Orleans, Louisiana.
- Salmon River Power & Light Co., Boise, Idaho.
- Utah Light & Traction Co., Salt Lake City, Utah.
- Utah Power & Light Co., Salt Lake City, Utah.
- Western Colorado Power Co., Durango, Colorado.

==== National Power & Light Company ====
Incorporated 1925 as new holding company for various Electric Bond & Shares Co. subsidiaries. As part of the SEC's order, National Power was combined with Lehigh Power Securities with most of its other companies broken up. Today, National Power is known today as PPL Corporation

- Birmingham Electric Co., Birmingham, Alabama.
- Carolina Power & Light Co., Raleigh, North Carolina
- Holston River Electric Corporation, Rogersville, Tennessee.
- Houston Lighting & Power Co., Houston, Texas.
- Knoxville Power & Light Co., Knoxville, Tennessee.
- Memphis Power & Light Co., Memphis, Tennessee.
- South Texas Utilities Co., Houston, Texas.
- Tennessee Public Service Co., Newport, Tennessee.
- West Tennessee Power & Light Co., Jackson, Tennessee.

==== Lehigh Power Securities Corporation ====
The Lehigh Power Securities Company was merged with EBASCo's National Power & Light Company.

- Pennsylvania Power & Light Co., Allentown, Pennsylvania. - PPL Corporation today.
- Lancaster Group, Edison Electric Co., Lancaster, Pennsylvania.
- Transit Group, Lehigh Valley Transit Co., Allentown, Pennsylvania.

==== American & Foreign Power Company ====
Following the failed merger negotiations with Canada's Royal Securities Corporation, American & Foreign Power Co. was created as a wholly owned EBASCo holding company in 1923 that had the goal of owning electric companies worldwide. With its agenda of enforcing patents, General Electric (GE) had been buying up electric stocks worldwide, but also started taking control of companies via its equipment sales and other services formerly performed by its holding company, the Electric Bond and Share Group. In 1917, Electric Bond and Share Group's first major foreign electric acquisition, at the request of the U.S. government, to take control of electric production for two cities near the Panama Canal as a counter strategy against nearby German interests. In 1920, Electric Bond obtained control of Guatemalan electric facilities that the U.S. government had seized from Germany during the war. This was followed in 1922 by a dramatic burst of purchasing across central and South America that was followed the next year by the formation of the American & Foreign Power Company.

In 1925, GE would dispose of its Ebasco stocks because of negative public opinion, however GE's chairman continued to sit on American & Foreign Power's board of directors while its founding president Sydney Z. Mitchell also stayed as president. In 1929 American & Foreign Power claimed to have worldwide assets of $750 million. By 1931 the holding company was supplying power to just under 1,000 communities around the world. Following the passage of the Public Utility Holding Company Act of 1935, Ebasco was allowed to retain control of American & Foreign Power Company as the law only applied to U.S. based electric utility companies.

Electric development in Cuba is of unique historic concern. Following the Spanish–American War in 1898 the country was forced into an exclusive relationship with the United States. The U. S. allowed Cuba to be independent, but required it to operate under the Platt Amendment of 1901, turning it into an exclusive U.S. plantation colony with its sugar exports only allowed to be marketed in the U.S. Business interests deployed a combination of Scientific racism and Scientific management practices that left the country exclusively in the hands of American companies.

It started in 1922 with GE's representative, Henry Catlin purchasing General Gerardo Machado's electric company and then donating $500,000 to the general's successful bid to become Cuba's president in 1924. GE would spend $100 million to purchase control of Cuba's entire electric infrastructure. This led to 40 years of societal stresses, years of military dictatorships, the infamous U.S. Mafia operations in Havana and the Cuban Revolution which allowed Cuba to nationalize American & Foreign Power's control of the country's electric utilities.

American & Foreign Power Company also had operations in the following countries:

- Argentina - 100 different electric companies
- Brazil
- Canada - British Columbia Power Corporation
- Chile - all major electric utilities
- China - 1929 Shanghai Power Company purchased for $32 million
- Colombia
- Costa Rica
- Cuba - Cuba Electric Co. taken public by Cuba in 1960
- Ecuador
- Guatemala
- India
- Italy - Italian Superpower Corporation
- Japan - Two Companies
- Mexico
- Panama - 1917 purchased two companies at the request of the U.S. around the Panama Canal
- Venezuela

=== Dixon-Yates Affair ===
With the election of President Eisenhower in 1952 as the first republican to hold office in 20 years, a major policy shift called "no new starts" began. All federal water and power projects that had been closely tied to local, state or federal ownership were ended. The scale of this policy shift was exposed with the Dixon-Yates affair, identifying the plan's source as the Pacific Gas & Electric Company. PG&E was known for getting conservative politicians to kill all funding to the massive Central Valley Project's grid, forcing the U.S. Bureau of Reclamation to rely on the company to deliver the electricity. As a result, cooperatives in communities across northern California that were set up to get the low cost surplus power collapsed.

In 1954, President Eisenhower ordered the Atomic Energy Commission to buy 600,000 kilowatts of electricity for its Oak Ridge National Laboratory from two private electric companies rather than purchase power from the Tennessee Valley Authority in what is known as the Dixon-Yates contract. The attempt to bypass TVA's public power system next door to Oak Ridge stirred a national scandal following the testimony of James D Stietenroth, the secretary-treasurer of Mississippi Power & Light Company, who said that Middle South Utilities was still dominated by Ebasco Services. Stietenroth was fired the next day. Following the release of a secret report by industry insiders meant only for the president's eyes, Eisenhower was forced to cancel the contract on July 11, 1955.

In 1961, after 26 years of legal cases, Electric Bond and Share had complied with the SEC's orders and was no longer listed as an electric power holding company. In 1967, Electric Bond and Share merged with its former holding company, the American & Foreign Power Co. and was renamed Ebasco Industries the following year. Ebasco Industries held onto Ebasco Services Inc. as a subsidiary.

=== Ebasco Services ===
On November 27, 1935, the Electric Bond & Share Company setup Ebasco Services to manage its holding company empire, the day after the SEC filed a lawsuit ordering the company to register as a holding company as required by the passage of the Public Utility Company Holding Company Act. According to the asbestos legal case of FENICLE v. BOISE CASCADE COMPANY, Boise Cascade purchased control of Ebasco Industries and its subsidiary Ebasco Services in 1969. The Plaintiff's suit was countered by a legal maneuver called Piercing the corporate veil. In 1973 Halliburton purchased Ebasco Services from Boise Cascade, but the Justice Department reversed the sale over concerns that it gave Halliburton control over too much of the industry's engineering expertise.

By the mid-1970s, Ebasco had stepped beyond its 1961 filing with the SEC, claiming its intention of becoming an investment company. It was now actively involved with the construction of nuclear and fossil fuel power facilities. In 1976, according to Encyclopedia.com a Texas oil company named Ensearch acquired Ebasco. Ensearch was originally known as Texas Power & Light Co. and had been one of Ebasco's original subsidiaries prior to 1935, that is now TXU Energy. By 1980, EBASCO had three divisions: A/E Ebasco Services, Ebasco Environmental, which provided environmental services, and Ebasco Engineering and Construction. On November 16, 1982, according to a filing made with the Texas Secretary of state, Ebasco Engineering and Construction filed as a foreign for-profit company. Ebasco Environmental was sold to Foster Wheeler, Inc., becoming Foster Wheeler Environmental.

Ebasco had become one of the major US architect-engineers, coordinating the design of many nuclear power plants both in the US and abroad. On May 22, 1956, Ebasco's subsidiary, American & Foreign Power Co. announced plans to build two nuclear power facilities in Latin America, very likely in Cuba since they held 100% of the country's electric production. Other major nuclear construction plans included the Fukushima Daiichi Nuclear Power Plant (units 1, 2 and 6). It also had the original contract to design and build the Bataan Nuclear station in the Philippines, but was replaced by Westinghouse. Ebasco's involvement with the financial collapse of the Washington Public Power Supply System's (WPPSS) massive five nuclear reactors led to a lawsuit against the company in 1992 over asbestos contamination.

Raytheon acquired Ebasco in 1994 and was known as Raytheon Ebasco Overseas Ltd. At this time, Ebasco was known to have subsidiaries in 11 foreign countries. The Raytheon subsidiary, Raytheon Engineers & Constructors that owned Ebasco Services was later sold to Morrison Knudsen Corporation where the combined company was named the Washington Group International, Inc., a firm with more than $5 billion in annual revenues and a backlog of some $6.6 billion, marking it one of the largest in the engineering and construction industry at that time with more than 38,000 employees at work in more than 40 countries. Washington Group International, which filed for Chapter 11 bankruptcy in 2001. At the time of the filing, there were four known Ebasco entities involved in the bankruptcy that included the Delaware-based Ebasco International Corporation. The Washington Group's headquarters were at the World Trade Center in 2001. Ebasco had been at the WTC since 1980 and at one point was its largest tenant with over 2,000 employees, leasing over 600,000 sq. ft. There were less than 20 employees of the 180 still at the World Trade Center on 911. In 2007 Washington Group was purchased by URS Corporation, which was purchased by AECOM in 2014 that is now one of the largest engineering firms in the world.

Following the 2007 takeover of TXU Corp., which included plans to construct two new next generation nuclear power stations at Commanche Peak, the company eventually ran into further financial difficulties and filed for bankruptcy in 2014. On February 27, 2018, Energy Futures Holdings (EFH), formerly known as TXU Corp., which was one of Ebasco's pre-1935 subsidiaries came out of bankruptcy reorganization as TXU Energy. EFH had a subsidiary known as EEC Holdings which owned Ebasco Canada Ltd. that was incorporated in Delaware. Ebasco Canada was shut down on April 29, 2014, as part of the EFH bankruptcy process.

According to a 2015 Sun Sentinel news story, Ebasco's American and Foreign Power Company is owned by another company - Office Depot. The article says that when Boise Cascade sold off Ebasco Services to Raytheon, it held onto American & Foreign Power Co.'s foreign investments. Boise Cascade purchased OfficeMax and took its name in 2003. According to the article, OfficeMax was then purchased by Office Depot in 2013, and was proposing to merge with Staples in 2015. One of the subsidiaries of American & Foreign Power Co. was the former Cuban Power Co. that has filed a $267.5 million claim against Cuba with the Foreign Claims Settlement Commission that still has thousands of investors holding stock in the nationalized company. The Office Depot and Staples merger was abandoned in 2016 after a judge blocked the plan.

In 2016, The Indian subsidiary Raytheon Ebasco Overseas Ltd. appeared in an Indian court over Tax problems.

Meanwhile, the Dutch registered CT Corporation is listing itself as the agent for Ebasco in 43 states and the District of Columbia. See Boise Cascade v. United States for more background on the activities of Ebasco Industries.

In addition, The law firm of Reid and Priest used to be part of the army of lawyers that failed to stop Ebasco from being dismantled. It became part of Reid, Priest and Thelen LLP which also just dissolved.

Today there is a company Named Ebasco Trading Co. listed in Dubai. Its unknown what its relationship is to the original company.

See Ebasco Services for its whistle-blowing problems. See External links for a list of major legal cases Ebasco has been involved in. Note that this list is no where exhaustive since the company was constantly caught up in legal cases against its own employees, insurance companies and regulatory oversight agencies nationwide.

The Public Utilities Holding Company Act of 1935 was repealed by the Energy Policy Act of 2005
