= List of United States Supreme Court cases by the Hughes Court =

Supreme Court of the United States
Hughes Court
- Taft Court ← → Stone Court
- February 24, 1930 – June 30, 1941 (11 years, 126 days)
- Seat: Old Senate Chamber (1930–35); Supreme Court Building (1935–41); Washington, D.C.
- No. of positions: 9
- Hughes Court decisions

This is a partial chronological list of cases decided by the United States Supreme Court during the Hughes Court, the tenure of Chief Justice Charles Evans Hughes from February 24, 1930 through June 30, 1941.

Case name	Citation	Summary
Lucas v. Earl	281 U.S. 111 (1930)	origin of Assignment of income doctrine, contract to divide income between husband and wife
United States v. Sprague	282 U.S. 716 (1931)	Tenth Amendment
McBoyle v. United States	283 U.S. 25 (1931)	National Motor Vehicle Theft Act held not to apply to aircraft
Stromberg v. California	283 U.S. 359 (1931)	constitutionality of California red flag-banning statute, freedom of symbolic speech
Burnet v. Logan	283 U.S. 404 (1931)	Cost basis must be recovered before taxpayer realizes any taxable income
Near v. Minnesota	283 U.S. 697 (1931)	freedom of speech, prior restraints
United States v. Kirby Lumber Co.	284 U.S. 1 (1931)	taxation of gain on reduction of debt
Blackmer v. United States	284 U.S. 421 (1932)	International law and 5th Amendment allowed U.S. government to retain jurisdiction over its citizens abroad
Blockburger v. United States	284 U.S. 299 (1932)	standard for double jeopardy
Crowell v. Benson	285 U.S. 22 (1932)	upholding adjudication of private rights by an administrative agency, not an Article III court
New State Ice Co. v. Liebmann	285 U.S. 262 (1932)	substantive due process
Smiley v. Holm	285 U.S. 355 (1932)	Governors may veto electoral redistricting plans
Nixon v. Condon	286 U.S. 73 (1932)	White primaries in Texas violated Equal Protection Clause
North American Oil Consolidated v. Burnet	286 U.S. 417 (1932)	claim of right doctrine in U.S. tax law
Powell v. Alabama	287 U.S. 45 (1932)	access to counsel
Sorrells v. United States	287 U.S. 435 (1932)	Entrapment recognized as a valid defense
Vermont v. New Hampshire	289 U.S. 593 (1933)	clarified the location of the boundary between the two states
Home Building & Loan Association v. Blaisdell	290 U.S. 398 (1934)	Minnesota's suspension of creditor's remedies did not violate the Contract Clause
Burroughs v. United States	290 U.S. 534 (1934)	upholding the constitutionality of the Federal Corrupt Practices Act
Nebbia v. New York	291 U.S. 502 (1934)	Substantive Due Process, economic regulation
Panama Refining Co. v. Ryan	293 U.S. 388 (1935)	delegation of authority, New Deal
Gregory v. Helvering	293 U.S. 465 (1935)	tax law, business purpose doctrine
Schechter Poultry Corp. v. United States	295 U.S. 495 (1935)	interstate commerce, New Deal
Humphrey's Executor v. United States	295 U.S. 602 (1935)	administrative action, separation of powers
Pacific States Box & Basket Co. v. White	296 U.S. 176 (1935)	early case on standard of review for regulations
Fox Film Corp. v. Muller	296 U.S. 207 (1935)	contract dispute, "adequate and independent state ground"
United States v. Constantine	296 U.S. 287 (1935)	taxation of liquor
United States v. Butler	297 U.S. 1 (1936)	Taxation power, Tenth Amendment
Grosjean v. American Press Co.	297 U.S. 233 (1936)	Freedom of the press, taxation of newspapers
Brown v. Mississippi	297 U.S. 278 (1936)	coerced confessions by means of violence
Wallace v. Cutten	298 U.S. 229 (1936)	application of the Grain Futures Act
Valentine v. United States	299 U.S. 5 (1936)	extradition powers of the executive branch
Bourdieu v. Pacific Western Oil Co.	299 U.S. 65 (1936)	U.S. government as an indispensable party
United States v. Curtiss-Wright Export Corp.	299 U.S. 304 (1936)	export restrictions, Presidential power over international commerce
De Jonge v. Oregon	299 U.S. 353 (1937)	14th Amendment applied to freedom of assembly
West Coast Hotel Co. v. Parrish	300 U.S. 379 (1937)	freedom of contract, minimum wage laws; "the switch in time that saved nine"
National Labor Relations Board v. Jones & Laughlin Steel Corporation	301 U.S. 1 (1937)	interstate commerce; another consequence of "the switch in time that saved nine"
Steward Machine Company v. Davis	301 U.S. 548 (1937)	Court upholds the unemployment insurance provisions of the Social Security Act
Bogardus v. Commissioner	302 U.S. 34 (1937)	distinction between taxable compensation and tax-exempt gifts under the Internal Revenue Code
Palko v. Connecticut	302 U.S. 319 (1937)	selective incorporation, double jeopardy
Connecticut General Life Insurance Company v. Johnson	303 U.S. 77 (1938)	
Lovell v. City of Griffin	303 U.S. 444 (1938)	City ordinance requiring official permission to distribute literature held unconstitutionally broad
New Negro Alliance v. Sanitary Grocery Co.	303 U.S. 552 (1938)	safeguard right to boycott and chips away at discriminatory hiring practices against African Americans
Hale v. Kentucky	303 U.S. 613 (1938)	exclusion of African Americans from juries
Erie Railroad Co. v. Tompkins	304 U.S. 64 (1938)	limiting general federal common law by requiring that state law apply except where federal law exists
Hinderlider v. La Plata River & Cherry Creek Ditch	304 U.S. 92 (1938)	reaffirming existence of federal common law in other cases
United States v. Carolene Products Co.	304 U.S. 144 (1938)	interstate commerce, substantive due process, and (in footnote four) equal protection
NLRB v. Mackay Radio & Telegraph Co.	304 U.S. 333 (1938)	Striking workers continue to be employees within the meaning of the National Labor Relations Act, but use of strikebreakers is permissible
Johnson v. Zerbst	304 U.S. 458 (1938)	Sixth Amendment right to counsel in federal criminal cases
Collins v. Yosemite Park & Curry Co.	304 U.S. 518 (1938)	Twenty-first Amendment and the enforcement of state liquor laws in U.S. national parks
Kellogg Co. v. National Biscuit Co.	305 U.S. 111 (1938)	patent holder has no remedy in unfair competition law against competitor selling similar goods under a non-trademarked name after patent expires—prelude to functionality doctrine
Missouri ex rel. Gaines v. Canada	305 U.S. 337 (1938)	chipping away at separate but equal education
United States v. Miller	307 U.S. 174 (1939)	Second Amendment, right to bear arms
Coleman v. Miller	307 U.S. 433 (1939)	length of time proposed Constitutional amendments remain pending
Hague v. CIO	307 U.S. 496 (1939)	labor unions and freedom of assembly
Schneider v. New Jersey	308 U.S. 147 (1939)	enforcement of littering ordinances and free speech
Chambers v. Florida	309 U.S. 227 (1940)	coerced confessions in a murder case
Helvering v. Bruun	309 U.S. 461 (1940)	A landlord realizes a taxable gain when he repossesses property improved by a tenant
Thornhill v. Alabama	310 U.S. 88 (1940)	free speech clause of First Amendment includes peaceful labor picketing
Cantwell v. Connecticut	310 U.S. 296 (1940)	incorporated Free Exercise Clause
United States v. American Trucking Associations	310 U.S. 534 (1940)	Motor Carrier Act of 1935 did not empower the Interstate Commerce Commission to regulate all employees of common and contract motor carriers, but rather only those whose duties affect safety of operation
Minersville School District v. Gobitis	310 U.S. 586 (1940)	saluting the flag
Hansberry v. Lee	311 U.S. 32 (1940)	res judicata may not bind a subsequent plaintiff who had no opportunity to be represented in the earlier civil action
Helvering v. Horst	311 U.S. 112 (1940)	refinement of assignment of income doctrine
Sibbach v. Wilson & Co.	312 U.S. 1 (1941)	Erie doctrine, applicability of Federal Rules of Civil Procedure
Railroad Commission v. Pullman Co.	312 U.S. 496 (1941)	Abstention doctrine
Cox v. New Hampshire	312 U.S. 569 (1941)	petitions on public property
United States v. Darby Lumber Co.	312 U.S. 100 (1941)	power of the United States Congress to regulate employment conditions; Commerce Clause
United States v. Classic	313 U.S. 299 (1941)	power of the federal government to regulate primary elections
