= Nardone =

Nardone is a surname of Italian (typical of Lazio) origin. Notable people with the surname include:

- Benito Nardone (1906–1964), Uruguayan journalist and political figure
- George Nardone (born 1964), American politician
- Giorgio Nardone (born 1958), Italian psychologist and psychotherapist
- Gilda E. Nardone, American women's employment advocate and nonprofit director
- Michael Nardone (born 1967), Scottish actor
- Olga C. Nardone (1921–2010), actress
- Peter Nardone (born 1965), Scottish countertenor, organist, choirmaster and composer

== Other ==
- Inspector Nardone (Italian: Il commissario Nardone), Italian television miniseries
- Nardone v. United States, a 1939 U.S. Supreme Court case
