= James Clark Strong =

American lawyer

Strong on his 84th birthday

James Clark Strong (May 26, 1826–1915) was a Union Army officer during the American Civil War and a prominent New York attorney in the post-war period. An advocate for Native Americans, he litigated That Portion of the Cayuga Indians Residing in Canada v. State (N.Y. 1885) and Seneca Nation of Indians v. Christy (U.S. 1896) on behalf of the Cayuga and Seneca, respectively, two of the earliest litigations of aboriginal title in New York.

== Early life ==
Strong was born on May 26, 1826, in Phelps, New York. Strong resided in the Washington Territory from 1847 to 1856.

Strong fought on the Union side during the American Civil War, rising to the rank of Colonel. Strong was badly wounded, developing a permanent limp. After the war, Strong was breveted to the rank of brigadier general. As the commanding officer of the 38th New York Infantry Regiment, Strong ordered the mustering of the unit out of service on June 22, 1863, in East New York, Brooklyn.

== Career ==
A lifelong Democrat before the war, Strong became a prominent member of the Republican Party after the war. Strong was a supporter of Ulysses Grant, and thus an opponent of Horace Greeley. In a well-published letter, Strong urged his fellow veterans to support Grant's re-election in the 1872 United States presidential election.

=== Legal career ===
After the war, Strong joined the law firm of his brother John C. Strong in Buffalo, New York. In 1879, he went into partnership with Henry W. Brendel and continued until 1891 when the firm was mutually dissolved. According to historian Laurence M. Hauptman, "Strong was a prominent lawyer and civic-minded resident of Buffalo." Strong omits any discussion of his law practice in his autobiography, jumping from his return to Buffalo on June 30, 1866—to "resume[] the duties of civic life"—to the fall of 1892 when he "went abroad and lectured through England on the North American Indian," on the same page.

As Strong concluded in his 1893 book,

The Red-men are fast passing away. The beautiful land of their nativity will soon known them no more. It is beyond our power to undo the wrongs inflicted upon them by our ancestors; but we can, and ought to be just—even generous—towards the few who are still with us. Let us hasten to remove from our national escutcheon its one foul blot—the stigma of inhumanity and injustice towards the proud but hapless Indian.

=== Cayuga claim ===
Strong represented the Cayuga people residing in Canada in a claim against New York state for a proportion of treaty annuities, which had not been paid since the 1809. With interest, the Cayuga's claim was valued at $400,000 to $500,000. The state Board of Claims rejected the claim, and Strong's petition for mandamus relief in the courts—which reached the New York Court of Appeals in 1885—was rejected on the grounds that the Canadian Cayugas were not a party to the treaty.

=== Seneca claim ===
Strong represented the Seneca Nation of Indians in an ejectment suit against Harrison Christy, one of the successors in title to the Phelps and Gorham Purchase, challenging the conveyance in violation of the Nonintercourse Act. The New York Court of Appeals rejected the claim, holding that the federal government had implicitly ratified the conveyances, that the states rather than the federal government had the power to extinguish aboriginal title, that the New York statute of limitations barred the action, and that the Nonintercourse Act did not apply to lands within the territory of a state. The U.S. Supreme Court cited the statute of limitations holding as an adequate and independent state ground and dismissed the writ of error.

== Personal life ==
Strong married Emily K. Strong, and they had three children: Jean D. Strong, Edward Clark Strong, and Stuart Efner Strong.

Strong moved to Los Gatos, California, in January 1896. Strong's 1910 autobiography was published in Los Gatos.

== Publications ==
- James Clark Strong, Wah-kee-nah and Her People (G.P. Putnam 1893).
- James Clark Strong, Biographical Sketch of James Clark Strong (1910).

== See also ==
- List of American Civil War brevet generals (Union)
