= Murdock v. City of Memphis =

- Supreme Court of the United States

Argued January 21, 1874 Reargued April 2–3, 1874 Decided January 11, 1875
- Full case name: Murdock v. City of Memphis
- Citations: 87 U.S. 590 (more) 20 Wall. 590; 22 L. Ed. 429; 1874 U.S. LEXIS 1451

Holding
- The Supreme Court affirmed the state court's decision on federal law, but would not consider the state court's decisions resting solely on state law.

Court membership
- Chief Justice Morrison Waite Associate Justices Nathan Clifford · Noah H. Swayne; Samuel F. Miller · David Davis; Stephen J. Field · William Strong; Joseph P. Bradley · Ward Hunt

Case opinions
- Majority: Miller, joined by Davis, Field, Strong, Hunt
- Dissent: Clifford, joined by Swayne
- Dissent: Bradley
- Waite took no part in the consideration or decision of the case.

Laws applied
- U.S. Const. Art. III, § 2. and Section 25 of Judiciary Act of 1789 as amended in 1867

Murdock v. City of Memphis, 87 U.S. (20 Wall.) 590 (1875), is a case decided by the United States Supreme Court.

William Tod Otto argued the case on behalf of the City of Memphis. Because the case was both argued originally and reargued before the appointment of Chief Justice Waite, he took no part in the judgment.

Murdock challenged on several grounds a state court's decision relating to land devised by Murdock's ancestors. The city's federal claim which was outcome determinative was that a federal statute created a trust for the land. The state court accepted this claim and the Supreme Court affirmed. Murdock, however, urged the Supreme Court to review the state court's findings on state law based on the Judiciary Act of 1867. The Supreme Court interpreted the Act as not conferring jurisdiction over the state claims, but the Court did not decide as a constitutional matter whether conferring such jurisdiction would be constitutional.

The Supreme Court continued to lay some ground rules for appeals of state court decisions, namely the effect of a state court decision resting on an adequate and independent state ground. While these rules were important in the development of adequate and independent state grounds doctrine in cases like Fox Film Corp. v. Muller and Michigan v. Long, they were merely dicta. The Court ultimately affirmed the decision of the state court on the federal law and did not decide the two issues of state law.

Murdock v. Memphis is cited today as instrumental in establishing the principle that interpretation of state law is the province of the state courts, and that, in particular, the state Supreme Courts, rather than the federal courts, have final jurisdiction in this area.
