= That Portion of the Cayuga Indians Residing in Canada v. State =

- Court: New York Court of Appeals
- Full case name: That Portion of the Cayuga Indians Residing in Canada v. State
- Argued: April 20 1885
- Decided: June 2 1885
- Citation: 99 N.Y. (54 Sickels) 235, 1 N.E. 770

Holding
- The Canadian Cayugas have no standing to sue under a treaty between New York state and the Cayuga nation

Court membership
- Chief judge: William C. Ruger
- Associate judges: Charles Andrews, George F. Danforth, Robert Earl, Francis Miles Finch, Theodore Miller, and Charles A. Rapallo

Case opinions
- Majority: Danforth, joined by unanimous (Finch concurred only in the result)

That Portion of the Cayuga Indians Residing in Canada v. State, 1 N.E. 770 (N.Y. 1885), was an early litigation of aboriginal title in New York, with the Canadian Cayugas seeking to recovery compensation from a prior land cession.

== Background ==
The Cayugas ceded 1,536,000 acres to the state in 1789 and 1795. The 30-mile-wide strip ran from Lake Ontario to Pennsylvania. In 1789, following the cession, many of the Cayugas relocated to Canada. In 1795, another group relocated to Ohio.

The Canadian Cayugas, led by chief O-ja-gegh-ti, sought to recover, plus 72 years of interest, a portion of a $2,300 perpetual annuity that New York had only been paying to Cayugas residing in New York and Ohio, pursuant to a 1796 treaty written on deerskin—or two treaties dated 1789 and 1795, or two treaties dated 1790 and 1795—and reaffirmed in the 1814 Treaty of Ghent (which ended the War of 1812).

The Canadian Cayugas had not received payments since 1809, by 1884, and sought total compensation of $83,000 or $100,000, and by 1885, $400,000 or $500,000.

The Board of Land Commissioners reported to the state legislature in 1849, recommending that the claim be paid. The legislature took no action.

== Prior history ==
The claim was filed before the "board of audit" in February 1883, and later transferred to the Board of Claims by statute.

The claim was heard by the Board of Claims on December 6, 1883. The hearing was presided over by Commissioner Lyman H. Northup, joined by George M. Beebe, and Henry F. Allen. The state was represented by Deputy Attorney General James A. Dennison.

The state moved to dismiss, and the Board did not rule on the motion before closing its session on December 8.

Canadian Cayuga Isaac Davis visited the United States Commissioner, James C. Strong (who, in private practice, would later litigate Seneca Nation of Indians v. Christy), who was representing the Cayugas in connection with the claim, on May 4, 1884 to discuss the status of the still-pending claim. New York Attorney General Denis O'Brien had set the second hearing before the Board and himself for the following Tuesday, with Davis and Gen. Strong set to appear.

The Attorney General and the Board of Claims rejected the claim. In the aftermath, the Board of Commissioners of the Land Office determined that they were not competent to act on the matter. The Canadian Cayugas, still represented by Gen. Strong, sought mandamus relief from the Board's decision in the New York Supreme Court in Albany. The matter was argued in early August 1884. Justice Peckham affirmed the Board on August 5.

Gen. Strong appealed the decision to the New York Supreme Court, General Term in Albany. The General Term reversed in March 1885, entering an order that the claim be paid. The state appealed to the New York Court of Appeals.

The case was argued before the Court of Appeals on April 20, by Gen. Strong and O'Brien. The state's main argument was that the determination of which Cayugas were entitled to receive the annuity was a political question reserved to the legislature. Gen. Strong argued that the treaty should be treated like an ordinary contract. The Cayuga's claim was valued at $448,000 when the Court of Appeals heard the case.

== Opinion ==
James Clark Strong, the Canadian Cayuga's lawyer

The Court of Appeals held that the state courts had no jurisdiction to issue a writ of mandamus against the Board because the court held that the plaintiffs were not the proper party to enforce the treaty:

The title to the proceeding indicates that, whoever the claimants are, they have no personal, nor even associate, character; they assume to represent no one, and it is not pretended that they are authorized by statute to sue. If we look below the title we find the cause of action is a treaty stipulation between "The State of New York" and "The Cayuga Nation of Indians" ... [I]f [the treaty is] violated by either, the other contracting party can alone demand satisfaction; and neither a citizen of the state nor a member of the "Indian Nation," nor any portion of these members, unless recognized by the state as such, can complain.

In a separate opinion, the Court of Appeals gave additional reasons. This additional opinion, also authored by Justice Danforth, was joined by Chief Justice Ruger and Justice Miller; Justice Earl concurred in the result; Justice Finch dissented; Justices Rapallo and Andrews did not vote. First, the court held that the Canadian Cayugas were not a party to the treaty:

The commissioners may deal with a part or portion or party of a nation of Indians in respect to certain matters, but the relators are in error in supposing that they are such part or portion within the meaning or intent of the statute ... There are parts or portions of the Cayuga nation so recognized, but the relators are not. The treaties of 1789, 1790, and 1795 were with the nation of Indians called the Cayugas. So was the treaty of 1829, although the Cayugas were described as residing at Sandusky, in the state of Ohio. The treaty of 1831 described one portion of the Cayuga nation as residing at Sandusky, and another portion as residing on the Seneca reservation, near Buffalo, and the annuities agreed upon in 1789 and 1795 were then to be in the future divided between them in certain proportions. The treaties of May and July, 1846, are described as being between ‘that portion of the tribe or nation of Indians called the Cayuga Indians residing in the western part of the state of New York, of one part, and the state of New York, of the other ... The relators seem unknown to the state, and I do not find that they have in any manner or at any time been recognized as a "part" or "portion" of the Cayuga nation of Indians. If this is so, they had no standing before the commissioners of the land-office.

Second, the court held that "[t]he action of the commissioners in the premises was entirely legislative ... They have no judicial functions ..." Third, the court held that even if the Board has some judicial functions, an action to "order a new distribution" of the annuity would be legislative rather than judicial.

== Aftermath ==
Gen. Strong took the Cayuga's case to the legislature. In 1887, two bills were introduced, one in each house, to provide compensation to the Canadian Cayugas for back annuities. Each provided for the method of distribution to be determined by a special committee; neither Bill passed.

In February 1888, Gen. Strong lobbied the legislature to appoint a single Commissioner to treat with the Canadian Cayugas and enter into a settlement that could be approved by the Governor. By this time, the claim for $400,000 had been dropped.
