= Rubber-Tip Pencil Co. v. Howard =

- Supreme Court of the United States
- Full case name: Rubber-Tip Pencil Co. v. Howard
- Citations: 87 U.S. 498 (more) 20 Wall. 498; 22 L. Ed. 410; 1874 U.S. LEXIS 1439

Case opinion
- Majority: Waite, joined by unanimous

Rubber-Tip Pencil Co. v. Howard, 87 U.S. (20 Wall.) 498 (1874), is an 1874 decision of the United States Supreme Court concerning the patent eligibility of abstract ideas. As explained below in the Subsequent developments section, it is intermediate in the development of that aspect of patent law from Neilson v Harford, through O'Reilly v. Morse, to Funk Bros. Seed Co. v. Kalo Inoculant Co., and then to Parker v. Flook, Mayo Collaborative Servs. v. Prometheus Labs., Inc., and Alice Corp. v. CLS Bank Int'l.

The Rubber-Tip Pencil case has frequently been cited in the subsequent Supreme Court decisions concerning the patent eligibility of computer-related claimed inventions, such as Alice Corp. v. CLS Bank, Diamond v. Diehr, Parker v. Flook, and Gottschalk v. Benson,

== Background ==
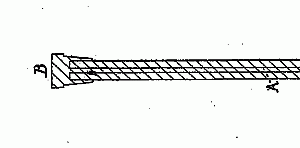
Cross-sectional drawing of rubber-tip pencil in patent on that product – U.S. Pat. No. 66,938. "A" designates pencil; "B" designates eraser.

Lead pencils and rubber erasers were known for a long time. Up until the time of the invention, pencils and erasers were separate products. In 1867 it occurred to Blair, a poor artist in Philadelphia, that it would be more convenient to him if he combined pencil and eraser into one unit so that the eraser would readily be at hand when he needed it to correct his drawings as he made them. He made a hole in a piece of rubber, slightly smaller than the size of his pencil, and stuck the pencil into the hole. The eraser stayed fastened to the pencil, because, as "everybody knew . . if a solid substance was inserted into a cavity in a piece of rubber smaller than itself, the rubber would cling to it." Blair applied for a patent, which issued July 23d, 1867, as U.S. Pat. No. 66,938

Millions of rubber-tipped pencils were then sold. Blair assigned his rights to the Rubber-Tip Pencil Co. The defendant Howard made rubber-tipped pencils like those covered by the patent, so the company filed a bill in equity in the circuit court in New York, to enjoin him.

== Ruling of the circuit court ==
The circuit court denied relief. It said the patented article consists "of a piece of India rubber, with a hole in it." The court stated:

Such an article cannot be the subject of a patent The elastic and erasive properties of India-rubber were known to all . . . ; and how to make a piece of rubber encompass and adhere to another article, was known to every person who had ever seen a rubber shoe. No person knowing of the elastic quality of rubber, could be wanting in the knowledge that a piece of rubber could be made to encompass and adhere to a pencil, ink eraser, or other article of similar character, by making a hole in it, nor could anyone be deficient in the skill requisite to make such a hole.

The court, therefore, concluded that "the patent in question cannot be upheld, for want of invention," and dismissed the bill. The company then appealed to the Supreme Court.

== Proceedings in Supreme Court ==
=== Argument for Rubber-Tip Pencil Co. ===
Counsel for the Rubber-Tip company made this argument"

Lead-pencils have very long — longer than any living man remembers — been used to make marks. India-rubber has very long — longer than any living man remembers — been used to rub them out. But never until lately was India-rubber used for this purpose except in a form disconnected from the pencil. But on a summer's morning of 1867, one Blair, a poor artist of Philadelphia, seeing that it will be more convenient to use it on his pencil than off, puts in a certain way, a piece of a certain shape, on the pencil, and finding a great advantage in thus using such a piece, shows what he has done.

Behold! thousands, hundreds of thousands and millions of rubber-tipped pencils at once appear. Very rich companies, like the Rubber-Tip Pencil Company, are incorporated. Great capital is invested in the matter, and rubber-tipped pencils become a manufacture of the nation.

How can it be said that there is no invention here? So far as the patent laws are concerned, utility, as ascertained by the consequences of what is done, is the test of invention, and when utility is proved to exist in any great degree, a sufficiency of invention to support the patent must be presumed. In such a case it is vain to talk about the small amount of ingenuity shown or to say that the arrangement and application are so simple and obvious that anybody could see them.

=== Ruling of Supreme Court ===
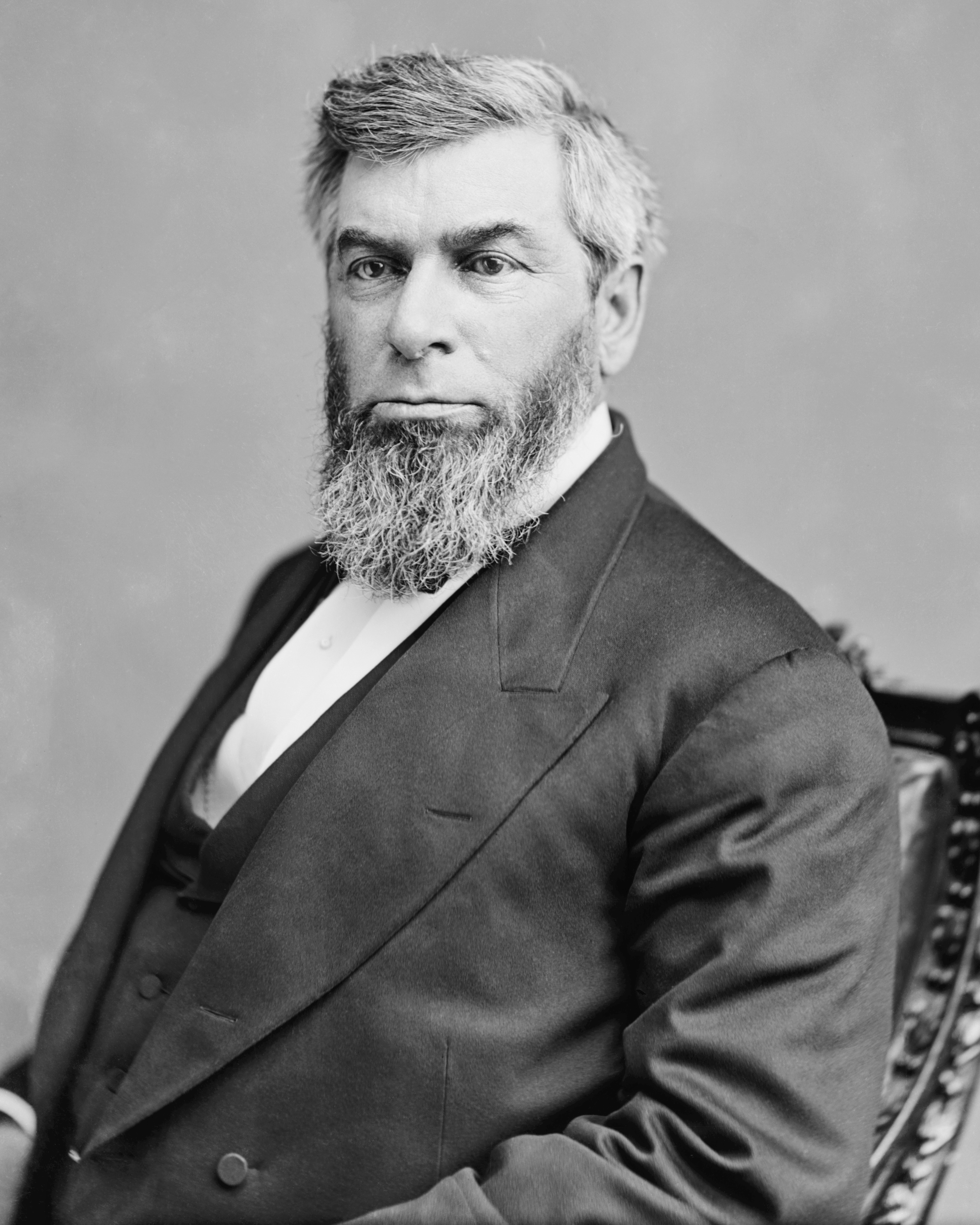
Justice Waite

Writing for a unanimous Court, Chief Justice Morrison Waite began by ascertaining what the claimed invention was. It was not for the external form of the device described. Rather:

[I]t is very evident that the essential element of the invention as understood by the patentee was the facility provided for attaching the [rubber] head to the pencil. The prominent idea in the mind of the inventor clearly was the form of the attachment, not of the head.

The Court then turned to the piece of rubber with a hole in it: "the cavity must be made smaller than the pencil and so constructed as to encompass its sides and be held thereon by the inherent elasticity of the rubber." But that "adds nothing to the patentable character of the invention." The reason was:

Everybody knew when the patent was applied for that if a solid substance was inserted into a cavity in a piece of rubber smaller than itself, the rubber would cling to it. The small opening in the piece of rubber not limited in form or shape was not patentable, neither was the elasticity of the rubber. What, therefore, is left for this patentee but the idea that if a pencil is inserted into a cavity in a piece of rubber smaller than itself the rubber will attach itself to the pencil, and when so attached become convenient for use as an eraser?

That idea was the invention. But, the Court reasoned, an idea cannot be patented—only its mechanical application can be patented. Yet here the method of mechanical application was old and well known:

An idea of itself is not patentable, but a new device by which it may be made practically useful is. The idea of this patentee was a good one, but his device to give it effect, though useful, was not new. Consequently, he took nothing by his patent.

== Subsequent developments ==
=== Earlier case law ===
In Neilson (1841), the court recognized that an idea as such could not be patented while an apparatus exploiting an idea could be patented, but it did not address or consider whether the implementation was inventive or conventional. In that case, the underlying principle was that heating the air blast before introducing it into a blast furnace made for better iron. That principle could not be patented, but the implementation utilized to exploit the principle could be patented. The implementation, in that case, was a heated metal box interposed between the source of air and the furnace into which the heated air was injected.

In Morse (1853), the Court recognized the same legal principle against patenting ideas, found one of Morse's claims to impermissibly preempt an abstract idea since it was not limited to any particular apparatus, mentioned that Morse's actual apparatus was the product of great ingenuity on his part and upheld a claim to it, but did not hold or even state that ingenuity of the apparatus implementation was a requirement.

=== Rubber-Tip case ===
In the Rubber-Tip Pencil case (1874), the Court said that the inventor had a good idea and a useful one, but his implementation of the idea merely used expedients that "everybody knew" already, and therefore the inventor "took nothing by his patent". The Court did not provide any explanation of what was requisite for a patent on a good and useful idea, other than that novelty was required.

=== Subsequent case law ===
In Funk (1948), the Court said ideas (natural principles) could not be patented and that the device utilized in that case "may have been the product of skill, [but] it certainly was not the product of invention"; yet, the Court did not yet state in terms that the key to patenting the implementation of an idea is inventive implementation.

In Flook (1978), Mayo (2012), and Alice (2014), the Court expressly held that abstract ideas could not be patented and their implementations could be patented only when the implementations were inventive rather than routine or conventional. The last three cases represent the present state of US law on this point.
