= List of United States Supreme Court cases, volume 296 =

Supreme Court of the United States
- Interactive map of Supreme Court of the United States
- 38°53′26″N 77°00′16″W
- Established: March 4, 1789; 236 years ago
- Location: Washington, D.C.
- Coordinates: 38°53′26″N 77°00′16″W
- Composition method: Presidential nomination with Senate confirmation
- Authorised by: Constitution of the United States, Art. III, § 1
- Judge term length: life tenure, subject to impeachment and removal
- Number of positions: 9 (by statute)
- Website: supremecourt.gov

This is a list of cases reported in volume 296 of United States Reports, decided by the Supreme Court of the United States in 1935 and 1936.

== Justices of the Supreme Court at the time of volume 296 U.S. ==
The Supreme Court is established by Article III, Section 1 of the Constitution of the United States, which says: "The judicial Power of the United States, shall be vested in one supreme Court . . .". The size of the Court is not specified; the Constitution leaves it to Congress to set the number of justices. Under the Judiciary Act of 1789 Congress originally fixed the number of justices at six (one chief justice and five associate justices). Since 1789 Congress has varied the size of the Court from six to seven, nine, ten, and back to nine justices (always including one chief justice).

When the cases in volume 296 were decided the Court comprised the following nine members:

Portrait	Justice	Office	Home State	Succeeded	Date confirmed by the Senate (Vote)	Tenure on Supreme Court
	Charles Evans Hughes	Chief Justice	New York	William Howard Taft	February 13, 1930 (52–26)	February 24, 1930 – June 30, 1941 (Retired)
	Willis Van Devanter	Associate Justice	Wyoming	Edward Douglass White (as Associate Justice)	December 15, 1910 (Acclamation)	January 3, 1911 – June 2, 1937 (Retired)
	James Clark McReynolds	Associate Justice	Tennessee	Horace Harmon Lurton	August 29, 1914 (44–6)	October 12, 1914 – January 31, 1941 (Retired)
	Louis Brandeis	Associate Justice	Massachusetts	Joseph Rucker Lamar	June 1, 1916 (47–22)	June 5, 1916 – February 13, 1939 (Retired)
	George Sutherland	Associate Justice	Utah	John Hessin Clarke	September 5, 1922 (Acclamation)	October 2, 1922 – January 17, 1938 (Retired)
	Pierce Butler	Associate Justice	Minnesota	William R. Day	December 21, 1922 (61–8)	January 2, 1923 – November 16, 1939 (Died)
	Harlan F. Stone	Associate Justice	New York	Joseph McKenna	February 5, 1925 (71–6)	March 2, 1925 – July 2, 1941 (Continued as chief justice)
	Owen Roberts	Associate Justice	Pennsylvania	Edward Terry Sanford	May 20, 1930 (Acclamation)	June 2, 1930 – July 31, 1945 (Resigned)
	Benjamin N. Cardozo	Associate Justice	New York	Oliver Wendell Holmes Jr.	February 24, 1932 (Acclamation)	March 14, 1932 – July 9, 1938 (Died)

== Notable Cases in 296 U.S. ==
=== Pacific States Box and Basket Company v. White ===
Pacific States Box and Basket Company v. White, 296 U.S. 176 (1935), arose after The Oregon Division of Plant Industries, having been granted the power to prevent fraud or deception and to promote, protect, further or develop the horticultural interests of the state, prescribed the type, size and shape of containers for the sale of strawberries and raspberries. A California manufacturer of fruit and vegetable containers challenged the rule as arbitrary and capricious in violation of the Due Process Clause of the Fourteenth Amendment to the United States Constitution. On appeal, the Supreme Court held that "where the regulation is within the scope of authority legally delegated, the presumption of the existence of facts justifying its specific exercise attaches alike to statutes, to municipal ordinances, and to orders of administrative bodies." The case served as a precursor to Administrative Procedure Act rationality review.

=== Fox Film Corporation v. Muller ===
In Fox Film Corporation v. Muller, 296 U.S. 207 (1935), the Supreme Court held that it cannot exercise certiorari jurisdiction over a case in which there is an adequate and independent state law ground for the state court's final judgment.

=== United States v. Constantine ===
United States v. Constantine, 296 U.S. 287 (1935), concerned liquor laws and taxation. Congress placed a tax on liquor dealers who violated state liquor laws. The Supreme Court struck down the relevant portion of the Revenue Act of 1926 as an attempt to punish a state violation through taxation. The Court ruled that the primary purpose of the tax law was to enforce federal police powers, and not to raise revenue. After repeal of the Eighteenth Amendment, the federal law was no longer enforceable. The Supreme Court's opinion in National Federation of Independent Business v. Sebelius (2012) referenced the logic of Constantine in determining whether the Affordable Care Act was a penalty or a tax in terms of the Constitution; the Court held it was a tax, after "[d]isregarding the designation of the exaction, and viewing its substance and application".

== Federal court system ==
Under the Judiciary Act of 1789 the federal court structure at the time comprised District Courts, which had general trial jurisdiction; Circuit Courts, which had mixed trial and appellate (from the US District Courts) jurisdiction; and the United States Supreme Court, which had appellate jurisdiction over the federal District and Circuit courts—and for certain issues over state courts. The Supreme Court also had limited original jurisdiction (i.e., in which cases could be filed directly with the Supreme Court without first having been heard by a lower federal or state court). There were one or more federal District Courts and/or Circuit Courts in each state, territory, or other geographical region.

The Judiciary Act of 1891 created the United States Courts of Appeals and reassigned the jurisdiction of most routine appeals from the district and circuit courts to these appellate courts. The Act created nine new courts that were originally known as the "United States Circuit Courts of Appeals." The new courts had jurisdiction over most appeals of lower court decisions. The Supreme Court could review either legal issues that a court of appeals certified or decisions of court of appeals by writ of certiorari. On January 1, 1912, the effective date of the Judicial Code of 1911, the old Circuit Courts were abolished, with their remaining trial court jurisdiction transferred to the U.S. District Courts.

== List of cases in volume 296 U.S. ==
Case name	Citation	Opinion of the Court	Vote	Concurring opinion or statement	Dissenting opinion or statement	Procedural jurisdiction	Result
Douglas v. Willcuts, Collector of Internal Revenue	296 U.S. 1 (1935)	Hughes	9–0	none	none	certiorari to the United States Court of Appeals for the Eighth Circuit (8th Cir.)	decree affirmed
Borax Consolidated, Ltd. v. City of Los Angeles	296 U.S. 10 (1935)	Hughes	8–1	none	McReynolds (short statement)	certiorari to the United States Court of Appeals for the Ninth Circuit (9th Cir.)	decree affirmed
Graham v. White-Phillips Company	296 U.S. 27 (1935)	McReynolds	9–0	none	none	certiorari to the United States Court of Appeals for the Seventh Circuit (7th Cir.)	judgment affirmed
Atlanta, Birmingham and Coast Railroad Company v. United States	296 U.S. 33 (1935)	Brandeis	9–0	none	none	appeal from the United States District Court for the Northern District of Georgia (N.D. Ga.)	judgment affirmed
Helvering, Commissioner of Internal Revenue v. St. Louis Union Trust Company	296 U.S. 39 (1935)	Sutherland	5–4	none	Stone (opinion; joined by Hughes, Brandeis, and Cardozo)	certiorari to the United States Court of Appeals for the Eighth Circuit (8th Cir.)	judgment affirmed
Becker, Collector of Internal Revenue v. St. Louis Union Trust Company	296 U.S. 48 (1935)	Sutherland	5–4	none	Stone, Hughes, Brandeis, and Cardozo dissented for the reasons stated in their dissent in Helvering v. St. Louis Union Trust Company, 296 U.S. 39 (1935)	certiorari to the United States Court of Appeals for the Eighth Circuit (8th Cir.)	judgment affirmed
Chandler and Price Company v. Brandtjen and Kluge, Inc.	296 U.S. 53 (1935)	Butler	9–0	none	none	certiorari to the United States Court of Appeals for the Second Circuit (2d Cir.)	judgment affirmed
Raybestos-Manhattan, Inc. v. United States	296 U.S. 60 (1935)	Stone	9–0	none	none	certiorari to the United States Court of Claims (Ct. Cl.)	judgment affirmed
Di Giovanni v. Camden Fire Insurance Association	296 U.S. 64 (1935)	Stone	9–0	none	none	certiorari to the United States Court of Appeals for the Eighth Circuit (8th Cir.)	judgment reversed
Becker Steel Company of America v. Cummings, Attorney General of the United States (in his Capacity as Alien Property Custodian)	296 U.S. 74 (1935)	Stone	7–2	none	Roberts (opinion; with which Sutherland concurred)	certiorari to the United States Court of Appeals for the Second Circuit (2d Cir.)	judgment reversed
Helvering, Commissioner of Internal Revenue v. City Bank Farmers Trust Company	296 U.S. 85 (1935)	Roberts	5–4	none	VanDevanter, McReynolds, Sutherland, and Butler (without opinions)	certiorari to the United States Court of Appeals for the Second Circuit (2d Cir.)	judgment reversed
Helvering, Commissioner of Internal Revenue v. Helmholz	296 U.S. 93 (1935)	Roberts	9–0	Brandeis, Stone, and Cardozo (short statement)	none	certiorari to the United States Court of Appeals for the District of Columbia (D.C. Cir.)	judgment affirmed
White v. Poor	296 U.S. 98 (1935)	Roberts	9–0	Brandeis, Stone, and Cardozo (without opinions)	none	certiorari to the United States Court of Appeals for the First Circuit (1st Cir.)	judgment affirmed
McFeely v. Commissioner of Internal Revenue	296 U.S. 102 (1935)	Roberts	6–3	none	Brandeis, Stone, and Cardozo (joint short statement)	certiorari to the United States Court of Appeals for the Third Circuit (3d Cir.)	judgment affirmed (two cases); judgment reversed (three cases)
Schuylkill Trust Company v. Pennsylvania	296 U.S. 113 (1935)	Roberts	6–3	none	Cardozo (opinion; joined by Brandeis and Stone)	appeal from the Pennsylvania Supreme Court (Pa.)	judgment reversed, and cause remanded
American Surety Company v. Westinghouse Electric Manufacturing Company	296 U.S. 133 (1935)	Cardozo	8–1	none	Roberts (opinion)	certiorari to the United States Court of Appeals for the Fifth Circuit (5th Cir.)	decree affirmed
McCandless v. Furlaud	296 U.S. 140 (1935)	Cardozo	5–4	none	Roberts (opinion; with which McReynolds, Sutherland, and Butler concurred)	certiorari to the United States Court of Appeals for the Second Circuit (2d Cir.)	decree reversed
Pacific States Box and Basket Company v. White	296 U.S. 176 (1935)	Brandeis	9–0	none	none	appeal from the United States District Court for the District of Oregon (D. Or.)	judgment affirmed
Chesapeake and Ohio Railway Company v. United States	296 U.S. 187 (1935)	per curiam	9–0	none	none	appeal from the United States District Court for the Southern District of West Virginia (S.D.W. Va.)	judgment affirmed
United States v. Hastings	296 U.S. 188 (1935)	Hughes	9–0	none	none	appeal from the United States District Court for the Northern District of Mississippi (N.D. Miss.)	judgment affirmed
General Utility and Operating Company v. Helvering, Commissioner of Internal Revenue	296 U.S. 200 (1935)	McReynolds	9–0	none	none	certiorari to the United States Court of Appeals for the Fourth Circuit (4th Cir.)	judgment reversed
Fox Film Corporation v. Muller	296 U.S. 207 (1935)	Sutherland	8-0[a]	none	none	certiorari to the Minnesota Supreme Court (Minn.)	writ of certiorari dismissed for want of jurisdiction
Bingham v. United States	296 U.S. 211 (1935)	Sutherland	9–0	Brandeis, Stone, and Cardozo (joint short statement); Hughes (short statement)	none	certiorari to the United States Court of Appeals for the First Circuit (1st Cir.)	judgment reversed
Industrial Trust Company v. United States	296 U.S. 220 (1935)	Sutherland	9–0	none	none	certiorari to the United States Court of Claims (Ct. Cl.)	judgment reversed
Alexander v. Hillman	296 U.S. 222 (1935)	Butler	9–0	none	none	certiorari to the United States Court of Appeals for the Fourth Circuit (4th Cir.)	judgment reversed
Klamath and Moadoc Tribes of Indians v. United States	296 U.S. 244 (1935)	Butler	8-0[b]	none	none	certiorari to the United States Court of Claims (Ct. Cl.)	judgment affirmed
Miller v. Irving Trust Company	296 U.S. 256 (1935)	Butler	9–0	none	none	certiorari to the United States Court of Appeals for the Second Circuit (2d Cir.)	judgment affirmed
Clyde Mallory Lines v. Alabama ex rel. State Docks Commission	296 U.S. 261 (1935)	Stone	9–0	none	none	appeal from the Alabama Supreme Court (Ala.)	judgment affirmed
Milwaukee County v. M.E. White Company	296 U.S. 268 (1935)	Stone	7–2	none	McReynolds and Butler (without opinions)	certified question from the United States Court of Appeals for the Seventh Circuit (7th Cir.)	certified question answered
Del Vecchio v. Bowers	296 U.S. 280 (1935)	Roberts	9–0	none	none	certiorari to the United States Court of Appeals for the District of Columbia (D.C. Cir.)	judgment reversed, and cause remanded
United States v. Constantine	296 U.S. 287 (1935)	Roberts	6–3	none	Cardozo (opinion; joined by Brandeis and Stone)	certiorari to the United States Court of Appeals for the Fifth Circuit (5th Cir.)	judgment affirmed
United States v. Kesterson	296 U.S. 299 (1935)	Roberts	6–3	none	Brandeis, Stone, and Cardozo (for the reasons stated in the dissent in United States v. Constantine)	certiorari to the United States Court of Appeals for the Tenth Circuit (10th Cir.)	judgment affirmed
Hulburd v. Commissioner of Internal Revenue	296 U.S. 300 (1935)	Cardozo	9–0	none	none	certiorari to the United States Court of Appeals for the Seventh Circuit (7th Cir.)	decree reversed
Hopkins Federal Savings and Loan Association v. Cleary	296 U.S. 315 (1935)	Cardozo	9–0	none	none	certiorari to the Wisconsin Supreme Court (Wis.)	judgments affirmed
Morrissey v. Commissioner of Internal Revenue	296 U.S. 344 (1935)	Hughes	9–0	none	none	certiorari to the United States Court of Appeals for the Ninth Circuit (9th Cir.)	judgment affirmed
Swanson v. Commissioner of Internal Revenue	296 U.S. 362 (1935)	Hughes	9–0	none	none	certiorari to the United States Court of Appeals for the Seventh Circuit (7th Cir.)	judgment affirmed
Helvering, Commissioner of Internal Revenue v. Combs	296 U.S. 365 (1935)	Hughes	9–0	none	none	certiorari to the United States Court of Appeals for the Ninth Circuit (9th Cir.)	judgment reversed
Helvering, Commissioner of Internal Revenue v. Coleman-Gilbert Associates	296 U.S. 369 (1935)	Hughes	9–0	none	none	certiorari to the United States Court of Appeals for the First Circuit (1st Cir.)	decrees reversed
John A. Nelson Company v. Helvering, Commissioner of Internal Revenue	296 U.S. 374 (1935)	McReynolds	9–0	none	none	certiorari to the United States Court of Appeals for the Seventh Circuit (7th Cir.)	judgment reversed
Helvering, Commissioner of Internal Revenue v. Minnesota Tea Company	296 U.S. 378 (1935)	McReynolds	9–0	none	none	certiorari to the United States Court of Appeals for the Eighth Circuit (8th Cir.)	judgments affirmed
Helvering, Commissioner of Internal Revenue v. Watts	296 U.S. 387 (1935)	McReynolds	9–0	none	none	certiorari to the United States Court of Appeals for the Second Circuit (2d Cir.)	judgments affirmed
G. and K. Manufacturing Company v. Helvering, Commissioner of Internal Revenue	296 U.S. 389 (1935)	McReynolds	9–0	none	none	certiorari to the United States Court of Appeals for the Fourth Circuit (4th Cir.)	judgment reversed
Bus and Transportation Security Corporation v. Helvering, Commissioner of Internal Revenue	296 U.S. 391 (1935)	McReynolds	9–0	none	none	certiorari to the United States Court of Appeals for the Third Circuit (3d Cir.)	judgments affirmed
Hill v. Martin	296 U.S. 393 (1935)	Brandeis	8-0[c]	none	none	appeal from the United States District Court for the District of New Jersey (D.N.J.)	judgment affirmed
Colgate v. Harvey	296 U.S. 404 (1935)	Sutherland	6–3	none	Stone (opinion; with which Brandeis and Cardozo concurred)	appeal from the Vermont Supreme Court (Vt.)	judgment reversed, and cause remanded
United States v. Halsey, Stuart and Company	296 U.S. 451 (1935)	per curiam	9–0	none	none	appeal from the United States District Court for the Eastern District of Wisconsin (E.D. Wis.)	appeal dismissed
Corporation Commission of Oklahoma v. Cary	296 U.S. 452 (1935)	per curiam	9–0	none	none	appeal from the United States District Court for the Western District of Oklahoma (W.D. Okla.)	judgment affirmed
Radio Corporation of America v. Raytheon Manufacturing Company	296 U.S. 459 (1935)	Cardozo	9–0	none	none	certiorari to the United States Court of Appeals for the First Circuit (1st Cir.)	decree affirmed
United States v. Bank of New York and Trust Company	296 U.S. 463 (1935)	Hughes	9–0	none	none	certiorari to the United States Court of Appeals for the Second Circuit (2d Cir.)	decrees affirmed
United States Trust Company of New York v. Commissioner of Internal Revenue	296 U.S. 481 (1935)	Hughes	9–0	none	none	certiorari to the United States Court of Appeals for the Second Circuit (2d Cir.)	decision reversed
Helvering, Commissioner of Internal Revenue v. McIlvaine	296 U.S. 488 (1935)	Hughes	9–0	none	none	certiorari to the United States Court of Appeals for the Seventh Circuit (7th Cir.)	decrees affirmed
Legg v. St. John	296 U.S. 489 (1935)	Brandeis	9–0	none	none	certiorari to the United States Court of Appeals for the Sixth Circuit (6th Cir.)	judgment affirmed
Posadas v. National City Bank	296 U.S. 497 (1935)	Sutherland	9–0	none	none	certiorari to the Supreme Court of the Philippines (Phil.)	judgment affirmed
Public Service Commission of Puerto Rico v. Havemeyer	296 U.S. 506 (1936)	Butler	9–0	none	none	certiorari to the United States Court of Appeals for the First Circuit (1st Cir.)	judgment reversed
Oklahoma ex rel. Oklahoma Tax Commission v. Barnsdall Refineries, Inc.	296 U.S. 521 (1936)	Stone	9–0	none	none	certiorari to the Oklahoma Supreme Court (Okla.)	judgment affirmed
Chapman v. Hoage	296 U.S. 526 (1936)	Stone	9–0	none	none	certiorari to the United States Court of Appeals for the District of Columbia (D.C. Cir.)	judgment reversed

[a] Hughes took no part in the case
[b] McReynolds took no part in the case
[c] Stone took no part in the case
