= Michigan v. Long =

- Supreme Court of the United States

Argued February 23, 1983 Decided July 6, 1983
- Full case name: Michigan v. David Kerk Long
- Citations: 463 U.S. 1032 (more) 103 S. Ct. 3469; 77 L. Ed. 2d 1201; 51 U.S.L.W. 5231

Case history
- Prior: Conviction upheld, 94 Mich. App. 338, 288 N.W.2d 629. Reversed, 413 Mich., at 472, 320 N.W.2d, at 869. Certiorari to the Supreme Court of Michigan, 459 U.S. 904.
- Subsequent: 413 Mich. 461, 320 N.W.2d 866, reversed and remanded.

Holding
- The protective search of the passenger compartment of respondent's car was reasonable under the principles articulated in Terry and other decisions.

Court membership
- Chief Justice Warren E. Burger Associate Justices William J. Brennan Jr. · Byron White; Thurgood Marshall · Harry Blackmun; Lewis F. Powell Jr. · William Rehnquist; John P. Stevens · Sandra Day O'Connor

Case opinions
- Majority: O'Connor, joined by Burger, White, Powell, Rehnquist; Blackmun (Parts I, III, IV, V only)
- Concur/dissent: Blackmun
- Dissent: Brennan, joined by Marshall
- Dissent: Stevens

Laws applied
- U.S. Const. amend. IV

Michigan v. Long, 463 U.S. 1032 (1983), was a decision by the United States Supreme Court that extended Terry v. Ohio, 392 U.S. 1 (1968) to allow searches of car compartments during a stop with reasonable suspicion. The case also clarified and narrowed the extent of adequate and independent state ground, allowing U.S. Supreme Court review of state supreme court decisions unless they explicitly appealed to state laws.

== Background ==
David Long was questioned by police after driving his car off a road and into a shallow ditch in Barry County, Michigan. Officers said he acted erratically and that he, "appeared to be under the influence of something." Noticing a hunting knife on the floor of the car, they conducted a "Terry" protective patdown (named after Terry v. Ohio), but they turned up no weapons. They then conducted a "protective search" of the car with the same justification: searching for weapons. Inside the car, police found an exposed bag of marijuana. In the trunk they found approximately 75 pounds (34 kg) more, and Long was arrested for drug possession.

=== Procedural history ===
Long argued during his trial that the evidence found in his car should be suppressed because the search was unconstitutional. The same argument was advanced during his appeal to the Michigan Court of Appeals. In each case, the court ruled against suppressing the evidence.

However, the Michigan Supreme Court reversed these rulings. Relying largely on federal precedent, especially Terry v. Ohio, the Supreme Court ruled that the "protective search" violated the Fourth Amendment, and thus the "poisonous fruit" of the illegal search must be discarded.

Additionally, the Michigan Supreme Court grounded its decision on article 1, section 11 of the Michigan Constitution. It argued that the search violated both federal and state constitutions, suggesting that if the federal ruling was overturned the presumably more rigorous ruling from the Michigan Constitution would survive. Precedent from Murdock v. City of Memphis, 87 U.S. 590 (1874) and other cases established that the U.S. Supreme Court could not review state cases if there was adequate and independent state ground. That is, state supreme courts are the last word on interpreting state constitutions and laws. The Supreme Court, however, found that the lower court's opinion did not indicate that its decision rested on grounds in any way independent from its interpretation of federal law. Apart from two citations to the Michigan Constitution, the state court relied exclusively on its understanding of federal law.

== Decision ==
The Supreme Court not only ruled that Michigan misapplied Terry v. Ohio and the Fourth Amendment but also ruled that Long had insufficient adequate and independent state ground. O'Connor, a former judge on the Arizona Court of Appeals, affirmed the doctrine of independent state ground, but wrote that the Michigan Supreme Court adjudicated almost exclusively from federal law. Thus, the Court "accept[ed] as the most reasonable explanation that the state court decided the case the way it did because it believed that Federal law required it so." Essentially, the Supreme Court presumed the state decision rested on federal grounds. O'Connor suggests that state courts write "clearly and expressly" that their decision rests on bona fide state grounds. Should they do this, the U.S. Supreme Court would "not undertake to review the decision."

One solution is that state courts may rule their own constitution "in parallel" with the U.S. Constitution. That is, they take Federal case law, especially if it is to their liking, as "advisory," but they make clear that federal law is not considered by the court precedent. In this way, state courts can protect individual rights at a very high level as the late Justice Brennan suggested.

Although this opinion helped clarify what had theretofore been ambiguous, some critics charged that Michigan v. Long was politically motivated. Justice Stevens, for example, enumerated the ways the US Supreme Court had previously handled such ambiguities. Predominantly, the Court sent cases back down for clarification, but in Long they ruled directly against it without awaiting clarification. Presumably, the more conservative Burger court sought to reverse the liberal Michigan decision.

== See also ==
- List of United States Supreme Court cases, volume 463
- Terry v. Ohio (1968)
