= List of United States Supreme Court cases, volume 87 =

Supreme Court of the United States
- Interactive map of Supreme Court of the United States
- 38°53′26″N 77°00′16″W
- Established: March 4, 1789; 236 years ago
- Location: Washington, D.C.
- Coordinates: 38°53′26″N 77°00′16″W
- Composition method: Presidential nomination with Senate confirmation
- Authorised by: Constitution of the United States, Art. III, § 1
- Judge term length: life tenure, subject to impeachment and removal
- Number of positions: 9 (by statute)
- Website: supremecourt.gov

This is a list of cases reported in volume 87 (20 Wall.) of United States Reports, decided by the Supreme Court of the United States in 1874 and 1875.

== Nominative reports ==
In 1874, the U.S. government created the United States Reports, and retroactively numbered older privately published case reports as part of the new series. As a result, cases appearing in volumes 1–90 of U.S. Reports have dual citation forms; one for the volume number of U.S. Reports, and one for the volume number of the reports named for the relevant reporter of decisions (these are called "nominative reports").

=== John William Wallace ===
Starting with the 66th volume of U.S. Reports, the Reporter of Decisions of the Supreme Court of the United States was John William Wallace. Wallace was Reporter of Decisions from 1863 to 1874, covering volumes 68 through 90 of United States Reports which correspond to volumes 1 through 23 of his Wallace's Reports. As such, the dual form of citation to, for example, Rubber-Tip Pencil Co. v. Howard is 87 U.S. (20 Wall.) 498 (1874).

Wallace's Reports were the final nominative reports for the US Supreme Court; starting with volume 91, cases were identified simply as "(volume #) U.S. (page #) (year)".

== Justices of the Supreme Court at the time of 87 U.S. (20 Wall.) ==
The Supreme Court is established by Article III, Section 1 of the Constitution of the United States, which says: "The judicial Power of the United States, shall be vested in one supreme Court . . .". The size of the Court is not specified; the Constitution leaves it to Congress to set the number of justices. Under the Judiciary Act of 1789 Congress originally fixed the number of justices at six (one chief justice and five associate justices). Since 1789 Congress has varied the size of the Court from six to seven, nine, ten, and back to nine justices (always including one chief justice).

When the cases in 87 U.S. (20 Wall.) were decided the Court comprised the following nine members:

Portrait	Justice	Office	Home State	Succeeded	Date confirmed by the Senate (Vote)	Tenure on Supreme Court
	Morrison Waite	Chief Justice	Ohio	Salmon P. Chase	January 21, 1874 (63–0)	March 4, 1874 – March 23, 1888 (Died)
	Nathan Clifford	Associate Justice	Maine	Benjamin Robbins Curtis	January 12, 1858 (26–23)	January 21, 1858 – July 25, 1881 (Died)
	Noah Haynes Swayne	Associate Justice	Ohio	John McLean	January 24, 1862 (38–1)	January 27, 1862 – January 24, 1881 (Retired)
	Samuel Freeman Miller	Associate Justice	Iowa	Peter Vivian Daniel	July 16, 1862 (Acclamation)	July 21, 1862 – October 13, 1890 (Died)
	David Davis	Associate Justice	Illinois	John Archibald Campbell	December 8, 1862 (Acclamation)	December 10, 1862 – March 4, 1877 (Resigned)
	Stephen Johnson Field	Associate Justice	California	newly created seat	March 10, 1863 (Acclamation)	May 10, 1863 – December 1, 1897 (Retired)
	William Strong	Associate Justice	Pennsylvania	Robert Cooper Grier	February 18, 1870 (No vote recorded)	March 14, 1870 – December 14, 1880 (Retired)
	Joseph P. Bradley	Associate Justice	New Jersey	newly created seat	March 21, 1870 (46–9)	March 23, 1870 – January 22, 1892 (Died)
	Ward Hunt	Associate Justice	New York	Samuel Nelson	December 11, 1872 (Acclamation)	January 9, 1873 – January 27, 1882 (Retired)

== Notable Case in 87 U.S. (20 Wall.) ==
=== Murdock v. City of Memphis ===
The Supreme Court in Murdock v. City of Memphis, 87 U.S. (20 Wall.) 590 (1875), established the principle that interpretation of state law is the province of state courts, and that the state supreme courts, rather than the federal courts, have final jurisdiction in this area.

== Citation style ==
Under the Judiciary Act of 1789 the federal court structure at the time comprised District Courts, which had general trial jurisdiction; Circuit Courts, which had mixed trial and appellate (from the US District Courts) jurisdiction; and the United States Supreme Court, which had appellate jurisdiction over the federal District and Circuit courts—and for certain issues over state courts. The Supreme Court also had limited original jurisdiction (i.e., in which cases could be filed directly with the Supreme Court without first having been heard by a lower federal or state court). There were one or more federal District Courts and/or Circuit Courts in each state, territory, or other geographical region.

Bluebook citation style is used for case names, citations, and jurisdictions.

- "C.C.D." = United States Circuit Court for the District of . . .
  - e.g.,"C.C.D.N.J." = United States Circuit Court for the District of New Jersey
- "D." = United States District Court for the District of . . .
  - e.g.,"D. Mass." = United States District Court for the District of Massachusetts
- "E." = Eastern; "M." = Middle; "N." = Northern; "S." = Southern; "W." = Western
  - e.g.,"C.C.S.D.N.Y." = United States Circuit Court for the Southern District of New York
  - e.g.,"M.D. Ala." = United States District Court for the Middle District of Alabama
- "Ct. Cl." = United States Court of Claims
- The abbreviation of a state's name alone indicates the highest appellate court in that state's judiciary at the time.
  - e.g.,"Pa." = Supreme Court of Pennsylvania
  - e.g.,"Me." = Supreme Judicial Court of Maine

== List of cases in 87 U.S. (20 Wall.) ==
Case Name	Page and year	Opinion of the Court	Concurring opinion(s)	Dissenting opinion(s)	Lower Court	Disposition
Habich v. Folger	1 (1874)	Hunt	none	none	Mass.	affirmed
Creighton v. Kerr	8 (1874)	Hunt	none	none	Sup. Ct. Terr. Colo.	affirmed
McQuiddy v. Ware	14 (1874)	Davis	none	none	C.C.E.D. Mo.	affirmed
Humaston v. American Telegraph Company	20 (1874)	Davis	none	none	C.C.S.D.N.Y.	affirmed
Kehr v. Smith	31 (1874)	Davis	none	none	C.C.E.D. Mo.	affirmed
Pacific Railroad Company v. Maguire	36 (1874)	Hunt	Waite	Clifford	Mo.	reversed
North Missouri Railroad Company v. Maguire	46 (1874)	Clifford	none	none	Mo.	affirmed
Oregon Steam Navigation Company v. Winsor	64 (1874)	Bradley	none	none	Sup. Ct. Terr. Wash.	reversed
National Bank v. Texas	72 (1874)	Miller	Swayne	none	Sup. Ct. D.C.	reversed
Confiscation Cases	92 (1874)	Strong	none	Clifford; Field	C.C.D. La.	reversed
Claims of Marcuard	114 (1874)	Strong	none	none	C.C.D. La.	affirmed
Conrad's Lots	115 (1874)	Strong	none	none	C.C.D. La.	reversed
Knapp v. Bennington and Rutland Railroad Company	117 (1874)	Davis	none	none	C.C.D. Vt.	reversed
Burton v. Driggs	125 (1874)	Swayne	none	none	C.C.D. Vt.	affirmed
Tioga Railroad v. Blossburg and Corning Railroad	137 (1874)	Bradley	Hunt	Miller	C.C.N.D.N.Y.	affirmed
Simpson v. Greeley	152 (1874)	Clifford	none	none	Kan.	dismissed
Merchants' Mutual Insurance Company v. Baring Brothers and Company	159 (1874)	Clifford	none	none	C.C.D. La.	affirmed
Roach v. Summers	165 (1874)	Strong	none	none	C.C.S.D. Miss.	affirmed
Bank v. Cooper	171 (1874)	Strong	none	none	C.C.N.D.N.Y.	affirmed
Twenty Per Cent Cases	179 (1874)	Clifford	none	Swayne	Ct. Cl.	multiple
Pahlman v. Raster	189 (1874)	Strong	none	none	C.C.N.D. Ill.	affirmed
The Lottawanna	201 (1874)	Clifford	none	none	C.C.D. La.	reversed
Cornett v. Williams	226 (1874)	Swayne	none	none	C.C.W.D. Tex.	affirmed
United States v. Herron	251 (1874)	Clifford	none	none	C.C.D. La.	reversed
McPhaul v. Lapsley	264 (1874)	Swayne	none	none	C.C.W.D. Tex.	affirmed
City of Memphis v. Brown	289 (1874)	Hunt	Field; Bradley	none	C.C.W.D. Tenn.	reversed
Stockdale v. Atlantic Insurance Company	323 (1874)	Miller	none	Strong	C.C.D. La.	reversed
Washing Machine Company v. Providence Tool Company	342 (1874)	Strong	none	none	C.C.D.R.I.	affirmed
Hailes v. Van Wormer	353 (1874)	Strong	none	none	C.C.N.D.N.Y.	affirmed
Ferris v. Higley	375 (1874)	Miller	none	none	Sup. Ct. Terr. Utah	affirmed
The Steamboat Wheeler	385 (1874)	Waite	none	none	C.C.D. Mass.	affirmed
City of New Orleans v. Steamship Company	387 (1874)	Swayne	Hunt	Field	C.C.D. La.	affirmed
Lyon v. Pollard	403 (1874)	Miller	none	none	Sup. Ct. D.C.	reversed
Avery v. Hackley	407 (1874)	Davis	none	none	C.C.W.D. Mich.	affirmed
Mays v. Fritton	414 (1874)	Hunt	none	none	Pa.	affirmed
The Belle of the Sea	421 (1874)	Strong	none	none	C.C.E.D. Pa.	affirmed
The Montello	430 (1874)	Davis	none	none	C.C.E.D. Wis.	reversed
Home Insurance Company v. Morse	445 (1874)	Hunt	none	Waite	Wis.	reversed
Sprott v. United States	459 (1874)	Miller	Clifford; Davis	Field	Ct. Cl.	affirmed
Titus v. United States	475 (1874)	Waite	none	none	C.C.S.D. Ga.	affirmed
Boley v. Griswold	486 (1874)	Waite	none	none	Sup. Ct. Terr. Mont.	affirmed
Hearne v. Marine Insurance Company	488 (1874)	Swayne	none	none	C.C.D. Mass.	affirmed
Equitable Insurance Company v. Hearne	494 (1874)	Swayne	none	none	C.C.M.D. Mass.	affirmed
Rubber-Tip Pencil Company v. Howard	498 (1874)	Waite	none	none	C.C.S.D.N.Y.	affirmed
Atchison v. Peterson	507 (1874)	Field	none	none	Sup. Ct. Terr. Mont.	affirmed
United States v. Gill	517 (1875)	Waite	none	none	Ct. Cl.	reversed
Pollard v. Bailey	520 (1874)	Waite	none	none	M.D. Ala.	reversed
Union Packet Company v. Clough	528 (1874)	Strong	none	none	C.C.E.D. Wis.	reversed
United States Express Company v. Ware	543 (1875)	Waite	none	none	C.C.D. Neb.	affirmed
Ambler v. Whipple	546 (1874)	Miller	none	none	Sup. Ct. D.C.	reversed
Franklin Insurance Company v. Colt	560 (1875)	Field	none	none	C.C.D. Conn.	affirmed
Gillette v. Bullard	571 (1874)	Waite	none	none	Sup. Ct. Terr. Mont.	affirmed
Longstreth v. Pennock	575 (1875)	Swayne	none	none	C.C.D. Pa.	affirmed
Cannon v. City of New Orleans	577 (1874)	Miller	none	none	La.	reversed
Clark v. City of Iowa City	583 (1875)	Field	none	Clifford	C.C.D. Iowa	affirmed
Murdock v. Memphis	590 (1875)	Miller	none	Clifford; Bradley	Tenn.	affirmed
Baltimore and Ohio Railroad Company v. Maryland	643 (1875)	Miller	none	none	Md.	dismissal denied
Mathews v. McStea	646 (1875)	Miller	none	none	N.Y. Ct. Com. Pl.	dismissal denied
Cadle v. Baker	650 (1875)	Waite	none	none	M.D. Ala.	reversed
Treat v. Jemison	652 (1875)	Waite	none	none	C.C.D. Cal.	affirmed
Parcels v. Johnson	653 (1874)	Waite	none	none	Mo.	dismissed
Citizens' Savings and Loan Association v. City of Topeka	655 (1875)	Miller	none	Clifford	C.C.D. Kan.	affirmed
Basey v. Gallagher	670 (1875)	Field	none	none	Sup. Ct. Terr. Mont.	affirmed
