= Pacific States Box & Basket Co. v. White =

- Supreme Court of the United States

Argued October 25, 1935 Decided November 18, 1935
- Full case name: Pacific States Box & Basket Co. v. White
- Citations: 296 U.S. 176 (more) 56 S. Ct. 159; 80 L. Ed. 138; 1935 U.S. LEXIS 569; 101 A.L.R. 853

Holding
- "Where the regulation is within the scope of authority legally delegated, the presumption of the existence of facts justifying its specific exercise attaches alike to statutes, to municipal ordinances, and to orders of administrative bodies."

Court membership
- Chief Justice Charles E. Hughes Associate Justices Willis Van Devanter · James C. McReynolds; Louis Brandeis · George Sutherland; Pierce Butler · Harlan F. Stone; Owen Roberts · Benjamin N. Cardozo

Case opinion
- Majority: Brandeis, joined by unanimous

Laws applied
- U.S. Const. amend. XIV

Pacific States Box & Basket Co. v. White, 296 U.S. 176 (1935), was a case heard by the United States Supreme Court.

== Background ==
The Oregon Division of Plant Industries, having been granted the power to prevent fraud or deception and to promote, protect, further or develop the horticultural interests of the state, prescribed the type, size and shape of containers for the sale of strawberries and raspberries.

A California manufacturer of fruit and vegetable containers challenged the rule as arbitrary and capricious in violation of the Due Process Clause of the Fourteenth Amendment to the United States Constitution.

== Opinion of the Court ==
In an opinion delivered by Associate Justice Louis Brandeis, the Court ruled that "where the regulation is within the scope of authority legally delegated, the presumption of the existence of facts justifying its specific exercise attaches alike to statutes, to municipal ordinances, and to orders of administrative bodies."

The regulation had been promulgated through notice and public hearing.

The court explained that when such a regulation was challenged, "if any state of facts reasonably can be conceived that would sustain it, there is a presumption of the existence of that state of facts, and one who assails the classification must carry the burden of showing by a resort to common knowledge or other matters which may be judicially noticed, or to other legitimate proof, that the action is arbitrary."

The case served as a precursor to Administrative Procedure Act rationality review.
