= List of United States Supreme Court cases, volume 308 =

Supreme Court of the United States
- Interactive map of Supreme Court of the United States
- 38°53′26″N 77°00′16″W
- Established: March 4, 1789; 236 years ago
- Location: Washington, D.C.
- Coordinates: 38°53′26″N 77°00′16″W
- Composition method: Presidential nomination with Senate confirmation
- Authorised by: Constitution of the United States, Art. III, § 1
- Judge term length: life tenure, subject to impeachment and removal
- Number of positions: 9 (by statute)
- Website: supremecourt.gov

This is a list of cases reported in volume 308 of United States Reports, decided by the Supreme Court of the United States in 1939 and 1940.

== Justices of the Supreme Court at the time of volume 308 U.S. ==
The Supreme Court is established by Article III, Section 1 of the Constitution of the United States, which says: "The judicial Power of the United States, shall be vested in one supreme Court . . .". The size of the Court is not specified; the Constitution leaves it to Congress to set the number of justices. Under the Judiciary Act of 1789 Congress originally fixed the number of justices at six (one chief justice and five associate justices). Since 1789 Congress has varied the size of the Court from six to seven, nine, ten, and back to nine justices (always including one chief justice).

When the cases in volume 308 were decided the Court comprised the following members (Justice Butler died in the midst of the time-period covered by volume 308):

Portrait	Justice	Office	Home State	Succeeded	Date confirmed by the Senate (Vote)	Tenure on Supreme Court
	Charles Evans Hughes	Chief Justice	New York	William Howard Taft	February 13, 1930 (52–26)	February 24, 1930 – June 30, 1941 (Retired)
	James Clark McReynolds	Associate Justice	Tennessee	Horace Harmon Lurton	August 29, 1914 (44–6)	October 12, 1914 – January 31, 1941 (Retired)
	Pierce Butler	Associate Justice	Minnesota	William R. Day	December 21, 1922 (61–8)	January 2, 1923 – November 16, 1939 (Died)
	Harlan F. Stone	Associate Justice	New York	Joseph McKenna	February 5, 1925 (71–6)	March 2, 1925 – July 2, 1941 (Continued as chief justice)
	Owen Roberts	Associate Justice	Pennsylvania	Edward Terry Sanford	May 20, 1930 (Acclamation)	June 2, 1930 – July 31, 1945 (Resigned)
	Hugo Black	Associate Justice	Alabama	Willis Van Devanter	August 17, 1937 (63–16)	August 19, 1937 – September 17, 1971 (Retired)
	Stanley Forman Reed	Associate Justice	Kentucky	George Sutherland	January 25, 1938 (Acclamation)	January 31, 1938 – February 25, 1957 (Retired)
	Felix Frankfurter	Associate Justice	Massachusetts	Benjamin Nathan Cardozo	January 17, 1939 (Acclamation)	January 30, 1939 – August 28, 1962 (Retired)
	William O. Douglas	Associate Justice	Connecticut	Louis Brandeis	April 4, 1939 (62–4)	April 17, 1939 – November 12, 1975 (Retired)

== Notable Case in 308 U.S. ==
=== Schneider v. State (Town of Irvington) ===
Schneider v. State (Town of Irvington), 308 U.S. 147 (1939), was a decision that combined four similar appeals (Schneider v. State (Town of Irvington), Young v. California, Snyder v. City of Milwaukee, and Nichols v. Massachusetts), each of which presented the question whether municipal ordinances abridged the First Amendment rights of freedom of speech and of the press secured against state invasion by the Fourteenth Amendment of the Constitution. The appellants (Jehovah's Witnesses) were charged with violating ordinances barring persons from distributing handbills on public streets or handing them out door-to-door. The Supreme Court held that the purpose of the ordinances (to keep the streets clean and of good appearance) was insufficient to justify prohibiting the appellants from handing out literature to other persons willing to receive it.

== Federal court system ==
Under the Judiciary Act of 1789 the federal court structure at the time comprised District Courts, which had general trial jurisdiction; Circuit Courts, which had mixed trial and appellate (from the US District Courts) jurisdiction; and the United States Supreme Court, which had appellate jurisdiction over the federal District and Circuit courts—and for certain issues over state courts. The Supreme Court also had limited original jurisdiction (i.e., in which cases could be filed directly with the Supreme Court without first having been heard by a lower federal or state court). There were one or more federal District Courts and/or Circuit Courts in each state, territory, or other geographical region.

The Judiciary Act of 1891 created the United States Courts of Appeals and reassigned the jurisdiction of most routine appeals from the district and circuit courts to these appellate courts. The Act created nine new courts that were originally known as the "United States Circuit Courts of Appeals." The new courts had jurisdiction over most appeals of lower court decisions. The Supreme Court could review either legal issues that a court of appeals certified or decisions of court of appeals by writ of certiorari. On January 1, 1912, the effective date of the Judicial Code of 1911, the old Circuit Courts were abolished, with their remaining trial court jurisdiction transferred to the U.S. District Courts.

== List of cases in volume 308 U.S. ==
Case name	Citation	Opinion of the Court	Vote	Concurring opinion or statement	Dissenting opinion or statement	Procedural jurisdiction	Result
Massachusetts v. Missouri	308 U.S. 1 (1939)	Hughes	8-0[a]	none	none	Original jurisdiction of the Supreme Court of the United States (original jurisdiction)	leave to file bill of complaint denied
Pittman, Clerk of the Superior Court of Baltimore v. Home Owners' Loan Corporation	308 U.S. 21 (1939)	Hughes	8-0[a]	none	none	certiorari to the Maryland Court of Appeals (Md.)	affirmed
Standard Brands, Inc. v. National Grain Yeast Corporation	308 U.S. 34 (1939)	McReynolds	7-0[a][b]	none	none	certiorari to the United States Court of Appeals for the Third Circuit (3d Cir.)	affirmed
Estate of Sanford v. Internal Revenue Service	308 U.S. 39 (1939)	Stone	8-0[a]	none	none	certiorari to the United States Court of Appeals for the Third Circuit (3d Cir.)	affirmed
Rasquin, Collector of Internal Revenue v. Humphreys	308 U.S. 54 (1939)	Stone	8-0[a]	none	none	certiorari to the United States Court of Appeals for the Second Circuit (2d Cir.)	affirmed
Boteler v. Ingels, Director of Motor Vehicles of California	308 U.S. 57 (1939)	Black	8-0[a]	none	none	certiorari to the United States Court of Appeals for the Ninth Circuit (9th Cir.)	affirmed
United States v. Glenn L. Martin Company	308 U.S. 62 (1939)	Black	8-0[a]	none	none	certiorari to the United States Court of Appeals for the Fourth Circuit (4th Cir.)	reversed
Treinies v. Sunshine Mining Company	308 U.S. 66 (1939)	Reed	8-0[a]	none	none	certiorari to the United States Court of Appeals for the Ninth Circuit (9th Cir.)	affirmed
Palmer v. Massachusetts	308 U.S. 79 (1939)	Frankfurter	8-0[a]	none	none	certiorari to the United States Court of Appeals for the Second Circuit (2d Cir.)	affirmed
Helvering, Commissioner of Internal Revenue v. Wilshire Oil Company	308 U.S. 90 (1939)	Douglas	7-0[a][c]	none	none	certiorari to the United States Court of Appeals for the Ninth Circuit (9th Cir.)	reversed
F.H.E. Oil Company v. Helvering, Commissioner of Internal Revenue	308 U.S. 104 (1939)	Douglas	7-0[a][c]	none	none	certiorari to the United States Court of Appeals for the Fifth Circuit (5th Cir.)	affirmed
Case v. Los Angeles Lumber Products Company	308 U.S. 106 (1939)	Douglas	8-0[a]	none	none	certiorari to the United States Court of Appeals for the Ninth Circuit (9th Cir.)	reversed
Ziffrin, Inc. v. Reeves	308 U.S. 132 (1939)	McReynolds	8-0[a]	none	none	appeal from the United States District Court for the Eastern District of Kentucky (E.D. Ky.)	affirmed
Valvoline Oil Company v. United States	308 U.S. 141 (1939)	Reed	8-0[a]	none	none	appeal from the United States District Court for the Western District of Pennsylvania (W.D. Pa.)	affirmed
Schneider v. State (Town of Irvington)	308 U.S. 147 (1939)	Roberts	7-1	none	McReynolds (without opinion)	certiorari to the New Jersey Court of Errors and Appeals (N.J.)	all reversed
Neirbo Company v. Bethlehem Shipbuilding Corporation	308 U.S. 165 (1939)	Frankfurter	5-3	none	Roberts (opinion; joined by Hughes and McReynolds)	certiorari to the United States Court of Appeals for the Second Circuit (2d Cir.)	reversed
John Hancock Mutual Life Insurance Company v. Bartels	308 U.S. 180 (1939)	Hughes	8-0	none	none	certiorari to the United States Court of Appeals for the Fifth Circuit (5th Cir.)	affirmed
United States v. Borden Company	308 U.S. 188 (1939)	Hughes	8-0	none	none	appeal from the United States District Court for the Northern District of Illinois (N.D. Ill.)	dismissed in part, and reversed in part
Cities Service Oil Company v. Dunlap	308 U.S. 208 (1939)	McReynolds	8-0	none	none	certiorari to the United States Court of Appeals for the Fifth Circuit (5th Cir.)	reversed
Union Stock Yard and Transit Company v. United States	308 U.S. 213 (1939)	Stone	8-0	none	none	appeal from the United States District Court for the Northern District of Illinois (N.D. Ill.)	affirmed
United States v. Lowden	308 U.S. 225 (1939)	Stone	8-0	none	none	appeal from the United States District Court for the Northern District of Illinois (N.D. Ill.)	reversed
National Labor Relations Board v. Newport News Shipbuilding and Dry Dock Company	308 U.S. 241 (1939)	Roberts	8-0	none	none	certiorari to the United States Court of Appeals for the Fourth Circuit (4th Cir.)	reversed
Helvering, Commissioner of Internal Revenue v. F. and R. Lazarus and Company	308 U.S. 252 (1939)	Black	7-0[c]	none	none	certiorari to the United States Court of Appeals for the Sixth Circuit (6th Cir.)	affirmed
United States v. Sponenbarger	308 U.S. 256 (1939)	Black	8-0	none	none	certiorari to the United States Court of Appeals for the Eighth Circuit (8th Cir.)	reversed
Danforth v. United States	308 U.S. 271 (1939)	Reed	8-0	none	none	certiorari to the United States Court of Appeals for the Eighth Circuit (8th Cir.)	affirmed in part; reversed in part
Bruno v. United States	308 U.S. 287 (1939)	Frankfurter	8-0	McReynolds (without opinion)	none	certiorari to the United States Court of Appeals for the Second Circuit (2d Cir.)	reversed
Pepper v. Litton	308 U.S. 295 (1939)	Douglas	8-0	none	none	certiorari to the United States Court of Appeals for the Fourth Circuit (4th Cir.)	reversed
Pearson, State Treasurer of Oregon v. McGraw	308 U.S. 313 (1939)	Douglas	7-1	Stone (opinion; with which Frankfurter concurred)	McReynolds (without opinion)	certiorari to the Oregon Supreme Court (Or.)	reversed
Weiss v. United States	308 U.S. 321 (1939)	Roberts	8-0	none	none	certiorari to the United States Court of Appeals for the Second Circuit (2d Cir.)	reversed
Ford Motor Company v. Beauchamp, Secretary of State of Texas	308 U.S. 331 (1939)	Reed	7-1	Black and Douglas (without opinions)	McReynolds (without opinion)	certiorari to the United States Court of Appeals for the Fifth Circuit (5th Cir.)	affirmed
Nardone v. United States	308 U.S. 338 (1939)	Frankfurter	6-1[c]	none	McReynolds (without opinion)	certiorari to the United States Court of Appeals for the Second Circuit (2d Cir.)	reversed
Jackson County v. United States	308 U.S. 343 (1939)	Frankfurter	8-0	McReynolds (without opinion); Black (opinion; with which Douglas concurred)	none	certiorari to the United States Court of Appeals for the Tenth Circuit (10th Cir.)	modified
Griffiths v. Commissioner of Internal Revenue	308 U.S. 355 (1939)	Frankfurter	8-0	none	none	certiorari to the United States Court of Appeals for the Seventh Circuit (7th Cir.)	affirmed
Buckstaff Bath House Company v. McKinley, Commissioner of the Department of Labor of Arkansas	308 U.S. 358 (1939)	Douglas	8-0	Reed (brief statement)	none	certiorari to the Arkansas Supreme Court (Ark.)	affirmed
Helis v. Ward	308 U.S. 365 (1939)	Douglas	8-0	none	none	certiorari to the United States Court of Appeals for the Fifth Circuit (5th Cir.)	affirmed
Chicot County Drainage District v. Baxter State Bank	308 U.S. 371 (1940)	Hughes	8-0	none	none	certiorari to the United States Court of Appeals for the Eighth Circuit (8th Cir.)	reversed
Postal Steamship Corporation v. El Isleo	308 U.S. 378 (1940)	Hughes	8-0	none	none	certiorari to the United States Court of Appeals for the Second Circuit (2d Cir.)	reversed
Haggar Company v. Helvering, Commissioner of Internal Revenue	308 U.S. 389 (1940)	Stone	8-0	none	none	certiorari to the United States Court of Appeals for the Fifth Circuit (5th Cir.)	reversed
American Federation of Labor v. National Labor Relations Board	308 U.S. 401 (1940)	Stone	8-0	none	none	certiorari to the United States Court of Appeals for the District of Columbia (D.C. Cir.)	affirmed
National Labor Relations Board v. International Brotherhood of Electrical Workers	308 U.S. 413 (1940)	Stone	8-0	none	none	certiorari to the United States Court of Appeals for the Sixth Circuit (6th Cir.)	reversed
LeTulle v. Scofield, Collector of Internal Revenue	308 U.S. 415 (1940)	Roberts	8-0	none	none	certiorari to the United States Court of Appeals for the Fifth Circuit (5th Cir.)	affirmed
General American Tank Car Corporation v. El Dorado Terminal Company	308 U.S. 422 (1940)	Roberts	8-0	none	none	certiorari to the United States Court of Appeals for the Ninth Circuit (9th Cir.)	reversed
Kalb v. Feuerstein	308 U.S. 433 (1940)	Black	8-0	none	none	appeal from the Wisconsin Supreme Court (Wis.)	reversed
Avery v. Alabama	308 U.S. 444 (1940)	Black	8-0	none	none	certiorari to the Alabama Supreme Court (Ala.)	affirmed
National Labor Relations Board v. Falk Corporation	308 U.S. 453 (1940)	Black	7-0[d]	none	none	certiorari to the United States Court of Appeals for the Seventh Circuit (7th Cir.)	reversed
Bonet v. Texas Company (P.R.), Inc.	308 U.S. 463 (1940)	Douglas	7-0[b]	none	none	certiorari to the United States Court of Appeals for the First Circuit (1st Cir.)	reversed
Higgins v. Smith	308 U.S. 473 (1940)	Reed	6-2	none	Roberts (opinion; joined by McReynolds)	certiorari to the United States Court of Appeals for the Second Circuit (2d Cir.)	reversed
Deputy v. du Pont	308 U.S. 488 (1940)	Douglas		Frankfurter (opinion; joined by Reed)	Roberts (opinion; joined by McReynolds)	certiorari to the United States Court of Appeals for the Third Circuit (3d Cir.)	reversed

[a] Butler took no part in the case
[b] Stone took no part in the case
[c] Reed took no part in the case
[d] McReynolds took no part in the case
