= Giorgio Nardone =

Italian psychologist (1958-)

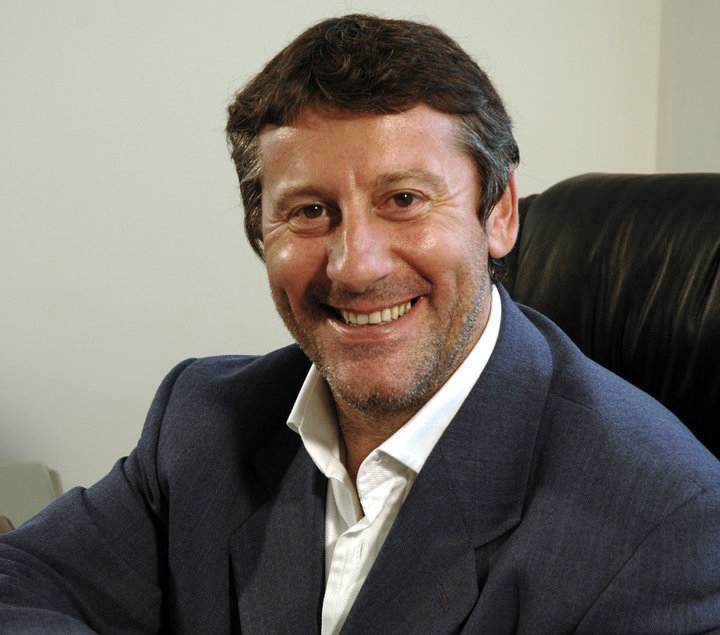
Giorgio Nardone

Giorgio Nardone (born 13 September 1958) is the Director of the Post Graduate School of Brief Strategic Psychotherapy, located in Arezzo, Italy and of the School of Managerial Training in Communication and Strategic Problem Solving, located in Arezzo and also in Florence, Italy. He is the co-founder, along with Paul Watzlawick, of the Centro di Terapia Strategica where he conducts work as a psychotherapist, professor, and researcher. He has authored and co-authored close to 27 publications, including many of his books which have translated from Italian into English, Spanish, French, Russian, and Japanese.

== Books ==
- Nardone G., Watzlawick, 1993 - The Art of Change: Strategic Therapy and Hypnotherapy Without Trance Jossey - Bass, San Francisco, USA
- Nardone G., 1996 - Brief Strategic Solution - Oriented Therapy of Phobic and Obsessive Disorders
- Nardone G., Watzlawick, P., 2005, Brief Strategic Therapy, Rowman & Littlefield Publishers Inc, MD, USA
- Nardone G., Portelli C., 2005 - Knowing Through Changing, The Evolution of Brief Strategic Therapy, Crown House Publishing, Carmarthen UK
- Nardone G., Portelli C., 2007 - Being Illogical to be More Logical in Journal of Brief, Strategic, and Systemic Therapies, volume 1, issue 1, April 2007
- Nardone G., Giannotti E., Rocchi R., 2008 - The Evolution of Family patterns and Indirect Therapy with Adolescents, Karnac Publishing, London
