= Nardone v. United States =

United States Supreme Court case

- Supreme Court of the United States

Argued November 14, 1939 Decided December 11, 1939
- Full case name: Nardone v. United States
- Citations: 308 U.S. 338 (more)

Holding
- Evidence procured by wiretapping in violation of the Communications Act of 1934 is inadmissible

Court membership
- Chief Justice Charles E. Hughes Associate Justices James C. McReynolds · Harlan F. Stone; Owen Roberts · Hugo Black; Stanley F. Reed · Felix Frankfurter; William O. Douglas

Case opinions
- Majority: Frankfurter, joined by Hughes, Butler, Stone, Black, Roberts, Douglas
- Dissent: McReynolds
- Reed took no part in the consideration or decision of the case.

Laws applied
- Communications Act of 1934

Nardone v. United States, 308 U.S. 338 (1939), was a U.S. Supreme Court case in which the Court ruled that evidence obtained via warrantless wiretaps, in violation of the Communications Act of 1934, was inadmissible in federal court. The Court ruled that use of evidence directly obtained from wiretapping, such as the conversations themselves, and indirectly, such as evidence obtained through knowledge gained from wiretapped conversations, was inadmissible in trial court.
