= Sibbach v. Wilson & Co. =

- Supreme Court of the United States

Argued December 17, 1940 Decided January 13, 1941
- Full case name: Sibbach v. Wilson & Company, Incorporated
- Citations: 312 U.S. 1 (more) 61 S. Ct. 422; 85 L. Ed. 479; 1941 U.S. LEXIS 1032

Case history
- Prior: 108 F.2d 415 (7th Cir. 1939); cert. granted, 309 U.S. 650 (1940).

Holding
- In a diversity jurisdiction case, important and substantial procedures are considered "Procedural" not "Substantive" and the Federal Rules of Civil Procedure apply.

Court membership
- Chief Justice Charles E. Hughes Associate Justices James C. McReynolds · Harlan F. Stone; Owen Roberts · Hugo Black; Stanley F. Reed · Felix Frankfurter; William O. Douglas · Frank Murphy

Case opinions
- Majority: Roberts, joined by Hughes, McReynolds, Stone, Reed
- Dissent: Frankfurter, joined by Black, Douglas, Murphy

Sibbach v. Wilson & Co., 312 U.S. 1 (1941), was a decision by the United States Supreme Court in which the Court held that under American law important and substantial procedures are not substantive but rather still considered procedural, and therefore federal law applies. Sibbach followed the seminal 1938 case Erie Railroad Co. v. Tompkins, and thus the decision whether to apply the law of the state of jurisdiction or uniform federal rules depended on whether the rule in question was procedural or substantive in nature.

== See also ==
- Erie doctrine
- List of United States Supreme Court cases, volume 312
