= Cox v. New Hampshire =

- Supreme Court of the United States

Argued March 7, 1941 Decided March 31, 1941
- Full case name: Cox, et al. v. State of New Hampshire
- Citations: 312 U.S. 569 (more) 61 S. Ct. 762; 85 L. Ed. 1049

Case history
- Prior: State v. Cox, 91 N.H. 137, 16 A.2d 508 (1940); probable jurisdiction noted, 61 S. Ct. 143 (1940).

Court membership
- Chief Justice Charles E. Hughes Associate Justices Harlan F. Stone · Owen Roberts; Hugo Black · Stanley F. Reed; Felix Frankfurter · William O. Douglas; Frank Murphy

Case opinion
- Majority: Hughes, joined by unanimous

Laws applied
- U.S. Const. amend. I

Cox v. New Hampshire, 312 U.S. 569 (1941), was a case in which the Supreme Court of the United States held that, although the government cannot regulate the contents of speech, it can place reasonable time, place, and manner restrictions on speech for the public safety. Here, the Court held that government may require organizers of any parade or procession on public streets to have a license and pay a fee.

Sixty-eight Jehovah's Witnesses had assembled at their church and divided into smaller groups that marched along sidewalks, displaying signs, and handing out leaflets advertising a meeting. During the march, groups of 15 to 20 people marched in single file down sidewalks in the district, interfering with hard foot travel.

In 1941, all 68 Jehovah's Witnesses were convicted in a New Hampshire municipal court for violating a state statute which prohibited parades and processions on public streets without a license. The defendants claimed that their First Amendment rights were violated including their rights to freedom of worship and freedom of assembly.

== Decision of the Court ==
Does the New Hampshire state statute that prohibits unlicensed parades violate the First Amendment's guarantees of freedom of speech and assembly as applied to the states by the Fourteenth Amendment?

No. Chief Justice Charles E. Hughes delivered the opinion for the unanimous Court. The Court held that a municipality's ability to impose regulations that create order and safety for its populace does not infringe on the civil liberties of its people. Because the statute in question only grants a town selectman or licensing board the limited authority to ensure that a proposed parade will not interfere with the proper uses of streets, there is not opportunity for it to wield undue or arbitrary power that would infringe on constitutional rights. The Court also held that there was no evidence that the statute had been administered unfairly in this case.

== Effects of the decision ==
Prior to the decision in Cox, the U.S. Supreme Court had struck down, under the First and Fourteenth Amendments, numerous ordinances imposing permit requirements on expressive activity in public places, such as streets and parks, because the ordinances gave government officials unlimited discretion whether to issue the permits. After Cox, local governments were allowed to regulate competing uses of public forums by using a permit scheme to impose reasonable time, place, and manner restrictions on those wishing to hold a march, parade, or rally.

The decision established the right of local governments to require a permit to conduct a parade or procession upon a public street. However, permit decisions had to be made according to uniform, nondiscriminatory standards based upon public convenience and safety to satisfy the Fourteenth Amendment. Because governments face greater costs in policing and overseeing parades, they are allowed to pass some expenses on to the groups conducting the events - and hence also have some regulatory power over the events.

Requiring licenses was thus found to be entirely consistent with also allowing time and place restrictions to prevent a public inconvenience. Validating permit requirements for parades meant that local governments received advance notice of parades allowing them the opportunity to plan policing activities to minimize disorder and inconvenience to passersby.

In addition, Cox allowed local governments to give a different degree of protection under the First and Fourteenth Amendments to those who communicated ideas by patrolling, marching, and picketing on streets and highways and those who communicated ideas by pure speech. Permit systems were deemed constitutionally valid so long as the discretion of the issuing official was limited to questions of times, places, and manners, and was not based on the content of the message. The reasonable time, place and manner restriction of Cox was subsequently applied to government attempts to regulate a wide range of religious, social, economic, and political activity.

== See also ==
- List of United States Supreme Court cases, volume 312
