= Schneider v. New Jersey =

Schneider v. State of New Jersey
- Supreme Court of the United States

Argued October 13, 16, 1939 Decided November 22, 1939
- Full case name: Schneider v. State of New Jersey (Town of Irvington)
- Citations: 308 U.S. 147 (more) 60 S. Ct. 146;84 L. Ed. 155; 1939 U.S. LEXIS 1115; 2 Lab. Cas. (CCH) ¶ 17,049; 5 L.R.R.M. 659

Case history
- Prior: Certiorari to the New Jersey Court of Errors and Appeals

Holding
- The Court held that the purpose of the ordinances (to keep the streets clean and of good appearance) was insufficient to justify prohibiting defendants from handing out literature to other persons willing to receive it.

Court membership
- Chief Justice Charles E. Hughes Associate Justices James C. McReynolds · Harlan F. Stone; Owen Roberts · Hugo Black; Stanley F. Reed · Felix Frankfurter; William O. Douglas

Case opinions
- Majority: Roberts, joined by Hughes, Butler, Stone, Black, Reed, Frankfurter, Douglas
- Dissent: McReynolds

Laws applied
- U.S. Const. amend I, U.S. Const. amend. XIV

Schneider v. State of New Jersey, 308 U.S. 147 (1939), was a United States Supreme Court decision that combined four similar appeals (Schneider v. State of New Jersey (Town of Irvington), Young v. People of the State of California, Snyder v. City of Milwaukee, Nichols et al. v. Commonwealth of Massachusetts), each of which presented the question whether regulations embodied in municipal ordinances abridged the First Amendment rights of freedom of speech and of the press secured against state invasion by the Fourteenth Amendment of the Constitution.

The appellants (Jehovah's Witnesses) were charged with a violation of a local ordinance that barred persons from distributing handbills on public streets or handing them out door-to-door.

== Representation ==
- Joseph F. Rutherford, with whom Mr. Hayden C. Covington was on the brief, for petitioner in No. 11.
- Robert I. Morris argued the cause, and Messrs. Meyer Q. Kessel and Joseph C. Braelow were on the brief, for respondent in No. 11.
- Osmond K. Fraenkel, with whom Carol King and Mr. A.L. Wirin were on the brief, for appellant in No. 13.
- Ray L. Chesebro, Frederick Von Schrader, Leon T. David, John L. Bland, and Bourke Jones submitted for appellee in No. 13.
- A.W. Richter, with whom Mr. Osmond K. Fraenkel was on the brief, for petitioner in No. 18.
- Carl F. Zeidler argued the cause, and Mr. Walter J. Mattison was on the brief, for respondent in No. 18.
- Sidney S. Grant and Osmond K. Fraenkel for appellants in No. 29.
- Edward O. Proctor, Assistant Attorney General of Massachusetts, with whom Mr. Paul A. Dever, Attorney General, was on the brief, for appellee in No. 29.

== Decision ==
In 1939, the U.S. Supreme Court held that the purpose of the ordinances to keep the streets clean and of good appearance was insufficient to justify prohibiting defendants from handing out literature to other persons willing to receive it. Any burden imposed upon the city authorities in cleaning and caring for the streets as an indirect consequence of such distribution resulted from the constitutional protection of the freedom of speech and press. Concerning the distribution of materials from house to house without a permit, the ordinance was void.

This right is not absolute, however. Municipalities may lawfully regulate the conduct of those using the streets, for the purpose of keeping them open and available for movement of people and property, so long as legislation to this end does not abridge the constitutional liberty of one rightfully upon the street to impart information through speech or the distribution of literature.

== See also ==
- List of United States Supreme Court cases, volume 308
- Lovell v. City of Griffin
