= Seneca Nation of Indians v. Christy =

- Supreme Court of the United States

Decided April 13, 1896
- Full case name: Seneca Nation of Indians v. Harrison B. Christy
- Citations: 162 U.S. 283 (more) 16 S. Ct. 828; 40 L. Ed. 970

Case history
- Prior: 2 N.Y.S. 546 (N.Y. Sup. 1888), aff'd, 27 N.E. 275 (N.Y. 1891)

Holding
- Whether a state cause of action is subject to a state statute of limitations does not present a federal question

Court membership
- Chief Justice Melville Fuller Associate Justices Stephen J. Field · John M. Harlan; Horace Gray · David J. Brewer; Henry B. Brown · George Shiras Jr. Edward D. White · Rufus W. Peckham

Case opinion
- Majority: Fuller, joined by unanimous
- Harlan and Brewer took no part in the consideration or decision of the case.

Seneca Nation of Indians v. Christy, 162 U.S. 283 (1896), was the first litigation of aboriginal title in the United States by a tribal plaintiff in the Supreme Court of the United States since Cherokee Nation v. Georgia (1831). It was the first such litigation by an indigenous plaintiff since Fellows v. Blacksmith (1857) and its companion case of New York ex rel. Cutler v. Dibble (1858). The New York courts held that the 1788 Phelps and Gorham Purchase did not violate the Nonintercourse Act, one of the provisions of which prohibits purchases of Indian lands without the approval of the federal government, and that (even if it did) the Seneca Nation of Indians was barred by the state statute of limitations from challenging the transfer of title. The U.S. Supreme Court declined to review the merits of lower court ruling because of the adequate and independent state grounds doctrine.

According to O'Toole and Tureen, "Christy is an important case in that it revived the concept that states had special powers to deal with Indian tribes within their borders."

Although the case has not been formally overruled, two Supreme Court decisions in the 1970s and 1980s have undone its effect by ruling that there is federal subject-matter jurisdiction for a federal common law cause of action for recovering possession based on the common-law doctrine of aboriginal title. Moreover, the New York courts' interpretation of the Nonintercourse Act is no longer good law. Modern federal courts hold that only Congress can ratify a conveyance of aboriginal title, and only with a clear statement, rather than implicitly.

== Background ==
James Clark Strong, lawyer for the Seneca

=== Conveyance ===
The land in question, which had been part of the Seneca Nation's traditional territory for centuries before the American Revolution, comprised part of the Phelps and Gorham Purchase, a tract of land disputed after the war between claims of New York and Massachusetts. By a December 16, 1786 interstate compact, the states agreed that Massachusetts would retain the proprietary rights and the pre-emption rights, but New York would retain governmental rights. After the adoption of the United States Constitution in 1787, the federal government ratified their compact.

Three private individuals—Robert Troup, Thomas L. Ogden, and Benjamin W. Rogers—obtained the proprietary and preemptive rights from Massachusetts. They executed a treaty of conveyance with the Seneca on August 31, 1826, purchasing 87,000 acres for $48,216. Massachusetts approved the conveyance, but the United States Senate was never consulted and never ratified the treaty, as required for treaties with Native American nations. In 1827, the money was deposited in Ontario Bank in Canandaigua, New York, and in 1855 it was paid to the United States treasury, which began remitting the interest to the Seneca Nation.

=== Dispute ===
The Seneca Nation could not have brought the lawsuit until 1845, when the New York legislature granted the nation the right to bring suits in courts of law and equity. The Seneca filed a petition with the Bureau of Indian Affairs on January 5, 1881, requesting restoration and possession of certain lands related to the Phelps and Gorham Purchase. This petition was ignored by the BIA.

The Seneca hired the lawyer James Clark Strong to represent them, a "prominent lawyer and civic-minded resident of Buffalo." Strong was a former lieutenant colonel in the Union army (brevetted to general after the war). He had a permanent limp from his wounds in the American Civil War. At the law practice of his brother, John C. Strong, he had also represented the Cayuga in a claim against New York state.

== Procedural history ==
=== New York trial court ===
The Seneca brought suit in the Circuit Court of Erie County, New York on October 13, 1885. The Seneca requested the ejectment of Harrison B. Christy from 100 acres of land in the town of Brant, New York (purchased from the Ogden Land Company), known as the "mile strip." These lands were formerly part of the Cattaraugus Indian Reservation, as established by the New York Treaty of Big Tree (1797).

The Seneca contended that the purchase was invalid because the treaty was not approved by the Senate, as required by the Constitution; therefore it violated the Nonintercourse Act. Christy's "answer consisted of a general denial, the plea of the statute of limitations of 20 years, and that the plaintiff had not the legal right, title, capacity, or authority to maintain the action."

=== New York intermediate appellate court ===
The Seneca claim disputed the Phelps and Gorham Purchase.

The General Term of the Fifth Department of the New York Supreme Court heard the intermediate appeal. Bradley J., writing for himself and Dwight J.J., affirmed. The court considered whether the Indians had properly surrendered the land and whether the consideration had been paid. As to the first question, the court noted that, while "in view of the known habits of Indians they may not be supposed to represent their occupation or possession by improvements or inclosures of all or great portions of their lands":

[I]n this case the abandonment and surrender were not only practically made, but have been characterized by such circumstances and by such recognition, not only by the Indians, but by the government, in such manner as to determine the situation, and in legal effect to sever the prior relation of the Indians to the lands from them. The quantity of land covered by the treaty of conveyance was large.

The court cited Johnson v. McIntosh (1823) for the proposition that: "[t]he title of the Indians was possessory, and embraced the right of occupancy only. And when abandoned by them the possession attached itself to the fee of the lands."

As to the second question, the court noted:

The suggestion that the entire amount of the purchase money was not paid, and that such fact is in the way of supporting the claim to the Indian title, is not sustained. We are not called upon to consider the effect of default in payment of any portion of the purchase money. The treaty recites the payment of it, and as no such question seems ever before to have been raised, or full payment questioned, either by government or the Indians, it must at this late day be assumed, until the contrary is quite clearly made to appear, that the contract in that respect was performed.

Finally, the court noted:

The plaintiff not being a corporation, and having no such corporate name, could not at common law maintain an action. This right, however, was more than 40 years ago conferred by statute, which, among other things, provides that the Seneca Nation of Indians may maintain any action of ejectment to recover the possession of any part of the Allegany and Cattaraugus reservations unlawfully withheld from them.

As a result, the intermediate appellate court did not reach the question of whether the statute of limitation applies.

=== New York Court of Appeals ===
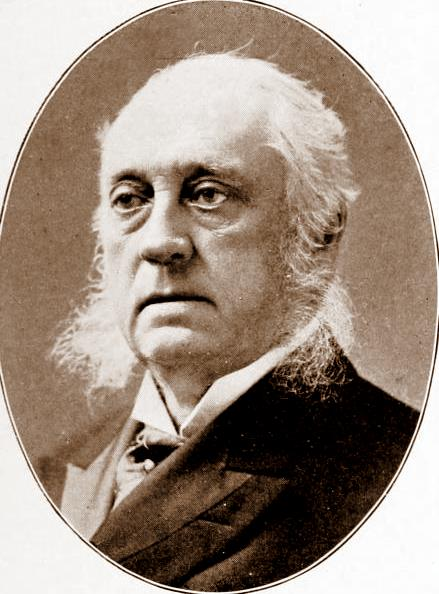
New York State Court Chief Justice Charles Andrews held that the conveyances were valid under the Nonintercourse Act, and that the claim was barred by the state statute of limitations.

Chief Justice Charles Andrews, writing for a unanimous New York Court of Appeals, affirmed.

Validity of the transaction

After reviewing the facts, Andrews began by arguing that there were many ways to extinguish aboriginal title. He said: "It is material to observe that there was no uniform procedure on the part of the purchasers from Massachusetts in acquiring the Indian title," and gave examples of conveyances he believed to have been implicitly ratified by the federal government. As to the Seneca argument that, after the ratification of the Constitution, only the federal government could extinguish aboriginal title, Andrews noted that:

These claims challenge the title not only of every purchaser and holder of lands within the boundaries of the grant of August 31, 1826, but also the title to many millions of acres of lands in this state, held under Indian treaties made by the state of New York with the Indian tribes within its borders, or under grants made by Indians to individuals under the authority of the state, where no treaty had been made between the United States and the Indian occupants.

Andrews expressed the view that the U.S. states, not the federal government, inherited from Great Britain the sole power to extinguish aboriginal title:

On the Declaration of Independence the colonies became sovereign states. They were so acknowledged by the treaty of peace of 1783, and Great Britain by that treaty ‘relinquished all claims to the government, property, and territorial rights' within the several colonies. It is the received opinion that the colonies succeeded to the title of the crown to all the ungranted lands within their respective boundaries, with the exclusive right to extinguish by purchase the Indian title, and to regulate dealings with the Indian tribes. ‘There was no territory in the United States,’ said JOHNSON, J., in Harcourt v. Gaillard, 12 Wheat. 523, ‘that was claimed in any other right than that of one of the confederated states; therefore there could be no acquisition of territory made by the United States distinct from or independent of some one of the United States.’

Andrews rejected the argument that the federal government had acquired Indian lands by treaty out of a legal requirement to do so:

But the dealing by the general government with the Indian tribes through treaties was resorted to as a convenient mode of regulating Indian affairs, and not because, as with other nations, it was the only mode, independently of the arbitrament of war, of dealing with them.

Andrews relied upon the argument of federal acquiescence:

The practical construction given by the state of New York to the federal constitution, as shown by the numerous treaties made by it with the Indian tribes, and the recognition by the federal authority of their validity, is very strong evidence that the clause in the federal constitution prohibiting the states from entering into treaties does not preclude a state, having the preemption right to Indian lands, from dealing with the Indian tribes directly, for the extinguishment of the Indian title.

Effect of the Nonintercourse Act

As to the Nonintercourse Act, Andrews questioned both whether it applied to purchases by a state and whether it applied to purchases within a state. However, Andrews proceed to assume that the act applied and held that it had not been violated. Andrews proceeded to argue that the treaty requirement of the Act was satisfied by state treaties:

The purchase must be made at a treaty, as in other cases. This insures publicity, and affords a protection against fraud. But the proviso does not require that the treaty should be one between the United States and the tribe from whom the purchase is made, as in the cases coming under the first clause of the section. It is sufficient if the purchase is made at a treaty held ‘under the authority of the United States,’ and in the ‘presence and with the approbation of the commissioner or commissioners of the United States,’ etc.

Andrews also placed reliance on the fact that later versions of the Act excluded the clause "or to any state, whether having the right of pre-emption or not" and instead simply prohibited acquisitions by persons.

Applicability of the statute of limitations

Independently, Andrews indicated he would have dismissed the action under the statute of limitations:

We are also of opinion that as the right of the plaintiff to sue was given by, and is dependent upon, the statute, the statute of limitations is a bar to the action. By the act of 1845, the actions thereby authorized are to be brought and maintained ‘in the same time’ as if brought by citizens of the state. The question is not whether an Indian title can be barred by adverse possession, or by state statutes of limitation. The point is that the plaintiff cannot invoke the special remedy given by the statute, without being bound by the conditions upon which it is given.

Andrews emphasized this latter ground because of his desire to prevent any similar lands claims by Indian tribes:

In view of the numerous Indian titles in this state originating in treaties by the state, or in purchases made with its sanction by individuals, we prefer to place our judgment on the broader ground, which will remove any cloud upon the validity of those titles.

== Opinion ==
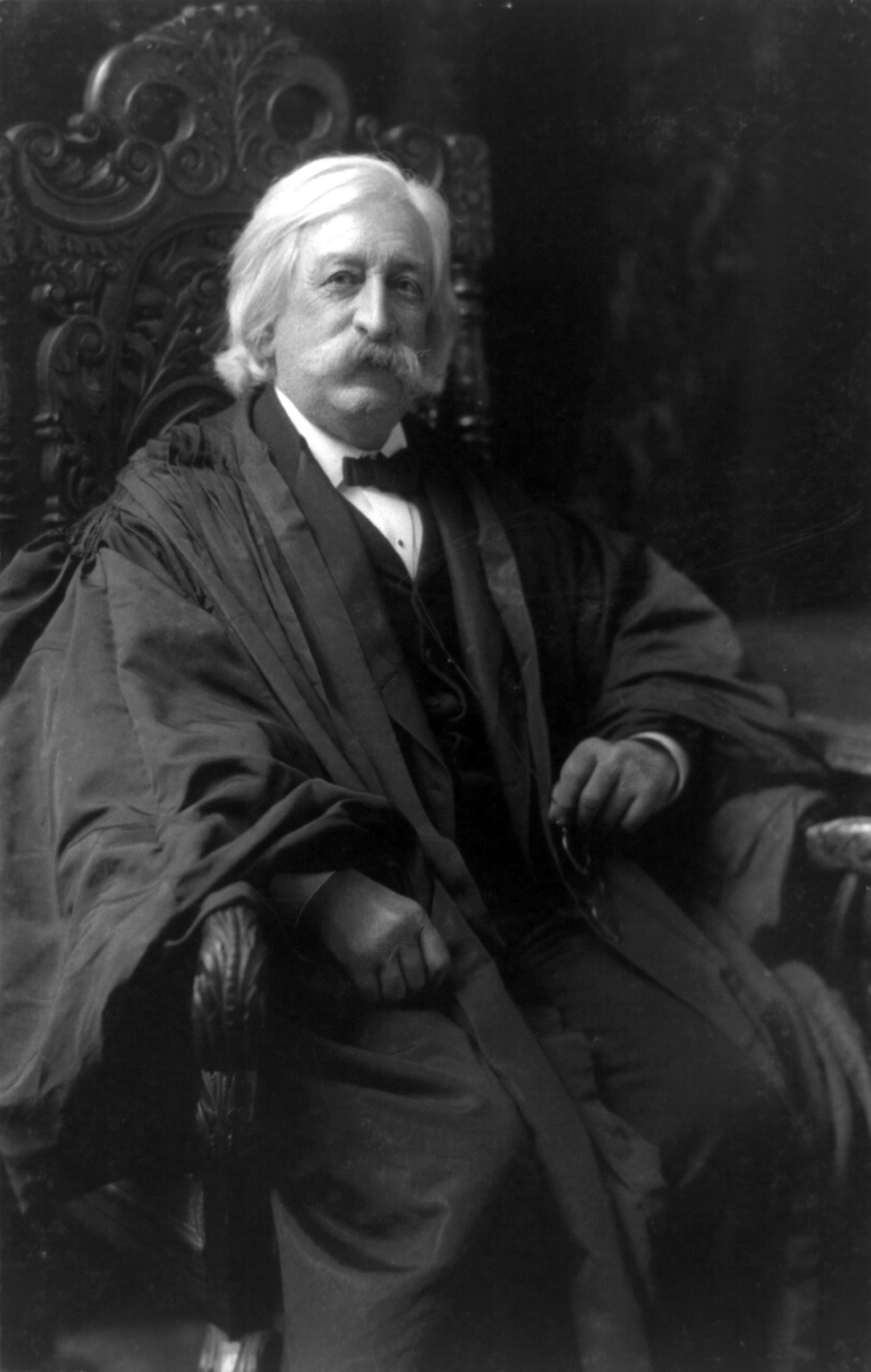
U.S. Supreme Court Chief Justice Melville Fuller declined to reach the merits because of the doctrine of adequate and independent state grounds.

Chief Justice Melville Fuller, for a unanimous court, dismissed the writ of error, relying on the adequate and independent state grounds for the New York Court of Appeals' decision. After reviewing the facts and the judgment below, he wrote that:

The proper construction of this enabling act, and the time within which an action might be brought and maintained thereunder, it was the province of the state courts to determine.

The Seneca Nation availed itself of the act in bringing this action, which was subject to the provision, as held by the court of appeals, that it could only be brought and maintained ‘in the same manner and within the same time as if brought by citizens of this state in relation to their private individual property and rights.’ Under the circumstances, the fact that the plaintiff was an Indian tribe cannot make federal questions of the correct construction of the act and the bar of the statute of limitations.

As it appears that the decision of the court of appeals was rested, in addition to other grounds, upon a distinct and independent ground, not involving any federal question, and sufficient in itself to maintain the judgment, the writ of error falls within the wellsettled rule on that subject, and cannot be maintained.

== Legacy ==
A 19th-century New York Times article claimed that "[t]he decision is one of local, state, and national importance alike . . . ." In 1998 Prof. Hauptman summed up the case by the following:

The Treaties of 1823 and 1826, although fraudulent at their roots, were allowed to stand. The legal obstacles to Indian land suits at the time made it almost impossible to obtain redress until monetary compensation was awarded the Senecas under the Indian Claims Commission in the late 1960s and early 1970s.

Seneca Nation has never been overruled. But, the effect of the decision was undone by rulings in Oneida Indian Nation of N.Y. State v. Oneida County (1974), known as Oneida I, and Oneida County v. Oneida Indian Nation of N.Y. State (1985), known as Oneida II, which held that there is a federal common law cause of action for ejectment based upon aboriginal title for which there is federal subject-matter jurisdiction. Therefore, Indian tribes no longer have to rely on state statutes for a cause of action. In the words of Prof. Hauptman, Oneida I "overturned one hundred forty-three years of American law."
