= United States v. Constantine =

- Supreme Court of the United States

Argued November 14, 1935 Decided December 9, 1935
- Full case name: United States v. Constantine
- Citations: 296 U.S. 287 (more) 56 S. Ct. 223; 80 L. Ed. 233; 1935 U.S. LEXIS 577; 35-2 U.S. Tax Cas. (CCH) ¶ 9655; 36-1 U.S. Tax Cas. (CCH) ¶ 9009; 16 A.F.T.R. (P-H) 1137; 1935 P.H. P2159

Case history
- Prior: Cert. to the Circuit Court of Appeals for the Fifth Circuit

Court membership
- Chief Justice Charles E. Hughes Associate Justices Willis Van Devanter · James C. McReynolds; Louis Brandeis · George Sutherland; Pierce Butler · Harlan F. Stone; Owen Roberts · Benjamin N. Cardozo

Case opinions
- Majority: Roberts, joined by Hughes, Van Devanter, McReynolds, Sutherland, Butler
- Dissent: Cardozo, joined by Brandeis and Stone

Laws applied
- Revenue Act of 1926

United States v. Constantine, 296 U.S. 287 (1935), was a case before the United States Supreme Court that concerned liquor laws and taxation. Congress placed a tax on liquor dealers who violate state liquor laws. The Court struck down the relevant portion of the Revenue Act of 1926 as an attempt to punish a state violation through taxation.

== Background ==
A Prohibition era federal law required that sellers of alcohol obtain a federal excise license which costs $25 if the holder was in compliance with state law but $1,000 if they were not. The appellee had paid the lower fee but was found to be in violation of Alabama law by selling malt liquor in a Birmingham restaurant that exceeded the strength allowed by state law. The federal government then pursued Constantine for the $975 difference even though the violation occurred after the repeal of Prohibition.

== Opinion of the court ==
The court ruled that the primary purpose of the tax law was to enforce police powers not to raise revenue. Since the repeal of the Eighteenth Amendment, the federal law was no longer enforceable.

== Dissents ==
Justice Cardozo, in an opinion joined by Justices Brandeis and Stone, dissented, arguing that Congress could have had any one of several non-punitive justifications for the statute.

== Subsequent history ==
National Federation of Independent Business v. Sebelius referenced the logic in this decision to determine whether the Affordable Care Act was a penalty or tax in terms of the Constitution. The Court held that it was a tax by "[d]isregarding the designation of the exaction, and viewing its substance and application."

== See also ==
- List of United States Supreme Court cases, volume 296
