= List of United States Supreme Court cases, volume 312 =

This is a list of United States Supreme Court cases from volume 312 of the United States Reports.

Case name	Citation	Date decided
Sibbach v. Wilson & Co.	312 U.S. 1	1941
Gorin v. United States	312 U.S. 19	1941
United States v. Cowden Manufacturing Company	312 U.S. 34	1941
A.C. Frost and Company v. Coeur D'Alene Mines Corporation	312 U.S. 38	1941
Beal v. Missouri Pacific Railroad Corporation	312 U.S. 45	1941
Hines v. Davidowitz	312 U.S. 52	1941
Reconstruction Finance Corporation v. J.G. Menihan Corporation	312 U.S. 81	1941
United States v. Gilliland	312 U.S. 86	1941
Rawlings v. Ray	312 U.S. 96	1941
United States v. Darby	312 U.S. 100	1941
OPP Cotton Mills, Inc. v. Department of Labor	312 U.S. 126	1941
Palmer v. Webster and Atlas National Bank	312 U.S. 156	1941
Philadelphia Company v. Dipple	312 U.S. 168	1941
Superior Bath House Company v. McCarroll	312 U.S. 176	1941
Huron Holding Corporation v. Lincoln Mine Operating Company	312 U.S. 183	1941
Armour and Company v. Alton Railroad Company	312 U.S. 195	1941
United States v. Goltra	312 U.S. 203	1941
Higgins v. Commissioner	312 U.S. 212	1941
United States v. Hutcheson	312 U.S. 219	1941
Phillips v. United States	312 U.S. 246	1941
Guggenheim v. Rasquin	312 U.S. 254	1941
Powers v. Commissioner	312 U.S. 259	1941
United States v. Ryerson	312 U.S. 260	1941
Woods v. City National Bank and Trust Company	312 U.S. 262	1941
Maryland Casualty Company v. Pacific Coal and Oil Company	312 U.S. 270	1941
Walker v. Johnston	312 U.S. 275	1941
Milk Wagon Drivers v. Meadowmoor Dairies, Inc.	312 U.S. 287	1941
American Federation of Labor v. Swing	312 U.S. 321	1941
Smith v. O'Grady	312 U.S. 329	1941
Browder v. United States	312 U.S. 335	1941
Warszower v. United States	312 U.S. 342	1941
Federal Trade Commission v. Bunte Brothers, Inc.	312 U.S. 349	1941
Nelson v. Sears, Roebuck and Company	312 U.S. 359	1941
Nelson v. Montgomery Ward and Company	312 U.S. 373	1941
Kelleam v. Maryland Casualty Company	312 U.S. 377	1941
Just v. Chambers	312 U.S. 383	1941
Helvering, Commissioner of Internal Revenue v. Hutchings	312 U.S. 393	1941
United States v. Pelzer	312 U.S. 399	1941
Ryerson v. United States	312 U.S. 405	1941
Equitable Life Insurance Company v. Halsey, Stuart and Company	312 U.S. 410	1941
National Labor Relations Board v. Express Publishing Company	312 U.S. 426	1941
Maass v. Higgins	312 U.S. 443	1941
Berry v. United States	312 U.S. 450	1941
Fashion Originators' Guild of America, Inc. v. Federal Trade Commission	312 U.S. 457	1941
Millinery Creator's Guild, Inc. v. Federal Trade Commission	312 U.S. 469	1941
Edwards v. United States	312 U.S. 473	1941
Breisch v. Central Railroad Company	312 U.S. 484	1941
Conway v. O'Brien	312 U.S. 492	1941
Railroad Commission v. Pullman Company	312 U.S. 496	1941
Missouri K. Pipe Line Company v. United States	312 U.S. 502	1941
Consolidated Rock Products Company v. Du Bois	312 U.S. 510	1941
Helvering, Commissioner of Internal Revenue v. Le Gierse	312 U.S. 531	1941
Estate of Keller v. Internal Revenue Service	312 U.S. 543	1941
Ex parte Hull	312 U.S. 546	1941
Hormel v. Helvering, Commissioner of Internal Revenue	312 U.S. 552	1941
Helvering, Commissioner of Internal Revenue v. Richter	312 U.S. 561	1941
Metropolitan Casualty Insurance Company v. Stevens	312 U.S. 563	1941
Cox v. New Hampshire	312 U.S. 569	1941
Harrison v. Schaffner	312 U.S. 579	1941
United States v. Sherwood	312 U.S. 584	1941
United States v. Chicago, Minneapolis, St. Paul and Pacific Railroad Company	312 U.S. 592	1941
United States v. Cooper Corporation	312 U.S. 600	1941
Public Service Commission v. Brashear Freight Lines, Inc.	312 U.S. 621	1941
Moore v. Illinois Central Railroad Company	312 U.S. 630	1941
Helvering, Commissioner of Internal Revenue v. Estate of Enright	312 U.S. 636	1941
Pfaff v. Commissioner	312 U.S. 646	1941
