= Valentine v. United States =

- Supreme Court of the United States

Argued October 12–13, 1936 Decided November 9, 1936
- Full case name: Jimmy Ray Valentine, Police Commissioner of New York City, et al. v. United States ex rel. B. Coles Neidecker; Together with No. 7, Valentine, Police Commissioner, et al. v. U.S. ex rel. George W. Neidecker; and No. 8, Valentine, Police Commissioner, et al. v. U.S. ex rel. Aubrey Neidecker
- Citations: 299 U.S. 5 (more) 57 S. Ct. 100; 81 L. Ed. 5; 1936 U.S. LEXIS 3

Case history
- Prior: Appeal from the 2nd Court of Appeals

Holding
- The Executive has no power to extradite citizens of the United States without binding authority through an Act of Congress.

Court membership
- Chief Justice Charles E. Hughes Associate Justices Willis Van Devanter · James C. McReynolds; Louis Brandeis · George Sutherland; Pierce Butler · Harlan F. Stone; Owen Roberts · Benjamin N. Cardozo

Case opinion
- Majority: Hughes, joined by Devanter, McReynolds, Brandeis, Sutherland, Butler, Roberts, Cardozo
- Stone took no part in the consideration or decision of the case.

Laws applied
- U.S. Const. Arts. I and II

Valentine v. United States, 299 U.S. 5 (1936), is known in the study of international criminal law for its contribution to the concept that while it is permissible for the United States to receive an accused without a treaty-based extradition, the United States itself will not extradite without authority found in statute or treaty.

In this case the respondents, native-born citizens of the United States, were charged with the commission of crimes in France. These crimes were among the extraditable offenses listed in the Franco-American Extradition Treaty of 1909. The respondents fled to the United States, were arrested in New York City on the request of the French authorities, and were held for extradition proceedings. The respondents sued to prevent their extradition from the United States to France under the Treaty of 1909. The respondents challenged the courts jurisdiction, arguing that because Article V of the Treaty of 1909 excepted citizens of the United States from extradition, the President had no constitutional authority to surrender the respondents to France.

Article V of the Treaty of 1909 stated that “Neither of the contracting Parties shall be bound to deliver up its own citizens or subjects under the stipulations of this convention.”

The Circuit Court of Appeals reversed the orders of the District Judge, sustained the contention of the respondents, and directed their discharge. Certiorari was granted by the U.S. Supreme Court.

The Court stated that the surrender of US citizens by the government must find its sanction in U.S. law. Although extradition is a federal power, the power to provide for extradition is not confided to the Executive in the absence of treaty or legislative provision. The proceedings against the respondents must be authorized by law. Since that legal authority does not exist unless it is given by an act of Congress or by the terms of a treaty, it is not enough that the statute or treaty does not deny the power to surrender a citizen. It must be found that a statute or treaty confers such a power. The Court looked to the Treaty of 1909 to determine whether the power to surrender the respondents in this instance was conferred by the treaty itself. The treaty explicitly denies any obligation to surrender citizens, but save an obligation the court looked to determine whether the treaty contained a grant of power to surrender a citizen. The Court affirmed the decree of the Circuit Court and held that the President’s power, in absence of statute conferring an independent power, must be found in the terms of the treaty and that, as the treaty with France fails to grant the necessary authority, the President is without the power to surrender the respondents.
