= Fox Film Corp. v. Muller =

- Supreme Court of the United States

Argued November 15, 1935 Decided December 9, 1935
- Full case name: Fox Film Corporation v. Muller
- Citations: 296 U.S. 207 (more) 56 S. Ct. 183; 80 L. Ed. 158; 1935 U.S. LEXIS 1094; 1935 Trade Cas. (CCH) ¶ 55,093

Case history
- Prior: Appealed to the Minnesota State Supreme Court, 192 Minn. 212, 255 N.W. 845 (1934); cert. granted, 293 U.S. 550 (1934); dismissed as improvidently granted, 294 U.S. 696 (1935); final judgment affirmed, 194 Minn. 654, 260 N.W. 320 (1935); cert. granted, 295 U.S. 730 (1935).

Holding
- Where there is an independent question of state law which is adequate to support the state court's judgment, the U.S. Supreme Court has no jurisdiction.

Court membership
- Chief Justice Charles E. Hughes Associate Justices Willis Van Devanter · James C. McReynolds; Louis Brandeis · George Sutherland; Pierce Butler · Harlan F. Stone; Owen Roberts · Benjamin N. Cardozo

Case opinion
- Majority: Sutherland, joined by Van Devanter, McReynolds, Brandeis, Butler, Stone, Roberts, Cardozo
- Hughes took no part in the consideration or decision of the case.

Laws applied
- U.S. Const.

Fox Film Corp. v. Muller, 296 U.S. 207 (1935), was a case in which the Supreme Court of the United States held that it cannot exert certiorari jurisdiction over a case in which there is an adequate and independent state law ground for the state court's final judgment.

== Facts ==
Plaintiff Fox Film Corporation sued defendant Muller in the state trial court of Minnesota, alleging that Muller had breached two contracts to exhibit the company's motion pictures. Muller's defense was that the contract was invalid under the Sherman Antitrust Act. The trial court found for Muller, first determining that the contract was invalid under the Sherman Act. The Minnesota Supreme Court affirmed, and the plaintiffs petitioned the U.S. Supreme Court for certiorari. When it was discovered that the judgment was not final, the writ of certiorari was dismissed as improvidently granted. The case was then remanded back to the state supreme court, which framed the question on appeal as whether the arbitration clause was severable from the rest of the contract.

The state supreme court followed the judgment of the U.S. Supreme Court in the case of United States v. Paramount Famous Lasky Corporation, 282 U.S. 30 (1930), which held that a similar contract was illegal in its entirety. The court then determined that the arbitration clause was not severable from the rest of the contract, rendering the entire agreement void.

== Decision ==
The issue on appeal was whether a question of federal law was involved in the Minnesota Supreme Court's decision. Justice Sutherland, writing for a unanimous court, held that whether a federal question existed was irrelevant, because where there is an independent question of state law which is adequate to support the state court's judgment, the U.S. Supreme Court has no jurisdiction. The severability of a contractual clause was an issue of state law, and the invalidity of the arbitration clause had already been determined by the U.S. Supreme Court in the Paramount case. The state court's determination of the non-severability of the unlawful clause was thus adequate to render the contract invalid, and was independent of any question of federal law.
