= Adequate and independent state ground =

Legal doctrine in the United States

The adequate and independent state ground doctrine is a doctrine of United States law governing the power of the U.S. Supreme Court to review judgments entered by state courts.

== Introduction ==
It is part of the basic framework of the American legal system that the U.S. Supreme Court is the ultimate arbiter of questions of federal law but the state courts are the ultimate arbiters of the laws of each state. See, e.g., Hortonville Joint School District No. 1. v. Hortonville Education Ass’n, 426 U.S. 482, 488 (1976) (“We are, of course, bound to accept the interpretation of [State] law by the highest court of the State.”). Thus, generally speaking, the U.S. Supreme Court has the authority (“jurisdiction”) to review state court determinations of federal law, but lacks jurisdiction to review state court determinations of state law. See 28 U.S.C. § 1257.

This general rule is simple to apply in cases clearly involving only one body of law. If that law is federal, then the U.S. Supreme Court has jurisdiction to review the state court judgment; if it is state law, then it does not. However, because litigants can (and often do) raise federal claims in state courts, many cases are not so simple, and this general rule breaks down. Indeed, state courts often dismiss cases raising federal claims because they fail to comply with state-law procedures, and in some cases federal and state law are not clearly distinct; instead they are intertwined. The adequate and independent state ground doctrine provides certain exceptions to this general rule and guides the U.S. Supreme Court’s exercise of jurisdiction over these complex cases.

== Doctrine ==
The adequate and independent state ground doctrine states that when a litigant petitions the U.S. Supreme Court to review the judgment of a state court which rests upon both federal and non-federal (state) law, the U.S. Supreme Court does not have jurisdiction over the case if the state ground is (1) “adequate” to support the judgment, and (2) “independent” of federal law. See Michigan v. Long, 463 U.S. 1032, 1038 (1983) (“It is, of course, incumbent upon this Court to ascertain for itself whether the asserted non-federal ground independently and adequately supports the judgment.” (internal quotation marks omitted)); Fox Film Corp. v. Muller, 296 U.S. 207, 210 (1935) (“[W]here the judgment of a state court rests upon two grounds, one of which is federal and the other non-federal in character, our jurisdiction fails if the non-federal ground is independent of the federal ground and adequate to support the judgment.”); Murdock v. City of Memphis, ("[W]hether there exist other matters in the record actually decided by the State court which are sufficient to maintain the judgment of that court, notwithstanding the error in deciding the Federal question. In [that case] the court would not be justified in reversing the judgment of the State court.").

The “adequacy” prong primarily focuses on state court dismissals of federal claims on state procedural grounds, as procedural requirements are by definition logically antecedent. Antecedent state-law grounds (i.e., state rules of procedure) are adequate to support a judgment unless they (1) are arbitrary, unforeseen, or otherwise deprive the litigant of a reasonable opportunity to be heard, see, e.g., Staub v. City of Baxley, 355 U.S. 313, 319-20 (1958), or (2) impose an undue burden on the ability of litigants to protect their federal rights, see, e.g., Felder v. Casey, 487 U.S. 131, 138 (1988). See Herb v. Pitcairn ("We are not permitted to render an advisory opinion, and if the same judgment would be rendered by the state court after we corrected its views of federal laws, our review could amount to nothing more than an advisory opinion".)

The “independence” prong focuses on decisions where the state and federal rules are not clearly distinct. If it is not "apparent from the four corners” of the opinion that the judgment rests on an independent state law rule, then, unless it is “necessary or desirable” to obtain clarification from the state court itself, the Supreme Court will presume that the decision rested in part on federal law, thereby rendering it reviewable. Michigan v. Long, 463 U.S. 1032, 1040 & n.6. Furthermore, when federal law limits the states’ ability to change the definition of state-created legal interests, the Supreme Court has jurisdiction to review the state court’s characterization of the law both before and after the change. For example, the U.S. Supreme Court routinely reviews state court determinations of state property law to determine whether a litigant has been deprived of “property” within the meaning of the Due Process clause.

== Sample cases ==
- Murdock v. Memphis, 87 U.S. 590 (1875)
- Seneca Nation of Indians v. Christy, 162 U.S. 283 (1896)
- Fox Film Corp. v. Muller, 296 U.S. 207 (1935)
- Michigan v. Long, 463 U.S. 1032 (1983)
