= Constitutionality of the National Popular Vote Interstate Compact =

Issue in U.S. Constitutional law

There is ongoing legal debate about the constitutionality of the National Popular Vote Interstate Compact in the United States. At issue are interpretations of the Compact Clause of Article I, Section X, and states' plenary power under the Presidential Electors Clause of Article II, Section I.

== Compact Clause ==
The Compact Clause of Article I, Section X of the United States Constitution states that "No State shall, without the Consent of Congress ... enter into any Agreement or Compact with another State". In a report released in October 2019, the Congressional Research Service (CRS) cited the U.S. Supreme Court's ruling in Virginia v. Tennessee (1893) as stating that the words "agreement" and "compact" are synonyms, and that explicit congressional consent of interstate compacts is not required for agreements "which the United States can have no possible objection or have any interest in interfering with". However, the Court required explicit congressional consent for interstate compacts that are "directed to the formation of any combination tending to the increase of political power in the States, which may encroach upon or interfere with the just supremacy of the United States"—meaning where the vertical balance of power between the federal government and the compacting state governments is altered in favor of the compacting state governments—which the Court reaffirmed in New Hampshire v. Maine (1976), U.S. Steel Corp. v. Multistate Tax Commission (1978), Cuyler v. Adams (1981), and Northeast Bancorp v. Federal Reserve Board of Governors (1985).

The CRS report states that "Whether the NPV initiative requires congressional consent under the Compact Clause first requires a determination as to whether NPV even constitutes an interstate compact." Akhil Amar, one of the compact's framers, has argued that because the NPVIC does not create a "new interstate governmental apparatus" and because "cooperating states acting together would be exercising no more power than they are entitled to wield individually", the NPVIC probably does not constitute an interstate compact and cannot contravene the Compact Clause. Conversely, the CRS report cites the Court's opinion in Northeast Bancorp as suggesting that a requirement of a new interstate governmental entity is a sufficient but not a necessary condition for an agreement to qualify as being an interstate compact under the Compact Clause. Instead, the CRS report cites the Court's opinions in Virginia v. Tennessee and Northeast Bancorp as stating that any agreement between two or more states that "cover[s] all stipulations affecting the conduct or claims of the parties", prohibits members from "modify[ing] or repeal[ing] [the agreement] unilaterally", and requires "'reciprocation' of mutual obligations" constitutes an interstate compact. Noting that the NPVIC meets all of those requirements, the CRS report concludes that "the initiative can be described as an interstate compact."

=== Vertical balance of power shift ===
As part of concerns about whether the NPVIC would shift power from the federal government to state governments, at least two legal commentators have suggested that the NPVIC would require explicit congressional approval because it would remove the possibility of contingent elections for President being conducted by the U.S. House of Representatives under the 12th and 20th Amendments. The CRS report notes that the outcomes of only two presidential elections (1800 and 1824) have been decided by a contingent election, and whether the loss of such elections would be a de minimis diminishment of federal power is unresolved by the relevant case law. The report references Multistate Tax Commission as stating that the "pertinent inquiry [with respect to the Compact Clause] is one of potential, rather than actual, impact on federal supremacy" in that the potential erosion of an enumerated power of the U.S. House of Representatives could arguably require explicit congressional approval. National Popular Vote Inc. has stated that if removing the possibility of contingent elections is grounds for unconstitutionality (rather than the requirement of explicit congressional approval), then Congress setting the size of the House at an odd number, as it did in 1911 (resulting in an odd number of electors until 1961), was also unconstitutional because it precluded the possibility of a tie in the Electoral College between presidential candidates.

However, under the 12th Amendment, contingent elections are not held only in the event of a tie but rather if no candidate receives "a majority of the whole number of Electors appointed", which can occur regardless of whether the size of the Electoral College is set at an even or odd number if more than two candidates receive electoral votes. In 1824, no electoral vote tie occurred, four candidates for President (Andrew Jackson, John Quincy Adams, William H. Crawford, and Henry Clay) received electoral votes, and all four candidates failed to reach the 131 votes necessary for a majority of the Electoral College, which was set at 261 electors. While there have been no contingent elections for President since 1824, more than two candidates have received non-faithless electoral votes in 10 presidential elections since (1832, 1836, 1856, 1860, 1892, 1912, 1924, 1948, 1960, and 1968). Since the compacting states under the NPVIC would be awarding their electoral votes to the presidential ticket that wins the national popular vote, contingent elections for Vice President being conducted by the U.S. Senate would also be precluded by the NPVIC. The only contingent election for Vice President was held following the 1836 presidential election.

Ratified in 1804, the 12th Amendment revised the procedure by which the Electoral College operates and contingent elections are conducted. The 12th Amendment required that contingent elections be held before March 4 and this effectively delegated their conduct to lame-duck sessions of the House and Senate, but this requirement would be superseded by Sections 1 and 2 of the 20th Amendment. Ratified in 1933, Section 1 of the 20th Amendment changed the expiration date for congressional terms of office to January 3 and presidential and vice presidential terms of office to January 20, and Section 2 of the 20th Amendment changed the commencement date of congressional sessions to January 3 from the first Monday of December under the Congressional Sessions Clause of Article I, Section IV. Consequently, incoming sessions of the House and Senate now conduct contingent elections rather than lame-duck sessions. However, under the 12th Amendment, state delegations to the House of Representatives still cast a single vote as a delegation in contingent elections for President, and the District of Columbia has no vote in contingent elections for President or Vice President.

In the contingent election that followed the 1800 presidential election (which was conducted under the Electoral College Clause of Article II, Section I), the House of Representatives did not elect Thomas Jefferson as President over Aaron Burr (who were both members of the Democratic-Republican Party) until the 36th ballot of the contingent election on February 17, 1801—only 15 days before the presidential term of John Adams expired on March 4—because the contingent election was conducted by the lame-duck session of the 6th United States Congress when the House of Representatives was controlled by the Federalist Party and because there was an even number of state delegations to the House of Representatives casting ballots. Section 3 of the 20th Amendment provides that if a President-elect is not chosen before Inauguration Day that the Vice President-elect acts as President until a President is chosen in the event that contingent elections conducted by Congress fail to elect a President or Vice President by Inauguration Day, while the Vice President-elect becomes the President if the President-elect dies before Inauguration Day.

Section 4 of the 20th Amendment grants Congress the power to pass legislation to specify what occurs in contingent elections if one of the candidates the House of Representatives or Senate chooses from dies. While a Vice President-elect that succeeds to the Presidency under Section 3 of the 20th Amendment due to the death of the President-elect has the authority to appoint a Vice President once in office under Section 2 of the 25th Amendment, if a Vice President-elect becomes Acting President under Section 3 of the 20th Amendment, the Vice President-elect could serve an entire four-year term as an Acting President and not succeed to the Presidency if the President-elect that fails to qualify does not die before Inauguration Day. National Popular Vote Inc. has argued that eliminating the possibility of contingent elections would be a collateral benefit of the NPVIC, and has noted that Congress has never viewed its power to conduct contingent elections as a factor when increasing the size of the House of Representatives.

Norman R. Williams has argued that the 1787 Constitutional Convention delegates chose the Electoral College to choose the President largely in reaction to the experience during the Confederation period where state governors were often chosen by state legislatures and wanting the new federal government to have an executive branch that was effectively independent of the legislative branch. Citing political scientist Gary L. Gregg, National Popular Vote Inc. notes that the Constitutional Convention delegates did not expect the Electoral College to regularly fail to produce a candidate with a majority of electoral votes and routinely require the House of Representatives to choose the President in a contingent election. Also, members of Congress may object to the counting of electoral votes of any state or the District of Columbia at the Electoral College vote count under the Electoral Count Act (ECA) and the Electoral Count Reform Act (ECRA). Section 109 of the ECRA provides that the total number of electors appointed for determining a majority under the 12th Amendment is reduced by the number of electors for whom objections are sustained when electors have not been lawfully certified, while electors providing votes that have not been regularly given still count towards the total number of electors appointed and the votes are deducted from the electoral vote total of the candidate to whom they were cast.

=== Horizontal balance of power shifts ===
The CRS report goes on to cite the Supreme Court's rulings in Florida v. Georgia (1855) and in Texas v. New Mexico and Colorado (2018) as recognizing that explicit congressional consent is also required for interstate compacts that alter the horizontal balance of power among the compacting states, and notes that the Court suggested in Multistate Tax Commission and Northeast Bancorp that the Compact Clause is also concerned with preserving the horizontal balance of power between compacting and non-compacting states to interstate compacts (even though the Court rejected the claims that the non-compacting states saw a loss of power in both cases). Jennifer S. Hendricks and Bradley T. Turflinger have argued that the NPVIC would not alter the power of non-compacting state governments because all state governments would retain their right to select the electors of their choosing and their mode of appointment.

Likewise, National Popular Vote Inc. has noted that the Supreme Court dismissed a complaint filed by Delaware and 11 other states against New York in 1966 under the Court's original jurisdiction over the political impact of the mode of appointment by which New York chose its presidential electors. In Article III, Section II, the Case or Controversy Clause states "The judicial Power [of the Supreme Court and such inferior courts the Congress ordains and establishes] shall extend to all Cases, in Law and Equity, arising under this Constitution... [and] the Laws of the United States... to Controversies to which the United States shall be a Party... [and] to Controversies between two or more States", while the Original Jurisdiction Clause states that "In all Cases ... in which a State shall be Party, the supreme Court shall have original Jurisdiction." In 2020, the Supreme Court issued an order dismissing Texas v. Pennsylvania on the basis that the plaintiff state (Texas) lacked standing under Article III to sue the defendant states (Pennsylvania, Georgia, Michigan, and Wisconsin) due to the plaintiff state failing to demonstrate a judicially cognizable interest in how any other state conducts its elections.

Other legal commentators have argued that the power of non-compacting states would be altered because, under the NPVIC, a state's power in determining the outcomes of presidential elections would be changed from the percentage of electors it has in the Electoral College to the state's percentage of the popular vote, rendering the right of non-compacting state governments to appoint their own electors pro forma as the Electoral College outcome would be decided ex ante rather than ex post. Also, former Federal Election Commission member Hans von Spakovsky has noted that unlike the interstate compact the Court ruled on in Multistate Tax Commission that allowed compacting states to remain "free to withdraw at any time", the NPVIC precludes compacting states from withdrawing from the compact during the last six months of a presidential term and argues that the withdrawal limitation potentially renders the compact unconstitutional under the Presidential Electors Clause of Article II, Section I. National Popular Vote Inc. disputes that congressional consent to the NPVIC is required due to the withdrawal limitation. Under the ECRA, states may only appoint presidential electors under state election laws enacted prior to Election Day.

=== Congressional approval and the Supremacy Clause ===
Ian J. Drake has argued that because Cuyler v. Adams held that congressional approval of interstate compacts makes them federal laws, Congress can only approve interstate compacts without violating the Supremacy Clause of Article VI if it has the enumerated or implied powers to create such laws itself. Drake argues that Congress cannot consent to the NPVIC because Congress has no legislative power to alter the Electoral College under Article I, Section VIII, and citing the Supreme Court's ruling in McPherson v. Blacker (1892), Drake notes that Article II, Section I neither enumerates nor implies any powers to or of Congress to create laws to choose the mode of appointment by which states appoint their presidential electors and only states that Congress may "determine the Time of [choosing] the Electors, and the Day on which they shall give their Votes". The CRS report also notes that the Constitution provides the federal government no authority in determining the members of the Electoral College.

Conversely, a March 2001 report issued by the General Accounting Office (GAO) noted that the Supreme Court in Burroughs v. United States (1934) ruled that the authority of Congress to regulate presidential elections is not limited to determining the time by which states must choose their presidential electors and the date by which presidential electors must vote in upholding the Federal Corrupt Practices Act, because that law "[n]either in purpose nor in effect ... interfere[d] with the power of a state to appoint electors or the manner in which their appointment shall be made" and that regulating the operations of national political committees was "if not beyond the power of [a] state to deal with at all, are beyond its power to deal with adequately". In light of the federal functions that presidential electors serve, the Court concluded that "To say that Congress is without power to pass appropriate legislation to safeguard [presidential elections] from the improper use of money to influence the result is to deny to the nation in a vital particular the power of self-protection. Congress, undoubtedly, possesses that power, as it possesses every other power essential to preserve the departments and institutions of the general government from impairment or destruction, whether threatened by force or by corruption."

Additionally, Congress has the power to set the size of the Electoral College in setting its own size under the House Apportionment Clause of Article I, Section II, the Admission to the Union Clause of Article IV, Section III, and Section 2 of the 14th Amendment. The 62nd United States Congress increased the size of the House to 435 under the Apportionment Act of 1911, while the 71st United States Congress capped the size of the House at 435 under the Reapportionment Act of 1929. Under the 23rd Amendment, Congress is delegated the power to create laws directing the mode of appointment for the presidential electors of the District of Columbia while the District itself makes the appointment. The 87th United States Congress amended the District of Columbia Code in 1961 to require that the District's electors be appointed in accordance with the popular vote in the District before the 93rd United States Congress delegated the authority to choose the mode of appointment to the D.C. Council under the District of Columbia Home Rule Act in 1973. Also, the 111th United States Congress did not enact a joint resolution objecting to the bill passed by the D.C. Council in 2010 adjoining the District to the NPVIC during the bill's 30-day congressional review period, thereby allowing the District to join the compact.

Nonetheless, Ian J. Drake and at least five other legal commentators have argued that to replace the Electoral College with a national popular vote may only be done by a constitutional amendment as outlined in Article V. National Popular Vote Inc. disputes that a constitutional amendment is necessary for altering the current method of electing the President because the NPVIC would not abolish the Electoral College, and because states would only be using the plenary power to choose the method by which they appoint their electors that is already delegated to them under the Presidential Electors Clause. The CRS report notes that the text of the Compact Clause places no restriction on the subject matter of interstate compacts, and that the "functional view of the Compact Clause" established in Virginia v. Tennessee that interstate compacts "will not be invalidated for lack of congressional consent" was upheld by the Supreme Court in New Hampshire v. Maine, Multistate Tax Commission, Cuyler v. Adams, and Northeast Bancorp. However, the CRS report cites Cuyler v. Adams, along with St. Louis & San Francisco Railway Co. v. James (1896) and Petty v. Tennessee-Missouri Bridge Commission (1959), as establishing that the consent power of Congress is absolute and that Congress can require or deny consent to any interstate compact if it so chooses (and possibly even if the compact does not require explicit consent).

As such, National Popular Vote Inc. has stated that it is seeking support in Congress for the compact. Citing Metropolitan Washington Airports Authority v. Citizens for Abatement of Aircraft Noise, Inc. (1991) as stating that if an enumerated power under the Constitution is legislative, then "Congress must exercise it in conformity with the bicameralism and presentment requirements of Article I, Section VII", and noting that the Republican River Compact was initially vetoed by President Franklin D. Roosevelt in 1942, the CRS report states that if an interstate compact requires explicit congressional approval, it must be approved by both houses of Congress and signed into law by the President in order to become law. Ian J. Drake argues that approval of the NPVIC by Congress would meet none of the non-justiciability requirements specified by the Supreme Court in Baker v. Carr (1962) to constitute a political question, and the CRS report concludes in agreement with Drake that if the NPVIC were to be enacted by the necessary number of states, it would likely become the source of considerable litigation, and it is likely that the Supreme Court will be involved in any resolution of the constitutional issues surrounding it.

== Plenary power doctrine ==
Proponents of the compact, such as Akhil and Vikram Amar (the compact's original framers), as well as U.S. Representative Jamie Raskin from Maryland's 8th congressional district, have argued that states have the plenary power to appoint electors in accordance with the national popular vote under the Presidential Electors Clause, which states that "Each State shall appoint, in such Manner as the Legislature thereof may direct, a Number of Electors, equal to the whole Number of Senators and Representatives to which the State may be entitled in the Congress". The CRS report, Vikram Amar, and other legal commentators have also cited the Supreme Court's rulings in McPherson v. Blacker (1892) and Arizona State Legislature v. Arizona Independent Redistricting Commission (2015) as recognizing that states have wide discretion in selecting the method by which they appoint their electors. The CRS report notes that the only facial limitation on a state's power to appoint presidential electors under the Presidential Electors Clause is the number of electors it is awarded and that "no Senator or Representative, or Person holding an Office of Trust or Profit under the United States, shall be appointed an elector", while the text of the clause places no restriction on the method or mode of appointment by which states may appoint their electors.

However, the CRS report cites the Court's opinions in Williams v. Rhodes (1968) and Oregon v. Mitchell (1970) that struck down state laws or upheld federal preemption of state laws under the 14th Amendment concerning the appointment of electors and concludes that a state's power to select the method by which its electors are appointed is not absolute. Likewise, the GAO report notes that the 15th Amendment, the 19th Amendment, the 24th Amendment, and the 26th Amendment ban states from appointing presidential electors upon the basis of polls where voting rights for eligible citizens are denied or abridged on account of race, color, previous condition of servitude, sex, failure to pay a poll tax or other tax, or age for citizens 18 years of age or older, and that Congress has the power to create laws under those amendments to enforce those voting rights protections and the 14th Amendment to enforce the Equal Protection Clause in states that appoint presidential electors upon the results of a poll.

In Chiafalo v. Washington (2020), the majority opinion written by Associate Justice Elena Kagan noted that while a state legislature's appointment power gives it far-reaching authority over its electors (and extends to enforcing laws banning and penalizing electors voting faithlessly), "Checks on a State's power to appoint electors, or to impose conditions on an appointment, can theoretically come from anywhere in the Constitution", further noting that states may not select electors in a manner that would violate the Equal Protection Clause or adopt conditions for elector appointments that impose additional qualifications for candidates (as the latter could conflict with the Presidential Qualifications Clause of Article II, Section I). In his concurring opinion, Associate Justice Clarence Thomas stated that the "powers related to electors reside with States to the extent that the Constitution does not remove or restrict that power"; Thomas cites Williams v. Rhodes as stating that powers reserved to the states concerning electors cannot "be exercised in such a way as to violate express constitutional commands." While recognizing that the question had not been presented in the case, the majority opinion also stated that "nothing in this opinion should be taken to permit the States to bind electors to a deceased candidate."

In upholding a California election law that denied ballot access to independent candidates that had a registered affiliation with a political party within one year of a primary election, the Supreme Court noted in Storer v. Brown (1974) that "the States have evolved comprehensive, and in many respects complex, election codes regulating in most substantial ways, with respect to both federal and state elections, the time, place, and manner of holding primary and general elections, the registration and qualifications of voters, and the selection and qualification of candidates." In U.S. Term Limits, Inc. v. Thornton (1995), the Court clarified that state election laws regulating ballot access and election administration do not amount to additional qualifications for elected office because such laws "[regulate] election procedures and [do] not ... [render] a class of potential candidates ineligible". In Moore v. Harper (2023), the Court held that the Presidential Electors Clause and the Congressional Elections Clause of Article I, Section IV "[do] not vest exclusive and independent authority in state legislatures to set the rules regarding federal elections" within their respective states in rejection of independent state legislature theory (ISL), ruling that laws passed by state legislatures pursuant to the clauses are not only restrained by the federal constitution and federal law but remain subject to judicial review by state courts, presentment to state governors, and the constraints of state constitutions.

The 12th Amendment requires that "no person constitutionally ineligible to the office of President shall be eligible to that of Vice-President". Section 3 of the 20th Amendment provides that if a President-elect fails to qualify before Inauguration Day that the Vice President-elect acts as President until a President has qualified, and if neither a President-elect nor a Vice President-elect has qualified, Congress is delegated the power to declare who will act as President or create a selection process by which an Acting President is chosen until a President or Vice President has qualified. The 80th United States Congress included "failure to qualify" as a condition for presidential succession under the Presidential Succession Act of 1947 in the event that the Electoral College attempts to elect candidates constitutionally ineligible under the Presidential Qualifications Clause, the Impeachment Judgments and Punishments Clause of Article I, Section III, Section 3 of the 14th Amendment, and the 22nd Amendment. The No Religious Test Clause of Article VI states "no religious Test shall ever be required as a Qualification to any Office or public Trust under the United States."

In Fitzgerald v. Green (1890) and Bush v. Gore (2000), the Supreme Court held that presidential electors are state government officials rather than federal government officials. In Torcaso v. Watkins (1961), the Supreme Court ruled that religious qualifications to hold a public office under a state government violated the Establishment and Free Exercise Clauses of the 1st Amendment as applied to the states by the Equal Protection Clause (rather than the No Religious Test Clause). Section 3 of the 14th Amendment also requires that "No person shall be a[n] ... elector of President and Vice President... who, having previously taken an oath, as a member of Congress, or as an officer of the United States, or as a member of any State legislature, or as an executive or judicial officer of any State, to support the Constitution of the United States, shall have engaged in insurrection or rebellion against the same, or given aid or comfort to the enemies thereof." In Trump v. Anderson (2024), the Supreme Court held that state governments are not authorized to enforce Section 3 of the 14th Amendment against federal officeholders including the Presidency.

=== Equal protection and the VRA ===
A 2008 Columbia Law Review article by Columbia Law School student David Gringer suggested that the NPVIC could potentially violate Sections 2 and 5 of the Voting Rights Act of 1965 (VRA). However, in 2012, the U.S. Justice Department Civil Rights Division declined to challenge California's entry into the NPVIC under Section 5 of the Act, and the October 2019 CRS report notes that the U.S. Supreme Court decision in Shelby County v. Holder (2013), which invalidated Section 4(b) of the VRA, has rendered Section 5 currently inoperable. In response to Gringer's argument that the NPVIC would violate Section 2 of the VRA, FairVote's Rob Richie says that the NPVIC "treats all voters equally", and National Popular Vote Inc. has stated "The National Popular Vote bill manifestly would make every person's vote for President equal throughout the United States in an election to fill a single office (the Presidency). It is entirely consistent with the goal of the Voting Rights Act."

Citing the per curiam decision of Bush v. Gore as stating that state governments cannot "value one person's vote over that of another" in vote tabulation as well as the Court's opinion in Richardson v. Ramirez (1974), Norman R. Williams has argued that the NPVIC would violate the Equal Protection Clause because it does not require and cannot compel uniform election laws across both compacting and non-compacting states that regulate vote tabulation, voting machinery usage, voter registration, mail-in voting, election recounts, and felony and mental disability disenfranchisement. National Popular Vote Inc. counters that the text of the 14th Amendment states that "No state shall ... deny to any person within its jurisdiction the equal protection of the laws", that there is no precedent for claims of interstate violations of the Equal Protection Clause, and that because Bush v. Gore was addressing intrastate rather than interstate non-uniformity, the NPVIC does not violate the Equal Protection Clause.

In Williams v. Rhodes, the Supreme Court held that "State laws enacted pursuant to [Article II, Section I] ... to regulate the selection of presidential electors must meet the requirements of the Equal Protection Clause" in striking down an Ohio election law requiring that new political parties seeking ballot access for their candidates in presidential elections in Ohio provide petitions with a number of registered voter signatures equal to at least 15 percent of all votes cast in a preceding gubernatorial election in Ohio, while independent candidates were not required to do so or political parties whose candidates had received ballot access and at least 10 percent of all votes cast in the preceding gubernatorial election. In Bolling v. Sharpe (1954), the Supreme Court held that school segregation in the District of Columbia was unconstitutional under the Due Process Clause of the 5th Amendment because while the 5th Amendment does not contain an equal protection clause and the 14th Amendment applies only to the states, the "concepts of equal protection and due process ... are not mutually exclusive."

In light of the Court's ruling in Brown v. Board of Education (1954) that prohibited the states from maintaining racially segregated public schools, the Court concluded in Bolling that since public school segregation was "not reasonably related to any proper governmental objective" and that "it would be unthinkable that the same Constitution would impose a lesser duty on the Federal Government" than the states, school segregation in the District of Columbia imposed on black children "a burden that constitute[d] an arbitrary deprivation of their liberty in violation of the Due Process Clause." In so ruling, the Court established the reverse incorporation doctrine that requires equal protection under the laws of the federal government by the Due Process Clause of the 5th Amendment that would later be invoked in Schneider v. Rusk (1964), Frontiero v. Richardson (1973), Weinberger v. Wiesenfeld (1975), Buckley v. Valeo (1976), Califano v. Goldfarb (1977), Adarand Constructors, Inc. v. Peña (1995), and United States v. Windsor (2013).

=== Election administration and voter qualifications ===
National Popular Vote Inc. argues that Congress has the authority to create a federal recount law. The CRS report notes that in Oregon v. Mitchell the Supreme Court upheld Congress lowering the minimum voting age in presidential elections to 18 years and a minimum residency duration requirement for voter registration and a uniform rule for absentee voting in presidential elections that Congress enacted. The GAO report cites the latter holding from Oregon v. Mitchell on Section 202 of the Voting Rights Act Amendments of 1970 with the Court's opinion in Burroughs v. United States as construing the authority of Congress to regulate the administration of presidential elections as being broader than stated in Article II, Section I. However, the GAO report also noted that the precise parameters of that authority is not as clearly established as it is for congressional elections because Article II, Section I is textually more limited than the Congressional Elections Clause, and also because the amount of federal legislation related to the administration of presidential elections is relatively limited and federal case law is as well by extension—although, in upholding the National Voter Registration Act of 1993 (NVRA), the report noted that federal appellate courts have ruled that the broad authority given to Congress to regulate the administration of congressional elections has been extended to presidential elections.

For congressional elections, the GAO report notes that the Supreme Court held in Smiley v. Holm (1932) that Congress has a general supervisory power over all aspects of the administration of congressional elections under the Congressional Elections Clause where Congress "may supplement ... regulations or ... substitute its own" to the extent where Congress has the power to "provide a complete code for congressional elections." The GAO report goes on to note that the Court extended the power of Congress to supervise the administration of congressional general elections to congressional primary elections in United States v. Classic (1941) under both the Congressional Elections Clause and the Necessary and Proper Clause of Article I, Section VIII. In United States v. Classic, the Supreme Court stated that "While in a loose sense, the right to vote for representatives in Congress is sometimes spoken of as a right derived from the states, ... this statement is true only in the sense that the states are authorized by the Constitution, to legislate on the subject as provided by [Article I, Section II], to the extent that Congress has not restricted state action by the exercise of its powers to regulate elections under [Article I, Section IV] and its more general power under [the Necessary and Proper Clause] ... 'to make all laws which shall be necessary and proper for carrying into execution the foregoing powers [and all other powers vested in the Constitution in the government of the United States, or in any department or officer thereof].'"

In the 8–1 ruling within the four-part decision of Oregon v. Mitchell in which no majority opinions were filed, (Note: In Marks v. United States (1977), the Supreme Court ruled that "when a fragmented Court decides a case and no single rationale explaining the result enjoys the assent of five Justices, 'the holding of the Court may be viewed as that position taken by those Members who concurred in the judgments on the narrowest grounds'", citing the plurality opinion of Associate Justices Potter Stewart, Lewis F. Powell, and John Paul Stevens in Gregg v. Georgia (1976) that in turn cited the Court's decision in Furman v. Georgia (1972).) the Supreme Court held Section 202 of the 1970 VRA Amendments to be constitutional under Section 5 of the 14th Amendment to enforce the Privileges or Immunities Clause. In a unanimous ruling, the Court held that Section 201 of the 1970 VRA Amendments that banned the use of literacy tests as a voter qualification in federal, state, and local elections was constitutional under Section 2 of the 15th Amendment. In one of two 5–4 rulings on Section 302 of the 1970 VRA Amendments, the Court held that where Section 302 lowered the voting age in federal elections to 18 years was constitutional under Section 5 of the 14th Amendment to enforce the Equal Protection Clause. In his opinion in Oregon v. Mitchell, Associate Justice Hugo Black cited Smiley v. Holm, Burroughs v. United States, and United States v. Classic in upholding Section 302 in federal elections under the Congressional Elections Clause and the Necessary and Proper Clause, and not to enforce the Equal Protection Clause as argued by Associate Justices William J. Brennan, Byron White, and Thurgood Marshall in a single opinion and William O. Douglas in a separate opinion. Less than seven months after Oregon v. Mitchell was decided in December 1970, the 26th Amendment was ratified by three-fourths of the states under Article V by July 1971, prescribing a minimum voting age in federal, state, and local elections and superseding the Oregon v. Mitchell Section 302 holdings with respect to minimum voting age as a voter qualification.

In Arizona v. Inter Tribal Council of Arizona, Inc. (2013), the Supreme Court ruled that while a state voter registration requirement had been permissibly preempted by the NVRA under the Congressional Elections Clause and that the power that the clause delegates to Congress is "none other than the power to pre-empt", the Court also concluded that the Congressional Elections Clause "empowers Congress to regulate how federal elections are held, but not who may vote in them" per the House Electors Qualifications Clause of Article I, Section II and the 17th Amendment that require that "the electors in each State shall have the qualifications requisite for electors of the most numerous branch of the state legislature." Considered with the text of the Presidential Electors Clause, and the opinions in Oregon v. Mitchell written by Associate Justices Hugo Black, William O. Douglas, John Marshall Harlan II, and Potter Stewart (the last of which was joined by Chief Justice Warren E. Burger and Associate Justice Harry Blackmun), the Court concluded that the Oregon v. Mitchell Section 302 holding for federal elections was of minimal precedential value to its decision and that the federal government is delegated no power under the Congressional Elections Clause to prescribe voter qualifications in federal elections.

In response to various issues with election administration during the 2000 presidential election, the 107th United States Congress passed the Help America Vote Act (HAVA) in 2002 that mandated various administrative requirements for federal elections with respect to voting systems, provisional voting, posting voting information at polling places (including sample ballots), statewide voter registration databases, voter identification, and voter registration by mail, and created the Election Assistance Commission (EAC) to create regulations under HAVA and transferred the authority to enforce the NVRA from the Federal Election Commission to the EAC. The Federal Voting Assistance Program was created under the Federal Voting Assistance Act of 1955 to assist military service members, civilian federal government employees, and their families to vote by absentee ballot. Congress also passed the Voting Accessibility for the Elderly and Handicapped Act in 1984 to mandate accessibility requirements for the elderly and handicapped to voter registration facilities and polling places for federal elections, and passed the Uniformed and Overseas Citizens Absentee Voting Act (UOCAVA) in 1986 to create absentee voting registration requirements for state governments to allow military service members and expatriates to register for federal elections. While UOCAVA has been challenged under the Equal Protection Clause, it has been upheld by federal district courts and federal appellate courts. UOCAVA was amended under the Military and Overseas Voter Empowerment Act in 2009.

Additionally, as the GAO report noted, the Supreme Court upheld congressional authority under the Federal Corrupt Practices Act in Burroughs v. United States to regulate campaign finance in presidential elections to prevent corruption because that law did not interfere with the power of states to appoint presidential electors or choose their mode of appointment. The Congressional Research Service has noted in reports that the Supreme Court and lower federal courts have held that certain federal restrictions on campaign finance under the Federal Election Campaign Act (FECA) and the Bipartisan Campaign Reform Act (BCRA) violate the Freedom of Speech Clause of the 1st Amendment, specifically those on independent expenditures, candidate self-financed contributions or expenditures (e.g. by personal loans), contributions to candidates whose opponents self-finance, aggregate contribution limits, and contributions from minors. However, the CRS also noted that other categories of restrictions on campaign finance under the FECA, the BCRA, and the Hatch Act have, with exceptions, generally not seen significant legal challenges or been upheld in furtherance of compelling or sufficiently important government interests in preventing quid pro quo corruption, the appearance of corruption, or political patronage.

Such restrictions include base contribution limits, restrictions on contributions from corporations or labor unions directly from general treasuries, pay-to-play contributions from federal contractors, contributions from foreign nationals, contributions made through conduits, restrictions on coordinated expenditures and contributions by political parties or other political action committees, prohibitions on conversion of contributions for candidate personal use expenditures (except child care expenditures incurred as a direct result of campaign activity), prohibitions of solicitation for contributions by members of Congress, candidates for Congress, congressional staff, or federal employees from other federal officers or employees or federal contractors, contributions made by congressional staff and other federal employees to members of Congress who are their employers, contributions as a condition of employment required by members of Congress or congressional staff, solicitation of or making contributions in federal workspaces, and mandatory advertising disclaimer and financial disclosure and reporting requirements.

With respect to contributions by foreign nationals specifically, the CRS noted that the Supreme Court in 2012 affirmed the ruling of the District of Columbia U.S. District Court in Bluman v. Federal Election Commission (2011) that held (with Judges Brett Kavanaugh, Ricardo M. Urbina, and Rosemary M. Collyer presiding) that there is a compelling government interest in restricting the participation of foreign citizens in democratic self-government to prevent foreign influence on the U.S. political process, concluding "foreign citizens do not have a constitutional right to participate in, and thus may be excluded from, activities of democratic self-government." The District Court ruling cited the Supreme Court's ruling in Bernal v. Fainter (1984) that held that foreign citizens may be excluded from activities "intimately related to the process of self-government", and also cited the Supreme Court's ruling in Sugarman v. Dougall (1973) that stated that "citizenship is a permissible criterion for limiting [voting] rights" where the Supreme Court also stated that it "has never held that aliens have a constitutional right to vote ... under the Equal Protection Clause." Under Section 216 of the Illegal Immigration Reform and Immigrant Responsibility Act of 1996, the 104th United States Congress designated non-citizen voting in federal elections as a felony by punishment of a fine or imprisonment. However, as U.S. Representative Jamie Raskin and political scientists Ron Hayduk and Marcela García-Castañon have noted, non-citizen suffrage was permitted in at least 40 states from the time of the ratification of the federal constitution in 1788 until 1926.

=== Symmetric federalism and the Guarantee Clause ===
Northwestern University Law Review published a comment written by Northwestern University School of Law student Kristin Feeley that argued that the principle of symmetric federalism in the Guarantee Clause of Article IV, Section IV that states "The United States shall guarantee to every State in this Union a Republican Form of Government" is violated by the NPVIC because "no state [may] legislate for any other state. Placing no constitutional limit on state power over electors ... creates the ... potential for [compacting] states to form a superstate and render the [non-compacting] states irrelevant in the election of the President." Additionally, Cato Institute Vice President John Samples has argued that the NPVIC would effectively eliminate the federal character of presidential elections by eliminating the states as electoral districts. Conversely, Bradley T. Turflinger, citing New York v. United States (1992), Bush v. Gore, and Fitzgerald v. Green has argued that the federal government would be in violation of the Guarantee Clause if it required congressional approval of the NPVIC because it would encroach upon state governments' sovereignty over their own legislative processes (i.e. the power of state legislatures to prescribe how presidential electors are appointed under the Presidential Electors Clause) and make state government officials (i.e. presidential electors) accountable to the federal government rather than their local electorates.

The CRS report notes that while the Court's opinion in McPherson v. Blacker emphasized that the variety of state laws that existed shortly after the ratification of the Constitution indicates that state legislatures have multiple alternative "modes of choosing the electors", no state at the time of the ratification appointed their electors based on the results of the national popular vote. Citing the Court's opinion in U.S. Term Limits, Inc. v. Thornton that reaffirmed the Court's ruling in Powell v. McCormack (1969) as interpreting analogous language, the CRS report and Norman R. Williams note that the Court concluded that states cannot exercise their delegated powers over the election of members of Congress under the Congressional Elections Clause in a way that would "effect a fundamental change in the constitutional structure" and that such change "must come not by legislation adopted either by Congress or by an individual State, but rather—as have other important changes in the electoral process—through the amendment procedures set forth in Article V." The majority opinion in Thornton (written by Associate Justice John Paul Stevens) concluded that term limits for public office amount to a qualification because term limits "unquestionably restrict the ability of voters to vote for whom they wish", and noted that when term limits were applied to the Presidency, the term limits were created by a constitutional amendment (i.e. the 22nd Amendment).

Citing McCulloch v. Maryland (1819) as stating that "No political dreamer was ever wild enough to think of breaking down the lines which separate the States, and of compounding the American people into one common mass", the concurring opinion in Thornton (written by Associate Justice Anthony Kennedy who filed it separately in addition to joining with the majority) argued that while the political identities of individual states were an essential component of the federal balance of power, the political identity of the people of the United States as a whole exists dually with their identities as the people of each state, and that term limits imposed by states in congressional elections were unconstitutional because states were infringing upon the federal character of congressional elections when creating them. Citing the same excerpt from McCulloch v. Maryland, the dissenting opinion in Thornton (written by Associate Justice Clarence Thomas) argued that the people of each state retain a separate political identity when ratifying the U.S. Constitution, and disagreed with the majority opinion's conclusion that the powers of states to conduct their own congressional elections are delegated and instead agreed with the petitioners' argument that such powers are reserved under the 10th Amendment. In dicta, the dissenting opinion argued that states may establish qualifications for their own presidential electors if "those qualifications pass muster under other constitutional provisions", but that states have "no reserved power to establish qualifications for the office of President... [b]ecause ... no State may legislate for another State".

In correspondence to the majority opinion's analysis in Thornton of the 1787 Constitutional Convention and the history of state-imposed term limits and additional qualifications for members of Congress, Williams notes that the Convention explicitly rejected a proposal to elect the President by a national popular vote, and that all of the systems adopted by state legislatures to appoint electors in the wake of the ratification of the Constitution (discretionary appointment by the state legislature, popular election by electoral district, statewide winner-takes-all election) appointed electors directly or indirectly in accordance with voter sentiment within their respective states and not on the basis of votes cast outside of their states. In every presidential election from 1788 through 1828, multiple state legislatures selected their electors by discretionary appointment, while the South Carolina General Assembly did so in every presidential election through 1860, and the Florida Legislature and the Colorado General Assembly selected their presidential electors by discretionary appointment in 1868 and 1876 respectively. From 1788 through 1836, at least one state appointed its electors based on the popular vote in electoral districts, while since 1972 and 1992 respectively, Maine and Nebraska have appointed only two of their presidential electors in each election upon the statewide popular vote and the remainder upon the popular vote in their states' congressional districts.

In correspondence to the Court's analysis of congressional elections history, Williams notes that no state has ever appointed their electors in accordance with the national popular vote—even though every state since 1880 has appointed its electors upon the results of a poll, which would enable the statewide vote counts to be aggregated. The CRS report and Williams also note that the Court in McPherson v. Blacker was upholding a law passed by the Michigan Legislature to appoint its electors by popular vote in electoral districts, and in contrast to the NPVIC, in accordance with voter sentiment within Michigan rather than the country as a whole. Williams concludes that because the Court's decision in McPherson to uphold the Michigan election law followed a comparable analysis of the Constitutional Convention debates and, in the words of the Court, of the "contemporaneous practical exposition of the Constitution", the scope of states' Article II authority does not extend to allowing states to appoint presidential electors in accordance with the national popular vote.

Also, in holding in National Labor Relations Board v. Noel Canning (2014) that the Recess Appointments Clause of Article II, Section II does not authorize the President to make appointments while the Senate is in pro forma sessions, the Court cited McCulloch v. Maryland and Marbury v. Madison (1803) in concluding that "The longstanding 'practice of the government' ... can inform [the] determination of 'what the law is'". National Popular Vote Inc. counters that the Constitutional Convention also rejected proposals having electors selected by popular vote in districts and having state legislatures appoint electors directly, and argue instead that the language of Article II does not prohibit the use of any of the methods that were rejected by the Convention. Due to a lack of a precise precedent and limited case law, the CRS report concludes that whether states are allowed to appoint their electors in accordance with the national popular vote under Article II is an open question and will likely remain unresolved until a future Court ruling in a case challenging the constitutionality of the NPVIC.

== See also ==
- National Popular Vote Interstate Compact
- Interstate compact
- United States Electoral College
- Federalist No. 68

== Works cited ==
- Whitaker, L. Paige (May 17, 2023). Campaign Finance Law: An Analysis of Key Issues, Recent Developments, and Constitutional Considerations for Legislation (Report). Congressional Research Service.
- Report on the Electoral Count Act of 1887: Proposals for Reform (PDF) (Report). United States House Committee on House Administration. January 2022. Archived from the original (PDF) on May 18, 2023.
- Rybicki, Elizabeth; Whitaker, L. Paige (December 8, 2020). Counting Electoral Votes: An Overview of Procedures at the Joint Session, Including Objections by Members of Congress (Report). Congressional Research Service.
- Neale, Thomas H. (October 6, 2020). Contingent Election of the President and Vice President by Congress: Perspectives and Contemporary Analysis (Report). Congressional Research Service.
- Whitaker, L. Paige (September 8, 2020). Political Campaign Contributions and Congress: A Legal Primer (Report). Congressional Research Service.
- Shelly, Jacob D. (July 10, 2020). Supreme Court Clarifies Rules for Electoral College: States May Restrict Faithless Electors (Report). Congressional Research Service.
- Neale, Thomas H.; Nolan, Andrew (October 28, 2019). The National Popular Vote (NPV) Initiative: Direct Election of the President by Interstate Compact (Report). Congressional Research Service.
- Williams, Norman R. (2012). "Why the National Popular Vote Compact is Unconstitutional". BYU Law Review. 2012 (5). J. Reuben Clark Law School: 1523–1580. Archived from the original on May 6, 2021.
- Rossiter, Clinton, ed. (2003). The Federalist Papers. Signet Classics. ISBN 9780451528810.
- Gamboa, Anthony H. (March 13, 2001). Elections: The Scope of Congressional Authority in Election Administration (PDF) (Report). General Accounting Office.
