= Independent state legislature theory =

Judicially rejected American legal theory

The independent state legislature theory or independent state legislature doctrine (ISL) is a judicially rejected legal theory that posits that the Constitution of the United States delegates authority to regulate federal elections within a state to that state's elected lawmakers without any checks and balances from state constitutions, state courts, governors, ballot initiatives, or other bodies with legislative power (such as constitutional conventions or independent commissions). In June 2023, in the case Moore v. Harper, the Supreme Court ruled in a 6–3 decision that the Elections Clause of the U.S. Constitution does not give state legislatures sole power over elections and rejected the ISL.

Where state legislatures enact laws that conflict with their state constitutions, including provisions added to those constitutions through ballot initiatives passed by a state's citizens, proponents of ISL argue that only the federal courts, not state courts, can resolve conflicts between state laws and state constitutions with respect to administration of federal elections within a state.

The primary argument made successfully against ISL is the danger of concentrating control of elections in one part of a state's government, which would be an undemocratic violation of centuries-old precedents of federalism, separation of powers, and constitutional democracy.

== History ==
The doctrine first appeared in legal arguments raised by attorneys for then-presidential candidate George W. Bush, seeking to stop the recount of votes in Florida during the 2000 U.S. presidential election. The ISL theory has arisen in 2022 in the context of congressional redistricting, the process whereby each state adopts new congressional districts every ten years using updated census data.

In the case of Moore v. Harper, Republican state lawmakers in North Carolina had asked the U.S. Supreme Court to overrule the North Carolina Supreme Court's determination that congressional districts North Carolina lawmakers had drawn to favor Republican candidates in races for the U.S. Congress violated the North Carolina Constitution's prohibition on partisan gerrymandering. The Court previously rejected ISL in 2015, though four Supreme Court justices later voiced interest in adopting some version of the doctrine. The Supreme Court held in a 6–3 decision in Moore in June 2023 that the Elections Clause did not give state legislatures unchecked authority over federal elections, repudiating the ISL. (Note: Moore v. Harper, 600 U.S. ___ (June 27, 2023).)

As a matter of constitutional interpretation, ISL had been fiercely contested. While often defended on originalist grounds, numerous originalist scholars filed amicus briefs with the Supreme Court in Moore rejecting the theory.

== Role of Charles Pinckney ==
Charles Pinckney, then a delegate of the Constitutional Convention, and otherwise an active member of South Carolina's government; purportedly suggested the following clause in 1787, which was reported to the United States Secretary of State John Quincy Adams in an 1818 draft of his notes.

Each State shall prescribe the time & manner of holding Elections by the People for the house of Delegates & the House of Delegates shall be the judges of the Elections returns & Qualifications of their members.

The appellants of Moore v. Harper cite Pinckney's report to Adams – so-called "Pinckney Plan" – as supporting their claims, but Pinckney himself was unsure whether he had sent the correct draft to be archived in 1818 (32 years after the convention). James Madison as well as some modern historians dispute the version Pinckney chose as being the correct one.

== Interpretation of the theory ==
No majority ruling of the U.S. Supreme Court has explicitly relied on ISL to determine the outcome of a case, and the Court has expressly rejected the doctrine in Arizona State Legislature v. Arizona Independent Redistricting Commission (2015) and Moore v. Harper (2023).

=== 19th century ===
During the Massachusetts Constitutional Convention of 1820–1821, James T. Austin proposed including a provision in the Massachusetts Constitution that would limit the power of the Massachusetts legislature to redraw new congressional districts every two years. This proposal was rejected by other convention delegates as in violation of the Elections Clause of the U.S. Constitution, with delegate Justice Joseph Story arguing that such an amendment would amount to the Convention "assuming a control over the Legislature which the constitution of the United States does not justify."

In 1873, the Supreme Court of Mississippi ruled that a provision of the Mississippi Constitution requiring all general elections to be held biannually did not limit Mississippi's legislature's discretion to set the timing of congressional elections under the Elections Clause.

The Supreme Court of the United States indicated some approval for ISL in dicta from its 1892 ruling in McPherson v. Blacker. (Note: McPherson v. Blacker, 146 U.S. 1, 13 S. Ct. 3, 36 L. Ed. 869 (1892)) In that case, the Court assessed the constitutionality of a Michigan law regulating the selection of presidential electors. In upholding the law, the Court quoted approvingly from an 1874 Senate committee report containing language recognizing the absolute power of state legislatures to appoint presidential electors. The committee report went on to say that such power "cannot be taken from them or modified by their State constitutions." (Note: McPherson v. Blacker, 146 U.S. 1, 35, 13 S. Ct. 3, 10, 36 L. Ed. 869 (1892)) However, because the issue before the court in Blacker was whether the Michigan law was consistent with the federal constitution, the court made no direct holding addressing ISL.

=== 20th century ===
Throughout most of the 20th century, both state courts and the Supreme Court of the United States largely ignored or rejected ISL. For example, in 1916, the Supreme Court ruled in State of Ohio ex rel. Davis v. Hildebrant that an amendment to the Ohio Constitution allowing the public to reverse the state legislature's laws was constitutional, even when reversing the legislature's adoption of new congressional districts. (Note: State of Ohio ex rel. Davis v. Hildebrant, 241 U.S. 565, 570, 36 S. Ct. 708, 710, 60 L. Ed. 1172 (1916)) The Court did not invoke the Elections Clause or other ISL principles in its reasoning. In 1932 the Supreme Court ruled in Smiley v. Holm that the U.S. Constitution does not forbid a governor from vetoing a redistricting proposal passed by the state legislature.

The modern revival of interest in ISL at the Supreme Court stems from Bush v. Gore, specifically from a three-Justice concurring opinion in that case written by Chief Justice Rehnquist. In agreeing with the majority's invalidation of the Florida Supreme Court's order of a statewide manual recount of ballots cast in the 2000 presidential election, Rehnquist argued that the Court's holding was further supported by the fact that the Florida Supreme Court's ruling significantly departed from the statutory text of Florida's election code – a violation of the Elections Clause. (Note: Bush v. Gore, 531 U.S. 98, 114, 121 S. Ct. 525, 534, 148 L. Ed. 2d 388 (2000))

=== Arizona State Legislature v. Arizona Independent Redistricting Commission ===
In 2015, the Supreme Court expressly rejected the ISL in a 5–4 ruling in Arizona State Legislature v. Arizona Independent Redistricting Commission. (Note: Arizona State Legislature v. Arizona Indep. Redistricting Comm'n, 576 U.S. 787, 826, 135 S. Ct. 2652, 2678, 192 L. Ed. 2d 704 (2015)) In that case, the Court considered the constitutionality of the authority granted to an independent commission to draw congressional districts for the state of Arizona. (Note: Arizona State Legislature, 576 U.S. at 787.) The commission was created by initiative in which the Arizona electorate voted to amend the state constitution to remove the power of congressional redistricting from the state legislature. The Arizona State Legislature filed suit, arguing that reassigning the power to draw congressional maps away from an elected state legislature violated the Elections Clause. (Note: Arizona State Legislature, 576 U.S. at 800.) The Court rejected this argument. In a majority opinion written by Justice Ruth Bader Ginsburg, the Court ruled that the Election's Clause language "the Legislature thereof" can refer either to the legislative authority of a state's representative body or a state citizenry's use of popular initiative (if consistent with the state's constitution). (Note: Arizona State Legislature, 576 U.S. at 819.)

Chief Justice John Roberts dissented in the case, joined by Justices Antonin Scalia, Clarence Thomas, and Samuel Alito. (Note: Arizona State Legislature, 576 U.S. at 824.) The Chief Justice argued that the text, structure, and history of the Constitution required reading the Elections Clause as assigning the duty of regulating federal elections within a state specifically upon that state's elected represented bodies. (Note: Arizona State Legislature, 576 U.S. at 825.) According to the Chief Justice, this interpretation is the only way to make structural sense of the necessity of the Seventeenth Amendment to the U.S. Constitution, which amended the Constitution to require elections of U.S. Senators "by the people" of each state, replacing the former language granting such power to "the Legislature" of each state. In rejecting the majority's reasoning, the Chief Justice commented ironically on the amendment's ratification efforts: "What chumps! Didn't they realize that all they had to do was interpret the constitutional term 'the Legislature' to mean 'the people'?".

=== 2020 presidential election and 2022 midterm elections ===
Heather Cox Richardson speculated that had ISL been law before the 2020 presidential election, Republican state legislatures in states where Biden got the most votes (e.g. Wisconsin, Georgia, and Arizona) would have sent their own slate of electors and re-elected Donald Trump. The Independent State Legislature theory was used to try and overturn the 2020 US presidential election results in Pennsylvania among other states.

Since the 2020 United States presidential election, four conservative justices of the Supreme Court have indicated sympathy for ISL.

In a federal case challenging Wisconsin's absentee voter laws, Justices Brett Kavanaugh and Neil Gorsuch voiced interest in adopting the doctrine. Specifically, Justice Kavanaugh wrote in favor of ISL as derived from the Presidential Electors Clause, writing "The text of Article II means that the clearly expressed intent of the legislature must prevail and that a state court may not depart from the state election code enacted by the legislature." (Note: Democratic Nat'l Comm. v. Wisconsin State Legislature, 141 S. Ct. 28, 34, 208 L. Ed. 2d 247 (2020) (internal quotations omitted)) In another opinion in the same case, Justice Gorsuch (also joined by Justice Kavanaugh) argued that the Elections Clause "provides that state legislatures – not federal judges, not state judges, not state governors, not other state officials – bear primary responsibility for setting election rules." (Note: Democratic Nat'l Comm. v. Wisconsin State Legislature, 141 S. Ct. 28, 29, 208 L. Ed. 2d 247 (2020))

In 2022, Justice Alito, joined by Justices Thomas and Gorsuch, dissented in a denial of an application for a stay of a ruling by the North Carolina Supreme Court. The state supreme court's ruling invalidated the North Carolina General Assembly's adoption of a congressional map for the 2022 U.S. midterm elections and ordered the implementation of a judicially created map, on the grounds that it was an extreme case of gerrymandering in favor of the Republican Party. The dissent maintained that the North Carolina judiciary's actions were worthy of review by the Court, arguing that "[the Elections Clause's] language specifies a particular organ of a state government [for prescribing the rules for congressional elections], and we must take that language seriously." (Note: Moore v. Harper, 142 S. Ct. 1089, 1090 (2022)) The Court agreed to review the case during the 2022–2023 term as Moore v. Harper.

=== Moore v. Harper ===
Moore v. Harper, 600 U.S. 1 (2023), is a decision of the Supreme Court of the United States that rejected the independent state legislature theory (ISL), a theory that asserts state legislatures have sole authority to establish election laws for federal elections within their respective states without judicial review by state courts, without presentment to state governors, and without constraint by state constitutions. The case arose from the redistricting of North Carolina's districts by its legislature after the 2020 United States census, which the state courts found to be too artificial and partisan and an extreme case of gerrymandering in favor of the Republican Party.

In June 2023, the Supreme Court ruled in a 6–3 decision that the Elections Clause does not give state legislatures sole power over elections, rejecting ISL.

== Theory ==
=== Arguments made in favor ===
Michael Morley argues for ISL saying it would give flexibility for legislatures, that election administration should be entirely run by politicians, put more power in state legislatures, and more quickly resolve election disputes. He also cites Article I, Section 4, Clause 1 (The Elections Clause): "The Times, Places and Manner of holding Elections for Senators and Representatives, shall be prescribed in each State by the Legislature thereof; but the Congress may at any time by Law make or alter such Regulations, except as to the Places of chusing [sic] Senators." [emphasis added] and Article II, Section 1, Clause 2: "Each State shall appoint, in such Manner as the Legislature thereof may direct, a Number of Electors, equal to the whole Number of Senators and Representatives to which the State may be entitled in the Congress: but no Senator or Representative, or Person holding an Office of Trust or Profit under the United States, shall be appointed an Elector." [emphasis added] The phrase, "the Legislature thereof" in both the Electors Clause and the Elections Clause is interpreted under ISL to refer specifically to a state's elected representative body, and not any other parts of the state government.

=== Criticisms ===
ISL has come under criticism on originalist and other grounds. Conservative former federal appellate judge J. Michael Luttig argued that there is "absolutely nothing" to support the ISL. American legal scholar Vikram Amar argues that the founders clearly understood state legislatures to be "created and constrained by its state constitution." Other legal scholars consider ISL to be "fatally inconsistent with basic precepts of both federalism and the separation of powers" as well as "an unprecedented, unconstitutional, and potentially chaos-inducing intrusion into state election law."

Practically speaking, ISL would mean that the general public (through ballot initiatives), governors (elected statewide and so not affected by district borders) and state courts would have no role in altering election laws or federal congressional boundaries, even if they violate the state constitution. Adoption of the ISL could create substantial confusion about the validity of a number of state election laws and regulations and even be destabilizing. Experts said it could allow legislatures draw gerrymandered maps and even subvert the next presidential election. Some fear this theory would be a severe, potentially fatal blow to American democracy. Levitsky and Ziblatt argue that it would ensure the country's slide into minority rule. In an amicus brief submitted for Moore v. Harper, a bipartisan group of former public officials and federal judges warned that "a broad view of the so-called independent state legislature theory ... would essentially hand the future of democratic representation in the states to those motivated to entrench political power in a single party."
