= Moore v. Harper =

U.S. Supreme Court decision

- Supreme Court of the United States

Argued December 7, 2022 Decided June 27, 2023
- Full case name: Timothy K. Moore, in His Official Capacity as Speaker of the North Carolina House of Representatives, et al. v. Rebecca Harper, et al.
- Docket no.: 21-1271
- Citations: 600 U.S. 1 (more)
- Argument: Oral argument
- Opinion announcement: Opinion announcement

Holding
- The Federal Elections Clause does not vest exclusive and independent authority in state legislatures to set the rules regarding federal elections, so a state supreme court may review that state's congressional districting plans for compliance with state law.

Court membership
- Chief Justice John Roberts Associate Justices Clarence Thomas · Samuel Alito; Sonia Sotomayor · Elena Kagan; Neil Gorsuch · Brett Kavanaugh; Amy Coney Barrett · Ketanji Brown Jackson

Case opinions
- Majority: Roberts, joined by Sotomayor, Kagan, Kavanaugh, Barrett, Jackson
- Concurrence: Kavanaugh
- Dissent: Thomas, joined by Gorsuch; Alito (Part I)

Laws applied
- U.S. Const. art. I, § 4, cl. 1

Moore v. Harper, 600 U.S. 1 (2023), is a decision of the Supreme Court of the United States that rejected the independent state legislature theory (ISL), a theory that asserts state legislatures have sole authority to establish election laws for federal elections within their respective states without judicial review by state courts, without presentment to state governors, and without constraint by state constitutions. The case arose from the redistricting of North Carolina's districts by its legislature after the 2020 United States census, which the state courts found to be too artificial and partisan and an extreme case of gerrymandering in favor of the Republican Party.

In June 2023, the Supreme Court ruled in a 6–3 decision that the Elections Clause does not give state legislatures sole power over elections, rejecting ISL.

== Background ==
North Carolina's congressional and legislative districts have been subject to protracted litigation during the 2010s and 2020s in both federal and state courts. In the 2019 decision Rucho v. Common Cause, which arose out of North Carolina's district maps, the Supreme Court held that partisan gerrymandering claims are beyond the reach of federal courts, and that asking for judicial intervention would represent an expansion of powers.

Federal courts can still evaluate redistricting maps for racial gerrymandering under both the Fifteenth Amendment and the Voting Rights Act of 1965. In 2017, the North Carolina General Assembly modified state law to direct that the speaker of the North Carolina House of Representatives and the president pro tempore of the North Carolina Senate may intervene in any litigation over the constitutionality of state law. After the 2020 U.S. census, the state gained an additional seat in the U.S. House of Representatives and required redistricting. The census also showed that the state was about 60% white, with African Americans and Hispanics the largest nonwhite groups. The Republican-controlled legislature started drafting new maps that it claimed were in line with a 2019 North Carolina Supreme Court ruling that required that the maps comply with the Voting Rights Act to avoid racial gerrymandering, along with an open and transparent process to the state's voters. Dan Blue, the state senate's Democratic leader, said the resulting maps advantaged the Republican Party in ten districts and the Democrats in four. Multiple lawsuits were filed against the leaders of the North Carolina legislature in November 2021 on claims that the maps were gerrymandered both by race and by party.

Wake County Superior Court upheld the maps in January 2022. Of the partisan gerrymandering, the court wrote that, per Rucho, "Were we as a court to insert ourselves in the manner requested, we would be usurping the political power and prerogatives of an equal branch of government." The court also said the plaintiffs had not shown sufficient evidence that the new maps were racially gerrymandered. On appeal, the North Carolina Supreme Court ruled the maps unconstitutional in a 4–3 decision in February 2022. Under remand to the superior court, the General Assembly attempted to draw new maps to comply with the Supreme Court decision, but these failed to satisfy the judges on the superior court. A special master team of outside experts was assigned to create a new map, which the superior court accepted on February 24, 2022.

On February 25, 2022, the General Assembly sought a stay for the newly drawn maps pending appeal to the U.S. Supreme Court, to allow for review of the Elections Clause issue. It was denied on March 7, 2022, over the dissent of Justices Samuel Alito, Neil Gorsuch, and Clarence Thomas. Justice Brett Kavanaugh concurred, asserting the Purcell principle counseled against intervention so soon before the election.

Throughout the litigation, the General Assembly argued its case based on independent state legislature theory (ISL). This theory is based on language from the Elections Clause in Article I of the U.S. Constitution, which reads:

The Times, Places and Manner of holding Elections for Senators and Representatives, shall be prescribed in each State by the Legislature thereof; but the Congress may at any time by Law make or alter such Regulations, except as to the Places of chusing [sic] Senators.

The theory is based on the reading that Article I implies that only state legislatures may make decisions related to election law and prevents courts or the executive branch from challenging them. This would allow state legislatures to fully control redistricting as well as other voting laws. The Supreme Court and other courts have rejected this theory, including in Smiley v. Holm (1932), ISL proponents point to Bush v. Palm Beach County Canvassing Board (2000) in support of their arguments. Prior to Supreme Court proceedings, it was known that Alito, Thomas, and Gorsuch had spoken in support of ISL, and in the Supreme Court's March 2022 denial of stay, the three dissented, saying they believed the state argued correctly in employing ISL.

== Supreme Court ==
The North Carolina speaker of the House, president pro tempore of the Senate, and other members of the General Assembly subsequently filed a petition for a writ of certiorari. The U.S. Supreme Court granted review on June 30, 2022, to be heard in the 2022–23 term.

Oral arguments were held December 7, 2022. Court observers said it appeared that the three liberal justices (Sonia Sotomayor, Elena Kagan, and Ketanji Brown Jackson), Chief Justice John Roberts, and Justices Kavanaugh and Amy Coney Barrett rejected the ISL theory David H. Thompson propounded. While Roberts looked to overturn the North Carolina Court decision, he sought to do it in a way that did not embrace ISL. Alito, Thomas, and Gorsuch appeared to still embrace ISL.

The Court had agreed to hear the case in June 2022 at the request of North Carolina legislators after the state's Supreme Court, then with a 4–3 Democratic majority, set aside the new redistricting maps. In the November 2022 elections, Republicans gained a 5–2 majority on the state court, and in February 2023 they agreed to reconsider the prior court's ruling; in April 2023, the North Carolina Supreme Court reversed its previous ruling, holding that under the state constitution, the judiciary branch cannot override the districting the state legislature sets out.

Moore v. Harper had the potential to be declared moot due to the change of ruling at the state level, altering the basis of the case at the U.S. Supreme Court. In March 2023, the U.S. Supreme Court asked the involved parties to submit 10-page briefs within days to assess whether the state court's decision to rehear the case rendered the high court's consideration of the case moot, such that Moore might be dismissed. The petitioners wrote in their brief that the case should not be dismissed, while parties on the other side disagreed as to whether the state court's decision rendered the case moot.

=== Decision ===
The Court issued the decision on June 27, 2023. By a 6–3 vote, the Court held that the Elections Clause does not give state legislatures full control of federal elections, affirming the North Carolina Supreme Court's original decision and rejecting ISL. The opinion was authored by Chief Justice John Roberts. He was joined by Elena Kagan, Sonia Sotomayor, Brett Kavanaugh, Amy Coney Barrett, and Ketanji Brown Jackson. Roberts first asserted that despite the North Carolina Supreme Court decision being vacated, their Court still had the remit to consider the underlying question about ISL. He wrote that since there was intent to challenge the new redistricting maps based on the second North Carolina Supreme Court decision, the case had merit for review by the Supreme Court. Of ISL, Roberts wrote, "The Elections Clause does not insulate state legislatures from the ordinary exercise of state judicial review." But he added that this did not mean courts had free rein to become involved in election decisions, writing, "We hold only that state courts may not transgress the ordinary bounds of judicial review such that they arrogate to themselves the power vested in state legislatures to regulate federal elections."

Kavanaugh wrote a concurrence that agreed with Roberts's review of case law on ISL. He wrote, "Federal court review of a state court's interpretation of state law in a federal election case should be deferential, but deference is not abdication."

Justice Clarence Thomas wrote the dissent, which Neil Gorsuch joined, and Samuel Alito joined as to the part concerning mootness. Thomas wrote that the Court should have decided the case was "indisputably moot", adding, "I fear that this framework will have the effect of investing potentially large swaths of state constitutional law with the character of a federal question not amenable to meaningful or principled adjudication by federal courts." Ian Millhiser of Vox noted that Thomas's dissent rejected an "extreme version" of the independent state legislature theory that would prevent governors from vetoing elections bills.

=== Analysis ===
While legal experts agree the decision struck down ISL, there is some debate about language related to the role of federal courts in election disputes. University of California, Los Angeles law professor Richard L. Hasen said the decision's language gave the Supreme Court "the ultimate say over the meaning of state law in the midst of an election dispute", while University of Illinois College of Law dean Vikram Amar said the Court had no intention "to make mischief" in such cases.

== Impact ==
Moore v. Harper has been called one of the highest-profile cases the Supreme Court has taken in recent years, The case had the potential to have significant impact on federal elections and affect efforts to make gerrymandering illegal or remove restrictions on voting. Former federal judge Michael Luttig called it the "single most important case on American democracy—and for American democracy—in the nation's history".

Democracy Docket estimated that at least 28 separate contemporaneous lawsuits in state court systems about congressional district maps would be affected by the outcome of Moore v. Harper.

== See also ==
- Democratic backsliding in the United States
- Arizona State Legislature v. Arizona Independent Redistricting Commission (2015)
- Texas v. Pennsylvania (2020)
- Whole Woman's Health v. Jackson
