= List of United States Supreme Court cases, volume 285 =

Supreme Court of the United States
- Interactive map of Supreme Court of the United States
- 38°53′26″N 77°00′16″W
- Established: March 4, 1789; 236 years ago
- Location: Washington, D.C.
- Coordinates: 38°53′26″N 77°00′16″W
- Composition method: Presidential nomination with Senate confirmation
- Authorised by: Constitution of the United States, Art. III, § 1
- Judge term length: life tenure, subject to impeachment and removal
- Number of positions: 9 (by statute)
- Website: supremecourt.gov

This is a list of cases reported in volume 285 of United States Reports, decided by the Supreme Court of the United States in 1932.

== Justices of the Supreme Court at the time of volume 285 U.S. ==
The Supreme Court is established by Article III, Section 1 of the Constitution of the United States, which says: "The judicial Power of the United States, shall be vested in one supreme Court . . .". The size of the Court is not specified; the Constitution leaves it to Congress to set the number of justices. Under the Judiciary Act of 1789 Congress originally fixed the number of justices at six (one chief justice and five associate justices). Since 1789 Congress has varied the size of the Court from six to seven, nine, ten, and back to nine justices (always including one chief justice).

When the cases in volume 285 were decided the Court comprised the following nine members:

| Portrait | Justice | Office | Home State | Succeeded | Date confirmed by the Senate (Vote) | Tenure on Supreme Court |
|---|---|---|---|---|---|---|
| | Charles Evans Hughes | Chief Justice | New York | William Howard Taft | February 13, 1930 (52–26) | February 24, 1930 – June 30, 1941 (Retired) |
| | Willis Van Devanter | Associate Justice | Wyoming | Edward Douglass White (as Associate Justice) | December 15, 1910 (Acclamation) | January 3, 1911 – June 2, 1937 (Retired) |
| | James Clark McReynolds | Associate Justice | Tennessee | Horace Harmon Lurton | August 29, 1914 (44–6) | October 12, 1914 – January 31, 1941 (Retired) |
| | Louis Brandeis | Associate Justice | Massachusetts | Joseph Rucker Lamar | June 1, 1916 (47–22) | June 5, 1916 – February 13, 1939 (Retired) |
| | George Sutherland | Associate Justice | Utah | John Hessin Clarke | September 5, 1922 (Acclamation) | October 2, 1922 – January 17, 1938 (Retired) |
| | Pierce Butler | Associate Justice | Minnesota | William R. Day | December 21, 1922 (61–8) | January 2, 1923 – November 16, 1939 (Died) |
| | Harlan F. Stone | Associate Justice | New York | Joseph McKenna | February 5, 1925 (71–6) | March 2, 1925 – July 2, 1941 (Continued as chief justice) |
| | Owen Roberts | Associate Justice | Pennsylvania | Edward Terry Sanford | May 20, 1930 (Acclamation) | June 2, 1930 – July 31, 1945 (Resigned) |
| | Benjamin N. Cardozo | Associate Justice | New York | Oliver Wendell Holmes Jr. | February 24, 1932 (Acclamation) | March 14, 1932 – July 9, 1938 (Died) |

== Notable Cases in 285 U.S. ==
=== Crowell v. Benson ===
Crowell v. Benson, 285 U.S. 22 (1932), is a landmark Supreme Court administrative law decision that outlined the adjudicatory authority of administrative agencies under Article III of the Constitution. The Court held that the United States Employees' Compensation Commission satisfied Fifth Amendment Due Process, and the requirements of Article III with its court-like procedures and because it invests the final power of decision in Article III courts.

=== Smiley v. Holm, Secretary of State of Minnesota ===
Smiley v. Holm, Secretary of State of Minnesota, 285 U.S. 355 (1932), involved a governor's power to veto a congressional redistricting proposal passed by a state's legislature. The Supreme Court unanimously held that the U.S. Constitution did not prohibit a state governor from vetoing his or her state's redistricting map.

== Federal court system ==
Under the Judiciary Act of 1789 the federal court structure at the time comprised District Courts, which had general trial jurisdiction; Circuit Courts, which had mixed trial and appellate (from the US District Courts) jurisdiction; and the United States Supreme Court, which had appellate jurisdiction over the federal District and Circuit courts—and for certain issues over state courts. The Supreme Court also had limited original jurisdiction (i.e., in which cases could be filed directly with the Supreme Court without first having been heard by a lower federal or state court). There were one or more federal District Courts and/or Circuit Courts in each state, territory, or other geographical region.

The Judiciary Act of 1891 created the United States Courts of Appeals and reassigned the jurisdiction of most routine appeals from the district and circuit courts to these appellate courts. The Act created nine new courts that were originally known as the "United States Circuit Courts of Appeals." The new courts had jurisdiction over most appeals of lower court decisions. The Supreme Court could review either legal issues that a court of appeals certified or decisions of court of appeals by writ of certiorari. On January 1, 1912, the effective date of the Judicial Code of 1911, the old Circuit Courts were abolished, with their remaining trial court jurisdiction transferred to the U.S. District Courts.

== List of cases in volume 285 U.S. ==
| Case name | Citation | Opinion of the Court | Vote | Concurring opinion or statement | Dissenting opinion or statement | Procedural jurisdiction | Result |
|---|---|---|---|---|---|---|---|
| Burnet, Commissioner of Internal Revenue v. Chicago Portrait Company | 285 U.S. 1 (1932) | Hughes | 9–0 | none | none | certiorari to the United States Court of Appeals for the Seventh Circuit (7th Cir.) | judgment affirmed |
| Crowell v. Benson | 285 U.S. 22 (1932) | Hughes | 6–3 | none | Brandeis (opinion; joined by Stone and Roberts) | certiorari to the United States Court of Appeals for the Fifth Circuit (5th Cir.) | decree affirmed |
| Hurley, Secretary of War v. Kincaid | 285 U.S. 95 (1932) | Brandeis | 9–0 | none | none | certiorari to the United States Court of Appeals for the Fifth Circuit (5th Cir.) | judgment reversed with direction to dismiss the bill without prejudice |
| Packer Corporation v. Utah | 285 U.S. 105 (1932) | Brandeis | 9–0 | none | none | appeal from the Utah Supreme Court (Utah) | judgment affirmed |
| St. Paul Fire and Marine Insurance Company v. Bachmann | 285 U.S. 112 (1932) | Brandeis | 8–1 | none | McReynolds (without opinion) | certiorari to the United States Court of Appeals for the Fourth Circuit (4th Cir.) | judgment reversed |
| Western Distributing Company v. Kansas Public Service Commission | 285 U.S. 119 (1932) | Roberts | 9–0 | none | none | appeal from the United States District Court for the District of Kansas (D. Kan.) | the judgment of the court below was right and it is affirmed |
| Galveston Wharf Company v. Galveston, Harrisburg and San Antonio Railway Company | 285 U.S. 127 (1932) | Hughes | 9–0 | none | none | certiorari to the Texas Supreme Court (Tex.) | judgment affirmed |
| Burnet, Commissioner of Internal Revenue v. Leininger | 285 U.S. 136 (1932) | Hughes | 9–0 | none | none | certiorari to the United States Court of Appeals for the Sixth Circuit (6th Cir.) | decree reversed |
| Atlantic Coast Line Railroad Company v. Temple | 285 U.S. 143 (1932) | Hughes | 9–0 | none | none | certiorari to the South Carolina Supreme Court (S.C.) | judgment reversed, and cause remanded |
| Eastern Air Transport, Inc. v. South Carolina Tax Commission | 285 U.S. 147 (1932) | Hughes | 9–0 | none | none | appeal from the United States District Court for the Eastern District of South Carolina (E.D.S.C.) | decree affirmed |
| Daniel v. Guaranty Trust Company of New York | 285 U.S. 154 (1932) | McReynolds | 9–0 | none | none | certiorari to the United States Court of Appeals for the Eighth Circuit (8th Cir.) | decree affirmed |
| Leach v. Nichols, Former Collector of Internal Revenue | 285 U.S. 165 (1932) | McReynolds | 9–0 | none | none | certiorari to the United States Court of Appeals for the First Circuit (1st Cir.) | judgment affirmed |
| Hartford Accident and Indemnity Company v. Bunn | 285 U.S. 169 (1932) | McReynolds | 9–0 | none | none | appeal from the Mississippi Supreme Court (Miss.) | appeal dismissed |
| Bowers v. Lawyers Mortgage Company | 285 U.S. 182 (1932) | Butler | 9–0 | none | none | certiorari to the United States Court of Appeals for the Second Circuit (2d Cir.) | judgment reversed |
| United States v. Home Title Insurance Company | 285 U.S. 191 (1932) | Butler | 9–0 | none | none | certiorari to the United States Court of Appeals for the Second Circuit (2d Cir.) | judgment affirmed |
| Stevens v. The White City | 285 U.S. 195 (1932) | Butler | 9–0 | none | none | certiorari to the United States Court of Appeals for the Second Circuit (2d Cir.) | judgment affirmed |
| D. Ginsberg and Sons, Inc. v. Popkin | 285 U.S. 204 (1932) | Butler | 9–0 | none | none | certiorari to the United States Court of Appeals for the Second Circuit (2d Cir.) | judgment affirmed |
| Aetna Casualty and Surety Company v. Phoenix National Bank and Trust Company | 285 U.S. 209 (1932) | Stone | 9–0 | none | none | certiorari to the United States Court of Appeals for the Sixth Circuit (6th Cir.) | judgment reversed |
| Lamb v. Cramer | 285 U.S. 217 (1932) | Stone | 9–0 | none | none | certiorari to the United States Court of Appeals for the Fifth Circuit (5th Cir.) | judgment affirmed |
| Lamb v. Schmitt | 285 U.S. 222 (1932) | Stone | 9–0 | none | none | certiorari to the United States Court of Appeals for the Fifth Circuit (5th Cir.) | judgment affirmed |
| Shearer v. Burnet, Commissioner of Internal Revenue | 285 U.S. 228 (1932) | Stone | 9–0 | none | none | certiorari to the Boston Municipal Court (Boston Mun. Ct.) | judgment affirmed |
| Boston and Maine Railroad Company v. Armburg | 285 U.S. 234 (1932) | Stone | 9–0 | none | none | certiorari to the United States Court of Appeals for the Second Circuit (2d Cir.) | judgment affirmed |
| Southern Pacific Company v. United States | 285 U.S. 240 (1932) | Roberts | 9–0 | none | none | certiorari to the United States Court of Claims (Ct. Cl.) | judgment reversed, and cause remanded |
| American Trading Company v. H.E. Heacock Company | 285 U.S. 247 (1932) | Hughes | 8-0[a] | none | none | certiorari to the Supreme Court of the Philippines (Phil.) | judgment affirmed |
| New State Ice Company v. Liebmann | 285 U.S. 262 (1932) | Sutherland | 6-2[a] | none | Brandeis (opinion; joined by Stone) | appeal from the United States Court of Appeals for the Tenth Circuit (10th Cir.) | decree affirmed |
| Heiner, Collector of Internal Revenue v. Donnan | 285 U.S. 312 (1932) | Sutherland | 6-2[a] | none | Stone (opinion; joined by Brandeis) | certified questions from the United States Court of Appeals for the Third Circuit (3d Cir.) | certified questions answered |
| Handy, Collector of Internal Revenue v. Delaware Trust Company | 285 U.S. 352 (1932) | Sutherland | 6-2[a] | none | Brandeis and Stone (without opinions) | certified question from the United States Court of Appeals for the Third Circuit (3d Cir.) | certified question answered |
| Smiley v. Holm, Secretary of State of Minnesota | 285 U.S. 355 (1932) | Hughes | 8-0[a] | none | none | certiorari to the Minnesota Supreme Court (Minn.) | judgment reversed, and cause remanded |
| Koenig v. Flynn, Secretary of State of New York | 285 U.S. 375 (1932) | Hughes | 8-0[a] | none | none | certiorari to the New York Supreme Court (N.Y. Sup. Ct.) | judgment affirmed |
| Carroll v. Becker, Secretary of State of Missouri | 285 U.S. 380 (1932) | Hughes | 8-0[a] | none | none | certiorari to the Missouri Supreme Court (Mo.) | judgment affirmed |
| Claiborne-Annapolis Ferry Company v. United States | 285 U.S. 382 (1932) | McReynolds | 8-0[a] | none | none | appeal from the United States District Court for the District of Columbia (D.D.C.) | decree affirmed |
| Burnet, Commissioner of Internal Revenue v. Coronado Oil and Gas Company | 285 U.S. 393 (1932) | McReynolds | 5–4 | none | Stone (opinion; joined by Brandeis, Roberts, and Cardozo); Brandeis (opinion; joined by Stone and Roberts) | certiorari to the United States Court of Appeals for the District of Columbia (D.C. Cir.) | judgment affirmed |
| Canada Malting Company v. Paterson Steamships, Ltd. | 285 U.S. 413 (1932) | Brandeis | 8-0[a] | none | none | certiorari to the United States Court of Appeals for the Second Circuit (2d Cir.) | judgment affirmed |
| United States v. Limehouse | 285 U.S. 424 (1932) | Brandeis | 7-1[a] | none | McReynolds (without opinion) | appeal from the United States District Court for the Eastern District of South Carolina (E.D.S.C.) | judgment reversed |
| Hagner v. United States | 285 U.S. 427 (1932) | Sutherland | 9–0 | none | none | certiorari to the United States Court of Appeals for the District of Columbia (D.C. Cir.) | judgment affirmed |
| Coombes v. Getz | 285 U.S. 434 (1932) | Sutherland | 6–3 | none | Cardozo (opinion; joined by Brandeis and Stone) | certiorari to the California Supreme Court (Cal.) | decree reversed |
| United States v. Lefkowitz | 285 U.S. 452 (1932) | Butler | 8-0[a] | none | none | certiorari to the United States Court of Appeals for the Second Circuit (2d Cir.) | judgment affirmed |
| Shriver v. Woodbine Savings Bank | 285 U.S. 467 (1932) | Stone | 9–0 | none | none | appeal from the Iowa Supreme Court (Iowa) | judgment affirmed |
| Pacific Company v. Johnson | 285 U.S. 480 (1932) | Stone | 6–3 | none | Sutherland (opinion; with which VanDevanter and Butler concurred) | appeal from the California Supreme Court (Cal.) | judgment affirmed |
| Spencer Kellogg and Sons, Inc. v. Hicks | 285 U.S. 502 (1932) | Roberts | 7-1[a] | Brandeis and Stone (joint short statement) | Sutherland (short statement) | certiorari to the United States Court of Appeals for the Second Circuit (2d Cir.) | decree reversed, and cause remanded |
| Callahan v. United States | 285 U.S. 515 (1932) | Roberts | 9–0 | none | none | certiorari to the United States Court of Appeals for the Third Circuit (3d Cir.) | judgment affirmed |
| United States v. Scharton | 285 U.S. 518 (1932) | Roberts | 9–0 | none | none | appeal from the United States District Court for the District of Massachusetts (D. Mass.) | judgment affirmed |

[a] Cardozo took no part in the case
