= New State Ice Co. v. Liebmann =

- Supreme Court of the United States

Argued February 19, 1932 Decided March 21, 1932
- Full case name: New State Ice Co. v. Liebmann
- Citations: 285 U.S. 262 (more) 52 S. Ct. 371; 76 L. Ed. 747

Case history
- Prior: Complaint dismissed, 42 F.2d 913 (W.D. Okla. 1930); affirmed, 52 F.2d 349 (10th Cir. 1931); cert. granted.

Holding
- Due process prevents a state legislature from arbitrarily creating restrictions on new businesses only on the claim that its markets affected a public use, such as requiring a license to sell ice.

Court membership
- Chief Justice Charles E. Hughes Associate Justices Willis Van Devanter · James C. McReynolds; Louis Brandeis · George Sutherland; Pierce Butler · Harlan F. Stone; Owen Roberts · Benjamin N. Cardozo

Case opinions
- Majority: Sutherland, joined by Hughes, Van Devanter, McReynolds, Butler, Roberts
- Dissent: Brandeis, joined by Stone
- Cardozo took no part in the consideration or decision of the case.

New State Ice Co. v. Liebmann, 285 U.S. 262 (1932), was a decision by the Supreme Court of the United States which struck down an Oklahoma law that required businesses that sold ice to obtain a license.

== Facts ==
The New State Ice Company, which was properly licensed in by the Corporation Commission of Oklahoma, brought suit against Liebmann to prevent him from selling ice in Oklahoma City without a license. At that time, electric refrigerators were expensive; thus, most people used block ice for cooling food.

The lower courts had relied on Frost v. Corporation Commission 278 U.S. 515 (1929) to conclude that a license is not necessary if existing businesses are "sufficient to meet the public needs therein."

== Decision ==
The Supreme Court struck down the requirement that businesses selling ice obtain a license as violating the Due Process clause of the Constitution. The Court distinguished the case from Frost, which was concerned with businesses that grind grain. It found a public interest key to feeding the population that was not comparable to the ice market.

Justice Brandeis dissented from the court's opinion and was joined by Justice Stone:

To stay experimentation in things social and economic is a grave responsibility. Denial of the right to experiment may be fraught with serious consequences to the nation. It is one of the happy incidents of the federal system that a single courageous State may, if its citizens choose, serve as a laboratory; and try novel social and economic experiments without risk to the rest of the country. This Court has the power to prevent an experiment. We may strike down the statute which embodies it on the ground that, in our opinion, the measure is arbitrary, capricious, or unreasonable. We have power to do this, because the due process clause has been held by the Court applicable to matters of substantive law as well as to matters of procedure. But, in the exercise of this high power, we must be ever on our guard lest we erect our prejudices into legal principles. If we would guide by the light of reason, we must let our minds be bold.

== See also ==
- List of United States Supreme Court cases, volume 285
- Laboratories of democracy, a concept in political theory that takes its name from Justice Brandeis' dissent
