= Election administration =

Preparing and implementing elections

Election administration is the process of preparing for and then implementing an election. Elections may be administered in either democracies or autocracies, and some countries or jurisdictions have more experienced and effective election administrations than others. Factors that affect the quality and legitimacy of election administration include the institutional rules of a country and the size of the election jurisdiction, while election administration can in turn determine the legitimacy of the election and shape voters' confidence in election results.

== Definition and scope ==
Election administration is the management of the logistics of elections, particularly large democratic elections. Common challenges in election administration include long lines at polling places, ensuring equitable access to voting, designing ballots so that voters can understand them as well as possible, ensuring that voters are registered where applicable, counting votes, and correcting vote counting errors as they occur.

== Election context ==
How elections are administered varies substantially among democracies. Political institutions can determine the level of centralized control that a federal government exerts over election processes: election administration in the United States is completely decentralized, with thousands of jurisdictions having primary responsibility for administering their own elections, while elections in India are largely controlled by a federal commission. Elections may also be fundamentally more difficult to administer in some jurisdictions than in others; for example, larger jurisdictions may require more sophisticated apparatuses for collecting and counting votes.

Elections do not only take place in democracies, so elections also need to be administered in semi-democracies or even autocracies. For example, elections in rural China have required developing the means to prepare and implement elections. Especially among semi-democratic cases, one country's election administration might be much better than another's. These variations can happen for democratically legitimate reasons like limited democratic experience in the country or poor funding of election administration, or for less legitimate reasons like attempts to limit voter participation or to not count votes correctly.

The Constitution of the United States specifies that each U.S. state sets its own election procedures. The elements of this right were enumerated in Smiley v. Holm (1932), which enabled states "to provide a complete code for congressional elections, not only as to times and places, but in relation to notices, registration, supervision of voting, protection of voters, prevention of electoral fraud and corrupt practices, counting of votes, duties of inspectors and canvassers, and making and publication of election returns." In practice, this means the states have different policies regarding when and how someone may vote. By 2020, most states offered some form of early in-person voting, and all but five states allowed voters to cast a ballot by mail without an excuse. Several states, often called "all-mail" states, automatically send a mail ballot to every active registered voter before each election.

== Study of election administration ==
Election administration is the topic of academic study. An academic journal, the Journal of Election Administration, Research & Practice, is devoted entirely to publishing scholarly papers about election administration, the Election Law Journal: Rules, Politics, and Policy also has substantial coverage of election administration Election administration is also the subject of numerous education programs. Certifications and graduate degrees in election administration are offered in many countries, including India, the United States, and Italy.

The study of election administration is concerned with what features of elections or election administrators make for particularly successful planning and execution of the election. This may for example depend on the technologies used in the election, like the differences in administering elections in which people vote using hand-marked paper ballots compared to using vote-counting machines. Other common topics of study include the legitimacy of the election process, as well as how the administration of an election affects voters' confidence in the legitimacy of elections.

The people who administer elections can also be the topic of study; for example, in the United States, a survey of local election officials tracks the self-reported experiences of local-level election administrators.
