= Crowell v. Benson =

- Supreme Court of the United States

Argued October 20–21, 1931 Decided February 23, 1932
- Full case name: Crowell, Deputy Commissioner v. Benson
- Citations: 285 U.S. 22 (more) 52 S. Ct. 285; 76 L. Ed. 598; 1932 U.S. LEXIS 773

Court membership
- Chief Justice Charles E. Hughes Associate Justices Willis Van Devanter · James C. McReynolds; Louis Brandeis · George Sutherland; Pierce Butler · Harlan F. Stone; Owen Roberts

Case opinions
- Majority: Hughes, joined by Holmes, Devanter, McReynolds, Sutherland, Butler
- Dissent: Brandeis, joined by Stone, Roberts

Crowell v. Benson, 285 U.S. 22 (1932) is the landmark United States Supreme Court administrative law decision that outlined the adjudicatory authority of administrative agencies under Article III of the Constitution. The Court held that the United States Employees' Compensation Commission satisfied Fifth Amendment Due Process and the requirements of Article III with its court-like procedures and because it invests the final power of decision in Article III courts.

== Background ==
The Deputy Commissioner of the United States Employees' Compensation Commission found that Knudsen was injured while in Benson's employ and while performing services on the navigable waters of the United States. He made an award to Knudsen under the Longshoremen's and Harbor Workers' Compensation Act.

Benson brought suit in the District Court to enjoin enforcement of the award. The District Court affirmed the award.

== Decision of the Court ==
Writing for the Court, Chief Justice Hughes reaffirmed the lower court holding.

=== Due process analysis ===
The Court first addressed the plaintiff's argument that the enforcement of the award against him unconstitutionally deprived him of property without due process of law, therefore violating the Fifth Amendment to the United States Constitution. Specifically, Benson argued that the process by which an administrative agency was empowered to make findings of fact was insufficient.

The Court held that the statute did not violate the due process clause because the administrative procedure provided notice, an opportunity to be heard, findings based on record evidence, and judicial review of all questions of law.

=== Separation of powers analysis ===
Next, the Court turned to whether the statute unconstitutionally bestowed judicial power upon a non-judicial authority in violation of the vesting clause of Article III of the United States Constitution, that is, "whether Congress may substitute for constitutional courts, in which the judicial power of the United States is vested, an administrative agency... for the final determination of the facts upon which the enforcement of the constitutional rights of the citizen depend."

==== Public vs. private rights ====
The Court makes a distinction between "cases of private right and those which arise between the Government and persons subject to its authority in connection with the performance of the constitutional functions of the executive or legislative departments." The latter cases "Congress may or may not bring within the cognizance of the [Article III] courts... as it may deem proper," because they involve "public rights." Congress may instead establish so-called "'legislative' courts... to examine and determine various matters... which from their nature do not require judicial determination and yet are susceptible of it."

The Court then determined that Benson's case did not fall within the "public right" categories, because it concerned "the liability of one individual to another under the law as defined." Nonetheless, it was possible for Congress to task an administrative agency with making determinations of fact. By way of analogy, Hughes refers to the common law practice of fact-finding in cases of admiralty law and courts of equity, where reports of "masters and commissioners or assessors" are relied upon to "take and state an account or to find the amount of damages." Likewise, Congress had not exceeded its constitutional authority in establishing an administrative agency to determine the "circumstances, nature, extent and consequences of the injuries".

==== "Jurisdictional" or fundamental facts ====
Finally, the Court addressed whether Congress could establish an agency with the power to determine facts of a "fundamental or 'jurisdictional'" nature, that is, "facts upon which the enforcement of the constitutional rights of the citizen depend." It held that such final determinations could not be left to administrative agencies, because that would leave agency discretion unlimited and "establish a government of a bureaucratic character alien to our system, wherever fundamental rights depend... upon the facts, and finality as to facts becomes in effect finality in law".

Although the statute required the agency to determine whether the injury occurred on navigable waters and that a master-servant relationship existed, the Court construed the statute to allow federal courts to determine the existence of these fundamental facts for themselves upon appeal, and therefore held the statute constitutional.

== Brandeis dissent ==
Justice Brandeis dissented, arguing that findings of fact could be left entirely to administrative agencies, at Congress's discretion. Brandeis argued that "[t]o permit a contest de novo in the district court of an issue tried, or triable, before the deputy commission will . . . gravely hamper the effective administration" of an Act and noted that the purpose of administrative tribunals was to withdraw certain cases from the courts that would be more effectively handled by a special and expert tribunal.

Even with regard to so-called "jurisdictional" facts in determination of constitutional rights, there was nothing in the Constitution requiring de novo review, and the Court should not construe Congress's intention as requiring it given its hindrance upon the Act's "effective administration." If any constitutional restriction on agency determination existed, "it is not because of any prohibition against the diminution of the jurisdiction of the federal district courts as such, but because, under certain circumstances, the constitutional requirement of due process is a requirement of judicial process."

== See also ==
- List of United States Supreme Court cases, volume 285
