= Laboratories of democracy =

Concept in American federalism

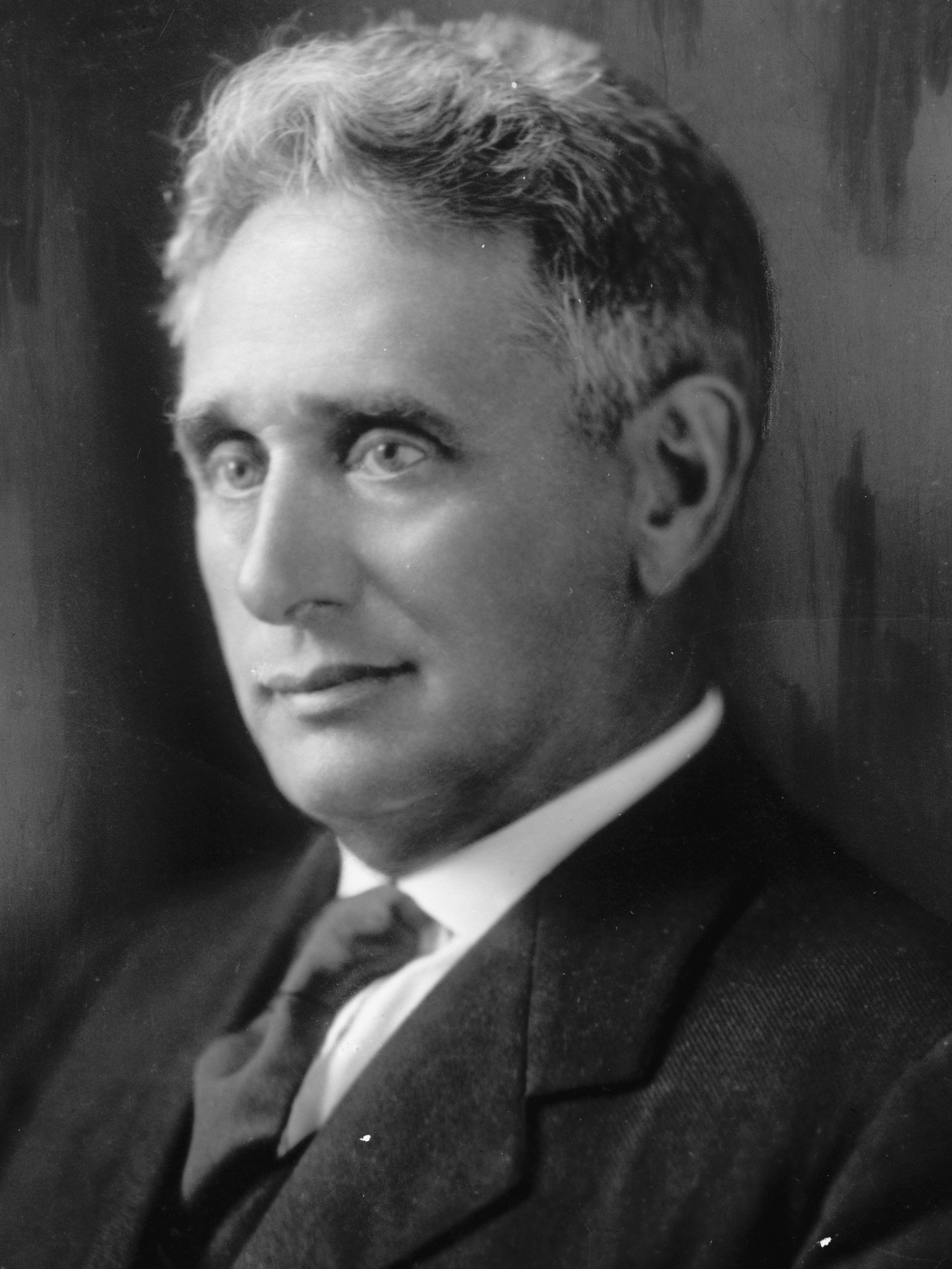
Louis Brandeis praised federalism as allowing states to experiment and make the best laws.

"Laboratories of democracy" is a phrase popularized by U.S. Supreme Court Justice Louis Brandeis in New State Ice Co. v. Liebmann to describe how "a single courageous State may, if its citizens choose, serve as a laboratory; and try novel social and economic experiments without risk to the rest of the country." Brandeis was an associate justice of the Supreme Court of the United States from 1916 to 1939.

This concept explains how within the federal framework, there exists a system of state autonomy where state and local governments act as social laboratories, where laws and policies are created and tested at the state level of the democratic system, in a manner similar (in theory, at least) to the scientific method. An example today would be the legalization of marijuana in Colorado despite the fact that it is illegal federally.

The Tenth Amendment of the United States Constitution provides that "all powers not delegated to the United States by the Constitution, nor prohibited by it to the States, are reserved to the States respectively, or to the people." This is a basis for the laboratories of democracy concept, because the Tenth Amendment assigns most day-to-day governance responsibilities, including general police power, to the state and local governments. Because there are 50 semi-autonomous states, different policies can be enacted and tested at the state level without directly affecting the entire country.

As a result, a diverse patchwork of state-level government practices is created. If any one or more of those policies are successful, they can be expanded to the national level by acts of Congress. For example, the Massachusetts legislature established a health care reform law in 2006 that became the model for the subsequent Affordable Care Act at the national level in 2010, or the various concealed carry state reciprocity agreements that motivated the subsequent proposed federal Concealed Carry Reciprocity Act of 2017.

== See also ==
- Full Faith and Credit Clause
- Wisconsin Idea
