= Arizona State Legislature v. Arizona Independent Redistricting Commission =

- Supreme Court of the United States

Argued March 2, 2015 Decided June 29, 2015
- Full case name: Arizona State Legislature v. Arizona Independent Redistricting Commission, et al.
- Docket no.: 13-1314
- Citations: 576 U.S. 787 (more) 135 S. Ct. 2652; 192 L. Ed. 2d 704
- Opinion announcement: Opinion announcement

Case history
- Prior: 997 F. Supp. 2d 1047 (D. Ariz. 2014)

Holding
- (1) Petitioners have standing; (2) The Elections Clause of the United States Constitution and 2 U.S.C. §2a(c) permit Arizona’s use of a commission to adopt congressional districts.

Court membership
- Chief Justice John Roberts Associate Justices Antonin Scalia · Anthony Kennedy; Clarence Thomas · Ruth Bader Ginsburg; Stephen Breyer · Samuel Alito; Sonia Sotomayor · Elena Kagan

Case opinions
- Majority: Ginsburg, joined by Kennedy, Breyer, Sotomayor, Kagan
- Dissent: Roberts, joined by Scalia, Thomas, Alito
- Dissent: Scalia, joined by Thomas
- Dissent: Thomas, joined by Scalia

Laws applied
- U.S. Const. art. I, § 4, cl. 1; 2 U.S.C. § 2a(c)

Arizona State Legislature v. Arizona Independent Redistricting Commission, 576 U.S. 787 (2015), was a United States Supreme Court case where the Court upheld the right of Arizona voters to remove the authority to draw election districts from the Arizona State Legislature and vest it in an independent redistricting commission. In doing so, the Court expressly rejected a nascent version of the independent state legislature theory.

== Background ==
The Arizona Constitution (Art. IV, pt. 1, §1) lets voters adopt laws and constitutional amendments by ballot initiative. Arizona voters adopted Proposition 106 in 2000 to address the problem of gerrymandering by creating the Arizona Independent Redistricting Commission (AIRC). The Arizona Legislature sued in 2012, arguing that the creation of the AIRC violated the Elections Clause of the U. S. Constitution, which says “The Times, Places and Manner of holding Elections for Senators and Representatives shall be prescribed in each State by the Legislature thereof; but the Congress may at any time by Law make or alter such Regulations.”

The United States District Court for the District of Arizona, dividing two to one, rejected the Legislature's complaint, finding that prior Supreme Court decisions “demonstrate that the word ‘Legislature’ in the Elections Clause refers to the legislative process used in [a] state, determined by that state's own constitution and laws,” and that the lawmaking power in Arizona “plainly includes the power to enact laws through initiative”.

== Opinion ==
Justice Ruth Bader Ginsburg delivered the opinion of the Court, in which Justices Anthony Kennedy, Stephen Breyer, Sonia Sotomayor, and Elena Kagan joined. The Court affirmed the District Court's ruling, holding that "[r]edistricting is a legislative function to be performed in accordance with the State’s prescriptions for lawmaking, which may include the referendum, Ohio ex rel. Davis v. Hildebrant, 241 U.S. 565, 567, and the Governor’s veto, Smiley v. Holm, 285 U. S. 355, 369. While exercise of the initiative was not at issue in this Court’s prior decisions, there is no constitutional barrier to a State’s empowerment of its people by embracing that form of lawmaking."

The court also noted that in 1911, Congress amended section 2a(c) of Title Two of the United States Code, which provided for federal redistricting if states fail to act. Recognizing "that States had supplemented the representative legislature mode of lawmaking with a direct lawmaking role for the people," Congress "replaced the reference to redistricting by the state 'legislature' with a reference to redistricting of a State 'in the manner provided by the laws thereof.'"

In support of its holding, the court cited passages from the Arizona Constitution which read "[a]ny law which may be enacted by the Legislature under this Constitution may be enacted by the people under the Initiative"(A.Z. Const. Art. XXII, §14). The majority also reviewed several dictionaries from the approximate time of the framing of the US Constitution. Instead of a narrow definition of "legislature" meaning a state's senators and representatives these dictionaries defined "legislature" broadly, as "the power that makes laws".

=== Dissents ===
Chief Justice John Roberts filed a dissenting opinion, joined by Justices Antonin Scalia, Clarence Thomas, and Samuel Alito. Scalia and Thomas each wrote additional dissents which the other joined. Roberts concluded that the term “the Legislature” in the Elections Clause unambiguously refers to a representative body as "confirmed by other provisions of the Constitution that use the same term in the same way. When seeking to discern the meaning of a word in the Constitution, there is no better dictionary than the rest of the Constitution itself."

Justice Scalia explained at length why he would not have granted standing in this case, then added "[n]ormally, having arrived at that conclusion, I would express no opinion on the merits unless my vote was necessary to enable the Court to produce a judgment. In the present case, however, the majority’s resolution of the merits question ('legislature' means 'the people') is so outrageously wrong, so utterly devoid of textual or historic support, so flatly in contradiction of prior Supreme Court cases, so obviously the willful product of hostility to districting by state legislatures, that I cannot avoid adding my vote to the devastating dissent of the Chief Justice."

Justice Thomas contrasted the court's support for direct democracy in this case with the overturning of many state voter referendums opposing same sex marriage in Obergefell v. Hodges, decided days earlier.

== Impact ==
The case has formed the basis of action by the Supreme Court in at least one other case, Hickenlooper v. Kerr.

Hickenlooper was a petition for certiorari brought by John Hickenlooper in his capacity as governor of Colorado, as part of a long-running litigation over the Taxpayer Bill of Rights. On June 30, 2015, the Court issued a grant, vacate, remand order in the case, in which it granted the petition, vacated the decision below by the Tenth Circuit, and remanded it to the lower court for reconsideration in light of Arizona State Legislature v. Arizona Independent Redistricting Commission.

== See also ==
- List of United States Supreme Court cases, volume 576
- Moore v. Harper
