= Smiley v. Holm =

- Supreme Court of the United States

Argued March 16–17, 1932 Decided April 11, 1932
- Full case name: W. Yale Smiley v. Holm, as Secretary of State of Minnesota
- Citations: 285 U.S. 355 (more)

Holding
- The U.S. Constitution does not forbid a governor from vetoing a redistricting proposal passed by the state legislature. Minnesota Supreme Court decision reversed.

Court membership
- Chief Justice Charles E. Hughes Associate Justices Willis Van Devanter · James C. McReynolds; Louis Brandeis · George Sutherland; Pierce Butler · Harlan F. Stone; Owen Roberts · Benjamin N. Cardozo

Case opinion
- Majority: Hughes, joined by unanimous
- Cardozo took no part in the consideration or decision of the case.

Laws applied
- U.S. Const. art. I, § 4, cl. 1

Smiley v. Holm, 285 U.S. 355 (1932), was a decision of the Supreme Court of the United States involving a governor's power to veto a congressional redistricting proposal passed by a state's legislature. In an opinion by Chief Justice Charles Evans Hughes, the Court unanimously held that the U.S. Constitution did not prohibit Minnesota's governor from vetoing that state's redistricting map.

== Background ==
The U.S. Constitution states that seats in the House of Representatives "shall be apportioned among the several States which may be included within this Union, according to their respective Numbers....The Times, Places, and Manner of holding Elections for Senators and Representatives, shall be prescribed in each State by the Legislature thereof; but the Congress may at any time by Law make or alter such regulations...". After each decennial census, House seats are reapportioned to take account of changes in the states' populations: states that have grown quickly may gain seats, while those that have not may lose them. Each state then may redraw the boundaries of its congressional districts. Politicians often engage in gerrymandering, the process of drawing district lines in a way that benefits one's party electorally.

In the state of Minnesota, the Republican Party had long enjoyed political dominance. But economic changes in the early twentieth century resulted in increasing dissatisfaction with Republicans, leading to the formation of the Minnesota Farmer–Labor Party, which included advocates for farmers and members of the organized labor movement. The Farmer–Labor Party slowly gained electoral support throughout the 1920s, but Republicans retained their strong control over the state's government and congressional delegation. In the 1930 gubernatorial election, voters for the first time sent a member of the Farmer–Labor Party – Floyd B. Olson – to the governor's mansion, although Republicans continued to control the state legislature. Consequently, partisan conflict between Olson and the Republican legislature resulted during the 1931 legislative session, including with regard to redistricting.

As a result of the 1930 United States census, Minnesota's representation in Congress decreased from ten seats to nine. The Republican-controlled legislature, aiming to ensure that Republicans retained their seats in the House despite growing Farmer–Labor support, passed a heavily gerrymandered map. They expected that Olson would support some sort of compromise because a failure to pass any map would result in at-large elections, an outcome that they predicted Olson would wish to avoid. Yet Olson nonetheless vetoed the bill, believing that the Republicans' intransigence would benefit his party at the polls even if at-large elections occurred. In response, Republicans suggested that the governor's veto was meaningless: Senator A.J. Rockne stated that "[t]he Federal Constitution does not require that the redistricting should be done through any other source than by the Legislature and does not provide that the Governor have anything to do with the matter." The state House of Representatives passed a resolution ordering Mike Holm, the Republican Secretary of State, to record the law as having been duly passed, the governor's veto notwithstanding. Holm complied and began accepting applications from candidates who wished to run in the newly drawn districts. W. Yale Smiley, a Minneapolis attorney, sued Holm, arguing that the redistricting plan was unlawful because it had been vetoed by the governor. Both a state district court and the Minnesota Supreme Court rejected his arguments, holding that under the Constitution, the legislature alone had power over redistricting. Smiley appealed to the U.S. Supreme Court.

== Decision ==
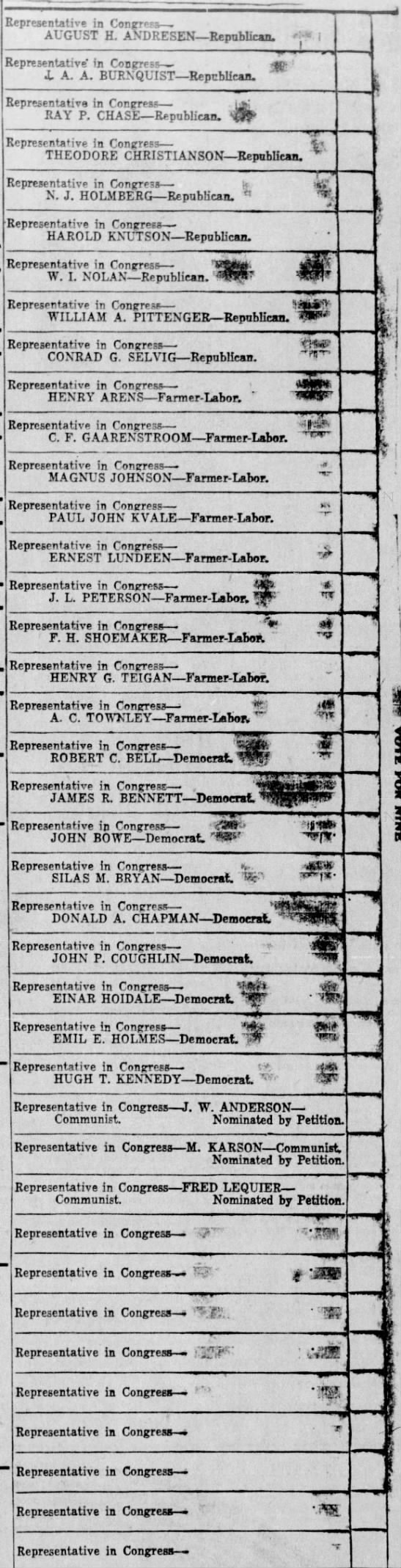
Due to the Smiley decision, Minnesota's 1932 congressional elections were held at large. This sample ballot shows the thirty different candidates presented to voters in the general election.

By a unanimous vote of 8 to 0 (Justice Benjamin Cardozo had recused himself), the Supreme Court reversed the Minnesota Supreme Court's decision. Writing for the Court, Chief Justice Charles Evans Hughes concluded that the phrase "legislature" in Article I, Section 4 of the Constitution referred to the state's general lawmaking power rather than to the state's legislative assembly itself. He distinguished the ratification process for constitutional amendments (a context in which the governor cannot veto the work of the legislature) from congressional redistricting: he argued that redistricting, unlike ratification, was an example of lawmaking and thus was subject to the ordinary legislative procedures prescribed in the state constitution. He reasoned that although Congress had the constitutional authority to displace state redistricting procedures, it had not exercised that power in the context of the gubernatorial veto; consequently, Minnesota's ordinary procedures for passing legislation, including the gubernatorial veto, remained in place. The Court declined to rule on a separate question about whether the Apportionment Act of 1911 remained in force; that issue was later addressed in Wood v. Broom (1932). Hughes held that since no redistricting plan had been validly enacted, Minnesota was obligated to conduct its upcoming congressional elections at large.

In the at-large 1932 House elections, eighty-eight candidates filed to run; the ballot for the general election contained thirty candidates: nine from each of the three major parties plus three Communists who had been nominated by petition. All but two of the incumbent congressmen were ousted; the Farmer-Labor Party took five of the nine seats while the Republican delegation was reduced from nine congressmen to three.

== Subsequent developments ==
In Koenig v. Flynn and Carroll v. Becker, two similar 1932 cases arising from gubernatorial vetoes of redistricting plans in New York and Missouri, respectively, the Court relied on Smiley to summarily uphold lower-court decisions striking down maps that had been vetoed and ordering at-large elections. The Court in Colegrove v. Green (1946) referred to the Smiley decision in its ruling on a malapportioned Illinois congressional map: Justices Hugo Black and Wiley Rutledge each cited it to conclude that disputes involving redistricting were justiciable. References to Smiley appeared in both the majority and dissenting opinions in Arizona State Legislature v. Arizona Independent Redistricting Commission (2015), a case asking whether Arizona's independent redistricting commission violated Article I, Section 4. Smiley was also mentioned in literature written about Moore v. Harper (2023), as well as during oral argument.

== See also ==
- Independent state legislature theory
- List of United States Supreme Court cases by the Hughes Court
- List of United States Supreme Court cases, volume 285
