= Presentment =

Legal statement made to an authority

A presentment is the act of presenting to an authority a formal statement of a matter to be dealt with. It can be a formal presentation of a matter such as a complaint, indictment or bill of exchange. In early-medieval England, juries of presentment would hear inquests in order to establish whether someone should be presented for a crime.

In the Church of England, Churchwardens' Presentments are reports to the bishop relating to parishioners' misdemeanors and other things amiss in the parish.
