= List of United States Supreme Court cases, volume 297 =

Supreme Court of the United States
- Interactive map of Supreme Court of the United States
- 38°53′26″N 77°00′16″W
- Established: March 4, 1789; 236 years ago
- Location: Washington, D.C.
- Coordinates: 38°53′26″N 77°00′16″W
- Composition method: Presidential nomination with Senate confirmation
- Authorised by: Constitution of the United States, Art. III, § 1
- Judge term length: life tenure, subject to impeachment and removal
- Number of positions: 9 (by statute)
- Website: supremecourt.gov

This is a list of cases reported in volume 297 of United States Reports, decided by the Supreme Court of the United States in 1936.

== Justices of the Supreme Court at the time of volume 297 U.S. ==
The Supreme Court is established by Article III, Section 1 of the Constitution of the United States, which says: "The judicial Power of the United States, shall be vested in one supreme Court . . .". The size of the Court is not specified; the Constitution leaves it to Congress to set the number of justices. Under the Judiciary Act of 1789 Congress originally fixed the number of justices at six (one chief justice and five associate justices). Since 1789 Congress has varied the size of the Court from six to seven, nine, ten, and back to nine justices (always including one chief justice).

When the cases in volume 297 were decided the Court comprised the following nine members:

Portrait	Justice	Office	Home State	Succeeded	Date confirmed by the Senate (Vote)	Tenure on Supreme Court
	Charles Evans Hughes	Chief Justice	New York	William Howard Taft	February 13, 1930 (52–26)	February 24, 1930 – June 30, 1941 (Retired)
	Willis Van Devanter	Associate Justice	Wyoming	Edward Douglass White (as Associate Justice)	December 15, 1910 (Acclamation)	January 3, 1911 – June 2, 1937 (Retired)
	James Clark McReynolds	Associate Justice	Tennessee	Horace Harmon Lurton	August 29, 1914 (44–6)	October 12, 1914 – January 31, 1941 (Retired)
	Louis Brandeis	Associate Justice	Massachusetts	Joseph Rucker Lamar	June 1, 1916 (47–22)	June 5, 1916 – February 13, 1939 (Retired)
	George Sutherland	Associate Justice	Utah	John Hessin Clarke	September 5, 1922 (Acclamation)	October 2, 1922 – January 17, 1938 (Retired)
	Pierce Butler	Associate Justice	Minnesota	William R. Day	December 21, 1922 (61–8)	January 2, 1923 – November 16, 1939 (Died)
	Harlan F. Stone	Associate Justice	New York	Joseph McKenna	February 5, 1925 (71–6)	March 2, 1925 – July 2, 1941 (Continued as chief justice)
	Owen Roberts	Associate Justice	Pennsylvania	Edward Terry Sanford	May 20, 1930 (Acclamation)	June 2, 1930 – July 31, 1945 (Resigned)
	Benjamin N. Cardozo	Associate Justice	New York	Oliver Wendell Holmes Jr.	February 24, 1932 (Acclamation)	March 14, 1932 – July 9, 1938 (Died)

== Notable Cases in 297 U.S. ==
=== United States v. Butler ===
In United States v. Butler, 297 U.S. 1 (1936), the Supreme Court held that the U.S. Congress has not only the power to lay taxes to the level necessary to carry out its other powers enumerated in Article I of the U.S. Constitution but also a broad authority to tax and spend for the "general welfare" of the United States. The decision itself concerned whether the processing taxes instituted by the 1933 Agricultural Adjustment Act were constitutional.

=== Brown v. Mississippi ===
In Brown v. Mississippi, 297 U.S. 278 (1936), the Supreme Court ruled that a defendant's involuntary confession that is extracted by the use of force on the part of law enforcement cannot be entered as evidence and violates the Due Process Clause of the Fourteenth Amendment. In a unanimous decision, the Court reversed the convictions of the African-American defendants. The Court held that a defendant's confession extracted by police torture cannot be entered as evidence, and violates the Due Process Clause of the Fourteenth Amendment. The prosecutor at the trial level, John Stennis, was not hurt politically by his prosecutions based on torture-extracted confessions; to the contrary, the voters of Mississippi elected him to office thirteen times, and he never lost an election.

=== Ashwander v. Tennessee Valley Authority ===
Ashwander v. Tennessee Valley Authority, 297 U.S. 288 (1936), is a Supreme Court case that provided the first elaboration of the doctrine of "Constitutional avoidance".

== Federal court system ==
Under the Judiciary Act of 1789 the federal court structure at the time comprised District Courts, which had general trial jurisdiction; Circuit Courts, which had mixed trial and appellate (from the US District Courts) jurisdiction; and the United States Supreme Court, which had appellate jurisdiction over the federal District and Circuit courts—and for certain issues over state courts. The Supreme Court also had limited original jurisdiction (i.e., in which cases could be filed directly with the Supreme Court without first having been heard by a lower federal or state court). There were one or more federal District Courts and/or Circuit Courts in each state, territory, or other geographical region.

The Judiciary Act of 1891 created the United States Courts of Appeals and reassigned the jurisdiction of most routine appeals from the district and circuit courts to these appellate courts. The Act created nine new courts that were originally known as the "United States Circuit Courts of Appeals." The new courts had jurisdiction over most appeals of lower court decisions. The Supreme Court could review either legal issues that a court of appeals certified or decisions of court of appeals by writ of certiorari. On January 1, 1912, the effective date of the Judicial Code of 1911, the old Circuit Courts were abolished, with their remaining trial court jurisdiction transferred to the U.S. District Courts.

== List of cases in volume 297 U.S. ==
Case name	Citation	Opinion of the Court	Vote	Concurring opinion or statement	Dissenting opinion or statement	Procedural jurisdiction	Result
United States v. Butler	297 U.S. 1 (1936)	Roberts	6–3	none	Stone (opinion; joined by Brandeis and Cardozo)	certiorari to the United States Court of Appeals for the First Circuit (1st Cir.)	judgment affirmed
United States v. Safety Car Heating and Lighting Company	297 U.S. 88 (1936)	Cardozo	6–3	none	Sutherland, Butler, and Roberts (joint short statement)	certiorari to the United States Court of Appeals for the Third Circuit (3d Cir.)	judgments reversed
Moor v. Texas and New Orleans Railroad Company	297 U.S. 101 (1936)	per curiam	9–0	none	none	certiorari to the United States Court of Appeals for the Fifth Circuit (5th Cir.)	writ of certiorari dismissed as improvidently granted
Helvering, Commissioner of Internal Revenue v. Salvage	297 U.S. 106 (1936)	McReynolds	9–0	none	none	certiorari to the United States Court of Appeals for the Second Circuit (2d Cir.)	judgment affirmed, and cause remanded
Rickert Rice Mills, Inc. v. Fontenot	297 U.S. 110 (1936)	Roberts	9–0	none	none	certiorari to the United States Court of Appeals for the Fifth Circuit (5th Cir.)	decree vacated
Van der Weyde v. Ocean Transport Company, Ltd.	297 U.S. 114 (1936)	Hughes	9–0	none	none	certiorari to the United States Court of Appeals for the Ninth Circuit (9th Cir.)	decree reversed, and cause remanded
Violet Trapping Company, Inc. v. Grace	297 U.S. 119 (1936)	per curiam	9–0	none	none	appeal from the Louisiana Supreme Court (La.)	judgment affirmed
Tyson v. United States	297 U.S. 121 (1936)	McReynolds	9–0	none	none	certiorari to the United States Court of Appeals for the Fourth Circuit (4th Cir.)	judgment affirmed
Gooch v. United States	297 U.S. 124 (1936)	McReynolds	9–0	none	none	certified questions from the United States Court of Appeals for the Tenth Circuit (10th Cir.)	certified questions answered
Manhattan General Equipment Company v. Commissioner of Internal Revenue	297 U.S. 129 (1936)	Sutherland	9–0	none	none	certiorari to the United States Court of Appeals for the Second Circuit (2d Cir.)	judgment affirmed
Great Northern Railroad Company v. Weeks	297 U.S. 135 (1936)	Butler	6–3	none	Stone (opinion; joined by Brandeis and Cardozo)	certiorari to the United States Court of Appeals for the Eighth Circuit (8th Cir.)	judgment reversed
United States v. Atkinson	297 U.S. 157 (1936)	Stone	9–0	none	none	certiorari to the United States Court of Appeals for the Fifth Circuit (5th Cir.)	judgment affirmed
Meyer v. Kenmore Granville Hotel Company	297 U.S. 160 (1936)	Stone	8-0[a]	none	none	certiorari to the United States Court of Appeals for the Seventh Circuit (7th Cir.)	judgment affirmed
Dismuke v. United States	297 U.S. 167 (1936)	Stone	9–0	none	none	certiorari to the United States Court of Appeals for the Fifth Circuit (5th Cir.)	judgment affirmed
United States v. California	297 U.S. 175 (1936)	Stone	9–0	none	none	certiorari to the United States Court of Appeals for the Ninth Circuit (9th Cir.)	judgment reversed
Treigle v. Acme Homestead Association	297 U.S. 189 (1936)	Roberts	9–0	none	none	appeal from the Louisiana Supreme Court (La.)	judgment reversed
Prudence Company, Inc. v. Fidelity and Deposit Company of Maryland	297 U.S. 198 (1936)	Cardozo	9–0	none	none	certiorari to the United States Court of Appeals for the Second Circuit (2d Cir.)	judgment affirmed as modified
Baltimore National Bank v. State Tax Commission of Maryland	297 U.S. 209 (1936)	Cardozo	9–0	none	none	certiorari to the Maryland Court of Appeals (Md.)	judgment affirmed
Duparquet Huot and Moneuse Company v. Evans	297 U.S. 216 (1936)	Cardozo	8-0[a]	none	none	certiorari to the United States Court of Appeals for the Second Circuit (2d Cir.)	decree affirmed
Tuttle v. Harris	297 U.S. 225 (1936)	Cardozo	8-0[a]	none	none	certiorari to the United States Court of Appeals for the Seventh Circuit (7th Cir.)	decree reversed
Palmer Clay Products Company v. Brown	297 U.S. 227 (1936)	Brandeis	9–0	none	none	certiorari to the Boston Municipal Court (Boston Mun. Ct.)	judgment affirmed
Bronx Brass Foundry, Inc. v. Irving Trust Company	297 U.S. 230 (1936)	Brandeis	9–0	none	none	certiorari to the United States Court of Appeals for the Second Circuit (2d Cir.)	judgment affirmed
Grosjean, Supervisor of Public Accounts of Louisiana v. American Press Company	297 U.S. 233 (1936)	Sutherland	9–0	none	none	appeal from the United States District Court for the Eastern District of Louisiana (E.D. La.)	decree affirmed
Borden's Farm Products Company, Inc. v. Ten Eyck, Commissioner of the Department of Agriculture and Markets of New York	297 U.S. 251 (1936)	Roberts	5–4	none	McReynolds (opinion; joined by VanDevanter, Sutherland, and Butler)	appeal from the United States District Court for the Southern District of New York (S.D.N.Y.)	decree affirmed
Mayflower Farms, Inc. v. Ten Eyck, Commissioner of the Department of Agriculture and Markets of New York	297 U.S. 266 (1936)	Roberts	6–3	none	Cardozo (opinion; joined by Brandeis and Stone)	appeal from the New York Supreme Court (N.Y. Sup. Ct.)	judgment reversed, and cause remanded
Brown v. Mississippi	297 U.S. 278 (1936)	Hughes	9–0	none	none	certiorari to the Mississippi Supreme Court (Miss.)	judgment reversed
Ashwander v. Tennessee Valley Authority	297 U.S. 288 (1936)	Hughes	8–1	Brandeis (opinion; joined by Stone, Roberts, and Cardozo)	McReynolds	certiorari to the United States Court of Appeals for the Fifth Circuit (5th Cir.)	decree affirmed
City of Lincoln v. Ricketts	297 U.S. 373 (1936)	Hughes	9–0	none	none	certiorari to the United States Court of Appeals for the Eighth Circuit (8th Cir.)	decree reversed, and cause remanded
Ingraham v. Hanson	297 U.S. 378 (1936)	per curiam	9–0	none	none	appeal from the Utah Supreme Court (Utah)	judgment affirmed
Gulf Refining Company v. Fox, Tax Commissioner of West Virginia	297 U.S. 381 (1936)	per curiam	9–0	none	none	appeal from the United States District Court for the Southern District of West Virginia (S.D.W. Va.)	judgments affirmed
United States Shipping Board Merchant Fleet Corporation v. Rhodes	297 U.S. 383 (1936)	per curiam	9–0	none	none	certiorari to the United States Court of Appeals for the District of Columbia (D.C. Cir.)	decree affirmed
Wine Railway Appliance Company v. Enterprise Railway Equipment Company	297 U.S. 387 (1936)	McReynolds	9–0	none	none	certiorari to the United States Court of Appeals for the Sixth Circuit (6th Cir.)	judgment reversed
S.R. Company v. Lunsford	297 U.S. 398 (1936)	McReynolds	9–0	none	none	certiorari to the Georgia Court of Appeals (Ga. Ct. App.)	judgment reversed
Pacific Telephone and Telegraph Company v. Tax Commission of Washington	297 U.S. 403 (1936)	Brandeis	9–0	none	none	appeal from the Washington Supreme Court (Wash.)	judgment affirmed
Leahy v. State Treasurer of Oklahoma	297 U.S. 420 (1936)	Brandeis	9–0	none	none	certiorari to the Oklahoma Supreme Court (Okla.)	judgment affirmed
Bayside Fish Flour Company v. Gentry	297 U.S. 422 (1936)	Sutherland	9–0	none	none	appeal from the United States District Court for the Northern District of California (N.D. Cal.)	decree affirmed
Whitfield v. Ohio	297 U.S. 431 (1936)	Sutherland	9–0	VanDevanter, McReynolds, and Stone (without opinions)	none	certiorari to the Ohio Supreme Court (Ohio)	judgment affirmed
Matson Navigation Company v. State Board of Equalization of California	297 U.S. 441 (1936)	Butler	9–0	none	none	appeal from the California Supreme Court (Cal.)	judgment affirmed
Pennsylvania Railroad Company v. Illinois Brick Company	297 U.S. 447 (1936)	Butler	9–0	none	none	certiorari to the Illinois Appellate Court (Ill. App. Ct.)	judgment reversed, and cause remanded
Callaghan v. Reconstruction Finance Corporation	297 U.S. 464 (1936)	Stone	9–0	none	none	certiorari to the United States Court of Appeals for the Second Circuit (2d Cir.)	judgment affirmed
Northwestern Bell Telephone Company v. Nebraska Railway Commission	297 U.S. 471 (1936)	Stone	9–0	none	none	appeal from the Nebraska Supreme Court (Neb.)	judgment affirmed
Noble v. Oklahoma City	297 U.S. 481 (1936)	Roberts	9–0	none	none	certiorari to the Oklahoma Supreme Court (Okla.)	judgment reversed, and cause remanded
Helvering, Commissioner of Internal Revenue v. San Joaquin Fruit and Investment Company	297 U.S. 496 (1936)	Roberts	9–0	none	none	certiorari to the United States Court of Appeals for the Ninth Circuit (9th Cir.)	judgment reversed
Terminal Warehouse Company v. Pennsylvania Railroad Company	297 U.S. 500 (1936)	Cardozo	8-0[b]	McReynolds (without opinion)	none	certiorari to the United States Court of Appeals for the Third Circuit (3d Cir.)	judgment affirmed
Washington v. Oregon	297 U.S. 517 (1936)	Cardozo	9–0	none	none	Original jurisdiction of the Supreme Court of the United States (original)	complaint dismissed
United States v. Rizzo	297 U.S. 530 (1936)	Brandeis	9–0	none	none	certiorari to the United States Court of Appeals for the Third Circuit (3d Cir.)	order reversed
Wright v. Central Kentucky Natural Gas Company	297 U.S. 537 (1936)	per curiam	9–0	none	none	appeal from the Kentucky Court of Appeals (Ky.)	judgment affirmed
Great Western Power Company of California v. Commissioner of Internal Revenue	297 U.S. 543 (1936)	Roberts	9–0	none	none	certiorari to the United States Court of Appeals for the Second Circuit (2d Cir.)	judgment affirmed
Sugar Institute, Inc. v. United States	297 U.S. 553 (1936)	Hughes	7-0[c][d]	none	none	appeal from the United States District Court for the Southern District of New York (S.D.N.Y.)	decree affirmed as modified
McCaughn v. Real Estate Land Title and Trust Company	297 U.S. 606 (1936)	per curiam	9–0	none	none	certiorari to the United States Court of Appeals for the Third Circuit (3d Cir.)	judgment reversed
Chandler v. Peketz	297 U.S. 609 (1936)	per curiam	9–0	none	none	certiorari to the Colorado Supreme Court (Colo.)	judgment reversed, and cause remanded
Commonwealth Trust Company of Pittsburgh v. Bradford	297 U.S. 613 (1936)	McReynolds	9–0	none	none	certiorari to the United States Court of Appeals for the Third Circuit (3d Cir.)	decree affirmed
Georgia Railway and Electric Company v. City of Decatur	297 U.S. 620 (1936)	McReynolds	9–0	none	none	appeal from the Georgia Supreme Court (Ga.)	decree affirmed
Bingaman, Commissioner of Revenue v. Golden Eagle Western Lines, Inc.	297 U.S. 626 (1936)	Sutherland	9–0	none	none	appeal from the United States District Court for the District of New Mexico (D.N.M.)	decree affirmed
Phillips Petroleum Company v. Jenkins	297 U.S. 629 (1936)	Butler	9–0	none	none	appeal from the Arkansas Supreme Court (Ark.)	judgment affirmed
Triplett v. Lowell	297 U.S. 638 (1936)	Stone	9–0	none	none	certiorari to the United States Court of Appeals for the Fourth Circuit (4th Cir.)	decree affirmed; certified question dismissed
Fisher's Blend Station, Inc. v. Tax Commission of Washington	297 U.S. 650 (1936)	Stone	9–0	none	none	appeal from the Washington Supreme Court (Wash.)	judgment affirmed
International Steel and Iron Company v. National Surety Company	297 U.S. 657 (1936)	Roberts	9–0	none	none	appeal from the Tennessee Supreme Court (Tenn.)	judgment reversed, and cause remanded
Asiatic Petroleum Company v. Insular Collector of Customs	297 U.S. 666 (1936)	Roberts	9–0	none	none	certiorari to the Supreme Court of the Philippines (Phil.)	judgment reversed, and cause remanded
New York Life Insurance Company v. Viglas	297 U.S. 672 (1936)	Cardozo	9–0	none	none	certiorari to the United States Court of Appeals for the First Circuit (1st Cir.)	judgment reversed
Norfolk and Western Railroad Company v. North Carolina ex rel. Maxwell, Commissioner of Revenue	297 U.S. 682 (1936)	Cardozo	9–0	none	none	appeal from the North Carolina Supreme Court (N.C.)	judgment affirmed

[a] VanDevanter took no part in the case
[b] Roberts took no part in the case
[c] Sutherland took no part in the case
[d] Stone took no part in the case
