= Collusive lawsuit =

Type of lawsuit

A collusive lawsuit, collusive action or friendly suit is a lawsuit in which the parties to the suit have no actual quarrel with one another, but one sues the other to achieve some result desired by both.

== Advantages ==
The law condones this practice because there are several benefits to settling a lawsuit as opposed to settling a claim outside of a lawsuit. First, if one of the parties to the claim is a minor, they usually cannot settle the claim without the appointment of a guardian ad litem to review and accept the settlement. Once the suit is filed, and the settlement is reviewed by the ad litem who considers the best interest of the child, the parties can then file a joint motion for the court to render judgment, which would then be binding on all parties regardless of their minority. When there is a judgment, the parties also gain the defense of res judicata if sued again on the same topic.

== US federal law ==
Friendly suits are generally not within the jurisdiction of the federal judiciary of the United States, as they do not constitute a true "case or controversy" under Article III of the United States Constitution; see United States v. Johnson. In practice, however, friendly suits are rarely explicitly described as such, and they could easily slip into the federal judicial system through some casual omissions. Moreover, the "case or controversy" requirement of Article III does not bind the judiciaries of the states, which are free to impose their own restrictions on friendly suits (or none at all).

== Examples ==
=== Constitutional law ===
For example, if two people think a law is unconstitutional, one might sue another in order to put the lawsuit before a court which can rule on its constitutionality. Because courts generally reserve jurisdiction for situations in which there is an actual case or controversy – i.e., a real dispute between the parties – where such a suit is suspected, the court may refuse to exercise jurisdiction. For example, the European Court of Justice does not hear preliminary references arising out of hypothetical disputes.

Originally stated in Chicago & Grand Trunk Railway Company v. Wellman (1892), the collusive lawsuit rule is one the seven rules of the constitutional avoidance doctrine established in Ashwander v. Tennessee Valley Authority (1936) that requires that the Supreme Court of the United States to "not [rule] upon the constitutionality of legislation in a friendly, nonadversary, proceeding, declining because to decide such questions 'is legitimate only in the last resort, and as a necessity in the determination of real, earnest and vital controversy between individuals. It never was the thought that, by means of a friendly suit, a party beaten in the legislature could transfer to the courts an inquiry as to the constitutionality of the legislative act.'"

=== Tort fraud ===
Another form of collusive lawsuit involves fraud, where two persons agree to fake an accident, so that the "victim" can sue the other person in order to collect from the other person's insurance. This is a crime, and insurance companies investigate claims to determine that no collusion is involved. Because of the fear of collusive suits, many jurisdictions have, at various times, prohibited spouses from suing one another or prohibited children from suing their parents. Also, many jurisdictions have had guest statutes which make it difficult for a passenger in a non-commercial vehicle to sue the driver if the passenger is injured due to the driver's negligence.

=== At-fault divorce ===
Another example is in divorce, in those jurisdictions where fault remains as a condition before commencement of an action for breach of the marriage contract.

=== Marketing ===
Sham friendly lawsuits can help further false advertising claims. In 2015, pharmaceutical corporation Gilead Sciences was sued by an organization it funded, the AIDS Healthcare Foundation, on the basis of statements of Treatment Action Group, another organization Gilead funded, asserting Gilead's older drug tenofovir disoproxil was "less safe" than its newer counterpart tenofovir alafenamide. The old drug was going off-patent and by 2023, generic versions cost $400 vs. $2,160/month for the new branded version. The active ingredient in both drugs is exactly the same and both versions have virtually identical safety profile, but the friendly lawsuit lead to widespread market perception the old drug was not safe thus creating demand for the new expensive version. The lawsuit also spurred numerous recruitment advertisements from class action lawyers looking for tenofovir disoproxil victims - free false advertising against Gilead's generic competitor.

== See also ==
- Connivance
- Tort reform
- Tortfeasor
