= Last resort rule =

In U.S. constitutional law, the last resort rule is a largely prudential rule which gives a federal court the power to avoid a constitutional issue in some circumstances. It is one the seven rules of the constitutional avoidance doctrine established in Ashwander v. Tennessee Valley Authority (1936) and requires that the Supreme Court of the United States to "not [rule] upon a constitutional question, although properly presented by the record, if there is also present some other ground upon which the case may be disposed of. ... [I]f a case can be decided on either of two grounds, one involving a constitutional question, the other a question of statutory construction or general law, the Court will decide only the latter."

== The First Application ==
Brandeis cited two examples in Ashwander of the "most varied application" of the last resort rule. First, as between two potential grounds, one involving a constitutional question, the other a question of statutory construction or general law, the Court will only decide the latter. To the extent the question involves statutory construction and a plausible interpretation of the statute might obviate the need for constitutional review, this example replicates the seventh rule of the avoidance doctrine.

To illustrate this first application, Brandeis relied primarily on Siler v. Louisville & Nashville Railroad Co. In Siler, a railroad company challenged an order by the Kentucky railroad commission setting maximum rates on commodities transported by rail within the state. The company asserted a takings claim and a Commerce Clause claim under the United States Constitution, as well as state law claims, including a claim that the commission had exceeded its statutory authorization in making such an order. The Supreme Court upheld the lower federal court's order enjoining enforcement of the maximum rate order. The Court indicated, however, that the lower court should have enjoined the rate order on state law grounds, without reaching the federal constitutional grounds.

The Court in Siler confirmed that once the lower court properly determined that it had federal question jurisdiction, the court had the right to decide either all questions or only the state law questions. The Siler Court stated that where a case can be decided without reference to questions arising under the federal Constitution, that course is "usually pursued and is not departed from without important reasons." The Court declared it better to decide the case with regard to the construction of the state statute, and the authority therein given to the commission to make the order in question, rather than to unnecessarily decide the various constitutional questions appearing in the record.

The Siler Court offered no case precedent or doctrinal ground for this policy decision. The discretionary nature of the Court's decision limits the extent to which Siler serves as a primary basis for an absolute last resort rule. After recognizing the lower court's authority to decide the constitutional questions, the Court decided to follow the "usual course" of avoiding such questions if questions of local law would resolve the dispute. This purely prudential formulation of the rule allows courts to dispense with the rule for "important reasons." 1 Although Brandeis prefaced his avoidance doctrine discussion in Ashwander by casting the seven rules as prudential, his formulation of the last resort rule omits this "important reasons" qualification. Thus, an evaluation of the proper scope of the last resort rule requires a determination of whether the qualifying phrase should be employed, or whether the rule should be viewed as an absolute.

"Pullman abstention" represents the most prominent development of this initial application of the last resort rule after Ashwander.

== Brandeis' Second Application of the "Last Resort Rule" ==
The second application Brandeis furnished to demonstrate the last resort rule in Ashwander is the adequate and independent state ground doctrine: "Appeals [to the United States Supreme Court] from the highest court of a state challenging its decision of a question under the Federal Constitution are frequently dismissed because the judgment can be sustained on an independent state ground." When reviewing judgments of state courts, the United States Supreme Court only reviews questions of federal law. The Court will decline to hear a case if an adequate and independent state ground supports the judgment of the state court. The Court reasons that, if a state ground independently supports the judgment, a decision by the Court on federal law grounds will have no effect on the outcome of the case and will amount to an advisory opinion.

== Justifications for the last resort rule ==
The Supreme Court has provided six closely related justifications for the general doctrine of avoiding constitutional questions, noting their grounding in "the unique place and character . . . of judicial review of governmental action for constitutionality."

=== A "Delicate" and "Final" Function ===
The Court has often called judicial review of legislative acts the most important and delicate of its responsibilities. The Court's characterization of judicial review of legislative acts as a "delica[te]" function, "particularly in view of possible consequences for others stemming also from constitutional roots," fundamentally justifies the general avoidance doctrine. An evaluation of the force of this assertion as a justification for avoiding constitutional questions must be linked to evaluation of a second justification offered for the avoidance doctrine, that such review is a "final" function. If the Court renders a final, binding conclusion as to constitutional interpretation each time it speaks on a constitutional issue, the arduous task of amending the Constitution may provide the only counter to the Court's ruling. If, however, the Court acts as more or less an equal participant with other political actors in an ongoing dialogue, those other non-judicial actors can reinterpret and reapply a constitutional provision.

=== The Judiciary's Limitations ===
The avoidance doctrine is also premised on "the inherent limitations of the judicial process, arising especially from its largely negative character and limited resources of enforcement." Additionally, federal courts are vulnerable to the extent their jurisdiction and the work of their judges are subject to control by the other branches. Proponents of avoidance techniques such as the last resort rule believe that the federal judiciary must exercise its powers cautiously to conserve the fragile credibility of the least dangerous branch.

In 1947, evaluating the avoidance doctrine generally, the Supreme Court speculated that to pursue another policy—a policy of "accelerated decision" -- "might have put an end to, or seriously impaired, the distinctively American institution of judicial review." The Court continued: "It is not without significance for the [avoidance] policy's validity that the periods when the power [of judicial review of legislative acts] has been exercised most readily and broadly have been the ones in which this Court and the institution of judicial review had their stormiest experiences."

Ackerman notes that Bickel's countermajoritarian difficulty "recalls the Old Court's long, and ultimately futile, judicial struggle against the New Deal." By using the last resort rule frequently, the Court can live with a constitutional problem and let a solution simmer until widespread acceptance is at hand. Bickel argued that the avoidance doctrine, by allowing the judiciary to render unpopular decisions cautiously, rather than suddenly or haphazardly, preserves judicial credibility and increases public acceptance of Court decisions. The last resort rule allows judges to determine when widespread acceptance is at hand or when more simmering is necessary.

=== The Importance of Constitutional Adjudication ===
Another justification for the avoidance doctrine is the "paramount importance of constitutional adjudication in our system." This justification overlaps to some extent with the delicate and final nature of the constitutional function, discussed above, but it also implicates the role of constitutional rights. The Court sometimes claims that the ability to declare constitutional rights is the most important power the federal judiciary wields. But many individual rights depend on administrative and statutory claims. Justice Antonin Scalia has argued that not "every constitutional claim is ipso facto more worthy, and every statutory claim less worthy, of judicial review." A decision by a court clarifying a statutory or procedural entitlement to relief may have a tremendous effect on a great number of individuals, or on the workings of an administrative agency.

=== Separation of Powers and Respect for Other Branches ===
Two forceful justifications for the avoidance doctrine are "the necessity, if government is to function constitutionally, for each [branch] to keep within its power, including the courts" and "the consideration due to the judgment of other repositories of constitutional power [*1048] concerning the scope of their authority." These justifications are grounded in the separation of powers principle in a constitutional and prudential sense.

=== Federalism ===
In addition to maintaining appropriate power relations among the national branches, the final two justifications for the avoidance doctrine also encompass federalism concerns. Federal courts must defer appropriately to the powers retained by states and their courts. This comity concern implicates two important applications of the last resort rule: Pullman abstention and the adequate and independent state ground doctrine.

==== Pullman Abstention ====
In Railroad Commission of Texas v. Pullman Co., the Texas Railroad Commission issued an order requiring that white Pullman conductors, not black Pullman porters, operate sleeping cars. Several railroad companies, and the intervening Pullman porters, challenged the order as unauthorized by state law and unconstitutional under the Equal Protection, Due Process and Commerce Clauses of the federal Constitution. The Court acknowledged that the "complaint of the Pullman porters undoubtedly tendered a substantial constitutional issue." But the Court avoided the issue by abstaining from decision. Justice Frankfurter wrote:

[The equal protection issue] is more than substantial. It touches a sensitive area of social policy upon which the federal courts ought not to enter unless no alternative to its adjudication is open. Such constitutional adjudication plainly can be avoided if a definitive ruling on the state issue would terminate the controversy.

If the Texas Commission had acted beyond the scope of its authority, the order would be declared invalid under Texas law and no court would need to reach the equal protection issue. Finding the state law unclear, the Court balked at "making a tentative answer" regarding Texas law which the Texas Supreme Court could displace the next day. So the Court handed the politically explosive case to the state court for resolution of state law issues.

Today, if a federal court were presented with a case identical to Pullman and the parties chose not to press the nonconstitutional claims, the court, relying on Zobrest, could reach the equal protection claim. Relying on Siler, the court could decide the state law issues itself; or, alternatively, it could apply Pullman abstention. The Court in Pullman used abstention both to avoid wasting federal resources on a "tentative" state law decision and to avoid the "friction of a premature constitutional adjudication." Abstention furthered harmony between state and federal courts "without the need of rigorous congressional restriction of those powers."

==== The Adequate and Independent State Ground Doctrine ====
In contrast to Pullman abstention, one branch of the adequate and independent state ground doctrine constitutes appropriate application of the last resort rule. The branch dealing with parallel state and federal constitutional provisions has developed in a manner that accords sufficient regard for comity interests while preserving adequate federal court review of constitutional claims. The branch of the doctrine dealing with state procedural foreclosure, however, is more problematic.

The Supreme Court is entitled to review all federal issues, including constitutional issues, on appeal from a final judgment of the highest state courts in order to preserve federal supremacy and advance uniformity in federal law. The Court will refuse to hear a case, however, if an adequate and independent state ground supports the decision. By deferring to state court decisions based on an adequate and independent state ground, the doctrine addresses Brandeis' concern of federal judicial interference with state authority. The doctrine is generally grounded in efforts to avoid advisory opinions and unnecessary constitutional rulings, and the premise of according sufficient respect to the authority of state courts. It applies only when litigation begins in state courts rather than the lower federal courts. This could be because of a desire to proceed in state court or because Congress has limited the jurisdiction of the lower federal courts.

The first branch of the doctrine commonly applies where state and federal constitutional provisions are implicated. The application of the adequate and independent state ground doctrine in cases involving state procedural foreclosure is more troublesome. In such instances, failure to adhere to a state procedural rule is often deemed an adequate basis to avoid Supreme Court review of a federal constitutional claim. State procedural law is thus allowed to frustrate federal constitutional rights because of the decision to respect state procedural rules. The second major criticism of the adequate and independent state ground doctrine is that it contributes to inaccuracy and inconsistency in federal law because state courts' erroneous interpretations of federal law remain on the books as long as the judgment is supported by an adequate and independent state ground. The state court's rulings on federal law, however, arguably amount to no more than dicta because those rulings do not provide the basis for the judgment. The Supreme Court might promote uniformity by addressing constitutional claims even when a judgment is supported by adequate and independent state grounds. The ability of the Court, however, to promote uniformity effectively is questionable in our large nation. In any event, uniformity may not always be desirable. The constitutional dialogue may be advanced by a multiplicity of pronouncements from state and federal courts on federal constitutional law.

Like Pullman abstention, the adequate and independent state ground doctrine may disrupt and delay the vindication of federal rights, and make litigation of federal rights less efficient because of prolonged state proceedings and federal review. These concerns are less troubling in this context because the litigation begins in state court. Either that choice is voluntary and litigants could avoid the adequate and independent state ground doctrine by going to federal court initially, or that initial choice is restricted by congressional jurisdictional allocations and deference to state law in particular areas. Congress can alter such allocations in light of restrictions imposed by the adequate and independent state ground doctrine.

Because the Supreme Court may ultimately review state decisions denying relief under the federal Constitution based on parallel state constitutional grounds, the first branch of the doctrine is a more easily justified application of the last resort rule.
