= Arthur Gooch (criminal) =

American criminal

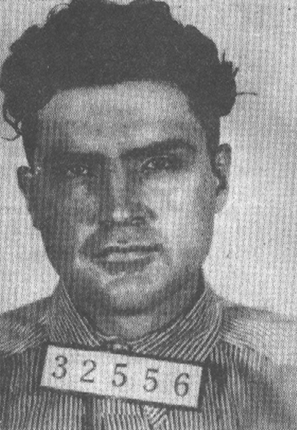
- Born: January 4, 1909; Arkansas, U.S.
- Died: June 19, 1936 (aged 27); Oklahoma State Penitentiary, Oklahoma, U.S.
- Status: Executed by hanging
- Conviction: Kidnapping (2 counts)
- Penalty: Death by hanging

Arthur Gooch (January 4, 1909 – June 19, 1936) was an American criminal. He is the only person executed under the Federal Kidnapping Act who did not kill the victim(s).

== Crime ==
Gooch was the only person sentenced to death and executed by the federal government of the United States for a kidnapping in which the victim(s) were not killed. Gooch and another man, Ambrose Nix, kidnapped police officers R.N. Baker and H.R. Marks in Texas on November 26, 1934, and released them in Oklahoma. Baker was badly injured after being shoved into a glass case, which then broke during the kidnapping. This made the crime a capital offense since the victims had not been released unharmed.

Nix was shot and killed while resisting arrest on December 23, 1934.

Gooch's conviction was upheld by the Supreme Court of the United States in Gooch v. United States (1936).

Although the electric chair was the only method of execution in Oklahoma at this time, Gooch was executed by hanging. The sentence was carried out by Oklahoma's state executioner, Rich Owens. According to the witnesses, Gooch's hanging was botched; Gooch reportedly struggled for 15 minutes before dying. Many blamed Owens for this failure, as this was the only hanging he ever performed and the first hanging in Oklahoma since 1911.

His last words were reported to have been, "It's kind of funny—dying. I think I know what it will be like. I'll be standing there, and all of a sudden everything will be black, then there'll be a light again. There's got to be a light again—there's got to be." Gooch was 27 years old at the time of his execution.

== See also ==
- Capital punishment by the United States federal government
- List of people executed by the United States federal government
