= Gooch v. United States =

- Supreme Court of the United States

Argued January 13, 1936 Decided February 3, 1936
- Full case name: Gooch v. United States
- Docket no.: 559
- Citations: 297 U.S. 124 (more)

Holding
- Kidnapping and transporting a police officer across state lines to avoid arrest violates the Federal Kidnapping Act, even when no ransom or financial reward is sought.

Court membership
- Chief Justice Charles E. Hughes Associate Justices Willis Van Devanter · James C. McReynolds; Louis Brandeis · George Sutherland; Pierce Butler · Harlan F. Stone; Owen Roberts · Benjamin N. Cardozo

Case opinion
- Majority: McReynolds, joined by unanimous

Gooch v. United States, 297 U.S. 124 (1936), was a United States Supreme Court case interpreting the Federal Kidnapping Act. The Court held that kidnapping and transporting a police officer across state lines to avoid arrest violated the statute, even when no ransom or financial reward was sought.

== Background ==
In 1934, Arthur Gooch and his accomplice, Ambrose Nix, escaped from jail in Holdenville, Oklahoma. While fleeing authorities, they kidnapped two police officers, R. N. Baker and H. R. Marks, in Paris, Texas, to prevent Gooch's arrest. The men transported the officers across state lines into Pushmataha County, Oklahoma, where they released them. Baker sustained serious injuries during the kidnapping.

Gooch was convicted under the Federal Kidnapping Act and sentenced to death by hanging. The case reached the Supreme Court of the United States after the United States Court of Appeals for the Tenth Circuit certified two questions concerning the interpretation of the statute.

The central legal question was whether kidnapping someone to avoid arrest constituted holding that person for "ransom or reward or otherwise" under federal law, even when the kidnappers did not seek a monetary ransom.

Gooch was executed by hanging on June 19, 1936. He remains the only person ever executed by the United States federal government for a kidnapping in which no victim was killed.

== Supreme Court decision ==
On February 3, 1936, the Supreme Court unanimously ruled against Gooch in an opinion written by Justice James Clark McReynolds. The Court held that kidnapping a police officer to avoid arrest violated the Federal Kidnapping Act, even though the kidnappers had not demanded a ransom.

Gooch's attorneys argued that the law applied only to kidnappings involving financial gain. They relied on the legal principle of ejusdem generis, which generally limits broad language in a statute to things similar to those specifically listed.

The Court rejected this argument, pointing to a 1934 amendment that added the words "or otherwise" to the statute's original prohibition on kidnapping for "ransom or reward." The justices concluded that Congress intended the law to cover kidnappings for other purposes, including avoiding arrest. The Court reasoned that escaping arrest was itself a benefit to the kidnappers, even if no money was involved.

== Later developments ==
The Supreme Court's interpretation of the Federal Kidnapping Act influenced later federal kidnapping cases. In United States v. Kerns (2021), the United States Court of Appeals for the Sixth Circuit cited Gooch in rejecting a challenge to the statute's wording, while Judge Chad Readler questioned the reasoning of the 1936 decision in a separate concurring opinion.
