= United States v. Johnson (1943) =

- Supreme Court of the United States

Argued May 11–12, 1943 Decided May 24, 1943
- Full case name: United States, et al. v. Johnson
- Citations: 319 U.S. 302 (more) 63 S. Ct. 1075; 87 L. Ed. 1413; 1943 U.S. LEXIS 618

Case history
- Prior: Roach v. Johnson, 48 F. Supp. 833 (N.D. Ind. 1943)

Court membership
- Chief Justice Harlan F. Stone Associate Justices Owen Roberts · Hugo Black; Stanley F. Reed · Felix Frankfurter; William O. Douglas · Frank Murphy; Robert H. Jackson · Wiley B. Rutledge

Case opinion
- Per curiam

United States v. Johnson, 319 U.S. 302 (1943), was a United States Supreme Court case.

== Background ==
The tenant brought suit against the landlord, alleging violation of the Emergency Price Control Act of 1942, and demanding treble damages and reasonable attorney fees. The landlord filed a motion to dismiss, challenging the constitutionality of the Act. The government intervened and filed a brief in support of the constitutionality of the Act. The district court dismissed the tenant's complaint on the grounds that the Act and the promulgation of the regulation under it were unconstitutional because Congress unconstitutionally delegated legislative power.

Before entry of the order dismissing the complaint, the government filed a motion to reopen the case on the ground that it was collusive and did not involve a real case or controversy. The affidavit of the plaintiff, submitted by the Government on its motion to dismiss the suit as collusive, shows without contradiction that he brought the present proceeding in a fictitious name; that it was instituted as a "friendly suit" at appellee's request; that the plaintiff did not employ, pay, or even meet, the attorney who appeared of record in his behalf; that he had no knowledge who paid the $15 filing fee in the district court, but was assured by appellee that as plaintiff he would incur no expense in bringing the suit; that he did not read the complaint which was filed in his name as plaintiff; that in his conferences with the appellee and appellee's attorney of record, nothing was said concerning treble damages and he had no knowledge of the amount of the judgment prayed until he read of it in a local newspaper. Appellee's counter-affidavit did not deny these allegations. It admitted that appellee's attorney had undertaken to procure an attorney to represent the plaintiff and had assured the plaintiff that his presence in court during the trial of the cause would not be necessary. It appears from the district court's opinion that no brief was filed on the plaintiff's behalf in that court.

The Government's motion was denied. The Government appealed to the Supreme Court under § 2 of the Act of August 24, 1937, 50 Stat. 752, 28 U.S.C. § 349a, and assigns as error both the ruling of the district court on the constitutionality of the Act, and its refusal to reopen and dismiss the case as collusive.

== Opinion of the Court ==
The Supreme Court vacated and ordered dismissal of the suit, holding that the suit was collusive because it was not in any real sense adversary. In so holding, the court noted that the tenant had no active participation in the suit, exercised no control in the case, was only nominally represented by counsel, and his counsel was selected by the landlord's counsel.

=== Excerpts ===
- "Even in a litigation where only private rights are involved, the judgment will not be allowed to stand where one of the parties has dominated the conduct of the suit by payment of the fees of both. Gardner v. Goodyear Dental Vulcanite Co., 131 U.S. Appendix, ciii."
- "Here an important public interest is at stake—the validity of an Act of Congress having far-reaching effects [*305] on the public welfare in one of the most critical periods in the history of the country. That interest has been adjudicated in a proceeding in which the plaintiff has had no active participation, over which he has exercised no control, and the expense of which he has not borne. He has been only nominally represented by counsel who was selected by appellee's counsel and whom he has never seen. Such a suit is collusive because it is not in any real sense adversary. It does not assume the "honest and actual antagonistic assertion of rights" to be adjudicated—a safeguard essential to the integrity of the judicial process, and one which we have held to be indispensable to adjudication of constitutional questions by this Court. Chicago & Grand Trunk Ry. Co. v. Wellman, 143 U.S. 339, 345; and see Lord v. Veazie, 8 How. 251; Cleveland v. Chamberlain, 1 Black 419; Bartemeyer v. Iowa, 18 Wall. 129, 134-35; Atherton Mills v. Johnston, 259 U.S. 13, 15. Whenever in the course of litigation such a defect in the proceedings is brought to the court's attention, it may set aside any adjudication thus procured and dismiss the cause without entering judgment on the [**1077] merits. It is the court's duty to do so where, as here, the public interest has been placed at hazard by the amenities of parties to a suit conducted under the domination of only one of them. The district court should have granted the Government's motion to dismiss the suit as collusive. We accordingly vacate the judgment below with instructions to the district court to dismiss the cause on that ground alone. Under the statute, 28 U. S. C. § 401, the Government is liable for costs which may be taxed as in a suit between private litigants; costs in this Court will be taxed against appellee."
