= Constitutional avoidance =

United States judicial doctrine

Constitutional avoidance is a legal doctrine of judicial review in United States constitutional law that dictates that United States federal courts should refuse to rule on a constitutional issue if the case can be resolved without involving constitutionality. In Ashwander v. Tennessee Valley Authority (1936), Justice Louis D. Brandeis established a seven-rule test for the justiciability of controversies presenting constitutional questions:

1. Collusive lawsuit rule: The Court will not [rule] upon the constitutionality of legislation in a friendly, nonadversary, proceeding, declining because to decide such questions "is legitimate only in the last resort, and as a necessity in the determination of real, earnest and vital controversy between individuals. It never was the thought that, by means of a friendly suit, a party beaten in the legislature could transfer to the courts an inquiry as to the constitutionality of the legislative act."
2. Ripeness: The Court will not "anticipate a question of constitutional law in advance of the necessity of deciding it."
3. Minimalism: The Court will not "formulate a rule of constitutional law broader than is required by the precise facts to which it is to be applied."
4. Last resort rule: The Court will not [rule] upon a constitutional question, although properly presented by the record, if there is also present some other ground upon which the case may be disposed of. ... [I]f a case can be decided on either of two grounds, one involving a constitutional question, the other a question of statutory construction or general law, the Court will decide only the latter.
5. Standing; Mootness: The Court will not [rule] upon the validity of a statute upon complaint of one who fails to show that he is injured by its operation.
6. Constitutional estoppel: The Court will not [rule] upon the constitutionality of a statute at the instance of one who has availed himself of its benefits.
7. Constitutional avoidance canon: "When the validity of an act of the Congress is drawn in question, and even if a serious doubt of constitutionality is raised, it is a cardinal principle that this Court will first ascertain whether a construction of the statute is fairly possible by which the question may be avoided."

The Supreme Court has referred to the constitutional avoidance doctrine of "paramount importance of constitutional adjudication in our system." Framed as judicial restraint, this doctrine encourages judges to first address the legality of statutory and regulatory law because legislatures and administrative agencies can easily modify them, as compared to the difficulty of enacting a constitutional amendment.

== History ==
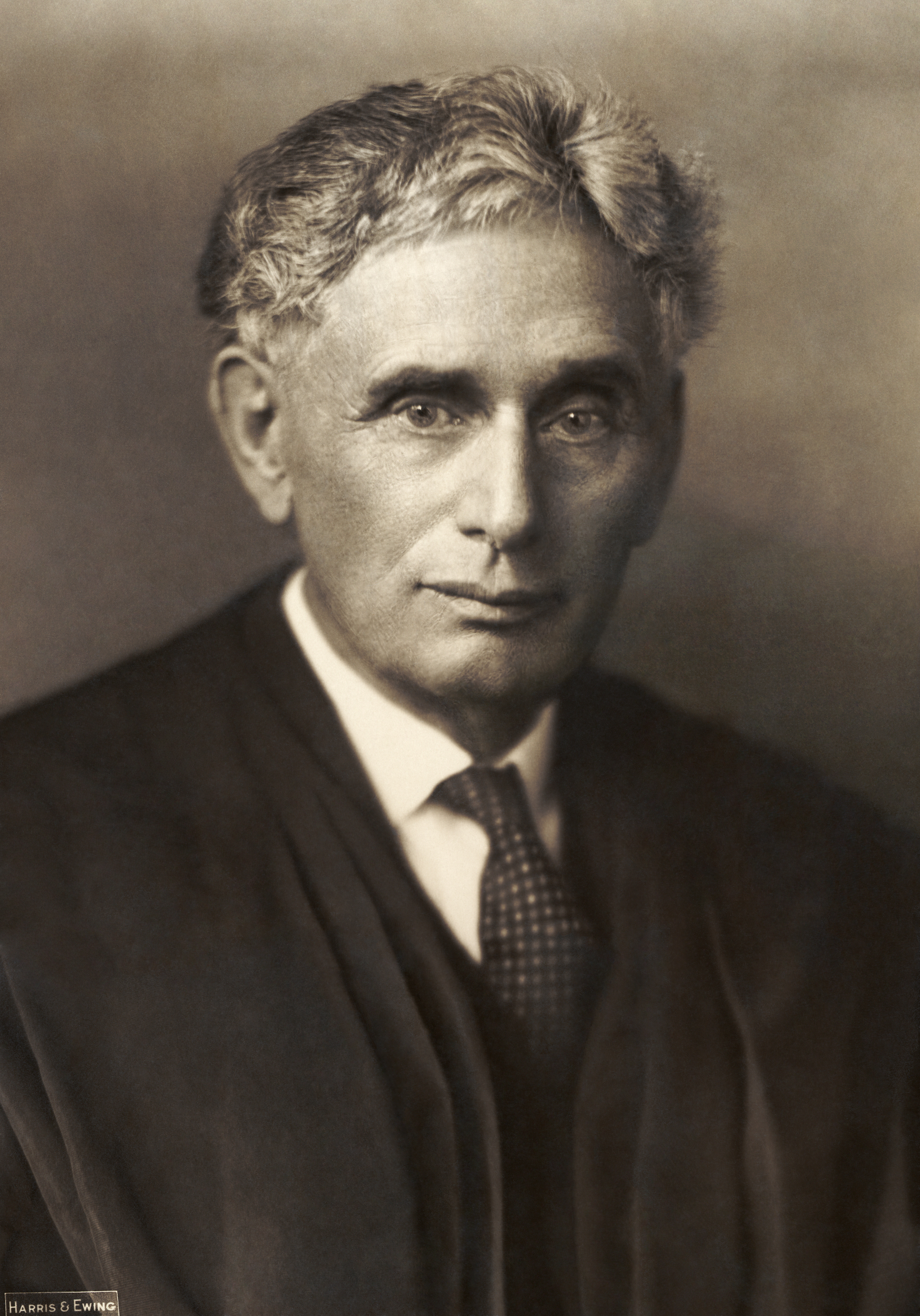
Justice Louis D. Brandeis

While Associate Justice Louis Brandeis's concurring opinion in Ashwander is the primary source of the constitutional avoidance doctrine, Chief Justice John Marshall had espoused the concept in Ex parte Randolph, 20 F. Cas. 242, 254 (C.C.D. Va. 1833) (No. 11,558). Marshall instructed that if such questions "become indispensably necessary to the case," they must be decided, but "if the case may be determined on other points, a just respect for the legislature requires, that the obligation of its laws should not be unnecessarily and wantonly assailed." In Ex parte Randolph, Marshall was circuit riding when he considered a challenge to a congressional act that allowed Treasury agents to issue warrants for military officers who failed to pay and to settle their accounts of public funds. The court concluded that the act did not apply to an officer temporarily acting as the ship's purser because of the death of the regularly-commissioned purser, granting his petition for habeas corpus.

Justice Brandeis's concurring opinion in Ashwander provides the most significant formulation of the avoidance doctrine, but his formulation had no effect on the outcome of the case because the Justice concurred in the plurality opinion, which considered and decided the properly-presented constitutional issues. In Ashwander, Justice Brandeis identified seven components of the avoidance doctrine. The Supreme Court expanded on this concept in Railroad Commission v. Pullman Co. (1941), holding that United States federal courts should abstain from hearing a case in order to allow state courts to decide Constitutional issues that touch on sensitive areas of state social policy.

In the 1979 case NLRB v. Catholic Bishop of Chicago, Justice William J. Brennan Jr. dissented, arguing that if the constitutional issue is not plainly clear in the argument, courts should avoid making the decision based on constitutional questions. In such instances, he argued that courts should decide if a particular interpretation is "fairly possible."

Justice John Paul Stevens called the Ashwander concurrence "one of the most respected opinions ever written by a Member of this Court". Brandeis, a leader of the progressive movement prior to his judicial appointment, offered a broad framing of the avoidance doctrine. The doctrine was adopted heartily by Justice Felix Frankfurter, who was attacked as too "liberal" while he was a Harvard scholar and actively supported the New Deal programs. That tool of judicial restraint espoused by "liberals" was largely inspired by the response of Brandeis and Frankfurter to the conservative "judicial activism" on the Supreme Court in the 1930s, which struck down legislation as infringing on freedom of contract and substantive due process. In recent years, conservative jurists have been more likely to cite doctrines of judicial restraint.

== See also ==
- Ashwander rules
- Principle of avoidance (South Africa), an analogous concept in South African law
