= Brown v. Mississippi =

- Supreme Court of the United States

Argued January 10, 1936 Decided February 17, 1936
- Full case name: Brown, et al. v. State of Mississippi
- Citations: 297 U.S. 278 (more) 56 S. Ct. 461; 80 L. Ed. 682

Case history
- Prior: Brown v. State, 173 Miss. 542, 161 So. 465, 158 So. 339 (1935); cert. granted, 296 U.S. 559 (1935).

Holding
- A confession extracted through police brutality cannot be entered as evidence and violates the Due Process Clause of the Fourteenth Amendment to the Constitution of the United States of America.

Court membership
- Chief Justice Charles E. Hughes Associate Justices Willis Van Devanter · James C. McReynolds; Louis Brandeis · George Sutherland; Pierce Butler · Harlan F. Stone; Owen Roberts · Benjamin N. Cardozo

Case opinion
- Majority: Hughes, joined by unanimous

Laws applied
- U.S. Const. amend. XIV

Brown v. Mississippi, 297 U.S. 278 (1936), was a United States Supreme Court case that ruled that a defendant's involuntary confession that is extracted by the use of force on the part of law enforcement cannot be entered as evidence and violates the Due Process Clause of the Fourteenth Amendment.

== Facts of the case ==
Raymond Stewart, a white planter, was murdered in Kemper County, Mississippi, on March 30, 1934. Three black tenant farmers — Arthur Ellington, Ed Brown, and Henry Shields — were arrested for his murder. At the trial, the prosecution's principal evidence was the defendants' confessions to police officers. During the trial, however, prosecution witnesses freely admitted that the defendants confessed only after being subjected to brutal whippings by the officers:

"... defendants were made to strip and they were laid over chairs and their backs were cut to pieces with a leather strap with buckles on it, and they were likewise made by the said deputy definitely to understand that the whipping would be continued unless and until they confessed, and not only confessed, but confessed in every matter of detail as demanded by those present; and in this manner the defendants confessed the crime, and, as the whippings progressed and were repeated, they changed or adjusted their confession in all particulars of detail so as to conform to the demands of their torturers. When the confessions had been obtained in the exact form and contents as desired by the mob, they left with the parting admonition and warning that, if the defendants changed their story at any time in any respect from that last stated, the perpetrators of the outrage would administer the same or equally effective treatment."

One defendant had also been subjected to being strung up by his neck from a tree in addition to the whippings. The confessions were nevertheless admitted into evidence. The only other evidence against any of the three was fingerprint evidence that linked Brown's fingerprints to the bowl of the lamp found near the body of the victim. All three defendants were convicted of murder by a jury and sentenced to death by hanging. The convictions were affirmed by the Mississippi Supreme Court on appeal. In Chief Justice Virgil Alexis Griffith's dissent, he wrote "the transcript reads more like pages torn from some medieval account than a record made within the confines of a modern civilization."

== Supreme Court ==
Former Mississippi Governor Earl Brewer represented Brown, Ellington, and Shields at the Supreme Court.

In a unanimous decision, the United States Supreme Court reversed the convictions of the defendants. It held that a defendant's confession that was extracted by police violence cannot be entered as evidence and violates the Due Process Clause of the Fourteenth Amendment.

== Aftermath ==
Upon remand from the United States Supreme Court, the three defendants pleaded nolo contendere to manslaughter rather than risk a retrial. Brown, the only defendant with any evidence against him beyond his confession, was sentenced to 10 years in prison. Ellington and Shields were sentenced to 5 years and 3 years in prison, respectively. All three men were given credit for time served.

The prosecutor at the trial level, John C. Stennis, later served 42 years as a United States Senator, including two years as President pro tempore. He ran for office in Mississippi thirteen times and never lost.

== See also ==
- Confession (legal)
- Chambers v. Florida (1940)
- List of criminal competencies
- List of United States Supreme Court cases, volume 297
- Miranda v. Arizona (1966)
- Scottsboro Boys
