= Guest statute =

A guest statute is a term used in the law of torts to describe a statute that makes it significantly more difficult for a passenger in an automobile to recover damages from the driver for injuries received in an accident resulting from ordinary negligence on the part of the driver. Instead, passengers are limited to suits based on gross negligence, recklessness, or intentional misconduct. The statute may also place a cap on the damages to be awarded, or limit damages to compensation for actual physical injuries. The original purpose of the guest statute was both to protect drivers from frivolous litigation and to protect insurance companies from collusive and fraudulent suits (wherein the passenger sues the driver in order to collect from the driver's insurer). For the same reason, some states also passed aviation guest statutes, which limit the liability of non-commercial airplane passengers.

In 1917, the Massachusetts Supreme Judicial Court decided that "unpaid drivers, analogized to gratuitous bailees, should not be held liable to their guests for automobile accidents in the absence of gross negligence." After this, almost 30 states adopted this heightened requirement by statute. Nebraska's guest statute was repealed in 2010 following a court case upholding its constitutionality. Oregon maintains a guest statute applicable to non-paying passengers in aircraft or watercraft limiting claims for injury, death or loss in case of an accident, unless the accident was intentional on the part of the owner or operator or caused by the gross negligence or intoxication of the owner or operator.

== Guest Statutes and Interspousal Tort Suits ==
Guest statutes played a large role in the legal trends surrounding interspousal tort suits for accidents arising from negligent automobile accidents. Judicial decisions regarding spouses' ability to sue one another for tortious acts contained similar policy concerns to those underlying the adoption of guest statutes. Scholars point to the rise of guest statutes and their treatment by courts in the interspousal liability context as evidence that denying spouses the ability to sue each other was not the result of patriarchal restriction, but was truly motivated by worries surrounding insurance fraud.
