= Grosjean v. American Press Co. =

- Supreme Court of the United States

Argued January 13–14, 1936 Decided February 10, 1936
- Full case name: Alice Lee Grosjean, Supervisor of Public Accounts for the State of Louisiana v. American Press Co., et al.
- Citations: 297 U.S. 233 (more) 56 S. Ct. 444; 80 L. Ed. 660; 1936 U.S. LEXIS 524

Case history
- Prior: Am. Press Co. v. Grosjean, 10 F. Supp. 161 (E.D. La. 1935); probable jurisdiction noted, 56 S. Ct. 129 (1935).

Holding
- The Louisiana tax was an unconstitutional violation of the First Amendment.

Court membership
- Chief Justice Charles E. Hughes Associate Justices Willis Van Devanter · James C. McReynolds; Louis Brandeis · George Sutherland; Pierce Butler · Harlan F. Stone; Owen Roberts · Benjamin N. Cardozo

Case opinion
- Majority: Sutherland, joined by unanimous

Laws applied
- U.S. Const. amends. I, XIV

Grosjean v. American Press Co., 297 U.S. 233 (1936), was a decision of the United States Supreme Court over a challenge to a separate sales tax on newspapers with circulation of over 20,000.

== Background ==
U.S. Senator Huey Long received more support in rural areas whereas the larger urban newspapers tended to be more critical of him. In 1934, his political allies levied a 2% gross receipts tax in an attempt to tax newspapers critical of him into submission. Nine publishers representing 13 newspapers impacted by the tax sued in federal court.

== Decision ==
The Supreme Court, in a unanimous decision, found the tax unconstitutional. The decision held that states could charge customary taxes on media but higher taxes ran afoul of the First Amendment. Specifically, the court found the law similar to the British Stamp Act 1712 in that it would suppress free speech through taxation and allowing a similar law would be against the clear Founders' Intent of the Bill of Rights. Justice George Sutherland wrote that "the revolution really began when, in 1765, that government sent stamps for newspaper duties to the American colonies."

The case is often cited because it defined corporations as "persons" for purposes of analysis under the Equal Protection Clause.

The Court stated, "The predominant purpose of the grant of immunity here invoked was to preserve an untrammeled press as a vital source of public information. The newspapers, magazines and other journals of the country, it is safe to say, have shed and continue to shed, more light on the public and business affairs of the nation than any other instrumentality of publicity, and, since informed public opinion is the most potent of all restraints upon misgovernment, the suppression or abridgment of the publicity afforded by a free press cannot be regarded otherwise than with grave concern. The tax here involved is bad not because it takes money from the pockets of the appelles. If that were all, a wholly different question would be presented. It is bad because, in the light of its history and of its present setting, it is seen to be a deliberate and calculated device in the guise of a tax to limit the circulation of information to which the public is entitled in virtue of the constitutional guaranties. A free press stands as one of the great interpreters between the government and the people. To allow it to be fettered is to fetter ourselves."

== See also ==
- List of United States Supreme Court cases, volume 297
