= Confession (law) =

Statement by suspect of a crime

In the law of criminal evidence, a confession is a statement by a suspect in crime which is adverse to that person. Some secondary authorities, such as Black's Law Dictionary, define a confession in more narrow terms, e.g. as "a statement admitting or acknowledging all facts necessary for conviction of a crime", which would be distinct from a mere admission of certain facts that, if true, would still not, by themselves, satisfy all the elements of the offense. The equivalent in civil cases is a statement against interest.

== History ==
This specific form of testimony, involving oneself, has been used as a form of proof in judicial matters, since at least the Inquisition. The value of confessions, however, is discussed, and laws generally request cross-checking them with objective facts and other forms of evidence (exhibits, testimony from witnesses, etc.) in order to evaluate the confession's truth value. Confessions were first developed in the Roman Catholic Church under the Sacrament of Penance, where the confession of a sin is considered to be enough to absolve the penitent. This link between confession and moral guilt has been carried over into various legislative codes, in which a criminal is considered worse if they do not confess to their crimes.

== Reliability ==
=== Conditions ===
Under Japanese law, a confession is admissible as evidence only if there is other independent evidence in support of the confession. However, many miscarriages of justice in Japan are due to police forcing a false confession.

=== Torture ===
On one hand, confessions obtained under torture have often been considered to be not objective enough, since the use of such means may lead to the suspect in confessing anything. However, when the confession reveals secrets only known to the perpetrator (such as the location of the body or murder weapon), the confession is reliable.

On the other hand, even without torture, various cases of averred false confessions demonstrate that, in itself, one person's confession is not a sufficient proof. False memory (including memory biases, etc.) or privileges granted under plea bargaining might lead to such false confessions.

=== Forced confession ===
A forced or coerced confession is a confession obtained from a suspect or a prisoner by means of pressure, torture (including enhanced interrogation techniques) or other forms of duress, whether physical or psychological. Depending on the level of coercion used, a forced confession is not valid in revealing the truth. The person being interrogated may agree to the story presented to him or even make up falsehoods himself in order to satisfy the interrogator and discontinue his suffering. However, despite developments in the 20th century, notably the Universal Declaration of Human Rights, which greatly reduced the legal acceptance of forced confessions, these are still practised and accepted in some jurisdictions. The People's Republic of China has been shown to systematically employ forced televised confession, often in an extrajudicial context, against Chinese dissidents and workers of various human rights group in an attempt to discredit, smear and suppress dissident voices and activism. Scripted confessions, obtained via systematic duress and torture, are broadcast on the state television. Notable victims includes Wang Yu, a female human rights lawyer, and Swedish NGO worker Peter Dahlin, and Gui Minhai, a Chinese-born Swedish book publisher.

== Scientific reliability ==
Confession evidence can be considered, arguably, the best piece of evidence of guilt in the criminal justice system. However, false confessions do occur, therefore there must be some flaws in the interrogation process. In a scientific article "Confession Evidence: Commonsense Myths and Misconceptions" by Saul M. Kassin, five myths in the confession evidence system were identified. These myths are 1) trained interviewers can detect truth and deception; 2) Miranda protects the accused from interrogation; 3) people do not confess to crimes they did not commit; 4) police, prosecutors, judges, and juries can distinguish true and false confessions; and 5) it is possible to determine whether a false confession error was harmless.

In the case of trained interviewers, many interrogation teams are practiced in the "Reid technique", which identifies behavioral cues common for a guilty suspect including slouching, fidgeting, and avoiding eye contact. These cues have not been empirically validated to demonstrate deception in scientific studies. In terms of the Miranda warning, it has been found that innocent suspects are more likely to waive their rights than those who are guilty, so therefore Miranda rights in most cases do not protect accused innocents from interrogation (article 1). Through the use of minimization, when an investigator justifies the crime with possible excuses to make it easier to confess to, and the use of the false evidence ploy, mentioning evidence that proves the suspect guilty (which actually does not exist), many innocent people end up confessing to crimes they have not committed. Most people cannot recognize a false confession, because confessions are trusted and a jury or judge would see confessing to a crime in which the suspect did not commit as something against self-interest, which in most people's minds does not make sense. In terms of how harmless a false confession is, it has been shown that confessions can affect other pieces of evidence and the way they are presented, which can affect a judge or jury's perception of guilt. Through debunking these myths it can be demonstrated that confessions cannot be the be-all-end-all in a criminal investigation, and the criminal justice system should implement more tactics and procedures that prevent false confessions from occurring.

== Worldwide ==
=== England and Wales ===
In English law a confession includes:

any statement wholly or partly adverse to the person who made it, whether made to a person in authority or not and whether made in words or otherwise.

A confession may be admitted in evidence so long as it is relevant to any matter in issue and not excluded under the court's discretion.

==== Exclusion of prosecution evidence ====
The court must exclude evidence:

- if the "admission of the evidence would have such an adverse effect on the fairness of the proceedings that the court ought not to admit it", or
- if it was obtained by torture.

The court may exclude evidence:

- in its common law discretion if the prejudicial effect of the evidence outweighs the probative value, or
- under section 76 of the Police and Criminal Evidence Act 1984.

Under section 76, following a representation by the defendant or upon the court's own motion, evidence tendered by the prosecution must not be admitted if it was or may have been obtained:

- by oppression of the person who made it; or
- in consequence of anything said or done which was likely, in the circumstances existing at the time, to render unreliable any confession which might be made by the accused in consequence thereof.

Whether or not evidence was obtained in such circumstances will be decided by a judge sitting without a jury in a voir dire.

Oppression includes torture, inhumane and degrading treatment and the use or threat of violence. Oppression imports "some impropriety... actively applied in an inappropriate manner by the police"

Under the second limb, a judge is not to consider whether the confession made was truthful, but rather whether, under the circumstances, "whatever was said or done, was, in the circumstances existing as at the time of the confession, likely to have rendered such a confession unreliable, whether or not it may be seen subsequently - with hindsight and in the light of all the material available at trial - that it did or did not actually do so". The question of whether some action has rendered a question unreliable centers on whether it is likely to have made an innocent person confess, or even (equivalently) to have made a guilty person confess to more than their actual crime.

"Anything said or done" is not limited to the actions of the police, but does not include things said or done by the accused. However, the circumstances existing at the time do include the accused's own mental state and capacities.

==== Evidence tendered by a co-defendant ====
The court may exclude evidence under section 76A of the Police and Criminal Evidence Act 1984. Following a representation by the defendant or upon the court's own motion, evidence tendered by a co-defendant of a defendant's confession must not be admitted unless the co-defendant proves on the balance of probabilities that it was not obtained:

- by oppression of the person who made it; or
- in consequence of anything said or done which was likely, in the circumstances existing at the time, to render unreliable any confession which might be made by the accused in consequence thereof.

==== Statements made in the presence of the accused ====
The common law rules on the admission of confessions are preserved, and apply so long as the statement was made voluntarily. Under the common law, where a statement is made in the presence of the accused, by a person with whom the accused is on even terms, upon an occasion which should be expected reasonably to call for some explanation or denial from him, the accused's acceptance of that statement, including by giving an insufficient explanation or by acquiescence. In deciding whether to put the matter to the jury, the judge should ask:

(1) could a jury properly directed conclude that the defendant adopted the statement in question?

If so, (2) is that matter of sufficient relevance to justify its introduction in evidence?

If so, (3) would the admission of the evidence have such an adverse effect on the fairness of the proceedings that the judge ought not to admit it?

=== Canada ===
Canadian common law on confessions is derived directly from English decisions and legal principles. There are some differences including the Charter of Rights and Freedoms that give an accused person more rights.

The crown must prove beyond a reasonable doubt that the accused confessed voluntarily or the confession will be excluded from evidence by the judge. The legal term voluntary has a different meaning than the everyday meaning of voluntary.

The crown will be looking to prove the absence of threats, direct or veiled, by the police. Threats will almost certainly render the confession involuntary. This can include threats to arrest or interrogate other persons close to the accused. Promises or inducements made in the form of a quid pro quo (like a confession in exchange for ignoring a more serious charge) will also often result in an inadmissible confession.

Generally, police are allowed to lie by claiming to claim to have evidence, like DNA evidence that does not exist. If police lies cause the suspect to say anything that implicates themselves in the crime the confession would be admitted into evidence. See R. v. Oickle.

=== India ===
No person accused of any offence shall be compelled to be a witness against himself.

— Article 20(3), Constitution of India

In India, forcefully obtaining confession is unconstitutional.

This was reaffirmed on 5 May 2010 by the Supreme Court of India in the case "Smt. Selvi vs. State of Karnataka" in which it was held that Narcoanalysis, polygraph (also called Lie-detector) and brain mapping tests to be unconstitutional as they violate Article 20(3) of the Constitution.

=== Italy ===
Confessions have been used extensively in Italy since the creation of the pentito (Italian for repentant) status. Adriano Sofri, for example, has been given a life-sentence exclusively on the words of one pentito.

=== United States ===
In the 1936 case Brown v. Mississippi, the United States Supreme Court ruled that convictions which are based solely upon confessions coerced by violence violate the Due Process Clause.

Furthermore, once a confession is made, the defendant is seldom, if ever, acquitted.

— Howard B. Terrell, M.D. and William Logan, J.D., American Journal of Forensic Psychiatry, Volume 13, Number 2

According to a study published by the American Journal of Forensic Psychiatry, approximately 80 percent of US criminal cases are solved by a subject's confession.

== See also ==
- Show trial
- Struggle session (Maoist China)
