= Passenger =

Person who travels in a vehicle without operating it

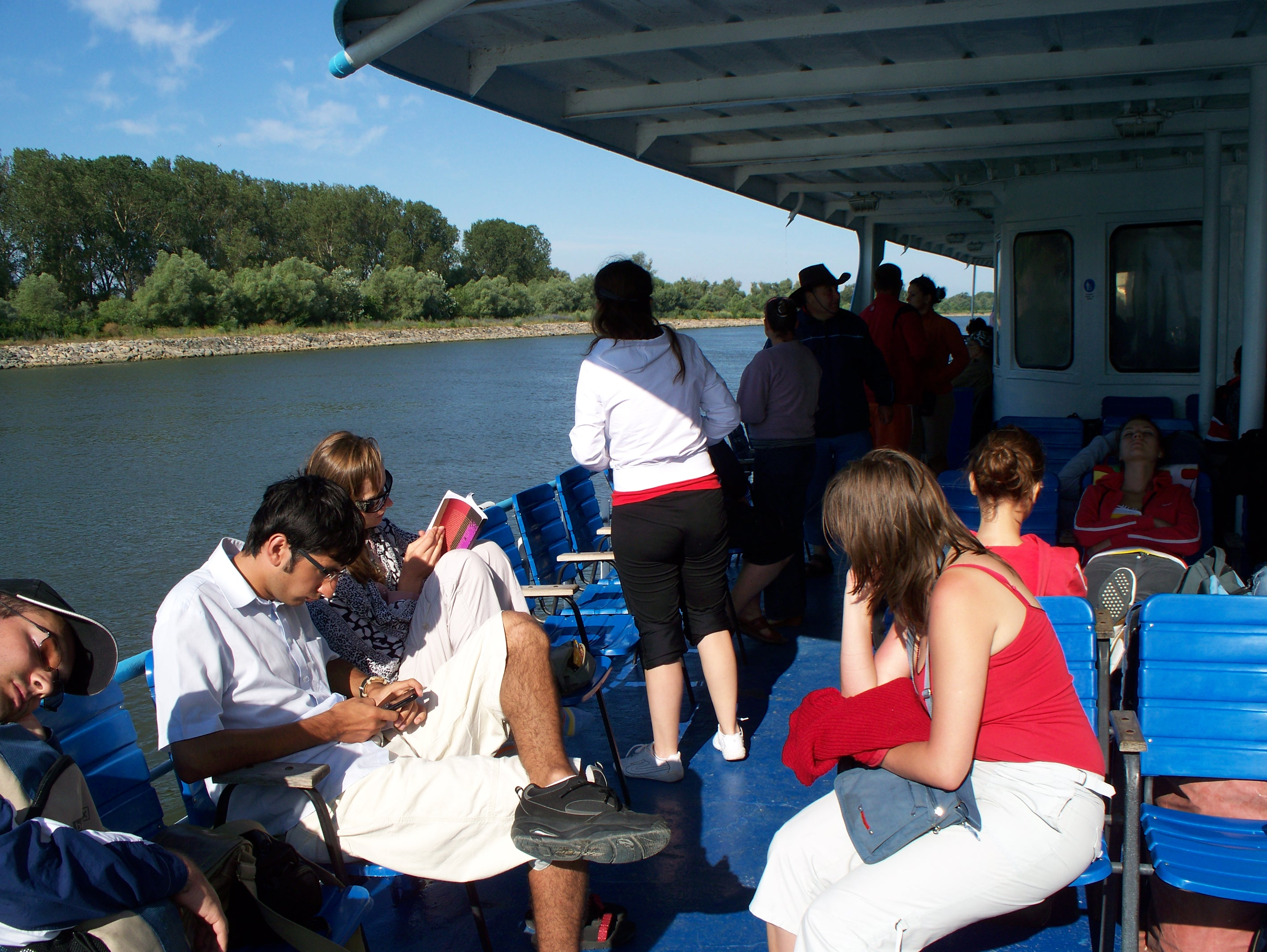
Passengers on a boat in the Danube Delta, 2008

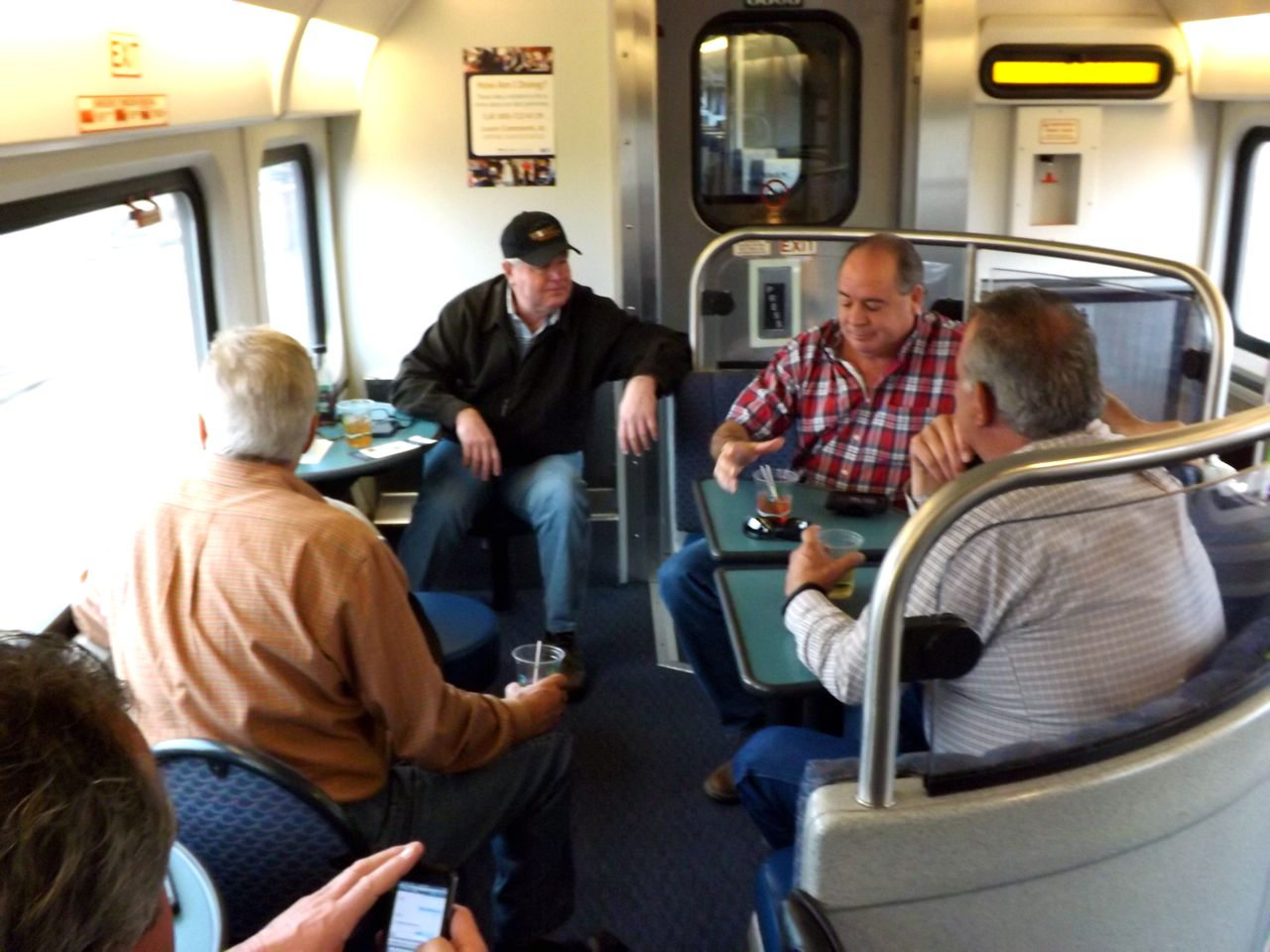
Passengers in the lounge car of an Amtrak San Joaquin train

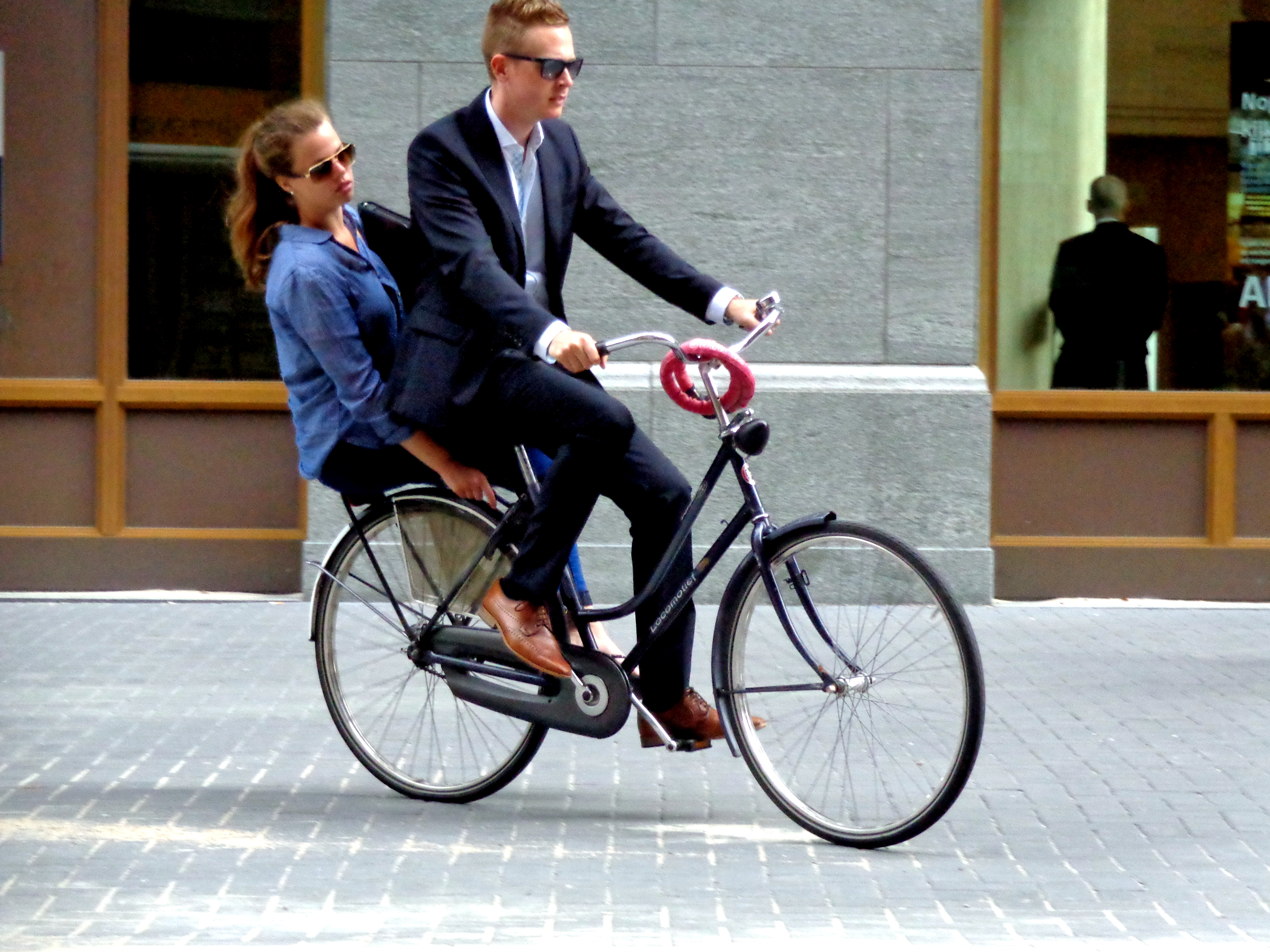
Passenger riding on the back of a bicycle.

A passenger is a person who travels in a vehicle, but does not bear any responsibility for the tasks required for that vehicle to arrive at its destination or otherwise operate the vehicle, and is not a steward. The vehicles may be bicycles, buses, cars, passenger trains, airliners, ships, ferryboats, personal watercraft, all terrain vehicles, snowmobiles, and other methods of transportation.

Crew members (if any), as well as the driver or pilot of the vehicle, are usually not considered passengers. For example, a flight attendant on an airline would not be considered a passenger while on duty and the same with those working in the kitchen or restaurant on board a ship as well as cleaning staff, but an employee riding in a company car being driven by another person would be considered a passenger, even if the car was being driven on company business.

== Legal status ==
In most jurisdictions, laws have been enacted that dictate the legal obligations of the owner of a vehicle or vessel, or of the driver or pilot of the same, towards the passengers. With respect to passengers riding in cars and vans, the driver may owe a duty of care to passengers, particularly where the passenger's presence in the vehicle can be seen to "confer some benefit on the driver other than the benefit of their company or the mere sharing of expenses". In other situations, however, guest statutes may limit the ability of passengers to sue the driver of the vehicle over an accident. Many places require cars to be outfitted with measures specifically for the protection of passengers, such as passenger-side air bags. With respect to passengers on commercial vehicles or vessels, both national laws and international treaties require that the carrier act with a certain standard of care. The number of passengers that a vehicle or vessel may legally carry is defined as its seating capacity.

== Terms ==
=== Revenue passenger ===
A revenue passenger is someone who has paid a transport operator for her or his trip. That excludes non-paying passengers such as airline employees flying on free or nearly-free passes, babies and children who do not have a seat of their own, etc. However, passengers who paid for their trip with a frequent-flyer program mileage award are usually included.

This term is used in the transportation industry, in particular in traffic measures such as revenue passenger kilometer (RPK) and revenue passenger mile (RPM).

The related concept of revenue service refers to when a transit vehicle is providing public transportation and is available to carry passengers. It includes fare-free service, but excludes service provided for specific activities such as school bus services and private charter bus service. Revenue service includes all time when the vehicle is actually providing service to the public, typically by traveling a fixed route, and also includes small amounts of time at each end of the route for layover/recovery time. However, the term does not include time spent on activities such as scheduled meal breaks, operator training, or maintenance testing. It is used only with respect to passenger service.

=== Revenue passenger kilometres ===
Revenue passenger kilometres (RPKs) and revenue passenger miles (RPMs) are measures of traffic for an airline flight, bus, or train calculated by multiplying the number of revenue-paying passengers aboard the vehicle by the distance traveled. On long-distance buses and trains (and some planes), passengers may board and disembark at intermediate stops, in which case RPMs/RPKs have to be calculated for each segment if a careful total is needed.

Revenue passenger miles can be considered the basic amount of "production" that an airline creates. The revenue passenger miles can be compared to the available seat miles over an airline's system to determine the overall passenger load factor. These measurements can further be used to measure unit revenues and unit costs.

=== No pax ===
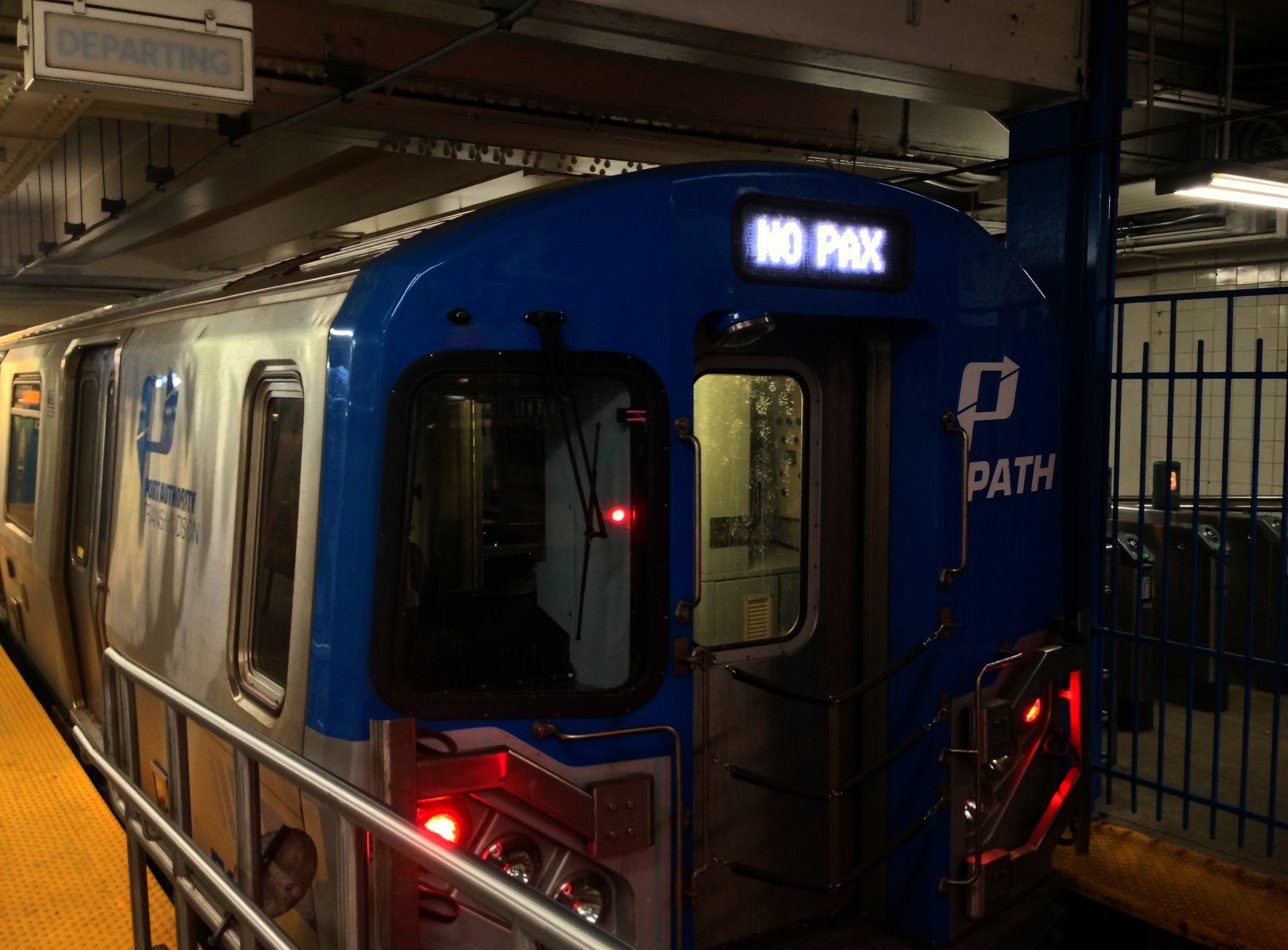
PATH train with "NO PAX" on its destination sign

In transportation, a "no pax" trip is a trip without passengers. For example, no-pax flights are Air cargo, ferry and positioning flights. Similarly, with a public transit bus it can be used at the beginning and end of a driver's work shift to/from the bus terminal, or in the non-commute leg of a commuter bus service.

In such cases, the main display signs on the front and curbside of the bus typically display a message such as "no pax" or "out of service" (sometimes abbreviated as "O/S").

=== British railway passenger train categories ===
In British railway parlance, passenger, as well as being the end user of a service, is also a categorisation of the type of rolling stock used. In the British case, there are several categories of passenger train, which include:

- Express passenger, which constitutes long distance and high speed railway travel between major locations such as ports and cities.
- Semi-fast express passenger, a type of service that is high speed, though stops at selected destinations of high population density en route.
- Local passenger, the lowest category of British passenger train, which provides a service that stops at all stations between major destinations, for the benefit of local populations.
