= NLRB v. Catholic Bishop of Chicago =

- Supreme Court of the United States

Argued October 30, 1978 Decided Mar 21, 1979
- Full case name: National Labor Relations Board v. Catholic Bishop of Chicago et al.
- Citations: 440 U.S. 490 (more) 99 S. Ct. 1313; 59 L. Ed. 2d 533;
- Argument: Oral argument

Case history
- Prior: Seventh Circuit Court of Appeals blocked enforcement of the regulations, 559 F. 2d 1112. cert. granted, 434 U.S. 1061 (1978).
- Subsequent: None

Holding
- The National Labor Relations Board does not have the power under the Wagner Act to regulate parochial religious schools.

Court membership
- Chief Justice Warren E. Burger Associate Justices William J. Brennan Jr. · Potter Stewart; Byron White · Thurgood Marshall; Harry Blackmun · Lewis F. Powell Jr. William Rehnquist · John P. Stevens

Case opinions
- Majority: Burger, joined by Stewart, Powell, Rehnquist, Stevens
- Dissent: Brennan, joined by White, Marshall, Blackmun

Laws applied
- U.S. Const. amend. I; Public Law 74-198, 49 Stat. 449 (Wagner Act)

National Labor Relations Board v. Catholic Bishop of Chicago, 440 U.S. 490 (1979), was a Supreme Court of the United States case that ruled that the National Labor Relations Board did not have the authority to regulate religious schools. The court ruled that the Wagner Act did not grant the board authority over religious schools and that even if it did, that would cause an unconstitutional intrusion of the federal government into religion.

This case serves as one of the foundational pillars of the ministerial exception, a legal doctrine that protects the rights of religious organizations under the Free Exercise Clause and the Establishment Clause.

== Background ==
In 1974 and 1975, union organizations filed petitions with the National Labor Relations Board seeking to unionize lay teachers from seven Midwestern Catholic schools, two that were directly operated by the Archbishop of Chicago and five that were under the Diocese of Fort Wayne-Southbend's jurisdiction.

The schools rejected unionization attempts on the grounds that the board did not possess such authority, and that the Free Exercise Clause protected the school from these regulations, but the board rejected their plea and ordered elections for union representatives to take place.

The schools sued and sought relief from the Court of Appeals for the Seventh Circuit, which in a 3-0 decision, blocked the enforcement of the board's orders. The court rejected the argument from the board that the schools not being "entirely religious" organizations meant that the First Amendment did not impede them, a standard the board had been adopted two years prior.

The board subsequently appealed, and the Supreme Court agreed to hear oral arguments on October 30, 1978.

== Court's decision ==
The court ruled in favor of the Catholic schools, although closely divided 5-4. The argument from the majority rested on two main points:

1. The Wagner Act that established the National Labor Relations Board did not give it the power to regulate parochial religious schools.
2. Even if it did, it would likely be unconstitutional by impeding the schools' religiosity.

For the first point, the court looked at the legislative history of the act and concluded that it was not the intention of Congress to give the Board the power to regulate parochial schools. During the debates on the act, the majority argued, it was clear the main concern was the unfair practices of private employers, not of any public entity, and the act remained silent on specifically religious institutions. The opinion refers to the Taft-Hartley Act, which amended the Wagner Act to explicitly exclude non-profit hospitals from the definition of employer, the standard of which could also be applied to religious schools. An amendment to the original act passed in 1974 to re-include nonprofit hospitals in the definition was also clear in its language not to apply to sectarian institutions. However, the court was silent on whether this ruling applied to other kinds of religious organizations.

For the second point, the court references the Lemon test established seven years earlier, arguing that the board's order violated it by creating an undue entanglement of the government with religion. Since "Religious authority necessarily pervades the school system.", applying these rules to the schools, they argued, would violate the Free Exercise Clause.

=== Dissent ===
Justice William Brennan, joined by three fellow justices filed a dissenting opinion in which he argued that the majority was wrong to state that the board regulating religious schools was against the intent of the congress that originally passed the Wagner Act. Brennan noted the majority applied a way too demanding burden for determining the intent of a law that was written as broadly as the Wagner Act, saying: "The Act's wording, its legislative history, and the Court's own precedents leave 'the intention of the Congress . . . revealed too distinctly to permit us to ignore it because of mere misgivings as to power.'"

== Subsequent developments ==
The court appeared to slightly backtrack on this case's ruling in the 1985 case Tony & Susan Alamo Foundation v. Secretary of Labor where it ruled that the Department of Labor could enforce minimum wage regulations on behalf of lay employees of religious organizations.
