= Rich Owens (corrections officer) =

American executioner

- Born: Richard Ernest Owens; June 19, 1880; Joplin, Missouri, US
- Died: February 26, 1948 (aged 67); North McAlester, Oklahoma, US
- Occupation: Executioner
- Years active: 1915–1947
- Known for: Oklahoma State Executioner
- Predecessor: S.C Treadwell
- Successor: M.E "Big Boy" Elliott
- Spouse: Mattie Freeman
- Children: 3

Richard "Rich" Ernest Owens (June 19, 1880 – February 26, 1948) was Oklahoma's executioner from 1918 to 1947 at the Oklahoma State Penitentiary. Rich Owens killed 66 men, 65 by electrocution and one by hanging. Rich faced murder charges four times in his life, but all four times juries acquitted him. At the age of 13, he killed a horse thief who was riding his father's horse. Owens was also the boss of a prison work crew. He died of liver cancer on February 26, 1948, in North McAlester, Oklahoma.
