= Ashwander v. Tennessee Valley Authority =

- Supreme Court of the United States

Argued December 19, 1935 Decided February 17, 1936
- Full case name: Ashwander v. Tennessee Valley Authority
- Citations: 297 U.S. 288 (more) 56 S. Ct. 466; 80 L. Ed. 688

Case history
- Prior: Certiorari to the Circuit Court of Appeals for the Fifth Circuit, 78 F.2d 578

Holding
- Congress did not abuse its power with the Tennessee Valley Authority, a government corporation established as part of the New Deal to improve the economy of the state.

Court membership
- Chief Justice Charles E. Hughes Associate Justices Willis Van Devanter · James C. McReynolds; Louis Brandeis · George Sutherland; Pierce Butler · Harlan F. Stone; Owen Roberts · Benjamin N. Cardozo

Case opinions
- Majority: Hughes, joined by Van Devanter, Brandeis, Sutherland, Butler, Stone, Roberts, Cardozo
- Concurrence: Brandeis, joined by Stone, Roberts, Cardozo
- Concur/dissent: McReynolds

Ashwander v. Tennessee Valley Authority, 297 U.S. 288 (1936), was a United States Supreme Court case that provided the first elaboration of the doctrine of "Constitutional avoidance".

== Background ==
In Ashwander, the Supreme Court faced a challenge to the constitutionality of a congressional program of development of the Wilson Dam. The plaintiffs, preferred stockholders of the Alabama Power Company, had unsuccessfully protested to the corporation about its contracts with the Tennessee Valley Authority (TVA). Plaintiffs then brought suit against the corporation, the TVA, and others alleging breach of contract and advancing a broad constitutional challenge to the governmental program. In December 1934, Federal Judge William Irwin Grubb held that the government had no right to engage in the power business except to dispose of a surplus incidental to the exercise of some other constitutional function. While he did not directly rule that the TVA was unconstitutional, he issued an injunction that caused Senator George Norris, prime sponsor of the New Deal's power program, to declare: "The effect of the injunction is practically to nullify the whole TVA Act." In July 1935, the injunction was overturned by the 5th Federal Circuit Court in New Orleans. When the matter reached the Supreme Court, the majority did not reach the broadest constitutional questions presented by plaintiffs, but instead upheld Congress's constitutional authority to dispose of electric energy generated at the dam and validated the contracts.

== Majority opinion ==
At the outset, the majority rejected the government's argument that the preferred stockholders did not have standing to bring the suit because the government program was directly competing with a private company. The majority then considered the scope of the constitutional issue presented. The majority found the scope "limited to the validity of the contract" between the parties, rather than extending to the broad challenge to the validity of the entire TVA program. Although the majority refused to issue an advisory opinion on plaintiffs' broader hypothetical and contingent constitutional claims, it did review the constitutionality of the legislation insofar as the plaintiffs had presented facts of a legitimate "case or controversy".

Based on the concrete dispute before the court, the majority concluded that Congress had the war and commerce power authority to construct the Wilson Dam. The majority also found that the disposal of the electric energy generated pursuant to the provisions of the contracts at issue was lawful. Thus, the judgment in Ashwander, in which Justice Brandeis concurred, ultimately did not avoid a constitutional issue.

== Concurrence ==
Justices Cardozo, Roberts and Stone joined the Brandeis concurrence. The concurring Justices would have affirmed the court of appeals' judgment "without passing on it", although they agreed with the majority's conclusion on the constitutional issues it reached. The court of appeals had decided, like the majority, that Congress had the constitutional authority to construct the Wilson Dam and dispose of the surplus energy thereby produced. The concurrence, however, would have affirmed this judgment without reaching the merits because of other infirmities in plaintiffs' case.

Brandeis primarily objected to plaintiffs' standing. His concurrence disagreed with the majority's conclusion that the preferred stockholders could bring the action because they had already voiced their complaints to the corporation without success. Brandeis concluded that plaintiffs had no "right to interfere" in corporate governance under the substantive law, and because the stockholders could allege no injury which the substantive law recognized, they lacked standing to bring suit.

The concurrence then raised an equity bar to the requested relief. The preferred stockholders could not show the "irreparable injury" to their property rights necessary to obtain relief in equity. Plaintiffs had only a limited interest in the corporation and the district court had made no finding that the proposed transactions with the TVA endangered their property interests.

Brandeis also examined other potential hurdles standing between the court and the constitutional issues. He concluded that the power company was estopped from bringing a challenge and thus its stockholders had lost any right to bring a challenge. Finally, according to Brandeis, even if plaintiffs had standing under the substantive law, "courts should, in the exercise of their [equitable] discretion, refuse an injunction unless the alleged invalidity is clear." Brandeis urged a presumption in favor of the validity of any legislative act until "its violation of the [C]onstitution is proved beyond all reasonable doubt."

=== Formulation of the avoidance doctrine ===
The particular part of the Ashwander concurrence that has become famous is its articulation of "[t]he practice in constitutional cases". In describing that "practice", Brandeis set out a broad formulation of the avoidance doctrine.

Brandeis characterized judicial review of the constitutionality of legislative acts as a grave and delicate power for use by fallible, human judges only when its use cannot conscientiously be avoided. This reluctance to use the power of judicial review was, according to Brandeis, predicated on the separation of powers principle that one branch must not "encroach upon the domain of another". Brandeis identified two prominent limitations on the federal judicial power based on the separation principle: the "case or controversy" requirement and the rule that federal courts have no power to render advisory opinions. Brandeis linked a host of justiciability doctrines, including political question and standing inquiries, to these limitations.

Brandeis recited traditional Article III jurisprudence by recognizing well-established constitutional limits on the federal judicial power. The concurrence's theme of judicial restraint is not inconsistent with the majority's decision: a federal court should only decide an actual Article III controversy when the facts present one, and should refuse to render an advisory opinion on the entire TVA program. Brandeis then relied on the avoidance doctrine to argue that the court should not reach the merits of the constitutional issue.

Brandeis described how the court had developed "prudential" rules – meaning nonconstitutional, self-imposed restraints – by which to avoid "passing upon a large part of all the constitutional questions" presented to it, despite having jurisdiction to hear them. He described the avoidance doctrine as consisting of a "series" of seven rules:

1. "The Court will not pass upon the constitutionality of legislation in a friendly, non-adversary, proceeding ...";
2. "The Court will not 'anticipate a question of constitutional law in advance of the necessity of deciding it.'"
3. "The Court will not 'formulate a rule of constitutional law broader than is required by the precise facts to which it is to be applied.'"
4. The Court will not pass upon a constitutional question, although properly presented by the record, if there is also present some other ground upon which the case may be disposed.
5. The Court will not pass upon the constitutionality of a statute unless the plaintiff was injured by operation of the statute.
6. "The Court will not pass upon the constitutionality of a statute at the instance of one who has availed himself of its benefits."
7. Even if "serious doubt[s]" concerning the validity of an act of Congress are raised, the court will first ascertain "whether a construction of the statute is fairly possible by which the question may be avoided".

Brandeis concludes his discussion of the avoidance doctrine with this warning: "One branch of the government cannot encroach upon the domain of another, without danger. The safety of our institutions depends in no small degree on a strict observance of this salutary rule."

== Analysis of the seven rules ==
=== Rules related to Article III requirements ===
The first rule bars collusive suits as not proper cases or controversies under Article III. Brandeis relied on Atherton Mills v. Johnston, in which the court dismissed a challenge to a congressional act regulating child labor as moot, in support of the first rule. As Professor Alexander Bickel points out, however, Atherton Mills was "a case of quite conventional mootness, hardly apt as an illustration of judicial self-restraint in constitutional litigation". Mootness, a justiciability doctrine, serves to ensure that a controversy is "live" and in need of judicial resolution. For Brandeis, however, Atherton Mills represented the issue of collusive suits arranged to obtain fast and convenient adjudication of constitutional issues. Brandeis elaborated on this concern in Ashwander, declaring judicial review of the constitutionality of legislative acts legitimate only as a last resort, and as a necessity in the determination of real, earnest and vital controversies between individuals. It was never the thought that a party beaten in the legislature could transfer to the courts, by means of a friendly suit, an inquiry as to the constitutionality of the legislative act.

Federal courts thereby safeguard their limited power by barring such nonadversarial, fake controversies – suits over which an Article III court has no jurisdiction. The court has described the requirement of standing as "closely related" to the rule against entertaining friendly, collusive suits. This first rule of avoidance also overlaps with the ripeness requirement, discussed in conjunction with the second rule.

The second rule of the avoidance doctrine mirrors the ripeness requirement in that it obliges federal courts to refrain from deciding a dispute prematurely. The primary rationale for the ripeness doctrine, another justiciability doctrine arising from the case or controversy requirement, is "to prevent the courts, through avoidance of premature adjudication, from entangling themselves in abstract disagreements". In a leading case on ripeness, Poe v. Ullman, the court relied on the avoidance doctrine to set the stage for its decision that the controversy was not ripe. In Poe, Justice Felix Frankfurter described the Ashwander rules as arising from the "historically defined, limited nature and function of courts" and from the separation of powers principle.

Moreover, the rules recognize that adjudication within an adversary system functions best in the presence of "a lively conflict" between actively pressed antagonistic demands, making resolution of the controverted issue a practical necessity. Frankfurter termed the justiciability doctrines of standing, ripeness, and mootness as merely "several manifestations ... of the primary conception that federal judicial power is to be exercised to strike down legislation ... only at the instance of one who is himself immediately harmed, or immediately threatened with harm, by the challenged action." The first two rules of the avoidance doctrine are, thus, closely linked to well-recognized justiciability requirements, and serve as alternative, but not distinctive, limitations on the federal judicial power.

Standing, another justiciability doctrine derived from the "case or controversy" requirement, requires a litigant to allege that she has personally suffered or imminently will suffer a concrete injury, fairly traceable to the defendant's conduct, and that the court's decision will likely redress her injury. Standing includes both constitutional and prudential components. The third rule of the avoidance doctrine requires federal courts facing constitutional issues to rule no more broadly than the precise facts require. This rule may reflect the fact-specific focus of the standing inquiry. The fifth rule, which requires that the challenged legislation injure the plaintiff, mirrors the injury and causation components of the standing requirement.

Cases construing the prudential component of the standing doctrine have relied on the avoidance doctrine. Prudence gives rise to, among other doctrines, the prohibition against third-party standing. One policy underlying the prohibition is the desire to avoid unnecessary constitutional adjudication. The court, in explicating the bar against third-party standing, has described Brandeis' Ashwander rules as "offering the standing requirement as one means by which courts avoid unnecessary constitutional adjudications". A second prudential restriction is the bar against finding standing for a generalized grievance – a harm shared in substantially equal measure by all or a large group of citizens. The court has also linked this standing bar to the avoidance doctrine: the requirement of an individualized injury serves to ensure that "there is a real need to exercise the power of judicial review in order to protect the interests of the complaining party". Indeed, the avoidance doctrine may be an early formulation of the justiciability doctrines.

Rules three and five of the avoidance doctrine thus echo concerns addressed by the constitutional and prudential limitations of standing and ripeness. In some cases, the tenets of the avoidance doctrine addressed above – rules 1, 2, 3 and 5 – may serve to buttress the conclusion that a case is not justiciable, or that a case is justiciable but the court will voluntarily decline to exercise its jurisdiction for prudential reasons. The avoidance doctrine as set out in these rules functions primarily as a supplement to established doctrines of standing and ripeness.

=== Rules reflecting largely prudential concerns ===
The sixth rule of the avoidance doctrine provides that a court will not rule upon the constitutionality of a statute at the instance of one who has benefitted from the statute. In support of this rule, Brandeis cited cases in which a party waived its ability to object to a statute because the party had pursued benefits afforded under the statute in one proceeding prior to challenging the statute's constitutionality in a separate judicial proceeding. The Supreme Court later distinguished cases relying on the "estoppel to sue" doctrine as being cases in which "litigants had received or sought advantages from the statute that they wished to attack, advantages other than the mere right to sue". The sixth rule may be of relatively little importance today. To the extent the estoppel principle was based on a doctrine forbidding parties from asserting inconsistent positions in judicial proceedings, Federal Rule of Civil Procedure 8(d)(3) now expressly allows alternative or inconsistent allegations ("Inconsistent Claims or Defenses. A party may state as many separate claims or defenses as it has, regardless of consistency"). Moreover, broad modern principles of claim preclusion appear to address adequately the concern reflected in the cases cited for the estoppel principle.

The seventh rule of the avoidance doctrine derives from the familiar canon of statutory construction that a statute "ought not to be construed to violate the Constitution if any other possible construction remains available". The canon and the rule are identical and, not surprisingly, often used interchangeably. Indeed, the canon of statutory construction is grounded in large part upon the well-established practice of not reaching constitutional questions unnecessarily. The seventh rule poses an alternative to the directive of the last resort rule. Through statutory construction rules, it may also be possible to avoid a constitutional question.

== See also ==
- Brandeis's Ashwander Rules
- Tennessee Valley Authority v. Hill
