= Dobson v. Commissioner =

- Supreme Court of the United States

Argued November 8, 1943 Decided December 20, 1943
- Full case name: Dobson v. Commissioner
- Citations: 320 U.S. 489 (more) 64 S.Ct. 239; 88 L. Ed. 248; 1943 U.S. LEXIS 1148

Case history
- Prior: Harwick v. Commissioner of Internal Revenue, 133 F.2d 732 (8th Cir. 1943)
- Subsequent: Rehearing denied, February 14, 1944

Court membership
- Chief Justice Harlan F. Stone Associate Justices Owen Roberts · Hugo Black; Stanley F. Reed · Felix Frankfurter; William O. Douglas · Frank Murphy; Robert H. Jackson · Wiley B. Rutledge

Case opinion
- Majority: Jackson, joined by a unanimous court

Laws applied
- Internal Revenue Code

Dobson v. Commissioner, 320 U.S. 489 (1943), was a United States Supreme Court case related to income tax.

== Background ==
=== Facts ===
Four cases were consolidated in the United States Court of Appeals for the Eighth Circuit. The facts of one define the issue present in all.

The taxpayer, Collins, in 1929 purchased 300 shares of stock of the National City Bank of New York, which carried certain beneficial interests in stock of the National City Company. The latter company was the seller and the transaction occurred in Minnesota.

In 1930 Collins sold 100 shares, sustaining a deductible loss of $41,600.80, which was claimed on his tax return for that year and allowed. In 1931 he sold another 100 shares, sustaining a deductible loss of $28,163.78, which was claimed in his return and allowed. The remaining 100 shares he retained. He regarded the purchases and sales as closed and completed transactions.

In 1936, Collins learned that the stock had not been registered in compliance with the Minnesota Blue Sky Laws and learned of facts indicating that he had been induced to purchase by fraudulent representations. He filed suit against the seller, alleging fraud and failure to register. Collins asked rescission of the entire transaction and offered to return the proceeds of the stock, or an equivalent number of shares plus such interest and dividends as he had received.

In 1939 the suit was settled, on a basis which gave Collins a net recovery of $45,150.63, of which $23,296.45 was allocable to the stock sold in 1930 and $6,454.18 allocable to that sold in 1931.

=== Tax return ===
In his return for 1939 Collins did not report as income any part of the recovery. Throughout that year adjustment of his 1930 and 1931 tax liability was barred by the statute of limitations.

=== Tax commissioner ===
The Commissioner adjusted Collins' 1939 gross income by adding as ordinary gain the recovery attributable to the shares sold, but not that portion of it attributable to the shares unsold. The recovery upon the shares sold was not, however, sufficient to make good the taxpayer's original investment in them. And if the amounts recovered had been added to the proceeds received in 1930 and 1931 they would not have altered Collins' income tax liability for those years, for even if the entire deductions claimed on account of these losses had been disallowed, the returns would still have shown net losses.

=== Tax court ===
Collins sought a redetermination by the Board of Tax Appeals, now the Tax Court. He contended that the recovery of 1939 was in the nature of a return of capital from which he realized no gain and no income either actually or constructively, and that he had received no tax benefit from the loss deductions. In the alternative he argued that if the recovery could be called income at all it was taxable as capital gain. The Commissioner insisted that the entire recovery was taxable as ordinary gain and that it was immaterial whether the taxpayer had obtained any tax benefits from the loss deduction reported in prior years. The Tax Court sustained the taxpayer's contention that he had realized no taxable gain from the recovery.

The United States Court of Appeals for the Eighth Circuit concluded that the "tax benefit theory" applied by the Tax Court "seems to be an injection into the law of an equitable principle, found neither in the statutes nor in the regulations." Because the Tax Court's reasoning was not embodied in any statutory precept, the court held that the Tax Court was not authorized to resort to it in determining whether the recovery should be treated as income or return of capital. It held as matter of law that the recoveries were neither return of capital nor capital gain, but were ordinary income in the year received.

In actions by petitioners challenging adjustments to their gross income made when respondent included recovery of certain previously claimed losses, the Tax Court awarded judgments based on the pertinent facts of the transactions as a whole, and determined that taxable gain was realized only where the deductions in prior years had offset gross income for those years.

=== Certiorari ===
Certiorari was granted to the Circuit Court of Appeals for the Eighth Circuit, to review a decision as to whether recovery of certain losses was treated as income or return of capital, in actions by petitioner taxpayers challenging the correctness of alleged income tax deficiencies by respondent Commission of Internal Revenue. "Questions important to tax administration were involved, conflict was said to exist, and we granted certiorari."

== Opinion of the court ==
The court affirmed in part, and reversed in part the decision of the Tax Court. The court held that the Tax Court's decisions improperly relied on reasoning not embodied in any statutory or regulatory precept, and thus were not in accordance with the law. The court was not empowered to revise the Tax Court's decisions because of a difference of opinion on the existence of deficiencies. The Tax Court's decision settled matters of proper accounting, rather than questions of law, where no statute or regulation directed its method of deficiency determination. Since there was a rational basis for the Tax Court's factual determinations of petitioners' economic gain and tax benefit, the court possessed no compelling reason to substitute its judgment.

Justice Jackson, writing for the court, noted that Burnet v. Sanford & Brooks Co. "suggested its own distinction," i.e., "While [the money received] equalled, and in a loose sense was a return of, expenditures made in performing the contract, still, as the Board of Tax Appeals found, the expenditures were made in defraying the expenses. . . . They were not capital investments, the cost of which, if converted, must first be restored from the proceeds before there is a capital gain taxable as income."
