= Assignment of income doctrine =

The assignment of income doctrine is a judicial doctrine developed in United States case law by courts trying to limit tax evasion. The assignment of income doctrine seeks to "preserve the progressive rate structure of the Code by prohibiting the splitting of income among taxable entities."

== History ==
The United States Supreme Court created the assignment of income doctrine in the Lucas v. Earl decision. The Supreme Court held that income from services is taxed to the party who performed the services. To elaborate on this principle, the decision used the metaphor that "the fruits cannot be attributed to a different tree from that on which they grew." The case is used to support the proposition that the substance of the transaction, rather than the form, is controlling for tax purposes.

The doctrine was later expanded in the Helvering v. Horst decision to include income from property. The decision relied on the principle that the power to dispose of income and the enjoyment of property's economic benefits is the equivalent of ownership.

== Impact ==
This doctrine has important implications for taxpayers trying to shift their tax burden to another person. When assigning income to another person (particularly a family member) in the form of a gift, the courts will usually see it as a way to avoid tax and thus consider it “fruit.” Only in an arms-length sale do the courts see the “tree” itself being moved.

== See also ==
- Transfer pricing
- Kiddie tax
