= Poe v. Seaborn =

- Supreme Court of the United States

Argued October 21, 1930 Decided November 24, 1930
- Full case name: Poe, Collector of Internal Revenue v. Seaborn
- Citations: 282 U.S. 101 (more) 51 S.Ct. 58; 75 L. Ed. 239; 1930 U.S. LEXIS 7

Case history
- Prior: Seaborn v. Poe, 32 F.2d 916 (W.D. Wash. 1929)

Court membership
- Chief Justice Charles E. Hughes Associate Justices Oliver W. Holmes Jr. · Willis Van Devanter; James C. McReynolds · Louis Brandeis; George Sutherland · Pierce Butler; Harlan F. Stone · Owen Roberts

Case opinion
- Majority: Roberts
- Hughes and Stone took no part in the consideration or decision of the case.

Poe v. Seaborn, 282 U.S. 101 (1930), was a United States Supreme Court case in which the Court held that a married person's income may be divided with his spouse in a community property state for purposes of U.S. federal income taxation. The Seaborns were residents of the State of Washington, a community property state, and each reported one-half of Mr. Seaborn's salary and other sources of income on their separate income tax returns. The Collector of Internal Revenue determined that the entire income should have been reported in Mr. Seaborn's return. The district court ruled in favor of Mr. Seaborn, and the Supreme Court affirmed. In doing so, the Court distinguished Lucas v. Earl, in which the Court disallowed income splitting by entering into a contract with one's wife, by noting that the earnings in Mr. Seaborn's case are property of the community by state law. In 1948, the United States Congress responded to the different treatment of married taxpayers in community property states and non-community property states by allowing all married couples to take advantage of the "income splitting" joint return.

== Facts and Procedural History ==
H. G. Seaborn and his wife were residents of the State of Washington, a community property state. In their separate 1927 income tax returns, the Seaborns each reported one-half of Mr. Seaborn's salary, as well as income from interest on bank deposits, bonds, dividends, and profits on real and personal property in his name. It was undisputed that the entirety of the Seaborns' income, which amounted to more than $38,000, constituted community property. Each spouse's reporting one-half of the community income allowed the Seaborns to reduce their income tax under the progressive rate structure of federal income taxation. The Commissioner of Internal Revenue assessed a surtax, determining that the entire income should have been reported in Mr. Seaborn's return. Mr. Seaborn paid under protest and brought this suit in federal district court to recover the amount.

The district court rendered judgment for Mr. Seaborn. The Collector of Internal Revenue appealed, and the Circuit Court of Appeals certified the question to the Supreme Court.

== Holding ==
The Supreme Court affirmed the decision of the district court. Justice Owen Roberts delivered the opinion of the Court, while Chief Justice Hughes and Justice Stone did not partake in the consideration or decision of the case. The Court held that in a community property state such as Washington, the Seaborns were entitled to file separate income tax returns, with each spouse reporting one-half of the community income as his or her income. The Court explained that by operation of Washington state law, Mrs. Seaborn has a vested property right in the community property that is equal with Mr. Seaborn's, and therefore, in the community income. In doing so, the Court rejected the Collector's argument that the husband is "essentially" the owner of the community property since he has "broad powers of control and alienation" over the community income, and thus should be taxed accordingly.

The Supreme Court distinguished Lucas v. Earl, decided by the Court approximately eight months before Seaborn. In Earl, the Court reversed the decision of the Ninth Circuit Court of Appeals and ruled against the taxpayer, who had entered into a contract with his wife providing that all subsequent earnings would be held by them as joint tenants. Justice Roberts explained that Earl presented "quite a different question from this, because here, by law, the earnings are never the property of the husband, but that of the community."

== Subsequent Developments ==
The Supreme Court's decision in Poe v. Seaborn conferred significant tax advantages upon married couples residing in community property states. It also meant, however, that spouses in non-community property states were disadvantaged by their inability to shift income. The effects of this disparity became even more significant as marginal tax rates rose around World War II. Consequently, between 1939 and 1947, several states adopted community property regimes, including Michigan, Nebraska, Oklahoma, Oregon, and Pennsylvania.

In response to the states' adoption of community property laws, Congress passed the Revenue Act of 1948, which stated that "[e]qualization is provided for the tax burdens of married couples in common-law and community-property States." The Act allowed all married couples to file an "income splitting" joint return. Shortly after Congress passed the Act, many states repealed their community property laws.

== See also ==
- Community property
- Income taxation
- Lucas v. Earl
