= Salvatore v. Commissioner =

- Court: United States Tax Court
- Full case name: Susie Salvatore v. Commissioner
- Decided: February 4, 1970
- Citations: T.C. Memo 1970-30; 29 T.C.M. (CCH) 89; RIA T.C. Memo ¶ 70030 (1970)

Case history
- Subsequent action: 434 F.2d 600

Court membership
- Judge sitting: Featherstone

Case opinions
- Petitioner is taxable on all of the gain realized on the sale of the gas station

Salvatore v. Commissioner
- Court: United States Court of Appeals for the Second Circuit
- Full case name: Susie Salvatore, Appellant, v. Commissioner of Internal Revenue, Appellee
- Decided: November 30, 1970
- Citation: 434 F.2d 600

Case history
- Prior actions: T.C. Memo 1970-30; 29 T.C.M. (CCH) 89; RIA T.C. Memo ¶ 70030 (1970)

Court membership
- Judges sitting: Irving Kaufman, Paul Raymond Hays, and John Joseph Gibbons

Case opinions
- The Tax Court was not clearly erroneous and therefore the decision was affirmed.

Salvatore v. Commissioner is an opinion from the United States Tax Court that holds that a taxpayer cannot avoid paying taxes on the sale of property by first conveying that property to someone else. This opinion was later affirmed by the United States Court of Appeals for the Second Circuit. This case outlines some limitations on the "fruit-and-tree" metaphor established in Lucas v. Earl, 281 U.S. 111 (1930) and further developed in Helvering v. Horst, 311 U.S. 112 (1940). Decided in 1970, the case arose when a taxpayer tried to avoid paying capital gains tax from sale of property by giving a share in that property to her children. She then paid a gift tax, which is significantly less than the tax on the gain would have been if she had not given a share to her children.

== Background ==
Prior to his death on October 7, 1948, Susie Salvatore's husband owned and operated a gas station in Greenwich, Connecticut. Upon his death, his entire estate was bequeathed to his wife. For the next several years, Susie Salvatore, her three sons, and one of her two daughters operated the gas station.

As time passed, several of the Salvatore children moved on while the land on which the gas station was located became increasingly valuable, to the point where several oil companies made offers to purchase the property. The family rejected several proposals, until in the summer of 1963, Texaco, Inc. made a proposal to purchase the land for $295,000.

To ensure Susie Salvatore's accustomed weekly stipend (received from the operation of the gas station), she was to receive $100,000 of the proceeds. The remainder was to be divided amongst her children. To effectuate this, petitioner conveyed a one-half interest in the property to the children and the deeds would be executed by the children and petitioner when conveying the property to Texaco.

On July 24, 1963, the Salvatore family formally accepted the offer from Texaco. Not until August 28, 1963, however, was a warranty deed conveying an undivided one-half interest in the property to her five children executed. On that same date, warranty deeds were executed conveying the property to Texaco, at which point Texaco paid the balance of the purchase price (less the $50,000 mortgage).

In 1963, Susie Salvatore then filed a Federal gift tax return reporting gifts of 1/10 interest in the property to each of the five children. In her income tax return for that year, she only reported her share of the gain from the sale of the gas station as a long-term capital gain plus a small ordinary gain. The children reported their respective shares on their income tax forms as well.

The Commissioner of Internal Revenue contested that the entire gain on the sale of the property was taxable as a long-term capital gain, a tax much higher than the gift tax paid by Susie Salvatore.

== Holding ==
The United States Tax Court ruled that the petitioner, Susie Salvatore, was taxable on all of the gain realized on the sale of the gas station.

The Tax Court ruled that this decision was subject to the precedent set in the Supreme Court case of Commissioner v. Court Holding Co., in which the Supreme Court stated:

The incidence of taxation depends upon the substance of a transaction. The tax consequences which arise from gains from a sale of property are not finally to be determined solely by the means employed to transfer legal title. Rather, the transaction must be viewed as a whole, and each step, from the commencement of negotiations to the consummation of the sale is relevant. A sale by one person cannot be transformed for tax purposes into a sale by another by using the latter as a conduit through which to pass title. To permit the true nature of a transaction to be disguised by mere formalisms, which exist solely to alter tax liabilities, would seriously impair the effective administration of the tax policies of Congress.

The Tax Court viewed the petitioner's children as "conduit's through which to pass title" and stated that, "the form of a transaction cannot be permitted to prevail over its substance. In substance, petitioner made an anticipatory assignment to her children of one-half of the income from the sale of the property." On a similar note, "[H]er tax liabilities cannot be altered by a rearrangement of the legal title after she had already contracted to sell the property to Texaco."

Susie Salvatore later appealed this decision.

On appeal, the ruling made by the United States Tax Court was affirmed by the United States Court of Appeals for the Second Circuit on the grounds that the tax court was not clearly erroneous. The court held that the evidence supported the conclusion that Susie Salvatore was the sole owner of the property upon its sale, and that the Salvatore children were not sellers but mere "conduits."

== Other relevant cases ==
In Helvering v. Horst, the United States Supreme Court held:

that transfers of the rights to income may not be effective in shifting the tax burden to the recipient of that income

In Estate of Stranahan v. Commissioner, the United States Court of Appeals for the Sixth Circuit addressed the situation where the income rights are sold instead of gifted.
