= Burnet v. Sanford & Brooks Co. =

- Supreme Court of the United States

Argued December 5, 8, 1930 Decided January 5, 1931
- Full case name: Burnet, Commissioner of Internal Revenue, v. Sanford & Brooks Co.
- Citations: 282 U.S. 359 (more) 51 S. Ct. 150; 75 L. Ed. 383; 1931 U.S. LEXIS 7; 2 U.S. Tax Cas. (CCH) ¶ 636; 9 A.F.T.R. (P-H) 603; 1931-1 C.B. 363; 1931 P.H. P389

Case history
- Prior: Sanford & Brooks Co. v. Commissioner, 11 B.T.A. 452 (1928); reversed, 35 F.2d 312 (4th Cir. 1929); cert. granted, 281 U.S. 707 (1930).

Holding
- An annual accounting system is a practical necessity if the federal income tax is to produce revenue ascertainable and payable at regular intervals.

Court membership
- Chief Justice Charles E. Hughes Associate Justices Oliver W. Holmes Jr. · Willis Van Devanter; James C. McReynolds · Louis Brandeis; George Sutherland · Pierce Butler; Harlan F. Stone · Owen Roberts

Case opinion
- Majority: Stone, joined by unanimous

Laws applied
- Sixteenth Amendment; Internal Revenue Code

Burnet v. Sanford & Brooks Co., 282 U.S. 359 (1931), was a case heard before the United States Supreme Court dealing with accounting for purposes of federal income tax and the Sixteenth Amendment to the United States Constitution. The case held that an annual accounting system is a practical necessity if the federal income tax is to produce revenue ascertainable and payable at regular intervals.

The case was decided at a time when losses could not be carried forward to future years. Since 2018, Section 172 of the Internal Revenue Code now generally allows a taxpayer to use net operating losses from previous years to deduct up to 80% of income for a given year.
