= Lucas v. Earl =

- Supreme Court of the United States

Argued March 3, 1930 Decided March 17, 1930
- Full case name: Robert H. Lucas, Commissioner of Internal Revenue v. Earl
- Citations: 281 U.S. 111 (more) 50 S. Ct. 241; 74 L. Ed. 731; 1930 U.S. LEXIS 738

Case history
- Prior: Earl v. Commissioner, 30 F.2d 898 (9th Cir. 1929); cert. granted, 280 U.S. 538 (1929).

Holding
- All of a husband's earnings are to be taxed to husband even though husband and wife had previously entered into an agreement under which all earnings of husband and wife “shall be treated and considered and hereby is declared to be received, held, taken, and owned by us as joint tenants, and not otherwise, with the right of survivorship.”

Court membership
- Chief Justice Charles E. Hughes Associate Justices Oliver W. Holmes Jr. · Willis Van Devanter; James C. McReynolds · Louis Brandeis; George Sutherland · Pierce Butler; Harlan F. Stone

Case opinion
- Majority: Holmes, joined by unanimous
- Hughes took no part in the consideration or decision of the case.

Lucas v. Earl, 281 U.S. 111 (1930), is a United States Supreme Court case concerning U.S. Federal income taxation, about a man who reported only half of his earnings for years 1920 and 1921. Guy C. Earl and his wife had entered into a contract that would potentially save a lot of tax. The contract specified that earnings were owned by the couple as joint tenants. It is unlikely that it was tax-motivated, since there was no income tax in 1901 when they executed the contract. Justice Oliver Wendell Holmes Jr. delivered the Court’s opinion which generally stands for the proposition that income from services is taxed to the party who performed the services. The case is used to support the proposition that the substance of the transaction, rather than the form, is controlling for tax purposes.

== Facts and procedural history ==
Guy C. Earl was an attorney who entered into a contract with his wife whereby all property and earnings were to be "treated and considered . . . to be . . . owned by us [Earl and his wife] as joint tenants . . . with rights of survivorship." Because of the contract, Earl only reported half of his salary as his income. The issue before the court centered on whether Guy Earl alone or, alternatively, Earl and his wife, should be taxed on the salary and attorneys fees earned by Earl in 1920 and 1921.

The Bureau of Internal Revenue (the predecessor to the Internal Revenue Service) determined, and the Board of Tax Appeals (predecessor to the United States Tax Court) ruled, that the tax imposed on Mr. Earl was imposed on his entire salary, including the portion assigned to his wife. Earl appealed, and the decision was reversed by the Circuit Court of Appeals for the Ninth Circuit.

== Holding: the Anticipatory Assignment of Income Doctrine ==
The validity of Earl’s contract was not questioned. However, the U.S. Supreme Court reversed the decision of the Ninth Circuit Court of Appeals and ruled in favor of the tax collector. The Supreme Court indicated there was "no doubt that the statute could tax salaries to those who earned them and provide that the tax could not be escaped by anticipatory arrangements and contracts however skillfully devised to prevent the salary when paid from vesting even for a second in the man who earned it." Holmes concludes his opinion with the classic metaphor: The fruits cannot be attributed to a different tree from that on which they grew.

== Married filing status ==
In Poe v. Seaborn, 282 U.S. 101 (1930), decided the same year, the Supreme Court did allow a Washington couple to split income from property pursuant to State property laws. Congress later (in the Revenue Act of 1948) eliminated the different tax results between community property states and common law states by creating married filing statuses.

== See also ==
- List of United States Supreme Court cases, volume 281
- Poe v. Seaborn, 282 U.S. 101 (1930)
