= O'Gorman & Young, Inc. v. Hartford Fire Insurance Co. =

O'Gorman & Young, Inc. v. Hartford Fire Ins. Co.
- Supreme Court of the United States

Argued October 30, 1930 Decided January 5, 1931
- Full case name: O'Gorman & Young, Inc. v. Hartford Fire Ins. Co.; O'Gorman & Young, Inc. v. Phoenix Assurance Co. Ltd.
- Citations: 282 U.S. 251 (more) 51 S.Ct. 130; 75 L. Ed. 324; 1931 U.S. LEXIS 905

Case history
- Prior: Cert. to the Court of Errors and Appeals of New Jersey, to review a judgment against the appellant in actions which it brought against the Insurance Companies to recover moneys claimed to be due to it for services as local agent. 105 N.J.L. 642; 20 Gummere 642; 146 A. 370

Holding
- A state statute limiting the commissions allowable by insurers against loss by fire to local agents will be deemed a valid exercise of the police power in the absence of facts showing it to be unreasonable.

Court membership
- Chief Justice Charles E. Hughes Associate Justices Oliver W. Holmes Jr. · Willis Van Devanter; James C. McReynolds · Louis Brandeis; George Sutherland · Pierce Butler; Harlan F. Stone · Owen Roberts

Case opinions
- Majority: Brandeis, joined by Hughes, Holmes, Stone and Roberts
- Dissent: Van Devanter, McReynolds, Sutherland, Butler

O'Gorman & Young, Inc. v. Hartford Fire Ins. Co., 282 U.S. 251 (1931), was a case in which the United States Supreme Court held that a state statute limiting the commissions allowable by insurers against loss by fire to local agents will be deemed a valid exercise of the police power in the absence of facts showing it to be unreasonable.

== Facts & procedural history ==
A New Jersey statute required rates for fire insurance to be reasonable. O'Gorman and Young, Inc., a domestic corporation licensed as an insurance broker, sued a licensed foreign fire insurance company to recover a balance alleged to be due for services performed as local agent. O'Gorman and Young had contracts with both the Hartford Fire Insurance Company and the Phoenix Assurance Company which agreed to pay the agent 25% of the premiums, both insurance companies paid only 20%. O'Gorman and Young alleged that the statute violated the Due Process Clause of the Fourteenth Amendment and the Contracts Clause of the United States and New Jersey constitutions. The trial court ruled in favor of the insurance companies, finding that a law is presumed to be reasonable until a contrary showing is made. The New Jersey Court of Errors and Appeals affirmed in a per curiam opinion.

== Decision ==
The United States Supreme Court affirmed a judgment in favor of the insurance companies in O'Gorman and Young's action to recover payment for services rendered as a local agent. Writing for a 5-4 majority, Justice Brandeis cited German Alliance Insurance Co. v. Lewis (1914) for the proposition that the insurance business is so far affected with a public interest that a state may regulate insurance rates. Aside from insurance rates, the case is better known for Brandeis's statement that "[a]s underlying questions of fact may condition the constitutionality of legislation of this character, the presumption of constitutionality must prevail in the absence of some factual foundation of record for overthrowing the statute."

== See also ==
- List of United States Supreme Court cases, volume 282
