= Educational Films Corp. v. Ward =

- Supreme Court of the United States

Decided January 12, 1931
- Full case name: Educational Films Corp. v. Ward
- Citations: 282 U.S. 379 (more) 51 S. Ct. 170; 75 L. Ed. 400

Holding
- A corporate income tax may include royalties from copyrights in its calculation of overall income even though direct income from copyrights, a federal institution, is immune from state taxation.

Court membership
- Chief Justice Charles E. Hughes Associate Justices Oliver W. Holmes Jr. · Willis Van Devanter; James C. McReynolds · Louis Brandeis; George Sutherland · Pierce Butler; Harlan F. Stone · Owen Roberts

Case opinions
- Majority: Stone
- Dissent: Sutherland, joined by Van Devanter, Butler

Educational Films Corp. v. Ward, 282 U.S. 379 (1931), was a United States Supreme Court case in which the Court held a state's corporate income tax may include royalties from copyrights in its calculation of overall income for the purposes of a franchise tax, even though direct income from copyrights, a federal institution, is immune from state taxation.
