= Teschner v. Commissioner =

1962 American tax court case

- Court: United States Tax Court
- Full case name: Paul A. Teschner and Barbara M. Teschner v Commissioner of Internal Revenue
- Decided: September 28, 1962
- Citations: 38 T.C. 1003; 1962 U.S. Tax Ct. LEXIS 65

Court membership
- Judges sitting: Train, Dawson, Mulroney, Atkins, Tietjens, Clarence V. Opper, Arnold Raum, Withey, Pierce, Scott

Case opinions
- Decision by: Train
- Concurrence: Dawson, joined by Mulroney
- Dissent: Atkins, joined by Tietjens, Opper, Raum, Withey, Pierce, Scott

Laws applied
- Internal Revenue Code

Teschner v. Commissioner, 38 T.C. 1003 (1962) was a tax-law case involving the United States IRS in 1962.

== Key elements of the case ==
=== Facts ===
Taxpayer, Paul Teschner ("Paul"), entered a contest sponsored by Johnson & Johnson, Inc. for a youth scholarship. Any person in the United States or Canada could enter. Besides the standard entry form there was also a fifty word essay that had to be written with the entry. The prizes consisted of annuity policies in different amounts depending on the place you were awarded. The rules also stated that only persons under the age of 17 years and 1 month were eligible to receive the prizes. If someone entered that was over that age, they had to designate a person below the age of 17 on the entry form to be eligible to win. Paul entered the name of his seven-year-old daughter, Karen. Paul's entry was chosen and Karen received the prize for fourth place, $1,500. Paul and his wife, filing a joint return, did not include any amount in their 1957 income tax return with regard to the prize. Respondent, Commissioner, determined that the policy constituted gross income to the petitioners.

=== Issue ===
Whether the petitioners [taxpayer] are taxable on a prize receive by their daughter.

=== Analysis ===
Paul could not have, under any circumstances, received the income from the contest. He didn't have any right to its receipt or enjoyment. The only thing that Paul could do was designate another person to be the beneficiary of that right. In addition the payment to his daughter is not a discharge of any obligation. Nor can it be argued that Paul voluntarily gave up his right to the prize. There was no discretion on his part; the choice was to accept the terms of the contest or reject them.

The respondent, Commissioner, relies heavily on the case Helvering v. Horst especially the language of the opinion that "The power to dispose of income is the equivalent of ownership of it. The exercise of that power to procure the payment of income to another is the enjoyment, and hence the realization, of the income by him who exercises it." The reliance on this is misplaced. The power of disposition assumes possession or the right to possession. "To dispose is to part with". If there is no possession or the right to possession, there can be no disposition. Paul has not given away any right of theirs.

In addition the rule applicable to an anticipatory assignment of income does not apply because it only applies when the assignor is entitled at the time of the assignment to receive the income at the future date and is vested with such a right In this case, Paul was never entitled to receive the prize.

== Ruling ==
=== Holding ===
Reversed. The prize is not includible in the gross income of the taxpayer.

=== Dissent ===
It is well settled in United States income tax law that personal earnings are taxable to the earner. The annuity policy which Paul won resulted by his own efforts. He alone filled out the form and entered the contest. He also designated his daughter as the beneficiary. His efforts alone generated the income and it should not matter that the income would not be paid directly to him. By naming his daughter as the beneficiary, when she received the annuity it actually constituted the enjoyment and hence the realization of the income by Paul. As a result, the annuity should be considered income to the taxpayer.

== Impact of decision ==
A taxpayer, even if he performs a service, must have received the income or had a right to do so before he is taxable for that income. In other words, for the purposes of taxation, income is attributable to the person entitled to receive it.
