= United States v. Sprague =

- Supreme Court of the United States

Argued January 21, 1931 Decided February 24, 1931
- Full case name: United States v. Sprague et al.
- Citations: 282 U.S. 716 (more) 51 S. Ct. 220; 75 L. Ed. 640; 1931 U.S. LEXIS 39

Holding
- Congress has the authority to decide how constitutional amendments will be ratified in accordance with the options provided in Article Five.

Court membership
- Chief Justice Charles E. Hughes Associate Justices Oliver W. Holmes Jr. · Willis Van Devanter; James C. McReynolds · Louis Brandeis; George Sutherland · Pierce Butler; Harlan F. Stone · Owen Roberts

Case opinion
- Majority: Roberts, joined by Holmes, Devanter, McReynolds, Brandeis, Sutherland, Butler, Stone
- Hughes took no part in the consideration or decision of the case.

Laws applied
- U.S. Const. art. V

United States v. Sprague, 282 U.S. 716 (1931), was a United States Supreme Court case that dealt with the Fifth Article of the US Constitution. The defendants had been indicted under the National Prohibition Act and were attempting to quash their indictments, arguing that the Eighteenth Amendment had not been properly ratified. Their reasoning was that the Congress of the United States had chosen to ratify it by usage of state legislatures instead of constitutional conventions.

If this were held true, Congress would have exceeded its authority in passing the NPA. The court did not agree, however, ruling that the Constitution explicitly authorized Congress to determine the method used in ratifying amendments. In part, Article Five states that any amendment "shall be valid to all Intents and Purposes, as part of this Constitution, when ratified by the Legislatures of three-fourths of the several States, or by Conventions in three fourths thereof, as the one or the other Mode of Ratification may be proposed by the Congress" (emphasis added).

Furthermore, the court rejected the defendants' claim that the Eighteenth Amendment needed to be ratified by state conventions since "all [previous amendments] save the Eighteenth dealt solely with governmental means and machinery rather than with the rights of the individual citizen." The Constitution does not make a difference between types of amendments, the court held, so the amendment, "by lawful proposal and ratification, has become a part of the Constitution."
