= Kiddie tax =

American tax rule

The kiddie tax is a U.S. federal tax rule under Internal Revenue Code § 1(g) that applies to certain unearned income of children. It taxes a child’s investment and other passive income, such as interest, dividends, capital gains, rental income, royalties, and some pension or trust income — at their parents’ marginal income-tax rate, instead of at the child’s lower rate.

The rule was enacted by the Tax Reform Act of 1986 to prevent families from circumventing higher tax brackets by shifting investment income into a child’s name, given children often face lower tax rates.

== Background ==
The U.S. federal income tax, imposed in Internal Revenue Code section 1, is structured progressively: as taxable income rises, the marginal tax rate applied to additional income increases, so higher-income individuals pay a larger percentage of their income in tax. This progressivity aims to reflect taxpayers’ differing ability to pay and to provide a degree of income redistribution through the tax code.

Because marginal rates are higher for high-income earners, shifting income from a high-bracket taxpayer to someone taxed at a lower rate (e.g., a child with little or no other income) could substantially reduce a family’s overall tax burden. Such shifting, if unrestricted, would undercut the redistributive goal of a progressive tax system. Recognizing that incentive, Congress enacted a special rule under Internal Revenue Code § 1(g) requiring certain unearned income of children to be taxed at the parent’s marginal rate.

Thus, the “kiddie tax” exists as an anti-avoidance measure: it preserves the intended progressivity of the federal income-tax system while preventing families from exploiting lower child-income tax rates by shifting passive or investment income to children.

== History ==
The kiddie tax was enacted as part of the Tax Reform Act of 1986 and first applied to tax years beginning after December 31, 1986. The original rule was codified in Internal Revenue Code § 1(i) and applied only to children under age 14, primarily targeting parental attempts to shift investment income into a child’s lower tax bracket.

In 1990, the Omnibus Budget Reconciliation Act of 1990 redesignated the provision as IRC § 1(g). Later amendments expanded the scope of the rule:

- In 2006, Congress raised the age threshold to include dependents under age 18.
- In 2007, the Small Business and Work Opportunity Tax Act of 2007 further extended coverage to full-time students under age 24 who do not provide more than half of their support with earned income.

Major structural changes were enacted by the Tax Cuts and Jobs Act of 2017 (TCJA), which temporarily taxed a child’s unearned income using estate and trust tax brackets for tax years 2018 and 2019 — often resulting in higher taxes for affected families. The change generated significant criticism, particularly regarding its impact on survivors receiving military benefits.

In response, the SECURE Act of 2019 repealed the TCJA calculation and restored the use of parents’ marginal tax rates, retroactive to 2018. Beginning in 2020, the Kiddie Tax returned to its pre-TCJA framework.

== Eligibility ==
Under Internal Revenue Code § 1(g), the kiddie tax applies only to a child’s unearned income and only when specific age and support rules are met. A child is subject to the kiddie tax if any of the following conditions apply:

1. They are under age 18 at the end of the taxable year;
2. They are age 18, and their earned income does not exceed one-half of their support; or
3. They are a full-time student aged 19 to under 24, and their earned income does not exceed one-half of their support.

In addition, the kiddie tax applies only when all the following are true:

a. The child is required to file a tax return for the year;

b. At least one parent is alive at the end of the year; and

c. The child does not file a joint return.

The rule covers unearned income as defined under the tax code, including investment income, capital-gain distributions, interest, dividends, rents, royalties, and certain trust distributions. Earned income, defined in IRC § 911(d)(2), is not subject to the kiddie tax and is taxed at the child’s own rate.

To calculate the amount subject to the kiddie tax, IRC § 1(g)(4)(A) defines net unearned income as a child’s unearned income minus:

• the dependent standard deduction (or twice that amount in certain cases), or

• the dependent standard deduction plus related itemized deductions for production of that income.

Once net unearned income is determined, the tax on that amount is calculated using the parents’ marginal tax rate, under IRC § 1(g)(3)(A).

== Criticism ==
The Kiddie Tax has been criticized as unnecessarily complex. A 1989 critique by attorney Anthony P. Marshall argued that although the concept of taxing a child's unearned income at the parent's rate appeared straightforward, its implementation was "anything but simple" because of the detailed calculations required to determine allocable parental tax and related adjustments. This critique contended that the provision represented an extensive legislative response to a relatively limited tax-avoidance opportunity, characterizing it as "overkill", given the comparatively modest maximum tax benefit available through income shifting.

== See also ==
- Income tax in the United States
- Internal Revenue Code
- Internal Revenue Service
- Taxation in the United States
