= List of United States Supreme Court cases, volume 282 =

Supreme Court of the United States
- Interactive map of Supreme Court of the United States
- 38°53′26″N 77°00′16″W
- Established: March 4, 1789; 236 years ago
- Location: Washington, D.C.
- Coordinates: 38°53′26″N 77°00′16″W
- Composition method: Presidential nomination with Senate confirmation
- Authorised by: Constitution of the United States, Art. III, § 1
- Judge term length: life tenure, subject to impeachment and removal
- Number of positions: 9 (by statute)
- Website: supremecourt.gov

This is a list of cases reported in volume 282 of United States Reports, decided by the Supreme Court of the United States in 1930 and 1931.

== Justices of the Supreme Court at the time of volume 282 U.S. ==
The Supreme Court is established by Article III, Section 1 of the Constitution of the United States, which says: "The judicial Power of the United States, shall be vested in one supreme Court . . .". The size of the Court is not specified; the Constitution leaves it to Congress to set the number of justices. Under the Judiciary Act of 1789, Congress originally fixed the number of justices to six (one chief justice and five associate justices). Since 1789 Congress has varied the size of the Court from six to seven, nine, ten, and back to nine justices (always including one chief justice).

When the cases in volume 282 were decided the Court comprised the following nine members:

Portrait	Justice	Office	Home State	Succeeded	Date confirmed by the Senate (Vote)	Tenure on Supreme Court
	Charles Evans Hughes	Chief Justice	New York	William Howard Taft	February 13, 1930 (52–26)	February 24, 1930 – June 30, 1941 (Retired)
	Oliver Wendell Holmes Jr.	Associate Justice	Massachusetts	Horace Gray	December 4, 1902 (Acclamation)	December 8, 1902 – January 12, 1932 (Retired)
	Willis Van Devanter	Associate Justice	Wyoming	Edward Douglass White (as Associate Justice)	December 15, 1910 (Acclamation)	January 3, 1911 – June 2, 1937 (Retired)
	James Clark McReynolds	Associate Justice	Tennessee	Horace Harmon Lurton	August 29, 1914 (44–6)	October 12, 1914 – January 31, 1941 (Retired)
	Louis Brandeis	Associate Justice	Massachusetts	Joseph Rucker Lamar	June 1, 1916 (47–22)	June 5, 1916 – February 13, 1939 (Retired)
	George Sutherland	Associate Justice	Utah	John Hessin Clarke	September 5, 1922 (Acclamation)	October 2, 1922 – January 17, 1938 (Retired)
	Pierce Butler	Associate Justice	Minnesota	William R. Day	December 21, 1922 (61–8)	January 2, 1923 – November 16, 1939 (Died)
	Harlan F. Stone	Associate Justice	New York	Joseph McKenna	February 5, 1925 (71–6)	March 2, 1925 – July 2, 1941 (Continued as chief justice)
	Owen Roberts	Associate Justice	Pennsylvania	Edward Terry Sanford	May 20, 1930 (Acclamation)	June 2, 1930 – July 31, 1945 (Resigned)

== Federal court system ==
Under the Judiciary Act of 1789 the federal court structure at the time comprised District Courts, which had general trial jurisdiction; Circuit Courts, which had mixed trial and appellate (from the US District Courts) jurisdiction; and the United States Supreme Court, which had appellate jurisdiction over the federal District and Circuit courts—and for certain issues over state courts. The Supreme Court also had limited original jurisdiction (i.e., in which cases could be filed directly with the Supreme Court without first having been heard by a lower federal or state court). There were one or more federal District Courts and/or Circuit Courts in each state, territory, or other geographical region.

The Judiciary Act of 1891 created the United States Courts of Appeals and reassigned the jurisdiction of most routine appeals from the district and circuit courts to these appellate courts. The Act created nine new courts that were originally known as the "United States Circuit Courts of Appeals." The new courts had jurisdiction over most appeals of lower court decisions. The Supreme Court could review either legal issues that a court of appeals certified or decisions of court of appeals by writ of certiorari. On January 1, 1912, the effective date of the Judicial Code of 1911, the old Circuit Courts were abolished, with their remaining trial court jurisdiction transferred to the U.S. District Courts.

== List of cases in volume 282 U.S. ==
Case name	Citation	Opinion of the Court	Vote	Concurring opinion or statement	Dissenting opinion or statement	Procedural jurisdiction	Result
Beidler v. South Carolina Tax Commission	282 U.S. 1 (1930)	Hughes	9–0	brief statement by Holmes that he and Brandeis "acquiesce" in the decision	none	error to the South Carolina Supreme Court (S.C.)	judgment reversed, and cause remanded
Stratton, Secretary of State of Illinois, v. St. Louis Southwestern Railway Company	282 U.S. 10 (1930)	Hughes	9–0	none	none	appeal from the United States Court of Appeals for the Seventh Circuit (7th Cir.)	decree reversed, and cause remanded to the Circuit Court of Appeals with directions to dismiss the appeal to that court for want of jurisdiction
Klein v. Board of Tax Supervisors of Jefferson County, Kentucky	282 U.S. 19 (1930)	Holmes	9–0	none	none	appeal from the Kentucky Court of Appeals (Ky.)	judgment affirmed
Sherman v. United States	282 U.S. 25 (1930)	Holmes	9–0	none	none	certified questions from the United States Court of Appeals for the Ninth Circuit (9th Cir.)	judgment reversed
Paramount Famous Lasky Corporation v. United States	282 U.S. 30 (1930)	McReynolds	9–0	none	none	appeal from the United States District Court for the Southern District of New York (S.D.N.Y.)	decree affirmed
United States v. First National Pictures, Inc.	282 U.S. 44 (1930)	McReynolds	9–0	none	none	appeal from the United States District Court for the Southern District of New York (S.D.N.Y.)	decree reversed, and cause remanded
Crooks, Commissioner of Internal Revenue v. Harrelson	282 U.S. 55 (1930)	Sutherland	9–0	none	none	certiorari to the United States Court of Appeals for the Eighth Circuit (8th Cir.)	judgment affirmed
District of Columbia v. Colts	282 U.S. 63 (1930)	Sutherland	9–0	none	none	certiorari to the United States Court of Appeals for the District of Columbia (D.C. Cir.)	judgment affirmed
Beaumont, Sour Lake & Western Railway Company v. United States	282 U.S. 74 (1930)	Butler	9–0	none	none	appeals from the United States District Court for the Western District of Missouri (W.D. Mo.)	decrees affirmed
Aluminum Castings Company v. Routzahn, Collector of Internal Revenue	282 U.S. 92 (1930)	Stone	7–2	Sutherland (opinion, with which Roberts concurred)	McReynolds and Butler (joint opinion)	certiorari to the United States Court of Appeals for the Sixth Circuit (6th Cir.)	judgment affirmed
Poe, Collector of Internal Revenue v. Seaborn	282 U.S. 101 (1930)	Roberts	7-0[a] [b]	none	none	certified question from the United States Court of Appeals for the Ninth Circuit (9th Cir.)	judgment affirmed
Goodell, Collector of Internal Revenue v. Koch	282 U.S. 118 (1930)	Roberts	7-0[a] [b]	none	none	certified question from the United States Court of Appeals for the Ninth Circuit (9th Cir.)	judgment affirmed
Hopkins, Collector of Internal Revenue v. Bacon	282 U.S. 122 (1930)	Roberts	7-0[a] [b]	none	none	certiorari to the United States Court of Appeals for the Fifth Circuit (5th Cir.)	judgment affirmed
Bender, Collector of Internal Revenue v. Pfaff	282 U.S. 127 (1930)	Roberts	7-0[a] [b]	none	none	certiorari to the United States Court of Appeals for the Fifth Circuit (5th Cir.)	judgment affirmed
Smith v. Illinois Bell Telephone Company	282 U.S. 133 (1930)	Hughes	9–0	none	none	appeal from the United States District Court for the Northern District of Illinois (N.D. Ill.)	decree set aside, and cause remanded
Chicago, St. Paul, Minneapolis and Omaha Railway Company v. Holmberg	282 U.S. 162 (1930)	Stone	9–0	none	none	error to the Nebraska Supreme Court (Neb.)	judgment reversed, and cause remanded
Lektophone Corporation v. Rola Company	282 U.S. 168 (1930)	Holmes	8-0[a]	none	none	certiorari to the United States Court of Appeals for the Ninth Circuit (9th Cir.), and the United States Court of Appeals for the Third Circuit (3d Cir.)	one judgment affirmed; one judgment reversed
Wampler v. Lecompte	282 U.S. 172 (1930)	Brandeis	9–0	none	none	appeal from the Maryland Court of Appeals (Md.)	judgment affirmed
Powers-Kennedy Contracting Corporation v. Concrete Mixing and Conveying Company	282 U.S. 175 (1930)	Roberts	9–0	none	none	certiorari to the United States Court of Appeals for the Second Circuit (2d Cir.), and to the United States Court of Appeals for the Ninth Circuit (9th Cir.)	decree in one case reversed, and cause remanded; decree in one case affirmed
Broad River Power Company v. South Carolina ex rel. Daniel, Attorney General	282 U.S. 187 (1930)	per curiam	8-0[c]	VanDevanter, McReynolds, Sutherland, and Butler (joint opinion)	none	certiorari to the South Carolina Supreme Court (S.C.)	upon rehearing (see 281 U.S. 537), the Court adheres to the view that the writ of certiorari should be dismissed for want of jurisdiction
Florida v. United States	282 U.S. 194 (1931)	Hughes	9–0	none	none	appeals from the United States District Court for the Northern District of Georgia (N.D. Ga.)	decrees reversed
Willcutts, Collector of Internal Revenue v. Bunn	282 U.S. 216 (1931)	Hughes	9–0	none	none	certiorari to the United States Court of Appeals for the Eighth Circuit (8th Cir.)	judgment reversed
Uravic v. F. Jarka Company, Inc.	282 U.S. 234 (1931)	Holmes	9–0	none	none	certiorari to the New York Supreme Court (N.Y. Sup. Ct.)	judgment reversed
Memphis and Charleston Railway Company v. Pace	282 U.S. 241 (1931)	VanDevanter	9–0	none	none	appeal from the Mississippi Supreme Court (Miss.)	judgment affirmed
Wisconsin Railroad Commission v. Maxcy	282 U.S. 249 (1931)	McReynolds	9–0	none	none	appeal from the United States District Court for the Western District of Wisconsin (W.D. Wis.)	decree affirmed
O'Gorman and Young, Inc. v. Hartford Fire Insurance Company	282 U.S. 251 (1931)	Brandeis	5–4	none	VanDevanter, McReynolds, Sutherland, and Butler (joint opinion)	appeal from the New Jersey Court of Errors and Appeals (N.J.)	judgment affirmed
Stange v. United States	282 U.S. 270 (1931)	Brandeis	9–0	none	none	certiorari to the United States Court of Claims (Ct. Cl.)	judgment affirmed
Aiken v. Burnet, Commissioner of Internal Revenue	282 U.S. 277 (1931)	Brandeis	9–0	none	none	certiorari to the United States Court of Appeals for the Eighth Circuit (8th Cir.)	judgment affirmed
W.P. Brown and Sons Lumber Company v. Burnet, Commissioner of Internal Revenue	282 U.S. 283 (1931)	Brandeis	9–0	none	none	certiorari to the United States Court of Appeals for the Sixth Circuit (6th Cir.)	judgment affirmed
Burnet, Commissioner of Internal Revenue v. Chicago Railway Equipment Company	282 U.S. 295 (1931)	Brandeis	9–0	none	none	certiorari to the United States Court of Appeals for the Seventh Circuit (7th Cir.)	judgment reversed
United States v. Benz	282 U.S. 304 (1931)	Sutherland	9–0	none	none	certified question from the United States Court of Appeals for the Third Circuit (3d Cir.)	certified question answered
United States v. Chicago, Milwaukee, St. Paul and Pacific Railroad Company	282 U.S. 311 (1931)	Sutherland	5-3[a]	none	Stone (opinion; with which Holmes and Brandeis concurred)	appeal from the United States District Court for the Northern District of Illinois (N.D. Ill.)	decree affirmed
Go-Bart Importing Company v. United States	282 U.S. 344 (1931)	Butler	9–0	none	none	certiorari to the United States Court of Appeals for the Second Circuit (2d Cir.)	judgments reversed, and cause remanded to district court
Burnet, Commissioner of Internal Revenue v. Sanford and Brooks Company	282 U.S. 359 (1931)	Stone	9–0	none	none	certiorari to the United States Court of Appeals for the Fourth Circuit (4th Cir.)	judgment reversed
White v. Johnson	282 U.S. 367 (1931)	Roberts	9–0	none	none	certified questions from the United States Court of Appeals for the Seventh Circuit (7th Cir.)	certificate dismissed
American Bond and Mortgage Company v. United States	282 U.S. 374 (1931)	Roberts	9–0	none	none	certified question from the United States Court of Appeals for the Seventh Circuit (7th Cir.)	certificate dismissed
Fawcus Machine Company v. United States	282 U.S. 375 (1931)	Roberts	9–0	none	none	certiorari to the United States Court of Claims (Ct. Cl.)	judgment affirmed
Educational Films Corporation of America v. Ward, Attorney General of New York	282 U.S. 379 (1931)	Stone	6–3	none	Sutherland (opinion; joined by VanDevanter and Butler)	appeal from the United States District Court for the Southern District of New York (S.D.N.Y.)	judgment affirmed
International Paper Company v. United States	282 U.S. 399 (1931)	Holmes	6–3	none	McReynolds, Stone, and Roberts (without opinions)	certiorari to the United States Court of Claims (Ct. Cl.)	judgment reversed
Graham and Foster v. Goodcell	282 U.S. 409 (1931)	Hughes	9–0	none	none	certiorari to the United States Courts of Appeals for the Ninth, First, Second, and Sixth Circuits, and to the United States Court of Claims	judgments affirmed
Magee v. United States	282 U.S. 432 (1931)	Hughes	9–0	none	none	certiorari to the United States Court of Claims (Ct. Cl.)	judgment affirmed
Mascot Oil Company v. United States	282 U.S. 434 (1931)	Hughes	9–0	none	none	certiorari to the United States Court of Claims (Ct. Cl.), and to the United States Court of Appeals for the Third Circuit (3d Cir.)	judgment affirmed in one case; judgement reversed in two cases
Burnet, Commissioner of Internal Revenue v. Willingham Loan and Trust Company	282 U.S. 437 (1931)	Holmes	9–0	none	none	certiorari to the United States Court of Appeals for the Fifth Circuit (5th Cir.)	judgment reversed
Railway Express Agency, Inc. v. Virginia	282 U.S. 440 (1931)	Holmes	9–0	none	none	appeal from the Virginia Supreme Court (Va.)	judgment affirmed
Ensten v. Simon, Ascher and Company	282 U.S. 445 (1931)	McReynolds	9–0	none	none	certiorari to the United States Court of Appeals for the Second Circuit (2d Cir.)	judgment affirmed
Louisiana v. Mississippi	282 U.S. 458 (1931)	Roberts	9–0	none	none	original	commission appointed to locate the thread of the main channel of the Mississippi River as the same was immediately prior to the avulsion of 1912–13
United States v. Swift and Company	282 U.S. 468 (1931)	Roberts	9–0	none	none	certiorari to the United States Court of Claims (Ct. Cl.)	judgment affirmed
United States v. Boston Buick Company	282 U.S. 476 (1931)	Roberts	9–0	none	none	certiorari to the United States Court of Appeals for the First Circuit (1st Cir.)	judgments affirmed
Pottstown Iron Company v. United States	[ 282 U.S. 479 (1931)]	Roberts	9–0	none	none	certiorari to the United States Court of Claims (Ct. Cl.)	judgment affirmed
Russian Volunteer Fleet (Доброфлот) v. United States	282 U.S. 481 (1931)	Hughes	9–0	none	none	certiorari to the United States Court of Claims (Ct. Cl.)	judgment reversed
Furst and Thomas v. Brewster	282 U.S. 493 (1931)	Hughes	9–0	none	none	appeal from the Arkansas Supreme Court (Ark.)	We are of the opinion that the provisions of the statutes of Arkansas, as applied in this case, are in conflict with the commerce clause. Judgment reversed.
Bain Peanut Company of Texas v. Pinson	282 U.S. 499 (1931)	Holmes	9–0	none	none	appeal from the Texas Courts of Appeals (Tex. Civ. App.)	Order dismissing appeal vacated and judgment affirmed.
Alabama v. United States	282 U.S. 502 (1931)	Holmes	9–0	none	none	certiorari to the United States Court of Claims (Ct. Cl.)	judgment reversed; petition to be dismissed for want of jurisdiction
Waite v. United States	282 U.S. 508 (1931)	Holmes	9–0	none	none	certiorari to the United States Court of Claims (Ct. Cl.)	judgment reversed
Alward v. Johnson, Treasurer of California	282 U.S. 509 (1931)	McReynolds	9–0	none	none	certiorari to the California Supreme Court (Cal.)	judgment affirmed
Denman v. Slayton	282 U.S. 514 (1931)	McReynolds	9–0	none	none	certiorari to the United States Court of Appeals for the Sixth Circuit (6th Cir.)	judgment reversed
Fullerton Lumber Company v. Chicago, Milwaukee, St. Paul and Pacific Railroad Company	282 U.S. 520 (1931)	Brandeis	9–0	none	none	certiorari to the United States Court of Appeals for the Eighth Circuit (8th Cir.)	judgment reversed
United States v. Atlanta, Birmingham and Coast Railroad Company	282 U.S. 522 (1931)	Brandeis	9–0	none	none	appeal from the United States District Court for the Northern District of Georgia (N.D. Ga.)	judgment reversed
Langnes, owner of the fishing vessel "Aloha" v. Green	282 U.S. 531 (1931)	Sutherland	9–0	none	none	certiorari to the United States Court of Appeals for the Ninth Circuit (9th Cir.)	decrees reversed, and the cause remanded to the district court for further proceedings
Concordia Insurance Company of Milwaukee v. School District No. 98 of Payne County, Oklahoma	282 U.S. 545 (1931)	Sutherland	9–0	none	none	certiorari to the United States Court of Appeals for the Tenth Circuit (10th Cir.)	judgment affirmed
Story Parchment Company v. Paterson Parchment Paper Company	282 U.S. 555 (1931)	Sutherland	9–0	none	none	certiorari to the United States Court of Appeals for the First Circuit (1st Cir.)	judgment reversed
United States v. La Franca	282 U.S. 568 (1931)	Sutherland	9–0	none	none	certiorari to the United States Court of Appeals for the Fifth Circuit (5th Cir.)	judgment of the court of appeals affirmed, and cause remanded to the district court
Various Items of Personal Property v. United States	282 U.S. 577 (1931)	Sutherland	9–0	none	none	certiorari to the United States Court of Appeals for the Second Circuit (2d Cir.)	judgment affirmed
Coolidge v. Long, Commissioner of Corporations and Taxation of Massachusetts	282 U.S. 582 (1931)	Butler	5–4	none	Roberts (opinion; with which Holmes, Brandeis, and Stone concurred)	Norfolk County Probate Court (Norfolk Cnty. Prob. Ct.)	judgment reversed
V. Loewers Gambrinus Brewery Company v. Anderson	282 U.S. 638 (1931)	Butler	9–0	Stone (without opinion)	none	certiorari to the United States Court of Appeals for the Second Circuit (2d Cir.)	judgment reversed
Burnet, Commissioner of Internal Revenue v. National Industrial Alcohol Company, Inc.	282 U.S. 646 (1931)	Butler	9–0	none	none	certiorari to the United States Court of Appeals for the District of Columbia (D.C. Cir.)	judgment affirmed
Burnet, Commissioner of Internal Revenue v. Niagara Falls Brewing Company	282 U.S. 648 (1931)	Butler	9–0	none	none	certiorari to the United States Court of Appeals for the Second Circuit (2d Cir.)	judgment affirmed
United States v. Michel	282 U.S. 656 (1931)	Butler	9–0	none	none	certiorari to the United States Court of Appeals for the Second Circuit (2d Cir.)	judgments reversed
Connecticut v. Massachusetts	282 U.S. 660 (1931)	Butler	9–0	none	none	Original jurisdiction of the Supreme Court of the United States (original)	Connecticut's bill of complaint dismissed
Prussian v. United States	282 U.S. 675 (1931)	Stone	9–0	none	none	certiorari to the United States Court of Appeals for the Second Circuit (2d Cir.)	judgment affirmed
Oxford Paper Co. v. The Nidarholm	282 U.S. 681 (1931)	Stone	9–0	none	none	certiorari to the United States Court of Appeals for the First Circuit (1st Cir.)	judgment affirmed
Alford v. United States	282 U.S. 687 (1931)	Stone	9–0	none	none	certiorari to the United States Court of Appeals for the Ninth Circuit (9th Cir.)	judgment reversed
Husty v. United States	282 U.S. 694 (1931)	Stone	9–0	none	none	certiorari to the United States Court of Appeals for the Sixth Circuit (6th Cir.)	judgment reversed, and cause remanded to the district court
Saranac Automatic Machine Corporation v. Wirebounds Patents Company	282 U.S. 704 (1931)	Stone	9–0	none	none	certiorari to the United States Court of Appeals for the Sixth Circuit (6th Cir.)	judgment reversed
United States v. Sprague	282 U.S. 716 (1931)	Roberts	8-0[a]	none	none	appeal from the United States District Court for the District of New Jersey (D.N.J.)	order below reversed
Isaacs v. Hobbs Tie & Timber Company	282 U.S. 734 (1931)	Roberts	9–0	none	none	certified question from the United States Court of Appeals for the Eighth Circuit (8th Cir.)	judgment reversed, and cause remanded to district court
Louisville and Nashville Railroad Company v. United States	282 U.S. 740 (1931)	Hughes	7–2	none	McReynolds and Sutherland (without opinions)	appeal from the United States District Court for the Western District of Kentucky (W.D. Ky.)	decree affirmed
Kansas City Southern Railway Company v. United States	282 U.S. 760 (1931)	Hughes	9–0	none	none	appeal from the United States District Court for the Western District of Missouri (W.D. Mo.)	decree affirmed
Abie State Bank v. Bryan, Governor of Nebraska	282 U.S. 765 (1931)	Hughes	9–0	none	none	appeal from the Nebraska Supreme Court (Neb.)	judgment of the supreme court of the state denying an injunction affirmed
Smith v. Magic City Kennel Club, Inc.	282 U.S. 784 (1931)	Hughes	9–0	none	none	certiorari to the United States Court of Appeals for the Tenth Circuit (10th Cir.)	decree affirmed

[a] Hughes took no part in the case
[b] Stone took no part in the case
[c] Roberts took no part in the case
