= List of United States Supreme Court cases, volume 281 =

Supreme Court of the United States
- Interactive map of Supreme Court of the United States
- 38°53′26″N 77°00′16″W
- Established: March 4, 1789; 236 years ago
- Location: Washington, D.C.
- Coordinates: 38°53′26″N 77°00′16″W
- Composition method: Presidential nomination with Senate confirmation
- Authorised by: Constitution of the United States, Art. III, § 1
- Judge term length: life tenure, subject to impeachment and removal
- Number of positions: 9 (by statute)
- Website: supremecourt.gov

This is a list of cases reported in volume 281 of United States Reports, decided by the Supreme Court of the United States in 1930.

== Justices of the Supreme Court at the time of volume 281 U.S. ==
The Supreme Court is established by Article III, Section 1 of the Constitution of the United States, which says: "The judicial Power of the United States, shall be vested in one supreme Court . . .". The size of the Court is not specified; the Constitution leaves it to Congress to set the number of justices. Under the Judiciary Act of 1789 Congress originally fixed the number of justices at six (one chief justice and five associate justices). Since 1789 Congress has varied the size of the Court from six to seven, nine, ten, and back to nine justices (always including one chief justice).

When the cases in volume 281 were decided the Court comprised the following members (Chief Justice Taft retired in February 1930, and former Associate Justice Charles Evans Hughes rejoined the Court as Chief Justice the same month):

Portrait	Justice	Office	Home State	Succeeded	Date confirmed by the Senate (Vote)	Tenure on Supreme Court
	William Howard Taft	Chief Justice	Connecticut	Edward Douglass White	June 30, 1921 (Acclamation)	July 11, 1921 – February 3, 1930 (Retired)
	Charles Evans Hughes	Chief Justice	New York	William Howard Taft	February 13, 1930 (52–26)	February 24, 1930 – June 30, 1941 (Retired)
	Oliver Wendell Holmes Jr.	Associate Justice	Massachusetts	Horace Gray	December 4, 1902 (Acclamation)	December 8, 1902 – January 12, 1932 (Retired)
	Willis Van Devanter	Associate Justice	Wyoming	Edward Douglass White (as Associate Justice)	December 15, 1910 (Acclamation)	January 3, 1911 – June 2, 1937 (Retired)
	James Clark McReynolds	Associate Justice	Tennessee	Horace Harmon Lurton	August 29, 1914 (44–6)	October 12, 1914 – January 31, 1941 (Retired)
	Louis Brandeis	Associate Justice	Massachusetts	Joseph Rucker Lamar	June 1, 1916 (47–22)	June 5, 1916 – February 13, 1939 (Retired)
	George Sutherland	Associate Justice	Utah	John Hessin Clarke	September 5, 1922 (Acclamation)	October 2, 1922 – January 17, 1938 (Retired)
	Pierce Butler	Associate Justice	Minnesota	William R. Day	December 21, 1922 (61–8)	January 2, 1923 – November 16, 1939 (Died)
	Edward Terry Sanford	Associate Justice	Tennessee	Mahlon Pitney	January 29, 1923 (Acclamation)	February 19, 1923 – March 8, 1930 (Died)
	Harlan F. Stone	Associate Justice	New York	Joseph McKenna	February 5, 1925 (71–6)	March 2, 1925 – July 2, 1941 (Continued as chief justice)

== Federal court system ==
Under the Judiciary Act of 1789 the federal court structure at the time comprised District Courts, which had general trial jurisdiction; Circuit Courts, which had mixed trial and appellate (from the US District Courts) jurisdiction; and the United States Supreme Court, which had appellate jurisdiction over the federal District and Circuit courts—and for certain issues over state courts. The Supreme Court also had limited original jurisdiction (i.e., in which cases could be filed directly with the Supreme Court without first having been heard by a lower federal or state court). There were one or more federal District Courts and/or Circuit Courts in each state, territory, or other geographical region.

The Judiciary Act of 1891 created the United States Courts of Appeals and reassigned the jurisdiction of most routine appeals from the district and circuit courts to these appellate courts. The Act created nine new courts that were originally known as the "United States Circuit Courts of Appeals." The new courts had jurisdiction over most appeals of lower court decisions. The Supreme Court could review either legal issues that a court of appeals certified or decisions of court of appeals by writ of certiorari. On January 1, 1912, the effective date of the Judicial Code of 1911, the old Circuit Courts were abolished, with their remaining trial court jurisdiction transferred to the U.S. District Courts.

== List of cases in volume 281 U.S. ==
Case name	Citation	Opinion of the Court	Vote	Concurring opinion or statement	Dissenting opinion or statement	Procedural jurisdiction	Result
Kansas City Southern Railroad Company v. Guardian Trust Company	281 U.S. 1 (1930)	Butler	9–0	none	none	certiorari to the United States Court of Appeals for the Eighth Circuit (8th Cir.)	decree reversed
Lucas, Commissioner of Internal Revenue v. North Texas Lumber Company	281 U.S. 11 (1930)	Butler	9–0	none	none	certiorari to the United States Court of Appeals for the Fifth Circuit (5th Cir.)	judgment reversed
Chicago and North Western Railway Company v. Lindell	281 U.S. 14 (1930)	Butler	9–0	none	none	certified question from the United States Court of Appeals for the Ninth Circuit (9th Cir.)	certified question answered
Moore, Treasurer of Grant County, Indiana v. Mitchell	281 U.S. 18 (1930)	Butler	9–0	none	none	certiorari to the United States Court of Appeals for the Second Circuit (2d Cir.)	decree affirmed
District of Columbia v. Thompson	281 U.S. 25 (1930)	Sanford	9–0	none	none	certiorari to the United States Court of Appeals for the District of Columbia (D.C. Cir.)	judgment affirmed
United States Fidelity and Guaranty Company v. Guenther	281 U.S. 34 (1930)	Sanford	9–0	none	none	certiorari to the United States Court of Appeals for the Sixth Circuit (6th Cir.)	judgment reversed
Lindgren v. United States	281 U.S. 38 (1930)	Sanford	9–0	none	none	certiorari to the United States Court of Appeals for the Fourth Circuit (4th Cir.)	decree affirmed
District of Columbia v. Fred	281 U.S. 49 (1930)	Stone	9–0	none	none	certiorari to the United States Court of Appeals for the District of Columbia (D.C. Cir.)	judgment reversed
Collie v. Fergusson	281 U.S. 52 (1930)	Stone	9–0	none	none	certiorari to the United States Court of Appeals for the Fourth Circuit (4th Cir.)	decree affirmed as modified
Illinois Central Railroad Company v. Crail	281 U.S. 57 (1930)	Stone	9–0	none	none	certiorari to the United States Court of Appeals for the Eighth Circuit (8th Cir.)	judgment reversed
Carley and Hamilton, Inc. v. Snook	281 U.S. 66 (1930)	Stone	9–0	none	none	appeals from the United States District Court for the Northern District of California (N.D. Cal.)	judgments affirmed
Ohio ex rel. Bryant v. Akron Metropolitan Park District	281 U.S. 74 (1930)	Hughes	9–0	none	none	appeals from the Ohio Supreme Court (Ohio)	judgments affirmed
Railroad Commission of Wisconsin v. Maxcy	281 U.S. 82 (1930)	per curiam	9–0	none	none	appeal from the United States District Court for the Western District of Wisconsin (W.D. Wis.)	decree set aside
Early v. Federal Reserve Bank of Richmond	281 U.S. 84 (1930)	Holmes	9–0	none	none	certiorari to the United States Court of Appeals for the Fourth Circuit (4th Cir.)	judgment affirmed
Gunning v. Cooley	281 U.S. 90 (1930)	Butler	9–0	none	none	certiorari to the United States Court of Appeals for the District of Columbia (D.C. Cir.)	judgment affirmed
Staten Island Rapid Transit Railroad Company v. Phoenix Indemnity Company	281 U.S. 98 (1930)	Hughes	9–0	none	none	appeal from the New York Supreme Court (N.Y. Sup. Ct.)	judgment affirmed
Oklahoma v. Texas	281 U.S. 109 (1930)	per curiam	9–0	none	none	original	boundary set
Lucas, Commissioner of Internal Revenue v. Earl	281 U.S. 111 (1930)	Holmes	8-0[a]	none	none	certiorari to the United States Court of Appeals for the Ninth Circuit (9th Cir.)	judgment reversed
Lucas, Commissioner of Internal Revenue v. Ox Fibre Brush Company	281 U.S. 115 (1930)	Hughes	9–0	none	none	certiorari to the United States Court of Appeals for the Fourth Circuit (4th Cir.)	judgment affirmed
Henrietta Mills v. Rutherford County	281 U.S. 121 (1930)	Hughes	9–0	none	none	certiorari to the United States Court of Appeals for the Fourth Circuit (4th Cir.)	decree affirmed without prejudice to proceedings at law
Nogueira v. New York, New Haven and Hartford Railroad Company	281 U.S. 128 (1930)	Hughes	9–0	none	none	certiorari to the United States Court of Appeals for the Second Circuit (2d Cir.)	judgment affirmed
United States v. Unzeuta	281 U.S. 138 (1930)	Hughes	9–0	none	none	appeal from the United States District Court for the District of Nebraska (D. Neb.)	judgment reversed
Ohio Oil Company v. Conway, Supervisor of Public Accounts of Louisiana	281 U.S. 146 (1930)	Hughes	9–0	none	none	appeal from the United States District Court for the Eastern District of Louisiana (E.D. La.)	judgment affirmed
Kentucky v. Indiana	281 U.S. 163 (1930)	Hughes	9–0	none	none	original	dismissed as to individual defendants; decree for Kentucky against Indiana
Wisconsin v. Illinois	281 U.S. 179 (1930)	Holmes	8-0[a]	none	none	original	injunction against Illinois
United States v. Adams	281 U.S. 202 (1930)	Holmes	9–0	none	none	appeals from the United States District Court for the Eastern District of Arkansas (E.D. Ark.)	judgment affirmed in one case; judgment reversed in one case
Wilbur, Secretary of the Interior v. United States ex rel. Kadrie	281 U.S. 206 (1930)	VanDevanter	9–0	none	none	certiorari to the United States Court of Appeals for the District of Columbia (D.C. Cir.)	judgment reversed
John Baizley Iron Works v. Span	281 U.S. 222 (1930)	McReynolds	6–3	none	Stone (opinion; with which Holmes and Brandeis concurred)	appeal from the Pennsylvania Supreme Court (Pa.)	judgment reversed
Employers' Liability Assurance Corporation v. Cook	281 U.S. 233 (1930)	McReynolds	6–3	none	Stone (opinion; with which Holmes and Brandeis concurred)	certiorari to the United States Court of Appeals for the Fifth Circuit (5th Cir.)	judgment reversed, and cause remanded
May v. Heiner, Collector of Internal Revenue	281 U.S. 238 (1930)	McReynolds	9–0	none	none	certiorari to the United States Court of Appeals for the Third Circuit (3d Cir.)	judgment reversed, and cause remanded
Lucas, Collector of Internal Revenue v. Pilliod Lumber Company	281 U.S. 245 (1930)	McReynolds	9–0	none	none	certiorari to the United States Court of Appeals for the Sixth Circuit (6th Cir.)	judgment reversed
Alexander Sprunt and Son, Inc. v. United States	281 U.S. 249 (1930)	Brandeis	8-0[a]	none	none	appeal from the United States District Court for the Southern District of Texas (S.D. Tex. )	decree reversed with direction to dismiss
Miller v. McLaughlin, Secretary of the Department of Agriculture of Nebraska	281 U.S. 261 (1930)	Brandeis	9–0	none	none	certiorari to the Nebraska Supreme Court (Neb.)	judgment affirmed
Lucas, Commissioner of Internal Revenue v. Kansas City Structural Steel Company	281 U.S. 264 (1930)	Brandeis	8-0[a]	none	none	certiorari to the United States Court of Appeals for the Eighth Circuit (8th Cir.)	judgment reversed
Meadows v. United States	281 U.S. 271 (1930)	Sutherland	9–0	none	none	certiorari to the United States Court of Appeals for the Eighth Circuit (8th Cir.)	judgment affirmed
Patton v. United States	281 U.S. 276 (1930)	Sutherland	8-0[a]	Holmes, Brandeis, and Stone (without opinions)	none	certified question from the United States Court of Appeals for the Eighth Circuit (8th Cir.)	certified question answered
Missouri ex rel. Missouri Insurance Company v. Gehner, Assessor of the City of St. Louis	281 U.S. 313 (1930)	Butler	6–3	Hughes (short statement)	Stone (opinion; with which Holmes and Brandeis concurred)	appeal from the Missouri Supreme Court (Mo.)	judgment reversed
National Fire Insurance Company of Hartford v. Thompson, Superintendent of the Insurance Department of Missouri	281 U.S. 331 (1930)	Butler	9–0	none	none	appeal from the United States District Court for the Western District of Missouri (W.D. Mo.)	decree affirmed
United States v. Worley	281 U.S. 339 (1930)	Butler	9–0	none	none	certified questions from the United States Court of Appeals for the Eighth Circuit (8th Cir.)	certified questions answered
Jackson v. United States	281 U.S. 344 (1930)	Butler	9–0	none	none	certiorari to the United States Court of Appeals for the Tenth Circuit (10th Cir.)	judgment affirmed
New York Central Railroad Company v. Marcone	281 U.S. 345 (1930)	Stone	9–0	none	none	certiorari to the New Jersey Court of Errors and Appeals (N.J.)	judgment affirmed
Atchison, Topeka and Santa Fe Railroad Company v. Toops	281 U.S. 351 (1930)	Stone	9–0	none	none	certiorari to the Kansas Supreme Court (Kan.)	judgment reversed
Niles Bement Pond Company v. United States	281 U.S. 357 (1930)	Stone	9–0	none	none	certiorari to the United States Court of Claims (Ct. Cl.)	judgment affirmed
Dohany v. Rogers, State Highway Commissioner of Michigan	281 U.S. 362 (1930)	Stone	9–0	none	none	appeal from the United States District Court for the Eastern District of Michigan (E.D. Mich.)	decree affirmed
Cochran v. Louisiana Board of Education	281 U.S. 370 (1930)	Hughes	9–0	none	none	appeal from the Louisiana Supreme Court (La.)	judgment affirmed
Corliss v. Bowers, Collector of Internal Revenue	281 U.S. 376 (1930)	Holmes	8-0[a]	none	none	certiorari to the United States Court of Appeals for the Second Circuit (2d Cir.)	judgment affirmed
Escher v. Woods, Treasurer of the United States	281 U.S. 379 (1930)	Holmes	9–0	none	none	certiorari to the United States Court of Appeals for the District of Columbia (D.C. Cir.)	decree reversed
Chesapeake and Potomac Telephone Company v. United States	281 U.S. 385 (1930)	Holmes	8-0[b]	none	none	certiorari to the United States Court of Claims (Ct. Cl.)	judgment affirmed
Danovitz v. United States	281 U.S. 389 (1930)	Holmes	9–0	none	none	certiorari to the United States Court of Appeals for the Third Circuit (3d Cir.)	decree affirmed
Home Insurance Company v. Dick	281 U.S. 397 (1930)	Brandeis	9–0	none	none	appeal from the Texas Supreme Court (Tex.)	judgment reversed
Board of Railroad Commissioners of North Dakota v. Great Northern Railroad Company	281 U.S. 412 (1930)	Hughes	9–0	none	none	appeal from the United States District Court for the District of North Dakota (D.N.D.)	order reversed, and cause remanded
Corporation Commission of Oklahoma v. Lowe	281 U.S. 431 (1930)	Hughes	9–0	none	none	appeal from the United States District Court for the Western District of Oklahoma (W.D. Okla.)	decree reversed, and cause remanded
City of Cincinnati v. Vester	281 U.S. 439 (1930)	Hughes	9–0	none	none	certiorari to the United States Court of Appeals for the Sixth Circuit (6th Cir.)	decrees affirmed
Todok v. Union State Bank of Harvard	281 U.S. 449 (1930)	Hughes	9–0	none	none	certiorari to the Nebraska Supreme Court (Neb.)	judgment reversed
Eliason v. Wilborn	281 U.S. 457 (1930)	Holmes	9–0	none	none	appeal from the Illinois Supreme Court (Ill.)	decree affirmed
Barker Painting Company v. Brotherhood of Painters, Decorators and Paperhangers of America	281 U.S. 462 (1930)	Holmes	9–0	none	none	certiorari to the United States Court of Appeals for the Third Circuit (3d Cir.)	decree affirmed
Federal Radio Commission v. General Electric Company	281 U.S. 464 (1930)	VanDevanter	8-0[a]	none	none	certiorari to the United States Court of Appeals for the District of Columbia (D.C. Cir.)	writ of certiorari dismissed
Grubb v. Public Utilities Commission of Ohio	281 U.S. 470 (1930)	VanDevanter	9–0	none	none	appeal from the United States District Court for the Southern District of Ohio (S.D. Ohio)	decree affirmed
Pittsburgh and West Virginia Railway Company v. United States	281 U.S. 479 (1930)	Brandeis	9–0	none	none	appeal from the United States District Court for the Northern District of Ohio (N.D. Ohio)	decree affirmed
United States v. Updike	281 U.S. 489 (1930)	Sutherland	9–0	none	none	certiorari to the United States Court of Appeals for the Eighth Circuit (8th Cir.)	decree affirmed
Tyler v. United States	281 U.S. 497 (1930)	Sutherland	9–0	none	none	certiorari to the United States Court of Appeals for the Fourth Circuit (4th Cir.), and to the United States Court of Appeals for the Third Circuit (3d Cir.)	one judgment affirmed, two judgments reversed
Georgia Power Company v. City of Decatur	281 U.S. 505 (1930)	Butler	9–0	none	none	certiorari to the Georgia Supreme Court (Ga.)	decree affirmed
Western Cartridge Company v. Emmerson, Secretary of State of Illinois	281 U.S. 511 (1930)	Butler	9–0	none	none	certiorari to the Illinois Supreme Court (Ill.)	decree affirmed
Charter Shipping Company v. Bowring, Jones and Tidy, Ltd.	281 U.S. 515 (1930)	Stone	9–0	none	none	certiorari to the United States Court of Appeals for the Second Circuit (2d Cir.)	judgment reversed
United States Shipping Board Merchant Fleet Corporation v. Harwood	281 U.S. 519 (1930)	Stone	9–0	none	none	certiorari to the United States Court of Appeals for the Second Circuit (2d Cir.)	judgment affirmed
Richbourg Motor Company v. United States	281 U.S. 528 (1930)	Stone	9–0	none	none	certiorari to the United States Court of Appeals for the Fourth Circuit (4th Cir.), and to the United States Court of Appeals for the Ninth Circuit (9th Cir.)	judgment reversed
Broad River Power Company v. South Carolina ex rel. Daniel	281 U.S. 537 (1930)	Stone	9–0	none	none	certiorari to the South Carolina Supreme Court (S.C.)	dismissed
Texas and New Orleans Railroad Company v. Brotherhood of Railway and Steamship Clerks	281 U.S. 548 (1930)	Hughes	8-0[c]	none	none	certiorari to the United States Court of Appeals for the Fifth Circuit (5th Cir.)	decree affirmed
Wheeler Lumber Bridge and Supply Company v. United States	281 U.S. 572 (1930)	VanDevanter	9–0	none	none	certified question from the United States Court of Claims (Ct. Cl.)	certified question answered
Universal Battery Company v. United States	281 U.S. 580 (1930)	VanDevanter	9–0	none	none	certiorari to the United States Court of Claims (Ct. Cl.)	three judgments affirmed; two judgments reversed and remanded
Baldwin v. Missouri	281 U.S. 586 (1930)	McReynolds	6–3	none	Holmes (opinion; with which Brandeis and Stone agreed); Stone (opinion; joined by Holmes and Brandeis)	appeal from the Missouri Supreme Court (Mo.)	judgment reversed, and cause remanded
Campbell, Federal Prohibition Administrator v. Galeno Chemical Company	281 U.S. 599 (1930)	Brandeis	9–0	none	none	certiorari to the United States Court of Appeals for the Second Circuit (2d Cir.)	judgment affirmed
Campbell, Federal Prohibition Administrator v. W.H. Long and Company	281 U.S. 610 (1930)	Brandeis	9–0	none	none	certiorari to the United States Court of Appeals for the Second Circuit (2d Cir.), and to the United States Court of Appeals for the Third Circuit (3d Cir.)	multiple
United States v. Norris	281 U.S. 619 (1930)	Sutherland	9–0	none	none	certiorari to the United States Court of Appeals for the Third Circuit (3d Cir.)	judgment reversed
United States v. Farrar	281 U.S. 624 (1930)	Sutherland	9–0	none	none	appeal from the United States District Court for the District of Massachusetts (D. Mass.)	judgment affirmed
Jamison v. Encarnacion	281 U.S. 635 (1930)	Butler	9–0	none	none	certiorari to the New York Supreme Court (N.Y. Sup. Ct.)	judgment affirmed
Alpha Steamship Corporation v. Cain	281 U.S. 642 (1930)	Butler	9–0	none	none	certiorari to the United States Court of Appeals for the Second Circuit (2d Cir.)	judgment affirmed
Toombs v. Citizens Bank of Waynesboro	281 U.S. 643 (1930)	Stone	9–0	none	none	appeal from the Georgia Supreme Court (Ga.)	judgment affirmed
Surplus Trading Company v. Cook	281 U.S. 647 (1930)	VanDevanter	9–0	none	none	error to the Arkansas Supreme Court (Ark.)	judgment reversed, and cause remanded
Ann Arbor Railroad Company v. United States	281 U.S. 658 (1930)	VanDevanter	9–0	none	none	appeal from the United States District Court for the Northern District of California (N.D. Cal.)	decree reversed
Panama Mail Steamship Company v. Vargas	281 U.S. 670 (1930)	VanDevanter	9–0	none	none	certiorari to the United States Court of Appeals for the Ninth Circuit (9th Cir.)	decrees vacated, and cause remanded
Brinkerhoff-Faris Trust and Savings Company v. Hill, Treasurer of Henry County, Missouri	281 U.S. 673 (1930)	Brandeis	8-0[c]	none	none	certiorari to the Missouri Supreme Court (Mo.)	judgment reversed, and case remanded
New Orleans Public Service, Inc. v. City of New Orleans	281 U.S. 682 (1930)	Butler	9–0	none	none	appeal from the Louisiana Supreme Court (La.)	decree affirmed

[a] Hughes took no part in the case
[b] Stone took no part in the case
[c] McReynolds took no part in the case
