= Revenue Act of 1948 =

The United States Revenue Act of 1948 (also called the 1948 Tax Reduction Law) was a tax law passed by a two-thirds vote of the US Congress in 1948 over the veto of President Harry S. Truman. The act:

- Reduced individual income tax rates by 12.6% for incomes of $4000 or lower, 7.4% for incomes between $4000–$100,000, and 5% for incomes over $100,000.
- Increased the personal exemption, and the exemption for dependents, to $600.
- Granted an additional $600 personal exemption to taxpayers over 65.
- Permitted married couples to split their incomes for tax purposes, thus allowing both to potentially fall into lower tax brackets, under the community property jurisdictions. This also included taxes on gifts and estates.

Truman had previously vetoed several Republican-proposed bills cutting taxes in 1947, but several concessions in the 1948 Revenue Act (such as the personal exemption increase), as well as a projected budget surplus, made the bill more amenable to Democratic members of Congress. Although Truman also vetoed the Revenue Act, the veto was overridden only three hours later.
