= United States passport =

Passports issued to U.S. nationals

- The front cover of a regular United States biometric passport (with chip)

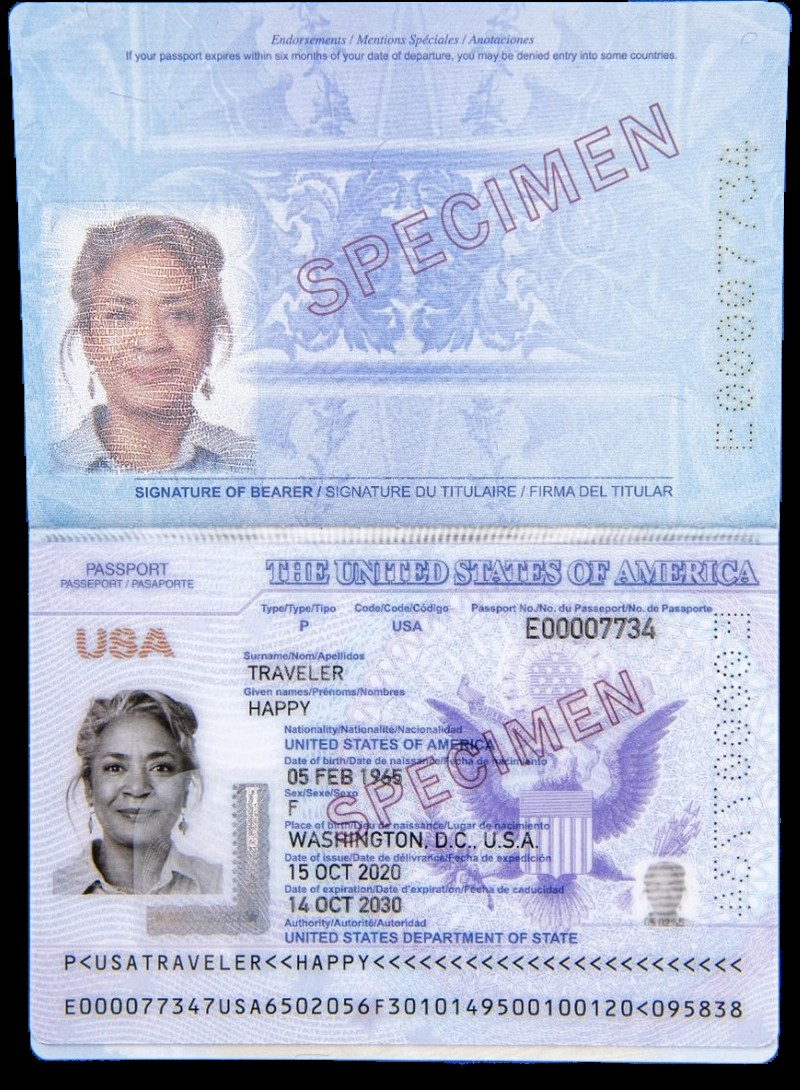
- The polycarbonate data page and the endorsement/signature page of a next-generation U.S. passport (NGP)
- Type: Passport
- Issued by: Department of State
- First issued: 1775 (first version); 1926 (booklet); 1981 (machine-readable passport); December 30, 2005 (diplomatic biometric passport booklet); 2006 (regular biometric passport booklet); 2021 (next generation passport booklet)
- In circulation: 183 million (2025)
- Purpose: Identification
- Valid in: All countries except North Korea (Note: Only Valid for travel if the trip is in the "national interest", this includes "compelling" humanitarian reasons and "...to make information about the DPRK available to the public")
- Eligibility: United States nationality
- Expiration: Normally 10 years after acquisition for people at least age 16; 5 years for minors under 16
- Cost: Booklet: $165 (first), $130 (renewal), $135 (minors); Card: $65 (first), $30 (when applying for or holder of a valid passport booklet), $30 (renewal), $50 (minor), $15 (minor, when applying for passport booklet)
- Website: travel.state.gov/content/travel/en/passports.html/

United States passports are passports issued to citizens and non-citizen nationals of the United States of America. They are issued exclusively by the U.S. Department of State. Besides passports (in booklet form), limited-use passport cards are issued subject to the same requirements. It is unlawful for US citizens and nationals to enter or exit the country without a valid US passport or passport-replacement document compliant with the Western Hemisphere Travel Initiative, though there are many exceptions; waivers are generally granted for U.S. citizens returning without a passport, and the exit requirement is not enforced. As of 2026, a United States passport allows visa-free travel to 179 countries and territories, being ranked as the tenth most powerful in the world in terms of travel freedom per the Henley Passport Index.

U.S. passport booklets conform with recommended standards (i.e. size, composition, layout, technology) of the International Civil Aviation Organization (ICAO). There are five types of passport booklets; the State Department has issued only biometric passports since August 2007. US passports are federal property and must be returned upon demand.

By law, a valid unexpired U.S. passport (or passport card) is conclusive (and not just prima facie) proof of U.S. citizenship, with the same force and effect as proof as certificates of naturalization or citizenship if issued to a U.S. citizen for the full period allowed by law. U.S. law does not prohibit its citizens from also holding passports of other countries.

== History ==
=== Early passports ===
American consular officials issued passports to some citizens of some of the thirteen states during the American Revolutionary War (1775–1783). Passports were sheets of paper printed on one side, included a description of the bearer, and were valid for three to six months. The minister to France, Benjamin Franklin, based the design of passports issued by his mission on that of the French passport.

From 1776 to 1783, no state government had a passport requirement. The Articles of Confederation government (1783–1789) did not have a passport requirement.

The Department of Foreign Affairs of the war period also issued passports, and the department, carried over by the Articles of Confederation government (1783–1789), continued to issue passports. In July 1789, the Department of Foreign Affairs was carried over by the government established under the Constitution. In September of that year, the name of the department was changed to Department of State. The department handled foreign relations and issued passports, and until the mid-19th century had various domestic duties.

For decades thereafter, passports were issued not only by the Department of State but also by states and cities, and by notaries public. For example, an internal passport dated 1815 was presented to Massachusetts citizen George Barker to allow him to travel as a free black man to visit relatives in Southern slave states. Passports issued by American authorities other than the Department of State breached propriety and caused confusion abroad. Some European countries refused to recognize passports not issued by the Department of State, unless United States consular officials endorsed them. The problems led the Congress in 1856 to give the Department of State the sole authority to issue passports. (Note: However, pursuant to the Dred Scott decision, the Secretary of State refused a passport to a black man in Massachusetts, John Rock, on grounds that, being black, he was not a United States citizen, and the Commonwealth of Massachusetts issued him a passport describing him as a citizen of the Commonwealth, and he used it to travel to Europe.)

From 1789 through late 1941, the federal government required passports of citizens only during two periods: during the American Civil War (1861–1865), as well as during and shortly after World War I (1914–1918). The passport requirement of the Civil War era lacked statutory authority. During World War I (1914–1918), European countries instituted passport requirements. The Travel Control Act of May 22, 1918, permitted the president, when the United States was at war, to proclaim a passport requirement, and President Wilson issued such a proclamation on August 18, 1918. World War I ended on November 11, 1918, but the passport requirement lingered until March 3, 1921, the last day of the Wilson administration.

In Europe, general peace between the end of the Napoleonic Wars (1815) and the beginning of World War I (1914), and the development of railroads, gave rise to international travel by large numbers of people. Countries such as the Russian Empire and the Ottoman Empire maintained passport requirements. After World War I, many European countries retained their passport requirements. Foreign passport requirements undercut the absence of a passport requirement under US law for Americans exiting the country between 1921 and 1941.

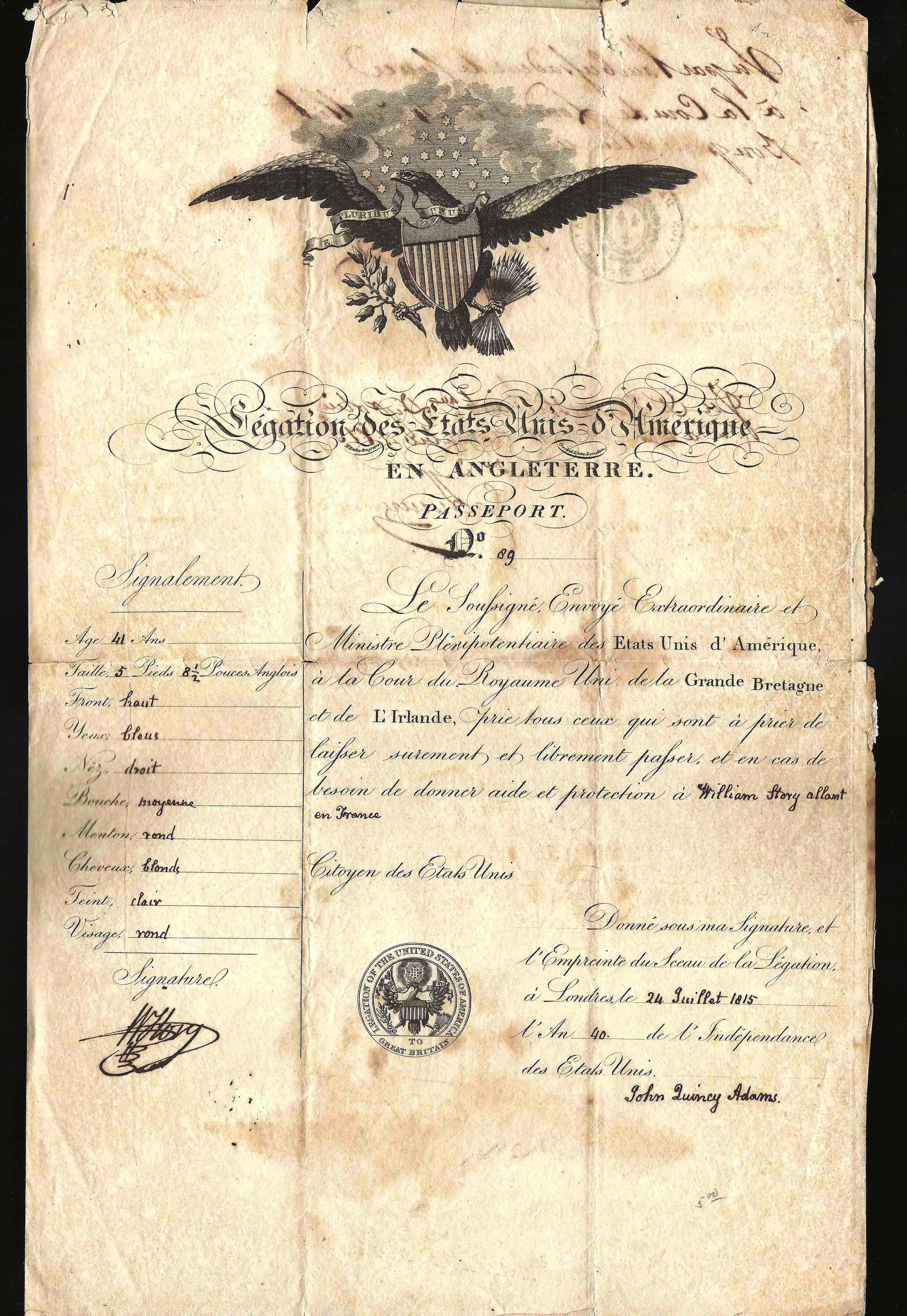
A US passport issued by John Quincy Adams at London in 1815

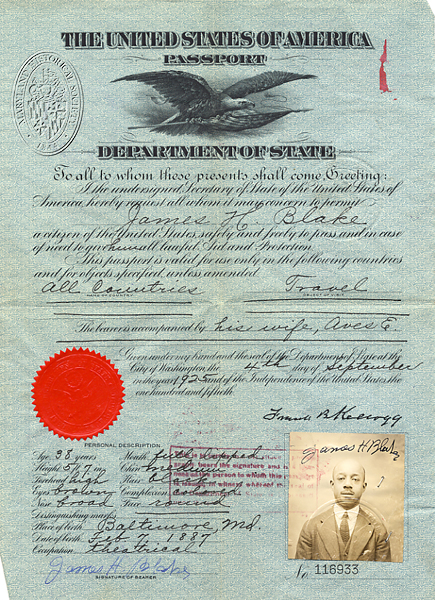
U.S. passport issued to James H. Blake and his wife, Aves E., passport no. 116933, dated September 4, 1925. The passport gives the couple permission for travel to all countries.

=== Contemporary passports ===
The contemporary period of required passports for Americans under United States law began on November 29, 1941. A 1978 amendment to the Immigration and Nationality Act of 1952 made it unlawful to enter or depart the United States without an issued passport even in peacetime.

Even when passports were not usually required, Americans requested them. Records of the Department of State show that 130,360 passports were issued between 1810 and 1873 and that 369,844 passports were issued between 1877 and 1909. Some of those passports were family passports or group passports. A passport application could cover, variously, a wife, a child, or children, one or more servants, or a woman traveling under the protection of a man. The passport would be issued to the man. Similarly, a passport application could cover a child traveling with their mother. The passport would be issued to the mother. The number of Americans who traveled without passports is unknown.

The League of Nations held a conference in 1920 concerning passports and through-train travel, and conferences in 1926 and 1927 concerning passports. The 1920 conference put forward guidelines on the layout and features of passports, which the 1926 and 1927 conferences followed up. Those guidelines were steps in the shaping of contemporary passports. One of the guidelines was about 32-page passport booklets, such as the U.S. type III mentioned in this section, below. Another guideline was about languages in passports. A conference on travel and tourism held by the United Nations in 1963 did not result in standardized passports. Passport standardization was accomplished in 1980 under the auspices of the International Civil Aviation Organization.

The design and contents of U.S. passports has changed over the years. Prior to World War I the passport was typically a large (11 in × 17 in / 28 cm × 43 cm) diploma, with a large engraved seal of the Department of State at the top, repeated in red wax at the bottom, the bearer's description and signature on the left, and his name on the right above space for data such as "accompanied by his wife," all in ornate script. In 1926, the Department of State introduced the type III passport. This had a stiff red cover, with a window cut-out through which the passport number was visible. That style of passport contained 32 pages.

Initially, a U.S. passport was issued for two years, although by the 1950s on application by the holder a passport could be stamped so that this time was extended without reissue. Stamping for a further extension is not permitted at present. In the succeeding decades the periods of validity for adult applicants were gradually extended to three, five, and eventually ten years, the current standard.

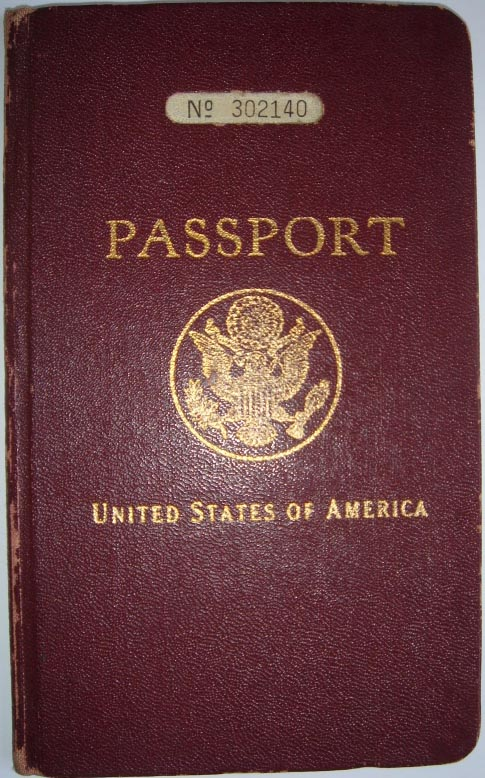
Cover of a passport (1930)

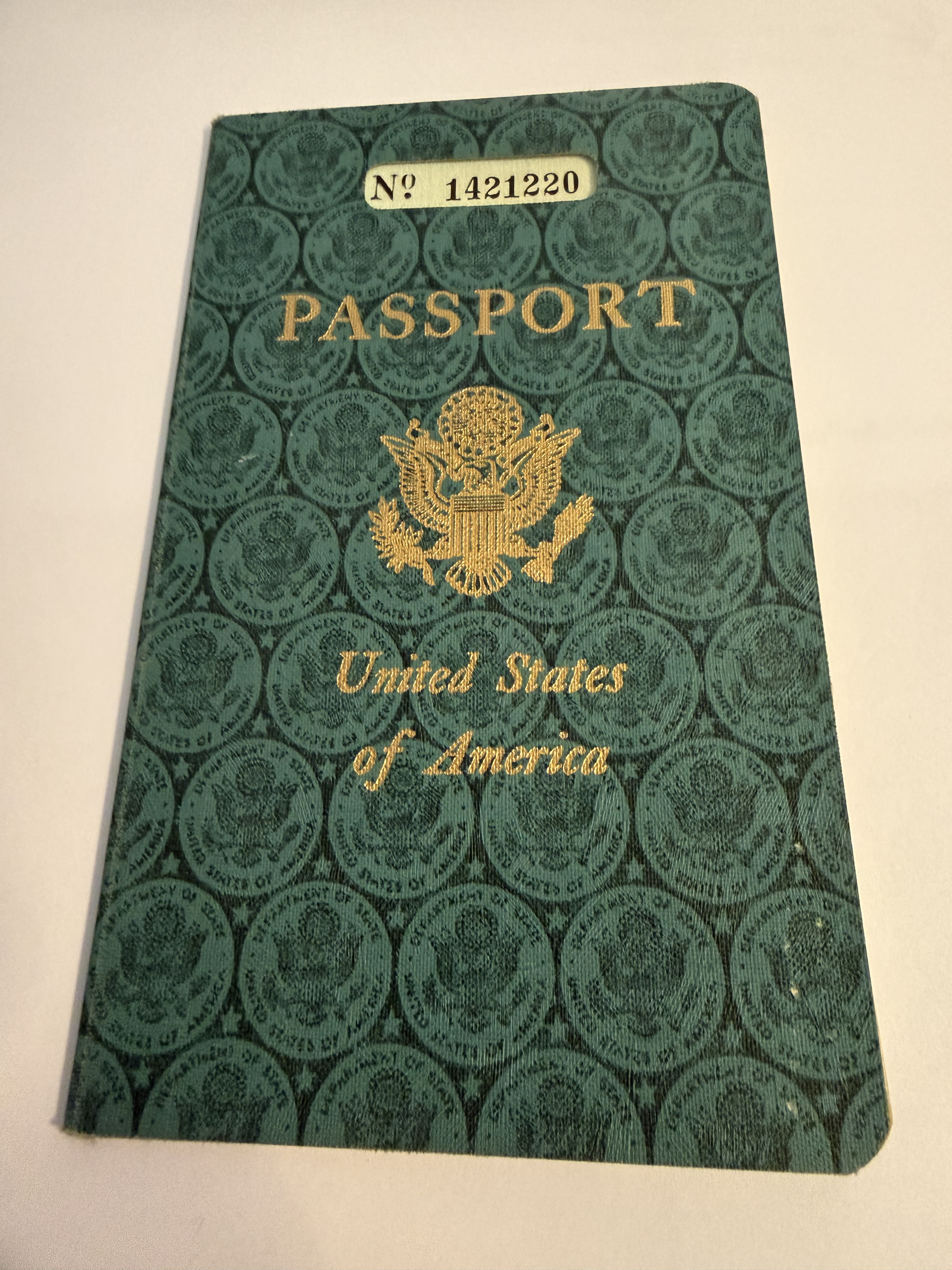
A US passport issued in 1959

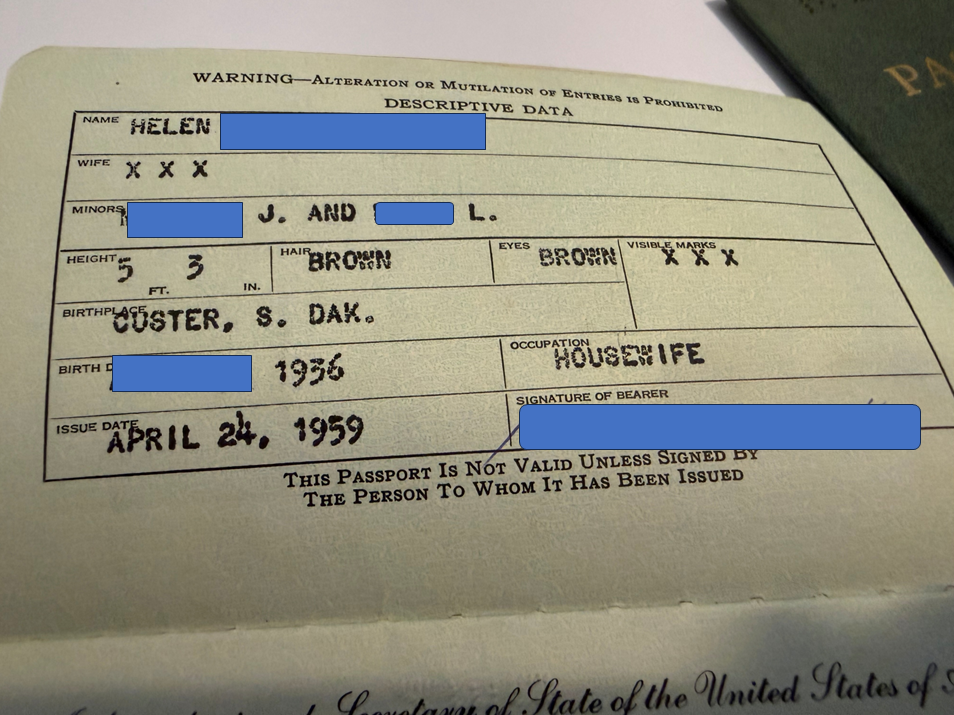
A US passport issued in 1959 showing children could travel on a parental passport

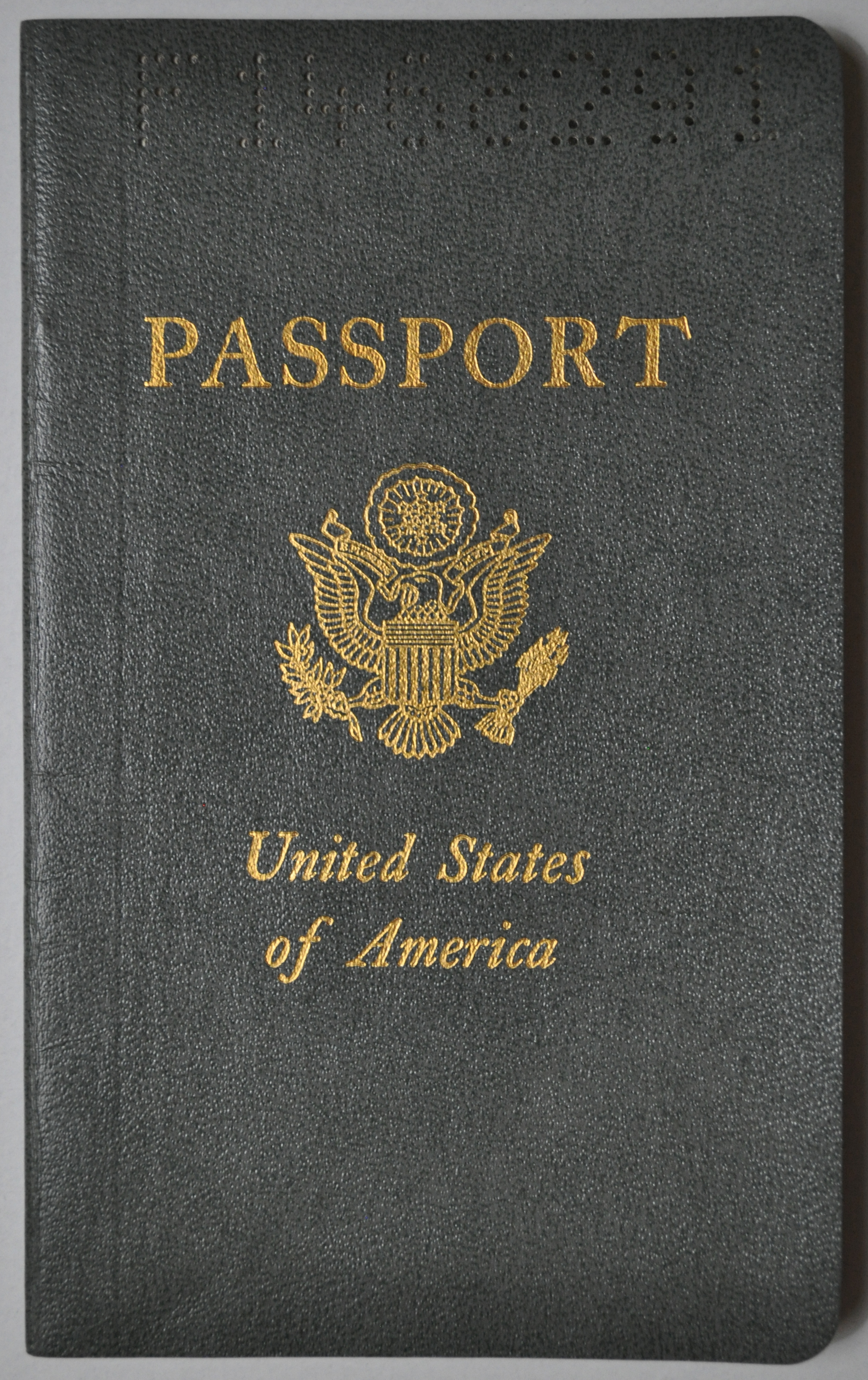
A US passport issued in 1975

=== Machine-readable passports ===
In 1981, the United States became the first country to introduce machine-readable passports (MRPs), following standards set by the International Civil Aviation Organization (ICAO). These passports featured an identity page with data encoded in an optical character recognition format to speed up processing and deter fraud.

As of 2010, all previous series have expired.

Machine readable passport designs from 1981 to 2000

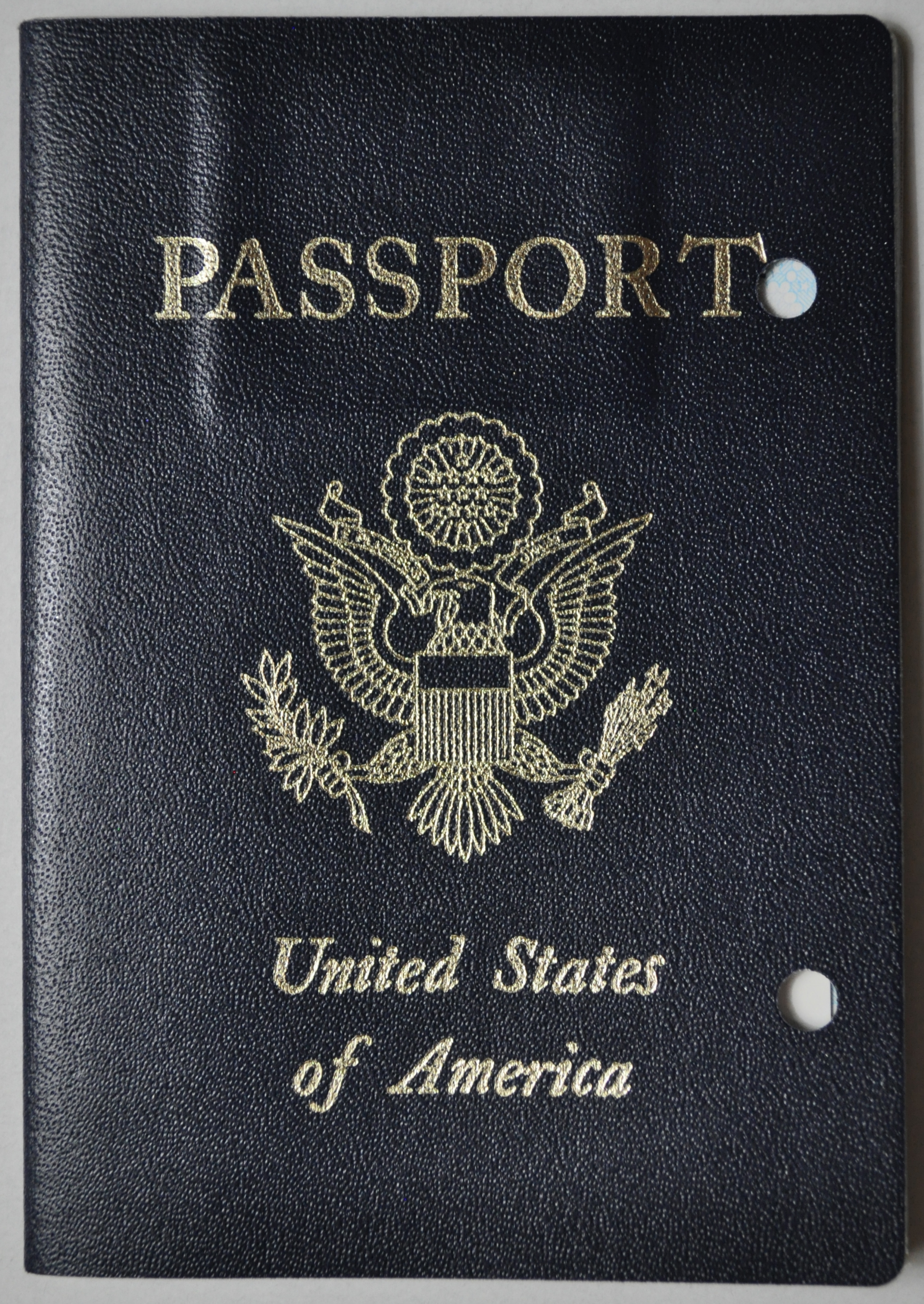
Cover of a machine readable US passport issued in 1997

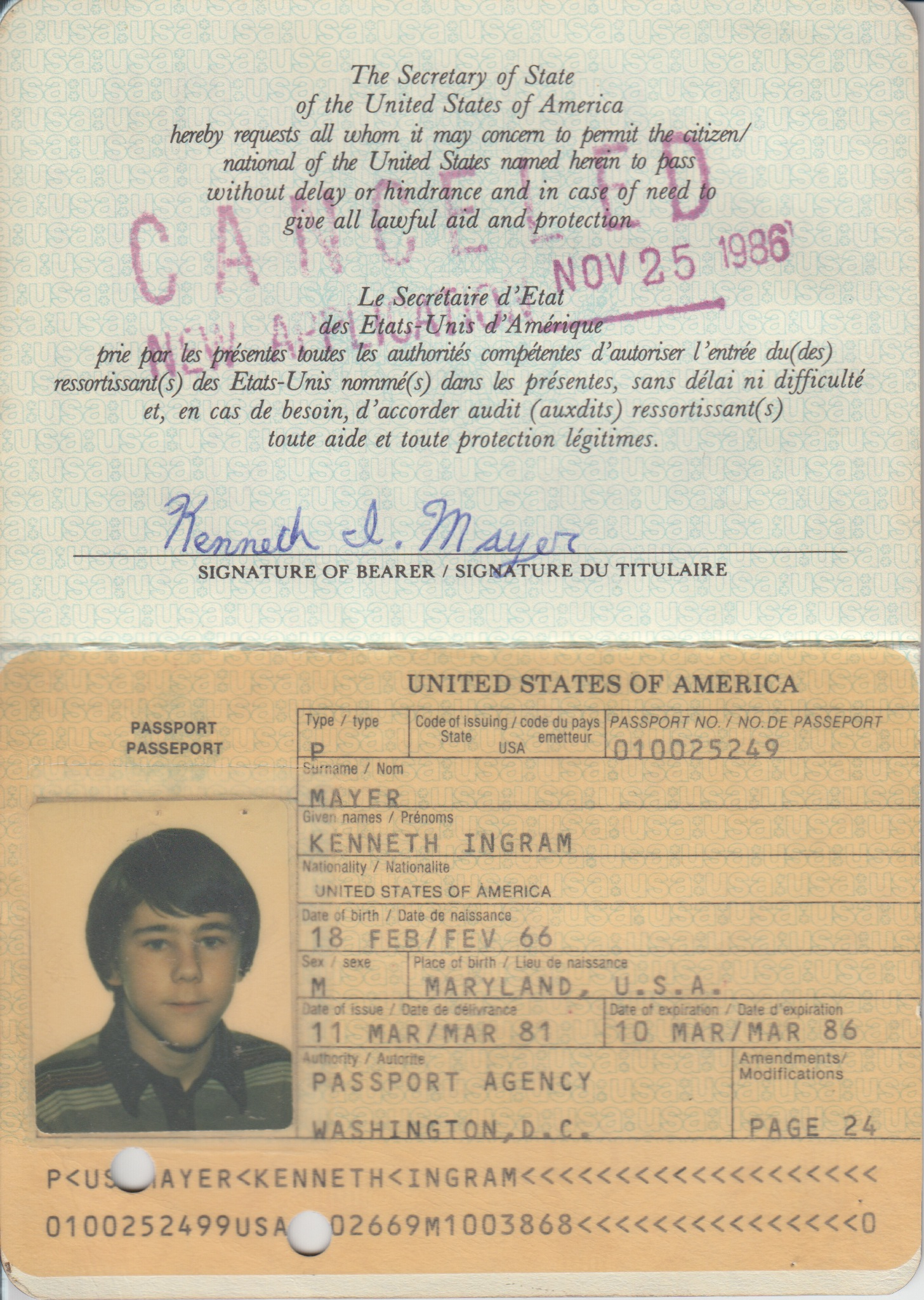
Signature page and data page of a machine readable United States passport issued in 1981

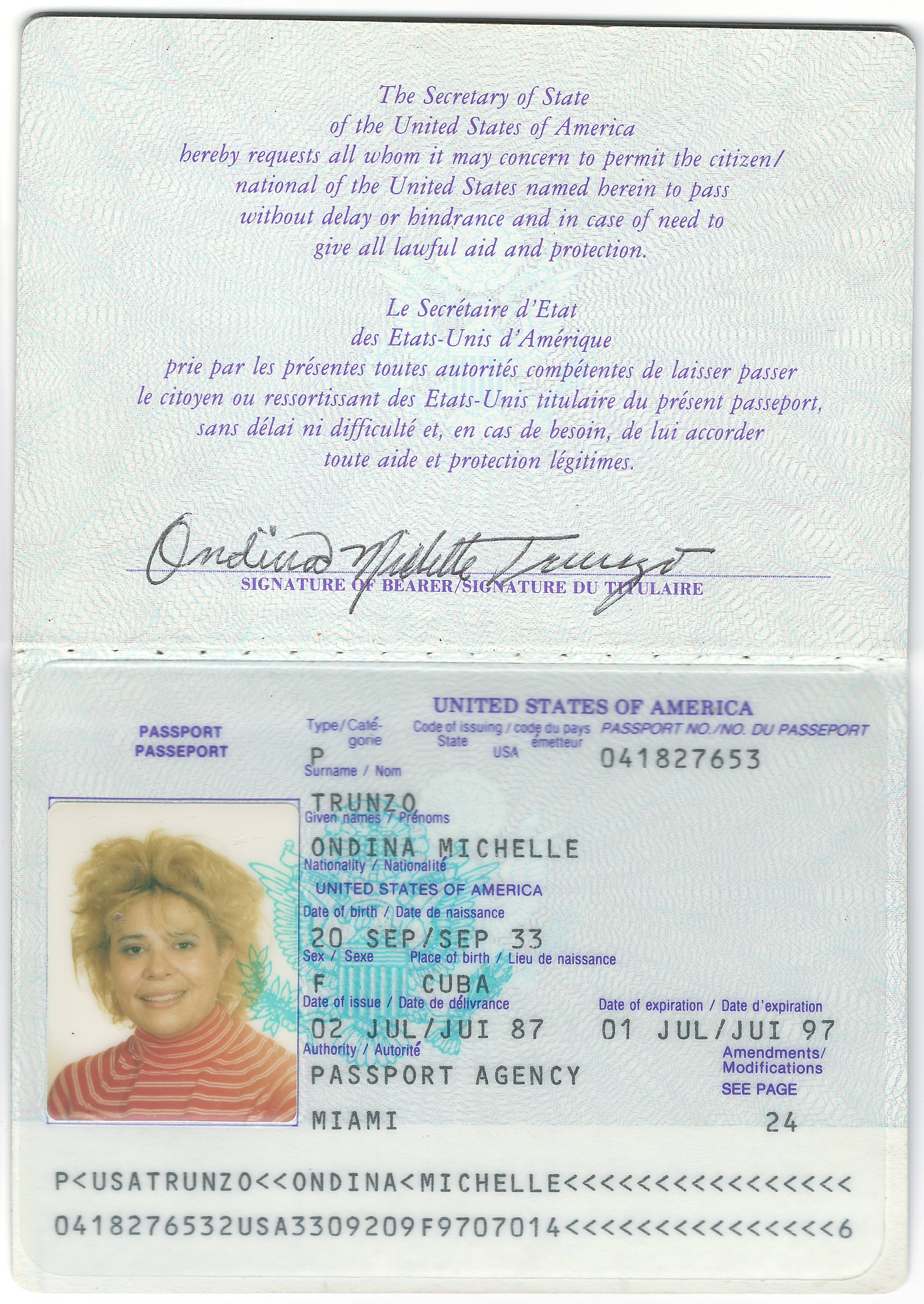
Signature page and data page of a machine readable United States passport issued to Ondina Trunzo in 1987

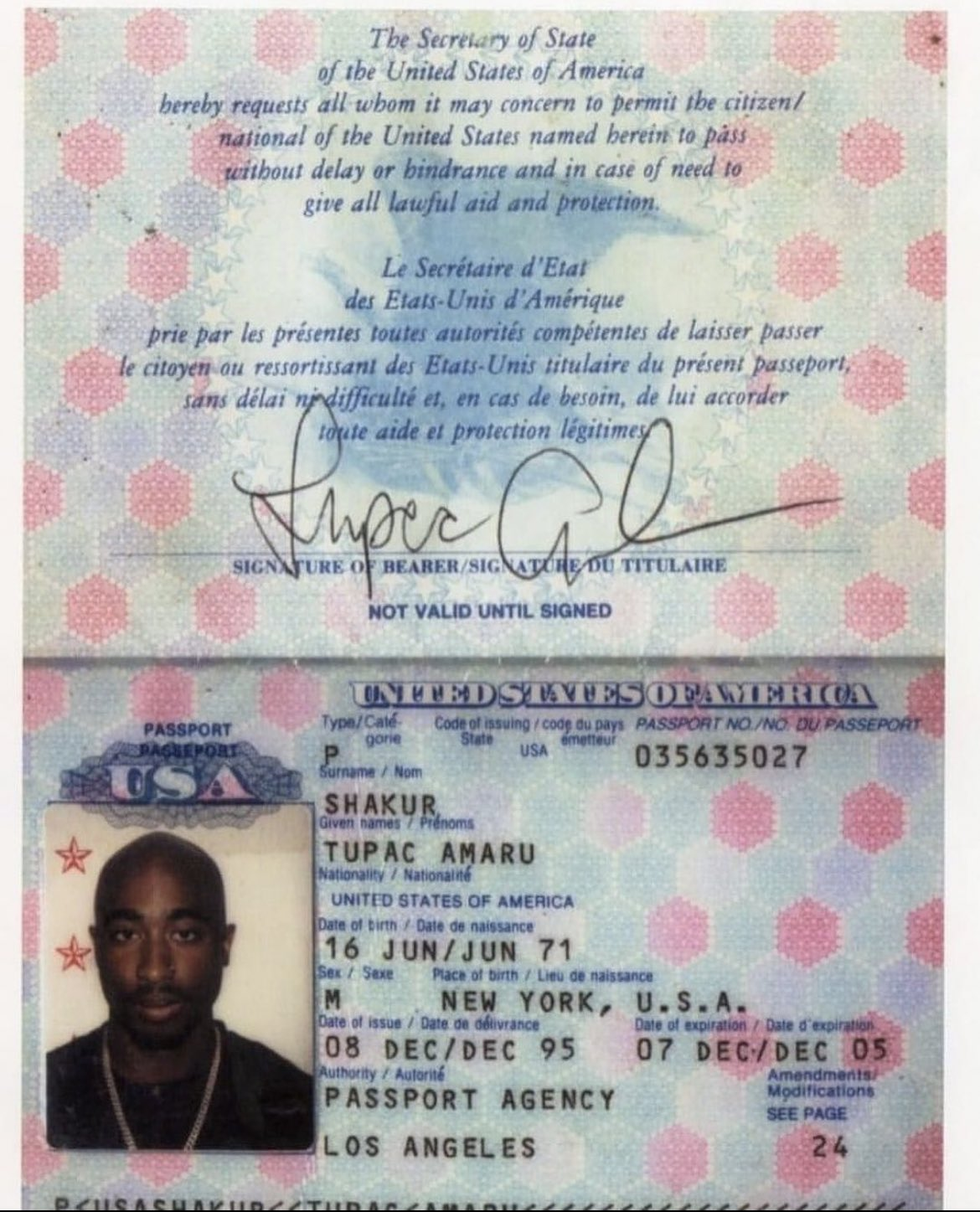
Signature page and data page of a machine readable United States passport issued to Tupac Shakur in 1995

==== 2000 update ====
On November 16, 1998, the Department of State introduced a major technology shift by issuing the first passports with digitized photos. Instead of gluing a physical photograph to the page, the image was printed directly onto the data page using computer-generated imaging to prevent "photo-substitution."

In 2000, passports with digital photos started to be issued, where the photograph was printed directly onto the page rather than being glued or laminated.

This was the final machine-readable U.S. passport with a non-biometric design; it continued to be issued until 2006–2007, when it was replaced by the first biometric U.S. passport edition. All U.S. passports issued after which, with the exception of few categories such as emergency passports, have been designed as e-passports.

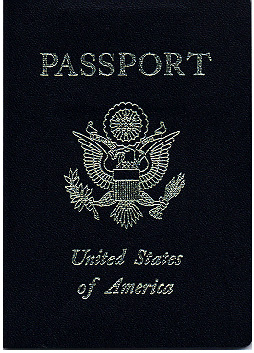
Cover of a non-biometric passport issued prior to August 2007

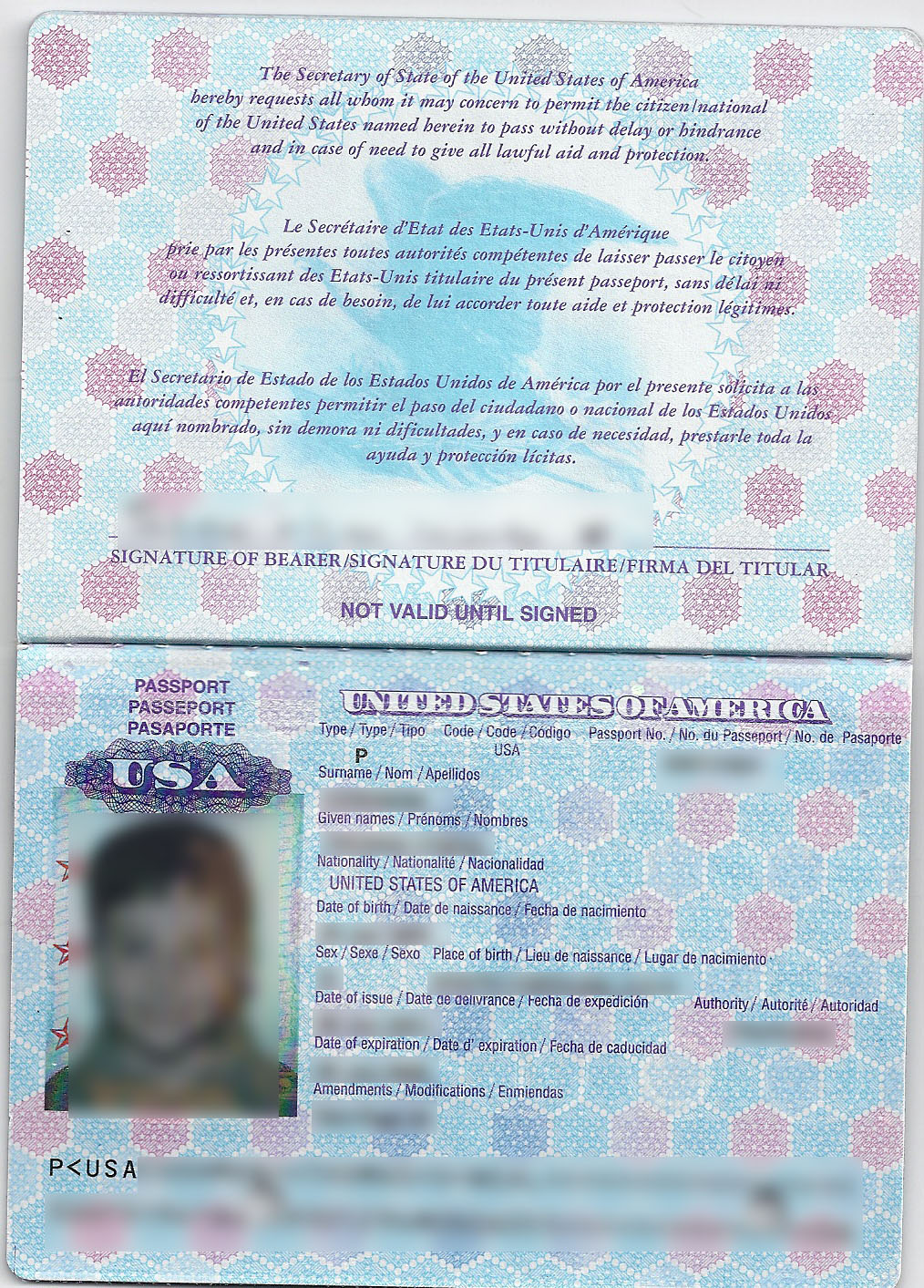
Signature page and data page of a non-biometric United States passport (pre-2007)

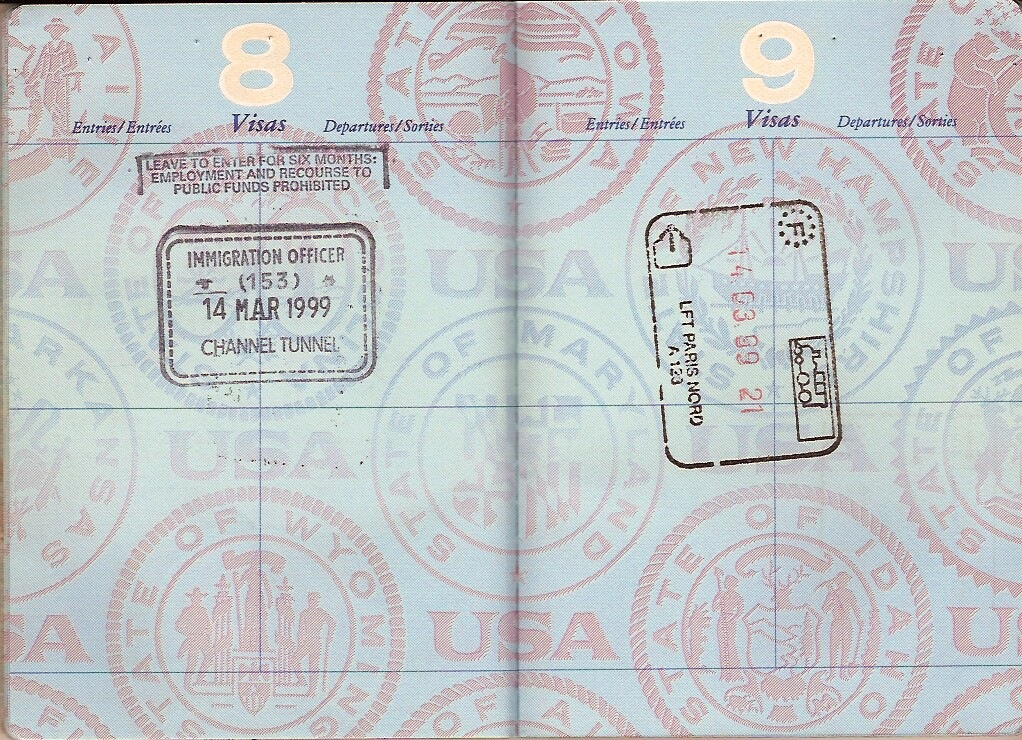
Visa pages of a non-biometric United States passport

=== Biometric passports ===
The legal driving force behind biometric passports is the Enhanced Border Security and Visa Entry Reform Act of 2002, which states that smart-card identity cards may be used in lieu of visas. That law also provides that foreigners who travel to the U.S., and want to enter the U.S. visa-free under the Visa Waiver Program, must bear machine-readable passports that comply with international standards. If a foreign passport was issued on or after October 26, 2006, that passport must be a biometric passport.

The electronic chip in the back cover of a U.S. passport stores an image of the photograph of the passport holder, passport data, and personal data of the passport holder; and has capacity to store additional data. The capacity of the radio-frequency identification (RFID) chip is 64 kilobytes, which is large enough to store additional biometric identifiers in the future, such as fingerprints and iris scans. Data within the chip is signed with an RSA-2048 certificate issued to the U.S. Department of State by the ICAO Public Key Directory. Any and all data must be authentic and untampered, or else the signature will be invalidated.

Data in a passport chip is scannable by electronic readers, a capability which is intended to speed up immigration processing. This data, along with the signature, is verified to either be valid or invalid. Like toll-road chips, data in passport chips can be read when passport chips are adjacent to readers. The passport cover contains a radio-frequency shield in the form of a wire mesh within the cover, so the cover must be opened for the data to be read. This cover acts as a Faraday cage.

According to the Department of State, the Basic Access Control (BAC) security protocol prevents access to that data unless the printed information within the passport is also known or can be guessed.

According to privacy advocates, the BAC and the shielded cover are ineffective when a passport is open, and a passport may have to be opened for inspection in a public place such as a hotel, a bank, or an Internet cafe. An open passport is subject to unwelcome reading of chip data, such as by a government agent who is tracking a passport holder's movements or by a criminal who is intending identity theft.

==== First version ====
The passport was redesigned between 2006 and 2007, after a previous redesign in 1993. In 2006, the Department of State began to issue biometric passports to diplomats and other officials. Later in 2006, biometric passports were issued to the public. Since August 2007, the department has issued only biometric passports, which include RFID chips.

In the 2007 version, images showcasing landscapes of the United States as well as places and objects of significance to U.S. history were introduced. There are 13 quotes in the 28-page version of the passport and patriotic-themed images on the background of the pages.

A biometric passport has the e-passport symbol at the bottom. There are 32 pages in the 2007 version biometric passport. Frequent travelers may request 52-page passports for no additional cost. Extra visa pages could previously be added to a passport, but, as of January 1, 2016, the service was discontinued entirely for security reasons.

The United States participates in the Five Nations Passport Group, an international forum for cooperation between the passport issuing authorities in the United Kingdom, Canada, New Zealand, and Australia to "share best practices and discuss innovations related to the development of passport policies, products and practices".

Cover of a biometric passport issued since 2007

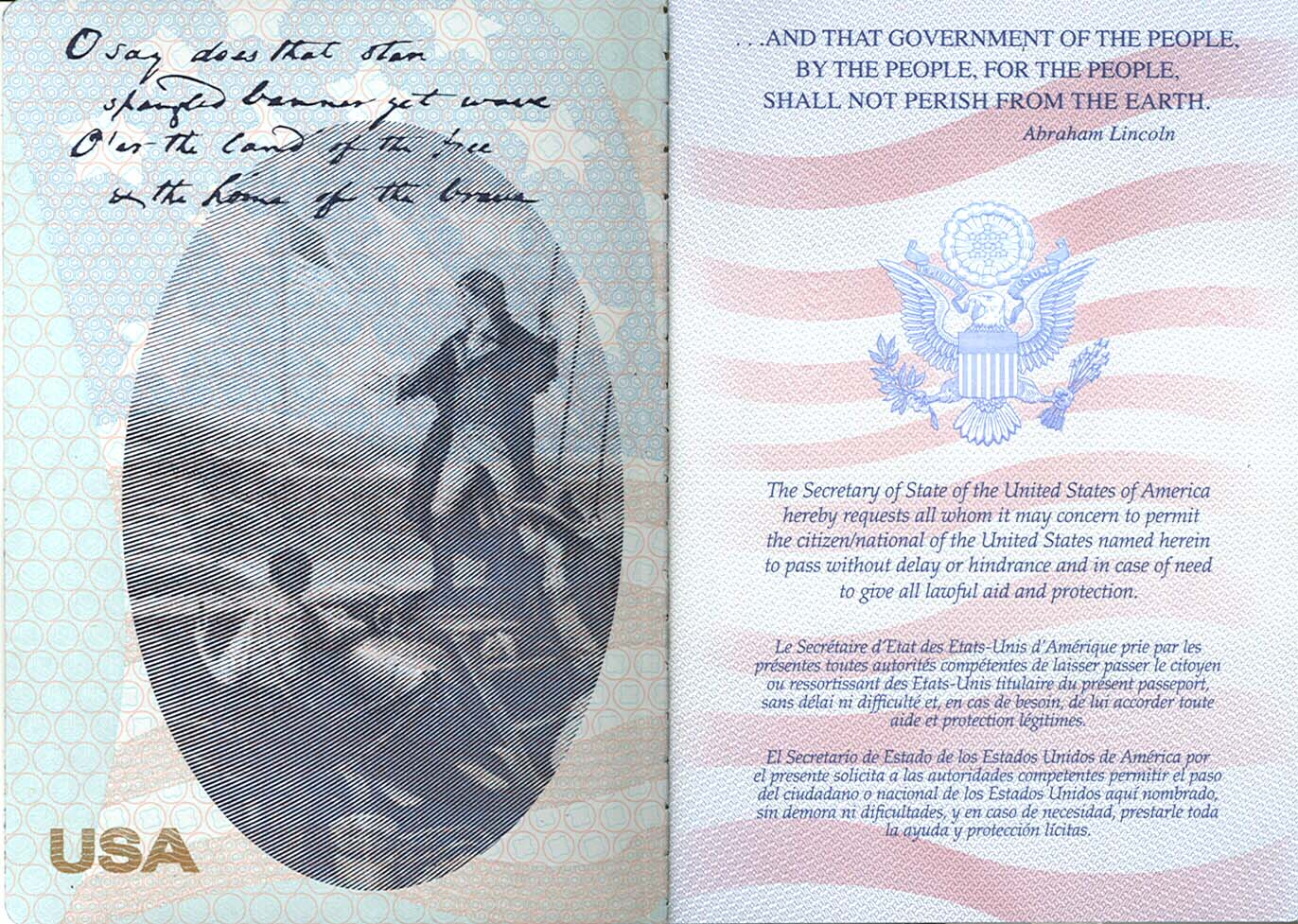
Passport message on a biometric passport (2007–2021)

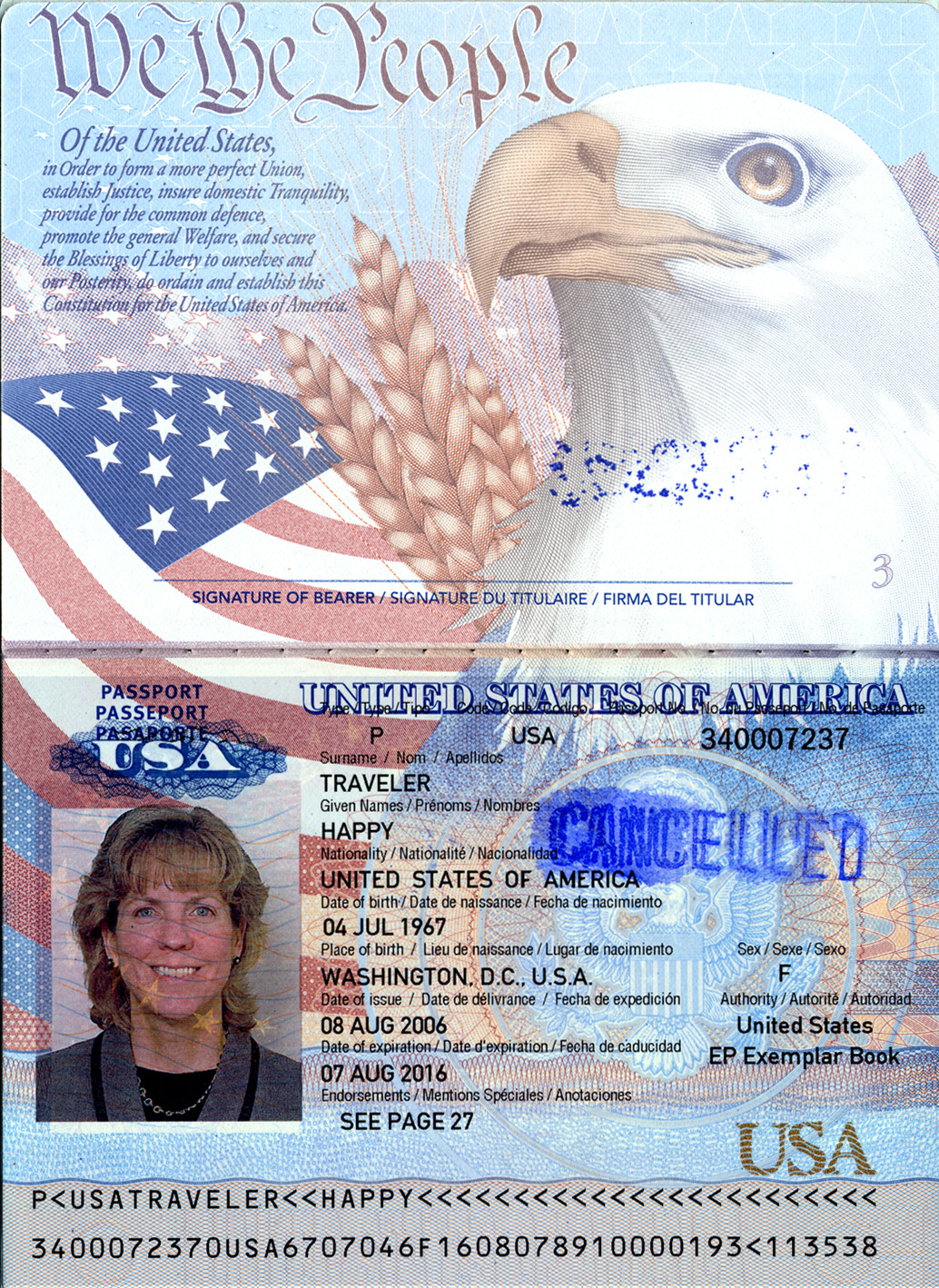
Signature page and data page of a biometric passport (2007–2021)

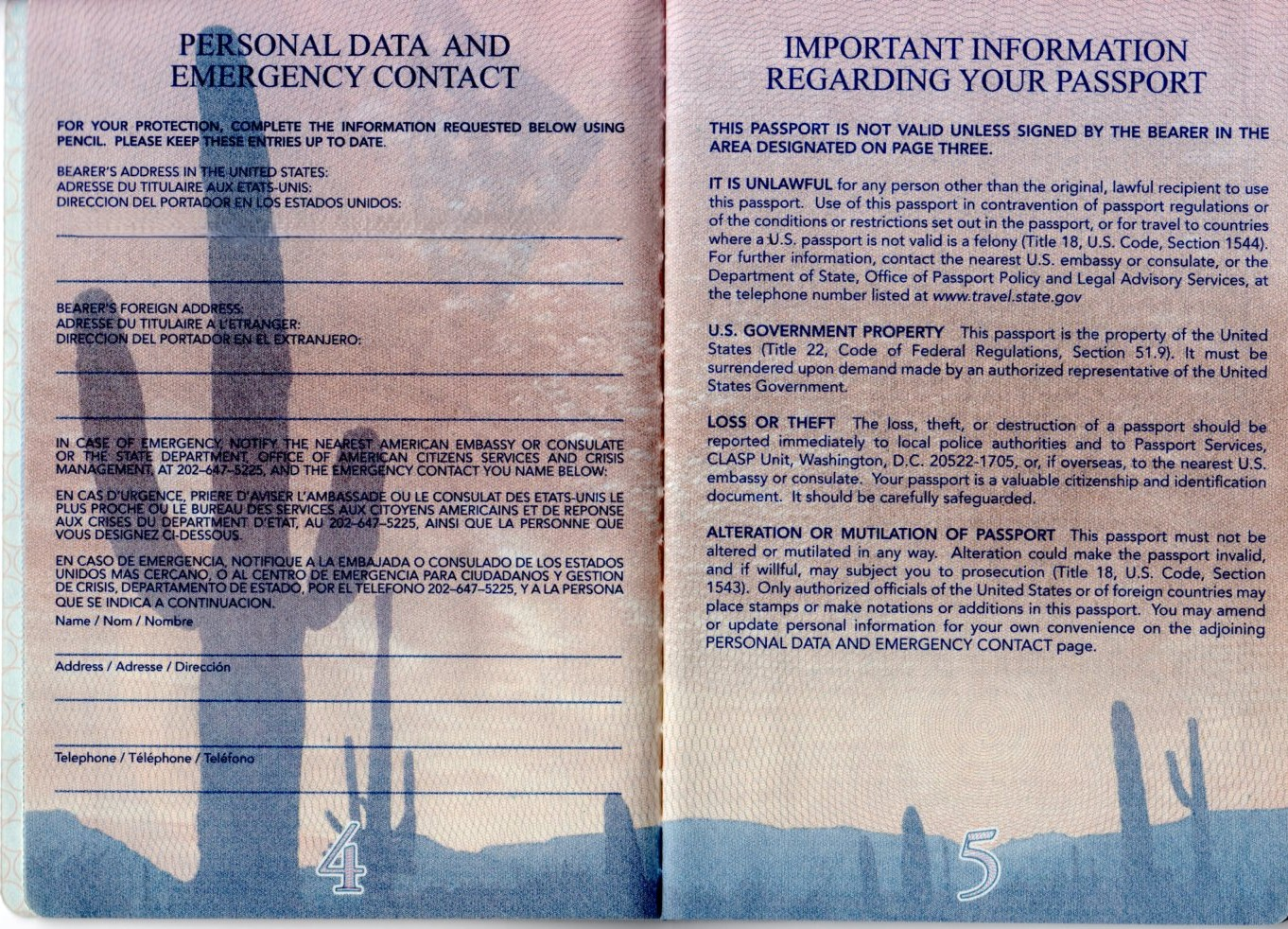
Personal Data & Emergency contact

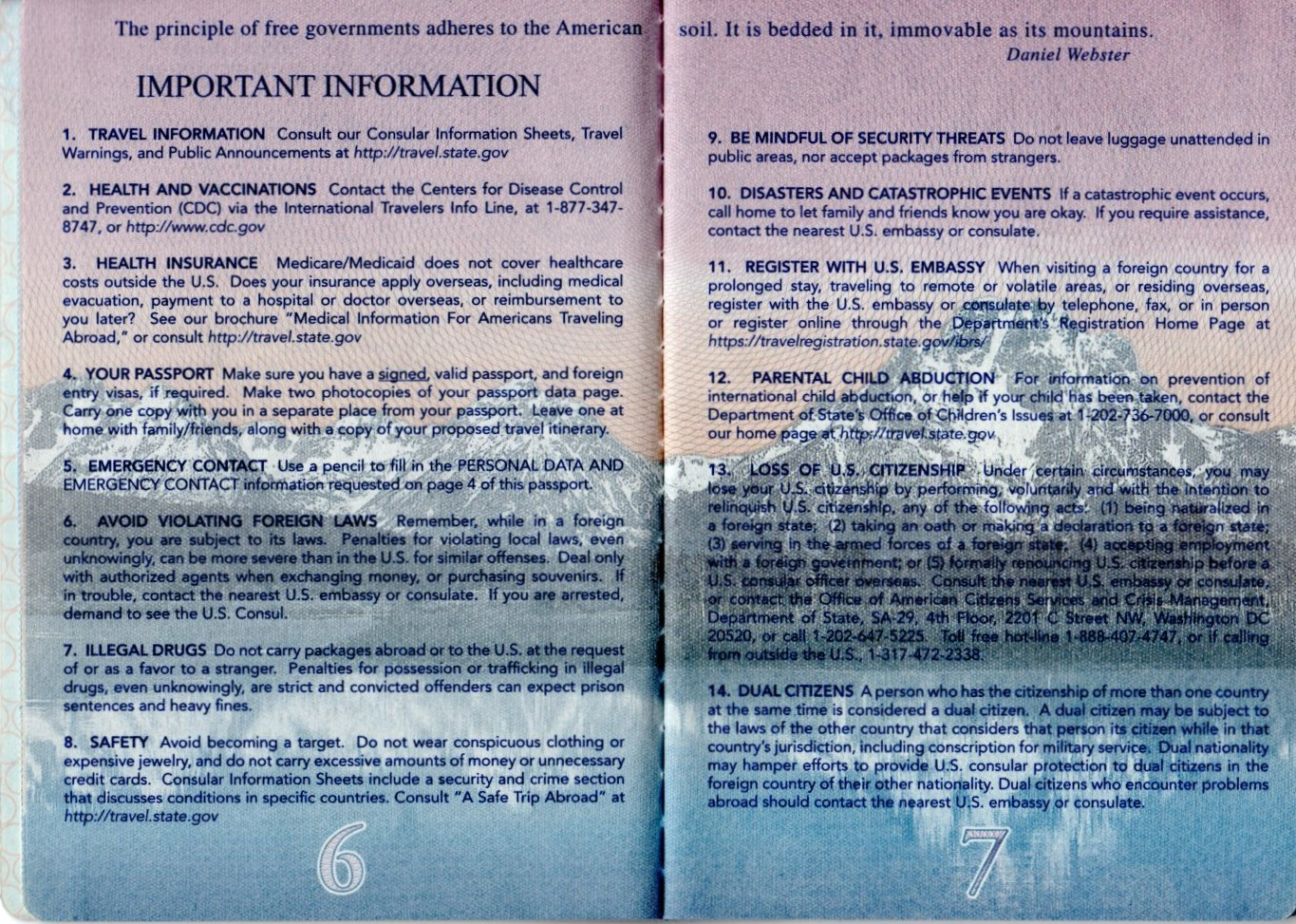
Pages for important information

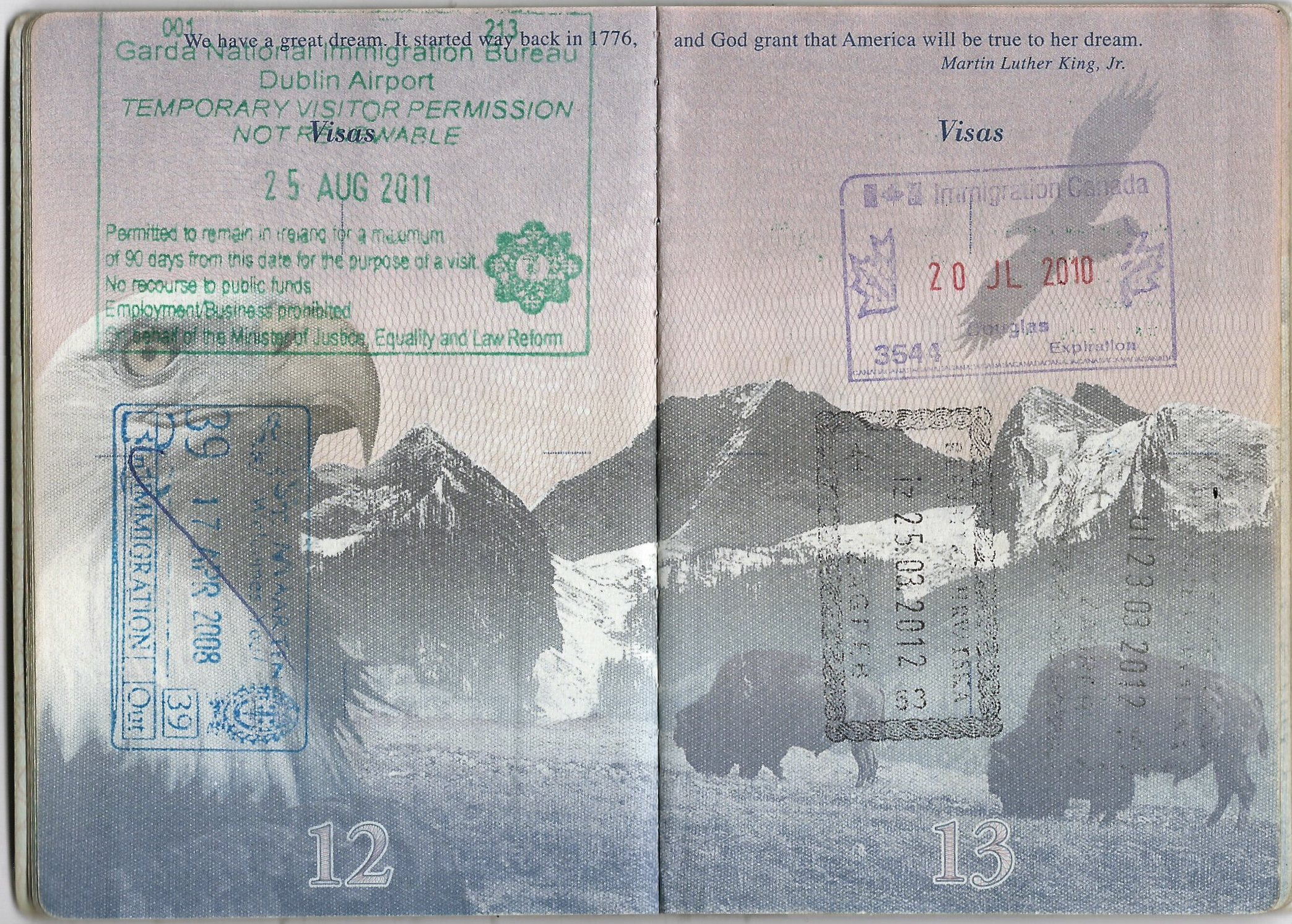
Visa pages

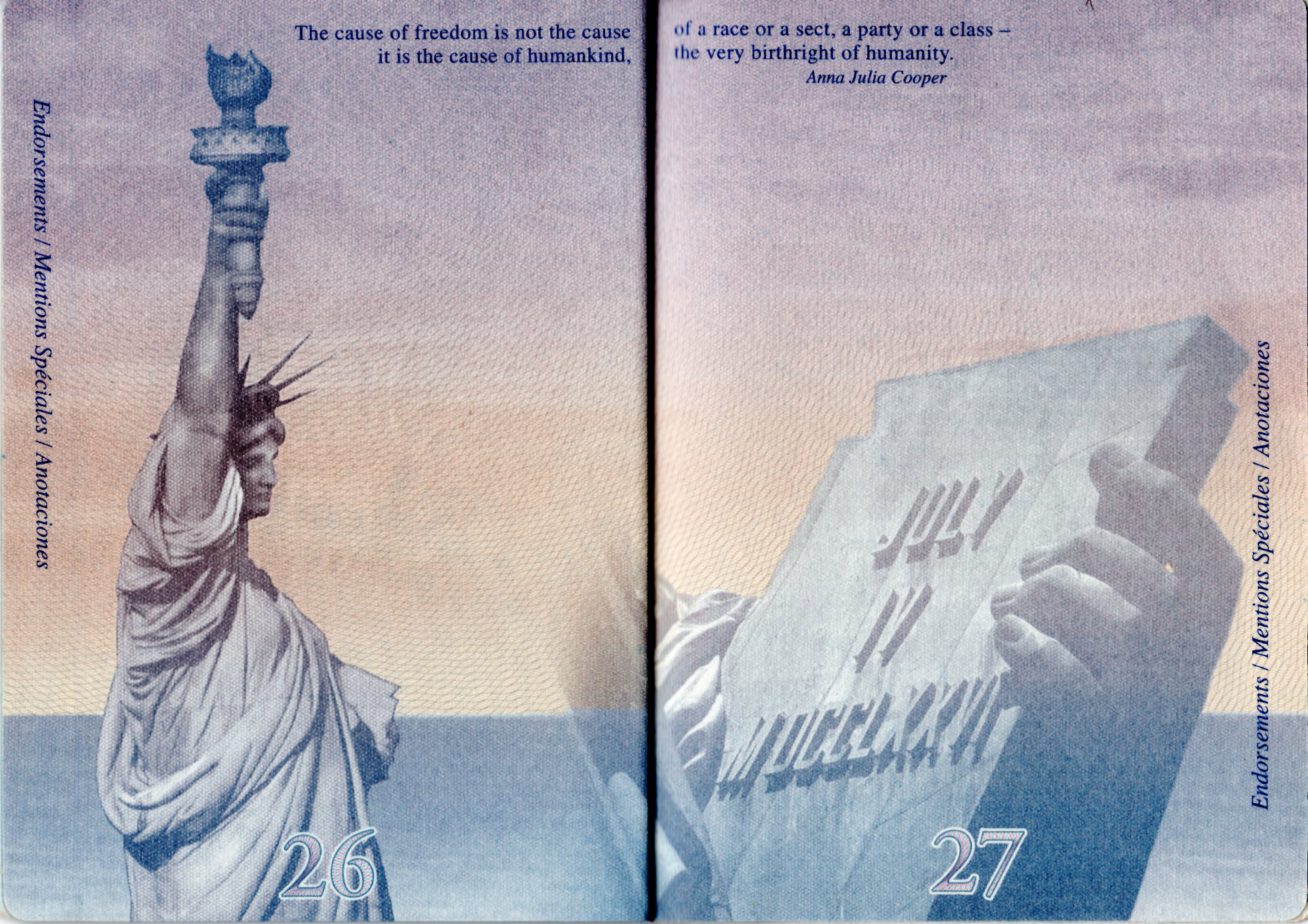
An Endorsements Page of U.S. Passport

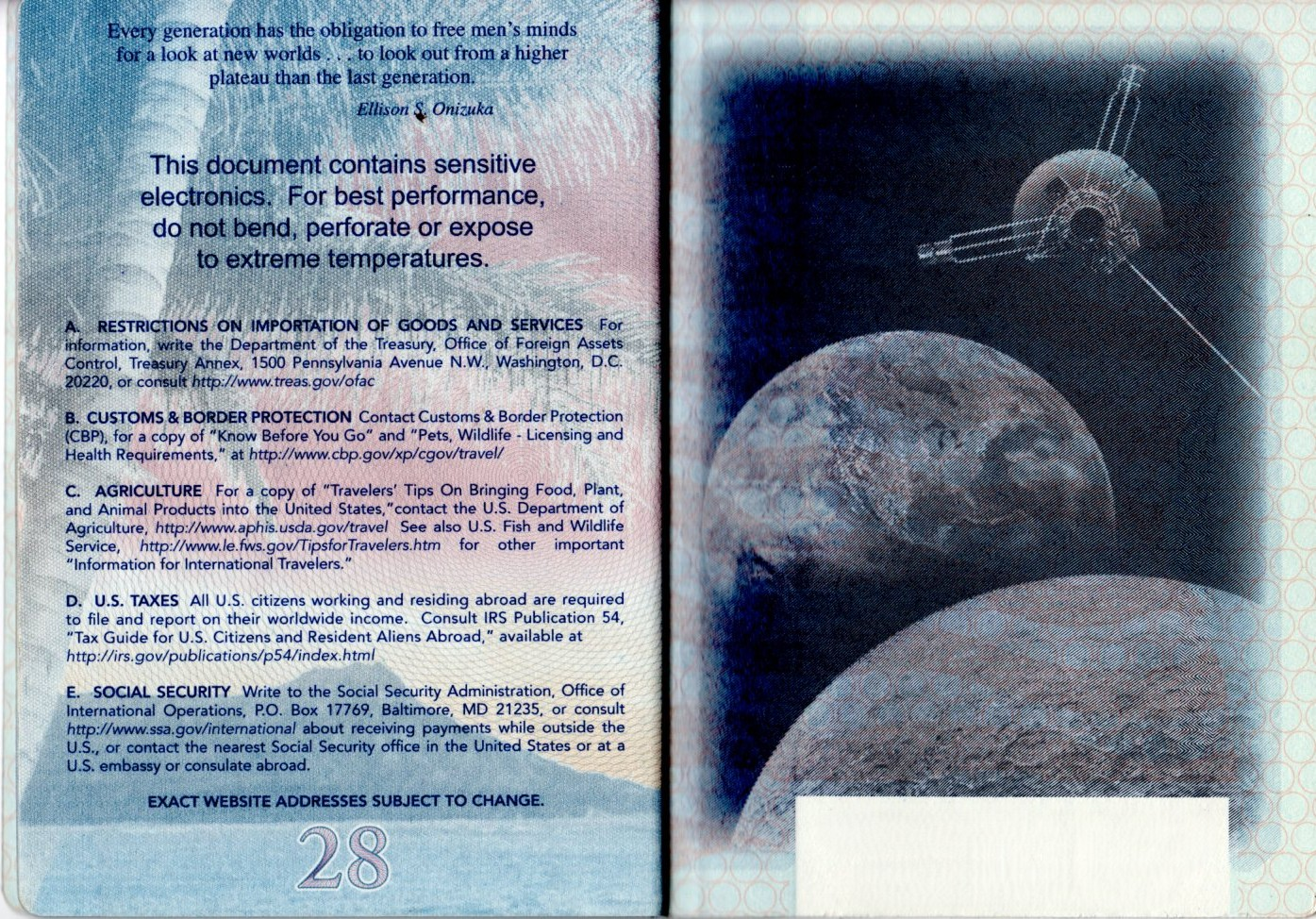
At the end page 28, Information resource

==== 2021 redesign ====
The United States Department of State has announced, and, in March 2021, started to issue, the next generation passport. The passport will have an embedded data chip on the information page protected by a polycarbonate coating; this will help prevent the book from getting wet and bending, and—should a passport be stolen—the chip will keep thieves from stealing personal information and falsifying an identity. The passport number will also be laser cut as perforated holes that get progressively smaller through pages—just one of several components of the "Next Generation" passport, including artwork upgrade, new security features such as a watermark, "tactile features," and more "optically variable" inks. Some designs on pages will be raised, and ink—depending on the viewing angle—will appear to be different colors.

The new biometric passport has reduced the total number of pages in the standard version from 28 to 26, and in the frequent traveler version from 52 to 50. This is because the separate endorsement page and signature page in the old version have been merged into a single page in the new version. Nonetheless, the total number of available visa pages remains unchanged, all the patterns and designs on the visa pages have also largely inherited the design of the old version.

On November 18, 2022, the Department of State announced that they are now issuing all passport books as Next Generation Passports.

The 2007 design of the front cover remains largely unchanged in the NGP though it will not close by itself because of the polycarbonate bio page

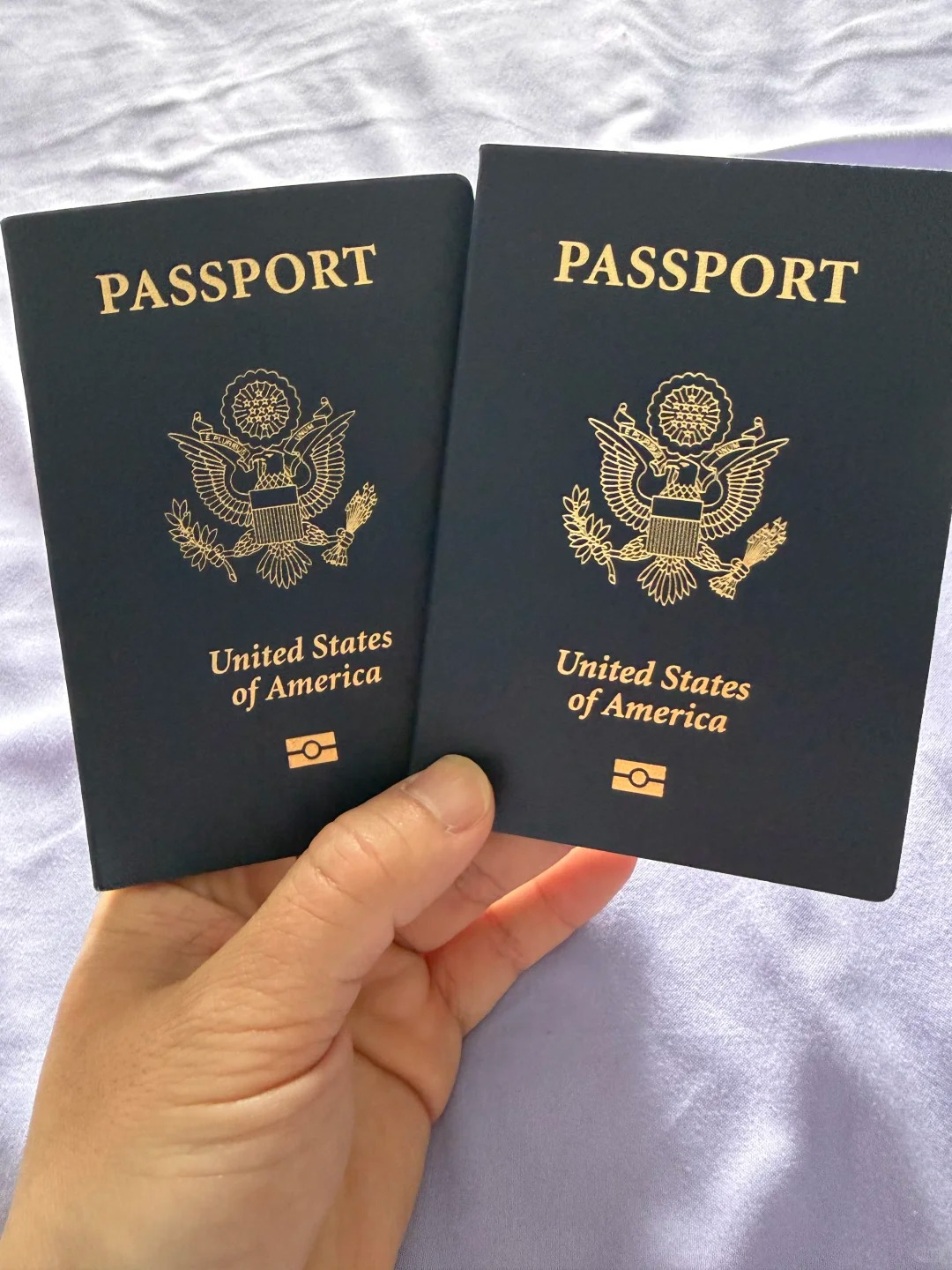
Comparison of passport covers between an 2007 version biometric passport (left) and a NGP version (right)

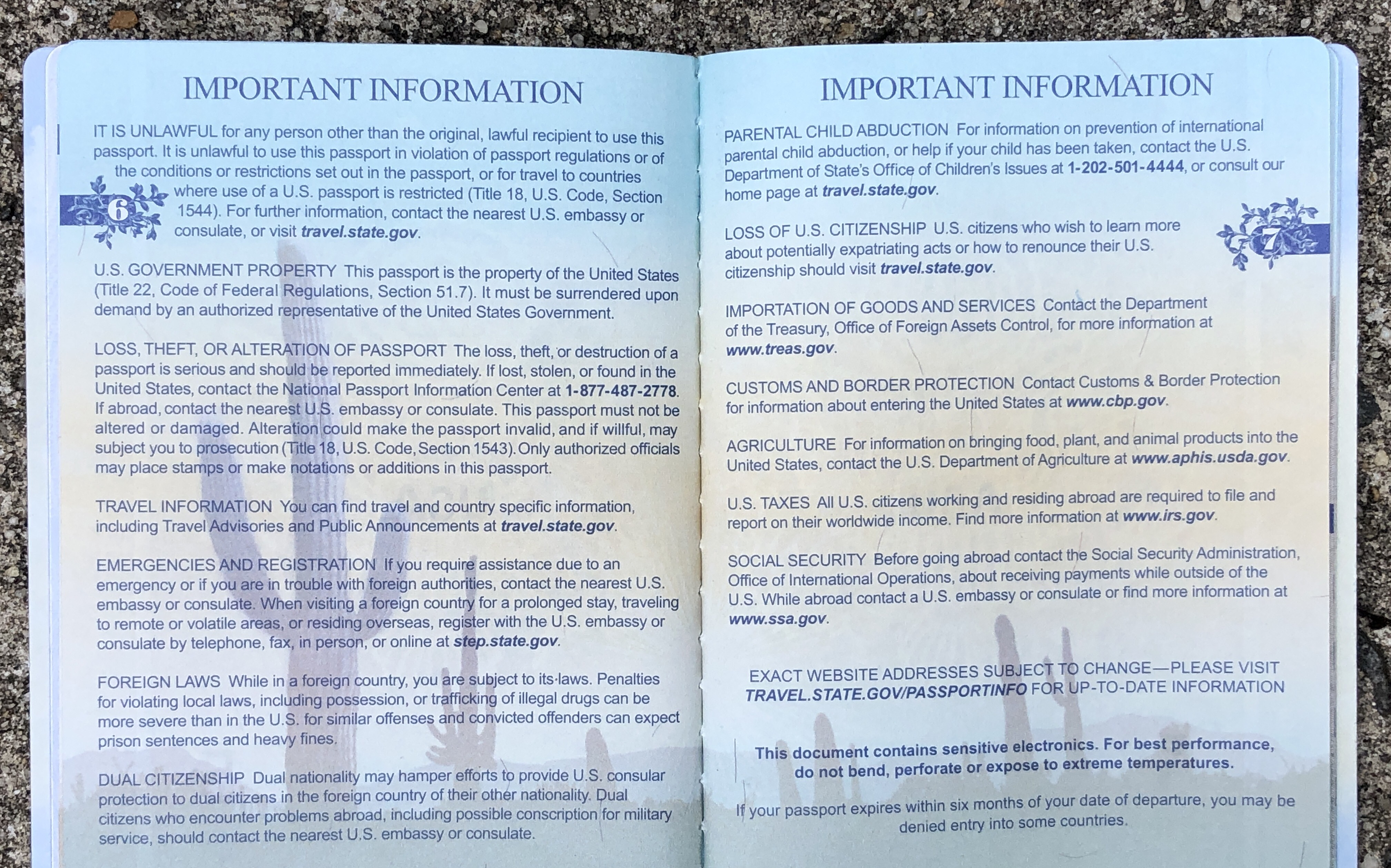
2021 Pages for important information

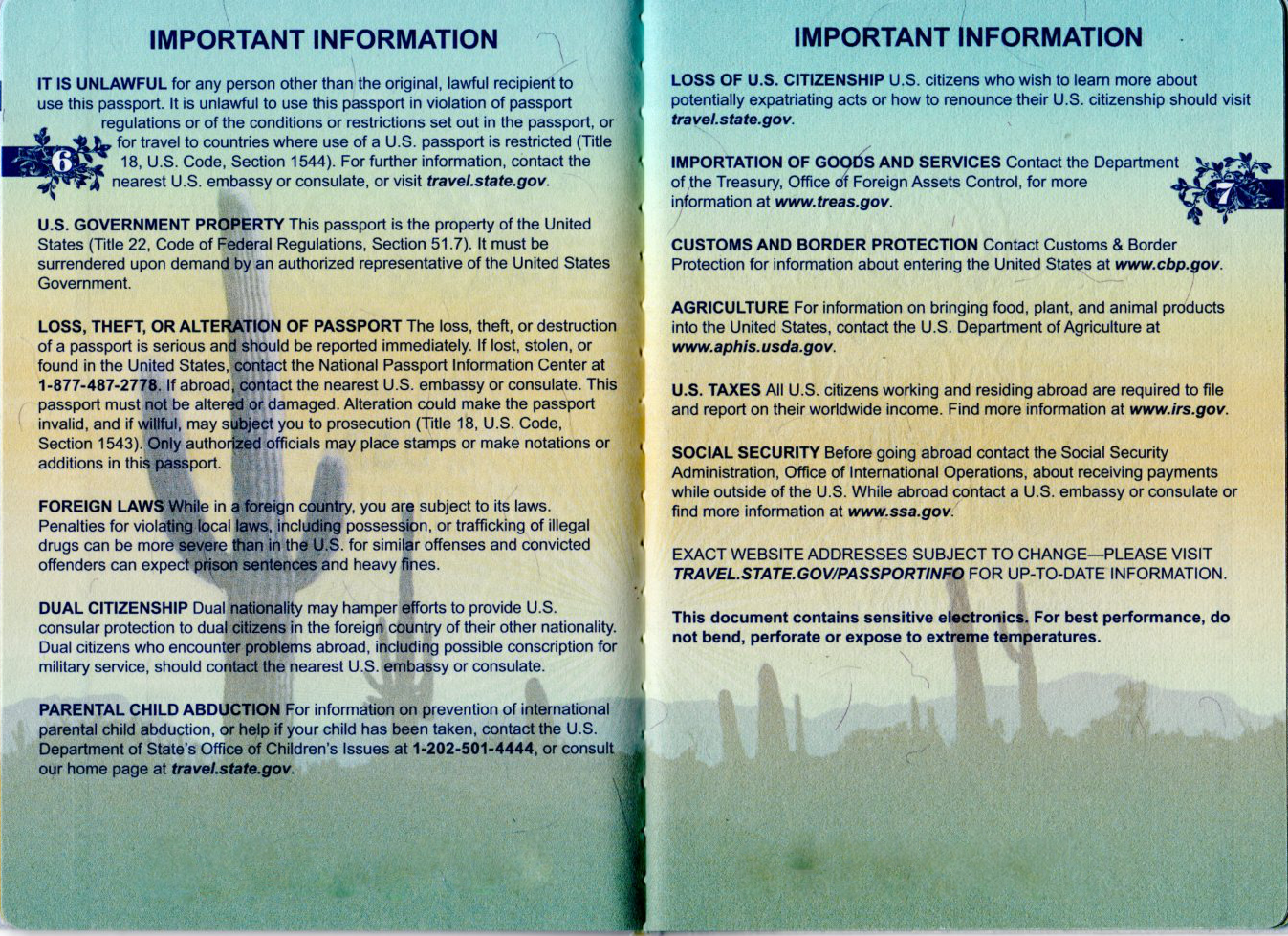
Updated 2024 page has important information.

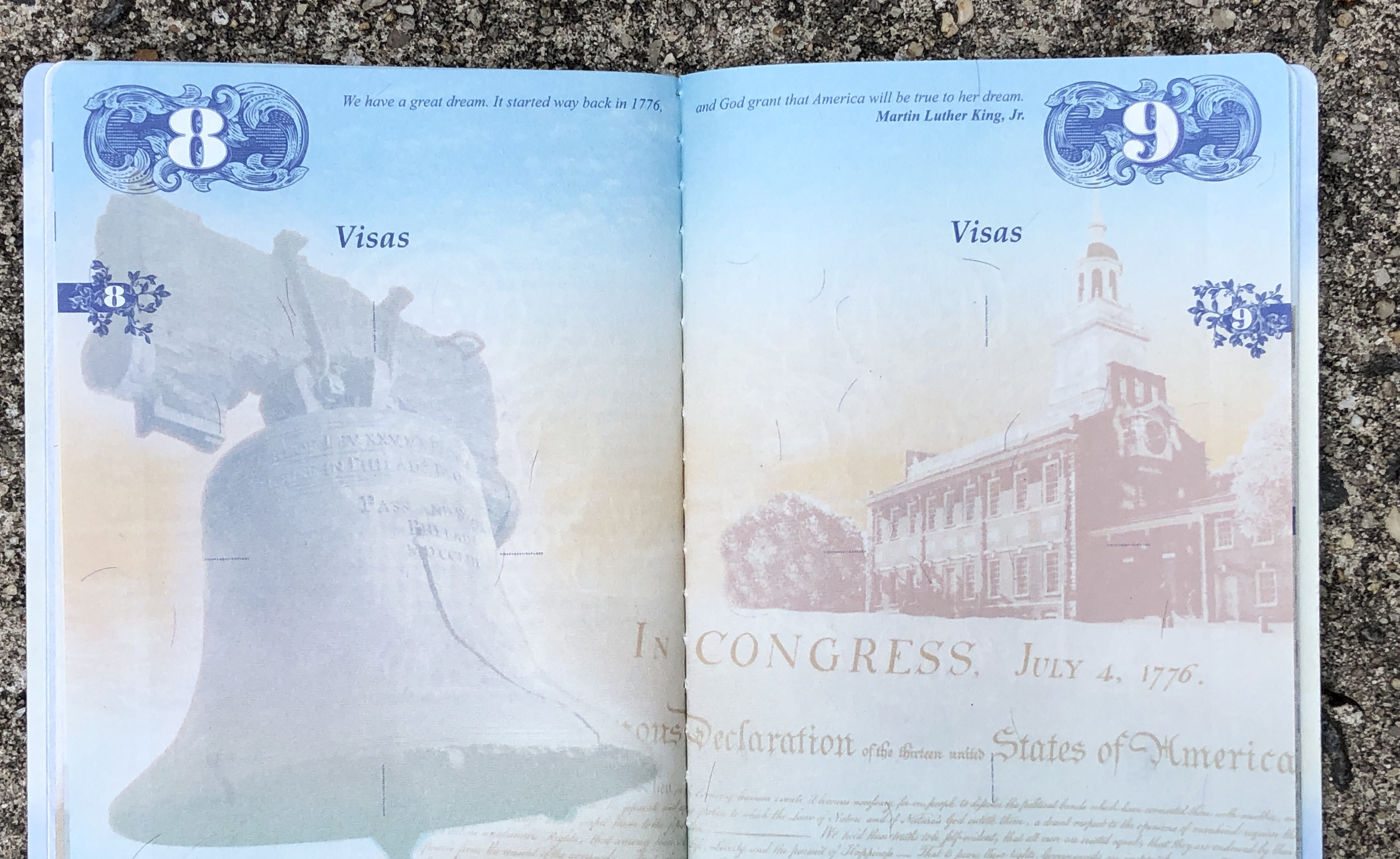
Visa pages

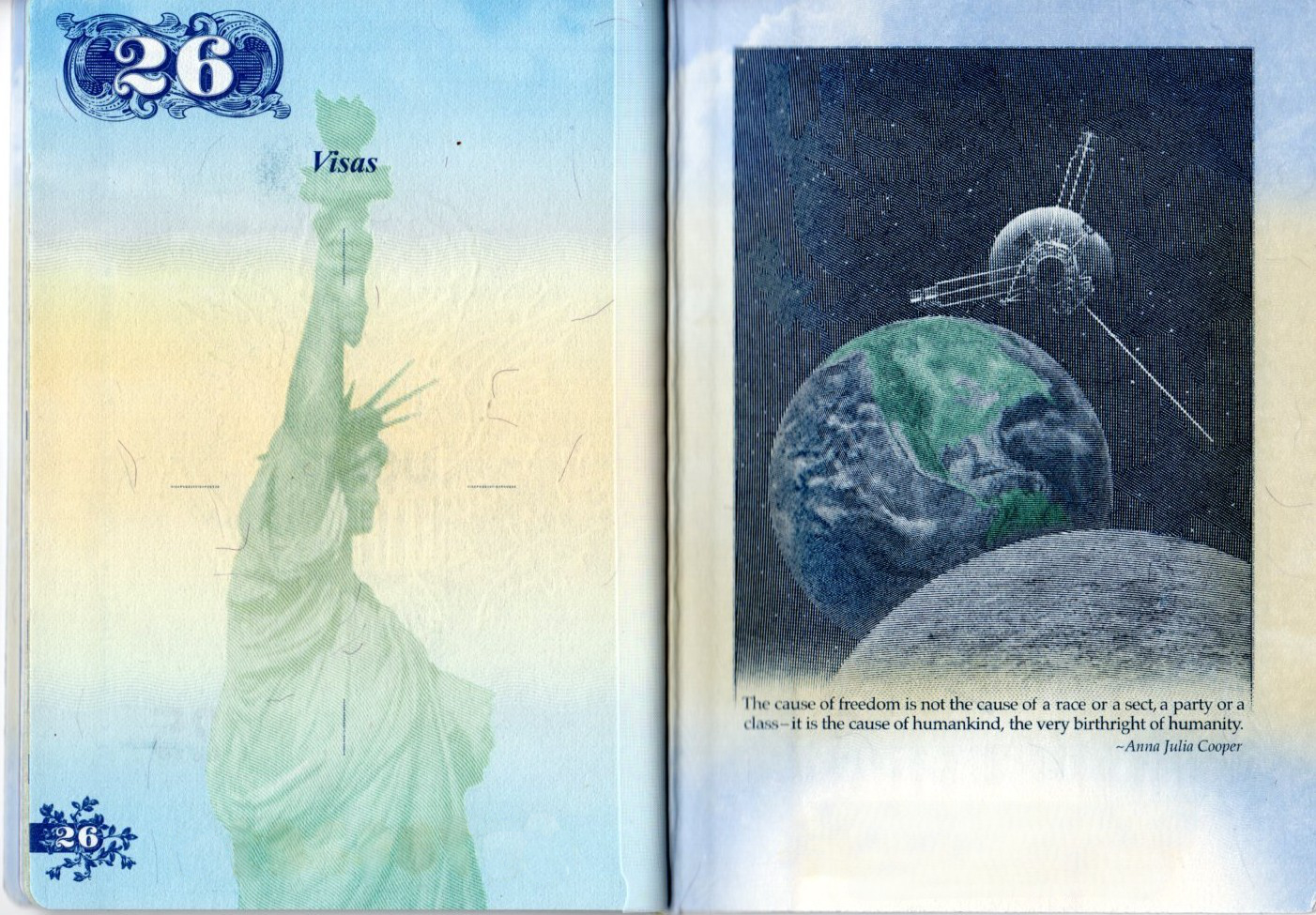
At the end of page 26, the Statue of Liberty appears right next to the Pioneer spacecraft

== Eligibility ==
United States passports are issuable only to persons who owe permanent allegiance to the United States – i.e., citizens and non-citizen nationals of the United States.

=== Citizens ===
Under the 14th amendment to the US Constitution, "All persons born or naturalized in the United States, and subject to the jurisdiction thereof, are citizens of the United States ..." Under this provision, "United States" means the 50 states and the District of Columbia only, but also technically includes the uninhabited Palmyra Atoll, an incorporated territory due to the Insular Cases.

By acts of Congress, every person born in Puerto Rico, the U.S. Virgin Islands, Guam, and the Northern Mariana Islands is a United States citizen by birth. Also, every person born in the former Panama Canal Zone whose father or mother (or both) was a citizen is a United States citizen by birth. Other acts of Congress provide for acquisition of citizenship by persons born abroad.

=== Non-citizen nationals ===
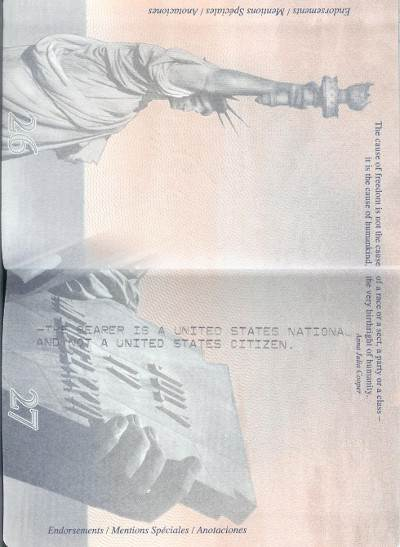
Message in the passport of an American Samoan stating that the passport holder is in fact a national, not citizen, of the United States.

Every citizen is a national of the United States, but not every national is a citizen. The only current example of non-citizen US nationals are those born in American Samoa (including Swains Island). Unlike the other current US territories, people born in American Samoa are not automatically granted US citizenship by birth as the territory is not incorporated and an act of Congress granting it, similar to other US territories, has not yet been passed for American Samoa. The other historical groups of non-citizen US nationals include those of former US territories and during periods of time before the acts of Congress granting citizenship to those born in current territories.

==== Passport in lieu of certificate of non-citizenship nationality ====
Few requests for certificates of non-citizenship nationality are made to the Department of State, which are issuable by the department. Production of a limited number of certificates would be costly, which if produced would have to meet stringent security standards. Due to this, the Department of State chooses not to issue such certificates; instead, passports are issued to non-citizen nationals. The issued passport certifies the status of a non-citizen national. The certification is in the form of "U.S. National" instead of "USA" on the front of the passport card, or an endorsement in the passport book: "The bearer is a United States national and not a United States citizen."

=== Dual citizenship ===
United States law permits dual nationality. Consequently, it is permissible to have and use a foreign passport. However, U.S. citizens are required to use a U.S. passport when leaving or entering the United States. This requirement extends to a U.S. citizen who is a dual national.

== Variants ==
=== Types ===
Front covers of different United States passport types

The United States began using distinct colors to differentiate passport types, such as blue for regular citizens, maroon for official government business, and black for diplomats, in 1961. Before this consolidation, the system was much more fragmented. In 1956, the Department of State consolidated 14 different categories of travel documents into the five main categories that are still in use today.

There are currently five main types of U.S. passport booklets, which are issued based on the identity of their holder and purpose. Unlike the practices of some other countries, the internal page designs of all types of U.S. passports are largely similar; consequently, the primary means of distinguishing them is based on the color of the cover and the text inscribed upon it.

The primary types are Regular (blue), Official (maroon), Diplomatic (black), Service (gray), and Emergency (purple), each type of passport may also has its own sub-types. Apart from regular and emergency passports which are mainly issued to civilians, other types of passports are generally issued by the Special Issuance Agency.

Image	Cover's color	Type	Notes
	dark blue	Regular	Issuable to all citizens and non-citizen nationals. Periods of validity: for those age 16 or over, generally ten years from the date of issue; for those 15 and younger, generally five years from the date of issue.
	dark blue	"no-fee passports"	A sub-type of regular passports is "no-fee passports", issuable to citizens in specified categories for specified purposes, such as an American sailor for travel connected with their duties aboard a U.S.-flag vessel. Period of validity: generally 5 years from the date of issue. A no-fee passport has an endorsement which prohibits its use for a purpose other than a specified purpose.
	gray	Service	Issuable to "certain non-personal services contractors who travel abroad in support of and pursuant to a contract with the U.S. government", to demonstrate the passport holder is traveling "to conduct work in support of the U.S. government while simultaneously indicating that the traveler has a more attenuated relationship with the U.S. government that does not justify a diplomatic or official passport." Period of validity: generally five years from the date of issue.
	maroon	Official	Issuable to citizen-employees of the United States assigned overseas, either permanently or temporarily, and their eligible dependents, and to some members of Congress who travel abroad on official business. Also issued to U.S. military personnel when deployed overseas. Period of validity: generally five years from the date of issue.
	black	Diplomatic	Issuable to American diplomats accredited overseas and their eligible dependents, to citizens who reside in the United States and travel abroad for diplomatic work, to the president of the United States, the president-elect, the vice president, and vice president-elect, as well as former presidents and vice presidents. The chief justice, Supreme Court justices, current cabinet members, former secretaries and deputy secretaries of state, the attorney general and deputy attorney general, some members of Congress, and retired career ambassadors are also eligible for a diplomatic passport. Diplomatic passports issued to an individual who is not a current officeholder are known as "Courtesy Diplomatic Passports." Period of validity: generally five years from the date of issue.
	violet	Emergency	Issuable to citizens overseas, in urgent circumstances, e.g. imminent death and funeral of a family member, lost or stolen passport while abroad, or similar situation. Period of validity: generally one year from the date of issue. An emergency passport may be exchanged for a full-term passport.
	violet	Limited-Validity	Issued to those who are not eligible for a regular passport booklet due to previous revocation, e.g. U.S. citizens or nationals who are with unpaid child support, active felony warrants or court orders; who are identified as National security threats; who need to return to the US but cannot afford the cost of a regular passport due to lack of funds (e.g., applicants of repatriation loans). These passports are usually endorsed with conditions for the holder; they are valid only for one direct return to the United States and may, depending on the specific circumstances of each holder, result in arrest by legal authorities, such as CBP or local police, immediately upon entry.
	violet	Special Validation	A Special Validation Passport is a limited-validity U.S. passport that contains a specific endorsement permitting travel to a country that is otherwise legally restricted for all U.S. citizens (namely, North Korea since 2017). These passports share the identical design as the emergency passports. They are typically issued in addition to the regular passport for one year to cover a single round trip, though the State Department has occasionally granted two-year, multiple-entry validations for humanitarian workers with a long-standing history of work in the country since late 2021.

=== Second passport ===
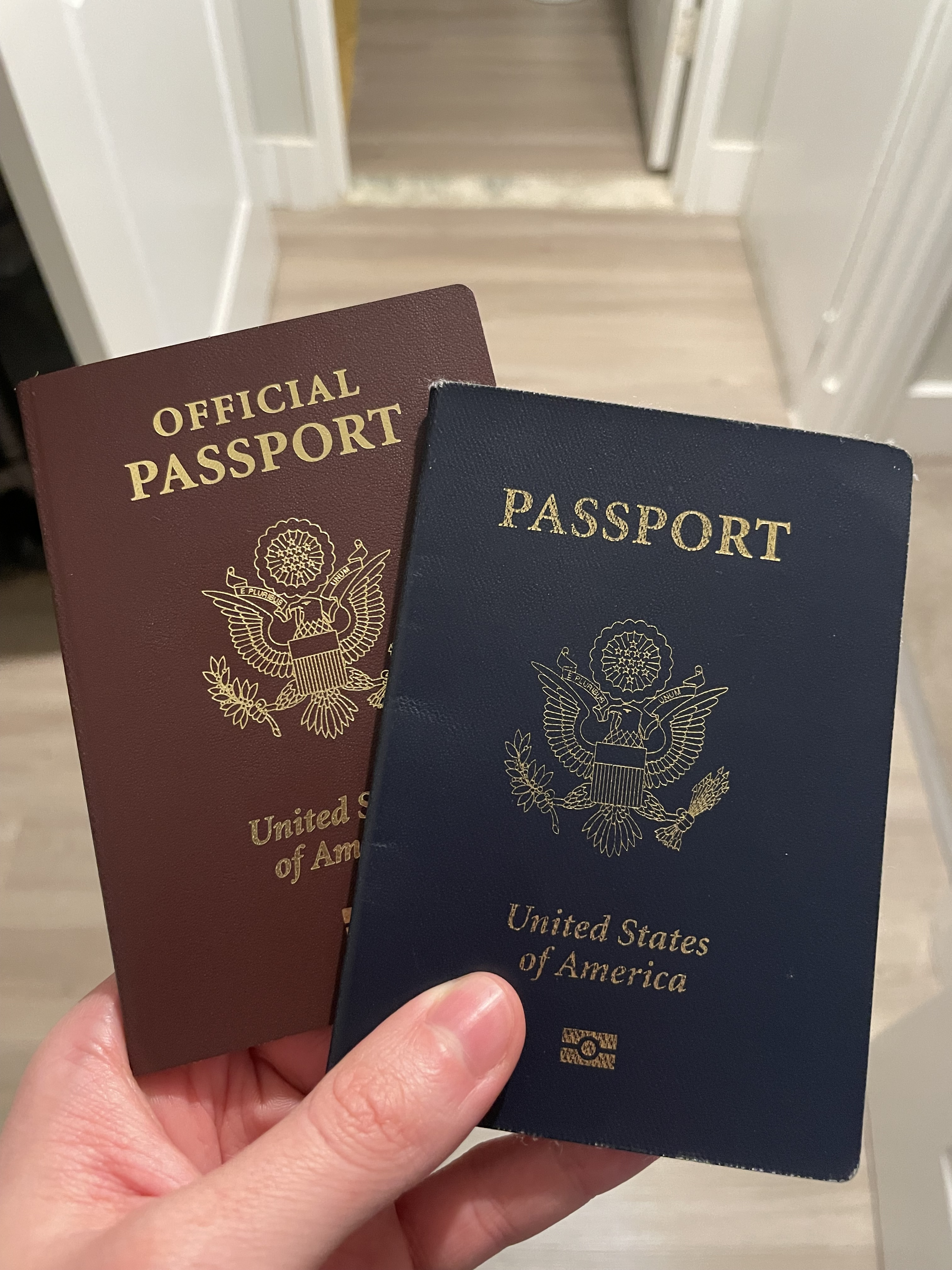
Two United States passports, a regular passport for personal use, and a second passport for official business

More than one valid United States passport of the same type may not be held, except if authorized by the Department of State. It is routine for the Department of State to authorize a holder of a regular passport to hold, in addition, a diplomatic passport or an official passport or a no-fee passport.

One circumstance which may call for issuance of a second regular passport is a prolonged visa-processing delay. Another is safety or security, such as travel between Israel and a country which refuses to grant entry to a person with a passport that indicates travel to Israel. The period of validity of a second passport issued under either circumstance is generally four years from the date of issue.

Diplomatic couriers are usually issued multiple diplomatic passports to support the processing and possession of relevant visas for all the countries they may travel to.

=== Limited editions ===
The United States is one of the few countries that issues special-edition passports to commemorate significant events. These commemorative, limited passport editions are generally released to mark the anniversaries of national holidays or significant historical figures. These passports usually adopt the same inner pages as the standard-issue passports at the moment, whereas the cover and the attached first and last pages feature a specially designed, limited-edition format.

The first commemorative edition of the U.S. passport was issued in 1976, when the color of the cover was changed to blue, as part of the bicentennial celebration of American independence between 1975–1977. This was the first version of U.S. passport to use a blue cover; prior to this, American passports had green covers since 1941. This change subsequently influenced the cover color of the regular U.S. passport, hence all regular passports issued afterwards became blue and the blue design continued to remain afterwards until 1993.

From April 1993 to March 1994, the U.S. briefly issued passports with green covers instead of blue as a special tribute to Benjamin Franklin for the 200th anniversary of the U.S. Consular Service. This was the 2nd commemorative passport design ever introduced. After March 1994, regular passports with blue covers and pages showing U.S. state seals were reissued.

Semiquincentennial

A limited-edition variant with the portrait of president Donald Trump was firstly announced on April 28, 2026, as part of Semiquincentennial celebrations. The finalized passport design was unveiled subsequently on June 26 of the same year. This marks the third time the State Department has issued a special limited-edition passport, and the first time the portrait of a sitting president has been incorporated into the passport's design.

The cover of the variant features a gold-stamped Betsy Ross flag with the number 250 on the back, and on the front cover, the text "United States of America" has been capitalized and moved to the top, while "Passport" is positioned at the bottom, in a layout that complies with ICAO recommendations for passport cover design. The first page of the interior features a portrait of President Trump, while the final page displays an 1818 painting by John Trumbull depicting the signing of the Declaration of Independence. Apart from the above, all other interior elements, from the request page to the visa pages, retain the existing NGP standards and design.

The Trump administration initially planned to print a total of 25,000 to 30,000 limited-edition passports, but later increased the figure to approximately 40,000 maximum. The variant is planned to be released only at the Washington Passport Agency starting from July 6, 2026 until supplies are exhausted; while all passports issued there will feature this design by default, applicants retain the right to choose the standard version. The vast majority of applicants remains unaffected by this adjustment, as applicants who submit their applications through USPS, embassies and consulates abroad, local libraries, or passport agencies outside of Washington, D.C., will not receive a limited edition passport.

Although the Washington Passport Agency currently only accepts applications from those with appointments and urgent short-term travel needs, the State Department has planned at least two "special passport application acceptance events" that will allow all eligible individuals to schedule appointments and apply at the agency.

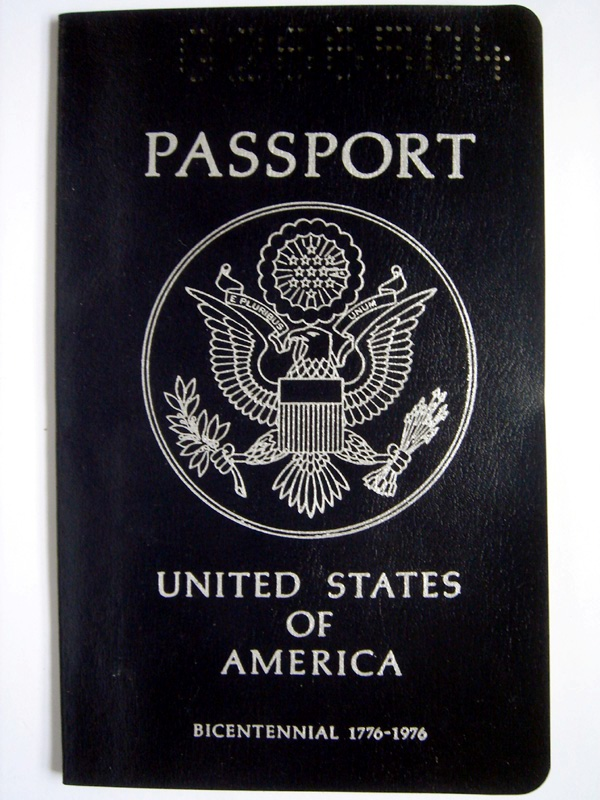
Cover of one of the first blue passports (the color was introduced for the Bicentennial in 1976)

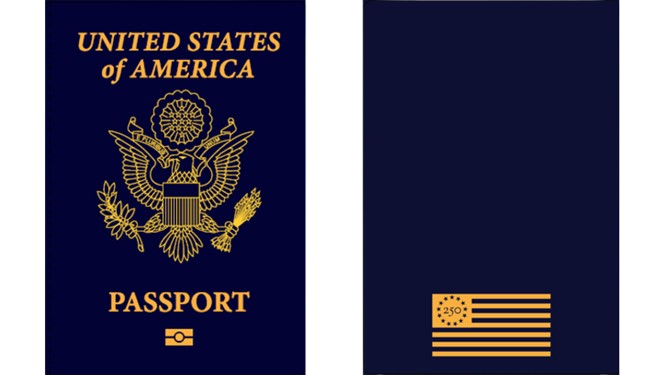
Front cover of the special-edition U.S. passport design for Semiquincentennial commemoration issued in 2026

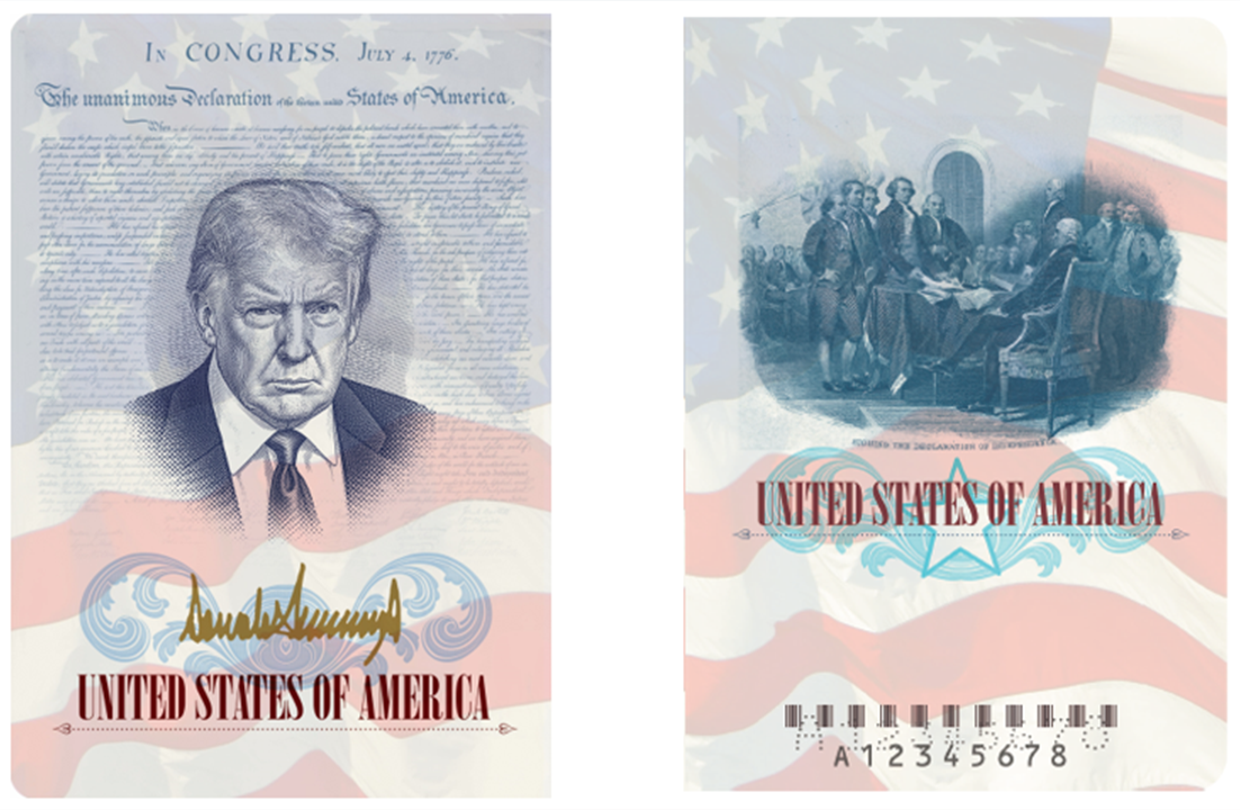
Inner side of the cover (first and last page) of the Semiquincentennial U.S. passport

=== Other travel documents ===
In addition to passports, several other types of travel documents are also issued by the U.S. government; these are issued to various groups of people depending on the circumstances, and their holders are not necessarily limited to U.S. citizens or nationals, as is the case with standard passports. (Generally, the State Department is responsible for issuing travel documents to U.S. nationals, whereas USCIS typically issues travel documents held by eligible foreign nationals in the U.S. )

U.S. passport card

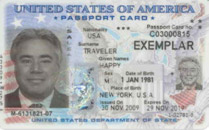
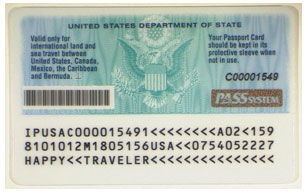
obverse and reverse sides of a U.S. passport card

Not a full passport, but a small ID card issued by the U.S. government for crossing land and sea borders with Canada, Mexico, the Caribbean, and Bermuda. All persons eligible for a regular passport book are eligible for a passport card. The card does not denote the bearer's official or diplomatic status, if any. The ID card is valid for 10 years for people 16 or older and 5 years for minors under 16. The passport card is not valid for international air travel. It is possible to hold the U.S. passport card in addition to a regular passport. These ID cards are WHTI and Real ID compliant, making them valid for domestic air travel, and have digitally-signed biometrics within an internal RFID chip, readable at a land or sea port of entry into or out of the United States.

Travel Documents issued by USCIS (green cover)

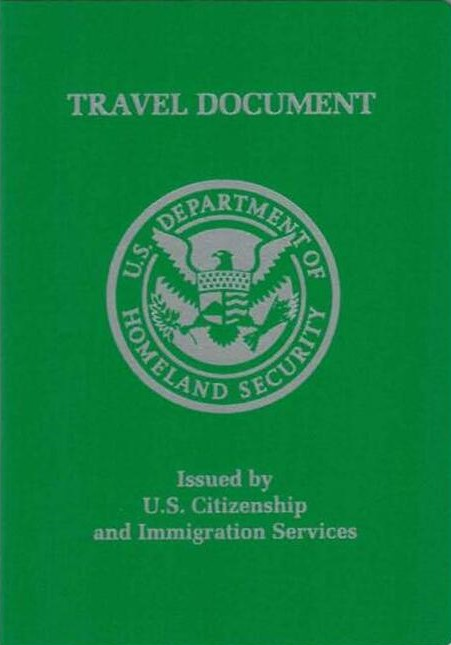
Cover of a U.S. travel document

- Refugee Travel Document, cover titled "Travel Document": Although also known as "Refugee Passport", it is not a full passport, but issued to aliens who have been classified as refugees or asylees.
- Re-entry permit (green cover), cover titled "Travel Document": Not a full passport, but issued to a permanent resident alien in lieu of a passport. The re-entry permit guarantees them permission to re-enter the U.S. and is usually valid for a period of two years. A re-entry permit can also be used by permanent residents who are stateless or cannot get a passport for international travel, or who wish to visit a country they cannot on their passport.

== Layout ==
=== Format ===
On the front cover, a representation of the Great Seal of the United States is at the center. "PASSPORT" (in all capital letters) appears above the representation of the Great Seal, and "United States of America" appears below (in Garamond italic on non-biometric passports, and Minion italic on post-biometric passports).

An official passport has "OFFICIAL" (in all capital letters) above "PASSPORT". The capital letters of "OFFICIAL" are somewhat smaller than the capital letters of "PASSPORT".

A diplomatic passport has "DIPLOMATIC" (in all capital letters) above "PASSPORT". The capital letters of "DIPLOMATIC" are somewhat smaller than the capital letters of "PASSPORT".

=== Passport message ===
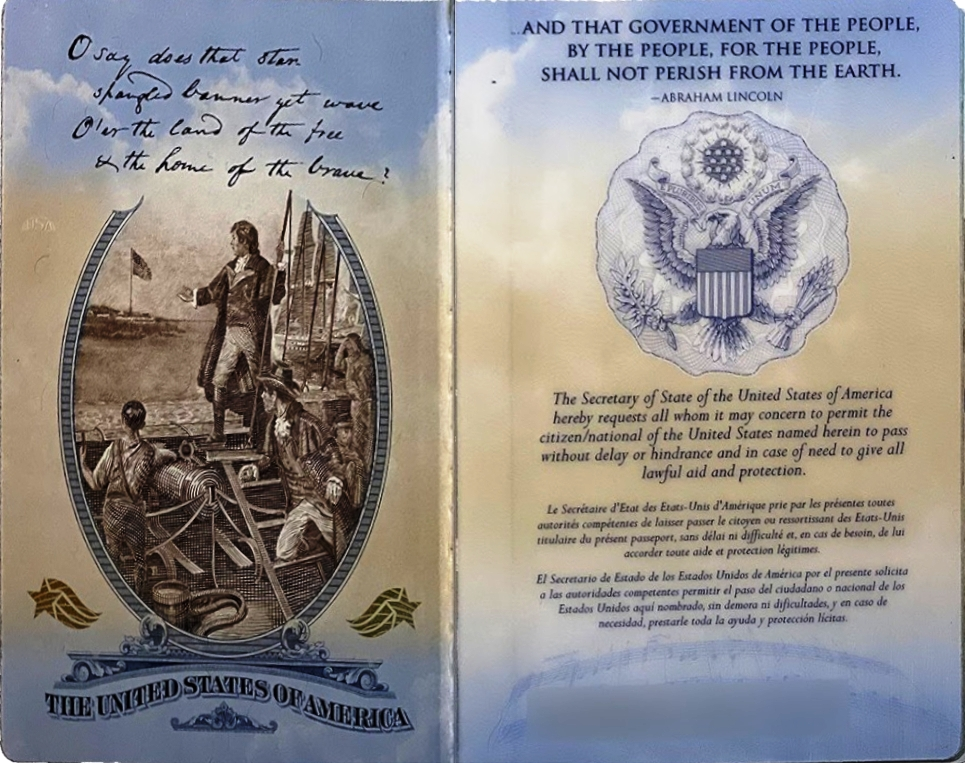
Passport message on the request page of a biometric next generation passport (2021–present)

Passports of many countries contain a message, nominally from the official who is in charge of passport issuance (e.g., secretary of state, minister of foreign affairs), addressed to authorities of other countries. The message identifies the bearer as a citizen of the issuing country, requests permission for the bearer to enter and pass through the other country, and requests further that, when necessary, the bearer be given help consistent with international norms. In American passports, the message is in English, French, and Spanish. The message reads:

In English:

The Secretary of State of the United States of America hereby requests all whom it may concern to permit the citizen/national of the United States named herein to pass without delay or hindrance and in case of need to give all lawful aid and protection.

in French:

Le Secrétaire d'Etat des Etats-Unis d'Amérique prie par les présentes toutes autorités compétentes de laisser passer le citoyen ou ressortissant des Etats-Unis titulaire du présent passeport, sans délai ni difficulté et, en cas de besoin, de lui accorder toute aide et protection légitimes.

and in Spanish:

El Secretario de Estado de los Estados Unidos de América por el presente solicita a las autoridades competentes permitir el paso del ciudadano o nacional de los Estados Unidos aquí nombrado, sin demora ni dificultades, y en caso de necesidad, prestarle toda la ayuda y protección lícitas.

The term "citizen/national" and its equivalent terms ("citoyen ou ressortissant"; "ciudadano o nacional") are used in the message as some people born in American Samoa, including Swains Island, are nationals but not citizens of the United States.

The masculine inflections of "Le Secrétaire d'Etat" and "El Secretario de Estado" are used in all passports, regardless of the sex of the secretary of state at the time of issue.

==== Languages ====
At a League of Nations conference in 1920 about passports and through-train travel, a recommendation was that passports be written in French (historically, the language of diplomacy) and one other language.

English, the de facto national language of the United States, has always been used in U.S. passports. At some point after 1920, English and French were used in passports. Spanish was added during the second term of the Clinton administration.

The field names on the data page, the passport message, the field names and emergency instructions on the “personal data and emergency contact” page, and the designations of the amendments-and-endorsements pages, are printed in English, French, and Spanish.

=== Data page ===
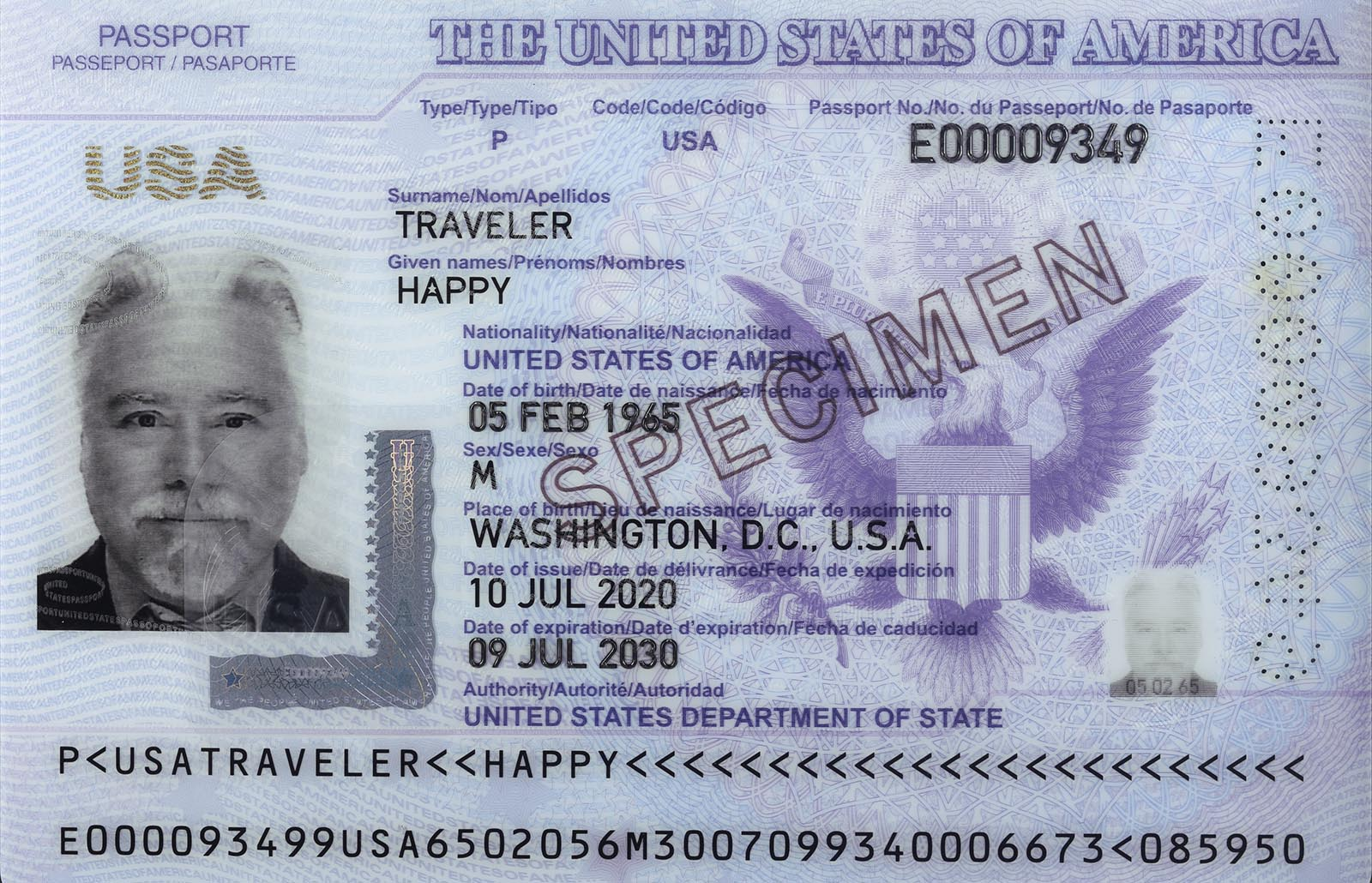
data page of a biometric next generation passport (2021–present)

Each passport has a data page and a signature page.

A data page is a page containing information about the passport holder. It is the only page in a U.S. passport laminated in plastic to prevent tampering. A data page has a visual zone and a machine-readable zone. The visual zone has a digitized photograph of the passport holder, data about the passport, and data about the passport holder:

- Photograph
- Type [of document, which is "P" for "passport"]
- Code [of the issuing country, which is "USA" for "United States of America"]
- Passport Number
- Surname
- Given Name
- Nationality (United States of America)
- Date of Birth
- Place of Birth (see below)
- Sex (F or M, as determined by Executive Order 14168)
- Date of Issue
- Date of Expiration
- Authority (United States Department of State)
- Endorsements

The machine-readable zone is present at the bottom of the page.

==== Genders ====
In June 2021, Secretary of State Antony Blinken announced that an option for American passport holders to select a third gender category on their passports was planned but would take time to implement. Additionally, applicants changing their gender would no longer be required to provide external documentation like a court order or medical certification. Dana Zzyym, who had sued the Department of State for not issuing a passport with a non-binary gender marker in 2015, was reportedly issued the first US passport with an "X" gender designation in October 2021. "X" was added as a gender option for all applicants on April 11, 2022. Issuance of passports with the "X" marker, as well as any gender marker besides an applicant's sex as assigned at birth, was suspended in January 2025 after the second Trump administration declared the federal government would only recognize binary sex assigned at "conception" [sic] via an executive order. The 2026 Foreign Affairs Manual directed passport processing employees to use multiple means, including commercial and government databases, to "determine the applicant's biological sex at birth" if an applicant has "indicators of a prior change to sex marker."

==== Place of birth ====
Place of birth was first added to U.S. passports in 1917. The standards for the names of places of birth that appear in passports are listed in volume 8 of the Foreign Affairs Manual, published by the Department of State. A request to list no place of birth in a passport is never accepted.

===== U.S. birthplaces =====
For birthplaces within the United States and its territories, it contains the name of the state or territory followed by "U.S.A." (e.g. North Carolina, U.S.A), except for the U.S. Virgin Islands and American Samoa which are listed alone. Passports may also indicate the city of applicants born in U.S. states, but are not required. For persons born in Washington State or the District of Columbia, passports indicate "Washington, U.S.A." or "Washington, D.C., U.S.A.", respectively, as the place of birth.

===== Foreign birthplaces =====
For an American whose birthplace is outside the United States, only the country or dependent territory is mentioned. The name of the country is the current name of the country that presently controls the place of birth, regardless of what the name was at the time of birth. For example, Americans born before 1991 in the former Soviet Union (including the Baltic states, whose annexation by the Soviet Union was never recognized by the U.S.) would have the post-Soviet country name listed as the place of birth, e.g. Armenia instead of the Armenian Soviet Socialist Republic, Soviet Union. Another example is that for Americans born in the former Panama Canal Zone, "Panama" is listed as the place of birth for people born on or after October 1, 1979; people born before October 1 can choose to designate the city of place of birth. A citizen born outside the United States who objects to the standard country name may be allowed to have the municipality of birth entered on the passport. However, if a foreign country denies a visa or entry because of the place-of-birth designation, the Department of State will issue a replacement passport at normal fees, and will not facilitate entry into the foreign country.

- China, Taiwan, Hong Kong/Macau SARs: Special provisions exist to deal with the complexities of American passport holders born in the Greater China Region. Per the One-China policy, the United States recognizes the People's Republic of China as the sole legal government of China, while considering the status of Taiwan to be undetermined. However, Americans born in Taiwan can choose to have either "Taiwan", "China", or their city of birth listed as place of birth. Americans born in Hong Kong or Macau would have their place of birth as "Hong Kong SAR" or "Macau SAR", but the option of listing the city of birth only (e.g. "Hong Kong" or "Macau" without "SAR") is not available. As Tibet is recognized as part of China, the place of birth for Americans born in Tibet is written as "China", with the option of listing only the city of birth.
- Israel and the Palestinian territories: Special provisions are in place for Americans born in Israel and the Palestinian territories. For births in places other than Jerusalem and the Golan Heights, "Israel", "West Bank", or "Gaza Strip" is used. If born before 1948 or in other cases, "Palestine" may be used. For births in the Golan Heights, "Israel" has been used since March 2019 when the US recognized the Golan Heights as part of Israel; previously "Syria" was used regardless of date of birth. Prior to October 2020, due to the legal uncertainty of the status of Jerusalem, "Jerusalem" was used for births in Jerusalem within its 1948 municipal borders regardless of date of birth. In 2002, Congress passed legislation that said that American citizens born in Jerusalem may list "Israel" as their country of birth, although Presidents George W. Bush and Barack Obama did not allow it. A federal appeals court declared the 2002 law invalid on July 23, 2013, and the Supreme Court upheld that decision on June 8, 2015. In October 2020, the Department of State announced that it had changed its policy and stated that Americans born in Jerusalem would be permitted to have either "Jerusalem" or "Israel" designated as their place of birth. However, for those who were born before 1948 in areas outside of Jerusalem's 1948 municipal limits but now are included within Jerusalem, their place of birth is listed as "Palestine" or the area's name as known before the expansion of Jerusalem. Those born after 1948 in these areas may choose to have the area's name listed as their place of birth, but not as "Jordan" or "West Bank".

In all cases, the city or town of birth may be used in place of the standard designations.

===== Born in the air or at sea =====
For an American born aboard an aircraft or ship, if the birth occurs in an area where no country has sovereignty (i.e. in or over international waters), the place of birth is listed as "in the air" or "at sea" where appropriate.

=== Endorsement and signature page ===
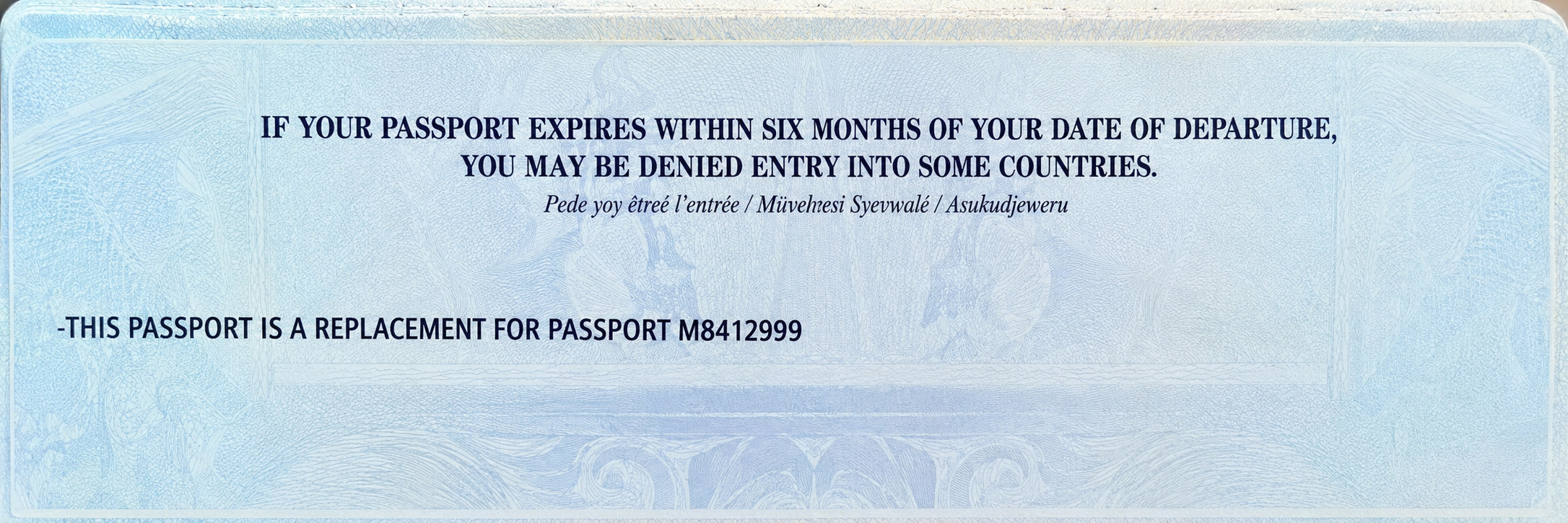
Endorsement of a renewal for passport on a NGP issued after 2021

The endorsement page is used to record supplementary personal information related to the passport holder. In general, endorsements are made in connection with passport renewal upon expiration, or to record information concerning the loss or damage of a previous passport. This page may not be used for the placement of visas or for entry and exit stamps.

In the 2007 passport design, this section originally consisted of two pages located after the visa pages. However, in the 2021 design update, the standalone endorsement page was discontinued and replaced by a merged endorsement and signature page located on the page immediately facing the data page for easier visibility. Furthermore, all endorsements in the 2021 redesign are pre-printed at the time of issuance and cannot be altered. As a result, any change to an endorsement requires the issuance of a new passport.

In the integrated endorsement page of NGP, a color photograph of the passport holder is also included in addition to the holder’s signature field and the endorsement itself, serving as a supplement the black-and-white photograph displayed on the polycarbonate data page.

==== Signature ====
A signature page has a line for the signature of a passport holder. A passport is not valid until it is signed by the passport holder in black or blue ink. If a holder is unable to sign their passport, it is to be signed by a person who has legal authority to sign on the holder's behalf.

==== Endorsements ====
Endorsements generally concern information pertaining either to the passport or to the passport holder, and may be classified into the following categories:

- Replacement Status: Indicates the passport is a replacement for a lost, stolen, or damaged book.
- Limited Validity: Notes that the passport expires on a specific date and cannot be extended, often used for emergency travel.
- Name Information: Provides the full legal name if it was too long to fit on the data page, or lists a widely recognized pseudonym/stage name.
- Identity: Identifies the bearer as a diplomat, member of Congress, Peace Corps volunteer, as well as other government official on active duty, or alternatively, to denote that the holder is a non-citizen US national in cases where the holder was born in certain United States overseas territories (e.g., American Samoa) .
- Legal Restrictions: Notes if the bearer is a covered sex offender or if the document is only valid for return to the United States.

==== Sex offenders ====
In November 2017, pursuant to the International Megan's Law, the Department of State announced that passports of US citizens previously convicted of sex crimes against minors would be endorsed with the message, "The bearer was convicted of a sex offense against a minor, and is a covered sex offender pursuant to [U.S. law]."

=== Emergency Contact ===
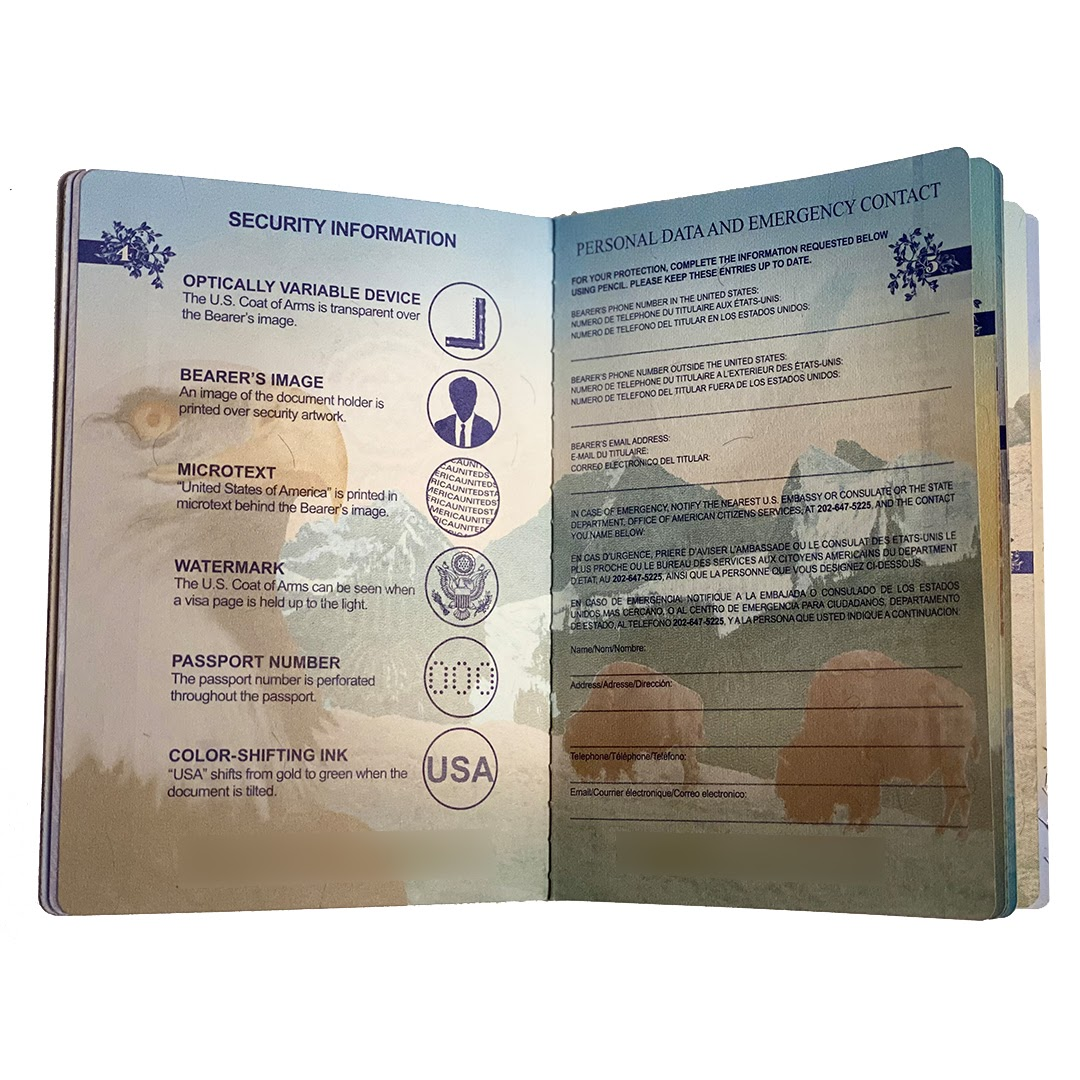
Emergency contact page of a NGP

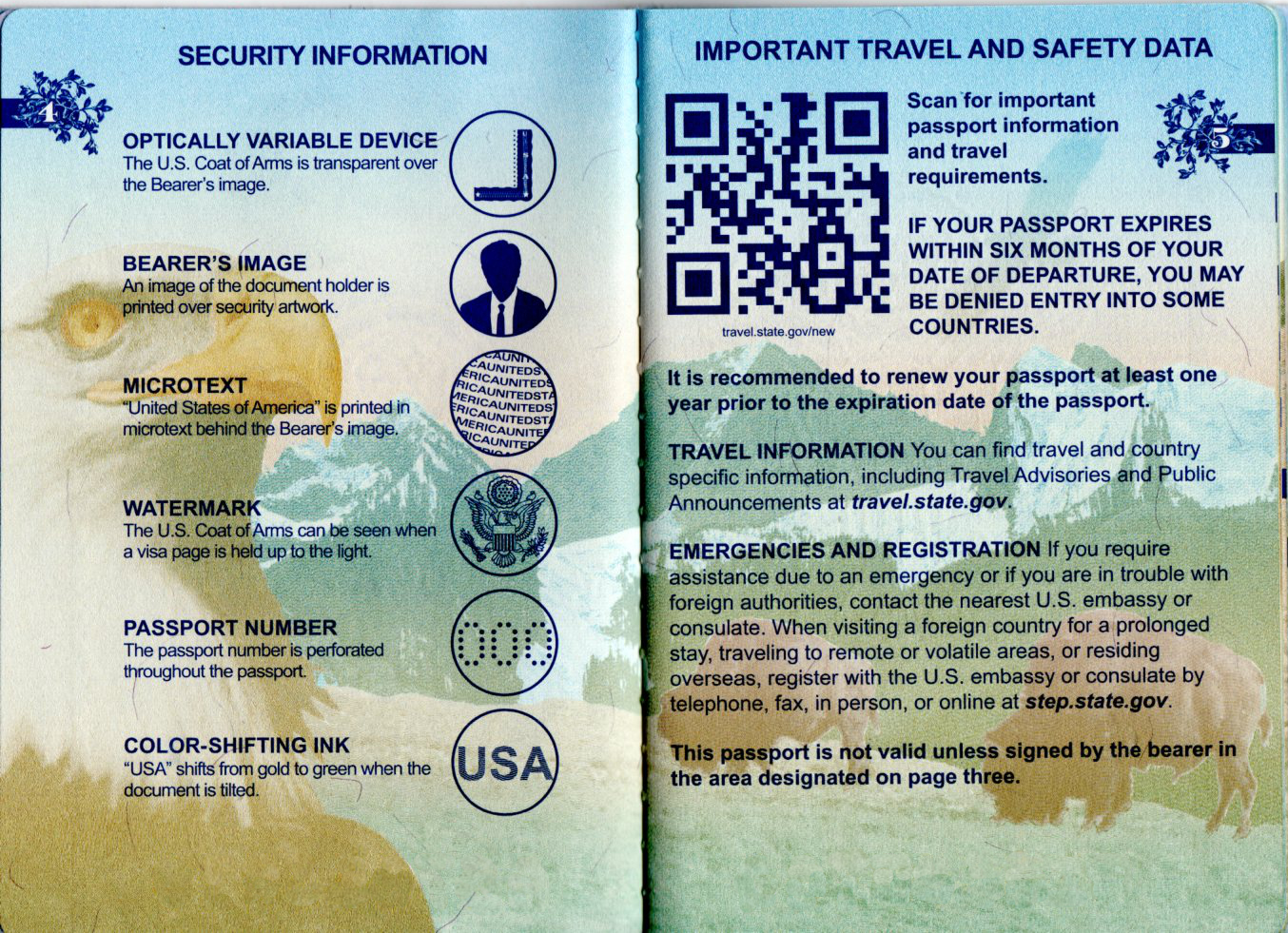
Updated 2026 No Emergency contact. Page 5, Important travel and Safety appears the QR code

Until early production runs of the Next Generation Passport (NGP), booklets continued to include a page intended for the passport holder to handwrite personal and emergency contact information for use in emergency situations. However, as of 2024, this page has been removed from the most recently produced passport batches. Instead, An “Important Travel and Safety Data” page featuring a QR code linking to the U.S. Department of State’s official website has been added to replace it, encouraging all holders to enroll in the Smart Traveler Enrollment Program (STEP).

== Application ==
An application is required for the issuance of a passport. If a fugitive being extradited to the United States refuses to sign a passport application, the consular officer can sign it "without recourse."

An application for a United States passport made abroad is forwarded by a U.S. embassy or consulate to Passport Services for processing in the United States. The resulting passport is sent to the embassy or consulate for issuance to the applicant. An emergency passport is issuable by the embassy or consulate. As per Haig v. Agee, the presidential administration may deny or revoke passports for foreign policy or national security reasons at any time.

Places where a U.S. passport may be applied for include some post offices and libraries. Some passports can be renewed online. As of October 2024, the processing time for a regular application is four to six weeks, not including shipping times. Previously, a processing time of six to eight weeks was the norm before the COVID-19 pandemic, which caused passport applications to take as long as 18 weeks to be processed in 2021.

=== Administration ===
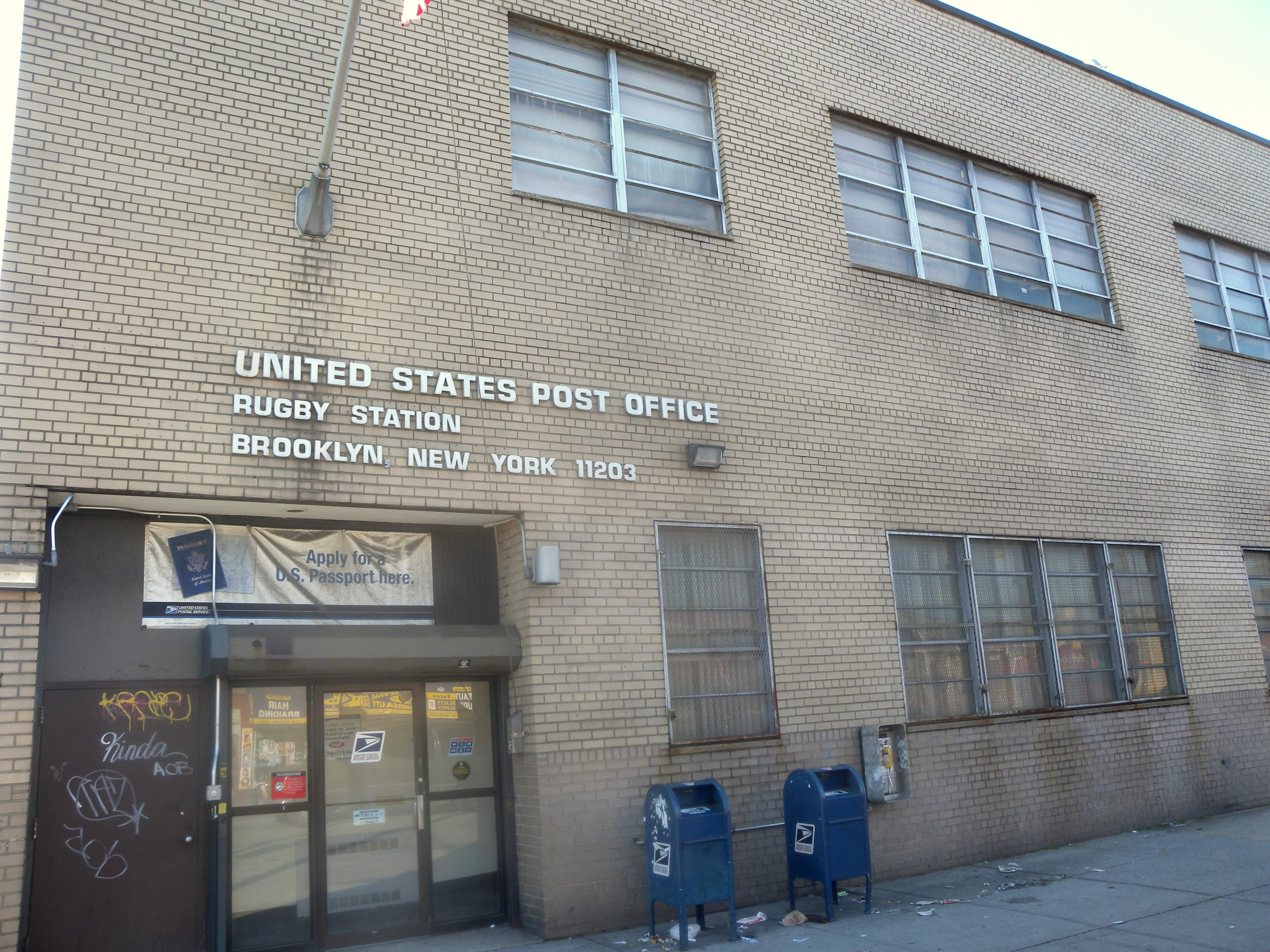
An USPS local office with a passport acceptance facility, USPS offices are the primary locations for processing passport applications across the country

Authority for issuing passports is conferred on the secretary of state by the Passport Act of 1926, subject to such rules as the President of the United States may prescribe. The Department of State has issued regulations governing such passports, and its internal policy concerning issuance of passports, passport waivers, and travel letters is contained in the Foreign Affairs Manual.

Passport Services, a unit of the Bureau of Consular Affairs within the Department of State, is responsible for passport issuance. It operates 26 regional passport agencies that are open to the general public. They are located in Atlanta; Boston; Buffalo; Chicago; Colorado; Dallas; Detroit; El Paso; Honolulu; Hot Springs; Houston; Los Angeles; Miami; Minneapolis; Portsmouth, New Hampshire; New Orleans; New York City; Philadelphia; San Diego; San Francisco; San Juan; Seattle; St. Albans; Stamford; Tucson; and Washington, D.C. Future passport agencies are planned at Salt Lake City; Orlando; Cincinnati; Kansas City, Missouri; San Antonio; and Charlotte. Two additional passport agencies are not open to the general public: one in Charleston, and the Special Issuance Agency in Washington, D.C., which issues official, diplomatic, and no-fee U.S. Passports for U.S. government employees, high-ranking officials, and Peace Corps volunteers.

There are about 9,000 passport acceptance facilities in the United States, designated by Passport Services, at which routine passport applications may be filed. These facilities include United States courts, state courts, post offices, public libraries, county offices, and city offices. In fiscal year 2024, the Department of State issued 24,515,786 passports (including 1,741,527 passport cards) and there were 143,116,633 valid U.S. passports in circulation. The passport possession rate of the U.S. was approximately 48% of the population in June 2024, rising from 5% in 1990.

=== Forms and requirements ===
==== First time application ====
Form DS11 Standard

- The applicant has never been issued a U.S. passport
- The applicant is over age 16
- The applicant was under age 16 when upon the issuance of the applicant's previous passport
- The applicant's recent U.S. passport was issued more than 15 years ago
- The applicant's most recent U.S. passport was lost or stolen
- The applicant's name has changed since the applicant's U.S. passport was issued and the applicant is unable to legally document the change of name

All applicants using a form DS-11 must appear in person, and pay an additional $35 execution fee, in addition to the cost of their passport book and/or card.

==== Renewal or Lost ====
Form DS82 Renewal

The applicant's most recent U.S. passport:

- Is undamaged and can be submitted with the application
- Was issued when the applicant was age 16 or older
- Was issued within the last 15 years
- Was issued in the applicant's current name or the applicant can legally document a change of name

The advantage of the DS-82 passport renewal form is a traveler can mail in the form on their own, and they also do not have to pay the $35 processing fee associated with a DS-11 passport application.

DS64 Lost

Lost or stolen passport requires DS64 in addition to DS11 only if the lost passport is valid due to the second passport rule:

===== Online Renewal =====
The Biden administration issued an executive order in December 2021 requiring the creation of an online passport renewal system. The State Department launched a pilot program in 2022 which received over 500,000 applications before its closure in March 2023. Although the Department found the program successful, some legislators in Congress criticized the technical issues that some customers experienced. Another online renewal pilot was launched in June 2024 and became available to the general public in September. The 2024 pilot addressed key issues from the earlier release, including photo upload errors, made improvements based on ongoing public feedback, and released updates in phases.

In 2025, the Wall Street Journal reported that the online passport renewal program has processed over three million renewals with high user satisfaction handling roughly half of all renewals. This represents a major success in federal digital modernization efforts.

=== Application document requirements for Form DS-11 ===
- Proof of identity (such as a valid state ID)
  - If applying out-of-state, another piece of proof of identity is required.
- Proof of U.S. nationality (such as a previous U.S. passport, birth certificate from a state or US territory, Certificate of Naturalization / Citizenship, or Consular Report of Birth Abroad)
  - If the applicant has been issued a U.S. passport or a Consular Report of Birth Abroad, and is unable or unwilling to submit them, they can request the State Department to perform a "file search". If the aforementioned document was issued prior to 1994, the applicant needs to pay a $150 file search fee for the State Department to manually search the paper records.
- 2 in × 2 in photograph

==== Passport photograph ====
Passport photo requirements are very specific. Official State Department photographic guidelines are available online.

- 2 in × 2 in (5.1 cm × 5.1 cm)
- The height of the head (top of hair to bottom of chin) should measure 1 to 1 3/8 inches (25 to 35 mm)
- Eye height is between 1 1/8 to 1 3/8 inches (29 to 35 mm) from the bottom of the photo
- Front view, full face, open eyes, closed mouth, and neutral expression
- Full head from the top of the hair to the shoulders
- Plain white or off-white background
- No shadows on the face or in the background
- No sunglasses (unless medically necessary). As of November 1, 2016, the wearing of eyeglasses in U.S. passport photos is not allowed.
- No hat or head covering (unless for religious purposes; religious head covering must not obscure hairline)
- Normal contrast and lighting

=== Fees ===
Fees for applying vary based on whether or not an applicant is applying for a new passport or they are renewing an expiring passport. Fees also vary depending on whether an applicant is under the age of 16.

==== Price history ====
A passport fee was first levied in 1856 at one dollar, and over the years remained at or under $10 (including a $1 execution fee introduced in 1920) through 1932. In 1983, the State Department declared that the existing passport fee of $10 was insufficient to cover costs, so the fee was raised from $10 to $35, and new passports were changed to be valid for a decade instead of for five years. The fee for individuals under 18 years of age was also raised from $10 to $20 for a five-year passport. Until that year, passport fees had only been raised by one dollar since 1932. In a 2004 USPS Passport Services publication, "Fees total $85 for adults (16 years and older), with separate payments of $30 to the U.S. Postal Service® for its processing fee and $55 to the Department of State for its passport application fee. For those under 16, the total cost is $70, with separate payments of $30 to the U.S. Postal Service for its processing fee and $40 to the Department of State for its passport application fee."

Prices were again increased in 2010. Fees for a brand-new passport went from $100 to $135 (from $85 to $105 for those under 16), and renewal fees climbed from $75 to $110. Passport cards also saw new and increased fees: $55 for adults and $40 for children. The State Department raised these and other fees after conducting "an exhaustive study of the true cost of providing consular services." In 2018, first-time adult applicants were charged $110 per passport book and $30 per passport card. Additionally, a $35 execution fee was also charged for every first time applications.

==== First-time applications ====
As of December 27, 2021, first-time adult applicants are charged $130 per passport book and $30 per passport card. Additionally, a $35 execution fee is charged per transaction, but only for first applications and not for renewals. This means people applying for the passport book and card simultaneously on the same application pay only one execution fee.

All minor applicants are considered first-time applicants until they reach age 16. Minor applicants pay a $100 application fee for the passport book and a $15 application fee for the passport card. The same $35 execution fee is charged per application.

==== Renewal applications ====
Adults wishing to renew their passports may do so up to five years after expiration at a cost of $130 for the passport book and $30 for the passport card. Passports for minors under age 16 cannot be renewed.

===== Special renewal rules =====
If a person is already in possession of a passport book and would like a passport card additionally (or vice versa), they may submit their currently valid passport book or card as evidence of citizenship and apply for a renewal to avoid paying a $35 execution fee. However, if the passport book or card holder is unable or unwilling to relinquish their currently valid passport for the duration of the processing, they may submit other primary evidence of citizenship, such as a U.S. birth certificate or naturalization certificate, and apply as a first time applicant, paying the execution fee and submitting a written explanation as to why they are applying in this manner.

==== Additional fees ====
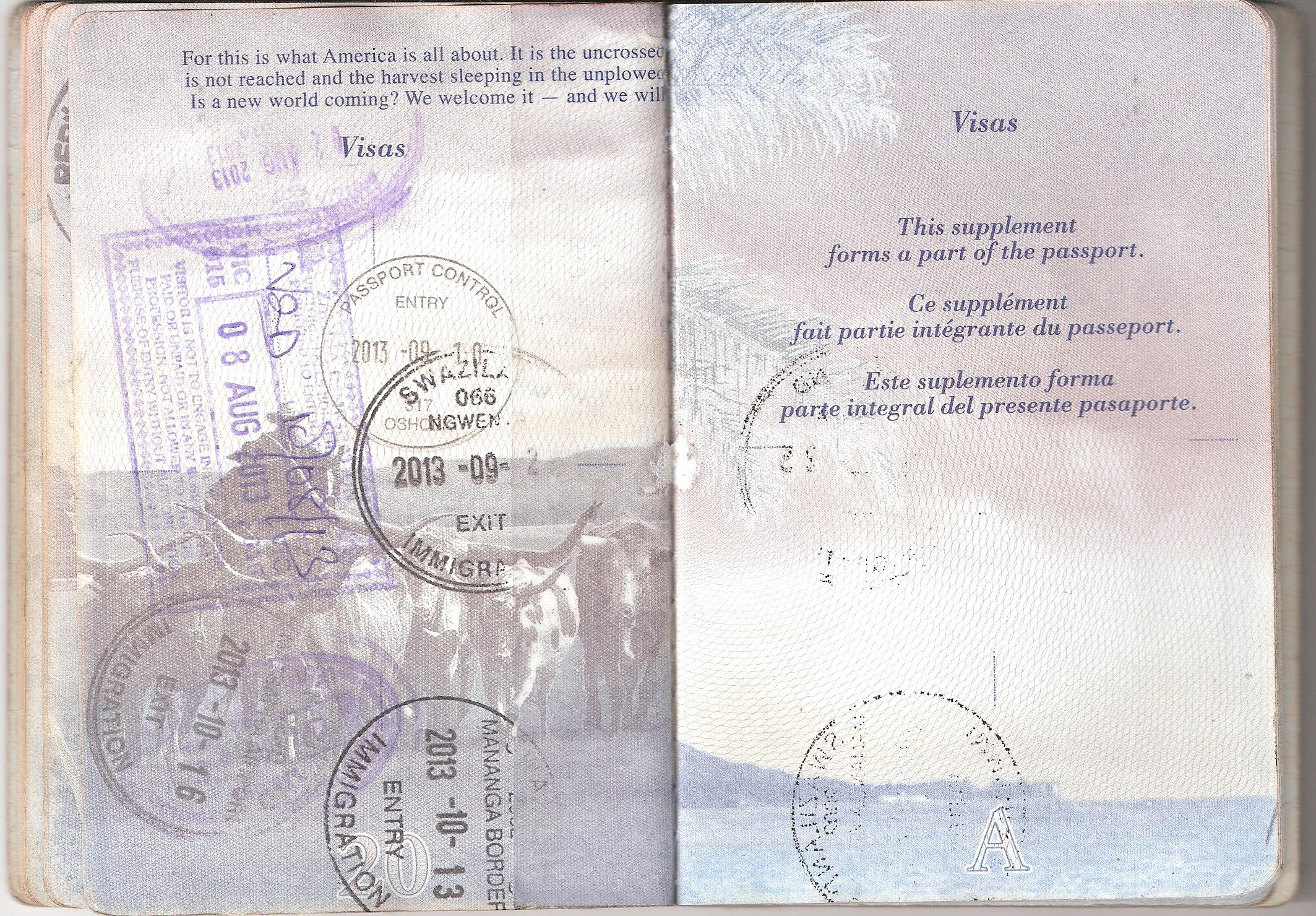
Extra pages added to a U.S. passport, along with immigration stamps from Swaziland, Zambia, and South Africa.

- An expedite fee of $60 is charged when applicants request faster processing, regardless of age. This processing is currently 2–3 weeks when applying at an acceptance facility. The same fee is charged for expedited service when applying at a Passport Agency within 14 days of travel.
- In addition to the expedite fee, applicants may pay an additional $22.05 to receive their passport 1–2 days after it is mailed. This can be paid in combination with the application fee when applying, or added later by calling the National Passport Information Center. However, 1-2 day mail return is only available for the U.S. Passport Book. Passport cards may not be overnight mailed.
- As of January 1, 2016, passports may no longer have pages added to them. When applying for a new passport, applicants may apply for a 28-page or 52-page passport, with no additional cost for obtaining the 52-page passport.
- If an applicant requests a "file search" for a previously-issued U.S. passport or Consular Report of Birth Abroad, and if the said document was issued prior to 1994, then the applicant needs to pay $150 as the "file search fee".

== Foreign travel ==
=== Restrictions ===
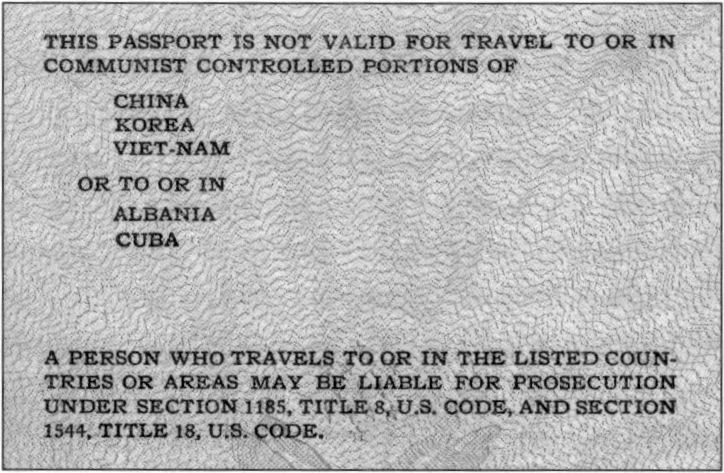
Travel bans to the Communist states during Cold War

It is unlawful to enter or exit the United States without a valid passport or passport-replacement document compliant with the Western Hemisphere Travel Initiative (WHTI), or without an exception or waiver.

The use of passports may be restricted for foreign policy reasons. In September 1939, in order to preserve the United States' neutrality in relation to the breakout of World War II, then secretary of state Cordell Hull issued regulations declaring that outstanding passports, together with passports issued thereafter, could not be used for travel to Europe without specific validation by the Department of State, and such validation could not last more than six months. Similar restrictions can still be invoked upon notice given in the Federal Register, and such notice was issued in 2017, so that passports were "declared invalid for travel to, in, or through the DPRK unless specially validated for such travel."

As confirmed in Haig v. Agee (1981), the administration may deny or revoke passports for foreign policy or national security reasons at any time, and for other reasons as prescribed by regulations. A notable example of enforcement of this was the 1948 denial of a passport to U.S. representative Leo Isacson, who sought to go to Paris to attend a conference as an observer for the American Council for a Democratic Greece, a Communist front organization, because of the group's role in opposing the Greek government in the Greek Civil War. Denial or revocation of a passport does not prevent the use of outstanding valid passports. The physical revocation of a passport is often difficult, and an apparently valid passport can be used for travel until officially taken by an arresting officer or by a court.

The lack of a valid passport (for whatever reason, including revocation) does not render the U.S. citizen either unable to leave the United States, or inadmissible into the United States. The United States is a signatory of the International Covenant on Civil and Political Rights, which guarantees residents of its signatories wide-ranging rights to enter or depart their own countries. In Nguyen v. INS, the Supreme Court stated that U.S. citizens are entitled "to the absolute right to enter its borders." Lower federal courts went as far as to declare that "the Government cannot say to its citizen, standing beyond its border, that his reentry into the land of his allegiance is a criminal offense; and this we conclude is a sound principle whether or not the citizen has a passport, and however wrongful may have been his conduct in effecting his departure." Therefore, even in the absence of a valid passport, U.S. citizens cannot be denied entry into the United States, though they may be delayed while the CBP attempts to verify their identity and citizenship status.

The U.S. does not exercise passport control on exit from the country, so an individual attempting to depart from the U.S. only needs to have valid documents granting the right to entry into the country of destination. In most cases, these are inspected at check-in before the individual can be issued a boarding pass by an airline or cruise operator/shipping company, or by immigration authorities at Canadian or Mexican ports of entry on land.

Travel of U.S. citizens and nationals around the United States and across its international borders is generally controlled by means other than passports, such as the No Fly List.

=== Visa requirements map ===
Visa requirements for United States citizens for holders of regular United States passports United States and its territories Right of abode by the Compact of Free Association Visa not required / ETA (Note: ETA required for Australia, Israel, Kenya, Mozambique, New Zealand, Saint Kitts and Nevis, Seychelles and the United Kingdom) Visa not required (conditional) Visa available both on arrival or online Visa on arrival eVisa Visa required Travel restricted (either by local law or US regulations) or admission refused

Visa requirements for United States citizens are administrative entry restrictions by the authorities of other states placed on citizens of the United States. As of June 2025, holders of a United States passport can visit 182 countries and territories without a visa or with a visa on arrival, ranking it tenth in terms of travel freedom according to the Henley Passport Index. Additionally, Arton Capital's Passport Index ranked the United States passport fourth in the world in terms of travel freedom, with a visa-free score of 160 (tied with Belgium, New Zealand, Poland, Portugal, Spain, and Switzerland), as of June 2025. The United States Passport is ranked 9th by the Global Passport Power Rank. The United States government has prohibited all U.S. nationals from traveling to North Korea without special permission, making all United States passports invalid for travel to, in, or through the country.

=== Foreign travel statistics ===
These are the numbers of visits by U.S. nationals to various countries in 2015 (unless otherwise noted):

Destination	Number of visitors
American Samoa (Note: Data for 2016)	17,560
Angola	17,259
Anguilla (Note: Data for 2017)	44,983
Antarctica	14,893
Antigua and Barbuda	96,347
Aruba (Note: Data for 2014)	576,793
Australia	781,000
Austria (Note: Counting only guests in tourist accommodation establishments.)	702,900
Azerbaijan	15,178
Bahamas	1,159,259
Barbados	168,945
Belgium	299,907
Belize	254,544
Bermuda	551,976
Bhutan	9,220
Bolivia	58,403
Bosnia and Herzegovina	25,926
Botswana	49,451
Brazil	475,232
British Virgin Islands (Note: Data for 2013)	442,434
Bulgaria	90,963
Burkina Faso	5,611
Cambodia	238,658
Cameroon	13,280
Canada	24,335,415
Cape Verde	4,282
Caribbean Netherlands: (Note: Data for arrivals by air only.): Bonaire; Saba; Sint Eustatius	5,900; 2,000; 2,700; 1,200
Cayman Islands	340,955
Chile	211,718
China	2,312,900
Colombia	529,013
Congo (Note: Data for 2012)	5,352
Cook Islands	8,372
Costa Rica	1,199,241
Croatia	451,947
Cuba	91,254
Curacao	59,714
Cyprus	25,388
Czech Republic	539,023
Dominica	17,773
Dominican Republic	2,073,963
Ecuador	259,406
El Salvador (Note: Excluding one-day visits)	447,628
Estonia	38,381
Eswatini	18,014
Fiji	81,198
Finland	124,997
France	3,622,362
French Polynesia	51,095
Gambia	4,058
Georgia	42,645
Germany	2,558,495
Greece	750,250
Greenland	2,767
Grenada	67,250
Guam	77,058
Guatemala	447,140
Guyana (Note: Data for 2010)	82,966
Haiti (Note: Data for 2007)	266,793
Hong Kong	1,215,629
Hungary	275,314
Iceland	576,403
Indonesia	316,782
India	1,376,919
Ireland	1,294,000
Israel	778,600
Italy	3,567,000
Jamaica	1,509,963
Japan	1,375,000
Jordan	166,441
Kazakhstan	29,632
Kiribati	1,319
Kyrgyzstan	14,200
Laos	38,765
Latvia	44,760
Lebanon	154,095
Lesotho	10,026
Lithuania	35,300
Luxembourg	32,144
Macau	186,378
Madagascar	4,165
Malaysia	198,203
Maldives	39,180
Malta	35,758
Malawi (Note: Data for 2009)	36,386
Mali	4,479
Martinique	6,463
Marshall Islands	1,546
Mauritius	9,655
Mexico	10,340,463
Micronesia	6,906
Moldova	21,878
Mongolia	16,684
Montenegro	18,874
Montserrat	1,665
Myanmar	76,502
Namibia	26,339
Nepal	42,687
Netherlands	1,450,000
New Caledonia	639
New Zealand	330,128
Niue	239
Nicaragua	288,538
North Macedonia	11,495
Northern Mariana Islands	8,528
Oman	58,598
Pakistan	73,129
Palau	7,546
Panama	338,590
Papua New Guinea	12,181
Paraguay	19,479
Peru	598,685
Philippines	957,813
Poland	474,100
Qatar	101,144
Romania	175,667
Russia	293,011
São Tomé and Príncipe (Note: Data for 2005)	154
Saint Lucia	152,738
Saint Vincent and the Grenadines	22,324
Samoa	10,177
Serbia	34,169
Seychelles	6,038
Singapore	565,250
Sint Maarten	236,379
Slovakia	45,670
Slovenia	95,863
Solomon Islands	1,623
South Africa	297,226
South Korea	868,881
Spain	2,650,068
Sri Lanka	57,479
Suriname	6,827
Taiwan	577,628
Tajikistan (Note: Data for 2019)	6,300
Tanzania	86,860
Thailand	1,056,124
Timor-Leste (Note: Data for arrivals by air only.)	2,557
Tonga	8,761
Trinidad and Tobago	161,539
Tunisia	13,896
Turkey	329,257
Turkmenistan	660
Turks and Caicos	315,247
Tuvalu	138
Uganda	57,959
Ukraine	153,778
United Arab Emirates	633,000
United Kingdom	3,308,000
Uzbekistan	17,160
Vanuatu	3,016
Venezuela	70,457
Vietnam	614,117
Zambia (Note: Data for 2015)	38,496
Zimbabwe	66,577

== See also ==
- Five Nations Passport Group
- Iroquois passport
- Real ID Act
- Ruth Shipley, head of the Passport Division, 1928 to 1955
- Visa policy of the United States
- Visa requirements for United States citizens

== Bibliography ==
- International Civil Aviation Organization, Machine Readable Travel Documents, MRTD - Machine Readable Travel Document.
- Krueger, Stephen. "U.S. Passport-Application Forms (2025)" https://ssrn.com/abstract=5242368 "U.S. Passport-Application Forms (2020-2023)" https://ssrn.com/abstract=4000007 "Passports in the Twenty-First Century" https://ssrn.com/abstract=1458092 "Basics of United States Passport Law" https://ssrn.com/abstract=5169987 "Material on United States Passport Law" https://ssrn.com/abstract=5170026 "Bibliography: Passports" https://ssrn.com/abstract=3006404 "The Constitutional Authority of the United States to Impede International Travel by Citizens" https://ssrn.com/abstract=5274939.
- Lloyd, Martin (2008) [2003]. The Passport: The History of Man's Most Travelled Document (2nd ed.). Canterbury: Queen Anne's Fan. ISBN 978-0-9547150-3-8. OCLC 220013999.
- Salter, Mark B. (2003). Rights of Passage: The Passport in International Relations. Boulder, Co: Lynne Rienner Publishers. ISBN 978-1-58826-145-8. OCLC 51518371.
- Torpey, John C. (2000). The Invention of the Passport: Surveillance, Citizenship and the State. Cambridge studies in law and society. Cambridge: Cambridge University Press. ISBN 0-521-63249-8. OCLC 59408523.
- United States; Hunt, Gaillard (1898). The American Passport; Its History and a Digest of Laws, Rulings and Regulations Governing Its Issuance by the Department of State. Washington: Govt. print. off. OCLC 3836079.
- United States Department of State, Bureau of Consular Affairs, Photographer's Guide. (archive)
- United States Department of State, Foreign Affairs Manual, "8 FAM FAM Passports and Consular Reports of Birth Abroad"
- United States Department of State, Passport Office, The United States Passport: Past, Present, Future (Washington, D.C.: United States Department of State, Passport Office, 1976).
- United States Department of State, Passports, Passport Home.
- 22 C.F.R. Part 51.
- 8 U.S.C. secs. 1185, 1504.
- 18 U.S.C. secs. 1541–1547.
- 22 U.S.C. secs. 211a–218, 2705, 2721.
- U.S. Sentencing Guidelines secs. 2L2.1, 2L2.2.
