= Postal Clause =

Clause to establish a US postal system

Article I, Section 8, Clause 7, of the United States Constitution, the Postal Clause, authorizes the establishment of "post offices and post roads" by the country's legislature, the Congress. As one of Congress's enumerated powers listed in the Constitution's first article, the clause has been invoked as the constitutional basis for the United States Post Office Department and its successor, the United States Postal Service.

== Text ==
The Congress shall have Power...To establish Post Offices and post Roads;

== History ==
The Postal Clause was added to the Constitution to facilitate interstate communication as well as to create a source of revenue for the early United States. There were some early disagreements as to the boundaries of the postal power. John Jay, in a letter to George Washington, opined that the postal service should not be burdened with the responsibility for handling newspaper delivery, and also suggested that the Post Office be placed under the supervision of the executive branch (a suggestion which later led to the creation of the Post Office Department). Thomas Jefferson feared that the postal service would become a source of patronage and a waste of money. Jefferson also expressed doubt at granting Congress the power to designate post roads, as he considered road building to be a state responsibility.

== Interpretation ==
The clause has been construed to give Congress the enumerated power to designate mail routes and construct or designate post offices, with the implied authority to carry, deliver, and regulate the mail of the United States as a whole. An early controversy was whether Congress had the power to actually build post roads and post offices, or merely designate which lands and roads were to be used for this purpose, and to what extent that power could be delegated to the Postmaster General. The U.S. Supreme Court construed the power narrowly during the early part of the 19th century, holding that the power consisted mostly for the designation of roads and sites, but gradually gave way later on allowing appropriation of land for postal purposes, culminating in Kohl v. United States (1876).

The postal clause has also been interpreted to authorize statutes designating certain materials as non-mailable and criminalizing abuses of the postal system (such as mail fraud and armed robbery of post offices). This power has been used by Congress and the Postmaster General to proscribe obscene materials from the mail, beginning with an act to ban lottery circulars in 1872 and the Comstock laws in 1873. These attempts at limiting the content of the mail were upheld by the Supreme Court, but in the 20th century, the court took a more assertive approach in striking down postal laws which limited free expression, particularly as it related to political materials. The court construed the First Amendment as providing a check on the postal power.

== See also ==
- Ex parte Jackson
- In re Debs
- U.S. Postal Service v. Council of Greenburgh Civic Associations
