= McCarty v. McCarty =

- Supreme Court of the United States

Decided June 26, 1981
- Full case name: McCarty v. McCarty
- Citations: 453 U.S. 210 (more)

Holding
- Federal law precluded a state court from dividing military retired pay pursuant to state community property laws.

Court membership
- Chief Justice Warren E. Burger Associate Justices William J. Brennan Jr. · Potter Stewart; Byron White · Thurgood Marshall; Harry Blackmun · Lewis F. Powell Jr. William Rehnquist · John P. Stevens

Case opinions
- Majority: Blackmun
- Dissent: Rehnquist, joined by Brennan, Stewart

Laws applied
- Supremacy Clause
- Abrogated by
- Uniformed Services Former Spouses Protection Act (1983)

McCarty v. McCarty, 453 U.S. 210 (1981), was a United States Supreme Court case in which the court held that federal law precluded a state court from dividing a military pension pursuant to state community property laws. Congress abrogated this decision by passing the Uniformed Services Former Spouses Protection Act in 1983.

== Background ==
A regular commissioned officer of the United States Army who retires after 20 years of service is entitled to retired pay. Retired pay terminates with the officer's death, although he may designate a beneficiary to receive any arrearages that remain unpaid at death. In addition, there are statutory plans that allow the officer to set aside a portion of his retired pay for his survivors. Richard John McCarty, a Regular Army Colonel, filed a petition in California Superior Court to divorce Patricia Ann McCarty. At the time, he had served approximately 18 of the 20 years required for retirement with pay. Under California law, each spouse, upon dissolution of a marriage, has an equal and absolute right to a half interest in all community and quasi-community property, but retains their separate property. In his petition, the colonel requested that his military retirement benefits be confirmed to him as his separate property. However, The superior court ruled that such benefits were subject to division as quasi-community property and ordered the colonel to pay the spouse a specified portion of the benefits upon retirement. Subsequently, the colonel retired and began receiving retired pay; under the dissolution decree, the spouse was entitled to approximately 45% of the retired pay. On review of this award, the California Court of Appeal affirmed, rejecting the colonel's contention that, because the federal scheme of military retirement benefits preempts state community property law, the Supremacy Clause precluded the trial court from awarding the spouse a portion of his retired pay.

== Opinion of the court ==
The Supreme Court issued an opinion on June 26, 1981.

== Later developments ==
In response to this case and Hisquierdo v. Hisquierdo (1979), when the court held the same for military pensions, Congress passed the Uniformed Services Former Spouses Protection Act in 1983. Because of that act, these pensions are divisible as community property, so both of these decisions are abrogated.
