= Hisquierdo v. Hisquierdo =

- Supreme Court of the United States

Decided January 22, 1979
- Full case name: Hisquierdo v. Hisquierdo
- Citations: 439 U.S. 572 (more)

Holding
- Railroad pensions were not subject to division upon divorce because they were not community property.

Court membership
- Chief Justice Warren E. Burger Associate Justices William J. Brennan Jr. · Potter Stewart; Byron White · Thurgood Marshall; Harry Blackmun · Lewis F. Powell Jr. William Rehnquist · John P. Stevens

Case opinions
- Majority: Blackmun
- Dissent: Stewart, joined by Rehnquist

Laws applied
- Railroad Retirement Act of 1974
- Abrogated by
- Uniformed Services Former Spouses Protection Act (1983)

Hisquierdo v. Hisquierdo, 439 U.S. 572 (1979), was a United States Supreme Court case in which the court held that railroad pensions were not subject to division upon divorce because they were not community property. Congress abrogated this decision by passing the Uniformed Services Former Spouses Protection Act in 1983.

== Background ==
The Railroad Retirement Act of 1974 provided retirement benefits for railroad employees. The benefits were not contractual and could be altered by Congress at any time. Benefits for an employee's spouse terminated upon an absolute divorce under 45 U.S.C. § 231d(c)(3). Except for satisfying child support or alimony obligations, 45 U.S.C. § 231m stipulated that "no annuity [under the act] shall be assignable or be subject to any tax or to garnishment, attachment, or other legal process under any circumstances whatsoever, nor shall the payment thereof be anticipated...."

Jess H. Hisquierdo, a California resident whose years of service as a railroad employee entitled him to benefits under the Act if and when he attained age 60, petitioned to divorce Angela Hisquierdo, also a resident of California. Because California is a community property state, the trial court divided the parties' community property, but it held that the spouse had no interest in the employee's expectation of receiving railroad retirement benefits. The Supreme Court of California reversed, holding that, because the benefits would flow in part from employee's employment during marriage, they were community property. The court rejected the employee's contention that § 231m barred the spouse's claim, reasoning that the provision was intended to apply to creditors only.

== Opinion of the court ==
The Supreme Court issued an opinion on January 22, 1979.

== Later developments ==
In response to this case and McCarty v. McCarty (1981), when the court held the same for military pensions, Congress passed the Uniformed Services Former Spouses Protection Act in 1983. Because of that act, these pensions are divisible as community property, so both of these decisions are abrogated.
