= Emma Lu Davis =

American sculptor and painter

- Emma Lu Davis in 1942
- Born: November 26, 1905; Indianapolis, Indiana
- Died: October 19, 1988 (aged 82); San Diego, California
- Education: Vassar College; Pennsylvania Academy of Fine Arts; UCLA
- Known for: Sculpture, painting

Emma Lu Davis (also spelled Emma Lou Davis; 1905–1988) was an American sculptor, painter, and anthropologist.

== Biography ==
=== Early life and education ===
Davis was born in Indianapolis on November 26, 1905. After graduating from Vassar College in 1927, she studied for three years at the Pennsylvania Academy of Fine Arts.

=== Career ===
After leaving school, Davis spent three years as a freelancer working on a variety of commissions. In 1933 she spent six months studying modern techniques and design under Buckminster Fuller at the Dymaxion factory in Bridgeport, Connecticut. At the factory, she wrote later that she learned "the principles of good workmanship. I think there are a great many 'artists' but awfully few real craftsmen. Use of tools and neat, fast, strong construction are not taught much in art schools." It was there that she learned how to work with wood, and began experimenting with abstract forms. Her figurative sculptures from the 1930s reflect her interest in the naive art of various folk cultures; for example, "Grotesque Bull" (shown), a terra cotta sculpture which was included in Dorothy Miller's "Americans 1942" exhibition at the Museum of Modern Art.

Grotesque Bull, 1934

Unemployment Compensation (1940), granite relief at the Wilbur J. Cohen Federal Building

Family Group (1940), granite relief at the Wilbur J. Cohen Federal Building

In spring 1935 Davis traveled to Russia to learn how Russian artists were organized and how socialized patronage affected their work. She concluded that Soviet artists failed to innovate because "the cheap academic traditions have been continued under the name of 'socialist realism'—that is, all the facts and none of the meaning of the subject."

From 1938 to 1941 Davis was the artist in residence at Reed College in Portland, Oregon. She described this period as "the most profitable and enjoyable three years of my life." In 1939 she was commissioned by the federal Treasury Section of Fine Arts to paint a mural, Missouri Livestock, for the post office in La Plata, Missouri. Two years later she collaborated with Henry Kreis on a series of low-relief granite sculptures depicting the benefits of social security for the overdoor panels of the Wilbur J. Cohen Federal Building in Washington, D.C. During World War II, Davis worked at Douglas Aircraft Company in Long Beach, California as a draftsman and aircraft designer.

After practicing as a commercial artist for thirty years, Davis decided to retrain as an archaeologist. She completed her Ph.D. at the University of California, Los Angeles in 1965, writing a dissertation titled Anasazi Mobility and Mesa Verde Migrations (1964). She worked Science Direction at the San Diego Museum of Man, while continuing her desert studies, focusing on the southern California region of China Lake. Prior to her retirement, she established the Great Basin Foundation, which conducted paleo-environmental research. According to Joseph L. Chartkoff, Davis was "one of the most important figures in bringing scientific rigor and credibility to Paleoindian archaeology in California."

=== Death and legacy ===
Davis died in San Diego on October 19, 1988. Her artwork is included in the collections of the Museum of Modern Art, the Whitney Museum of American Art, and other public and private collections.

== Selected exhibitions ==
- Solo exhibition at the Peiping Institute of Fine Arts, Beiping, China, 1937
- Boyer Galleries, New York, 1937
- Pennsylvania Academy of Fine Arts, 1938 and 1939
- 1939 New York World's Fair
- Americans 1942: 18 Artists from 9 States, Museum of Modern Art, 1942
- Recent Acquisitions: The Work of Young Americans, Museum of Modern Art, 1943
- The Permanent Collection—Women Artists, Whitney Museum of American Art, 1970
- Painting and Sculpture Changes 2011, Museum of Modern Art, 2011

== Selected writings ==
- Davis, Emma Lou (1961). "The Mono Craters Petroglyphs, California". American Antiquity. 27 (2): 236–239. doi:10.2307/277842. JSTOR 277842. S2CID 163849702.
- Davis, Emma Lou (1963). "The Desert Culture of the Western Great Basin: A Lifeway of Seasonal Transhumance". American Antiquity. 29 (2): 202–212. doi:10.2307/278490. JSTOR 278490. S2CID 162252113.
- Gurvich, I. S.; Davis, Emma Lou (1963). "Current Ethnic Processes Taking Place in Northern Yakutia". Arctic Anthropology. 1 (2): 86–92. JSTOR 40315563.
- Davis, Emma Lou (1965). "Art is Here to Stay". Science. 148 (3673): 1042. Bibcode:1965Sci...148.1042D. doi:10.1126/science.148.3673.1042-a. JSTOR 1716838. PMID 17820105.
- Davis, Emma Lou; Winslow, Sylvia (1965). "Giant Ground Figures of the Prehistoric Deserts". Proceedings of the American Philosophical Society. 109 (1): 8–21. JSTOR 985774.
- Davis, Emma Lou (1965). "Small Pressures and Cultural Drift as Explanations for Abandonment of the San Juan Area, New Mexico and Arizona". American Antiquity. 30 (3): 353–355. doi:10.2307/278819. JSTOR 278819. S2CID 163820209.
- Davis, Emma Lou (1967). "Man and Water at Pleistocene Lake Mohave". American Antiquity. 32 (3): 345–353. doi:10.2307/2694663. JSTOR 2694663. S2CID 162906057.
- Davis, Emma Lou (1975). "The 'Exposed Archaeology' of China Lake, California". American Antiquity. 40 (1): 39–53. doi:10.2307/279267. JSTOR 279267. S2CID 161920401.
