= Commonwealth Edison Co. v. Montana =

Commonwealth Edison Company v. Montana
- Supreme Court of the United States

Argued March 30, 1981 Decided July 2, 1981
- Full case name: Commonwealth Edison Company, et al. v. Montana, et al.
- Citations: 453 U.S. 609 (more) 101 S. Ct. 2946; 69 L. Ed. 2d 884; 1981 U.S. LEXIS 43; 40 P.U.R.4th 159; 70 Oil & Gas Rep. 182

Case history
- Prior: Commonwealth Edison Co. v. State, 189 Mont. 191, 615 P.2d 847 (Mont. 1980); probable jurisdiction noted, 449 U.S. 1033 (1980).
- Subsequent: Rehearing denied, 453 U.S. 927 (1981).

Holding
- The Montana severance tax does not violate the Commerce Clause or the Supremacy Clause.

Court membership
- Chief Justice Warren E. Burger Associate Justices William J. Brennan Jr. · Potter Stewart; Byron White · Thurgood Marshall; Harry Blackmun · Lewis F. Powell Jr. William Rehnquist · John P. Stevens

Case opinions
- Majority: Marshall, joined by Burger, Brennan, Stewart, White, Rehnquist
- Concurrence: White
- Dissent: Blackmun, joined by Powell, Stevens

Laws applied
- U.S. Const. art. VI, U.S. Const. art. 1, § 8

Commonwealth Edison Co. v. Montana, 453 U.S. 609 (1981), is a 6-to-3 ruling by the Supreme Court of the United States that held that a severance tax in Montana does not violate the Commerce Clause or the Supremacy Clause of the United States Constitution.

== Background ==
In 1975, concerned that Montana was a "stereotypical colonial state" with little economic development whose natural resources would be extracted and the state left with severe environmental degradation, the Montana State Legislature enacted a severance tax on each ton of coal mined in the state. Then-Governor Tom Judge called the statute "the most significant piece of legislation enacted in Montana in this century." It was attacked in a RAND Corporation study (partly financed by the National Academies of Science) as excessive. An amendment was proposed and adopted in 1976 requiring that at least one-fourth of the coal severance tax be deposited into a Permanent Coal Tax Trust Fund and that, after 1979, at least half the tax revenues be deposited into the fund. The fund could not be tapped unless three-fourths of each chamber of the state legislature voted to do so. The tax, levied on the cost "at the mine mouth," varied depending on the market value of the coal, the coal's energy content, and the method of extraction. Generally speaking, most sub-bituminous coal was taxed at a rate of 30% and lignite coal at 20%.

Coal producers in Montana and 11 out-of-state utilities (including Commonwealth Edison) challenged the constitutionality of the severance tax, arguing it was invalid under the Commerce and Supremacy Clauses of the U.S. Constitution. The Montana state district court for Lewis and Clark County dismissed the complaint in July 1979. Montana State Attorney General Mike Greely hailed the decision, declaring "Montana will never again roll over and play dead when big outside interests decide to take our resources." The plaintiffs appealed to the Montana Supreme Court. Additional Midwestern utilities joined the suit, claiming that the state of Montana was acting like OPEC and accusing Montanans of being "blue-eyed Arabs". The Montana Supreme Court upheld the tax's constitutionality on July 17, 1980. The utilities appealed, and the U.S. Supreme Court granted certiorari in December 1980.

== Ruling ==
=== Majority ===
Justice Marshall wrote the decision for the majority. He was joined by Chief Justice Burger and Justices Brennan, Stewart, White and Rehnquist.

Justice Marshall addressed the Commerce Clause issue first. The majority agreed with Commonwealth Edison's claim that, even though a tax is imposed before the goods become interstate commerce, this does not mean the tax evades constitutional analysis. Rejecting the reasoning in Heisler v. Thomas Colliery Co., the majority "disapproved" of any distinction between intrastate and interstate commerce based on the idea that the Commerce Clause denies states the right to burden interstate commerce, and concluded that state severance taxes came under the jurisdiction of the Constitution's Commerce Clause. The respondents argued that the appropriate test for evaluating a tax under the Commerce Clause should be the four-prong test set forth in Complete Auto Transit, Inc. v. Brady, and that the Montana tax violated the third prong of the Complete Auto Transit test by discriminating against out-of-state consumers of Montana's coal. But the majority concluded no discrimination existed, because the tax burden was borne equally by all out-of-state consumers. The appellants also argued the tax violated the fourth prong of the test because it was not "fairly related to the services provided by the State" (e.g., the amount of the tax collected exceeds the cost of services provided). But the majority disagreed: Commonwealth Edison had fundamentally misconstrued the Court's test in Complete Auto. The Montana Supreme Court had characterized the severance tax as intended for general government purposes, a finding the U.S. Supreme Court refused to dispute. Thus, there could be no "excessiveness" test. Nor was there any question that the state of Montana had the right to levy the tax for the purposes it did. Justice Marshall next identified how the fourth prong of the Complete Auto test should be interpreted:

The relevant inquiry under the fourth prong of the Complete Auto Transit test is not, as appellants suggest, the amount of the tax or the value of the benefits allegedly bestowed as measured by the costs the State incurs on account of the taxpayer's activities. Rather, the test is closely connected to the first prong of the Complete Auto Transit test. Under this threshold test, the interstate business must have a substantial nexus with the State before any tax may be levied on it. See National Bellas Hess, Inc. v. Illinois Revenue Dept., 386 U.S. 753 (1967). Beyond that threshold requirement, the fourth prong of the Complete Auto Transit test imposes the additional limitation that the measure of the tax must be reasonably related to the extent of the contact, since it is the activities or presence of the taxpayer in the State that may properly be made to bear a "just share of state tax burden," Western Live Stock v. Bureau of Revenue, 303 U.S., at 254. See National Geographic Society v. California Board of Equalization, 430 U.S. 551 (1977); Standard Pressed Steel Co. v. Washington Revenue Dept., 419 U.S. 560 (1975).

The Court held that the Montana severance tax easily met this test. The Court refused to decide whether a tax could ever be "too high" under the Constitution, leaving this judgment expressly to the legislative branch.

Justice Marshall next addressed whether the tax violated the Supremacy Clause. The first contention was that the tax interfered with the purposes of the Mineral Lands Leasing Act of 1920, 30 U.S.C. § 181 et seq., as amended by the Federal Coal Leasing Amendments Act of 1975, P.L. 94-377. But the Court observed that the Mineral Lands Leasing Act of 1920 expressly authorizes states to impose severance and excise taxes on coal mined from federal land, and that the Supreme Court had agreed with this interpretation of the law in Mid-Northern Oil Co. v. Walker. There was nothing in the legislative history of either the 1920 Act or the 1975 Amendments to indicate otherwise; indeed, if a state severance tax were found to interfere with federal leases, all such taxes (of any amount) would have to be enjoined—an outcome Congress clearly did not intend. Appellants had also argued that the Montana tax "frustrated" the broad goals of national energy policy, but the Court refused to agree on two grounds. First, the Court would not overturn a state act unless "the nature of the regulated subject matter permits no other conclusion, or that the Congress has unmistakably so ordained." Second, the Supreme Court found that during debates over recent national energy legislation Congress had been fully cognizant of the Montana tax and had refused to take action to pre-empt it or ameliorate its impact on other states.

In a brief concurrence, Justice White called the issues involved "troubling". Nonetheless, "Congress has the power to protect interstate commerce from intolerable or even undesirable burdens," he wrote, and "The constitutional authority and the machinery to thwart efforts such as those of Montana, if thought unacceptable, are available to Congress... . As I presently see it, therefore, the better part of both wisdom and valor is to respect the judgment of the other branches of the Government."

=== Dissent ===
Justice Blackmun dissented, joined by Justices Powell and Stevens.

For Justice Blackmun, the issue was whether the Montana severance tax constituted a "tailored tax" in violation of the test in Complete Auto Transit. He was deeply troubled by the fact that Montana had control over one-quarter of the nation's coal reserves and nearly total control of the nation's low-sulfur coal reserves, and that most of these reserves lay under land controlled by the federal government. In addition, Blackmun argued there was a "tension" in the Court's ruling as to whether interstate commerce should be relatively unhindered from interference by state taxation and whether states should be allowed to recoup costs associated with interstate commerce. Blackmun agreed with the majority that the tax was not discriminatory. But he disagreed that the tax did not burden interstate commerce, characterizing the majority's ruling as making Montana free "to tax this coal at 100% or even 1,000% of value, should it choose to do so." Blackmun characterized the majority's decision as "mechanical," and claimed it was not in step with prior Court rulings on burdensome taxation. Blackmun further argued that the Montana severance tax was a "tailored tax" because it only taxed coal destined for interstate commerce, and thus deserved stricter scrutiny under the Complete Auto test. Accordingly, given the economic conditions and importance of national energy policy, Blackmun would have remanded the case for trial for further determination of these issues. Blackmun agreed with the majority, however, that there was no Supremacy Clause issue.

== Further developments and rulings ==
Beginning in 1987, Montana reduced its tax on bituminous coal to 15% and on lignite coal to 10%, and exempting the first 20,000 tons (later, 50,000 tons) of coal mined from any tax whatsoever. In 1992, the state legislature created a "Treasure State Endowment Trust Fund" under the Permanent Coal Tax Trust Fund, and diverted money from the Permanent Fund into the Endowment Fund for the purposes of supporting local government. A 1999 state law subsequently enacted a "licensing fee" equal to 50% of the severance tax, and allowed each coal mining company to apply up to 101% of the license against the severance tax (effectively halving the tax on coal mined in the state). A coalitions of citizens sued, arguing this illegally diverted funds from the Permanent Trust. In Montanans for the Coal Trust v. State, the Montana Supreme Court agreed and enjoined the licensing law.

The U.S. Supreme Court had a second occasion to address issues with the Montana coal severance tax in 1998. In 1904, the Crow Tribe ceded part of its tribal reservation back to the government of the United States. The federal government continued to hold the mineral rights under these lands in trust for the tribe. Montana's coal severance tax applied to coal mined on both the ceded federal land as well as land beneath the Crow Tribe. The Crow Tribe sued, claiming that the Montana tax impinged on their tribal sovereignty and was pre-empted by federal law. In the landmark Indian law case, Montana v. Crow Tribe of Indians, the U.S. Supreme Court disagreed on both counts, reversing the previous judgments of the Ninth Circuit.

== Assessment ==
Commonwealth Edison Co. v. Montana has been criticized by legal scholars for overturning Heisler v. Thomas Colliery Co. and subsequent rulings.

Other legal scholars criticize the ruling for, in their view, undermining the importance of the fourth prong of the Complete Auto Transit test.
