= In re Debs =

- Supreme Court of the United States

Argued March 25–26, 1895 Decided May 27, 1895
- Full case name: In re Eugene V. Debs, Petitioner
- Citations: 158 U.S. 564 (more) 15 S. Ct. 900; 39 L. Ed. 1092; 1895 U.S. LEXIS 2279

Holding
- The court ruled that the government had a right to regulate interstate commerce and ensure the operations of the Post Office Department, along with a responsibility to "ensure the general welfare of the public."

Court membership
- Chief Justice Melville Fuller Associate Justices Stephen J. Field · John M. Harlan; Horace Gray · David J. Brewer; Henry B. Brown · George Shiras Jr. Howell E. Jackson · Edward D. White

Case opinion
- Majority: Brewer, joined by unanimous

Laws applied
- Commerce Clause; Postal Clause
- Superseded by
- Lauf v. E. G. Shinner & Co. (1938)
- Abrogated by
- Norris–La Guardia Act of 1932

In re Debs, 158 U.S. 564 (1895), was a labor law case of the United States Supreme Court, which upheld a contempt of court conviction against Eugene V. Debs. Debs had the American Railway Union continue its 1894 Pullman Strike in violation of a federal injunction ordering labor unions back to work. The Supreme Court held that the federal government's Postal and Commerce Clause authority includes the ability to regulate the labor conditions of railways.

== Background ==
Eugene V. Debs, president of the American Railway Union, had been involved in the Pullman Strike earlier in 1894 and challenged the federal injunction ordering the strikers back to work where they would face being fired. The injunction had been issued because of the violent nature of the strike. However, Debs refused to end the strike and was subsequently cited for contempt of court; he appealed the decision to the courts.

The main question being debated was whether the federal government had a right to issue the injunction, which dealt with both interstate and intrastate commerce and shipping on rail cars.

== Judgment ==
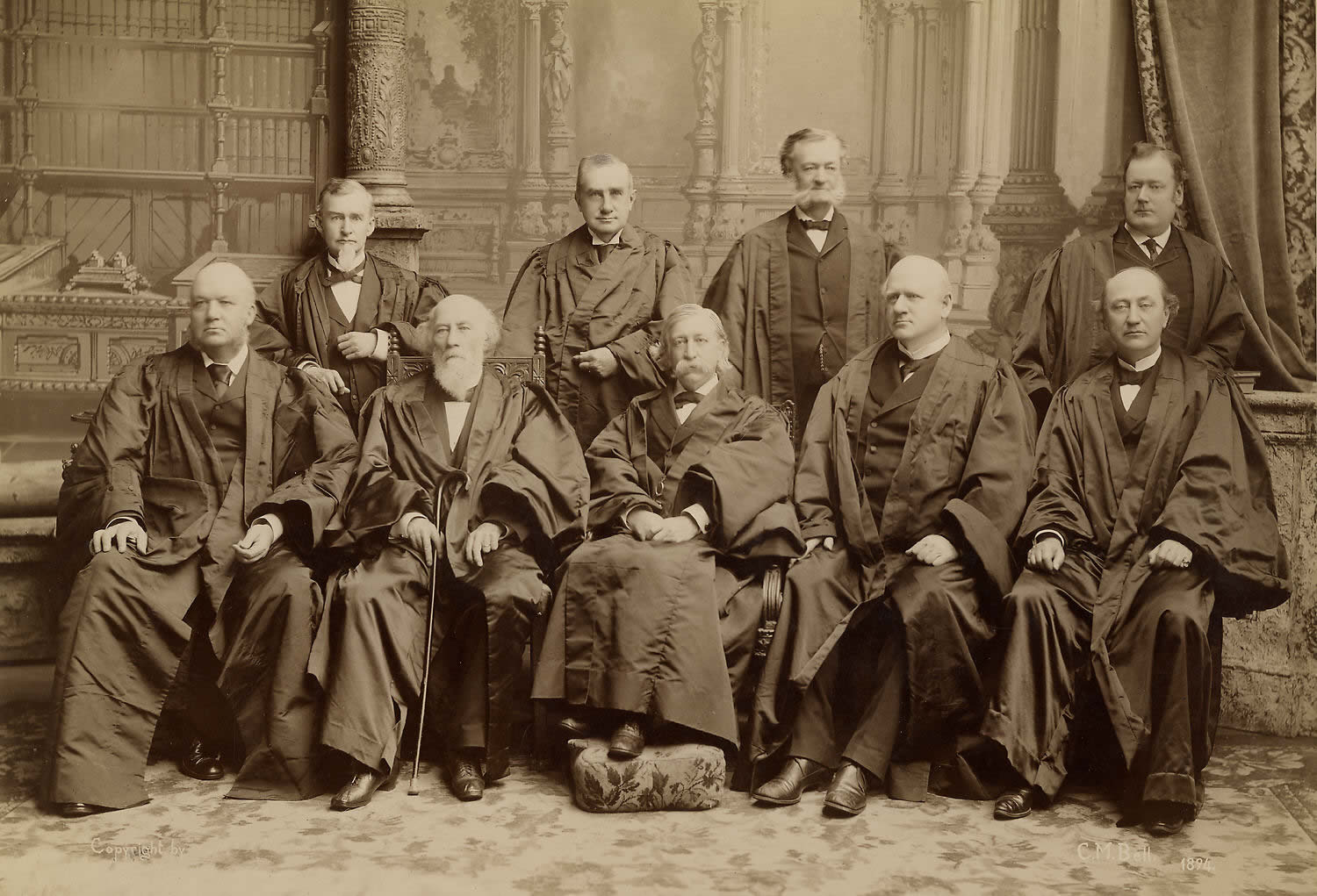
The Fuller Court

Justice David Josiah Brewer held, for a unanimous court, in favor of the U.S. government. Joined by Chief Justice Melville Fuller and Justices Stephen Johnson Field, John Marshall Harlan, Horace Gray, Henry Billings Brown, George Shiras Jr., Howell Edmunds Jackson, and Edward Douglass White, the court ruled that the government had a right to regulate interstate commerce and ensure the operations of the Post Office Department, along with a responsibility to "ensure the general welfare of the public." The decision slowed the momentum of labor unions. Debs would go on to lose another Supreme Court case in Debs v. United States.

== Significance ==
In Loewe v. Lawlor, the Supreme Court stated that unions were potentially liable for antitrust violations. In response, Congress passed the Clayton Antitrust Act of 1914 to take unions out of antitrust law. In addition, the ability to issue labor injunctions was greatly reduced with the passage of the Norris–La Guardia Act of 1932, which stripped the jurisdiction of federal courts over labor disputes, and was later upheld by the Supreme Court in Lauf v. E. G. Shinner & Co., 303 U.S. 323 (1938).

== See also ==
- List of United States Supreme Court cases, volume 158
