= Beard v. United States =

- Supreme Court of the United States

Submitted March 13, 1895 Decided May 27, 1895
- Full case name: Babe Beard v. United States
- Citations: 158 U.S. 550 (more) 15 S. Ct. 962; 39 L. Ed. 1086; 1895 U.S. LEXIS 2278

Court membership
- Chief Justice Melville Fuller Associate Justices Stephen J. Field · John M. Harlan; Horace Gray · David J. Brewer; Henry B. Brown · George Shiras Jr. Howell E. Jackson · Edward D. White

Case opinion
- Majority: Harlan, joined by unanimous

Beard v. United States, 158 U.S. 550 (1895), is a United States Supreme Court case in which self-defense in a homicide case was found not to require a duty to retreat.

== Background ==
Upon the death of their mother, three brothers named Will, John, and Edward Jones were all dispersed among living relatives so that they might be looked after. The young Edward Jones was sent to live with the Beard family, the wife of the house being the young Edward's aunt. Along with the young Edward Jones there was sent a cow. Beard (the case's namesake), accepted the young Edward Jones into his home on condition that he have full rights as if Edward were his own son and the cow belonged to him. These conditions are presumed to have been accepted.

Some years later Edward Jones left from the Beard farm and conspired with his older brothers to regain possession of the cow he viewed as being rightfully his. The brothers shortly thereafter set out to the Beard family farm, one of them having a shotgun, for purposes of regaining the cow. At this time Beard told them off and warned against their trying again, however stating that he would abide by lawful orders if the cow was legally found to belong to Edward. After this interaction the oldest of the brothers, Will Jones, publicly avowed that he would either get the cow from the Beard family or kill Beard, a threat that Beard shortly thereafter became aware of.

Later that same day the Jones brothers returned to the Beard family farm while Mr. Beard was absent and at such time attempted to take the cow from the Beard farm. This was noticed by Beard's wife, who began arguing with the Jones brothers until Beard returned home. Beard had a shotgun with him; however it was not disputed that he regularly carried his shotgun with him when leaving home and so his carrying of a weapon was not necessarily caused by the ongoing conflict with the Jones brothers. Upon his return Mr. Beard approached the Jones brothers and ordered them to leave his premises. In response to the order of Beard, Will Jones, the oldest of the brothers, approached Mr. Beard in a manner taken to be threateningly, an assessment the court appears to have agreed with.

In response to this approach, Beard warned Will Jones to stop, a warning that was not heeded as Will Jones continued to advance toward Mr. Beard. When Jones was within striking distance of Beard, he was struck upon the head with a shotgun by Beard. This strike was later deemed to have crushed the skull of Will Jones. This wound ultimately killed Jones. Beard, after having issued this strike, called for a doctor and set to dressing the wound. The doctor that had been called eventually became a government witness in the case against Beard. The doctor, Howard Hunt, described Beard as having been regretful of the incident but steadfast in his claim of having acted lawfully.

Beard was charged with manslaughter in the Western District Court of Arkansas and found guilty. He was sentenced to serve a term of eight years imprisonment in Kings County Penitentiary and pay a fine of five hundred dollars. His appeal of this verdict eventually led the case to the Supreme Court.

Of note is that the court in its opinion did acknowledge that some of the testimonies heard ran contrary to the version of events previously reported however held that there was sufficient evidence of the former telling of events such that it could not be said that operating under this understanding of events would not be ignoring the evidence.

== Court arguments ==
The prosecutor argued that Beard was obliged to avoid the danger presented by Will Jones, even though the confrontation took place on Beard's property. The prosecution's argument was that assuming the Jones brothers were exercising what they saw as a lawful claim in good faith, to kill them would be murder. The argument continued that, assuming they were committing an act of trespass and attempting larceny, then killing them would be manslaughter, and that because Mr. Beard could have retreated before the point at which violence erupted without any threat to his life, the claim of self defense would not be a valid defense.

== Judgement ==
This argument however, was not sufficient as to convince the court that Beard was morally or legally at fault. The court's opinion as to what measures must be taken before one is justified in killing in self defense was considerably more favorable to Beard. The court more or less stated that when the parties in conflict consist of one criminal party who initiates violence and one "true man" who has behaved lawfully and is only doing what is his right and he has warrant to do, such as protecting his property, the true man is not obliged to flee from the criminal party so that he can avoid any possible need for self defense.

The Supreme Court did not agree with the presupposition that Beard had a duty to retreat. Therefore, the judgement of Beard as guilty was reversed. In so doing, the court established the True Man Doctrine that would go on to be the bedrock of stand-your-ground laws in the United States. Several states have gone on to institute, and still have in effect, Duty to Retreat Laws. However, the precedent set by Beard v. United States has not yet been overturned and so is still considered the authoritative precedent on the matter.
