= Lem Moon Sing v. United States =

- Supreme Court of the United States

Argued April 18, 1895 Decided May 27, 1895
- Full case name: Lem Moon Sing v. United States
- Citations: 158 U.S. 538 (more)

Holding
- The provisions of Sundry Civil Service Appropriations Act, 1895, providing for the finality of admissibility decisions are valid.

Court membership
- Chief Justice Melville Fuller Associate Justices Stephen J. Field · John M. Harlan; Horace Gray · David J. Brewer; Henry B. Brown · George Shiras Jr. Howell E. Jackson · Edward D. White

Case opinions
- Majority: Harlan, joined by Brown, Field, Fuller, Gray, Shiras, White
- Dissent: Brewer

Lem Moon Sing v. United States, 158 U.S. 538 (1895), was a United States Supreme Court decision about the finality of administrative decisions concerning admission of foreigners to the United States, which built upon Nishimura Ekiu v. United States (1892), and strengthened the doctrine of administrative finality in United States immigration and nationality law announced in Nishimura Ekiu.

== Background ==
Lem Moon Sing was a Chinese immigrant who worked in the United States as a merchant. He conducted his work and had permanent domicile in San Francisco. On January 30th, 1894, Sing began a year-long visit to China. During his absence, and under appropriations related to immigration enforcement, Congress passed a rider to the Sundry Civil Service Appropriations Act, 1895, which further strengthened the administrative finality first established under section 8 of the Immigration Act of 1891. This strengthened administrative finality provision read as follows:

In every case where an alien is excluded from admission into the United States under any law or treaty now existing or hereafter made, the decision of the appropriate immigration or custom officers, if adverse to the admission of such alien, shall be final unless reversed on appeal to the Secretary of the Treasury.

Upon Sing's return to the United States on November 3rd, 1894, he applied to be readmitted and had complications doing so. He explained that he was a merchant in the United States and he had two non-Chinese individuals testify on his behalf. His name did not show up with the firm that he was a part of, resulting in his application to re-enter being denied and then him being detained.

== Opinion of the court ==
Lim Lung testified as a petitioner to the court on behalf of Sing. He argued that Sing's detention and consequential deportation would be detrimental to his company. He also argued that Sing was not inadmissible and that the customs officer, John Wise, did not have authority to detain Sing pending deportation. It was also argued that the detention and deportation of Sing would violate prior treaties between the United States and China.

In an 8-1 opinion delivered May 27, 1895, Justice John Marshall Harlan, relying primarily upon Chae Chan Ping v. United States (1889) and Nishimura Ekiu v. United States (1892), held that the provisions of the Sundry Civil Service Appropriations Act, 1895, were constitutional and that the immigration and customs officials had the "exclusive authority to determine whether a particular alien seeking admission into the country... a class forbidden to enter the United States." This decision furthered the doctrine of administrative finality set forth in Nishimura Ekiu v. United States (1892).
