= Mary E. Switzer =

Mary Elizabeth Switzer
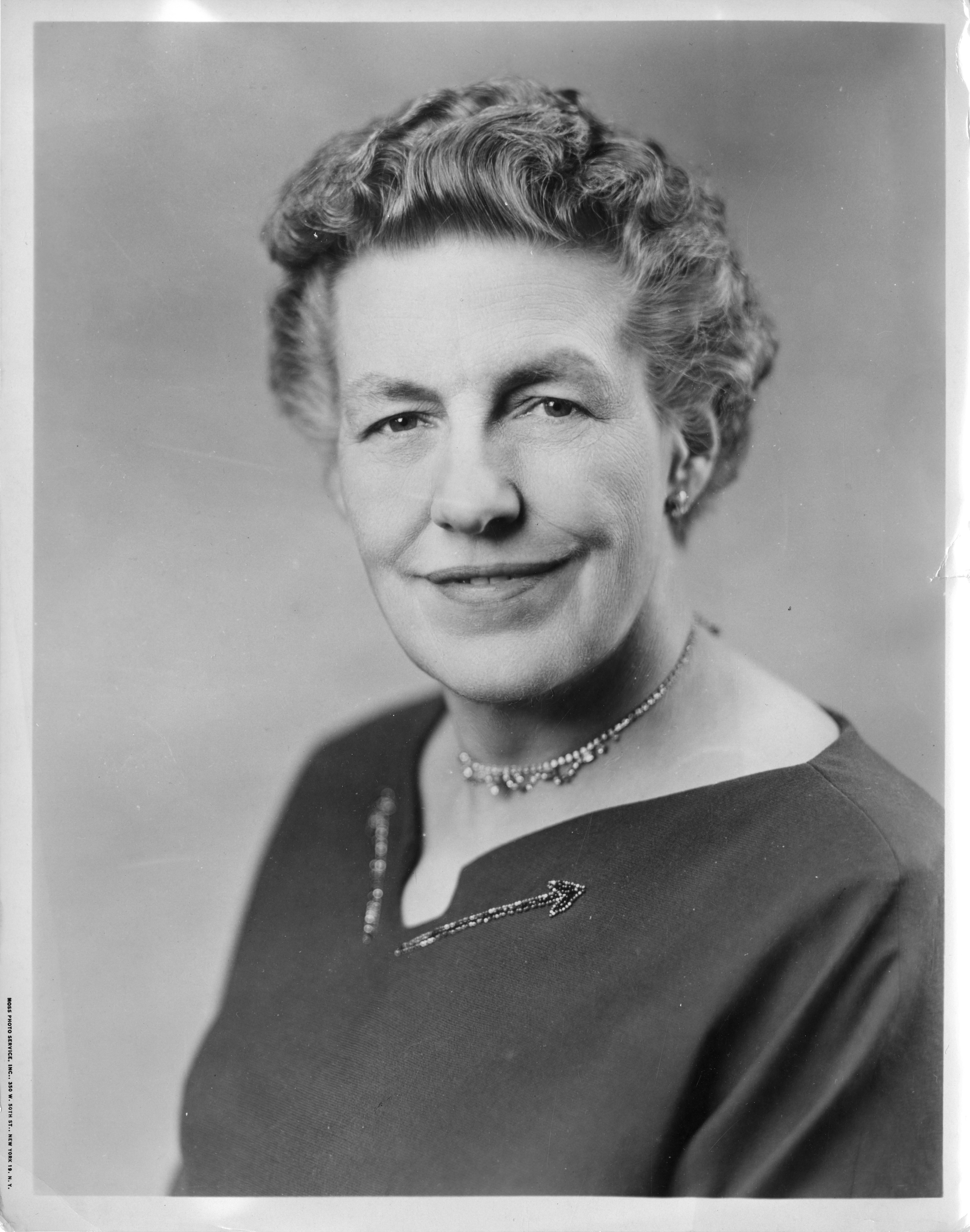
- Switzer, n.d.
- Born: February 16, 1900; Newton Upper Falls, Massachusetts, U.S.
- Died: October 16, 1971 (aged 71)
- Occupation: Public administrator
- Known for: Director of Office of Vocational Rehabilitation, Administrator of Social and Rehabilitation Service

Mary Elizabeth Switzer (February 16, 1900 - October 16, 1971) was an American public administrator and social reformer. She is best remembered for her work on the 1954 Vocational Rehabilitation Act, which provided a great expansion of vocational rehabilitation service for people with disabilities. She publicized the government's growing role in vocational rehabilitation and encouraged expansion of vocational rehabilitation projects among non-governmental organizations.

== Education and career ==
Switzer graduated from Radcliffe College in 1921 with a B.A. in international law and started working for the federal government: first as an assistant secretary to the Minimum Wage Board and then for U.S. Department of the Treasury under the Public Health Service and the Federal Security Agency, becoming increasingly concerned with health care issues. Switzer became director of the Office of Vocational Rehabilitation in the U.S. Department of Health, Education, and Welfare in 1950 and the first administrator of the Social and Rehabilitation Service in 1967. She retired in 1970 as the highest ranking female bureaucrat in the federal government and became vice-president of the World Rehabilitation Fund until her death a year later.

Switzer was the first woman to serve on the Board of Directors at Georgetown University in 1969. She served as president of the National Rehabilitation Association from 1960 to 1961 and as advisor to many American health organizations, including the Menninger Foundation and St. Elizabeths Hospital. In recognition of her contributions to vocational rehabilitation, Switzer received the President's Certificate of Merit in 1948, the Albert Lasker Award in 1960 with Paul Wilson Brand and Gudmund Harlem, the American Association of Workers for the Blind's Ambrose M. Shotwell Memorial Award in 1962, and the Edward Miner Gallaudet Award in 1970.

Switzer received honorary degrees from Hofstra University in 1969, Gallaudet College, Russell Sage College, and five other universities.

Switzer died in 1971 and was buried in Ivy Hill Cemetery in Alexandria, Virginia.

== Commemoration ==
- Mary Switzer Building, Washington D.C. houses some components of the Department of Health and Human Services
- Mary E. Switzer Building, Woodrow Wilson Rehabilitation Center campus, Fishersville, VA, features a display of Switzer's memorabilia
- Mary Switzer Research Fellowships are administered by the U.S. Department of Education Office of Special Education and Rehabilitative Services
