= California v. Prysock =

- Supreme Court of the United States

Decided June 29, 1981
- Full case name: State of California v. Randall James Prysock
- Citations: 453 U.S. 355 (more)

Case history
- Prior: Certiorari to the California Court of Appeal, Fifth District

Holding
- There is no rule requiring that Miranda warnings need to be precise to withstand scrutiny as long as the warnings are effectual.

Court membership
- Chief Justice Warren E. Burger Associate Justices William J. Brennan Jr. · Potter Stewart; Byron White · Thurgood Marshall; Harry Blackmun · Lewis F. Powell Jr. William Rehnquist · John P. Stevens

Case opinions
- Majority: Burger, joined by Stewart, Powell, Rehnquist, Blackmun, Rehnquist
- Dissent: Stevens, joined by Brennan, Marshall

Laws applied
- Fifth Amendment of the United States Constitution

California v. Prysock, 453 U.S. 355 (1981) was a per curiam United States Supreme Court case where the Court ruled that as long as the message of a Miranda warning was adequately communicated, it does not need to be precisely phrased.

== Background ==
On January 30, 1978, Donna Iris Erickson was found brutally murdered in Tulare County, California. Later, Randall James Prysock and a codefendant were arrested for committing the murder. As Prysock was 16 years old at the time, Tulare County Sheriff's Sergeant Byrd informed him of his Miranda rights, and notified his parents after he initially refused to answer questions. After his parents arrived, Prysock changed his mind and decided to answer Sergeant Byrd's questions on tape. Byrd then reiterated Prysock's rights under Miranda and as a juvenile. He stated that Prysock had the right to have counsel and his parents present before and during questioning, but was not explicitly told that he could request an attorney before further questioning. Byrd then had a conversation with Prysock's mother where she chose not to hire a lawyer.

During Prysock's trial, his motion to suppress the statements was rejected, and he was convicted of first-degree murder. The California Court of Appeal, Fifth District reversed and remanded his conviction on the basis that "the rigidity of the Miranda rules and the way in which they are to be applied was conceived of and continues to be recognized as the decision's greatest strength."

== Decision ==
In a 6-3 per curiam decision, the Court ruled that Prysock's rights were adequately conveyed and that Miranda v. Arizona did not require a "talismanic incantation."

In a dissent authored by Justice John P. Stevens, he argued that Sergeant Byrd left out crucial information that Prysock had the right to the services of an attorney regardless of his parents' willingness to hire one. Instead, the phrasing of "[the] right to have a lawyer appointed to represent you at no cost to yourself" could be construed as having the right to an attorney at trial. The statement about parents being present inserted between the rights to an attorney during questioning, and the untaped conversation with Prysock's mother further muddled the waters. The ambiguous meaning thus undercuts Miranda's message of "meaningful advice to the unlettered and unlearned in language which he can comprehend and on which he can knowingly act."
