= Mary E. Switzer Memorial Building =

Government building in Washington, D.C.

- U.S. National Register of Historic Places
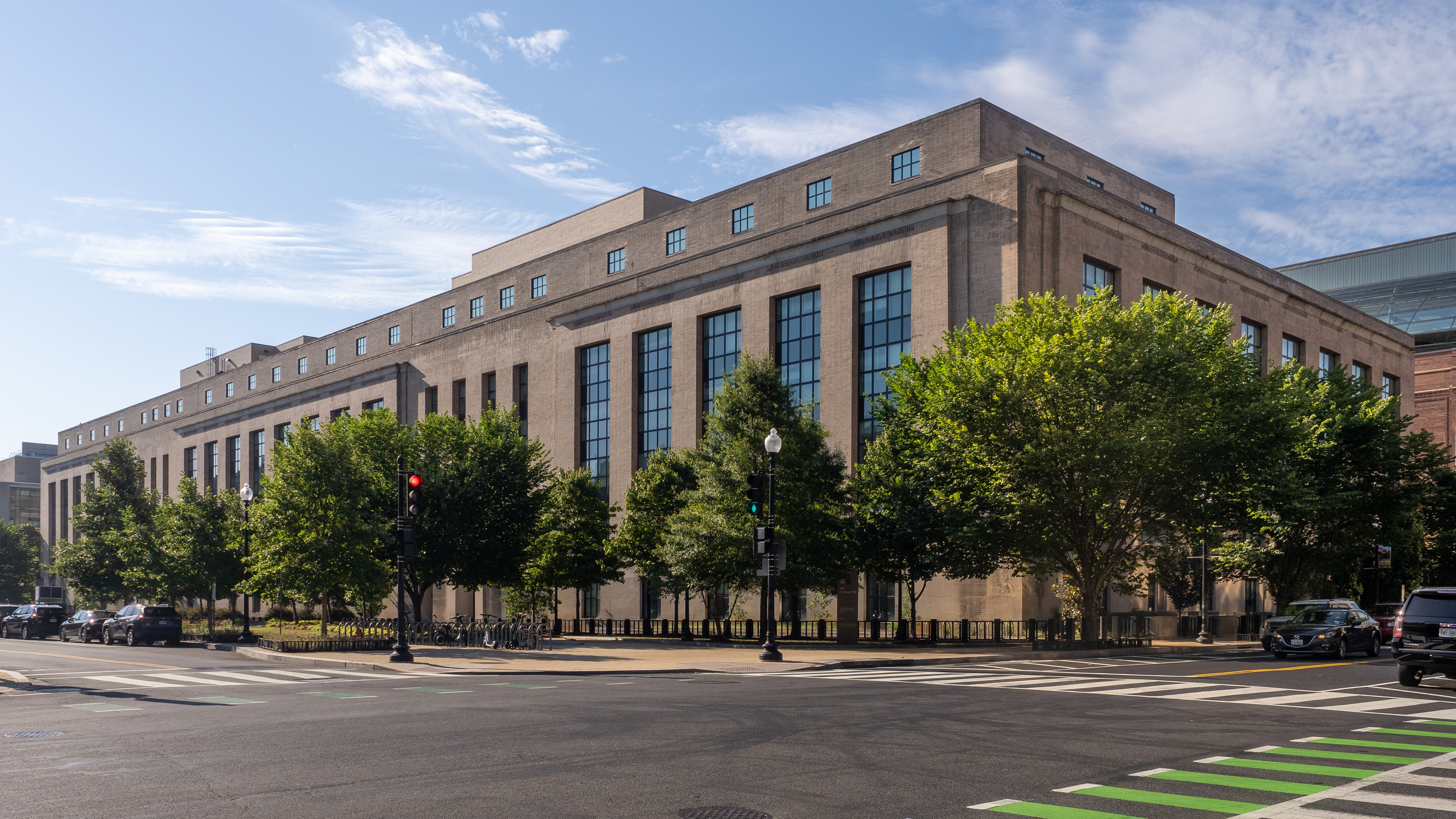
- Mary E. Switzer Memorial Building in 2024

- Location within Central Washington, D.C. Location within the District of Columbia Location within the United States
- Location: 330 C Street, SW
- Coordinates: 38°53′8″N 77°1′0″W
- Area: 3 acres (1.2 ha)
- Built: 1940
- Architect: Charles Zeller Klauder; Office of the Supervising Architect
- Architectural style: Egyptian Revival
- NRHP reference No.: 07000638
- Added to NRHP: July 6, 2007

The Mary E. Switzer Memorial Building (formerly known as the Railroad Retirement Board Building) is a federally owned office building located at 330 C Street SW in Washington, D.C., United States. It was designed in the Egyptian Revival style by Charles Klauder and Louis A. Simon and completed on September 15, 1940. Although intended for the Railroad Retirement Board, its first occupant was the United States Department of War. By Act of Congress, it was renamed for Mary E. Switzer on October 21, 1972, becoming the first federal building to be named for a woman.

The Switzer Building was added to the National Register of Historic Places on July 6, 2007.

== Genesis ==
The Railroad Retirement Board Building was first proposed in 1938 as part of a massive federal construction effort in the District of Columbia and around the country. President Franklin D. Roosevelt proposed the construction projects both as a way of providing employment to the millions of Americans out of work due to the Great Depression but also as a means of meeting the office space needs of the rapidly expanding federal government. Those needs, especially in Washington, D.C., had gone unmet for nearly a decade. On February 9, 1937, Roosevelt named an informal committee to study federal office space needs. The committee was chaired by United States Secretary of the Interior Harold L. Ickes, and included Senator Elmer Thomas (D-Oklahoma); Representative Ross A. Collins (D-Mississippi); Rear Admiral Christian J. Peoples, United States Navy; and Frederic A. Delano, chair of the National Capital Parks and Planning Commission.

The President's Special Committee on Public Buildings recommended in April 1938 construction of a new headquarters for the Railroad Retirement Board, a federal agency created in 1935 to oversee a pension system for the nation's railroad workers. President Roosevelt proposed a construction bill on May 17, 1938, in which $3 million was set aside to purchase land, design, and begin construction on a new Social Security Administration Building and a new Railroad Retirement Board Building. The 75th Congress, due to adjourn on June 16, raced to get the bill approved. By June 11, the Senate had acted on the bill. Initially, the House of Representatives stripped the $3 million appropriation from the bill. The appropriation was restored on June 16 when House members agreed to pay the funds out of the $965 million Public Works Administration (PWA) funding bill. The total cost of the two structures was now estimated at $14.25 million. The PWA bill passed Congress on June 25, 1938, (Public Law 75-723), and President Roosevelt signed it into law.

=== Design ===
Progress on construction was quite rapid. Design of the building was overseen by Louis A. Simon, the Supervising Architect in the Office of the Supervising Architect in the United States Department of the Treasury, which had oversight of all federal construction. The primary architect was Charles Zeller Klauder, a designer who worked in a variety of styles.

On July 28, 1938, Simon and Klauder presented their design for the two structures to the United States Commission of Fine Arts, which had the authority to review all new public buildings erected in the District of Columbia. Klauder designed back-to-back buildings, with the Social Security structure facing Independence Avenue SW and the Railroad Retirement building facing C Street SW. Because of the need to provide a great deal of interior light via windows, Klauder proposed a "fishbone" structure: A long central corridor from which five short, narrow wings projected on both the north and south sides. The overall length of the building was 500 feet (150 m), and it had elements of both Streamline Moderne and Egyptian Revival in its facade. Klauder also proposed an alternative treatment of the building. He suggested making the three central wings look like pylons from the street, each with a low base. All the wings would have 25-foot (7.6 m) high windows, set 15 feet (4.6 m) apart with 1.5-foot (0.46 m) deep reveals. Pilasters 46 feet (14 m) high topped by non-load bearing lintels would help screen the bays created by the wings. The entire two-building structure would have a uniform cornice line, be five stories tall, have a limestone facade, and have 900,000 square feet (84,000 m^{2}) of internal space (of which the railroad building had 590,000 square feet (55,000 m^{2})). A two-story penthouse contained mechanical and HVAC systems. The commission was greatly pleased by Klauder's alternative treatment, and approved it on July 28, 1939.

Detailed architectural and engineering designs were immediately begun.

By November 1938, the cost of the two buildings had fallen to $10.815 million.

== Construction ==
Construction of the two buildings proved very important to the District of Columbia. Prior to 1939, most federal office buildings were clustered in Federal Triangle or areas close to the White House. The District's building boom was driven in great part by the needs of the United States Department of War, which was adding tens of thousands of workers. Roosevelt had adopted a policy of mobilization, to prepare the nation for possible entry into World War II. But most military officers and upper-level civilian workers lived in Northwest Washington and the Virginia counties across the Potomac River from it. To ensure that these tens of thousands of War Department workers could get to their jobs quickly and easily, War Department office buildings were planned for the northwest section of the city. This left no room for the Social Security and Railroad Retirement Board buildings in that part of town. Because workers for the Social Security Administration and the Railroad Retirement Board were low-wage workers without an urgent need to get to their jobs in a timely fashion, the Social Security and Railroad Retirement Board buildings were deliberately sited in Southwest Washington. This started a trend of federal construction of office buildings in Southwest Washington, leading to the creation of Southwest Federal Center.

The Railroad Retirement Board Building and the Social Security Administration Building were the first federal office buildings constructed in Southwest D.C.

=== Construction speed-up and defense assignment ===
Construction on the two structures began in May 1939. Both the American Federation of Labor (AFL) and the Congress of Industrial Organizations (CIO) agreed not to strike contractors working on the two buildings. By July 1939, the cost of the two buildings was estimated to be $12 million. The foundations were complete by the end of the year, and President Roosevelt proposed in January 1940 to spend $3.25 million to continue work on the structures in coming year to reach a planned January 1, 1941, opening date.

However, by June 1940, the space shortage affecting the War Department was so acute that PWA officials began speeding up construction on the Railroad Retirement Board Building. Already, rumors were swirling around Washington that the War Department, not the retirement board, would occupy the structure. These rumors proved true on June 20, 1940, when the PWA announced that the War Department was now slated to occupy both structures. Congress initially appropriated an extra $100,000 to pay for overtime and accelerated purchase of construction costs. An additional $400,000 was appropriated to further speed construction. The talks with contractors over speeding up construction proved effective, and the new deadline for completion of both buildings was fall of 1940. Agencies scheduled to take up residency in the two buildings included the National Defense Advisory Commission (an informal body established in June 1940 to promote the conversion of industry to a wartime footing), the Army Quartermaster Corps, the Army Corps of Engineers, and other War Department units. Despite these moves, the original names of the buildings remained attached to each.

To handle the massive influx of military workers, city officials began working with the Capital Traction Company and the private companies providing public bus service to plan new streetcar and bus lines to serve the structures.

Only a single major accident was reported during the building's construction. On July 4, 1940, 43-year-old construction worker Roy Trowbridge suffered a fractured spine when scaffolding he was standing on gave way and he fell four stories to the ground.

By early July, the $14 million buildings were due to be completed by September 1, 1940.

=== Strikes ===
Despite the earlier pledge by AFL and CIO officials to not strike war-related construction, strikes plagued the work on the two buildings in the summer of 1940. The first strike occurred when 250 workers at the Smoot Sand & Gravel walked out to protest a job classification by the federal Wage and Hour Division. The men worked on barges dredging gravel, and wanted to be classified as seamen so they could qualify for overtime and work more than the federally approved 42-hour work week. The strike began on July 9, lasted five days, and idled more than 6,500 workers (including those working on the Social Security and Railroad Retirement Board buildings) as no concrete could be delivered. The men won reclassification as seamen, a 10 percent wage increase, and pay for five days they were idle.

A second strike hit the construction site on July 18. This jurisdictional strike involved 250 carpenters, who were involved in a dispute with the plasterers over who had the right to build sawhorses. More than 2,000 of the 3,000 workers on the two-building job site were idled as the strike continued. The strike ended on July 19 after both labor unions agreed to allow the Building and Construction Trades Department (BCTD) of the AFL to arbitrate the dispute.

A third strike hit the site on August 2. This jurisdictional strike involved 180 plasterers and cement finishers, who walked off the job in a dispute over who would install more than 750,000 square feet (70,000 m^{2}) of acoustic ceiling tile. The strike didn't idle many workers, just 60 lathers and plasterers' assistants. The Federal Mediation and Conciliation Service was called in to mediate the dispute. The strike received front-page coverage in The Washington Post. AFL officials denounced the strike, calling it an illegal wildcat strike. Deputy Secretary of Labor Daniel W. Tracy (president of the International Brotherhood of Electrical Workers from 1933 to 1940), and BCTD President John P. Coyne personally intervened in the negotiations to bring them to a swift conclusion. The strike ended on August 8 after a special representative from National Defense Advisory Commissioner Sidney Hillman also intervened. In the past, the carpenters performed 50 percent of all acoustic tile work, with the bricklayers and plasterers installing 25 percent of the tile. Under the new agreement, the three unions shared equally in the work. Because the acoustic tile wasn't due to be installed yet, the strike created no real delay in the work.

A fourth jurisdictional dispute also threatened to disrupt work at the site. Bricklayers and glaziers both wanted to install structural glass in each building's lavatories. But, to the relief of federal officials, no strike ever occurred.

=== Completion ===
The Railroad Retirement Board Building was completed on September 15, 1940. Three floors of the Social Security Administration Building were finished on October 1, and the rest of the structure on November 1. The total cost of construction for both was $14.25 million. Due to the large number of employees to be housed in the two structures, more than 1,800 telephone lines had to be installed. To accommodate the lines, the Department of War had to have its own telephone exchange (REpublic 6700) assigned to it for the first time. The two buildings were joined by a tunnel, and each had special loading docks to speed deliveries to them. To air condition the buildings, seven 600-short-ton (540 t) cooling units were purchased from the Carrier Corporation and installed on-site. The two buildings were among the first in buildings in the District of Columbia to feature air conditioning, acoustic ceiling tile, and fluorescent lighting.

The Quartermaster Corps occupied the Railroad Retirement Board Building on October 2, 1940, and the Corps of Engineers moved into its quarters in December 1940.

While it matched the neighboring Social Security Building in terms of architectural style and monumental scale, the building incorporated fewer artistic embellishments in its facade. The exterior features only two bas-reliefs placed over both main entrances on either end of the building's northern facade, both designed by Robert Kittredge and installed in 1941.

After the end of World War II, the Railroad Retirement Board Building was turned over to the United States Department of Health, Education, and Welfare. The building was colloquially known as "HEW-South".

== Renaming ==
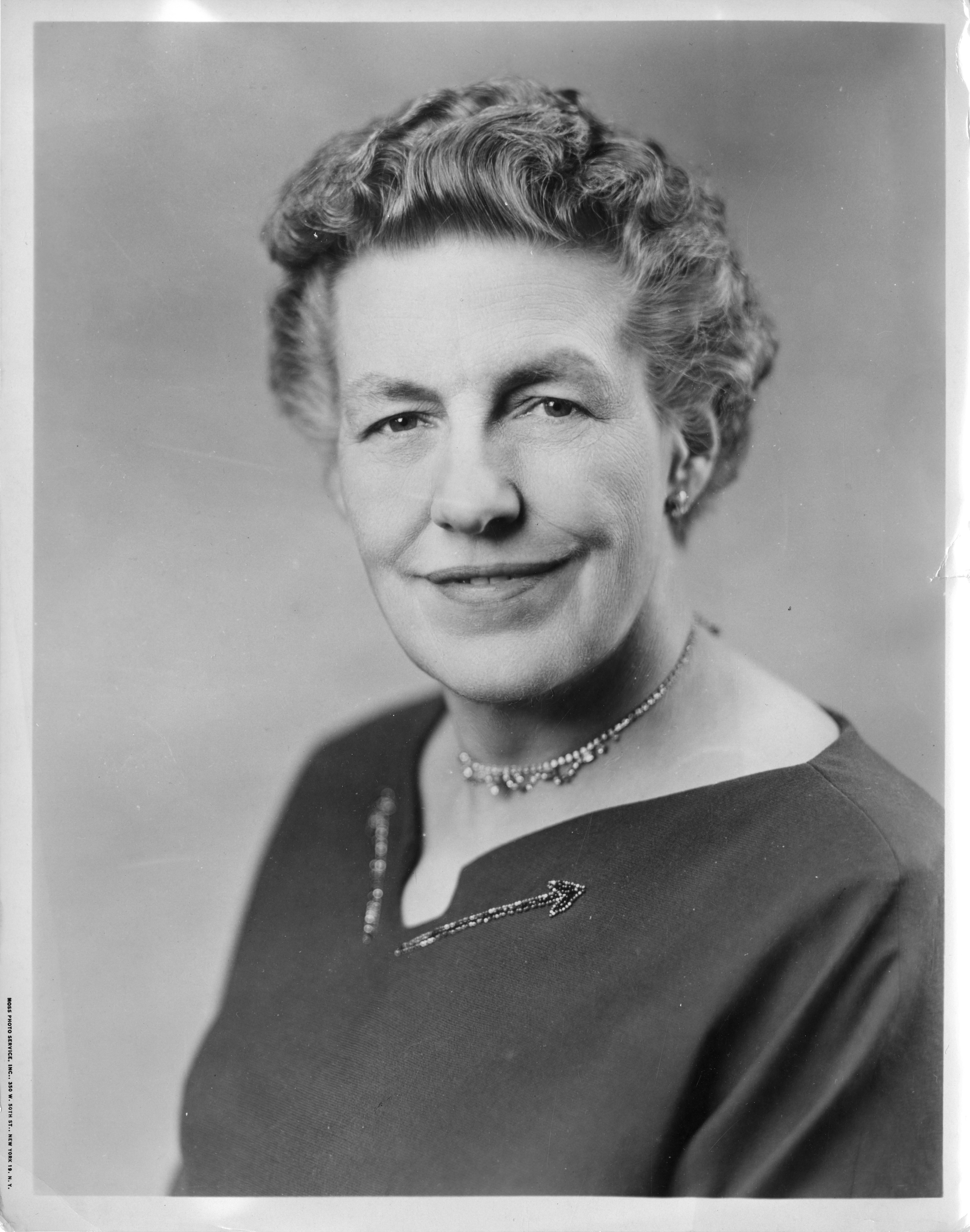
Mary E. Switzer

On October 16, 1971, Mary E. Switzer died. Switzer became director of the Office of Vocational Rehabilitation in the Department of Health, Education, and Welfare in 1950 and the first administrator of HEW's Social and Rehabilitation Service in 1967. She retired in 1970 as the highest ranking female bureaucrat in the federal government.

In December 1971, Senator Hubert H. Humphrey (D-Minnesota) introduced legislation in the Senate to have the Railroad Retirement Board Building renamed in honor of Switzer. On October 21, 1972, President Richard Nixon signed Public Law 92-520 into law. Section 26 of the law redesignated the Railroad Retirement Board Building as the "Mary Switzer Memorial Building". The structure was formally rededicated on January 16, 1973. It was the first federal building to be named for a woman.

On July 6, 2007, the Switzer Building was added to the National Register of Historic Places.

== Renovations ==
By 2002, three agencies occupied space in the Switzer Building. The United States Department of Education took up 60 percent of its space, while the United States Department of Health and Human Services had 30 percent and the Broadcasting Board of Governors (the body which governs the Voice of America and other U.S. government broadcasting bodies) had the remainder.

In 2002, the General Services Administration announced an $81.7 million renovation of the Switzer Building. HNTB, an architectural and engineering firm, was selected to oversee the upgrades. Construction was scheduled to begin in early 2005, and proceed in two phases. Phase I would renovate half the building and end in early 2007. Phase II would renovate the other half, and be complete in summer 2008. Renovations included an entirely new HVAC system, fire suppression system, and emergency electrical power plant; replacement of all electrical wiring and plumbing; a new telecommunications system; security upgrades; and refurbishment of the main lobby. Because modern mechanical and HVAC equipment was much smaller than the units it replaced, the two-story mechanical penthouse was reclaimed and converted into office space. Phase II of the project began in July 2009. Another 18,000 square feet (1,700 m^{2}) of mechanical space was reclaimed in the sixth and seventh floors (the former two-story mechanical penthouse), the elevator shafts extended to the two topmost stories, and new elevators installed. Windows throughout the building were replaced with modern energy-efficient ones, and a green roof placed atop the structure.

While construction continued, the Switzer Building served as the headquarters for the second inauguration of George W. Bush.

In April 2014, the General Services Administration said it would spend $10.38 million to renovate the Switzer Building into open workspace. This would allow 1,627 employees in five HHS divisions to move into the structure. The agencies scheduled to move into the Switzer building after the renovation are the Administration for Children and Families, the Administration for Community Living, the Departmental Appeals Board, the Office of the Assistant Secretary for Health and the Office of the National Coordinator for Health Information Technology.

== See also ==
- Social Security Administration Building, the building built back-to-back with the Railroad Retirement Board Building
- National Register of Historic Places listings in central Washington, D.C.

== Bibliography ==
- Carew, Michael G. (2010). Becoming the Arsenal: The American Industrial Mobilization for World War II, 1938-1942. Lanham, Md.: University Press of America. ISBN 9780761846680.
- Commission of Fine Arts (1936). Commission of Fine Arts, Thirteenth Report, January 1, 1935 to December 31, 1939. Washington, D.C.: U.S. Commission of Fine Arts. hdl:2027/mdp.39015068260341.
