= Supremacy Clause =

Clause of the U.S. Constitution

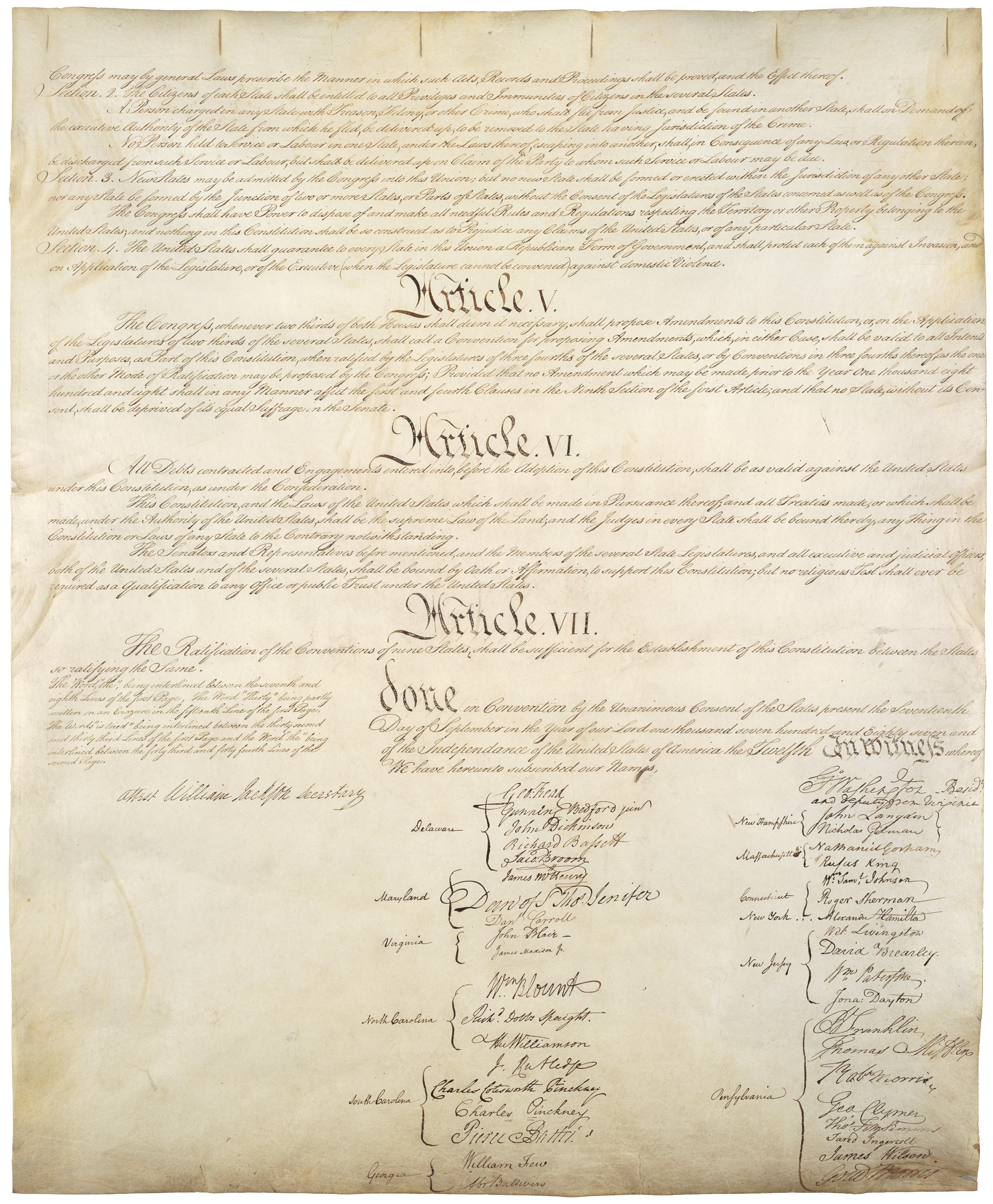
Fourth page of Constitution of the United States

The Supremacy Clause of the Constitution of the United States (Article VI, Clause 2) establishes that the U.S. constitution, federal laws, and treaties override all state laws that conflict with them. It promulgates that all state laws, state courts, and state constitutions are subordinate to the U.S. Constitution and federal laws and treaties made by the U.S. government.

However, federal statutes must be pursuant to the U.S. Constitution for the Supremacy Clause. It is the prerogative of the federal judiciary of the United States to preempt state statutes through judicial review.

The Supremacy Clause is essentially a conflict-of-laws rule mandating the priority of federal regulation over state regulation to prevent states from impeding the enforcement of federal law.

The Supremacy Clause follows Article XIII of the Articles of Confederation, the predecessor of the Constitution, which provided that "Every State shall abide by the determination of the [Congress], on all questions which by this confederation are submitted to them." As a constitutional provision identifying the supremacy of federal law, the Supremacy Clause assumes the underlying priority of federal authority, albeit only when that authority is expressed in the Constitution itself; no matter what the federal or state governments might wish to do, they must stay within the boundaries of the Constitution. Consequently, the Supremacy Clause is considered a cornerstone of the United States' federal political structure.

== Text ==
This Constitution, and the Laws of the United States which shall be made in Pursuance thereof; and all Treaties made, or which shall be made, under the Authority of the United States, shall be the supreme Law of the Land; and the Judges in every State shall be bound thereby, any thing in the Constitution or Laws of any State to the Contrary notwithstanding.

== Background ==
=== Constitutional Convention ===
According to Madison's Notes of Debates in the Federal Convention of 1787, the Supremacy Clause was introduced as part of the New Jersey Plan. During the debate, it was first put up for a motion by Luther Martin on July 17, when it passed unanimously. The original wording of "the supreme Law of the several states" was replaced by Gouverneur Morris as part of the Committee on Style's final revisions to clarify that federal authority ran over the states, rather than through them.

During Pennsylvania's ratifying convention in late 1787, James Wilson stated, "the power of the Constitution predominates. Anything, therefore, that shall be enacted by Congress contrary thereto, will not have the force of law."

=== The Federalist Papers ===
In Federalist No. 33, Alexander Hamilton writes about the Supremacy Clause that federal laws by definition must be supreme. If the laws do not function from that position, then they amount to nothing, noting that "A law, by the very meaning of the term, includes supremacy. It is a rule which those to whom it is prescribed are bound to observe. This results from every political association. If individuals enter into a state of society, the laws of that society must be the supreme regulator of their conduct. If a number of political societies enter into a larger political society, the laws which the latter may enact, pursuant to the powers entrusted to it by its constitution, must necessarily be supreme over those societies, and the individuals of whom they are composed."

In Federalist No. 44, James Madison defends the Supremacy Clause as vital to the functioning of the nation. He noted that state legislatures were invested with all powers not specifically defined in the Constitution, but also said that having the federal government subservient to various state constitutions would be an inversion of the principles of government, concluding that if supremacy were not established "it would have seen the authority of the whole society everywhere subordinate to the authority of the parts; it would have seen a monster, in which the head was under the direction of the members".

Alexander Hamilton, wrote in Federalist No. 78 that, "There is no position which depends on clearer principles, than that every act of a delegated authority, contrary to the tenor of the commission under which it is exercised, is void. No legislative act, therefore, contrary to the Constitution, can be valid."

== Preemption doctrine ==
The constitutional principle derived from the Supremacy Clause is federal preemption. Preemption applies regardless of whether the conflicting laws come from legislatures, courts, administrative agencies, or constitutions. For example, the Voting Rights Act of 1965, an act of Congress, preempts state constitutions, and Food and Drug Administration regulations may preempt state court judgments in cases involving prescription drugs.

Congress has preempted state regulation in many areas. In some cases, such as the 1976 Medical Device Regulation Act, Congress preempted all state regulation. In others, such as labels on prescription drugs, Congress allowed federal regulatory agencies to set federal minimum standards but did not preempt state regulations imposing more stringent standards than those imposed by federal regulators. Where rules or regulations do not clearly state whether or not preemption should apply, the Supreme Court tries to follow lawmakers’ intent and prefers interpretations that avoid preempting state laws.

=== Subsequent federal case law ===
Chy Lung v. Freeman was brought to court when a passenger arriving in California on the Chinese vessel Japan was detained by the Commissioner of Immigration on the charge of being included by a state statute in the caste of "lewd and debauched women," which require separate bonds from the owner of the vessel they came on in order to land on California's coast. The Supreme Court ruled against the plaintiff's detention on the basis that the statute preempted the federal legislation's ability to regulate the "admission of citizens and subjects of foreign nations to our shores".

LULAC v. Wilson was brought to the Supreme Court in order to determine the constitutionality of California's Proposition 187, which the League of United Latin American Citizens argued was preempted by the federal government's authority over the regulation of foreign nationals in America. Proposition 187 was meant to assist cooperative efforts undertaken by national and sub-national governments to place stricter restrictions on undocumented immigrants "from receiving benefits or public services in the State of California". The Court decided that only a small portion of Proposition 187 was not preempted by the Personal Responsibility and Work Opportunity Reconciliation Act of 1996.

Villas at Parkside Partners v. City of Farmers Branch dealt with an ordinance passed by the City of Farmers Branch. Ordinance 2952 forced individuals seeking to reside in a "rented apartment or 'single-family residence’" to obtain a license first. The Court ruled that Ordinance 2952 did in fact conflict with preexisting federal law and thus affirmed the lower court's decision.

== Treaties ==
The supremacy of treaties over state law has been described as an "unquestioned axiom of the founding" of the United States. Under the Supremacy Clause, treaties and federal statutes are regarded equally as "supreme law of the land" with "no superior efficacy ... given to either over the other". Thus, international agreements made pursuant to the Treaty Clause—namely, ratified with the advice and consent of a two-thirds supermajority of the Senate—are treaties in the constitutional sense and thereby incorporated into U.S. federal law no differently than an act of Congress. Treaties are likewise subject to judicial interpretation and review just as any federal statute, and courts have consistently recognized them as legally binding under the Constitution.

The U.S. Supreme Court applied the Supremacy Clause for the first time in the 1796 case, Ware v. Hylton, ruling that a treaty superseded conflicting state law. The Court held that both states and private citizens were bound to comply with the treaty obligations of the federal government, which was in turn bound by the "law of nations" to honor treaties. Shortly thereafter, in the 1801 case, United States v. Schooner Peggy, the court ruled in favor of a private citizen's lawsuit against the government on the basis of a treaty, and for the first time elaborated upon supreme nature of ratified treaties:

[W]here a treaty is the law of the land, and as such affects the rights of parties litigating in court, that treaty as much binds those rights and is as much to be regarded by the court as an act of congress; and although restoration may be an executive, when viewed as a substantive act, independent of and unconnected with other circumstances, yet to condemn a vessel, the restoration of which is directed by a law of the land, would be a direct infraction of that law, and of consequence improper.

In Foster v. Nielson (1829), Chief Justice John Marshall, writing for the majority, affirmed that a treaty is constitutionally the "law of the land", but for the first time articulated a distinction between self-executing and non-self-executing agreements with respect to domestic law:

Our constitution declares a treaty to be the law of the land. It is, consequently, to be regarded in courts of justice as equivalent to an act of the legislature, whenever it operates of itself, without the aid of any legislative provision. But when the terms of the stipulation import a contract—when either of the parties engages to perform a particular act, the treaty addresses itself to the political, not the judicial department; and the legislature must execute the contract, before it can become a rule for the court.

While it is generally agreed by constitutional scholars that treaties are as binding as domestic federal law, courts have differed on the enforceability of some types of international agreements and on the precise scope of a treaty's legal obligations. Beginning with the 1884 Head Money Cases, the Supreme Court has consistently held that Congress can abrogate a treaty by legislative action even if this amounts to a violation of the treaty under international law; indeed, courts will enforce congressional modifications of a treaty regardless of whether foreign actors still consider the treaty to be binding on the U.S. Nevertheless, in Missouri v. Holland (1920), the Supreme Court held that the Supremacy Clause allows the federal government to make treaties that supersede state law even if such treaties might abrogate states' rights arising under the Tenth Amendment. The decision implied that treaties can be used to legislate in areas otherwise within the exclusive authority of the states, and by extension in areas not within the scope of the federal government or its branches.

However, Missouri's potentially broad interpretation was circumscribed in the 1957 case, Reid v. Covert, when the Supreme Court held that treaties and the laws made pursuant to them must comply with the Constitution. The enforceability of treaties was further limited in the 2008 Supreme Court decision in Medellín v. Texas, which held that even if a treaty may constitute an international commitment, it is not binding domestic law unless it has been implemented by an act of Congress or is itself explicitly "self-executing". Law scholars called the ruling "an invisible constitutional change" that departed from both longtime historical practice and the plain language of the Supremacy Clause.

== Supreme Court interpretations ==
In Marbury v. Madison, 5 U.S. 137 (1803), the Supreme Court held that Congress cannot pass laws that are contrary to the Constitution, and it is the role of the judicial system to interpret what the Constitution permits. Citing the Supremacy Clause, the Court found Section 13 of the Judiciary Act of 1789 to be unconstitutional to the extent it purported to enlarge the original jurisdiction of the Supreme Court beyond that permitted by the Constitution.

In Martin v. Hunter's Lessee, 14 U.S. 304 (1816), and Cohens v. Virginia, 19 U.S. 264 (1821), the Supreme Court held that the Supremacy Clause and the judicial power granted in Article III give the Supreme Court the ultimate power to review state court decisions involving issues arising under the Constitution and laws of the United States. Therefore, the Supreme Court has the final say in matters involving federal law, including constitutional interpretation, and can overrule decisions by state courts.

In McCulloch v. Maryland, 17 U.S. (4 Wheat.) 316 (1819), the Supreme Court reviewed a tax levied by Maryland on the federally incorporated Bank of the United States. The Court found that if a state had the power to tax a federally incorporated institution, then the state effectively had the power to destroy the federal institution, thereby thwarting the intent and purpose of Congress. This would make the states superior to the federal government. The Court found that this would be inconsistent with the Supremacy Clause, which makes federal law superior to state law. The Court therefore held that Maryland's tax on the bank was unconstitutional because the tax violated the Supremacy Clause.

In Ableman v. Booth, 62 U.S. 506 (1859), the Supreme Court held that state courts cannot issue rulings that contradict the decisions of federal courts, citing the Supremacy Clause, and overturning a decision by the Supreme Court of Wisconsin. Specifically, the court found it was illegal for state officials to interfere with the work of U.S. Marshals enforcing the Fugitive Slave Act or to order the release of federal prisoners held for violation of that Act. The Supreme Court reasoned that because the Supremacy Clause established federal law as the law of the land, the Wisconsin courts could not nullify the judgments of a federal court. The Supreme Court held that under Article III of the Constitution, the federal courts have the final jurisdiction in all cases involving the Constitution and laws of the United States, and that the states therefore cannot interfere with federal court judgments.

In Pennsylvania v. Nelson, 350 U.S. 497 (1956) the Supreme Court struck down the Pennsylvania Sedition Act, which made advocating the forceful overthrow of the federal government a crime under Pennsylvania state law. The Supreme Court held that when federal interest in an area of law is sufficiently dominant, federal law must be assumed to preclude enforcement of state laws on the same subject; and a state law is not to be declared a help when state law goes farther than Congress has seen fit to go.

In Cooper v. Aaron, 358 U.S. 1 (1958), the Supreme Court rejected attempts by Arkansas to nullify the Court's school desegregation decision, Brown v. Board of Education. The state of Arkansas, acting on a theory of states' rights, had adopted several statutes designed to nullify the desegregation ruling. The Supreme Court relied on the Supremacy Clause to hold that the federal law controlled and could not be nullified by state statutes or officials.

In Edgar v. MITE Corp., 457 U.S. 624 (1982), the Supreme Court ruled: "A state statute is void to the extent that it actually conflicts with a valid Federal statute". In effect, this means that a state law will be found to violate the Supremacy Clause when either of the following two conditions (or both) exist:

1. Compliance with both the Federal and State laws is impossible
2. "State law stands as an obstacle to the accomplishment and execution of the full purposes and objectives of Congress"

The Supreme Court has also held that only specific, "unmistakable" acts of Congress may be held to trigger the Supremacy Clause. Montana had imposed a 30 percent tax on most sub-bituminous coal mined there. The Commonwealth Edison Company and other utility companies argued, in part, that the Montana tax "frustrated" the broad goals of the federal energy policy. However, in the case of Commonwealth Edison Co. v. Montana, 453 U.S. 609 (1981), the Supreme Court disagreed. Any appeal to claims about "national policy", the Court said, were insufficient to overturn a state law under the Supremacy Clause unless "the nature of the regulated subject matter permits no other conclusion, or that the Congress has unmistakably so ordained".

However, in the case of California v. ARC America Corp., 490 U.S. 93 (1989), the Supreme Court held that if Congress expressly intended to act in an area, this would trigger the enforcement of the Supremacy Clause, and hence nullify the state action. The Supreme Court further found in Crosby v. National Foreign Trade Council, 530 U.S. 363 (2000), that even when a state law is not in direct conflict with a federal law, the state law could still be found unconstitutional under the Supremacy Clause if the "state law is an obstacle to the accomplishment and execution of Congress's full purposes and objectives". Congress need not expressly assert any preemption over state laws either, because Congress may implicitly assume this preemption under the Constitution. Finally, in Murphy v. National Collegiate Athletic Association, the Supreme Court enforced the Supremacy Clause by overturning Federal law as an unconstitutional encroachment into the domain of the states not within of the limits of the Delegated powers, stating that the "Constitution confers on Congress not plenary legislative power but only certain enumerated powers".

== See also ==
- Federal preemption
- Commandeering
- Intergovernmental immunity
- Interposition
- Necessary and Proper Clause
- States' rights
- Section 109 of the Constitution of Australia – analogous section of the Constitution of Australia
- Paramountcy (Canada) – analogous doctrine in Canadian constitutional law
- Primacy of European Union law – analogous doctrine in European Union law
- Rule according to higher law
