= List of United States Supreme Court cases, volume 158 =

Supreme Court of the United States
- Interactive map of Supreme Court of the United States
- 38°53′26″N 77°00′16″W
- Established: March 4, 1789; 236 years ago
- Location: Washington, D.C.
- Coordinates: 38°53′26″N 77°00′16″W
- Composition method: Presidential nomination with Senate confirmation
- Authorised by: Constitution of the United States, Art. III, § 1
- Judge term length: life tenure, subject to impeachment and removal
- Number of positions: 9 (by statute)
- Website: supremecourt.gov

This is a list of cases reported in volume 158 of United States Reports, decided by the Supreme Court of the United States in 1895.

== Justices of the Supreme Court at the time of volume 158 U.S. ==
The Supreme Court is established by Article III, Section 1 of the Constitution of the United States, which says: "The judicial Power of the United States, shall be vested in one supreme Court . . .". The size of the Court is not specified; the Constitution leaves it to Congress to set the number of justices. Under the Judiciary Act of 1789 Congress originally fixed the number of justices at six (one chief justice and five associate justices). Since 1789 Congress has varied the size of the Court from six to seven, nine, ten, and back to nine justices (always including one chief justice).

When the cases in volume 158 were decided the Court comprised the following nine members:

Portrait	Justice	Office	Home State	Succeeded	Date confirmed by the Senate (Vote)	Tenure on Supreme Court
	Melville Fuller	Chief Justice	Illinois	Morrison Waite	July 20, 1888 (41–20)	October 8, 1888 – July 4, 1910 (Died)
	Stephen Johnson Field	Associate Justice	California	newly created seat	March 10, 1863 (Acclamation)	May 10, 1863 – December 1, 1897 (Retired)
	John Marshall Harlan	Associate Justice	Kentucky	David Davis	November 29, 1877 (Acclamation)	December 10, 1877 – October 14, 1911 (Died)
	Horace Gray	Associate Justice	Massachusetts	Nathan Clifford	December 20, 1881 (51–5)	January 9, 1882 – September 15, 1902 (Died)
	David Josiah Brewer	Associate Justice	Kansas	Stanley Matthews	December 18, 1889 (53–11)	January 6, 1890 – March 28, 1910 (Died)
	Henry Billings Brown	Associate Justice	Michigan	Samuel Freeman Miller	December 29, 1890 (Acclamation)	January 5, 1891 – May 28, 1906 (Retired)
	George Shiras Jr.	Associate Justice	Pennsylvania	Joseph P. Bradley	July 26, 1892 (Acclamation)	October 10, 1892 – February 23, 1903 (Retired)
	Howell Edmunds Jackson	Associate Justice	Tennessee	Lucius Quintus Cincinnatus Lamar	February 18, 1893 (Acclamation)	March 4, 1893 – August 8, 1895 (Died)
	Edward Douglass White	Associate Justice	Louisiana	Samuel Blatchford	February 19, 1894 (Acclamation)	March 12, 1894 – December 18, 1910 (Continued as chief justice)

== Notable Case in 158 U.S. ==
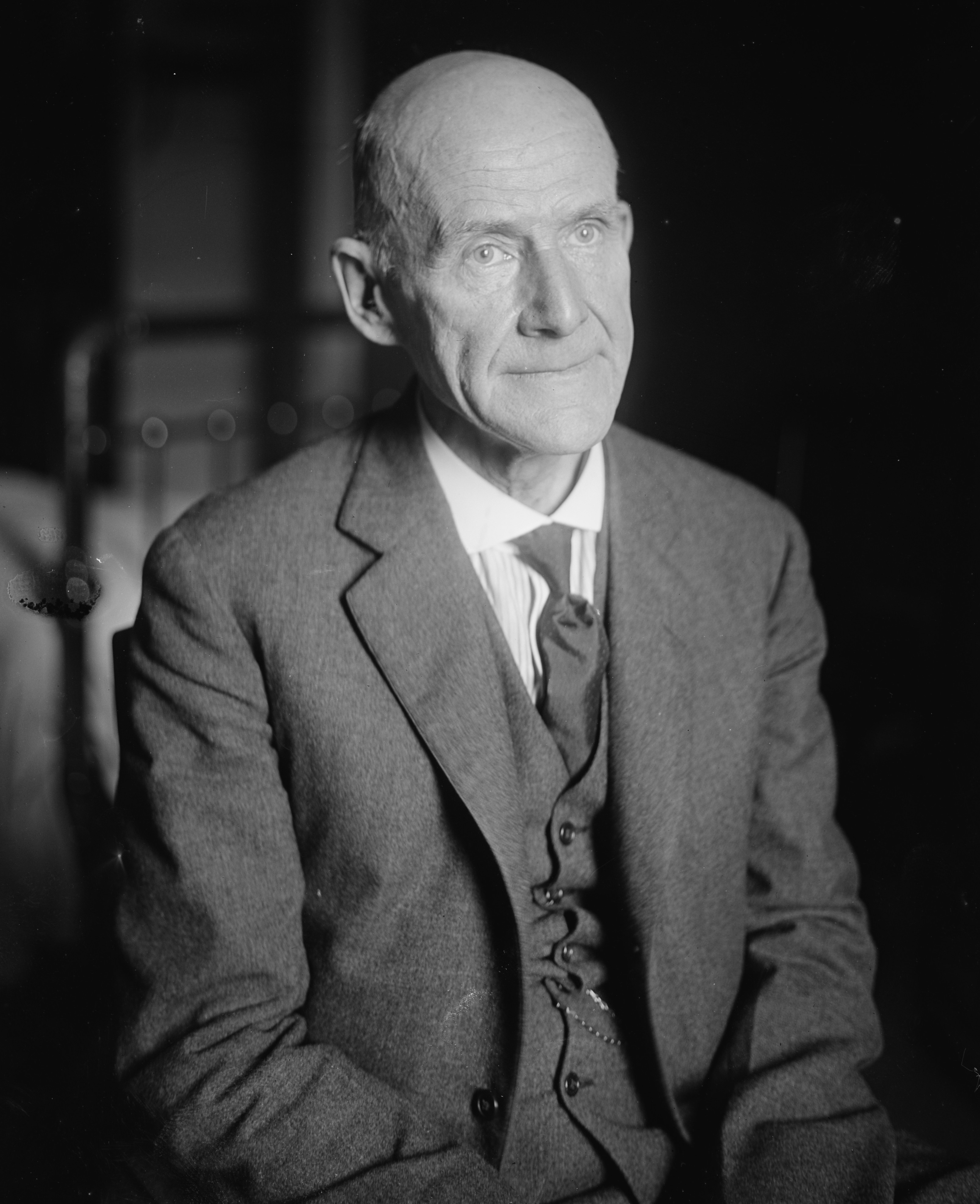
Eugene V. Debs

=== In re Debs ===
In re Debs, 158 U.S. 564 (1895), is a US labor law case. Eugene V. Debs, president of the American Railway Union, had been involved in the Pullman Strike earlier in 1894 and challenged the federal injunction ordering the strikers back to work where they would face being fired. The injunction had been issued because of the violent nature of the strike. However, Debs refused to end the strike and was cited for contempt of court; he appealed the decision. The main question was whether the federal government had a right to issue the injunction, which dealt with both interstate and intrastate commerce and shipping on rail cars. The Court held that the U.S. government had a right to regulate interstate commerce and ensure the operations of the Postal Service, along with a responsibility to "ensure the general welfare of the public."

== Citation style ==
Under the Judiciary Act of 1789 the federal court structure at the time comprised District Courts, which had general trial jurisdiction; Circuit Courts, which had mixed trial and appellate (from the US District Courts) jurisdiction; and the United States Supreme Court, which had appellate jurisdiction over the federal District and Circuit courts—and for certain issues over state courts. The Supreme Court also had limited original jurisdiction (i.e., in which cases could be filed directly with the Supreme Court without first having been heard by a lower federal or state court). There were one or more federal District Courts and/or Circuit Courts in each state, territory, or other geographical region.

The Judiciary Act of 1891 created the United States Courts of Appeals and reassigned the jurisdiction of most routine appeals from the district and circuit courts to these appellate courts. The Act created nine new courts that were originally known as the "United States Circuit Courts of Appeals." The new courts had jurisdiction over most appeals of lower court decisions. The Supreme Court could review either legal issues that a court of appeals certified or decisions of court of appeals by writ of certiorari.

Bluebook citation style is used for case names, citations, and jurisdictions.

- "# Cir." = United States Court of Appeals
  - e.g., "3d Cir." = United States Court of Appeals for the Third Circuit
- "C.C.D." = United States Circuit Court for the District of . . .
  - e.g.,"C.C.D.N.J." = United States Circuit Court for the District of New Jersey
- "D." = United States District Court for the District of . . .
  - e.g.,"D. Mass." = United States District Court for the District of Massachusetts
- "E." = Eastern; "M." = Middle; "N." = Northern; "S." = Southern; "W." = Western
  - e.g.,"C.C.S.D.N.Y." = United States Circuit Court for the Southern District of New York
  - e.g.,"M.D. Ala." = United States District Court for the Middle District of Alabama
- "Ct. Cl." = United States Court of Claims
- The abbreviation of a state's name alone indicates the highest appellate court in that state's judiciary at the time.
  - e.g.,"Pa." = Supreme Court of Pennsylvania
  - e.g.,"Me." = Supreme Judicial Court of Maine

== List of cases in volume 158 U.S. ==
Case Name	Page & year	Opinion of the Court	Concurring opinion(s)	Dissenting opinion(s)	Lower Court	Disposition
Roberts v. Northern P.R.R. Co.	1 (1895)	Shiras	none	none	C.C.W.D. Wis.	affirmed
In re Buchanan	31 (1895)	Fuller	none	none	N.Y.	dismissed
Newport et al. Co. v. Pace	36 (1895)	Fuller	none	none	C.C.W.D. Tenn.	affirmed
Koenigsberger v. Richmond S.M. Co.	41 (1895)	Gray	none	none	C.C.D.S.D.	affirmed
Mattingly v. Northwestern Va. R.R. Co.	53 (1895)	Fuller	none	none	C.C.D.W. Va.	reversed
Du Bois v. Kirk	58 (1895)	Brown	none	none	C.C.W.D. Pa.	affirmed
Risdon I.L. Works v. Medart	68 (1895)	Brown	none	none	C.C.N.D. Cal.	reversed
Whitney v. Taylor	85 (1895)	Brewer	none	none	C.C.N.D. Cal.	affirmed
Gulf et al. Ry. Co. v. Hefley	98 (1895)	Brewer	none	none	Milam Cnty. Ct.	reversed
Ellenwood v. Marietta C. Co.	105 (1895)	Gray	none	none	C.C.S.D. Ohio	affirmed
Johnson v. Sayre	109 (1895)	Gray	none	none	C.C.E.D. Va.	reversed
Pacific R.R. Co. v. United States	118 (1895)	Shiras	none	none	Ct. Cl.	affirmed
Beardsley v. Arkansas & L. Ry. Co.	123 (1895)	Fuller	none	none	C.C.E.D. Ark.	dismissed
White v. Joyce	128 (1895)	Shiras	none	none	Sup. Ct. D.C.	reversed
Keyes v. Eureka C.M. Co.	150 (1895)	Fuller	none	none	C.C.N.D. Cal.	affirmed
Catholic Bishop v. Gibbon	155 (1895)	Brewer	none	none	C.C.D. Wash.	affirmed
Teall v. Schroder	172 (1895)	Field	none	none	C.C.N.D. Cal.	affirmed
Sayward v. Denny	180 (1895)	Fuller	none	none	Wash.	dismissed
The Oregon	186 (1895)	Brown	none	none	C.C.D. Or.	reversed
Kennedy v. Magone	212 (1895)	White	none	none	C.C.S.D.N.Y.	affirmed
De Sollar v. Hanscome	216 (1895)	Brewer	none	none	C.C.D. Colo.	affirmed
Episcopal C.M. v. Brown	222 (1895)	White	none	none	C.C.N.D. Ill.	affirmed
Wright v. United States	232 (1895)	White	none	none	C.C.E.D. Tex.	affirmed
Stoneroad v. Stoneroad	240 (1895)	White	none	none	Sup. Ct. Terr. N.M.	reversed
Russell v. Maxwell L.G. Co.	253 (1895)	Brewer	none	none	C.C.D. Colo.	affirmed
Boyd v. Janesville H.T. Co.	260 (1895)	Shiras	none	none	C.C.W.D. Wis.	affirmed
Virginia v. Tennessee	267 (1895)	Fuller	none	none	original	case stricken
Northern P.R.R. Co. v. Urlin	271 (1895)	Shiras	none	none	C.C.D. Mont.	affirmed
Todd v. United States	278 (1895)	Brewer	none	none	N.D. Ala.	reversed
Union P. Ry. Co. v. Wyler	285 (1895)	White	none	none	C.C.W.D. Mo.	reversed
Richards v. Chase E. Co.	299 (1895)	Brown	none	none	C.C.N.D. Ill.	affirmed
The Beaconsfield	303 (1895)	Brown	none	none	2d Cir.	certification
Town of Andes v. Ely	312 (1895)	Brewer	none	none	C.C.N.D.N.Y.	affirmed
Union P. Ry. Co. v. Harris	326 (1895)	Fuller	none	none	8th Cir.	affirmed
Boston & A.R.R. Co. v. O'Reilly	334 (1895)	Shiras	none	none	C.C.D. Mass.	reversed
National Park Bank v. Remsen	337 (1895)	Brewer	none	none	C.C.S.D.N.Y.	affirmed
United States v. Smith	346 (1895)	Brown	none	none	Ct. Cl.	affirmed
Shipman v. Straitsville C.M. Co.	356 (1895)	Brown	none	none	C.C.S.D. Ohio	reversed
Eby v. King	366 (1895)	Brown	none	none	C.C.N.D. Ill.	affirmed
Rich v. Braxton	375 (1895)	Harlan	none	none	C.C.D.W. Va.	affirmed
Connors v. United States	408 (1895)	Harlan	none	none	D. Colo.	affirmed
Abraham v. Ordway	416 (1895)	Harlan	none	none	C.C.S.D.N.Y.	affirmed
Cutler v. Huston	423 (1895)	Harlan	none	none	Sup. Ct. D.C.	affirmed
New York et al. R.R. Co. v. Pennsylvania	431 (1895)	Shiras	none	none	Pa.	affirmed
Tioga R.R. Co. v. Pennsylvania	440 (1895)	Shiras	none	none	Pa.	affirmed
Bennett v. Harkrader	441 (1895)	Brewer	none	none	D. Alaska	affirmed
Harter v. Twohig	448 (1895)	Fuller	none	none	C.C.D. Neb.	reversed
Colvin v. City of Jacksonville	456 (1895)	Fuller	none	none	C.C.S.D. Fla.	affirmed
Lehigh V.R.R. Co. v. Kearney	461 (1895)	Fuller	none	none	C.C.D.N.J.	reversed
Green v. Bogue	478 (1895)	Shiras	none	none	C.C.N.D. Ill.	affirmed
Clark v. Reeder	505 (1895)	Fuller	none	none	C.C.D.W. Va.	affirmed
In re Quarles	532 (1895)	Gray	none	none	C.C.N.D. Ga.	habeas corpus denied
Lem Moon Sing v. United States	538 (1895)	Harlan	none	none	N.D. Cal.	affirmed
Beard v. United States	550 (1895)	Harlan	none	none	C.C.W.D. Ark.	reversed
In re Debs	564 (1895)	Brewer	none	none	C.C.N.D. Ill.	habeas corpus denied
Pollock v. Farmers' Loan & Trust Co.	601 (1895)	Fuller	none	Harlan; Brown; Jackson; White	C.C.S.D.N.Y.	reversed

== See also ==
- Certificate of division
