= Wilbur J. Cohen Federal Building =

Office building in Washington, D.C.

- U.S. National Register of Historic Places
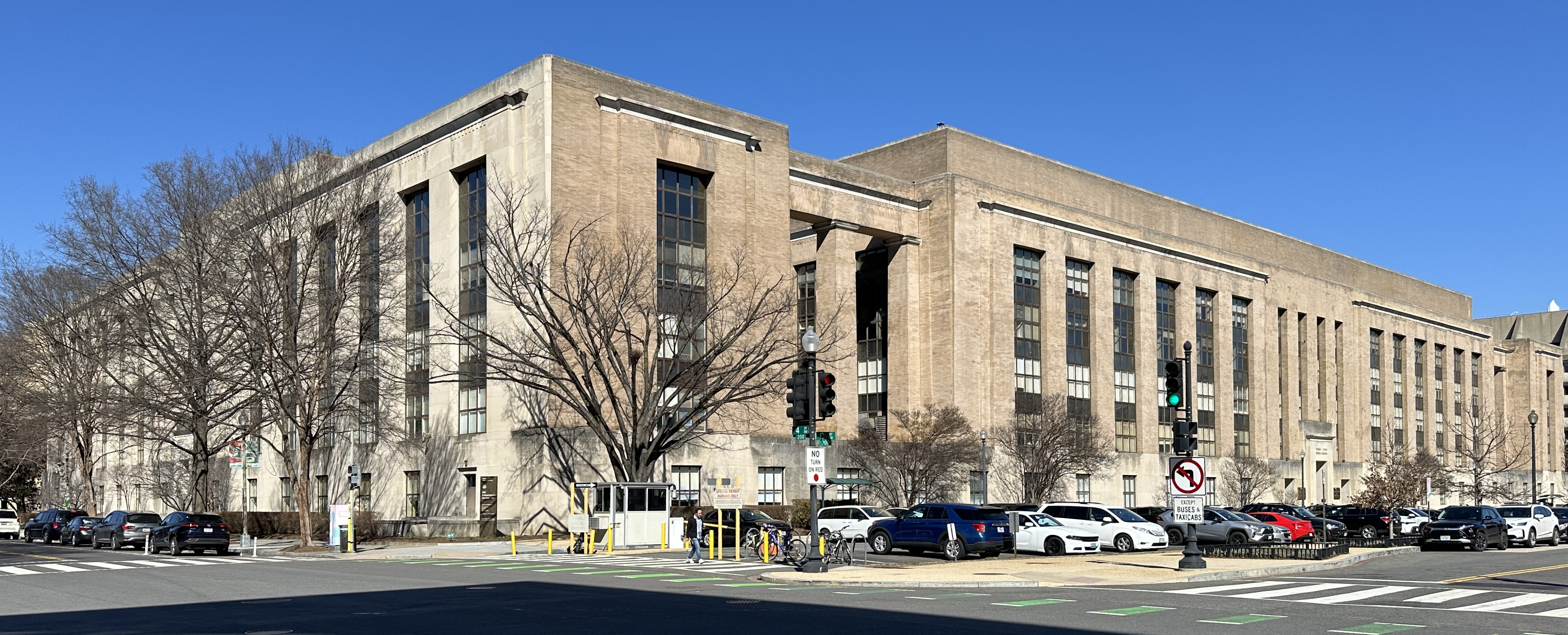
- Wilbur J. Cohen Federal Building in 2026

- Location within Central Washington, D.C. Location within the District of Columbia Location within the United States
- Location: 330 Independence Avenue SW
- Coordinates: 38°53′14.64″N 77°1′.84″W
- Area: 3 acres (1.2 ha)
- Built: 1939
- Architect: Charles Zeller Klauder; Office of the Supervising Architect
- Architectural style: Egyptian Revival
- NRHP reference No.: 07000639
- Added to NRHP: July 6, 2007

The Wilbur J. Cohen Federal Building is a historic building at 330 Independence Avenue SW in the Southwest quadrant of Washington, D.C., United States. Originally known as the Social Security Administration Building, it is recognized for its architecture.

== History ==
The building was designed by Charles Zeller Klauder and the Office of the Supervising Architect under Louis A. Simon, in the Stripped Classical style in 1939. The building has Egyptian elements as well.

Construction was completed in 1940, but Social Security did not become the building's first occupant. Instead, the threat of war created a need for space for defense agencies, and the building was made available to the War Department and the National Defense Commission. After the war, the Federal Security Agency, under which the Social Security Board had been placed in 1939, moved into the building. In 1953, FSA's successor, the Department of Health, Education and Welfare, part of which became the Department of Health and Human Services in 1980, became the primary occupant. Voice of America was headquartered in the building beginning in 1954.

On April 28, 1988, the building was renamed the Wilbur J. Cohen Federal Building in honor of the Social Security Board's first professional employee and the former Secretary of Health, Education and Welfare. On July 6, 2007, the building was added to the National Register of Historic Places. Voice of America (VOA) and the U.S. Agency for Global Media (USAGM) were the building's principal occupants.

=== Planned disposal ===
In 2020, the General Services Administration notified VOA that the agency would have to leave the building by 2028. At the time, VOA's offices there were described as "highly inefficient". Under the second presidency of Donald Trump, in May 2025, federal officials agreed to expedite the sale of the building. This prompted concerns that the building could be demolished, as the cost of renovations would likely be prohibitive. On November 6, 2025, a public campaign asking federal agencies and Congress to ensure that historic preservation laws are followed and that the Cohen Building is protected for future generations was launched by The Living New Deal Project through a public petition titled "Save the Wilbur J. Cohen Federal Building – the "Sistine Chapel of New Deal Art."

Preservationists and art historians advocated for saving the building's interior murals by Seymour Fogel, Philip Guston, Ben Shahn, and Ethel Magafan and Jenne Magafan, as well as its exterior relief sculptures by Henry Kreis and Emma Lu Davis. There were also calls for the Jewish Museum in New York City to save the murals. The Ben Shahn and Seymour Fogel pieces, which are painted using buon fresco and fresco secco techniques, are chemically bound to the building's walls and are difficult if not impossible to remove without destroying them. The General Services Administration began giving tours of the art in early 2026.

== Gallery ==
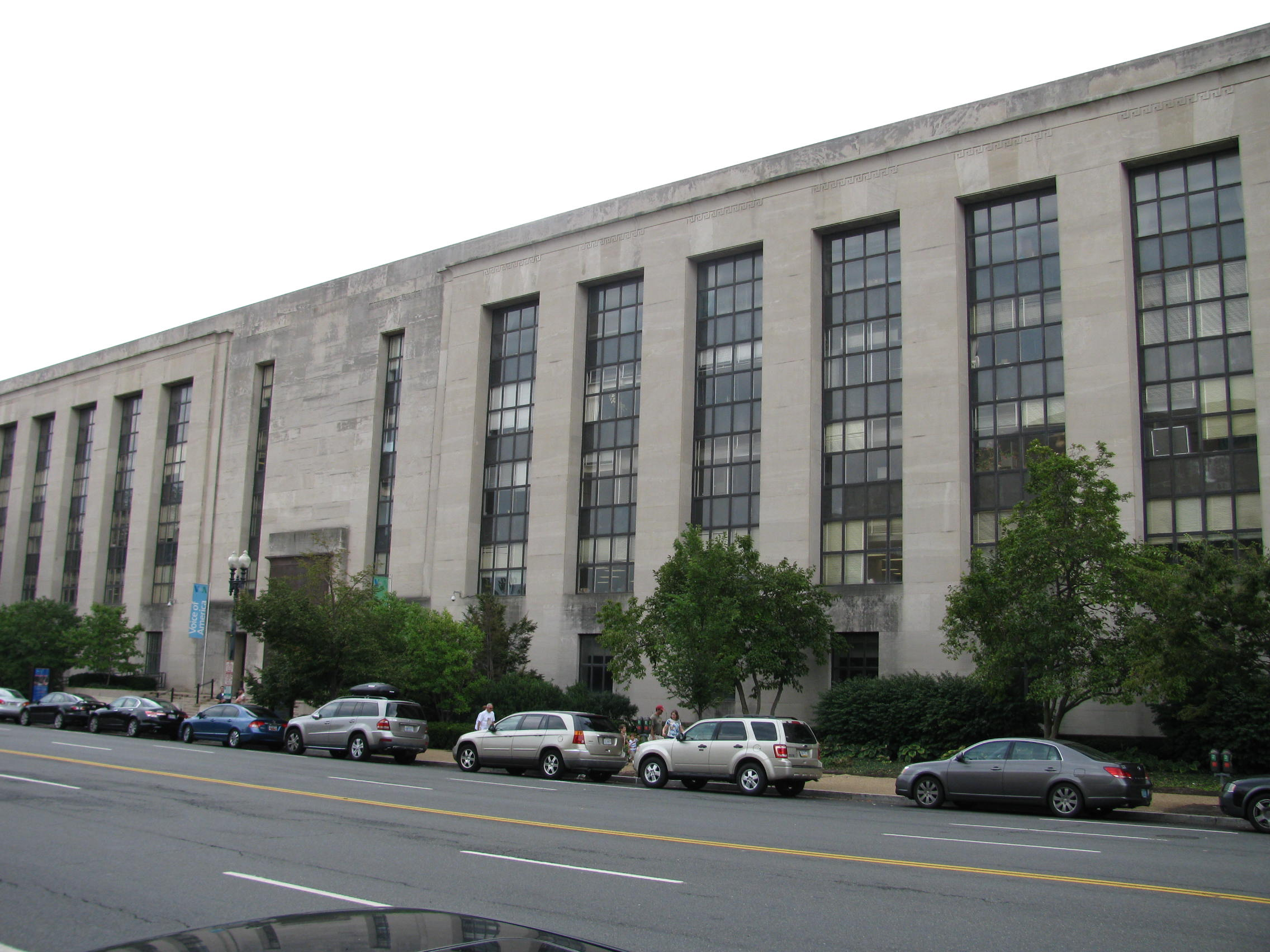
North side oblique view

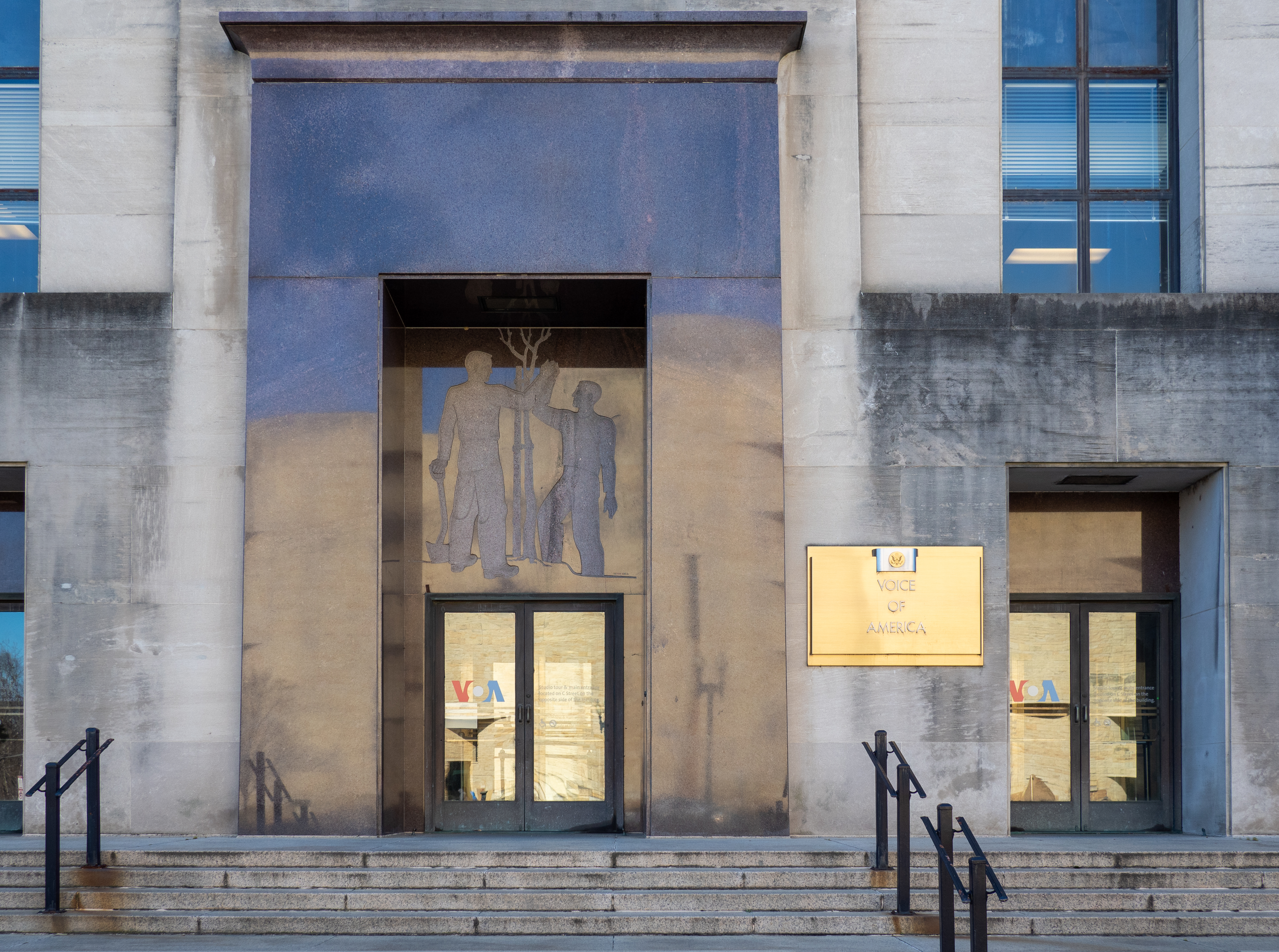
North entrance - with the relief "The Growth of Social Security" by Henry Kreis

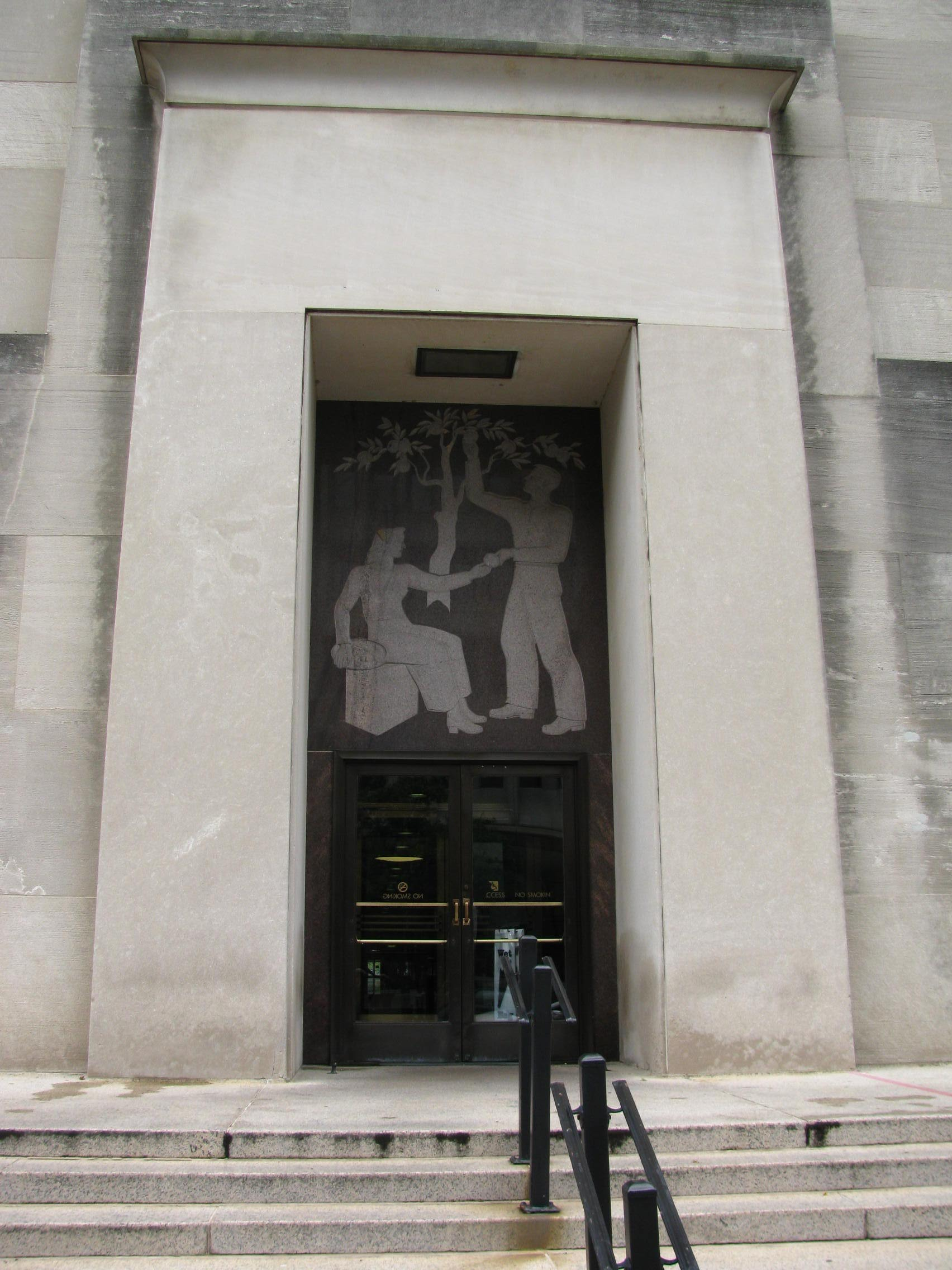
East entrance - "The Benefits of Social Security" by Kreis

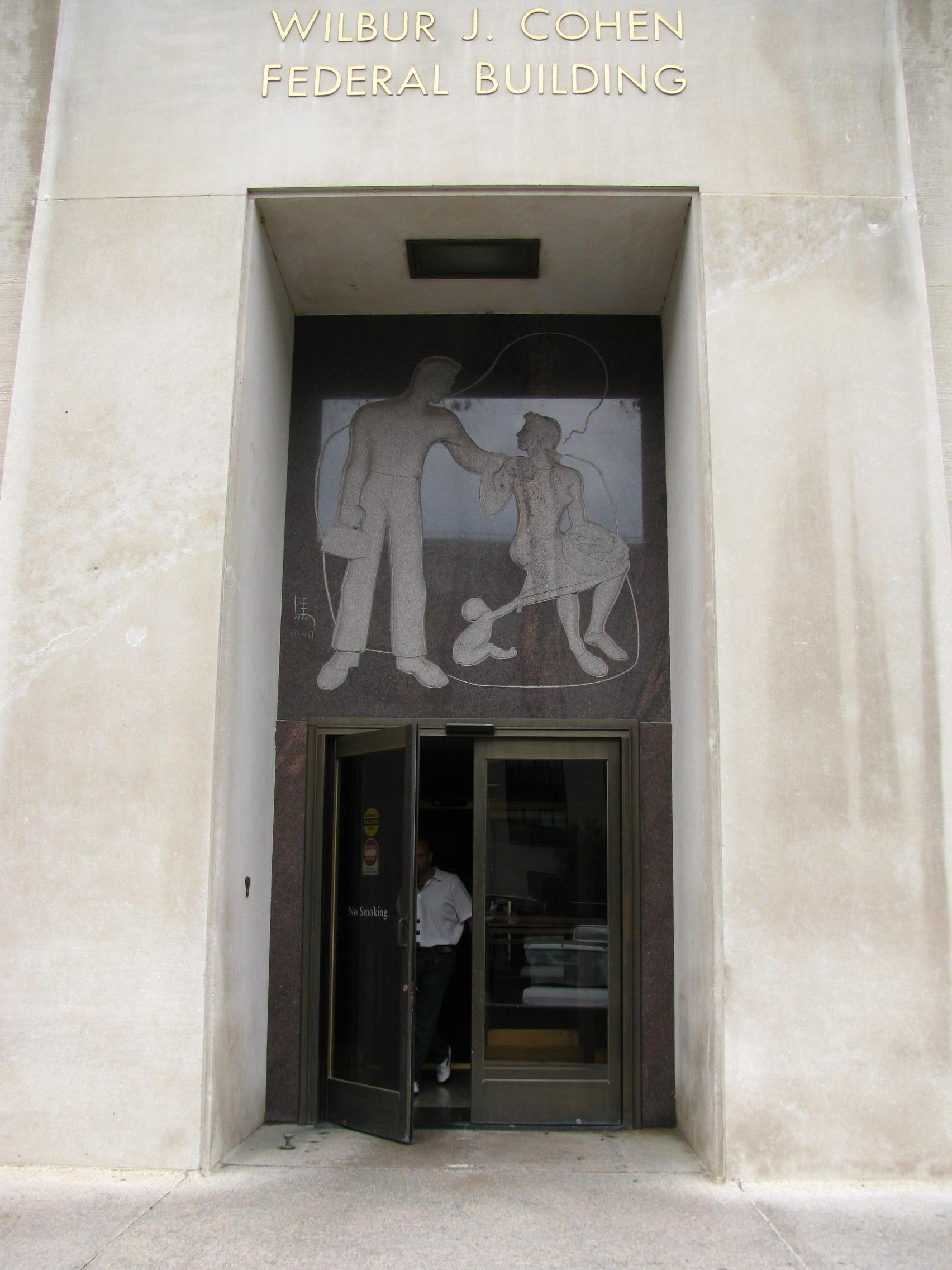
South entrance - "Family Group" by Emma Lu Davis

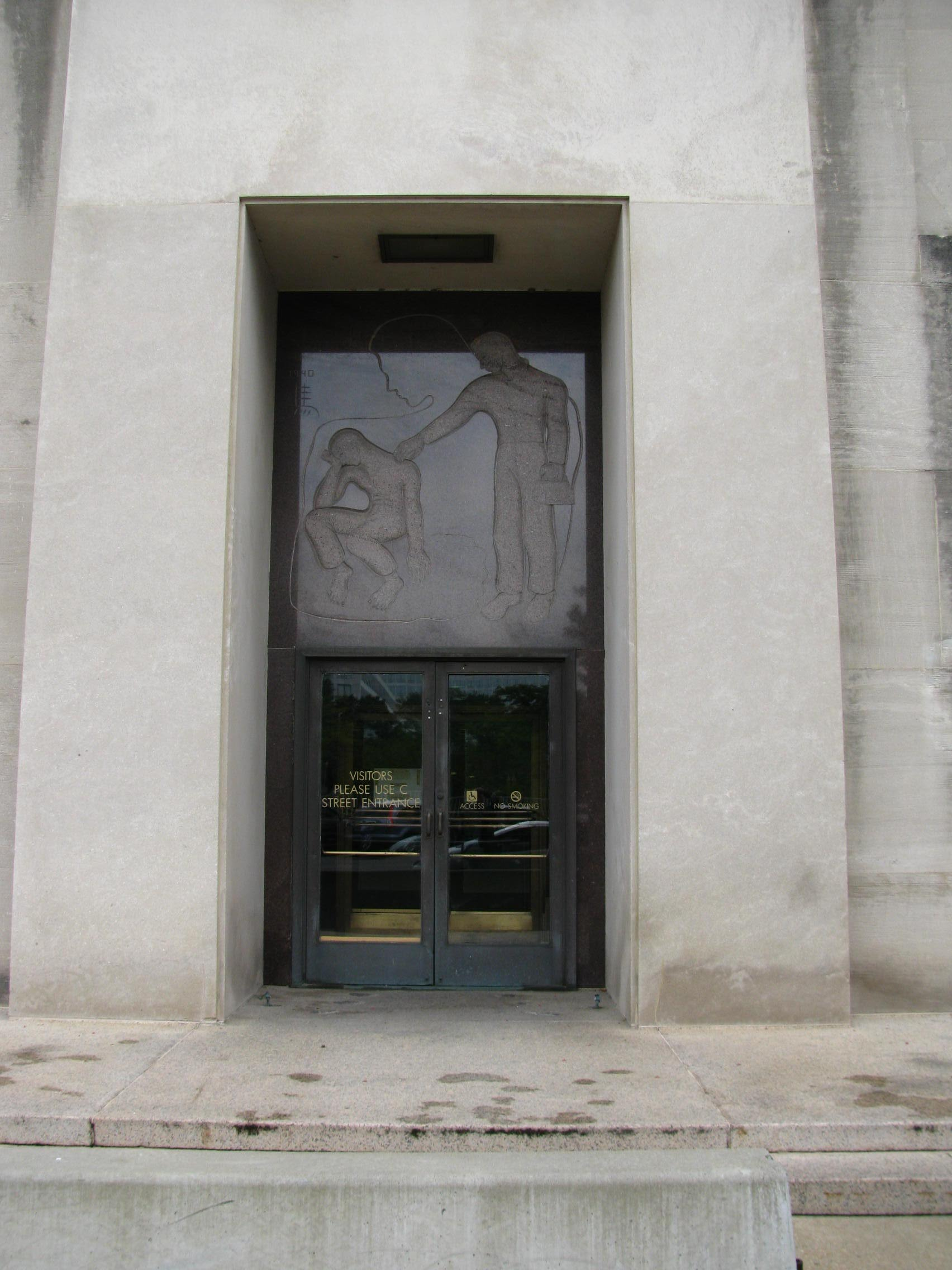
West entrance - "Unemployment Compensation" by Davis

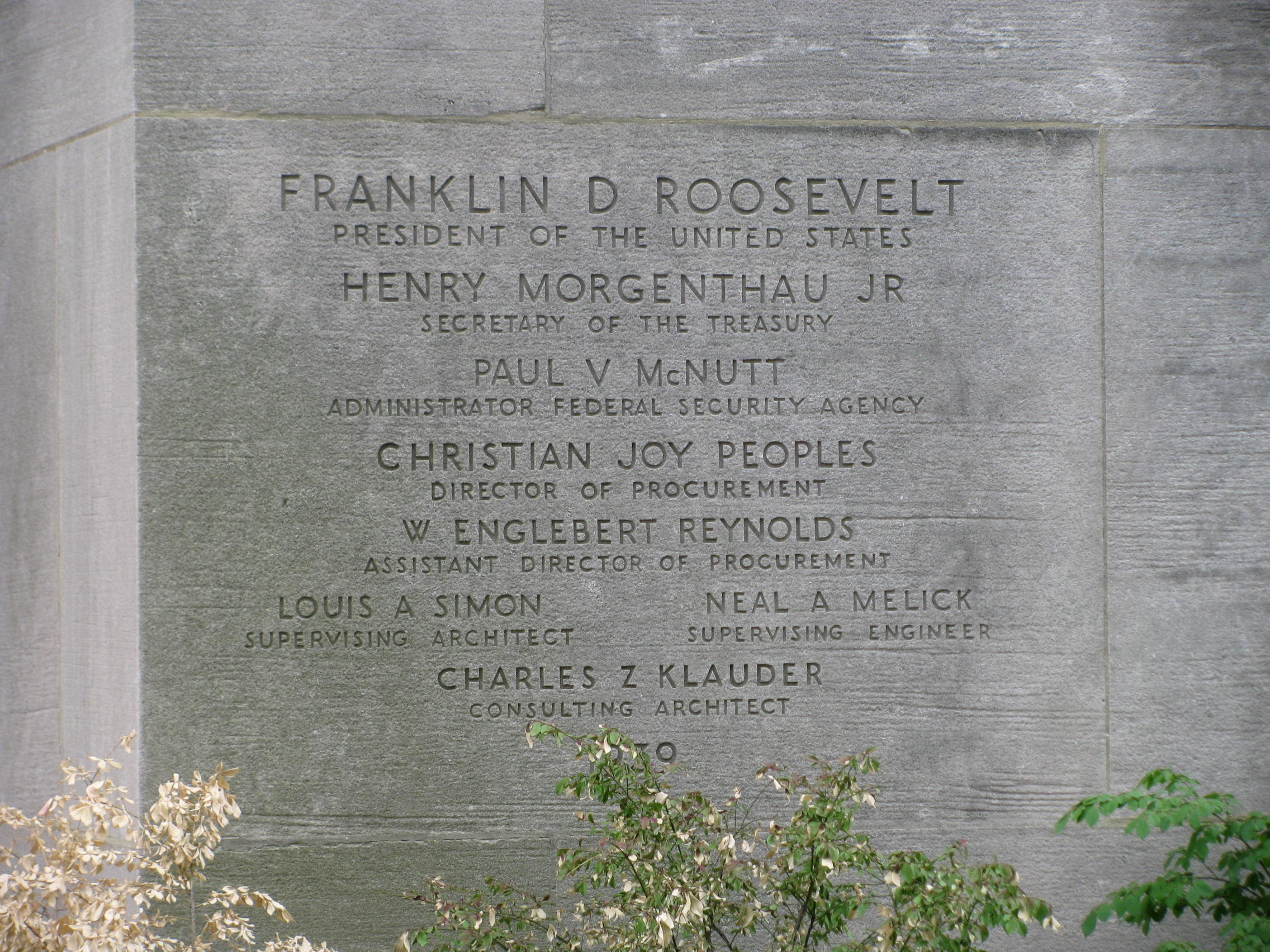
Cornerstone

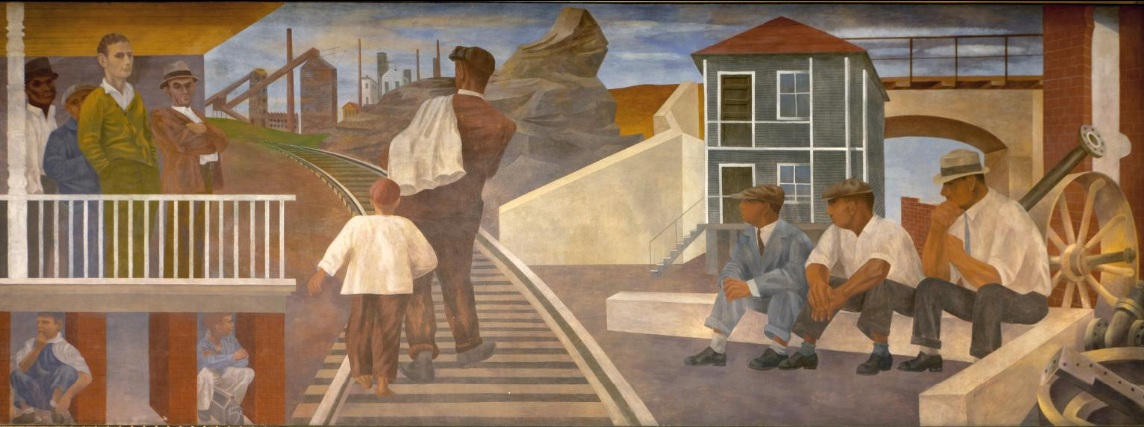
Section of the mural "The Meaning of Social Security" by Ben Shahn, completed in 1942

== See also ==
- Railroad Retirement Board Building on the same block
- National Register of Historic Places listings in central Washington, D.C.
