= Metromedia, Inc. v. San Diego =

- Supreme Court of the United States

Argued February 25, 1981 Decided July 2, 1981
- Full case name: Metromedia, Inc., et al. v. City of San Diego, et al.
- Citations: 453 U.S. 490 (more) 101 S. Ct. 2882; 69 L. Ed. 2d 800

Holding
- San Diego's general ban on signs carrying noncommercial advertising is invalid under the First and Fourteenth Amendments.

Court membership
- Chief Justice Warren E. Burger Associate Justices William J. Brennan Jr. · Potter Stewart; Byron White · Thurgood Marshall; Harry Blackmun · Lewis F. Powell Jr. William Rehnquist · John P. Stevens

Case opinions
- Plurality: White, joined by Stewart, Marshall, Powell; Stevens (parts I–IV)
- Concurrence: Brennan, joined by Blackmun
- Concurrence: Stevens
- Dissent: Burger
- Dissent: Rehnquist
- Dissent: Stevens (parts V–VII)

Laws applied
- U.S. Const. amend. I

Metromedia, Inc. v. San Diego, 453 U.S. 490 (1981), was a United States Supreme Court case in which it was decided that cities could regulate billboards, and that municipal governments could not treat commercial outdoor advertising more harshly than noncommercial messages.
