= Postal Service v. Council of Greenburgh Civic Ass'ns =

- Supreme Court of the United States

Argued April 21, 1981 Decided June 25, 1981
- Full case name: United States Postal Service v. Council of Greenburgh Civic Associations
- Docket no.: 80-608
- Citations: 453 U.S. 114 (more)
- Argument: Oral argument

Holding
- A statute prohibiting the deposit of unstamped 'mailable matter' in a USPS-approved mailbox is constitutional.

Court membership
- Chief Justice Warren E. Burger Associate Justices William J. Brennan Jr. · Potter Stewart; Byron White · Thurgood Marshall; Harry Blackmun · Lewis F. Powell Jr. William Rehnquist · John P. Stevens

Case opinions
- Majority: Rehnquist, Burger, Stewart, Blackmun, Powell
- Concurrence: Brennan
- Concurrence: White
- Dissent: Marshall
- Dissent: Stevens

Postal Service v. Council of Greenburgh Civic Ass'ns, 453 U.S. 114 (1981), is a U.S. Supreme Court case which "upheld the constitutionality of a statute that prohibited the deposit of unstamped 'mailable matter' in a mailbox approved by the United States Postal Service."

== Background ==
The Council of Greenburgh Civic Associations, a group of civic organizations based in Westchester County, New York, had a history of placing unstamped pamphlets in private mailboxes. In June 1976, the White Plains postmaster notified one member, the Saw Mill Civic Association, that their actions violated 18 U.S.C § 1725. The Postmaster then warned the CGCA that repeated violations would incur $300 fines.

Citing the First Amendment of the United States Constitution, the CGCA sued the USPS for injunctive relief in February 1977. The District Court for the Southern District of New York dismissed the complaint for failure to state a claim. However, the United States Court of Appeals, Second Circuit remanded the case on the basis that the dismissal prevented the CGCA from demonstrating alleged constitutional handicaps.

== Opinion of the Court ==
In a 7-2 majority opinion delivered by Justice William Rehnquist, the Supreme Court upheld 18 U.S.C § 1725. The Court cited Adderley v. Florida and Greer v. Spock to show that "[The] First Amendment does not guarantee access to property simply because it is owned or controlled by the government."

=== Brennan's Concurrence ===
Justice William J. Brennan Jr. concurred with the Court's judgment, but partially disagreed with the reasoning. He opined that the majority opinion largely glossed over the question of government property as a public forum. Nevertheless, he viewed the law as "a reasonable time, place, and manner regulation."

=== White's Concurrencee ===
Justice Byron White concurred with the judgment on the basis that the CGCA did not argue for using the mail for free delivery. He elaborates that for those who pay the postage, the mail serves as a public forum for the written word.

=== Marshall's Dissent ===
Justice Thurgood Marshall dissented by claiming that the code in question was unconstitutionally vague, as previous decisions regarding protection against mail fraud or privacy invasions, included language specifically proscribing such acts. He further postulated that distribution of letters and handbills served as a political medium for disadvantaged groups.

=== Stevens' Dissent ===
Justice John P. Stevens agreed with Marshall's proposal for a less drastic solution, but differed in reasoning in that he viewed the mailbox as private property.
