= Railroad Retirement Board =

Independent agency of the United States government

Agency overview
- Formed: August 29, 1935
- Headquarters: William O. Lipinski Federal Building, Chicago, Illinois, United States
- Agency executive: Erhard R. Chorle, Chairman
- Website: www.rrb.gov

The U.S. Railroad Retirement Board (RRB) is an independent agency in the executive branch of the United States government created in 1935 to administer a social insurance program providing retirement benefits to the country's railroad workers.

The RRB serves U.S. railroad workers and their families, and administers retirement, survivor, unemployment, and sickness benefits. Consequently, railroad workers do not participate in the United States Social Security program. The RRB's headquarters are in Chicago, Illinois, with field offices throughout the country.

In connection with the retirement program, the RRB has administrative responsibilities under the Social Security Act for certain benefit payments and railroad workers' Medicare coverage.

During fiscal year 2023, retirement survivor benefits of $14.1 billion were paid to about 508,000 beneficiaries, while net unemployment-sickness benefits of $92.9 million were paid to more than 15,000 claimants.

In 2023, the average annuity paid to career rail employees was $4,310 per month, the average annuity paid for all retired rail employees was $3,450 per month, and the average retirement benefit under Social Security was $1,810 per month.

Railroad retirement benefit payments are financed primarily by payroll taxes paid by railroad employers and their employees. Since 2002, funds not needed immediately for benefit payments or administrative expenses have been invested by an independent National Railroad Retirement Investment Trust, which qualifies as non profit 501(c)(28). As of 2023, trust-managed assets and RRB assets held in reserve totaled almost $25 billion.

== History ==
The assignment, furlough, and recall of most railroad employees was based on seniority. When work became scarce, employees with the least seniority were the first to be laid-off. The majority of railroaders were covered by pension plans, but private pension payments could be reduced if revenues were down, and many had been cut drastically by 1934.

This practice created a conflict between older employees, who preferred the certainty of a paycheck to an unreliable pension, and younger employees, who saw opportunity for increased job security if superannuated workers could be induced to retire by guaranteeing them a decent pension.

Railroad workers formed an association to agitate for government action. The Department of Labor proposed its own plan in response, eventually compromising with the workers to produce the Railroad Retirement Act of 1934. This legislation anticipated the Social Security Act of 1935, which covered most other employees, and was tailored to address the specific concerns of railroad workers.

The Act was soon found unconstitutional, but President Franklin D. Roosevelt intervened to push for a lasting compromise. This pressure resulted in the Railroad Retirement Act of 1935, which set up a staff retirement plan providing annuities based on an employee's creditable railroad earnings and service, and Railroad Retirement and Carrier Taxing Acts of 1937, which made railroad employees the only private-sector workers outside the Social Security system to have a separate, federally administered pension plan. More than 95,000 elderly and disabled railroad employees applied for pension benefits by the end of 1937.

Since passage of the Railroad Retirement Acts of the 1930s, numerous other railroad laws have subsequently been enacted.

While the railroad retirement system has remained separate from the social security system, the two systems are closely coordinated with regard to earnings credits, benefit payments, and taxes. The financing of the two systems is linked through a financial interchange under which, in effect, the portion of railroad retirement annuities that is equivalent to social security benefits is coordinated with the social security system. The purpose of this financial coordination is to place the social security trust funds in the same position they would be in if railroad service were covered by the social security program instead of the railroad retirement program.

Legislation enacted in 1974 restructured railroad retirement benefits into two tiers, so as to coordinate them more fully with social security benefits. The first tier is based on combined railroad retirement and social security credits, using social security benefit formulas. The second tier is based on railroad service only and is comparable to the pensions paid over and above social security benefits in other industries.

The railroad unemployment insurance system was also established in the 1930s. The Great Depression demonstrated the need for unemployment compensation programs, and state unemployment programs had been established under the Social Security Act in 1935. While the state unemployment programs generally covered railroad workers, railroad operations which crossed state lines caused special problems. Unemployed railroad workers were denied compensation by one state because their employers had paid unemployment taxes in another state. Although there were cases where employees appeared to be covered in more than one state, they often did not qualify in any.

A federal study commission, which reported on the nationwide state plans for unemployment insurance, recommended that railroad workers be covered by a separate plan because of the complications their coverage had caused the state plans. Congress subsequently enacted the Railroad Unemployment Insurance Act in June 1938. The Act established a system of benefits for unemployed railroaders, financed entirely by railroad employers and administered by the RRB. Sickness benefits were added in 1946.

The agency offices were originally located in Washington, DC. They relocated to Chicago, IL, as part of a decentralization of government offices after the attack on Pearl Harbor and the entry of the United States into World War II.

== Railroad Retirement Act ==
Under the Railroad Retirement Act, retirement and disability annuities are paid to railroad workers with at least 10 years of service. Such annuities are also payable to workers with 5 years of service if performed after 1995.

=== Provisions ===
Full age annuities are payable at age 60 to workers with 30 years of service. For those with less than 30 years of service, reduced annuities are payable at age 62 and unreduced annuities are payable at full retirement age, which is gradually rising from 65 to 67, depending on the year of birth. Disability annuities can be paid on the basis of total or occupational disability. Annuities are also payable to spouses and divorced spouses of retired workers and to widow(er)s, surviving divorced spouses, remarried widow(er)s, children, and parents of deceased railroad workers. Qualified railroad retirement beneficiaries are covered by Medicare in the same way as social security beneficiaries.

As noted, the RRB pays retirement annuities to employees, as well as their spouses and/or divorced spouses, if the employee had at least 10 years of railroad service, or 5 years if performed after 1995. However, for survivor benefits, there is an additional requirement that the employee's last regular employment before retirement or death was in the railroad industry. If a railroad employee or his or her survivors do not qualify for railroad retirement benefits, the RRB transfers the employee's railroad retirement credits to the Social Security Administration, where they are treated as social security credits.

=== Financing ===
Payroll taxes paid by railroad employers and their employees are the primary source of funding for the railroad retirement-survivor benefit programs. Railroad retirement taxes, which have historically been higher than social security taxes, are calculated, like benefit payments, on a two-tier basis. Railroad retirement tier I payroll taxes are coordinated with social security taxes so that employees and employers pay tier I taxes at the same rate as social security taxes. In addition, both employees and employers pay tier II taxes which are used to finance railroad retirement benefit payments over and above social security levels. These tier II taxes are based on the ratio of certain asset balances to the sum of benefit payments and administrative expenses.

Revenues in excess of benefit payments are invested to provide additional trust fund income. The National Railroad Retirement Investment Trust manages and invests railroad retirement assets. Railroad retirement funds are invested in non-governmental assets, as well as in governmental securities.

Additional trust fund income is derived from the financial interchange with the social security trust funds, revenues from federal income taxes on railroad retirement benefits, and appropriations from general treasury revenues provided after 1974 as part of a phase-out of certain vested dual benefits.

== Railroad Unemployment Insurance Act ==
Under the Railroad Unemployment Insurance Act, unemployment insurance benefits are paid to railroad workers who are unemployed but ready, willing, and able to work and sickness benefits to railroad workers who are unable to work because of illness or injury. The RRB also operates a placement service to assist unemployed railroaders in securing employment.

=== Benefit Year ===
A new unemployment-sickness benefit year begins every July 1, with eligibility generally based on railroad service and earnings in the preceding calendar year. Up to 26 weeks of normal unemployment or sickness benefits are payable to an individual in a benefit year. Additional extended benefits are payable to persons with 10 or more years of service.

=== Financing ===
The railroad unemployment-sickness benefit program is financed by taxes on railroad employers under an experience-rating system. Each employer's payroll tax rate is determined annually by the RRB on the basis of benefit payments to the railroad's employees.

== Organization and functions ==
The Railroad Retirement Board is headed by three members appointed by the President of the United States, with the advice and consent of the Senate. One member is appointed upon the recommendation of railroad employers, one is appointed upon the recommendation of railroad labor organizations and the third, who is the chairman, is appointed to represent the public interest. The board members' terms of office are five years and are scheduled to expire in different years. However, they may continue to serve after the expiration of their term, until their successor takes office. A majority of the members in office constitutes a quorum.

The primary function of the RRB is the determination and payment of benefits under the retirement-survivor and unemployment-sickness programs. To this end, the RRB employs field representatives to assist railroad personnel and their families in filing claims for benefits, examiners to adjudicate the claims, and information technology staff, equipment and programs to maintain earnings records, calculate benefits and process payments.

The RRB also employs actuaries to predict the future income and outlays of the railroad retirement system, statisticians and economists to provide vital data, and attorneys to interpret legislation and represent the RRB in litigation. The President also appoints an Inspector General for the RRB, with the advice and consent of the Senate. The Inspector General employs auditors and investigators to detect any waste, fraud, or abuse in the benefit programs.

=== Current board members ===
The current board members as of May 24, 2026:

Position	Name	Group	Assumed office	Term expiration
Chair	Erhard R. Chorlé	Public	February 6, 2019	August 28, 2022
Member	Johnathan Bragg	Labor	February 5, 2019	August 28, 2024
Member	Thomas R. Jayne	Management	February 4, 2019	August 28, 2023

== Long Island Rail Road disability controversy ==
In contrast to the single disability program offered by Social Security, Railroad Retirement offers two types of disability annuities. The Total Disability, or "Disability Freeze", is based on guidelines similar to Social Security Disability. The Occupational Disability only requires that applicants possess certain ailments which are deemed by law as an inability for them to safely perform their particular regular job.

Railroad employees applying for either disability annuity must end any compensated service within 90 days from the date of filing. Employees either quit their jobs, retire or exhaust sick benefits before applying for either disability. Because of this requirement and the work restrictions while receiving a disability annuity, most annuitants had worked for carriers that already awarded them private company pensions.

In 2008, more than 90 percent of Long Island Rail Road (LIRR) retirees were receiving occupational disability payments. A former LIRR pension department manager was arrested and charged with official misconduct for allegedly "taking money to help railroad employees find a doctor and fill out paperwork for federal disability payments". All charges of corruption and official misconduct were dismissed by New York Supreme Court Judge Kase on December 11, 2009, who stated the prosecution had misled the Grand Jury in the indictment. In October of that year, the Board voted to strengthen its oversight of disability pensions.

A report produced in September 2009 by the U. S. Government Accountability Office disclosed that five federal agencies which investigated and audited the disability awards found no evidence of fraud or wrongdoing by either the Railroad Retirement Board or the retirees who applied for those awards. Its investigation did state, however, that "a nearly 100-percent approval rate in a federal disability program is troubling, and could indicate lax internal controls in the Board's decision-making process, weaknesses in program design, or both." The report found no fraud or wrongdoing, but noted that in "prior work, we found that numerous claims with evidence from the same doctors can be an indicator of potential fraud or abuse"; unlike sister agency Metro-North Railroad, LIRR disability evidence was provided primarily by one of three doctors.

In March 2010, the New York Attorney General's Office announced that LIRR had agreed to appoint an independent examiner and implement other reforms to address abuses of the occupational disability benefits by its retirees and to help ensure that benefits are available only to those who truly are disabled.

An additional 11 federal arrests occurred on October 27, 2011, including two doctors and a former union official. In September 2012, four LIRR retirees pleaded guilty to fraud. In February 2014, physician Peter J. Lesniewski was charged for providing "fraudulent medical narratives in support of the disability applications of at least 230 LIRR employees."

== See also ==
- Title 20 of the Code of Federal Regulations
- Pensions
- Retirement plans
- Social insurance
- Railroad Retirement Board Building
