= List of United States Supreme Court cases, volume 453 =

This is a list of all United States Supreme Court cases from volume 453 of the United States Reports:

Case name	Citation	Date decided
Middlesex Cnty. Sewerage Auth. v. Nat'l Sea Clammers Ass'n	453 U.S. 1	1981
Schweiker v. Gray Panthers	453 U.S. 34	1981
Rostker v. Goldberg	453 U.S. 57	1981
Postal Service v. Council of Greenburgh Civic Ass'ns	453 U.S. 114	1981
Lehman v. Nakshian	453 U.S. 156	1981
Cal. Med. Ass'n v. Fed. Election Comm'n	453 U.S. 182	1981
McCarty v. McCarty	453 U.S. 210	1981
Newport v. Fact Concerts, Inc.	453 U.S. 247	1981
Haig v. Agee	453 U.S. 280	1981
NLRB v. Amax Coal Co.	453 U.S. 322	1981
California v. Prysock	453 U.S. 355	1981
CBS v. FCC	453 U.S. 367	1981
Robbins v. California	453 U.S. 420	1981
New York v. Belton	453 U.S. 454	1981
Gulf Offshore Co. v. Mobil Oil Corp.	453 U.S. 473	1981
Metromedia, Inc. v. City of San Diego	453 U.S. 490	1981
Ark. La. Gas Co. v. Hall	453 U.S. 571	1981
Commonwealth Edison Co. v. Montana	453 U.S. 609	1981
Dames & Moore v. Regan	453 U.S. 654	1981
South Park Indep. Sch. Dist. v. United States	453 U.S. 1301	1981
Metro. Cnty. Bd. of Ed. v. Kelley	453 U.S. 1306	1981
City of Los Angeles v. Lyons	453 U.S. 1308	1981
