= Freedom of movement under United States law =

Freedom of movement under United States law is governed primarily by the Privileges and Immunities Clause of the United States Constitution which states, "The Citizens of each State shall be entitled to all Privileges and Immunities of Citizens in the several States." Since the circuit court ruling in Corfield v. Coryell, 6 Fed. Cas. 546 (1823), freedom of movement has been judicially recognized as a fundamental Constitutional right. In Paul v. Virginia, 75 U.S. 168 (1869), the court defined freedom of movement as "right of free ingress into other States, and egress from them." However, the Supreme Court did not invest the federal government with the authority to protect freedom of movement. Under the "privileges and immunities" clause, this authority was given to the states, a position the court held consistently through the years in cases such as Ward v. Maryland, 79 U.S. 418 (1871), the Slaughter-House Cases, 83 U.S. 36 (1873) and United States v. Harris, 106 U.S. 629 (1883).

== Travel within the United States ==
=== Constitutional freedom ===
As early as the Articles of Confederation the Congress recognized freedom of movement (Article 4), though the right was thought to be so fundamental during the drafting of the Constitution as to not need explicit enumeration.

The U.S. Supreme Court in Crandall v. Nevada, 73 U.S. 35 (1868) declared that freedom of movement is a fundamental right and therefore a state cannot inhibit people from leaving the state by taxing them. In United States v. Wheeler, 254 U.S. 281 (1920), the Supreme Court reiterated its position that the Constitution did not grant the federal government the power to protect freedom of movement. However, Wheeler had a significant impact in other ways. For many years, the roots of the Constitution's "privileges and immunities" clause had only vaguely been determined. In 1823, the circuit court in Corfield had provided a list of the rights (some fundamental, some not) which the clause could cover. The Wheeler court dramatically changed this. It was the first to locate the right to travel in the Privileges and Immunities Clause, providing the right with a specific guarantee of constitutional protection. By reasoning that the clause derived from Article IV of the Articles of Confederation, the decision suggested a narrower set of rights than those enumerated in Corfield, but also more clearly defined those rights as absolutely fundamental. The Supreme Court began rejecting Wheeler's reasoning within a few years. Finally, in United States v. Guest, 383 U.S. 745 (1966), the Supreme Court overruled Chief Justice White's conclusion that the federal government could protect the right to travel only against state infringement.

The Supreme Court has specifically ruled that Crandall does not imply a right to use any particular mode of travel, such as driving an automobile. In Hendrick v. Maryland (1915), the appellant asked the court to void Maryland's motor vehicle statute as a violation of the freedom of movement. The court found "no solid foundation" for the appellant's argument and unanimously held that "in the absence of national legislation covering the subject, a state may rightfully prescribe uniform regulations necessary for public safety and order in respect to the operation upon its highways of all motor vehicles — those moving in interstate commerce as well as others."

The U.S. Supreme Court also dealt with the right to travel in the case of Saenz v. Roe, 526 U.S. 489 (1999). In that case, Justice John Paul Stevens, writing for the majority, held that the United States Constitution protected three separate aspects of the right to travel among the states:

(1) the right to enter one state and leave another (an inherent right with historical support from the Articles of Confederation),

(2) the right to be treated as a welcome visitor rather than a hostile stranger (protected by the "Privileges and Immunities" clause in Article IV, § 2), and

(3) (for those who become permanent residents of a state) the right to be treated equally to native-born citizens (this is protected by the 14th Amendment's Privileges or Immunities Clause; citing the majority opinion in the Slaughter-House Cases, Justice Stevens said, "the Privileges or Immunities Clause of the Fourteenth Amendment ... has always been common ground that this Clause protects the third component of the right to travel.").

=== Mann Act ===
The 1910 Mann Act (White-Slave Traffic Act) among other things banned the interstate transport of females for otherwise undefined "immoral purposes", which were taken to include consensual extramarital sex. This act was used, in addition to less controversial cases, to allow federal prosecution of unmarried couples who had for some reason come to the attention of the authorities; interracial couples (e.g. boxer Jack Johnson) and people with left-wing views (e.g. Charlie Chaplin) were prosecuted. The Act has since been amended to be gender-neutral and now applies only to sexual activity which is separately illegal (such as prostitution and sex with a minor).

=== Implications ===
The court's establishment of a strong constitutional right to freedom of movement has had far-reaching effects. For example, the Supreme Court overturned state prohibitions on welfare payments to individuals who had not resided within the jurisdiction for at least one year as an impermissible burden on the right to travel in Shapiro v. Thompson, 394 U.S. 618 (1969). The court also struck down one-year residency requirements for voting in state elections in Dunn v. Blumstein, 405 U.S. 330 (1972); one-year waiting periods before receiving state-provided medical care in Memorial Hospital v. Maricopa County, 415 U.S. 250 (1974); and civil service preferences for state veterans in Attorney Gen. of New York v. Soto-Lopez, 476 U.S. 898 (1986). However, it upheld higher fishing and hunting license fees for out-of-state residents in Baldwin v. Fish and Game Commission of Montana, 436 U.S. 371 (1978).

Current US Code addresses air travel specifically. In 49 U.S.C. § 40103, "Sovereignty and use of airspace", the Code specifies that "A citizen of the United States has a public right of transit through the navigable airspace."

A strong right to freedom of movement may yet have even farther-reaching implications. The Supreme Court has acknowledged that freedom of movement is closely related to freedom of association and to freedom of expression. Strong constitutional protection for the right to travel may have significant implications for state attempts to limit abortion rights, ban or refuse to recognize same-sex marriages, and enact anti-crime or consumer protection laws. It may even undermine current court-fashioned concepts of federalism.

=== Free speech zones ===
A related issue deals with free speech zones designated during political protests. Although such zones were in use by the 1960s and 1970 due to the Vietnam-era protests, they were not widely reported in the media. However, the controversy over their use resurfaced during the 2001-2009 Bush presidency. In essence, Free Speech Zones prevent a person from having complete mobility as a consequence of their exercising their right to speak freely. Courts have accepted time, place, and manner restrictions on free speech in the United States, but such restrictions must be narrowly tailored, and free speech zones have been the subject of lawsuits.

== International travel ==
=== History ===
From 1776 to 1783, no state government had a passport requirement. The Articles of Confederation government (1783–1789) did not have a passport requirement. From 1789 through late 1941, the government established under the Constitution required United States passports of citizens only during the American Civil War (1861–1865) and during and shortly after World War I (1914–1918). The passport requirement of the Civil War era lacked statutory authority. After the outbreak of World War I, passports were required by executive order, though there was no statutory authority for the requirement. The Travel Control Act of May 22, 1918, permitted the president, when the United States was at war, to proclaim a passport requirement, and a proclamation was issued on August 18, 1918. Though World War I ended on November 11, 1918, the passport requirement lingered until March 3, 1921. There was an absence of a passport requirement under United States law between 1921 and 1941. World War II (1939–1945) again led to passport requirements under the Travel Control Act of 1918. A 1978 amendment to the Immigration and Nationality Act of 1952 made it illegal to enter or depart the United States without an issued passport even in peacetime. Note that the amendment does permit the President to make exceptions; historically, these exceptions have been used to permit travel to certain countries (particularly Canada) without a passport. As of August 10, 2016, tourism sites still discuss which alternative documents are acceptable, and which ceased to be sufficient in 2007 or 2008.

=== Restrictions ===
As per § 215 of the Immigration and Nationality Act of 1952 (currently codified at 8 U.S.C. § 1185), a United States citizen must enter or exit the United States on a valid United States passport.

As per Haig v. Agee and the Passport Act of 1926 (currently codified at 22 U.S.C. § 211a et seq.), the presidential administration may deny or revoke passports for foreign policy or national security reasons at any time. The Secretary of State has historically in times of peace refused passports for one of three reasons: citizenship or loyalty, criminal conduct, or when the applicant was seeking to "escape the toils of law". Laws and regulations on restricting passports have generally been categorized as personal restrictions or area restrictions and have generally been justified for national security or foreign policy reasons. Perhaps the most notable example of enforcement of this ability was the 1948 denial of a passport to U.S. Representative Leo Isacson, who sought to go to Paris to attend a conference as an observer for the American Council for a Democratic Greece, a communist front organization, because of the group's role in opposing the Greek government in the Greek Civil War.

In Kent v. Dulles, 357 U.S. 116 (1958), the United States Secretary of State had refused to issue a passport to an American citizen based on the suspicion that the plaintiff was going abroad to promote communism. Although the court did not reach the question of constitutionality in this case, the court, in an opinion by Justice William O. Douglas, held that the federal government may not restrict the right to travel without due process:

The right to travel is a part of the 'liberty' of which the citizen cannot be deprived without due process of law under the Fifth Amendment. If that "liberty" is to be regulated, it must be pursuant to the law-making functions of the Congress. ... Freedom of movement across frontiers in either direction, and inside frontiers as well, was a part of our heritage. Travel abroad, like travel within the country, ... may be as close to the heart of the individual as the choice of what he eats, or wears, or reads. Freedom of movement is basic in our scheme of values.

Six years later, the court struck down a federal ban restricting travel by communists in Aptheker v. Secretary of State, 378 U.S. 500 (1964). But the court struggled to find a way to protect national interests (such as national security) in light of these decisions. Just a year after Aptheker, the Supreme Court fashioned the rational basis test for constitutionality in Zemel v. Rusk, 381 U.S. 1 (1965) as a way of reconciling the rights of the individual with the interests of the state.

=== Restrictions as punishment ===
The Personal Responsibility and Work Opportunity Reconciliation Act of 1996 (PRWORA), codified at 42 USC 652(k), saw the beginning of restrictions on freedom of movement as a punishment for child support debtors. Constitutional challenges to these restrictions have thus far failed in Weinstein v. Albright and Eunique v. Powell. Federal appeals courts in the Second and Ninth circuits, although expressing due process concerns, have held that collection of child support is an important government interest, that the right to travel internationally was not a fundamental right and that laws restricting this right need not pass strict scrutiny. In a dissenting opinion in Eunique, Judge Andrew Kleinfeld categorized the measure as a punishment for unpaid debts. "This passport ban is more reasonably seen, in light of the penalties the states are required to impose for nonpayment of child support ... not as a means of facilitating collection, but as a penalty for past nonpayment." "All debtors should pay their debts. Debts for child support have special moral force. But that does not justify tossing away a constitutional liberty so important that it has been a constant of Anglo-American law since Magna Carta, and of civilized thought since Plato."

A number of constitutional scholars and advocates for reform strongly oppose restricting the human right to travel for a person who has committed no crime, and assert that the practice violates basic constitutional rights. Similarly, anyone claimed to be in arrears on child support can have certain types of vehicular driver's license revoked or suspended, severely restricting their freedom to travel. Critics point to cases where the lapse in support payments was caused by loss of employment yet the response of revoking the right to freely travel by car further impedes the ability to resume payments by limiting the ability to find employment and travel to a workplace.

== International Bill of Human Rights ==
The International Bill of Human Rights is an informal name given to the Universal Declaration of Human Rights (adopted in 1948), the International Covenant on Civil and Political Rights (1966) with its two Optional Protocols, and the International Covenant on Economic, Social and Cultural Rights (1966).

Article 13 of the Universal Declaration of Human Rights reads:

(1) Everyone has the right to freedom of movement and residence within the borders of each State.
(2) Everyone has the right to leave any country, including his own, and to return to his country.

Article 12 of the International Covenant on Civil and Political Rights incorporates this right into treaty law:

(1) Everyone lawfully within the territory of a State shall, within that territory, have the right to liberty of movement and freedom to choose his residence.
(2) Everyone shall be free to leave any country, including his own.
(3) The above-mentioned rights shall not be subject to any restrictions except those provided by law, are necessary to protect national security, public order (ordre publique), public health or morals or the rights and freedoms of others, and are consistent with the other rights recognized in the present Covenant.
(4) No one shall be arbitrarily deprived of the right to enter his own country.

== See also ==
- United States labor law
- Universal Declaration of Human Rights
- European Union law
