= Privileges and Immunities Clause =

Part of Article IV of the US Constitution

The Privileges and Immunities Clause (U.S. Constitution, Article IV, Section 2, Clause 1, also known as the Comity Clause) prevents a state of the United States from treating citizens of other states in a discriminatory manner. Additionally, a right of interstate travel is associated with the clause.

== Text ==
The Citizens of each State shall be entitled to all Privileges and Immunities of Citizens in the several States.

Hand-written copy of the Privileges and Immunities Clause from 1787

== Prior to ratification of Constitution ==
The clause is similar to a provision in the Articles of Confederation: "The free inhabitants of each of these States, paupers, vagabonds and fugitives from justice excepted, shall be entitled to all privileges and immunities of free citizens in the several States."

James Madison discussed that provision of the Articles of Confederation in Federalist No. 42. Madison wrote, "Those who come under the denomination of free inhabitants of a State, although not citizens of such State, are entitled, in every other State, to all the privileges of free citizens of the latter; that is, to greater privileges than they may be entitled to in their own State." Madison apparently did not believe that this clause in the Articles of Confederation dictated how a state must treat its own citizens. Alexander Hamilton wrote in Federalist No. 80 that the corresponding Privileges and Immunities Clause in the proposed federal Constitution was "the basis of the union."

== Between ratification and the Civil War ==
In the federal circuit court case of Corfield v. Coryell, Justice Bushrod Washington wrote in 1823 that the protections provided by the clause are confined to privileges and immunities which are, "in their nature, fundamental; which belong, of right, to the citizens of all free governments; and which have, at all times, been enjoyed by the citizens of the several states which compose this Union, from the time of their becoming free, independent, and sovereign."

In his explanation of the scope of the rights protected by the clause, Justice Washington included the right to travel through and reside in states, the right to claim benefit of the writ of habeas corpus, the right of access to the courts, the right to purchase and hold property, and an exemption from higher taxes than state residents pay. The Corfield case involved the rights of an out-of-state citizen, rather than the rights of an in-state citizen, and Justice Washington's opinion did not suggest that this provision of the Constitution addresses how a legislature must treat its own citizens. On the contrary, Washington's handwritten notes indicate his belief that this provision of the Constitution did not address how a legislature must treat its own citizens.

Another pertinent federal circuit court case was decided by Justice Henry Baldwin, who succeeded Justice Washington. In the case of Magill v. Brown, Justice Baldwin addressed the Privileges and Immunities Clause: "We must take it therefore as a grant by the people of the state in convention, to the citizens of all the other states of the Union, of the privileges and immunities of the citizens of this state."

These federal circuit court statements by Justices Washington and Baldwin were not inconsistent with each other. They both became the settled doctrine of the U.S. Supreme Court after the Civil War.

In 1833, Justice Joseph Story also addressed the clause:

It is obvious, that, if the citizens of each state were to be deemed aliens to each other, they could not take, or hold real estate, or other privileges, except as other aliens. The intention of this clause was to confer on them, if one may so say, a general citizenship; and to communicate all the privileges and immunities, which the citizens of the same state would be entitled to under the like circumstances.

Thus, Story thought that the clause was meant "only to provide temporary visitors with equality in certain rights with the citizens of the states they were visiting."

The clause was also mentioned by the Supreme Court in the infamous Dred Scott v. Sandford decision in 1857. Chief Justice Taney, speaking for the majority, said that the clause gives state citizens, when in other states, the right to travel, the right to sojourn, the right to free speech, the right to assemble, and the right to keep and bear arms. In his dissent, Justice Curtis wrote that the clause does not confer any rights other than rights that a visited state chooses to guarantee to its own citizens.

== After the Civil War ==
In 1866, during the congressional debates about the draft Fourteenth Amendment to the United States Constitution, Senator Jacob Howard noted that the U.S. Supreme Court had never squarely addressed the meaning of the Privileges and Immunities Clause:

It would be a curious question to solve what are the privileges and immunities of citizens of each of the States in the several States....I am not aware that the Supreme Court have ever undertaken to define either the nature or extent of the privileges and immunities thus guarantied.

The Fourteenth Amendment was ratified two years later, in 1868, and still the Supreme Court had not spoken. The following year, on November 1 of 1869, the Court finally addressed this issue. In the case of Paul v. Virginia, 75 U.S. 168 (1868), the Court said the following:

It was undoubtedly the object of the clause in question to place the citizens of each State upon the same footing with citizens of other States, so far as the advantages resulting from citizenship in those States are concerned. It relieves them from the disabilities of alienage in other States; it inhibits discriminating legislation against them by other States; it gives them the right of free ingress into other States, and egress from them; it insures to them in other States the same freedom possessed by the citizens of those States in the acquisition and enjoyment of property and in the pursuit of happiness; and it secures to them in other States the equal protection of their laws.

The Court went on to explain that the laws of one state would not become effective in another: "It was not intended by the provision to give to the laws of one State any operation in other States. They can have no such operation, except by the permission, express or implied, of those States." These sections of Paul v. Virginia are still good law, and were relied upon, for example, in Saenz v. Roe, 526 U.S. 489 (1999). Other portions of Paul v. Virginia were reversed in U.S. v. South-Eastern Underwriters Ass'n, 322 U.S. 533 (1944). The Court has never deviated from the principle stated in Paul that the Privileges and Immunities Clause in Article IV of the Constitution has no bearing on how a state treats its own citizens. In-state residents "have no claim under the Privileges and Immunities Clause." United Building & Construction Trades Council v. Mayor and Council of Camden, 465 U.S. 208 (1984).

The Privileges and Immunities Clause prevents discrimination against people from out of state, but only with regard to basic rights. The Court uses a two-part test to determine if the Privileges and Immunities Clause has been violated. First, it looks to see if a law discriminates against people from out of state regarding fundamental rights (e.g. protection by the government of the enjoyment of life, and liberty, the right to acquire and possess property of every kind, and to pursue and obtain happiness and safety). These rights often focus on the economic right to pursue a livelihood. The second part of the test focuses on whether the state is justified in the discrimination. It examines if there is a substantial reason for the difference in treatment, and if the discriminatory law has a substantial relationship to that reason. For example, the Court has asked: "Does the distinction made by Montana between residents and nonresidents in establishing access to elk hunting threaten a basic right in a way that offends the Privileges and Immunities Clause?" See Baldwin v. Fish and Game Commission of Montana 436 U.S. 371 (1978). The court held it did not, because hunting is a recreational sport, which is outside the fundamental rights protected by the Constitution. If the court had found that recreation and sports were fundamental rights, it would have still had to examine whether the state had a compelling interest (protecting elk herds from being over-hunted), and whether the law was designed to address that problem.

The Court's decision in the Slaughterhouse Cases (1873) is consistent with the idea that the Privileges and Immunities Clause was intended only to guarantee that a citizen of one state could enjoy equality in another state with regard to fundamental rights. Referring to the words of Justice Washington in Corfield, the Slaughterhouse Court stated:

[P]rivileges and immunities....are, in the language of Judge Washington, those rights which are fundamental. Throughout his opinion, they are spoken of as rights belonging to the individual as a citizen of a State....The constitutional provision there alluded to did not create those rights....It threw around them in that clause no security for the citizen of the State in which they were claimed or exercised. Nor did it profess to control the power of the State governments over the rights of its own citizens. Its sole purpose was to declare to the several States, that whatever those rights, as you grant or establish them to your own citizens, or as you limit or qualify, or impose restrictions on their exercise, the same, neither more nor less, shall be the measure of the rights of citizens of other States within your jurisdiction. (emphasis added)

The Supreme Court has never interpreted the Privileges and Immunities Clause as requiring any state to protect general rights of citizenship beyond those that the state already protects for its own citizens, though even a state's own citizens must be allowed to leave the state in order to enjoy privileges and immunities in any other state.

== Right to travel ==
The Privileges and Immunities Clause says that a citizen of one state is entitled to the privileges in another state, from which a right to travel to that other state may be inferred. Under this clause such an internal passport which is in use in a small minority of countries, would be unconstitutional. Indeed, in the 1982 case of Zobel v Williams, a majority of the U.S. Supreme Court agreed that the Privileges and Immunities Clause plausibly includes a right of interstate travel. In that case, Justice Sandra Day O'Connor explained:

Article IV's Privileges and Immunities Clause has enjoyed a long association with the rights to travel and migrate interstate. The Clause derives from Art. IV of the Articles of Confederation. The latter expressly recognized a right of "free ingress and regress to and from any other State," in addition to guaranteeing "the free inhabitants of each of these states . . . [the] privileges and immunities of free citizens in the several States." While the Framers of our Constitution omitted the reference to "free ingress and regress," they retained the general guaranty of "privileges and immunities." Charles Pinckney, who drafted the current version of Art. IV, told the Convention that this Article was "formed exactly upon the principles of the 4th article of the present Confederation." Commentators, therefore, have assumed that the Framers omitted the express guaranty merely because it was redundant, not because they wished to excise the right from the Constitution. Early opinions by the Justices of this Court also traced a right to travel or migrate interstate to Art. IV's Privileges and Immunities Clause....Similarly, in Paul v. Virginia, the Court found that one of the "undoubt[ed]" effects of the Clause was to give "the citizens of each State . . . the right of free ingress into other States, and egress from them....

Despite scholarly and judicial opinions acknowledging that the Privileges and Immunities Clause may include a right to travel, the issue is not without controversy.

== Miscellaneous ==
Unlike the Dormant Commerce Clause, there is no market participant exception to the Privileges and Immunities Clause. That means that even when a state is acting as a producer or supplier for a marketable good or service, the Privileges and Immunities Clause may prevent it from discriminating against non-residents.

Puerto Ricans were granted U.S. citizenship by the Jones–Shafroth Act in 1917; subsequently, the U.S. Congress passed a law (signed by President Truman in 1947) which expressly extended this constitutional clause to the U.S. citizens in the jurisdiction of Puerto Rico:

The rights, privileges, and immunities of citizens of the United States shall be respected in Puerto Rico to the same extent as though Puerto Rico were a State of the Union and subject to the provisions of paragraph 1 of section 2 of article IV of the Constitution of the United States.

In the 1970s the Supreme Court began to recognize the application to Puerto Rico of several Constitutional protections contained in the Bill of Rights. In its opinions, the Court, without elaborating, relied on the Insular Cases of Downes and Balzac as precedent for the application of these constitutional rights.

== Bibliography ==
- Farber, Daniel A.; Eskridge, William N. Jr.; Frickey, Philip P. Constitutional Law: Themes for the Constitution's Third Century. Thomson-West Publishing, 2003. ISBN 0-314-14353-X
- Hall, Kermit L. ed. The Oxford Companion to the Supreme Court of the United States, Second Edition. Oxford University Press, 2005. ISBN 0-19-511883-9
- Rich, William J. "Why 'Privileges or Immunities'? An Explanation of the Framers' Intent," Akron Law Review, 42 (no. 4, 2009), 1111–27.

== See also ==
- Privileges or Immunities Clause
- Baldwin v. Fish and Game Commission of Montana
- New York v. O'Neill
- Sohappy v. Smith
