= Freedom of movement =

Right of people to travel within and outside their own country

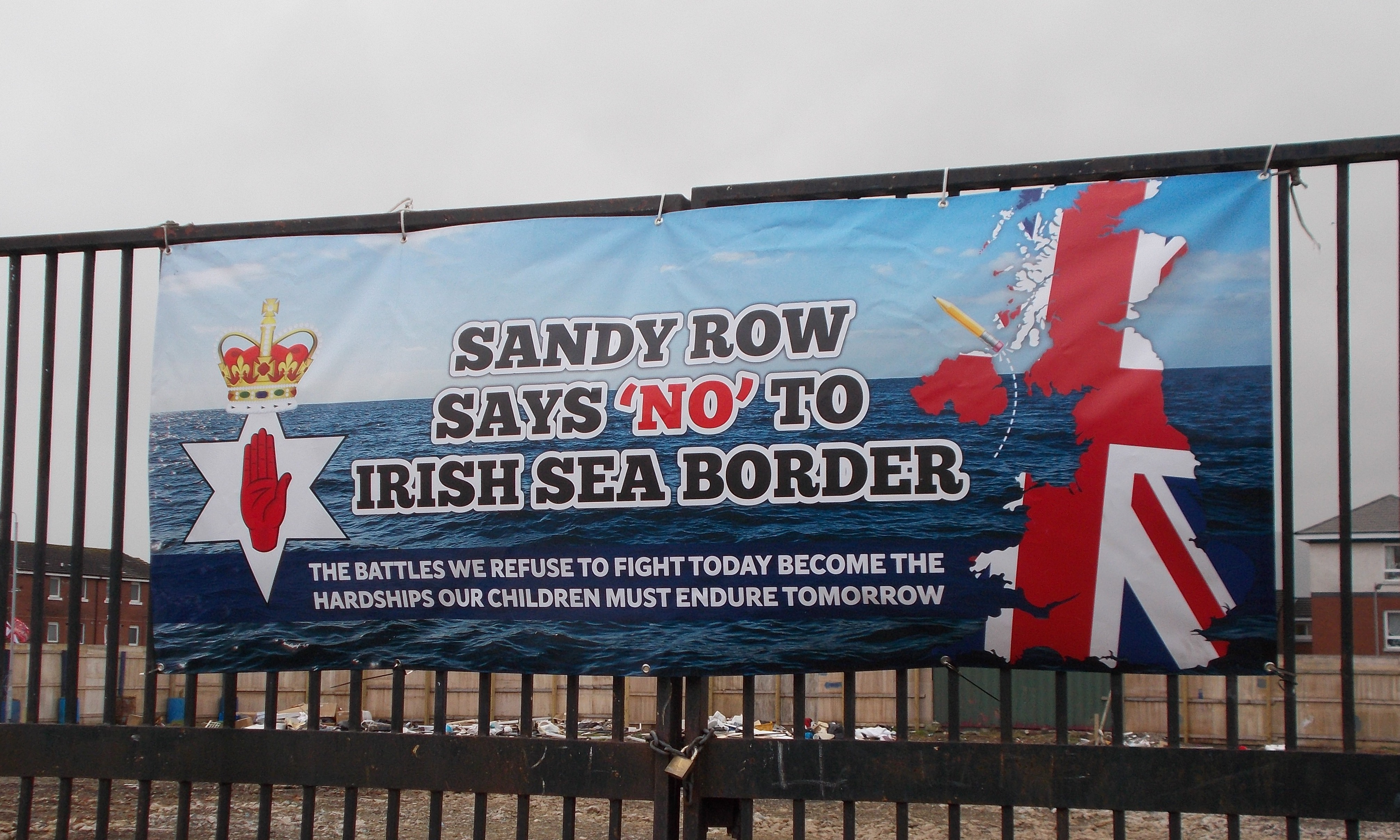
Banner displayed in Sandy Row (March 2021)

Freedom of movement, mobility rights, or the right to travel is a human rights concept encompassing the right of individuals to travel from place to place within the territory of a country, and to leave the country and return to it. The right includes not only visiting places, but changing the place where the individual resides or works.

Such a right is provided in the constitutions of numerous states, and in documents reflecting norms of international law. For example, Article 13 of the Universal Declaration of Human Rights asserts that:

- "Everyone has the right to freedom of movement and residence within the borders of each state."
- "Everyone has the right to leave any country, including his own, and to return to his country."

Some people and organizations advocate an extension of the freedom of movement to include free migration between countries. The freedom of movement is restricted in a variety of ways by various governments and may even vary within the territory of a single country. Such restrictions are generally based on public health, order, or safety justifications and postulate that the right to these conditions preempts the notion of freedom of movement.

== Common restrictions ==
Restrictions on international travel on people (immigration or emigration) are commonplace. Within countries, freedom of travel is often more limited for minors, and penal law can modify this right as it applies to persons charged with or convicted of crimes (for example, parole, probation, registration). In some countries, freedom of movement has historically been limited for women, and for members of disfavored racial and social groups. States may depart from their usual stance on this issue for legal, political, humanitarian, and/or other reasons. For example, a nation that is generally permissive with respect to entrance by its non-nationals, ingress by its nationals, and/or internal travel by persons already present may perceive a need to restrict one or more of those rights during time of war, or a nation with stringent immigration policies may permit the temporary or indefinite admission of persons displaced from a conflict zone in a neighboring country.

National and/or regional economic policies exerting a "chilling effect" on or otherwise deterring the international and/or intra-national movement of persons may include the following:

- Nationally and/or regionally legislated minimum-wage barriers (i.e., "price floors" for units of labor time): When an authority sets a minimum wage for a jurisdiction, it prevents employers in that jurisdiction from profitably hiring would-be workers (whether foreign or domestic) whose maximum productivity per unit time under local conditions is less than the local minimum wage. It thereby excludes those workers from participation in the jurisdiction's labor market and removes the associated incentive for workers living in lower-wage areas to move or otherwise travel to the jurisdiction.
- Requirements that a jurisdiction's residents carry official documents (internal passports, national identity cards, etc.) and produce them on domestic authorities' demand:

- These requirements frequently underpin a jurisdiction-wide checkpoint and tracking system that deters intra-national travel, including work-related intra-national travel, by members of groups frequently selected by authorities for abuse or harassment.

- In addition, requiring possession and display of these documents prevents such travel from being performed legally by persons – whether foreigners in a jurisdiction or, if the jurisdiction enforces the requirement uniformly, even the jurisdiction's nationals – who are unable to afford the fees for such documents, to whom the jurisdiction wrongly refuses issuance of those documents, or to whom a governmental or non-governmental entity has denied physical access to or possession of those documents.

- A requirement that a prospective or new employee possess and present such documents operates as a hiring-phase analogue to the effects on travel described above.

- Local/regional barriers to housebuilding and therefore settlement in particular districts (e.g., "smart growth" policies): By reducing the supply of new housing in a jurisdiction, such policies inflate the price of both newly- and already-constructed housing and thereby shrink the set of persons financially able to immigrate.
- Motor-vehicle road and highway design featuring little or no pedestrian and/or bicycle access: In the design and development of transportation infrastructure, an exclusive or excessive focus on motor-vehicle travel disproportionally facilitates employment-related (and other) travel by persons who can afford to obtain a motor vehicle and who are able to operate it or hire a driver. Some motor-vehicle infrastructure designs actively impede pedestrian and bicycle travel by physically blocking it or routing it to overlap with moderate- to high-speed motor-vehicle traffic in a manner increasing the frequency and average severity of collisions.

=== Freedom of movement between private properties ===
In some jurisdictions, questions have arisen as to the extent to which a private owner of land can exclude certain persons from land which is used for public purposes, such as a shopping mall or a park. There is also a rule of law that a landowner whose property has no public access can be awarded an easement to cross private land if necessary to reach his own property. Conversely, public nuisance laws prevent alternate use of public streets designated for public transit from being used for block parties and playing basketball.

Parents or other legal guardians are typically able to restrict the movements of minor children under their care, and of other adults who have been legally deemed incompetent to govern their own movement. Employers may legally set some restrictions on the movements of employees, and terminate employment if those restrictions are breached.

=== Domestic restrictions ===
Governments may generally sharply restrict the freedom of movement of persons who have been convicted of crimes, most conspicuously in the context of imprisonment. Restrictions may also be placed on convicted criminals who are on probation or have been released on parole. Persons who have been charged with crimes and have been released on bail may also be prohibited from traveling. A material witness may also be denied the right to travel.

Though travelling to and from countries is generally permitted (with some limitations), most governments restrict the length of time that temporary visitors may stay in the country. This can be dependent on country of citizenship and country travelled to among other factors. In some instances (such as those of refugees who are at risk of immediate bodily harm on return to their country or those seeking asylum), indefinite stay may be allowed on humanitarian grounds, but in most other cases, stay is generally limited. One notable exception to this is the free movement of people in the European Union, where citizens of any country in the EU and EFTA generally enjoy indefinite stay in other EU/EFTA countries.

Furthermore, restrictions on the right to relocate or live in certain areas of a country have been imposed in several countries, most prominently China.

In a child custody dispute, a court may place restrictions on the movement of a minor child, thereby restricting the ability of the parents of that child to travel with their child.

=== Entrance restrictions in certain countries ===
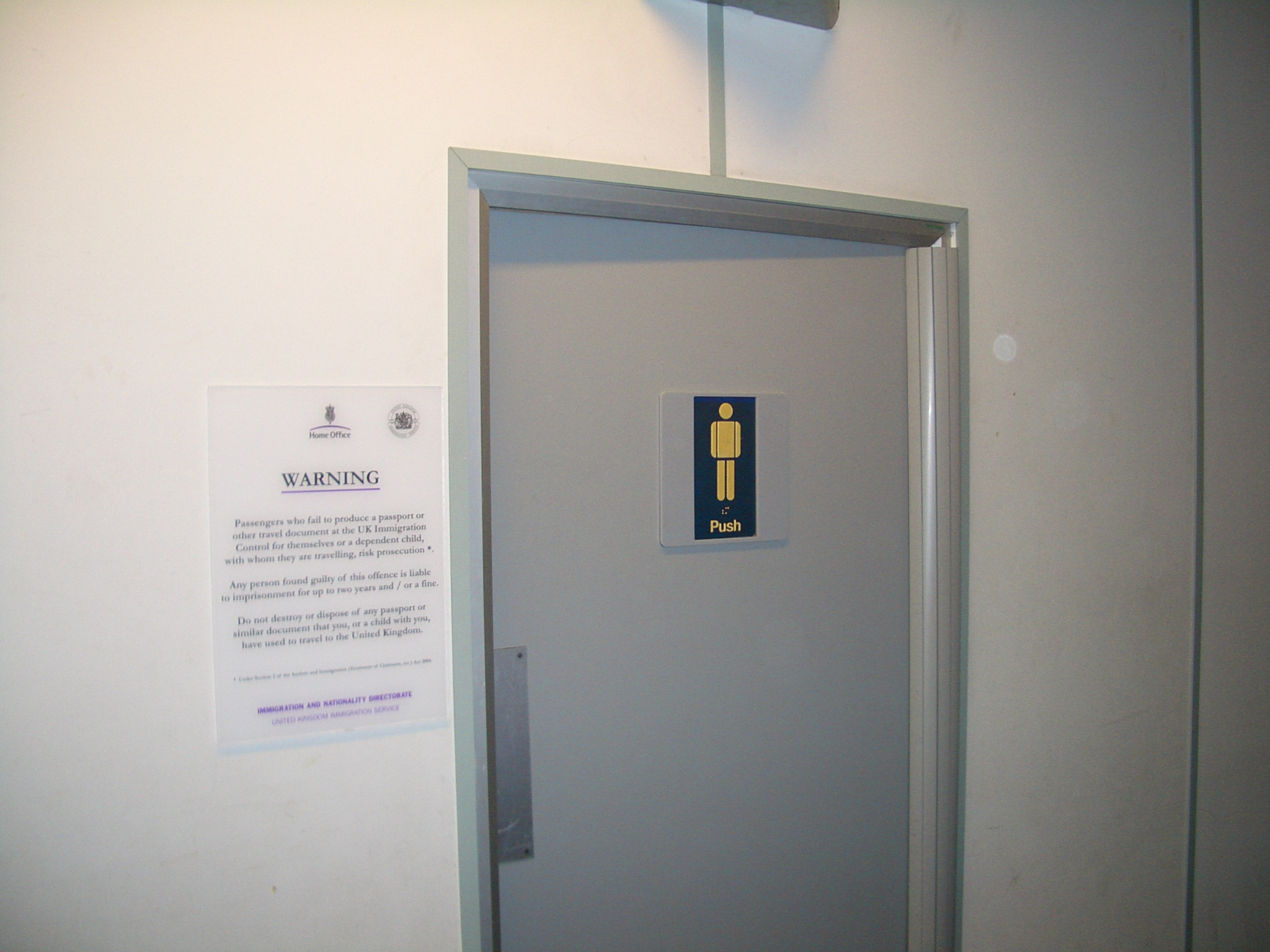
The British Government instructs travellers arriving at London Stansted Airport not to destroy their travel documents, in order to be able to adjudicate their eligibility to enter the country

The Visa Restrictions Index ranks countries based on the number of other countries its citizens are free to enter without visa. Most countries in the world require visas or some other form of entrance permit for non-citizens to enter their territory. Those who enter countries in defiance of regulations requiring such documentation are often subject to imprisonment or deportation.

=== Exit restrictions in certain countries ===
Most countries require that their citizens leave the country on a valid passport, travel document issued by an international organization or, in some cases, identification document. Conditions of issuance and the governments' authority to deny issuance of a passport vary from country to country.

Under certain circumstances, countries may issue travel documents (such as laissez-passer) to aliens, that is, to persons other than their own citizens.

Having a passport issued does not guarantee the right to exit the country. A person may be prohibited to exit a country on a number of reasons, such as being under investigation as a suspect, serving a criminal sentence, being a debtor in default, or posing a threat to national security. This applies to aliens as well.

In some countries prohibition to leave may take the form of revocation of a previously issued passport. For example, the United States of America may revoke passports at will.

Some countries, such as the former Soviet Union, further required that their citizens, and sometimes foreign travelers, obtain an exit visa to be allowed to leave the country.

Currently, some countries require that foreign citizens have valid visas upon leaving the country if they needed one to enter. For example, a person who overstayed a visa in Czech Republic may need to obtain an exit visa. In Russia, the inconvenience goes even further as the legislation there does not formally recognize residency permits as valid visas; thus, foreign citizens lawfully residing in Russia need to obtain "exit-entry" visas in order to do a trip abroad. This, in particular, affects foreign students, whose original entry visas expire by the time they return home.

Citizens of the People's Republic of China who are residents of the mainland are required to apply for exit and entry endorsements in order to enter the special administrative regions of Hong Kong and Macau (and SAR residents require a Home Return Permit to visit the mainland). Since 2016, residents of the Xinjiang Uyghur Autonomous Region have been required to deposit their passports with the police. Each trip abroad must be approved by the government, which is more difficult for members of the Uyghur ethnic group.

Saudi Arabia and Qatar require all resident foreigners, but not citizens, to obtain an exit visa before leaving the country.

== History ==
=== Europe ===
When Augustus established the Roman Empire in 27 BC, he assumed monarchical powers over the new Roman province of Egypt and was able to prohibit senators from traveling there without his permission. However, Augustus would also allow more liberty to travel at times. During a famine in 6 AD, he attempted to relieve strain on the food supply by granting senators the liberty to leave Rome and to travel to wherever they wished.

In England, in 1215, the right to travel was enshrined in Article 42 of the Magna Carta:

It shall be lawful to any person, for the future, to go out of our kingdom, and to return, safely and securely, by land or by water, saving his allegiance to us, unless it be in time of war, for some short space, for the common good of the kingdom: excepting prisoners and outlaws, according to the laws of the land, and of the people of the nation at war against us, and Merchants who shall be treated as it is said above.

In the Holy Roman Empire, a measure instituted by Joseph II in 1781 permitted serfs freedom of movement.

The serfs of the Russian Empire were not given their personal freedom until Alexander II's Edict of Emancipation of 1861. At the time, most of the inhabitants of Russia, not only the serfs but also townsmen and merchants, did not have freedom of movement and were confined to their places of residence.

=== United Nations Declaration ===
After the end of hostilities in World War II, the United Nations was established on 24 October 1945. The new international organization recognized the importance of freedom of movement through documents such as the Universal Declaration of Human Rights (1948) and the International Covenant on Civil and Political Rights (1966). Article 13 of the Universal Declaration of Human Rights, adopted by the U.N. General Assembly, reads,

The text of the Universal Declaration of Human Rights.

(1) Everyone has the right to freedom of movement and residence within the borders of each State.
(2) Everyone has the right to leave any country, including his own, and to return to his country.

Article 12 of the International Covenant on Civil and Political Rights incorporates this right into treaty law:

(1) Everyone lawfully within the territory of a State shall, within that territory, have the right to liberty of movement and freedom to choose his residence.
(2) Everyone shall be free to leave any country, including his own.
(3) The above-mentioned rights shall not be subject to any restrictions except those provided by law, are necessary to protect national security, public order, public health or morals or the rights and freedoms of others, and are consistent with the other rights recognized in the present Covenant.
(4) No one shall be arbitrarily deprived of the right to enter his own country.

The ICCPR entered into force for the initial ratifying states on 23 March 1976, and for additional states following their ratification. In 1999, the U.N. Human Rights Committee, which is charged with interpreting the treaty, issued its guidelines for Article 12 of the ICCPR in its "General Comment No. 27: Freedom of Movement".

While the treaty sets out the freedom of movement in broad and absolute terms, part four of Article 12 of the ICCPR admits that these freedoms may be restricted for a variety of reasons in the public interest. This clause is often cited to justify a wide variety of movement restrictions by almost every country that is party to it.

=== COVID-19 ===
During the COVID-19 pandemic, restrictions on freedom of movement were implemented by many of the world's governments.

== Examples of free movement arrangements between countries ==
=== Commonwealth of Independent States ===
The countries of the Commonwealth of Independent States have concluded a number of agreements among themselves in the field of citizens' mobility rights, which regulate visa-free travel, recognition of documents, cooperation in the field of employment and the common labor market. Usually a travel passport is required for abroad visits, unless there are other agreements that a national identity document or internal passport is valid (a common market is a lesser degree of integration than a single market and separate agreements are more restrictive than the provisions of a single market).

The Eurasian Economic Union overlaps with the Commonwealth of Independent States.

=== Eurasian Economic Union ===
The single market has provided for the free movement of labor without work permits for the worker and his or her family members since 2012, including access to health care and recognition of educational credentials. The national identity document or internal passport is valid within the Union (a single market is a deeper degree of integration than a common market).

The Commonwealth of Independent States overlaps with the Eurasian Economic Union.

=== European Union ===
European Union Freedom-of-Movement Area

Within the European Union, residents are guaranteed the right to freely move within the EU's internal borders by the Treaty on the Functioning of the European Union and the European Parliament and Council Directive 2004/38/EC of 29 April 2004. Union residents are given the right to enter any member state for up to three months with a valid passport or national identity card, and over three months with evidence of "sufficient resources... not to become a burden on the social assistance system". If the citizen does not have a travel document, the member state must afford them every facility in obtaining the documents. Under no circumstances can an entry or exit visa be required. There are some security limitations and public policy restrictions on extended stays by EU residents. For instance, a member state may require that persons register their presence in the country "within a reasonable and non-discriminatory period of time". In general, however, the burden of notification and justification lies with the state. EU citizens also earn a right to permanent residence in member states they have maintained an uninterrupted five-year period of legal residence. This residency cannot be subject to any conditions, and is lost only by two successive years absence from the host nation. Family members of EU residents, in general, also acquire the same freedom of travel rights as the resident they accompany, though they may be subject to a short-stay visa requirement. Furthermore, no EU citizen may be declared permanently persona non grata within the European Union, or permanently excluded from entry by any member state.

==== Workers ====
Freedom of movement for workers is a policy chapter of the acquis communautaire of the European Union. It is part of the free movement of persons and one of the four economic freedoms: free movement of goods, services, labour and capital. Article 45 TFEU (ex 39 and 48) states that:

1. Freedom of movement for workers shall be secured within the Community.
2. Such freedom of movement shall entail the abolition of any discrimination based on nationality between workers of the Member States as regards employment, remuneration and other conditions of work and employment.
3. It shall entail the right, subject to limitations justified on grounds of public policy, public security or public health:
  (a) to accept offers of employment actually made;
  (b) to move freely within the territory of Member States for this purpose;
  (c) to stay in a Member State for the purpose of employment in accordance with the provisions governing the employment of nationals of that State laid down by law, regulation or administrative action;
  (d) to remain in the territory of a Member State after having been employed in that State, subject to conditions which shall be embodied in implementing regulations to be drawn up by the Commission.
4. The provisions of this article shall not apply to employment in the public service.

=== Schengen Area ===
A different arrangement amongst 29 European countries, covers some but not all European Union member states together with some non-member states. The arrangement allows visa-free travel between the countries in this area, in general without border controls. A foreign national who holds a visa issued by any of these countries can travel freely within the area.

=== Nordic Passport Union ===
The Nordic Passport Union allows citizens of the Nordic countries – Iceland, Denmark, Norway, Sweden, and Finland – to travel and reside in another Nordic country without any travel documentation (e.g. a passport or national identity card) or a residence permit. Since 25 March 2001, all five states are also in the Schengen Area.

=== Mercosur ===
Member states Associated states Suspended member

The Mercosur alliance between Argentina, Bolivia, Brazil, Paraguay and Uruguay includes a freedom of movement area between its member states and five other associate states. Citizens don't require a passport to travel through other Mercosur or associate countries. Freedom of movement also extends to certain associated countries (Chile, Colombia, Ecuador and Peru), citizens of which can also travel to their territories without the need of a passport.

=== Central America ===
The Central America-4 Border Control Agreement, signed in 2006, abolished land border checks among El Salvador, Guatemala, Honduras, and Nicaragua. The countries have adopted a harmonized external border and visitor policy.

=== Australia and New Zealand ===
The Trans-Tasman Travel Arrangement covers movement of respective citizens of Australia and New Zealand between those countries.

The Trans-Tasman Travel Arrangement between Australia and New Zealand allows citizens of each country to move between, and work within, the two countries with few limitations. The arrangement also extends to holders of permanent resident and resident return visas of Australia.

=== United Kingdom, Ireland, Isle of Man and Channel Islands ===
Countries and territories of the Common Travel Area.

The Common Travel Area arrangements allow citizens of the United Kingdom and Ireland, and other British nationals resident in the Isle of Man and the Channel Islands, to travel freely in this area. The arrangements also extend to certain foreign nationals who hold visas issued by these countries.

=== Gulf Cooperation Council ===
Countries and territories of the Gulf Cooperation Council.

Saudi, Omani, Kuwaiti, Bahraini, Qatari, Emirati - Gulf Cooperation Council (GCC) citizens do not need a visa to enter each other's countries and they also have the right to work in each GCC country. GCC citizens can use a GCC national identity card (rather than a passport) to travel between these states.

=== Union State of Russia and Belarus ===
Freedom of movement between Russia and Belarus for their citizens exists, similar to that which exists for British and Irish citizens within the Common Travel Area.

=== India and Nepal ===
Indian and Nepalese citizens can live, work, own property and participate in trade and commerce in each other's country as per the 1950 India-Nepal Treaty of Peace and Friendship.

=== India and Bhutan ===
Indian and Bhutanese citizens can travel between the two countries with no passport.

=== United States, Federated States of Micronesia, Marshall Islands, and Palau ===
Citizens of the Federated States of Micronesia, Marshall Islands, Palau, and the United States may enter, reside, study, and work in each respective country indefinitely without a visa.

=== The Caribbean ===
==== Organisation of Eastern Caribbean States (OECS) ====
Citizens of certain countries in the Organisation of Eastern Caribbean States (Antigua and Barbuda, Dominica, Grenada, Montserrat, Saint Kitts and Nevis, Saint Lucia, and Saint Vincent and the Grenadines) may enter, reside, study, and work in each respective country indefinitely without a visa.

==== CARICOM ====
The Caribbean Community (CARICOM) member states of Barbados, Belize, Dominica, and Saint Vincent and the Grenadines have implemented full freedom of movements of their nationals among themselves since 01 October 2025. Nationals of these four countries have the unrestricted right to live and work in said countries, with no time limits or visas.

== Protection of right to freedom of movement in specific countries ==
=== Asia ===
==== Myanmar ====
The military regime in Myanmar has been criticized for allegations of restrictions to freedom of movement. These include restrictions on movement by political dissidents, women, and migrant workers.

==== China (mainland) ====
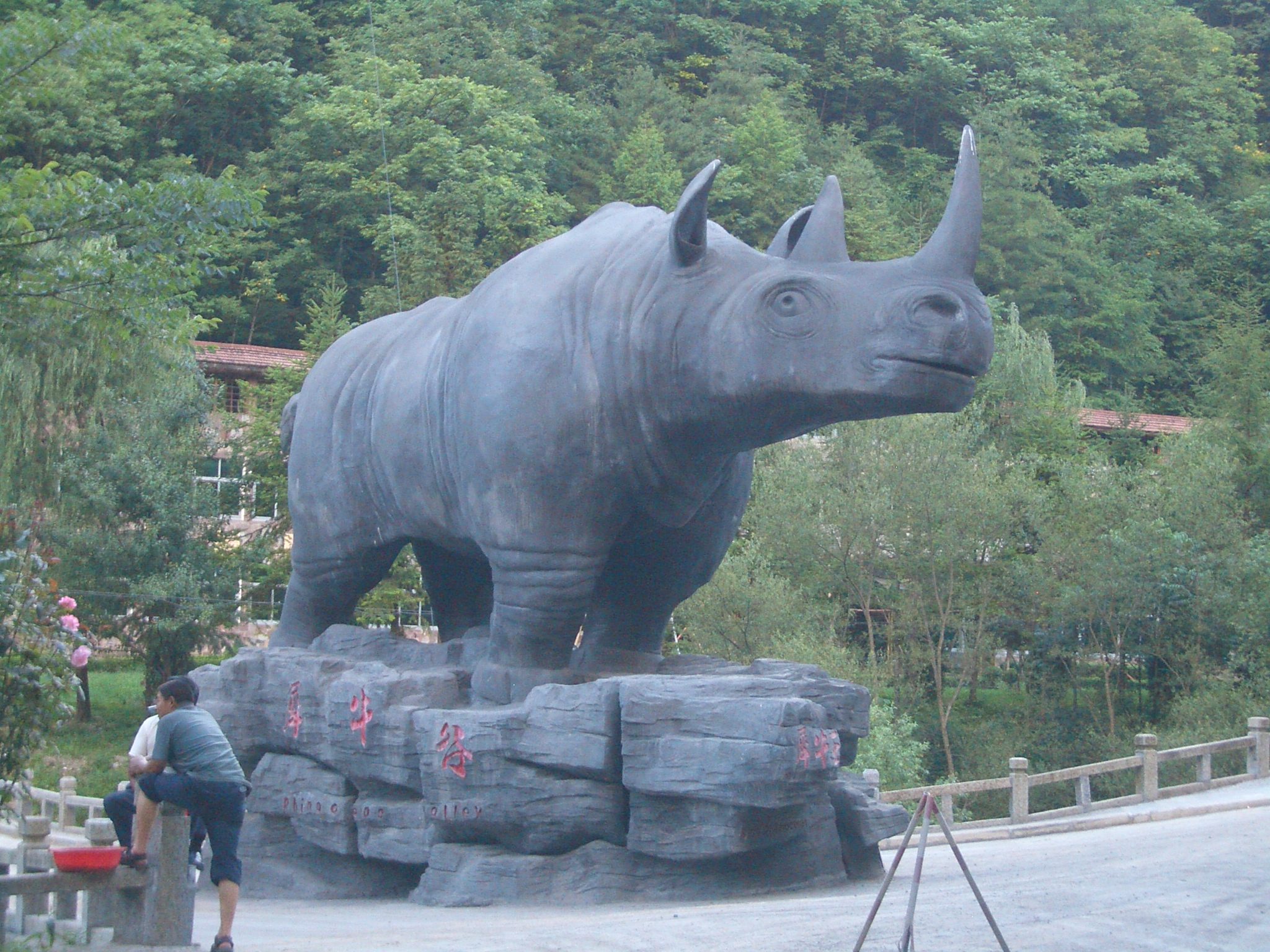
Hongping, Shennongjia District - within a section of Hubei province closed to foreign visitors

In the mainland of the People's Republic of China, the hukou system of household registration makes internal migration difficult, especially for rural residents to move to urban areas. Many people move to places in which they do not have a local hukou, but local governments can restrict services like subsidized schooling, subsidized housing, and health insurance to those with local hukou. The system was used as far back as the Han dynasty for tax collection, and more recently in the People's Republic to control urbanization. The Hukou system has also led many municipal governments to disregard the welfare of migrant workers as measures of wellbeing and economic progress are based almost exclusively on conditions for those with a local hukou.

Also, Chinese citizens are allowed to go from the mainland to Hong Kong or Macau only for travel, but not for residence unless they obtain the "one-way permit" from Chinese authorities. Currently, the issuance of the "one-way permit" is limited to 150 per day.

The Tibetan Centre for Human Rights and Democracy claimed in 2000 that people in Tibet had to promise not to criticize the Chinese Communist Party before receiving official permission to leave for India or Nepal. Additionally, it alleged that people of Han descent in Tibet have a far easier time acquiring the necessary permits to live in urban areas than ethnic Tibetans do.

==== Hong Kong and Macau ====
As a part of the one country, two systems policy proposed by Deng Xiaoping and accepted by the British and Portuguese governments, the special administrative regions (SARs) of Hong Kong and Macau retained separate border control and immigration policies with mainland China. Chinese nationals had to gain permission from the government before travelling to Hong Kong or Macau, but this requirement was officially abolished for each SAR after its respective handover. Since then, restrictions imposed by the SAR governments have been the limiting factor on travel.

Under Basic Law of Hong Kong article 31, "Hong Kong residents shall have freedom of movement within the Hong Kong Special Administrative Region and freedom of immigration to other countries and regions. They shall have freedom to travel and to enter or leave the Region. Unless restrained by law, holders of valid travel documents shall be free to leave the Region without special authorization."

==== India ====
- Freedom to move freely throughout the territory of India though reasonable restrictions can be imposed on this right in the interest of the general public, for example, restrictions may be imposed on movement and travelling, so as to control epidemics.
- Freedom to reside and settle in any part of the territory of India, which is subject to reasonable restrictions by the State in the interest of the general public, or for protection of the scheduled tribes because certain safeguards, as are envisaged here, seem justified to protect indigenous and tribal peoples from exploitation and coercion.

==== Israel ====
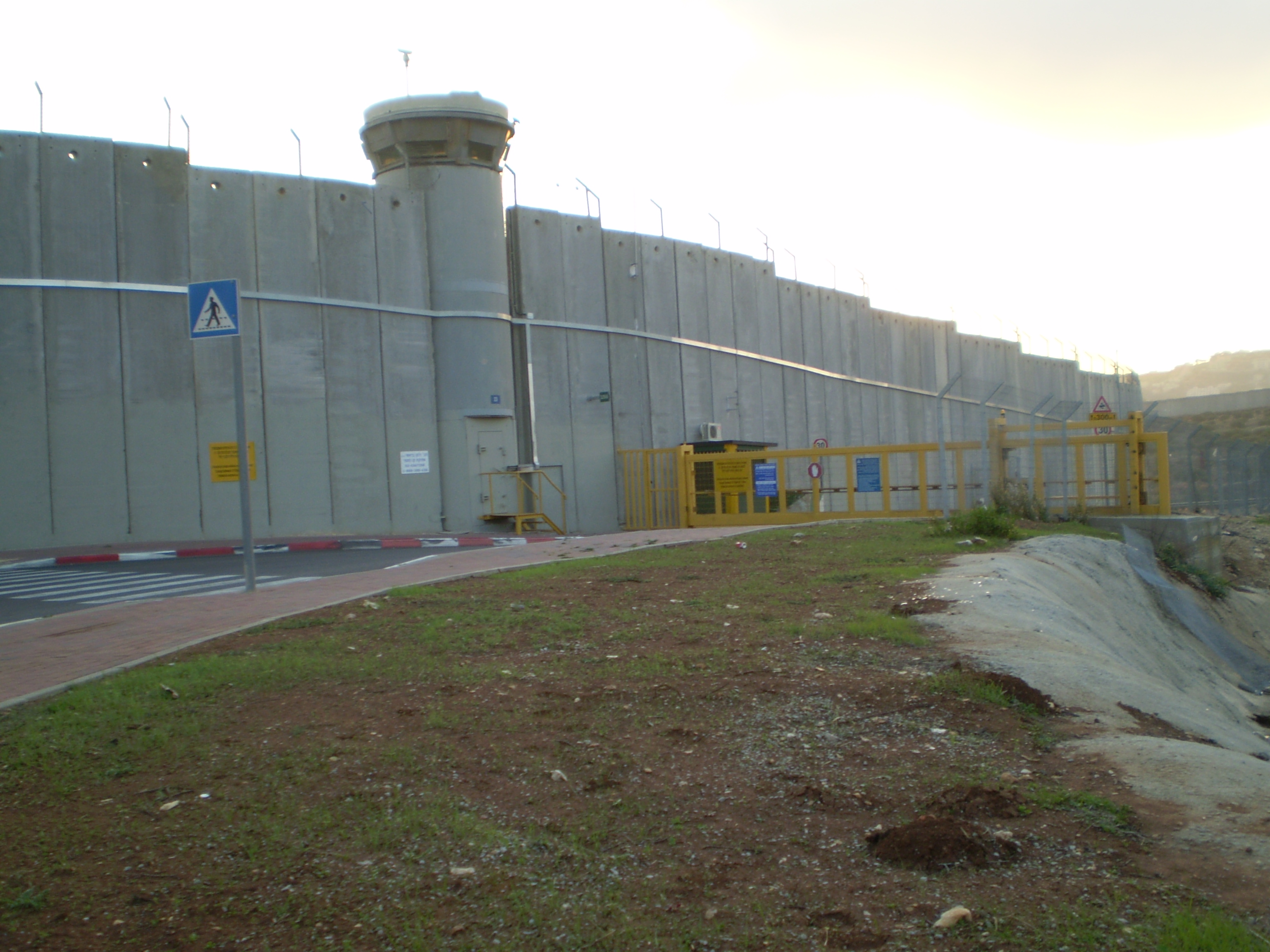
An internal Israeli checkpoint near the town of Bethlehem.

Israeli Basic Law: Human Dignity and Liberty, which has quasi-constitutional status, declares that "there shall be no deprivation or restriction of the liberty of a person by imprisonment, arrest, extradition or otherwise"; that "all persons are free to leave Israel"; and that "every Israeli national has the right of entry into Israel from abroad". In practice, stay of exit orders are liberally issued by Israel courts, including on non-custodial fathers who are not in arrears in child support. In March 2012 a corruption scandal led to the arrest of two officials for allegedly having taken bribes to circumvent court ordered "no exit" travel abroad bans. Freedoms of movement within the West Bank and Gaza is not similarly protected and has been a source of controversy.

==== Japan ====
The Constitution provides for the freedom of movement within the country, foreign travel, immigration, and repatriation, and the Government generally respects them in practice. Citizens have the right to travel freely both within the country and abroad, to change their place of residence, to emigrate, and to repatriate voluntarily. Citizenship may be forfeited by naturalization in a foreign country or by failure of persons born with dual nationality to elect citizenship at the required age. The law does not permit forced exile, and it is not used.

==== Kuwait ====
Kuwait refuses admission to holders of Israeli passports as part of its boycott against Israel. In 2015 Kuwait Airways cancelled its route between New York and London following a decision by the U.S. Department of Transportation that the airline had engaged in discrimination by refusing to sell tickets to Israeli citizens. Direct flights between the US and Kuwait are not affected by this decision as Israeli citizens are not allowed to enter Kuwait.

==== North Korea ====
Travel to North Korea is tightly controlled. The standard route to and from North Korea is by plane or train via Beijing. Transport directly to and from South Korea was possible on a limited scale from 2003 until 2008, when a road was opened (bus tours, no private cars). Freedom of Movement within North Korea is also limited, as citizens are not allowed to move around freely inside their country.

==== Syria ====
Syrian citizens are prohibited from exiting the country without special visas issued by government authorities.

The Syrian Constitution states "Every citizen has the right to liberty of movement within the territory of the State unless prohibited therefrom under the terms of a court order or public health and safety regulations.". In its mandated report on human rights to the United Nations, Syria has argued that because of this constitutional protection: "in Syria, no laws or measures restrict the liberty of movement or choice of residence of citizens". Legislative Decree No. 29 of 1970 regulates the right of foreigners to enter, reside in and leave the territory of Syria, and is the controlling document regarding the issuance of passports, visas, and diplomatic travel status. The document specifically states "The latter provision is intended merely to ensure that our country is not the final destination of stateless persons."

However, Syria has been criticized by groups, including Amnesty International for restrictions to freedom of movement. In August 2005, Amnesty International released an "appeal case", citing several freedom of movement restrictions including exit restriction without explanation, refusal to issue passports to political dissidents, detention, restriction from entering certain structures, denial of travel documents, and denial of nationality. The United Nations Human Rights Committee issues regular reports on human rights in Syria, including freedom of movement.

There are certain restrictions on movement placed on Women, for example Syrian law now allows males to place restrictions on certain female relatives. Women over the age of 18 are entitled to travel outside of Syria, however a woman's husband may file a request for his wife to be banned from leaving the country. From July 2013, in certain villages in Syria (such as Raqqa and Deir el-Zour), ISIS no longer allow women to appear in public alone, they must be accompanied by a male relative/guardian known as a mahram. People who tried to leave ISIS territory were routinely tortured and executed.

==== Palestine ====
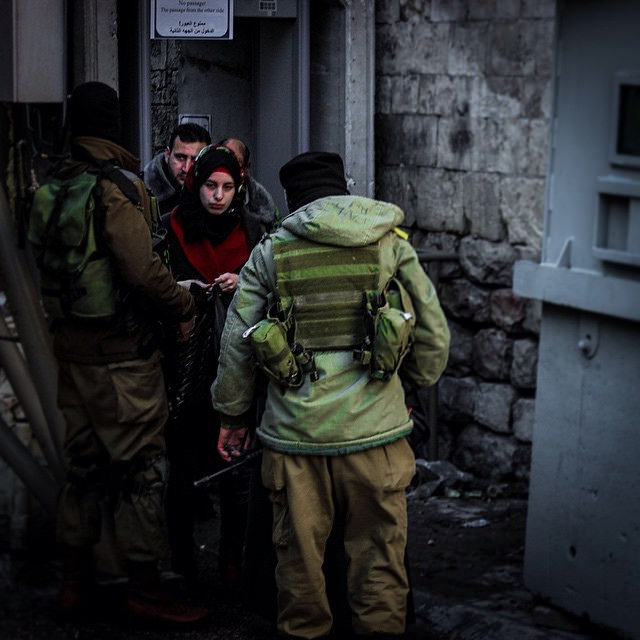
Palestinians queue to pass through a checkpoint between neighborhoods in the city of Hebron.

The restriction of the movement of Israelis and Palestinians in Israel and the West Bank by Israel and the Palestinian National Authority is an issue in the Israeli–Palestinian conflict. In the mid-1990s, with the implementation of the Oslo Accords and the division of the West Bank into three separate administrative divisions, Israeli freedom of movement was limited by law. Israel says that the regime of restrictions is necessary to protect Israelis both in Israel proper and in the West Bank.

Checkpoints exist throughout and at entrances and exits to the West Bank that limit the movement of non-Israelis on the basis of nationality, age, and sex among other criteria. While many such checkpoints are static, many are random, or move around frequently. Full closures of the West Bank to any entrance or exit are frequent, generally taking place on Jewish Holidays.

Residents of Gaza are only allowed to travel to the West Bank in exceptional humanitarian cases, particularly urgent medical cases, but not including marriage. It is possible to travel from the West Bank to Gaza only if the person pledges to permanently relocating to Gaza. Gazan residents are only admitted to Israel in exceptional humanitarian cases. Since 2008, they are not allowed to live or stay in Israel because of marriage with an Israeli. Israelis who want to visit their partner in Gaza need permits for a few months, and Israelis can visit their first‐degree relatives in Gaza only in exceptional humanitarian cases.

=== Africa ===
Freedom of movement laws and restrictions vary from country to country on the African continent, however several international agreements beyond those prescribed by the United Nations govern freedom of movement within the African continent. The African Charter on Human and People's Rights Article 12 outlines various forms of movement-related freedoms. It asserts:

1. Every individual shall have the right to freedom of movement and residence within the borders of a State provided he abides by the law.
2. Every individual shall have the right to leave any country including his own, and to return to his country. This right may only be subject to restrictions, provided for by law for the protection of national security, law and order, public health or morality.
3. Every individual shall have the right, when persecuted, to seek and obtain asylum in other countries in accordance with laws of those countries and international conventions.
4. A non-national legally admitted in a territory of a State Party to the present Charter, may only be expelled from it by virtue of a decision taken in accordance with the law.
5. The mass expulsion of non-nationals shall be prohibited. Mass expulsion shall be that which is aimed at national, racial, ethnic or religious groups.

The ideals of the Charter are, in principle, supported by all signatory governments, though they are not rigorously followed. There have been attempts to have intellectuals recognized as having special freedom of movement rights, to protect their intellectual ideals as they cross national boundaries.

==== South Africa ====
Under apartheid, freedom of movement for nonwhites was limited by pass laws beginning with the Natives (Urban Areas) Act 1923 requiring black men to have a pass with them to enter cities. After the National Party imposed apartheid in the 1950s, these laws were expanded to prohibit all non-whites from remaining in cities for longer than 72 hours. Beyond the African Charter on Human and People's Rights, the Constitution of South Africa also contains express freedoms of movement, in section 21 of Chapter 2. Freedom of movement is guaranteed to "everyone" in regard to leaving the country but is limited to citizens when entering it or staying in it. Citizens also have a right to a passport, critical to full exercise of the freedom of movement internationally.

=== Europe ===
==== France ====
Many countries mention freedom of movement in their constitutional texts, but France does not. Freedom of movement in France is ruled both by the Universal Declaration of Human Rights of 1948 and the Schengen Agreement of 1990, promoting freedom of movement and no more borders controls for European citizen on the European territory.

In theory, citizens in France are free to travel without any police control on the national territory. Although until the 1980s any person (either tourists or French citizens) had to fill up an information sheet then given to the police, writing on it its personal situation before booking a hotel room. This law does not exist anymore however.

Since the Schengen Agreement in 1990, freedom of movement slightly spread to 25 countries of the European Union (Cyprus is not a member yet; Ireland maintains an opt-out), and to Norway, Iceland, Switzerland and Liechtenstein as these countries own an associated status towards the EU. As European citizens, French people are free to go to one European country to another without restrictions.

France is one of the most welcomed countries in the world. Citizens are indeed able to travel to 186 destinations in the world, making France one of the most welcomed countries according to the Henley passport index.

==== Ireland ====
In Ireland, the Thirteenth Amendment was adopted in November 1992 by referendum in order to ensure freedom of movement in the specific circumstance of a woman traveling abroad to receive an abortion. However, with the successful repeal of the Eighth Amendment of the Irish Constitution on 25 May 2018, which ensures the right to an abortion, this previous amendment is no longer necessary.

==== Italy ====
In Italy, freedom of movement is enshrined in Article 16 of the Constitution, which states:

"Every citizen has the right to reside and travel freely in any part of the country, except for such general limitations as may be established by law for reasons of health or security. No restriction may be imposed for political reasons. Every citizen is free to leave the territory of the republic and return to it, notwithstanding any legal obligations."

The Svalbard area is an entirely visa-free zone.

==== Norway (Svalbard) ====
Uniquely, the Norwegian special territory of Svalbard is an entirely visa-free zone under the terms of the Svalbard Treaty.

==== Poland ====
Polish nationals holding dual citizenship are required to use Polish travel documents (a Polish passport or, within the European Union, a Polish National ID card (Dowód osobisty)) while travelling in the Schengen Area.

Poland requires all Polish citizens (including foreign citizens who are, who can be claimed to or are suspected to hold Polish citizenship) to enter and depart Poland using Polish travel documents.

==== Russia ====
Article 27 of The Russian Constitution states that "1.Every who legally stays in the territory of the Russian Federation shall have the right to free travel, choice of place of stay or residence. 2.Everyone may freely leave the Russian Federation. Citizens of the Russian Federation shall have the right to freely return to the Russian Federation."

Freedom of movement of Russian citizens around the country is legally limited in a number of situations, including the following:

- In closed cities (mainly nuclear research centers). Special permits are necessary for both visiting and settling there.
- In certain areas near Russia's international border.
- In areas with declared state of emergency.
- In the interests of justice (imprisonment, bailiff's order, arrest, undertaking not to leave during a criminal investigation etc.).
- For citizens under military conscription.

Since the abandonment of propiska system in 1993, new legislation on registration of residence was passed. Unlike propiska, which was a permit to reside in a certain area, registration of residence as worded in the law is merely notification. According to the Russian legislation, there are two types of registration which a person may obtain simultaneously. Permanent registration is obligatory and gives the right for property ownership, temporary registration can be received for a period of time due to rental contract. However, administrative procedures developed "in implementation" of the registration law imposed some conditions on registration which effectively made it depend on the landlord's assent. Since landlords are often not willing to register tenants or guests in their properties due to tax payments, many internal migrants are prevented from performing their legal duty to register. Before 2004, it was common for police to fine those having failed to register within 3 working days at a place of stay. In 2004, the maximum permitted registration lag was raised to 90 days making prosecution infeasible, removing practical obstacles to free movement.

The Russian citizens' right to leave Russia may be legally suspended on a number of reasons including:

- The case of obtaining access to classified documents while working for the state or the military, during the time when access is granted and up to 5 years afterwards. This limitation is commonly included as a provision in one's contract of employment.
- Detention on being prosecuted as a defendant or suspicion of committing a crime.
- Military conscription.

According to the 62 article of the Russian Constitution, citizen of Russia may have the citizenship of a foreign State (dual citizenship), but that does not "free him from the obligations stipulated by the Russian citizenship". Russian citizens possessing foreign citizenship may not enter or leave Russia on foreign travel documents. Russian consular offices do not grant visas to foreign passport holders who are (or are suspected to be) Russian citizens.

==== Serbia ====
Serbian citizens have the right to move and settle freely in the Republic of Serbia, to leave it, and to return to it.

Freedom of movement and residence and the right to leave the Republic of Serbia may be restricted by the law if this is necessary for the conduct of criminal proceedings, protection of public order and peace, prevention of the spread of infectious diseases, or defense of the Republic of Serbia.

==== Turkey ====
According to Article 23 of the Turkish Constitution, each individual in the Republic of Turkey has the right to travel from one place to another.

The freedom of a citizen to travel abroad may be restricted due to his / her citizenship duty or criminal investigation or prosecution.

Citizens can neither be deported nor denied entry into the country.

==== United Kingdom ====
Britons have long enjoyed a comparatively high level of freedom of movement. Apart from Magna Carta, the protection of rights and liberties in this field has tended to come from the common law rather than formal constitutional codes and conventions, and can be changed by Parliament without the protection of being entrenched in a constitution.

It has been proposed that a range of specific state restrictions on freedom of movement should be prohibited under a new or comprehensively amended Human Rights Act. The new basic legal prohibitions could include: road tolls and other curbs on freedom of travel and private vehicle ownership and use; personal identity cards (internal passports, citizenship licenses) that must be produced on demand for individuals to access public services and facilities; and legal requirements for citizens to register changes of address or partner with the state authorities.

=== North America ===
==== Canada ====
The Constitution of Canada contains mobility rights expressly in section 6 of the Canadian Charter of Rights and Freedoms. The rights specified include the right of citizens to leave and enter the country and the right of both citizens and permanent residents to move within its boundaries. However, the subsections protect poorer regions' affirmative action programs that favour residents who have lived in the region for longer. Section 6 mobility rights are among the select rights that cannot be limited by the Charter's notwithstanding clause.

Canada's Social Union Framework Agreement, an agreement between governments made in 1999, affirms that "All governments believe that the freedom of movement of Canadians to pursue opportunities anywhere in Canada is an essential element of Canadian citizenship." In the Agreement, it is pledged that "Governments will ensure that no new barriers to mobility are created in new social policy initiatives."

==== Saint Martin ====
In the island of Saint Martin, divided between Sint Maarten (part of the Netherlands) and the Collectivity of Saint Martin (part of France), freedom of movement is allowed between both halves of the island as stated in the 1648 Treaty of Concordia. It is possible that this may have influenced the development of a common identity in the island, which has led to a proposed unification of it.

==== United States ====
Freedom of movement under United States law is governed primarily by the Privileges and Immunities Clause of the United States Constitution which states, "The Citizens of each State shall be entitled to all Privileges and Immunities of Citizens in the several States." As far back as the circuit court ruling in Corfield v. Coryell, 6 Fed. Cas. 546 (1823), freedom of movement has been judicially recognized as a fundamental Constitutional right. In Paul v. Virginia, 75 U.S. 168 (1869), the Court defined freedom of movement as "right of free ingress into other States, and egress from them." However, the Supreme Court did not invest the federal government with the authority to protect freedom of movement. Under the "privileges and immunities" clause, this authority was given to the states, a position the Court held consistently through the years in cases such as Ward v. Maryland, 79 U.S. 418 (1871), the Slaughter-House Cases, 83 U.S. 36 (1873) and United States v. Harris, 106 U.S. 629 (1883).

Internationally, § 215 of the Immigration and Nationality Act of 1952 (currently codified at 8 U.S.C. § 1185), it is unlawful for a United States citizen to enter or exit the United States without a valid United States passport.

The State Department refused to issue passports to citizens who declined to swear that they were not Communists. This practice was ended following the 1958 Supreme Court Case Kent v. Dulles.

=== Oceania ===
==== Australia ====
No federal Australian legislation guarantees freedom of movement within the Commonwealth of Australia. Various Australian laws restrict the right on various grounds. Until 1 July 2016, Norfolk Island had immigration controls separate from those of the remainder of Australia and a permit was required for Australian citizens or residents to enter. In August 2014 the Australian Commonwealth Government proposed regulating the rights of Australian citizens to travel to and from designated areas associated with terrorism.

== See also ==
- Border control
- Customs union
- Freedoms of the air
- Global labor arbitrage
- Hypermobility (travel)
- Leave to enter
- Right of abode
- Right of asylum
- Right of return
- Right to mobility
- Transport divide
