= Saenz v. Roe =

Sáenz v. Roe
- Supreme Court of the United States

Argued January 13, 1999 Decided May 17, 1999
- Full case name: Rita L. Sáenz, Director, California Department of Social Services, et al., Petitioners v. Brenda Roe & Anna Doe etc.
- Citations: 526 U.S. 489 (more) 119 S. Ct. 1518; 143 L. Ed. 2d 689; 1999 U.S. LEXIS 3174; 67 U.S.L.W. 4291; 99 Cal. Daily Op. Service 3574; 99 Daily Journal DAR 4559; 1999 Colo. J. C.A.R. 2812; 12 Fla. L. Weekly Fed. S 227; 61 Soc. Sec. Rep. Service 75

Case history
- Prior: Roe v. Anderson, 966 F. Supp. 977 (E.D. Cal. 1997); affirmed, 134 F.3d 1400 (9th Cir. 1998); cert. granted, 524 U.S. 982 (1998).

Holding
- California statute limiting new residents' benefits for the first year they live in the state is an unconstitutional discrimination and violation of their right to travel.

Court membership
- Chief Justice William Rehnquist Associate Justices John P. Stevens · Sandra Day O'Connor; Antonin Scalia · Anthony Kennedy; David Souter · Clarence Thomas; Ruth Bader Ginsburg · Stephen Breyer

Case opinions
- Majority: Stevens, joined by O'Connor, Scalia, Kennedy, Souter, Ginsburg, Breyer
- Dissent: Rehnquist, joined by Thomas
- Dissent: Thomas, joined by Rehnquist

Laws applied
- U.S. Const. Art. IV § 2, amend. XIV § 1; Cal. Welf. & Inst. Code Ann. § 11450.03

Sáenz v. Roe, 526 U.S. 489 (1999), is a landmark case in which the Supreme Court of the United States discussed whether there is a constitutional right to travel from one state to another. The case was a reaffirmation of the principle that citizens select states and not the other way around.

== Background ==
In Edwards v. California (1941), the United States Supreme Court unanimously struck down a California law prohibiting the bringing of a non-resident "indigent person" into the state. The Court's majority opinion by Justice Byrnes declared the law to violate the Constitution's Commerce Clause. In concurring opinions, Justice Douglas (joined by Justices Black and Murphy) and Justice Jackson held that the law violated the Privileges or Immunities Clause of the Fourteenth Amendment.

In 1992, the state of California enacted a statute limiting the maximum welfare benefits available to newly arrived residents. At the time, California was paying the sixth-largest welfare benefits in the United States. In a move to reduce the state welfare budget, the California State Legislature enacted a statute (Cal. Welf. & Inst. Code Ann. §11450.03) to limit new residents, for the first year they live in the state, to the benefits they would have received in the state of their prior residence. For the state to comply with the then-existent Aid to Families with Dependent Children program, it needed a waiver from the United States Secretary of Health and Human Services (HHS) in order to qualify for federal reimbursement. Louis Wade Sullivan, who was HHS Secretary at that point, granted his approval in October 1992.

On December 21, 1992, three California residents who were eligible for AFDC benefits filed an action in the United States District Court for the Eastern District of California, challenging the constitutionality of the durational residency requirement. All of the plaintiffs alleged that they had moved into California to escape abusive family situations. The District Court judge temporarily enjoined the state from enforcing the statute, and the Ninth Circuit affirmed. The state then petitioned the Court for certiorari. In a separate proceeding, the HHS Secretary's approval of the statute was invalidated and so the Court did not reach the merits of the case.

In 1996, President Bill Clinton signed the Personal Responsibility and Work Opportunity Act (PRWORA) into law, which created the Temporary Assistance for Needy Families (TANF) program and expressly permitted states to limit aid to people who had been residents for less than a year. No longer requiring the approval of federal authorities, California began enforcing the statute.

== Procedural history ==
In 1997, the two plaintiffs in this case sued in the same court as the prior litigants, this time challenging both the California statute and the PRWORA's durational residency provision. The district court judge, David F. Levi, certified the case as a class action and issued a preliminary injunction. While the state argued that the statute was a legitimate use of its police powers (because it was largely a budgetary measure), Judge Levi still found for the plaintiffs and enjoined enforcement of the statute, on the grounds that it discriminated between newcomers to the state and long-time residents. The United States Court of Appeals for the Ninth Circuit affirmed.

== Majority opinion ==
Justice Stevens, writing for the majority, found that although the "right to travel" was not explicitly mentioned in the Constitution, the concept was "firmly embedded in our jurisprudence." He described three components of the right to travel:

1. The right to enter one state and leave another;
2. The right to be treated as a welcome visitor rather than a hostile stranger;
3. For those who want to become permanent residents, the right to be treated equally to native-born citizens.

Because the statute did not directly impair entry or exit from the state, Stevens declined to discuss the first aspect of the right to travel although he did mention that the right was expressly mentioned in the Articles of Confederation. He briefly described the scope of the Art. IV Privileges and Immunities Clause, but the main focus of his opinion was the application of the Fourteenth Amendment. For the proposition that this amendment protected a citizen's right to resettle in other states, Stevens cited the majority opinion in the Slaughter-House Cases:

Despite fundamentally differing views concerning the coverage of the Privileges or Immunities Clause of the Fourteenth Amendment, most notably expressed in the majority and dissenting opinions in the Slaughter-House Cases (1873), it has always been common ground that this Clause protects the third component of the right to travel. Writing for the majority in the Slaughter-House Cases, Justice Miller explained that one of the privileges conferred by this Clause "is that a citizen of the United States can, of his own volition, become a citizen of any State of the Union by a bona fide residence therein, with the same rights as other citizens of that State."

Justice Stevens further held in Sáenz that it was irrelevant that the statute only minimally impaired the plaintiffs' right to travel. The plaintiffs were new to the state of California, but they had the right to be treated the same as long-time residents, especially given that their need for welfare benefits was unrelated to the amount of time they had spent in the state. Furthermore, wrote Stevens, there was no reason for the state to fear that citizens of other states would take advantage of California's relatively generous welfare benefits because the proceeds of each welfare check would be consumed while the plaintiffs remained within the state. This distinguishes them from a "readily portable benefit, such as a divorce or a college education", for which durational residency requirements had been upheld in cases such as Sosna v. Iowa and Vlandis v. Kline.

California justified the statute solely on fiscal grounds, and Stevens held that this justification was insufficient. The state could have found another non-discriminatory way to reduce welfare costs, other than conditioning the welfare benefit amounts of new residents by reference to their length of stay within the state, or their state of prior residence. Moreover, the fact that PRWORA authorized states to set their own benefit levels did not assist in the determining the constitutionality of the state statute because Congress cannot authorize states to violate the Fourteenth Amendment.

== Rehnquist's dissent ==
Chief Justice Rehnquist dissented on the grounds that he did not think that the Fourteenth Amendment's Privileges or Immunities Clause required the result reached by the majority, especially considering that the clause had been applied only a few times since the ratification of the amendment. Rehnquist reasoned that although they are related, the right to become a citizen of another state was not the same as the right to travel. Furthermore, he claimed that becoming a citizen of another state required both physical presence within the state and a subjective intent to remain there. Since residency requirements pertain to the latter factor of citizenship, Rehnquist reasoned they should not be unconstitutional.

== Thomas's dissent ==
Justice Thomas dissented separately, because he felt that the majority attributed a meaning to the Fourteenth Amendment Privileges or Immunities Clause that its framers did not intend. He lamented the decision of the Slaughterhouse Cases which basically turned the clause into a nullity. He looked to the historical meaning and use of the language in the clause, citing the Charter of 1606, which guaranteed the citizens of Virginia therein all the "Liberties, Franchises, and Immunities" of a person born in England. He also noted that the phrase was used in the Articles of Confederation, which was then imported into Article IV of the Constitution.

Finally, he suggested that the meaning of the Privileges or Immunities Clause of the Fourteenth Amendment should be read the same way that Article IV's Privileges and Immunities Clause was interpreted. He cited Justice Bushrod Washington's interpretation of the latter clause in the famous case of Corfield v. Coryell (E.D. Pa. 1823) and stated that this is what the framers of the Fourteenth Amendment had intended. Thomas made a case for the revival of the clause to protect fundamental rights of citizens.

== See also ==
- Dred Scott v. Sandford (1857)
- Shapiro v. Thompson (1969)
- List of United States Supreme Court cases, volume 526
- List of United States Supreme Court cases
- Lists of United States Supreme Court cases by volume
