= United States v. South-Eastern Underwriters Ass'n =

United States v. South-Eastern Underwriters Association
- Supreme Court of the United States

Argued January 11, 1944 Decided June 5, 1944
- Full case name: United States v. South-Eastern Underwriters Association, et al.
- Citations: 322 U.S. 533 (more) 64 S. Ct. 1162; 88 L. Ed. 1440; 1944 U.S. LEXIS 1199; 1944 Trade Cas. (CCH) ¶ 57,253

Holding
- Congress can regulate insurance under the Commerce Clause.

Court membership
- Chief Justice Harlan F. Stone Associate Justices Owen Roberts · Hugo Black; Stanley F. Reed · Felix Frankfurter; William O. Douglas · Frank Murphy; Robert H. Jackson · Wiley B. Rutledge

Case opinions
- Majority: Black, joined by Douglas, Murphy, Rutledge
- Dissent: Stone
- Dissent: Frankfurter
- Dissent: Jackson
- Roberts and Reed took no part in the consideration or decision of the case.

Laws applied
- Sherman Act
- This case overturned a previous ruling or rulings
- Paul v. Virginia (1869) (in part).

United States v. South-Eastern Underwriters Association, 322 U.S. 533 (1944), is a United States Supreme Court case in which the Court held that the Sherman Act, the federal antitrust statute, applied to insurance. To reach this decision, the Court held that insurance could be regulated by the United States Congress under the Commerce Clause, overturning Paul v. Virginia. Congress responded by enacting the McCarran-Ferguson Act of 1945 which limited antitrust laws' applicability to the business and assured state authority would continue over insurance.

In his partial dissent at 322 U.S. 588, Justice Robert H. Jackson of the Supreme Court said:

4. Any enactment by Congress either of partial or of comprehensive regulations of the insurance business would come to us with the most forceful presumption of constitutional validity. The fiction that insurance is not commerce could not be sustained against such a presumption, for resort to the facts would support the presumption in favor of the congressional action. The fiction therefore must yield to congressional action, and continues only at the sufferance of Congress. 5. Congress also may, without exerting its full regulatory powers over the subject, and without challenging the basis or supplanting the details of state regulation, enact prohibitions of any acts in pursuit of the insurance business which substantially affect or unduly burden or restrain interstate commerce.

== See also ==
- United States corporate law
