= Baldwin v. Fish & Game Commission of Montana =

- Supreme Court of the United States

Argued October 5, 1977 Decided May 23, 1978
- Full case name: Lester Baldwin, et al. v. Fish & Game Commission of Montana, et al.
- Citations: 436 U.S. 371 (more) 98 S. Ct. 1852; 56 L. Ed. 2d 354

Holding
- Recreational hunting is not a fundamental right and therefore is not within the purview of privileges and immunities clause. The Montana statutory does not violate the equal protection clause.

Court membership
- Chief Justice Warren E. Burger Associate Justices William J. Brennan Jr. · Potter Stewart; Byron White · Thurgood Marshall; Harry Blackmun · Lewis F. Powell Jr. William Rehnquist · John P. Stevens

Case opinions
- Majority: Blackmun, joined by Burger, Stewart, Powell, Rehnquist, Stevens
- Concurrence: Burger
- Dissent: Brennan, joined by White, Marshall

Baldwin v. Fish & Game Commission of Montana, 436 U.S. 371 (1978), was a United States Supreme Court case that affirmed the right of the state of Montana to charge higher fees for out-of-state elk hunters.

== Background ==
In the state of Montana, the fee for an elk-hunting licenses for nonresidents of the state were substantially higher than the fee for residents of the state in the 1970s.

== Decision of the Court ==
In a 6–3 decision in favor of the state of Montana, Justice Blackmun wrote the opinion for the majority. The court found that the licensing system bore some rational relationship to legitimate state purposes. The court concluded that the nonresidents' interest in sharing the limited resource on more equal terms with residents simply did not fall within the purview of the Privileges and Immunities Clause. Equality in access to state elk was not basic to the maintenance or well-being of the union, and whatever rights or activities were fundamental under the Privileges and Immunities Clause, elk hunting by nonresidents was not one of them. The legislative choice was an economic means not unreasonably related to the preservation of a finite resource and a substantial regulatory interest of the state because it served to limit the number of hunter days.

== See also ==
- List of United States Supreme Court cases, volume 436
