= Slaughter-House Cases =

- Supreme Court of the United States

Argued January 11, 1872 Reargued February 3–5, 1873 Decided April 14, 1873
- Full case name: The Butchers' Benevolent Association of New Orleans v. The Crescent City Live-Stock Landing and Slaughter-House Company; Paul Esteben, L. Ruch, J. P. Rouede, W. Maylie, S. Firmberg, B. Beaubay, William Fagan, J. D. Broderick, N. Seibel, M. Lannes, J. Gitzinger, J. P. Aycock, D. Verges, The Live-Stock Dealers' and Butchers' Association of New Orleans, and Charles Cavaroc v. The State of Louisiana, ex rel. S. Belden, Attorney-General; The Butchers' Benevolent Association of New Orleans v. The Crescent City Live-Stock Landing and Slaughter-House Company
- Citations: 83 U.S. 36 (more) 16 Wall. 36; 21 L. Ed. 394; 1872 U.S. LEXIS 1139

Case history
- Prior: Error to the Supreme Court of Louisiana

Holding
- The Fourteenth Amendment only protects the privileges and immunities pertaining to citizenship of the United States, not those that pertain to state citizenship.

Court membership
- Chief Justice Salmon P. Chase Associate Justices Nathan Clifford · Noah H. Swayne; Samuel F. Miller · David Davis; Stephen J. Field · William Strong; Joseph P. Bradley · Ward Hunt

Case opinions
- Majority: Miller, joined by Clifford, Davis, Strong, Hunt
- Dissent: Field, joined by Chase, Swayne, Bradley
- Dissent: Swayne
- Dissent: Bradley

Laws applied
- U.S. Const. Art. IV. sec. 2, 13th, 14th, 15th Amendments

The Slaughter-House Cases, 83 U.S. 36 (1873), is a landmark decision of the Supreme Court of the United States that ruled that the Privileges or Immunities Clause of the Fourteenth Amendment to the U.S. Constitution only protects the legal rights that are associated with federal U.S. citizenship, not those that pertain to state citizenship. Though the decision in the Slaughter-House Cases minimized the impact of the Privileges or Immunities Clause on state law, the Supreme Court would later incorporate the Bill of Rights through substantive due process.

Ostensibly seeking to improve sanitary conditions, the Louisiana legislature and the city of New Orleans had established a corporation charged with regulating the slaughterhouse industry. Members of the Butchers' Benevolent Association challenged the constitutionality of the corporation's monopoly, claiming that it violated the Fourteenth Amendment. The amendment had been ratified in the aftermath of the American Civil War with the primary intention of protecting civil rights of millions of newly emancipated freedmen in the Southern United States, but the butchers argued that the amendment protected their right to "sustain their lives through labor".

In the majority opinion written by Associate Justice Samuel Freeman Miller, the Court held to a narrower interpretation of the Fourteenth Amendment than the plaintiffs urged, ruling that it did not restrict the police powers exercised by Louisiana because the Privileges or Immunities Clause protected only those rights guaranteed by the United States, not individual states. In effect, the clause was interpreted to convey limited protection pertinent to a small minority of rights, such as the right to seek federal office.

In a dissenting opinion, Associate Justice Stephen J. Field wrote that Miller's opinion effectively rendered the Fourteenth Amendment a "vain and idle enactment".

== Background ==
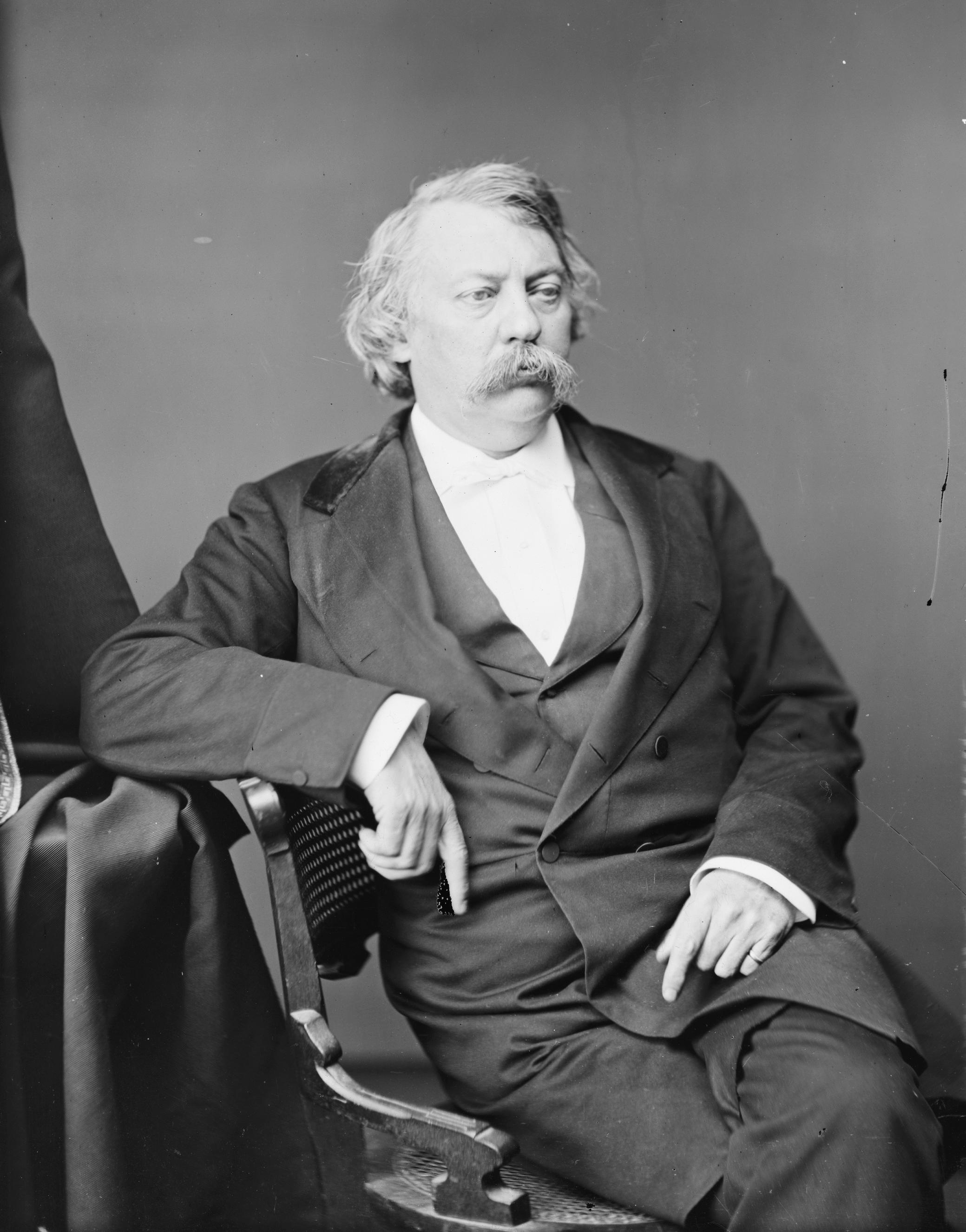
Matthew H. Carpenter, the lawyer who argued for Louisiana

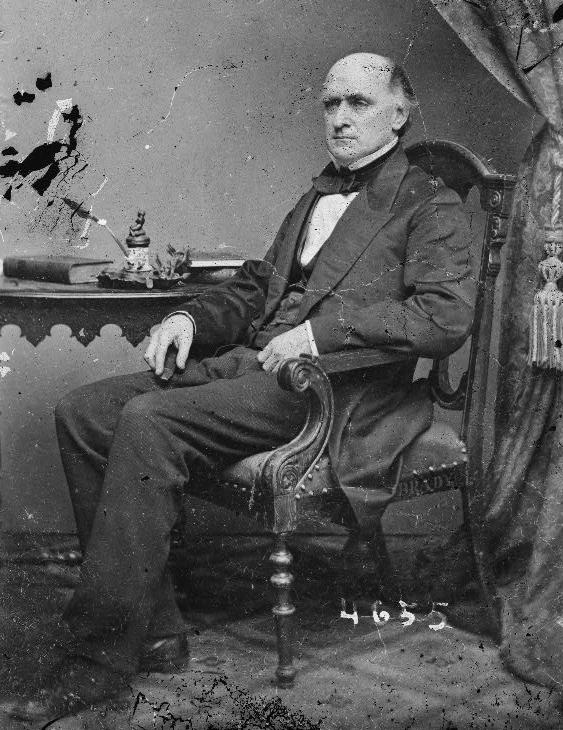
John Archibald Campbell, the lawyer who argued for the butchers

One writer described New Orleans in the mid-nineteenth century as plagued by "intestines and portions of putrefied animal matter lodged [around the drinking pipes]" whenever the tide from the Mississippi River was low; the offal came from the city's slaughterhouses. A mile and a half upstream from the city, 1,000 butchers gutted more than 300,000 animals per year. Animal entrails (known as offal), dung, blood, and urine contaminated New Orleans's drinking water, which was implicated in cholera and yellow fever outbreaks among the population.

To try to control the problem, a New Orleans grand jury recommended that the slaughterhouses be moved south, but since many of the slaughterhouses were outside city limits, the grand jury's recommendations carried no weight. The city appealed to the state legislature. As a result, in 1869, the Louisiana legislature passed "An Act to Protect the Health of the City of New Orleans, to Locate the Stock Landings and Slaughter Houses, and to incorporate the Crescent City Livestock Landing and Slaughter-House Company", which allowed the city of New Orleans to create a corporation that centralized all slaughterhouse operations in the city. At the time, New York City, San Francisco, Boston, Milwaukee, and Philadelphia had similar provisions to confine butchers' establishments to particular areas in order to keep offal from contaminating the water supply.

The legislature chartered a private corporation, the Crescent City Live-Stock Landing and Slaughter-House Company, to run a Grand Slaughterhouse at the southern part of the city, opposite the Mississippi River. Crescent City would not slaughter beef itself but act as a franchise corporation, by renting out space to other butchers in the city for a fee, under a designated maximum.

The statute also granted "sole and exclusive privilege of conducting and carrying on the livestock landing and slaughterhouse business within the limits and privilege granted by the act, and that all such animals shall be landed at the stock landings and slaughtered at the slaughterhouses of the company, and nowhere else. Penalties are enacted for infractions of this provision, and prices fixed for the maximum charges of the company for each steamboat and for each animal landed". The exclusivity would last for a period of 25 years. All other slaughterhouses would be closed up, forcing butchers to slaughter within the operation set up by Crescent City. The statute forbade Crescent City from favoring one butcher over another by promising harsh penalties for refusal to sell space to any butcher. All animals on the premises would be inspected by an officer appointed by the governor of the state.

Over 400 members of the Butchers' Benevolent Association joined to sue to stop Crescent City's takeover of the slaughterhouse industry. In the background of his majority opinion, Supreme Court Justice Samuel Freeman Miller reiterated the concerns of the butchers:

This statute is denounced [by the butchers] not only as creating a monopoly and conferring odious and exclusive privileges upon a small number of persons at the expense of the great body of the community of New Orleans, but it is asserted that it deprives a large and meritorious class of citizens—the whole of the butchers of the city—of the right to exercise their trade, the business to which they have been trained and on which they depend for the support of themselves and their families, and that the unrestricted exercise of the business of butchering is necessary to the daily subsistence of the population of the city.

The lower courts had found in favor of Crescent City in all cases.

Six cases were appealed to the Supreme Court. The butchers based their claims on the due process, privileges or immunities, and equal protection clauses of the Fourteenth Amendment, which had been ratified by the states five years earlier. It had been passed with the intention of protecting the civil rights of the millions of newly emancipated freedmen in the South, who had been granted citizenship in the United States.

The butchers' attorney, former Supreme Court Justice John Archibald Campbell, who had retired from the federal bench because of his Confederate loyalties, represented persons in a number of cases in New Orleans to obstruct Radical Reconstruction. Although the Fourteenth Amendment was passed mainly to protect the freedmen in the South, the language of Section 1 is not racially limited. Campbell used it to argue for a new, broad reading of the Fourteenth Amendment, in order to allow butchers of any race to "sustain their lives through labor".

== Decision ==
On April 14, 1873, the Supreme Court issued a 5–4 decision in favor of the slaughterhouse company upholding the constitutionality of Louisiana's use of its police powers to regulate butchers.

=== Opinion of the Court ===
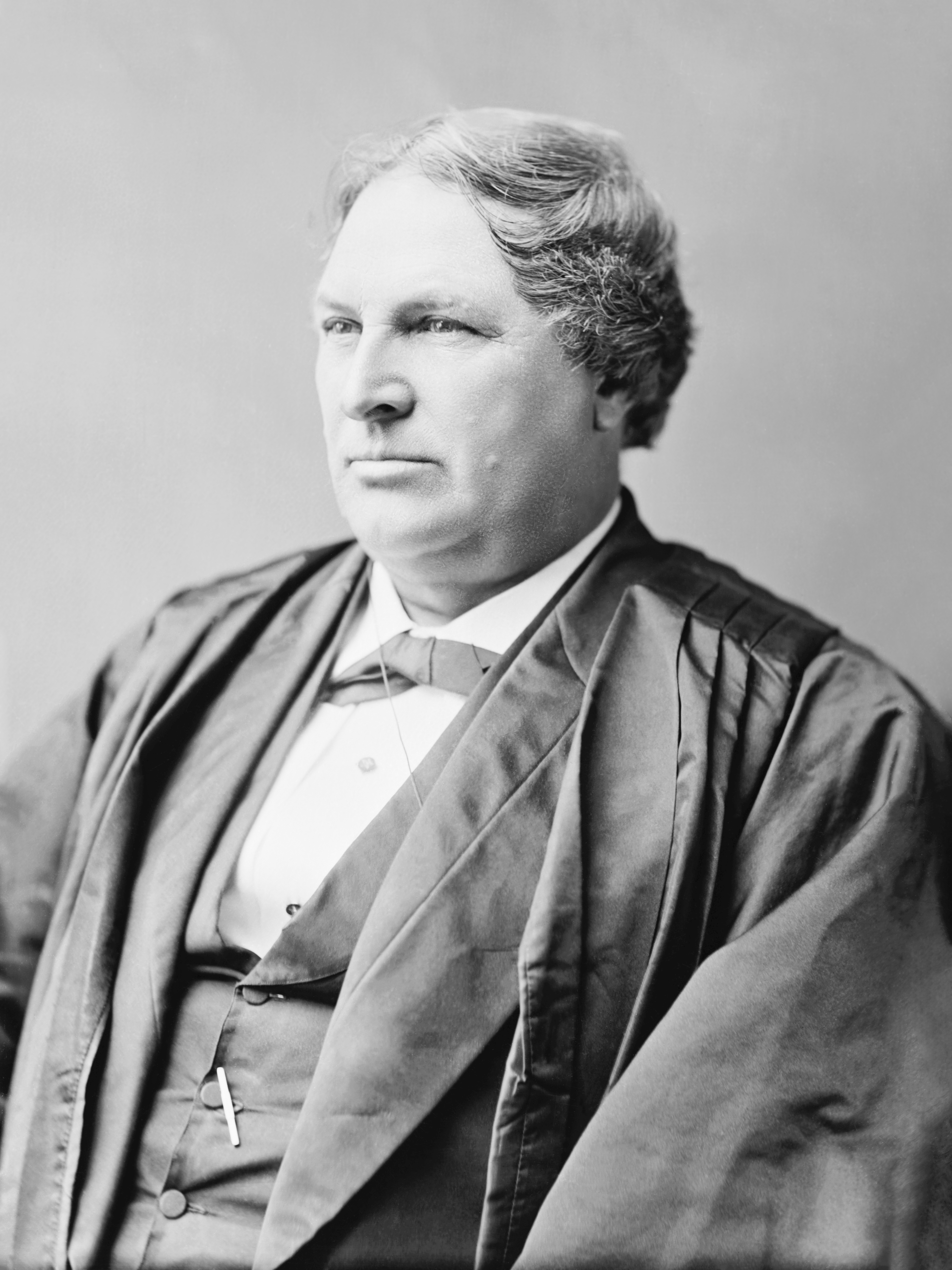
Justice Samuel Freeman Miller, the author of the majority opinion in the Slaughter-House Cases

Writing for the majority, Associate Justice Samuel Freeman Miller framed the Thirteenth and Fourteenth Amendments as primarily protecting former black slaves. Accordingly, the Supreme Court rejected the butchers' Equal Protection Clause arguments, believing that it only prohibited anti-Black discrimination. The Due Process Clause claims were also rejected by declining to consider modified labor conditions as a deprivation of property.

Agreeing with the Louisiana Supreme Court that the butchers' interpretation of the Privileges or Immunities Clause would turn federal courts into "a perpetual censor upon all legislation of the states," the Supreme Court described the clause as only protecting the rights of national citizenship, rather than the more expansive rights of state citizenship. Noting that the Fourteenth Amendment begins with the Citizenship Clause conferring national citizenship upon freed black slaves to supersede the Court's 1857 decision in Dred Scott v. Sandford, Miller concluded that the amendment only focuses on the rights of national citizenship. In identifying some of the privileges and immunities of federal citizenship, Miller relied on Bushrod Washington's earlier listing in Corfield v. Coryell (1823) which included the right to travel, seek habeas corpus, and hold property in multiple states.

While Miller's opinion is remembered as diminishing the Privileges or Immunities Clause's ability to protect the civil rights of African Americans, historians believe that he intended to protect the biracial Louisiana State Legislature from national interference. Campbell had hoped to use the case to undermine the state government's legitimacy, and southern newspapers condemned the decision for strengthening the Reconstruction era state government.

=== Dissents ===
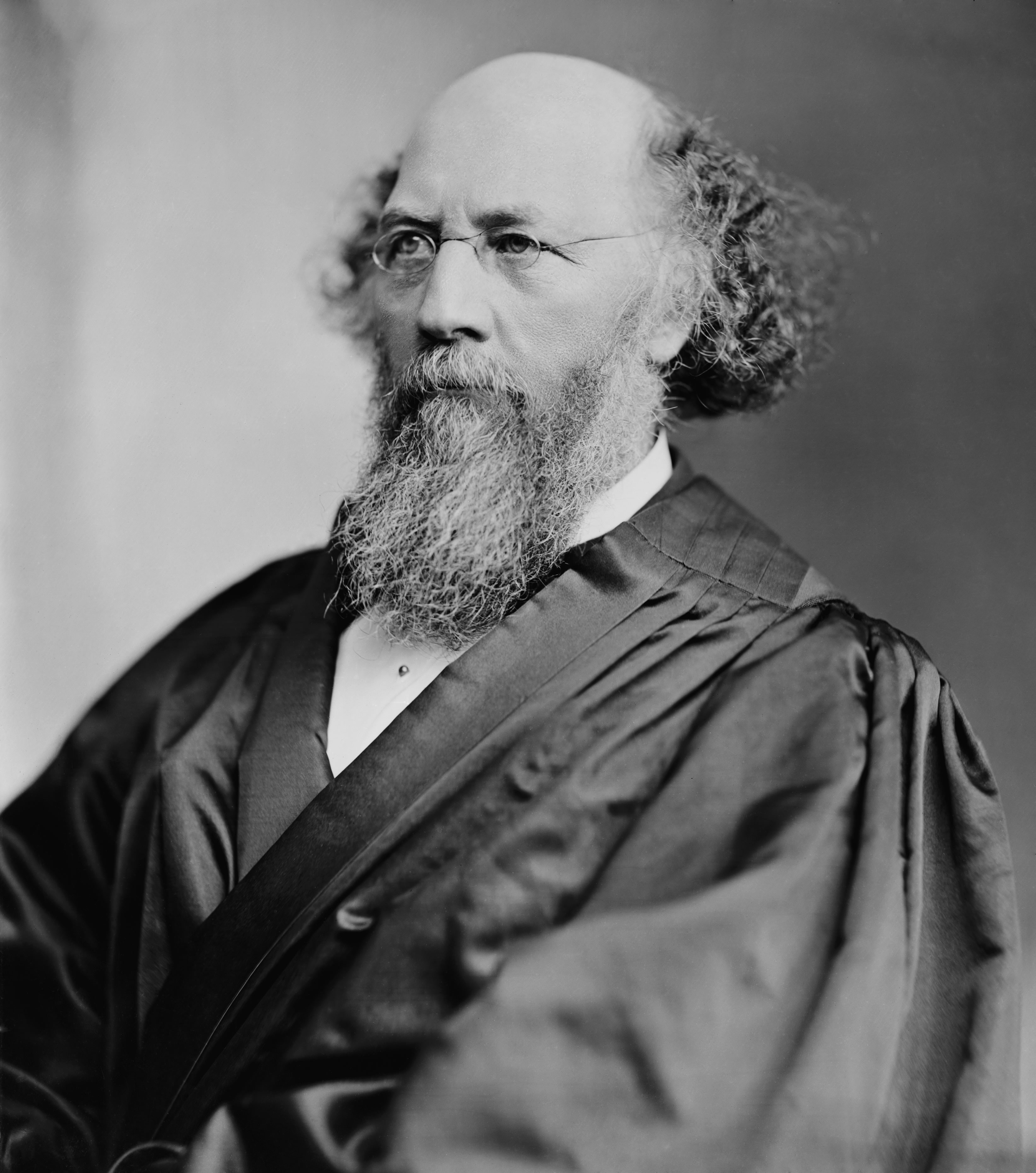
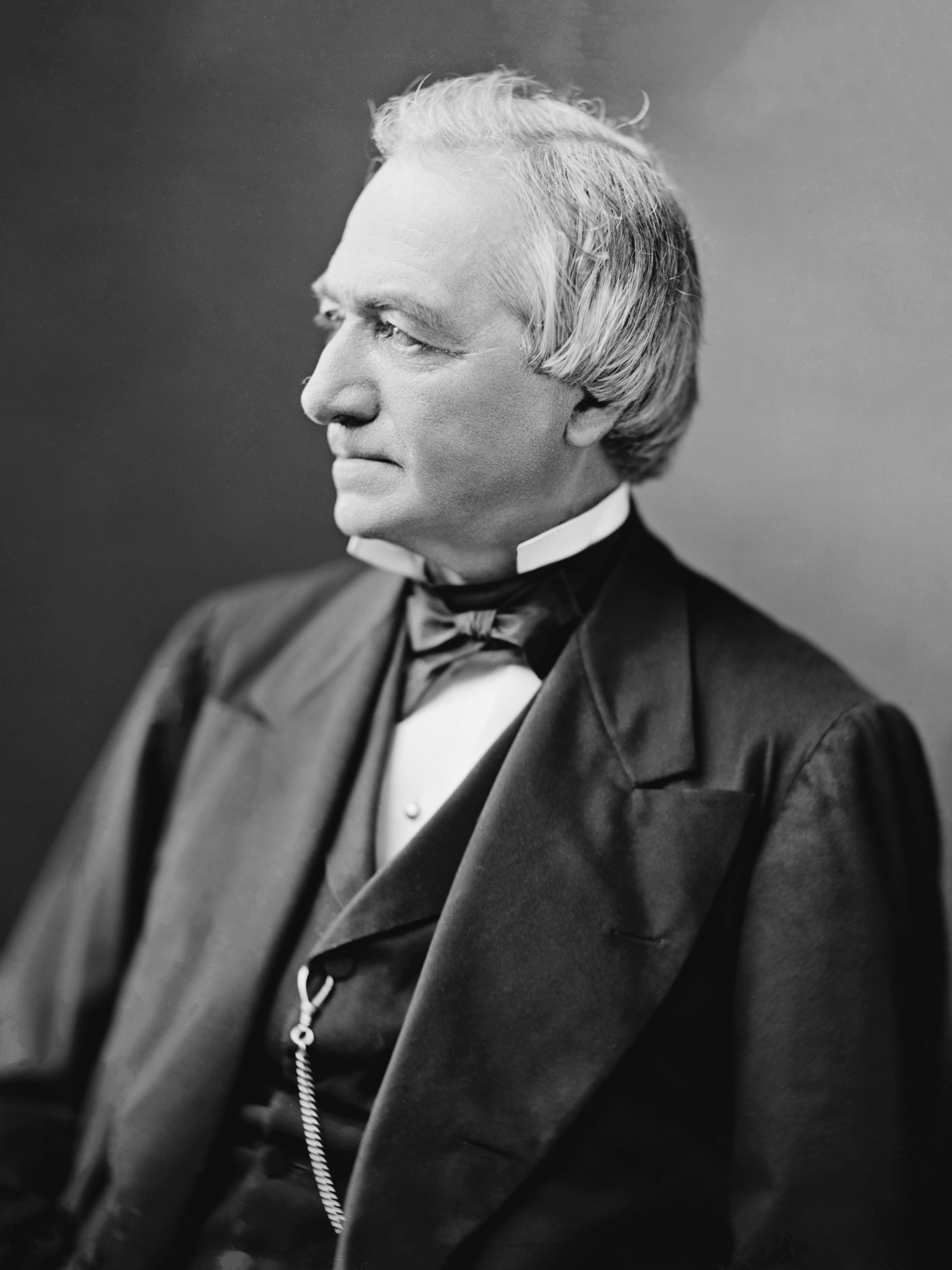
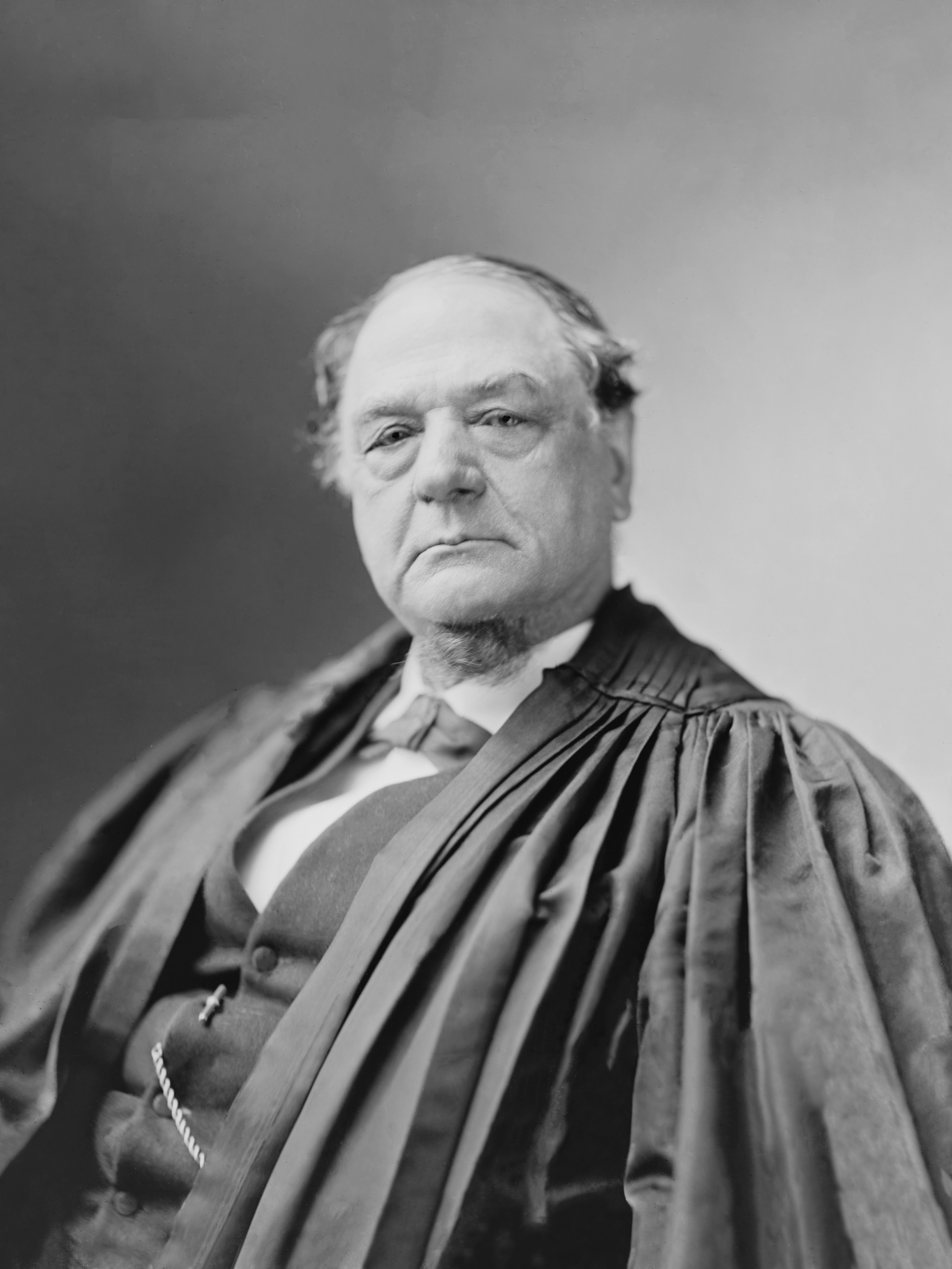
Justices Stephen J. Field (left), Joseph P. Bradley (center), and Noah H. Swayne (right), the authors of the dissenting opinions in Slaughter-House

Four justices dissented from the Court's decision, and three of them wrote dissenting opinions.

Justice Stephen J. Field protested that Miller's narrow reading of the Fourteenth Amendment rendered it "a vain and idle enactment, which accomplished nothing and most unnecessarily excited Congress and the people on its passage." Field accepted Campbell's reading of the amendment as not confined to protection of freed slaves but embracing the common law presumption in favor of an individual right to pursue a legitimate occupation. Field's reading of the due process clause of the amendment would prevail in future cases in which the court read the amendment broadly to protect personal interests against hostile state laws..

Justice Joseph P. Bradley's dissent argued that the Privileges or Immunities Clause incorporated the Bill of Rights against the states. In Bradley's view, the Citizenship Clause had elevated national citizenship above state citizenship, demanding recognition of new rights against state regulation.

Justice Noah H. Swayne's dissent criticized the Court's rejection of the notion that the Fourteenth Amendment and its Privileges or Immunities Clause had been intended to transform American government. Speaking of the Court's objection that a broad reading of the Clause would make it a "perpetual censor" on state governments, Swayne said that Congress and the states had been aware of that when they adopted the Fourteenth Amendment.

It is objected that the power conferred is novel and large. The answer is that the novelty was known and the measure deliberately adopted. ... It is necessary to enable the government of the nation to secure to everyone within its jurisdiction the rights and privileges enumerated, which, according to the plainest considerations of reason and justice and the fundamental principles of the social compact, all are entitled to enjoy. Without such authority, any government claiming to be national is glaringly defective.

— Slaughter-House Cases, 83 U.S. at 129 (Swayne, J., dissenting).

== Subsequent developments ==
The victory of the Crescent City Company survived for only 11 years. By 1879, the State of Louisiana had adopted a new constitution prohibiting the state's ability to grant slaughterhouse monopolies, devolving regulation of cattle slaughter to parishes and municipalities, and banning the subordinate governmental units from granting monopoly rights over such activities. Having essentially lost its monopoly protection, the Crescent City Co. sued. That case ended in Butchers' Union Co. v. Crescent City Co. (1884), with the Supreme Court holding that Crescent City Co. did not have a contract with the state and so that revocation of the monopoly privilege was not a violation of the Contract Clause.

== Analysis ==
The Slaughter-House Cases essentially "gutted" the Privileges or Immunities Clause. The American scholar Edward Samuel Corwin remarked: "Unique among constitutional provisions, the privileges and immunities clause of the Fourteenth Amendment enjoys the distinction of having been rendered a practical nullity by a single decision of the Supreme Court rendered within five years after its ratification."

The Supreme Court has used the Privileges or Immunities Clause to declare a law unconstitutional only one time in the modern era, in the 1999 case Saenz v. Roe where it examined a California law barring new state residents from receiving welfare benefits. While he dissented, Justice Clarence Thomas nevertheless took the opportunity to criticize the Slaughter-House Cases, stating, "Legal scholars agree on little beyond the conclusion that the Clause does not mean what the Court said it meant in 1873." Thomas later expanded on his view of the Clause, at least as it relates to incorporating the Bill of Rights against the States, in McDonald v. Chicago. In 2001, the American legal scholar Akhil Reed Amar similarly wrote of the Slaughter-House Cases: "Virtually no serious modern scholar—left, right, and center—thinks that the decision is a plausible reading of the [Fourteenth] Amendment." This view was echoed by historian Eric Foner, who wrote "[T]he Court's ... studied distinction between the privileges deriving from state and national citizenship should have been seriously doubted by anyone who read the Congressional debates of the 1860s".

Kevin Gutzman, an American constitutional scholar and historian, argues that the Fourteenth Amendment was originally meant to protect only "specifically federal rights" and describes the later, broader interpretation of the Amendment as "the Court's [use of] the Fourteenth Amendment to claim a capacious national judicial authority". Gutzman believes that "legal academics despise the Slaughterhouse decision because they do think the federal courts should be 'a perpetual censor upon all legislation in the States'".

== See also ==
- Chase Court
