= Corfield v. Coryell =

Landmark U.S. federal court case

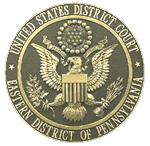
- Court: U.S. Circuit Court for the Eastern District of Pennsylvania
- Decided: 1823

Holding
- New Jersey's law forbidding non-residents from gathering oysters and clams does not violate the Privileges and Immunities Clause or regulate commerce in violation of the Commerce Clause.

Court membership
- Judge sitting: Bushrod Washington

Corfield v. Coryell (6 Fed. Cas. 546, no. 3,230 C.C.E.D.Pa. 1823) is a landmark decision decided by Justice Bushrod Washington, sitting as a judge for the U.S. Circuit Court for the Eastern District of Pennsylvania. In it, he upheld a New Jersey regulation forbidding non-residents from gathering oysters and clams against a challenge that New Jersey's law violated the Article IV Privileges and Immunities Clause and that the New Jersey law regulated interstate commerce in violation of the Commerce Clause.

== Background ==
In 1820, the New Jersey legislature passed a law that prevented the harvesting of oysters from May until September, and allowing only residents of New Jersey to harvest oysters during the rest of the year. The plaintiff, who was not a New Jersey resident, operated a vessel, the Hiram, in the Maurice river cove in order to harvest oysters. This vessel was then seized according to that New Jersey law.

The plaintiff brought a trespass action in federal court in order to challenge the seizure of the Hiram. The plaintiff also challenged the law on four constitutional grounds:

1. It is unconstitutional due to interfering with the Commerce Clause, which gives Congress, not state legislatures, the power to regulate interstate commerce.
2. It violates the Privileges and Immunities Clause, which states that, "The Citizens of each State shall be entitled to all Privileges and Immunities of Citizens in the several States."
3. It violates Article III Section II of the Constitution, which states that "the judicial power of the United States should extend to all cases of admiralty and maritime jurisdiction."
4. It violates the Fourth Amendment, as the seizure was made without a warrant. This argument appears to have been abandoned, as it was not addressed in the Court's opinion.

== Decision ==
The Court ultimately upheld the constitutionality of New Jersey's law.

With regards to the Commerce Clause, Justice Washington found that Congress's power to regulate commerce "does by no means impair the right of the state government to legislate upon all subjects of internal police within their territorial limits ... even although such legislation may indirectly and remotely affect commerce, provided it do not interfere with the regulations of congress upon the same subject." He cited Gibbons v. Ogden in this reasoning, providing verbatim the list of allowed state laws mentioned in that decision: "inspection, quarantine, and health laws; laws regulating the internal commerce of the state; laws establishing and regulating turnpike roads, ferries, canals, and the like." Washington also argued that the New Jersey law does not affect articles of commerce directly, by making a crucial distinction: "the law does not inhibit the buying and selling of oysters after they are lawfully gathered, and have become articles of trade; but it forbids the removal of them from the beds in which they grow." As state laws that regulate the manner of taking of articles of trade such as "[p]aving stones, sand, and many other things" could not possibly be said to be unconstitutional, the Justice concluded that the New Jersey law did not fall afoul of the Commerce Clause.

Next, Washington treated the Privileges and Immunities Clause issue. The perhaps most-cited aspect of Corfield v. Coryell is Justice Washington's listing of the "privileges and immunities" enjoyed by citizens of the United States:

The inquiry is, what are the privileges and immunities of citizens in the several states? We feel no hesitation in confining these expressions to those privileges and immunities which are, in their nature, fundamental; which belong, of right, to the citizens of all free governments; and which have, at all times, been enjoyed by the citizens of the several states which compose this Union, from the time of their becoming free, independent, and sovereign. What these fundamental principles are, it would perhaps be more tedious than difficult to enumerate. They may, however, be all comprehended under the following general heads: Protection by the government; the enjoyment of life and liberty, with the right to acquire and possess property of every kind, and to pursue and obtain happiness and safety; subject nevertheless to such restraints as the government may justly prescribe for the general good of the whole. The right of a citizen of one state to pass through, or to reside in any other state, for purposes of trade, agriculture, professional pursuits, or otherwise; to claim the benefit of the writ of habeas corpus; to institute and maintain actions of any kind in the courts of the state; to take, hold and dispose of property, either real or personal; and an exemption from higher taxes or impositions that are paid by the other citizens of the state; may be mentioned as some of the particular privileges and immunities of citizens, which are clearly embraced by the general description of privileges deemed to be fundamental: to which may be added, the elective franchise, as regulated and established by the laws or constitution of the state in which it is to be exercised. These, and many others which might be mentioned, are, strictly speaking, privileges and immunities, and the enjoyment of them by the citizens of each state, in every other state, was manifestly calculated (to use the expressions of the preamble of the corresponding provision in the old articles of confederation) "the better to secure and perpetuate mutual friendship and intercourse among the people of the different states of the Union."

Thus, Washington concluded that the right to harvesting oysters, not being included in the list of these fundamental privileges and immunities of citizens, was not bound to be extended to all non-state citizens. The opinion concluded that "[the right] of fishing belongs to all the citizens or subjects of the state" who are "exclusively entitled to the use of it." Washington also added a practical consideration for this distinction: although the state's supply of oysters "may be abundantly sufficient for the use of the citizens of that state," its supply might be "totally exhausted and destroyed" if citizens from all other states were equally entitled to make use of them.

For the argument that the law violates the judicial power of the United States in cases of admiralty and maritime jurisdiction (enumerated in Article III Section II), the opinion states that this power was likely still vested in the States, not in the national government. Then, the opinion demonstrates how the area in question is within the jurisdiction of both New Jersey and Cumberland County. Finally, the opinion indicates that an action of trespass from the owner of the vessel is not warranted, because as the vessel was rented out to the plaintiff, the owner of the vessel cannot pass such an action.

== Influence on Fourteenth Amendment ==
The well-known passage from Corfield was quoted in reference to the first section of the Fourteenth Amendment (substantially authored by John Bingham), during congressional debates for an indication of what the judiciary had interpreted the phrase "privileges and immunities" to mean as it stood in the original Constitution (Article 4 Section 2). However, there is substantial evidence to the effect that some congressmen, when the Fourteenth Amendment was passed did not accept Justice Washington's reading of the term. Justice Washington's assessment is often cited by those who advocate a broader reading of the Fourteenth Amendment Privileges or Immunities Clause than the Supreme Court gave in the Slaughter-House Cases.

== See also ==
- Sohappy v. Smith
