= Privileges or Immunities Clause =

Part of Amendment XIV of the US Constitution

The Privileges or Immunities Clause is Amendment XIV, Section 1, Clause 2 of the United States Constitution. Along with the rest of the Fourteenth Amendment, this clause became part of the Constitution on July 9, 1868.

== Text of the clause ==
The clause states:

No State shall make or enforce any law which shall abridge the privileges or immunities of citizens of the United States....

== Drafting and adoption ==
The primary author of the Privileges or Immunities Clause was Congressman John Bingham of Ohio. The common historical view is that Bingham's primary inspiration, at least for his initial prototype of this Clause, was the Privileges and Immunities Clause in Article Four of the United States Constitution, which provided that "The Citizens of each State shall be entitled to all Privileges and Immunities of Citizens in the several States".

On February 3, 1866, the Joint Committee on Reconstruction (also known as the "Joint Committee of Fifteen") voted in favor of a draft constitutional amendment proposed by Bingham. The draft constitutional amendment provided:

The Congress shall have power to make all laws which shall be necessary and proper to secure to the citizens of each state all privileges and immunities of citizens in the several states....

This language closely tracked the existing language in the Privileges and Immunities Clause. On February 28, 1866, Bingham expressed his opinion that this draft language would give Congress power to "secure to the citizens of each State all the privileges and immunities of citizens of the United States in the several States", and he added that "[t]he proposition pending before the House is simply a proposition to arm the Congress…with the power to enforce the bill of rights as it stands in the constitution today. It hath that extent—no more…If the State laws do not interfere, those immunities follow under the Constitution".

According to Bingham, Congress lacked the power to enforce the Privileges and Immunities Clause under the original, unamended U.S. Constitution, and so he wanted the privileges and immunities of United States citizens to become a part of the Fourteenth Amendment. On May 14, 1868 he stated that the aim of the Privileges or Immunities Clause is that the constitution of a U.S. state "never should be so construed, and never should be so enforced as to deprive any citizen of the United States of the rights and privileges of a citizen of the United States within the limits of that State. The fourteenth article of the amendments of the Constitution secures this power to the Congress of the United States." As he stated on January 30, 1871 in the House Report No. 22 from the House Judiciary Committee, which he led, the Privileges or Immunities Clause was deemed necessary for the enforcement of the Privileges or Immunities Clause as an express limitation upon the powers of the States. The rights and privileges of a citizen of the United States were defined by Congress in the Civil Rights Act of 1866:

All persons within the jurisdiction of the United States shall have the same right in every State and Territory to make and enforce contracts, to sue, be parties, give evidence, and to the full and equal benefit of all laws and proceedings for the security of persons and property as is enjoyed by white citizens, and shall be subject to like punishment, pains, penalties, taxes, licenses, and exactions of every kind, and to no other.

Subsequently, on April 28, 1866, the Joint Committee of Fifteen voted in favor of a second draft proposed by Congressman Bingham, which would ultimately be adopted into the Constitution. The Joint Committee no longer tracked the existing language in Article Four as the Committee had previously done. On May 10, 1866, in the closing debate on the House floor, Bingham nevertheless quoted Article IV:

Contrary to the express letter of your Constitution, cruel and unusual punishments have been inflicted under State laws within this Union upon citizens, not only for crimes committed, but for sacred duty done, for which and against which the Government of the United States had provided no remedy and could provide none. Sir, the words of the Constitution that 'the citizens of each State shall be entitled to all the privileges and immunities of citizens in the several states' include, among other privileges, the right to bear true allegiance to the Constitution and the laws of the United States, and to be protected in life, liberty, and property.

The Fourteenth Amendment was approved by the House later that day. Michigan Senator Jacob M. Howard introduced the amendment in the Senate, and gave a speech in which he discussed the meaning of this clause. Howard noted that the U.S. Supreme Court had never squarely addressed the meaning of the Privileges and Immunities Clause in Article IV, which therefore made the effect of the new Privileges or Immunities Clause somewhat uncertain.

Congress gave final approval to the Privileges or Immunities Clause when the House proposed the Fourteenth Amendment to the states for ratification on June 13, 1866. There was much discussion of this proposed clause as the amendment awaited ratification by the states. For example, according to a November 15, 1866 pseudonymous letter published in the New York Times:

"[N]o State shall make or enforce any law which shall abridge the privileges or immunities of citizens of the United States." This is intended for the enforcement of the Second Section of the Fourth Article of the Constitution, which declares that "the citizens of each State shall be entitled to all the privileges and immunities of the citizens in the several States.

We have seen, in the first number, what privileges and immunities were intended. The same authorities have held that the negro of African descent was not a citizen within the meaning of the term, as used in this and other articles of the Constitution; that he was not one of the "peoples" who ordained that sacred charter; that as a slave he was only three-fifth of a "number," but as a free man he was a whole number to be counted for representation, and a whole "person," who might be held to involuntary "service," and reclaimed in any State to which he might escape. The free colored man could have no protection in any slave State during the existence of the relation of master and slave.

He could not change his residence, nor travel at pleasure; he could neither buy, sell nor hold property; he was liable to be enslaved under various circumstances, and such laws were often enforced. Those who contend for "the Constitution as it is and the Union as it was," affect to acknowledge the freedom of the colored people; but, by a series of unfriendly legislation, many of the states construe that freedom to mean no acknowledgment of citizenship and the enjoyment of very few rights. Without enumerating the disgraceful particulars of legislation, it must be apparent to every candid mind, that the Constitution must be so amended as to place restrictions upon the States, or else the Negro must be virtually reenslaved.

The clause, together with the rest of the Fourteenth Amendment, became part of the Constitution in July 1868.

== Interpretation after adoption ==
Many judges and scholars have interpreted this clause, and the Slaughter-House Cases decided in 1873 have thus far been the most influential.

=== Pre-Slaughter-House ===
On January 30, 1871, the House Judiciary Committee, led by John Bingham, released a House Report No. 22, which was authored by Bingham himself, interpreting the Fourteenth's privileges or immunities this way (Emphasis added):

The clause of the Fourteenth Amendment, "No State shall make or enforce any law which shall abridge the privileges or immunities of citizens of the United States," does not, in the opinion of the committee, refer to privileges and immunities of citizens of the United States other than those privileges and immunities embraced in the original text of the Constitution, article four, section two. The Fourteenth Amendment, it is believed, did not add to the privileges or immunities before mentioned, but was deemed necessary for the enforcement as an express limitation upon the powers of the States. It had been judicially determined that the first Eight Amendments of the Constitution were not limitations on the power of the States, and it was apprehended that the same might be held of the provision of the second section, fourth article.

Shortly thereafter, on March 31, 1871, Bingham elaborated:

I hope the gentleman now knows why I changed the form of the amendment of February, 1866. Mr. Speaker, that the scope and meaning of the limitations imposed by the first section, fourteenth amendment of the Constitution may be more fully understood, permit me to say that the privileges and immunities of citizens of the United States, as contradistinguished from citizens of a State, are chiefly defined in the first eight amendments to the Constitution of the United States.

One of the earliest judicial interpretations of the Privileges or Immunities Clause was Garnes v. McCann, Ohio Sup. Ct., in 1871. In it Judge John Day interpreted the clause to protect enumerated constitutional rights such as those listed in the Bill of Rights, but not unenumerated common-law civil rights. He wrote:

This [case] involves the equity as to what privileges or immunities are embraced in the inhibition of this clause. We are not aware that this has been as yet judicially settled. The language of the clause, however, taken in connection with other provisions of the amendment, and of the constitution of which it forms a part, affords strong reasons for believing that it includes only such privileges or immunities as are derived from, or recognized by, the constitution of the United States. A broader interpretation opens into a field of conjecture limitless as the range of speculative theories, and might work such limitations of the power of the States to manage and regulate their local institutions and affairs as were never contemplated by the amendment.

=== The Slaughter-House Cases ===
The Privileges or Immunities Clause of the Fourteenth Amendment to the United States Constitution is unique among constitutional provisions in that some scholars believe it was substantially read out of the Constitution in a 5–4 decision of the Supreme Court in the Slaughter-House Cases of 1873. The Clause has remained virtually dormant since, but in 2010 this clause was the basis for the fifth and deciding vote in the case of McDonald v. Chicago, regarding application of the Second Amendment of the United States Constitution to the states.

In the Slaughter-House Cases the court recognized two types of citizenship. The rights citizens have by being citizens of the United States are covered under the Privileges or Immunities Clause of the 14th Amendment, while the rights citizens have by being citizens of a state fall under the Privileges and Immunities Clause of Article Four.

The Supreme Court did not prevent application of the Bill of Rights to the states via the Privileges or Immunities Clause in Slaughter-House, but rather addressed whether a state monopoly statute violated the natural right of a person to do business and engage in his trade or vocation. In other words, no provision of the Bill of Rights was at issue in that case, nor was any other right that followed under the U.S. Constitution.

In obiter dicta, Justice Miller's opinion in Slaughter-House went so far as to acknowledge that the privileges or immunities of a citizen of the United States include at least two rights listed in the first eight amendments: "The right to peaceably assemble and petition for redress of grievances ... are rights of the citizen guaranteed by the Federal Constitution". Otherwise Miller mentioned a number of often highly specific, and seemingly random, rights supposedly tied to U.S. citizenship including "the right of free access... to the sub-treasuries". The Privileges or Immunities Clause was perhaps originally intended to incorporate the first eight amendments of the Bill of Rights against the state governments, while also incorporating other constitutional rights against the state governments such as the privilege of the writ of habeas corpus. However, that incorporation has instead been justified rhetorically in decisions mostly by means of the Due Process Clause of the Fourteenth Amendment.

=== Post-Slaughter-House ===
In the 1947 case of Adamson v. California, Supreme Court Justice Hugo Black argued in his dissent that the framers intended the Privileges or Immunities Clause to apply the Bill of Rights against the states. Black argued that the framers' intent should control the Court's interpretation of the 14th Amendment, and he attached a lengthy appendix that quoted extensively from John Bingham's congressional statements. However, Black's position on the Privileges or Immunities Clause fell one vote short of a majority in the Adamson case.

In the 1948 case of Oyama v. California, a majority of the Court found that California had violated Fred Oyama's right to own land, a privilege of citizens of the United States.

Legal scholars disagree about the precise meaning of the Privileges or Immunities Clause, although there are some aspects that are less controversial than others. William Van Alstyne has characterized the coverage of the Privileges or Immunities Clause this way:

Each [citizen] was given the same constitutional immunity from abridging acts of state government as each was already recognized to possess from abridgment by Congress. What was previously forbidden only to Congress to do was, by the passage of the Fourteenth Amendment, made equally forbidden to any state.

Roger Pilon of the Cato Institute has said that the meaning of the Privileges or Immunities Clause of the Fourteenth Amendment depends upon the meaning of its counterpart in Article IV: the Privileges and Immunities Clause. Pilon further urges that the Article IV Clause should be reinterpreted as protecting a wide variety of natural rights, despite "its more recent history of interpretation or enforcement".

On the other hand, Kurt Lash of the University of Richmond School of Law has argued that, at the time of the adoption of the Fourteenth Amendment, the privileges and immunities of "citizens of the United States" as referred to in the Fourteenth Amendment were understood as a class distinct from the privileges and immunities of "Citizens in the several States" as referred to in Article IV. Under this interpretation of the Privileges or Immunities Clause as an "antebellum term of art", Slaughter-House is consistent with the original meaning of the Fourteenth Amendment.

Like Roger Pilon, some of the framers of the Privileges or Immunities Clause anticipated that it could protect (from state infringement) a broad range of rights far exceeding what had been enumerated in the Bill of Rights. However, as Pilon notes, that was often because of their interpretation of the Privileges and Immunities Clause in the original unamended Constitution. Regarding that interpretation of the older clause, Justice Clarence Thomas has noted that the framers of the Fourteenth Amendment realized the Supreme Court had not yet "undertaken to define either the nature or extent of the privileges and immunities" in the original unamended Constitution. The framers of the Fourteenth Amendment left that matter of interpretation in the hands of the judiciary.

In the 2010 case of McDonald v. Chicago, Justice Thomas, while concurring with the majority in declaring the Second Amendment applicable to state and local governments, declared that he had reached the same conclusion only through the Privileges or Immunities Clause. Legal scholar Randy Barnett argues that since no other justice, either in majority or dissent, attempted to question his rationale, this constitutes a revival of the Privileges or Immunities Clause. In the 2019 case of Timbs v. Indiana where the court incorporated the Eighth Amendment's protection against excessive fines against state governments, Justice Thomas again argued in a concurrence that the right should have been incorporated via the Privileges or Immunities Clause. Justice Gorsuch also agreed in a separate concurrence that the Privileges or Immunities Clause "may well [have been] the appropriate vehicle for incorporation" In the 2020 case of Ramos v. Louisiana, Justice Thomas again argued in favor of the Privileges or Immunities Clause rather than the Due Process Clause.

== Redundancy issues ==
One of the arguments against interpreting the Privileges or Immunities Clause as a requirement that the states comply with the Bill of Rights has been that such an interpretation would render the Due Process Clause of the Fourteenth Amendment redundant, due to the Fifth Amendment's Due Process Clause.

Although constitutional scholars such as Raoul Berger have raised this question, Akhil Amar argues that the framers of the Fourteenth Amendment wanted to extend the due process right not only to citizens, but to all other persons as well, which required a separate Due Process Clause. The Fifth Amendment refers to "persons" and not "citizens" within its text, but it would only be incorporated by the Privileges or Immunities Clause as to citizens. An alternative or additional rationale for explicitly including the Due Process Clause in the Fourteenth Amendment is that the Privileges or Immunities Clause only forbids states from making or enforcing laws, and therefore does not bar states from harming people outside the legal process.

Another redundancy issue is posed by an interpretation of the Privileges or Immunities Clause that views it as simply a guarantee of equality. Proponents of that interpretation acknowledge that, "the natural response to this approach is to say that ... any equality-based reading of the clause is redundant because the Equal Protection Clause provides the necessary ground and more".

== Right to travel ==
The right of citizens to travel from one state to another was already considered to be protected by the Privileges and Immunities Clause of the original, unamended Constitution. For example, in Dred Scott v. Sandford, the Supreme Court listed a number of rights of citizens which "it cannot be supposed that [the founders] intended to secure" for free black people, one of which was "the right to enter any other State whenever they pleased." Moreover, the right to travel has additional components, such as the right to take up residence and become a citizen of a different state. The Fourteenth Amendment's Citizenship Clause addresses residency: "All persons born or naturalized in the United States, and subject to the jurisdiction thereof, are citizens of the United States and of the State wherein they reside."

In the 1999 case of Saenz v. Roe, Justice John Paul Stevens, writing for the majority, said that the "right to travel" also has a component protected by the Privileges or Immunities Clause of the Fourteenth Amendment:

Despite fundamentally differing views concerning the coverage of the Privileges or Immunities Clause of the Fourteenth Amendment, most notably expressed in the majority and dissenting opinions in the Slaughter-House Cases (1873), it has always been common ground that this Clause protects the third component of the right to travel. Writing for the majority in the Slaughter-House Cases, Justice Miller explained that one of the privileges conferred by this Clause "is that a citizen of the United States can, of his own volition, become a citizen of any State of the Union by a bona fide residence therein, with the same rights as other citizens of that State."

Justice Samuel Freeman Miller had written in the Slaughter-House Cases that the right to become a citizen of a state by residing in the state "is conferred by the very article under consideration".

== See also ==
- Privileges and Immunities Clause
- Oyama v. California, 332 U.S. 633 (1948).
- McDonald v. Chicago, 561 U.S. 742 (2010) (Justice Thomas' concurrence)
- Timbs v. Indiana, 586 U.S. _ (2019) (Justice Thomas' and Justice Gorsuch's concurrences)
- Ramos v. Louisiana, 590 U.S. _ (2020) (Justice Thomas' concurrence)
