= Paul v. Virginia =

- Supreme Court of the United States

Argued October 8, 12, 1869 Decided November 1, 1869
- Full case name: Samuel Paul v. Virginia
- Citations: 75 U.S. 168 (more) 8 Wall. 168; 19 L. Ed. 357; 1868 U.S. LEXIS 1092

Holding
- 1. A corporation is not a citizen within the meaning of the Privileges and Immunities Clause. 2. Congress has no power to regulate insurance under the Commerce Clause.

Court membership
- Chief Justice Salmon P. Chase Associate Justices Samuel Nelson · Robert C. Grier; Nathan Clifford · Noah H. Swayne; Samuel F. Miller · David Davis; Stephen J. Field

Case opinion
- Majority: Field, joined by unanimous

Laws applied
- U.S. Const. Art. I, § 8. and U.S. Const. Art. IV, § 2
- Overruled by
- United States v. South-Eastern Underwriters Ass'n (1944) (in part)

Paul v. Virginia, 75 U.S. (8 Wall.) 168 (1869), is a U.S. corporate law decision by the United States Supreme Court. It held that a corporation is not a citizen within the meaning of the Privileges and Immunities Clause. Of greater consequence, the Court further held that "issuing a policy of insurance is not a transaction of commerce," effectively removing the business of insurance beyond the United States Congress's legislative reach (until partially overturned in United States v. South-Eastern Underwriters Association).

== Facts ==
In the 19th century, the insurance business was exclusively regulated by the states, individually. As a result, a patchwork of separate regulations proliferated to the dismay of insurance companies which sought uniform regulation across states. In an effort to promote federal regulation of the insurance industry, a number of New York insurance companies orchestrated a test case to try to invalidate state regulation. On February 3, 1866, the legislature of Virginia had passed a statute provided that an insurance company not incorporated under the laws of the state should not carry on its business within the State without previously obtaining a license for that purpose and that it should not receive such license until it had deposited with the treasurer of the state bonds in an amount varying from thirty to fifty thousand dollars.

In May 1866, Samuel Paul, a resident of the Commonwealth of Virginia, was appointed the agent of the New York insurance companies, to carry on the general business of insurance against fire. He then applied for a license to act as such agent within the state, offering at the time to comply with all the requirements of the statute with the exception of the provision requiring a deposit of bonds with the treasurer of the state. Based on his failure to comply with the requirements of the statute, the license was refused. Notwithstanding this refusal he undertook to act in the State as agent for the New York companies without any license.

Paul sold a fire insurance policy to a citizen of Virginia. He was then indicted and convicted in the Circuit Court of the city of Petersburg, and was sentenced to pay a fine of $50. Paul claimed that the statute was invalid.

== Judgment ==
=== Supreme Court of Virginia ===
The Supreme Court of Appeals of the State, the judgment was affirmed, and the case was then appealed to the Supreme Court. Paul claimed that the writ of error on the judgment in the lower court violated Privileges and Immunities Clause, which provides that "The Citizens of each State shall be entitled to all Privileges and Immunities of Citizens in the several States" and the Commerce Clause, which empowers Congress "to regulate commerce with foreign nations, and among the several States."

=== Supreme Court of the United States ===
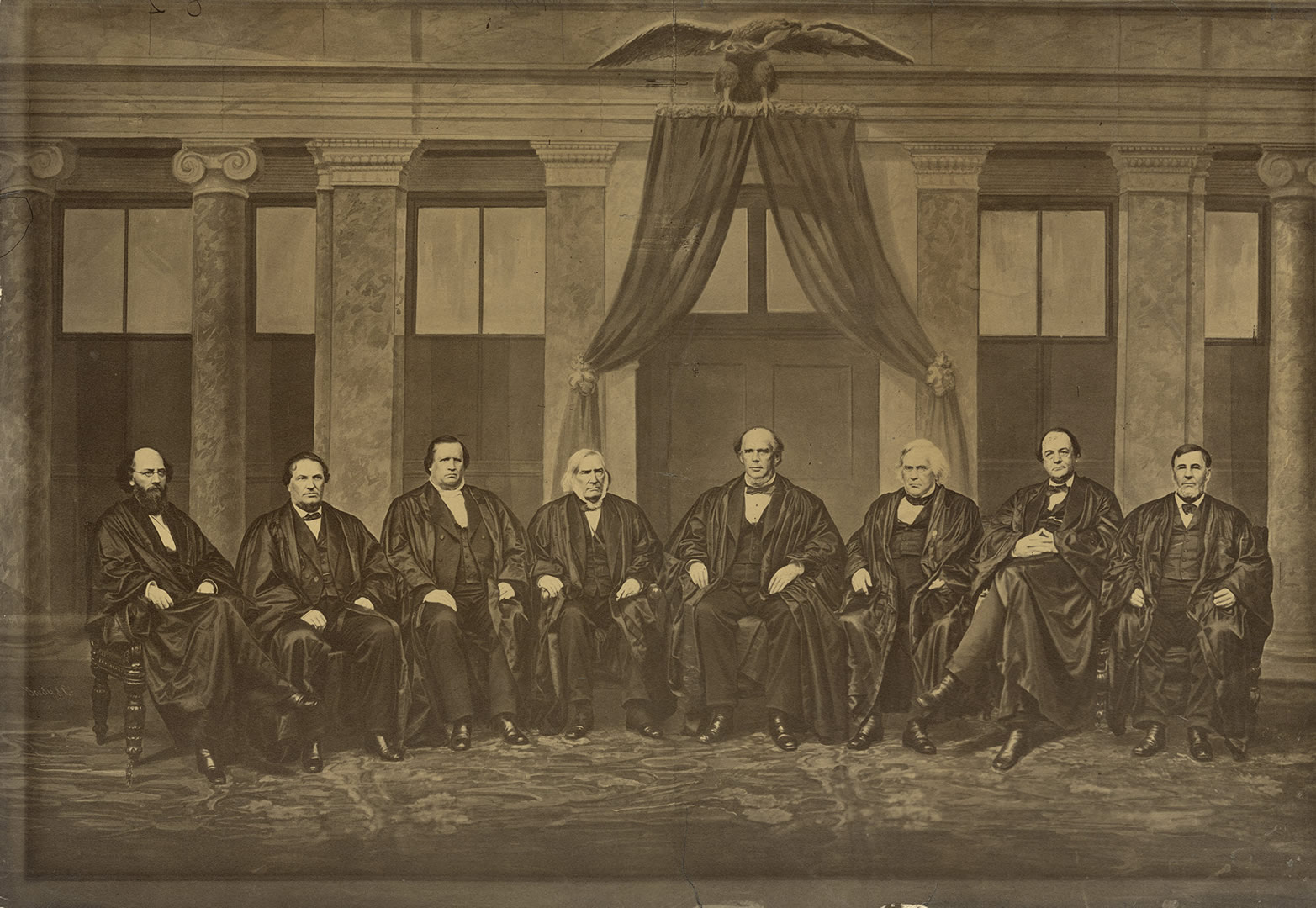
The Chase Court as of 1869.

The US Supreme Court held that a corporation is not a citizen within the meaning of the Privileges and Immunities Clause. A corporation has a right to operate in states where it is not incorporated where that state allows it to. It also held that "issuing a policy of insurance is not a transaction of commerce," effectively removing the business of insurance beyond the United States Congress's legislative reach.

The recognition of its existence even by other states, and the enforcement of its contracts made therein, depend purely upon the comity of those states; a comity which is never extended where the existence of the corporation or the exercise of its powers, are prejudicial to their interests, or repugnant to their policy. Having no absolute right of recognition in other states, but depending for such recognition and the enforcement of its contracts upon their consent, it follows as a matter of course that such consent may be granted upon such terms and conditions as those states may think proper to impose. They may exclude the foreign corporation entirely; they may restrict its business to particular localities; or they may exact such security for the performance of its contracts with their citizens as in their judgment will best promote the public interests. The whole matter rests in their discretion.

== Significance ==
In 1944, the Supreme Court overturned the holding of Paul v. Virginia in United States v. South-Eastern Underwriters Ass'n, finding that insurance transactions were subject to federal regulation under the Commerce Clause.

== See also ==
- US corporate law
- Legal person
- Insurance law
