= Eunique v. Powell =

U.S. Supreme Court case

- Court: United States Court of Appeals for the Ninth Circuit
- Full case name: Eudene Eunique v. Colin L. Powell
- Argued: September 14, 2001
- Decided: February 22, 2002
- Citation: 281 F.3d 940 (9th Cir. 2002)

Court membership
- Judges sitting: Ferdinand Francis Fernandez, Andrew J. Kleinfeld, M. Margaret McKeown

Case opinions
- Majority: Fernandez
- Concurrence: McKeown
- Dissent: Kleinfeld

Laws applied
- 42 U.S.C. § 652(k)

Eunique v. Powell, 281 F.3d 940 (9th Cir. 2002), challenging passport denial for child support arrearage under 42 U.S.C. § 652(k) and enacted as part of the Personal Responsibility and Work Opportunity Act in 1996, is the second cornerstone of the Court's thinking on passport denial/revocation under this law.

== Case ==
Eudene Eunique, a lawyer, applied for a passport in 1998 for business and to visit a sister in Mexico. She was denied because she owed more than $5,000 in child support. Fifteen days later, she brought a pro se action for declaratory and injunctive relief on the theory that 42 U.S.C. § 652(k); 22 C.F.R. § 51.70(a)(8) unconstitutionally limited her Fifth Amendment right to travel. Eunique's arguments were narrowly drawn: essentially, that there is an insufficient connection between her breach of the duty to pay for the support of her children and the government's interference with her right to international travel. She did not seek monetary damages.

The district considered exhaustion, ripeness and constitutionality in its opinion. It granted a summary judgment against her, ruling that administrative remedies were not available to Eunique and thus she was not required to exhaust what was not available. Concerning ripeness, it ruled that since Eunique was only challenging the constitutionality of 42 U.S.C. § 652(k); 22 C.F.R. § 51.70(a)(8) and the issues in the case were purely legal, they were fit for review. Because Eunique had already been denied a passport, she had suffered sufficient hardship to warrant judicial review. On constitutionality, it ruled that her right to travel was not a fundamental right. It held that enforcing child-support orders was a legitimate and important state interest, and that the law need not be narrowly tailored to achieve this purpose. Eunique appealed.

== Decision ==
The United States Court of Appeals for the Ninth Circuit affirmed, with the Court divided over scrutiny due the right to international travel. Judge Ferdinand F. Fernadez held that the government only need have a rational basis for imposing the ban, citing Kent v. Dulles 357 U.S. 116, Haig v. Agee 453 U.S. 280, Zemel v. Rusk 381 U.S. 1, Aptheker v. Sec'y of State 378 U.S. 500, Califano v. Aznavorian 439 U.S. 170, Freedom to Travel Campaign v. Newcomb, 82 F.3d 1431, and Weinstein v. Albright. It held that, without violating Eunique's Fifth Amendment freedom to travel internationally, Congress (and the State Department) could refuse to let her have a passport as long as she remained in substantial arrears on her child-support obligations and the Constitution did not require that she be given a passport at this time.

== Majority opinion ==
The court first pointed out that the right to travel was not fundamental and could be regulated within the bounds of due process, citing Haig v. Agee. Thus, the court did not apply strict scrutiny to restrictions on international travel rights that did not implicate First Amendment concerns. Justice Fernandez opined that the Supreme Court suggested that rational basis review should be applied, distinguishing Aptheker v. Secretary of State (on First Amendment concerns) from Haig and Zemel v. Rusk. While recognizing that Califano v. Aznavorian did not directly apply because it did not directly regulate passports, it and Haig supported that the more restrictive form of review did not apply. He also cited Ninth Circuit precedent in Freedom to Travel Campaign v. Newcomb, 82 F.3d 1431, and District of Columbia Circuit in Hutchins v. Dist. of Columbia, 188 F.3d 531, to support rational basis review, despite its own precedent in Causey v. Pan Am. World Airways (In re Aircrash in Bali, Indonesia on April 22, 1974), 684 F.2d 1301, 1309-10 (9th Cir. 1982) in which it indicated that international travel was a fundamental right.

He found the statute constitutional because there was a "'reasonable fit’ between governmental purpose...and the means chosen to advance that purpose”, citing Reno v. Flores, 507 U.S. 292 (1993) and that “it is rationally related to a legitimate government interest,” citing Rodriguez v. Cook, 169 F.3d 1176 (9th Cir. 1999). The failure of parents to support their children was recognized by society as a serious offense against morals and welfare. Economic problems caused by parents who fail to provide economic support for their children were so serious that it was not deterred by the argument in United States v. Mussari, 95 F.3d 787 (9th Cir. 1996) that Congress was seeking to regulate a “fundamental familial relation” when it upheld the constitutionality of the Child Support Recovery Act of 1992, 18 U.S.C. § 228 (which criminalizes the failure of an out-of-state parent to pay child support). He noted that the impetus for enactment of 42 USC 652(k) was that unsupported children must often look to the federal treasury for financial sustenance. This illustrated the rationality of Congress's goal, and also demonstrated its rational connection to the passport denial in question. It made sense to assure that those who do not pay child-support obligations remain within the country, where they can be reached by our processes in a relatively easy way.

He went on to speculate that a person who failed to pay child support might attempt to escape the law by going abroad and might even violate the laws of the United States, citing Kent regarding the longstanding policy to deny passports for these reasons. He noted that if a parent (like Eunique) truly wished to partake of the joys and benefits of international travel, § 652(k) had the effect of focusing that person's mind on a more important concern—the need to support one's children first. Finally he recognized that Freedom to Travel alluded to the possibility that passport restraints may require an “important” reason (intermediate scrutiny) for imposing a travel ban, but that the restriction in question both fostered and was substantially related to an important governmental interest—thus securing Judge McKeown's concurrence.

== Concurrence ==
Judge M. Margaret McKeown held that laws restricting the right to international travel should be subject to intermediate scrutiny, but concurred because the law in this case met that test. Judge McKeown cited Califano v. Aznavorian to support her view that intermediate scrutiny came the closest to being the proper standard, when First Amendment concerns were not implicated.

The restriction imposed here was carefully considered and should be upheld, because securing the payment of child support for minor children was both an important and substantial government interest. Simply paying the support would not implicate any of Eunique's First Amendment or other fundamental rights. The procedure for state certification to the federal government of delinquent child support apparently provided regulatory safe harbor, permitted waiver of the restriction for business purposes and family emergencies and (although this safe harbor derived from state law) the federal statute was predicated on state certification of child support delinquency provided in accordance with federal law.

Judge McKeown then engaged in a survey of precedent in right to international travel cases. She distinguished Kent, Aptheker, and Zemel, concluding that the Court had held that the right to international travel could be regulated within the bounds of due process, and that “legislation which is said to infringe on the freedom to travel abroad is not to be judged by the same standard applied to laws that penalize the right of interstate travel”. Laws which had an “incidental effect on a protected liberty” need only be “rationally based”. She tied these together with Haig: “[t]he freedom to travel abroad...is subordinate to national security and foreign policy consideration; as such, it is subject to reasonable government regulation” and that the higher standard applied in Aptheker and Kent involved beliefs rather than conduct. (“The protection accorded beliefs standing alone is very different from the protection accorded conduct.”).

She then reviewed Ninth Circuit precedent in Causey and Freedom to Travel, concluding that although Causey used the phrase “fundamental right” in referencing international travel, it stated that “[r]estrictions on international travel...must be carefully tailored to serve a substantial and legitimate government interest”; it might be more appropriately characterized as something less than strict scrutiny and more akin to intermediate scrutiny. Although Freedom to Travel equivocated that the proper test is rational basis or, at most, intermediate scrutiny: “[g]iven the lesser importance of this freedom to travel abroad, the Government need only advance a rational, or at most an important, reason for [restricting international travel], ”[b]y using the terms 'important' and 'substantial' interest". Freedom to Travel also mirrored Causey’s language of a “substantial” reason, thus easily supporting an intermediate scrutiny standard.

== Dissent ==
In a dissenting opinion, Judge Andrew J. Kleinfeld (citing the same cases) reached a different conclusion, holding that the law should be subject to strict scrutiny. He argued that the law should be overturned under Aptheker, arguing that it "is less constitutionally defensible than the ban on passports for Communists held unconstitutional in Aptheker" and that it "is also overbroad because, as in Aptheker, it does not take into account individual reasons that might support a passport."

Judge Kleinfeld noted that the three pigeonholes (rational basis, intermediate and strict scrutiny) postdate the principles laid down by the Supreme Court governing this case. Unlike those cases in which the Supreme Court upheld restrictions on travel, in this case the government had not offered a foreign policy or national security justification for the restriction, the government had not narrowly tailored the restriction to its purpose, and the apparent purpose of the restriction was to penalize past misconduct rather than to restrict travel as such. He then cited Socrates in Crito, the Magna Carta, Kent and the Jackson–Vanik amendment (the right to emigrate as “fundamental”) for the proposition that the right to leave is among the most important of all human rights.

He noted that the Supreme Court had dealt with three kinds of interference with the right to travel abroad: bans on travel by specific classes of persons; bans on travel to specific countries; and residency requirements for government benefits that incidentally burden persons who travel abroad. The Court held that incidental burdens on permitted travel need only have a rational basis, but subjected restrictions on travel itself to much greater scrutiny. The Court had not formally stated the constitutional test, but its elements were clear. Travel restrictions must be justified by an important or compelling government interest, and must be narrowly tailored to that end. Travel bans aimed at specific individuals (or classes of individuals) must be more narrowly tailored than bans aimed at specific countries. The statute and regulation in this case imposed a direct restriction on travel, rather than an incidental burden, and must meet a higher standard of scrutiny than rational basis. Nor were the restrictions area restrictions, as in Zemel and Regan v. Wald. Nor were the restrictions based on national security or foreign policy, as in Haig. Nor was this a ban on travel by people “participating in illegal conduct, trying to escape the toils of the law, promoting passport frauds, or otherwise engaging in conduct which would violate the laws of the United States”, because the statute and regulation in this case only require that she be a debtor (not a fugitive).

Judge Kleinfeld argued that the district court should be reversed under Aptheker because neither the majority nor the concurring opinion could distinguish Aptheker on First Amendment grounds. In Aptheker the Court expressly held that its disposition of the case under the Fifth Amendment made it unnecessary to review the First Amendment contentions. The Court described the right to travel abroad as one of our “basic freedoms" and held that ”the statute was “unconstitutional on its face” because it swept “too widely and too indiscriminately across the liberty guaranteed in the Fifth Amendment”. The ban was too “tenuous” in its relationship to national security concerns to justify its breadth and “indiscriminately” ignored such “plainly relevant” factors as “the individual’s knowledge, activity, commitment, and purposes in and places for travel.” Since Magna Carta, national security concerns have justified limiting the right to travel outside the country. In Aptheker, there was a genuine national security concern but the statute swept too broadly, embracing cases where that concern was highly attenuated. For parents in arrears on child support, there is no national security or foreign policy concern.

Nor did Zemel support the travel restrictions in this case because Zemel involved the “weightiest considerations of national security” and involved travel to a particular hostile country. The case at bar was thus more like Kent than Zemel because the statute and regulation prohibited Ms. Eunique from traveling out of the United States based on her debtor status (a “characteristic peculiar” to her), rather than “foreign policy considerations affecting all citizens.” Nor did Aznavorian; the Court in Aznavorian explicitly distinguished passport restrictions from the “rational basis” review it gave the suspension of government benefits while abroad, noting that the law at issue “does not limit the availability or validity of passports”. Similarly, neither Haig nor Regan supported the ban. Haig upheld the application of a regulation narrowly tailored to “cases involving likelihood of ‘serious damage’ to national security or foreign policy" and Regan upheld a narrowly tailored travel restriction that supported the government's important foreign policy and national security interests. None of these recognized a “First Amendment exception” to rule of rational basis review for travel restrictions.

Judge Kleinfeld held the law overbroad because it did not actually require people to remain in the country (as the majority had asserted) and it did not facilitate collection, but instead acted as a penalty for past nonpayment. It also did not take into account individual reasons that might support a passport, and it did not allow for considerations that would bear on the risk of a person traveling abroad to evade child support obligations. He dismissed Judge McKeown's reference to a procedure instituted by the California state agency responsible for child support collections by which parents in arrears may (based on “extenuating circumstances”) request removal from the delinquency list sent to the federal government and used to deny passports, because that possible remedy was a creature of state law and irrelevant to whether the federal law at issue in this case is narrowly tailored.

He held the court should reverse because the right to leave one's country is too important to let the government take it away as punishment to advance a government policy just because it is important. The other two opinions would evidently allow passport refusal for non-payment of tax arrears, drunk-driving convictions, or failure to obey a summons for jury service; this weighed our liberty too lightly.

== See also ==
- Kent v. Dulles: U.S. Supreme Court case involving withholding passports based on political affiliation
