= Califano v. Aznavorian =

- Supreme Court of the United States

Argued November 6, 1978 Decided December 11, 1978
- Full case name: Califano, Secretary of Health, Education, and Welfare v. Aznavorian
- Citations: 439 U.S. 170 (more) 99 S. Ct. 471; 58 L. Ed. 2d 435, 1978 U.S. LEXIS 143

Case history
- Prior: 440 F. Supp. 788 (S.D. Cal. 1977); probable jurisdiction noted, 435 U.S. 921 (1978).

Holding
- Section 1611(f) of the Social Security Act held to be constitutional as having a rational basis and does not impose an impermissible burden on the freedom of international travel in violation of the Fifth Amendment.

Court membership
- Chief Justice Warren E. Burger Associate Justices William J. Brennan Jr. · Potter Stewart; Byron White · Thurgood Marshall; Harry Blackmun · Lewis F. Powell Jr. William Rehnquist · John P. Stevens

Case opinions
- Majority: Stewart, joined by Burger, White, Blackmun, Powell, Rehnquist, Stevens
- Concurrence: Marshall (in judgment), joined by Brennan

Laws applied
- U.S. Const. amend. V

Califano v. Aznavorian, 439 U.S. 170 (1978), was a United States Supreme Court case involving denial of Social Security Benefits to recipients while they are abroad and the Fifth Amendment due process right to international travel.

== Background ==
The Supplemental Security Income (SSI) program was enacted by Congress in 1972 to aid needy aged, blind, and disabled people. The legislation stipulated that the recipient would not receive benefits for any month spent entirely outside the United States. Grace Aznavorian was an American citizen and a resident of California in 1974, and was eligible recipient of SSI benefits. On July 21, 1974, she left the United States, traveled to Mexico, and was unable to return to the United States until September 1, 1974. She did not receive benefits for August or September.

Aznavorian pursued administrative remedies without success before filing suit in the United States District Court for the Southern District of California, seeking judicial review of an administrative agency's decision. She moved for certification of a plaintiff class including all persons denied SSI benefits because of international travel. The District Court certified the class, concluding that a class action was not barred by the Social Security Act, because the class would be limited to those who had presented unsuccessful claims to the Secretary. The District Court granted summary judgment for the plaintiff's class. The Secretary appealed to the Ninth Circuit.

== Opinion of the Court ==
Justice Stewart delivered the opinion of the Court, holding, without dissent, that Section 1611(f) of the Social Security Act was constitutional because it had a rational basis and did not impose an impermissible burden on the freedom of international travel in violation of the Fifth Amendment because the section merely had an incidental effect on international travel, (distinguishing Kent v. Dulles, Aptheker v. Secretary of State, and Zemel v. Rusk). The Court found the challenged statute to be entitled to a strong presumption of constitutionality, citing Mathews v. de Castro, and that the Court had consistently upheld the constitutionality of arbitrary classifications in federal welfare legislation where a rational basis existed for Congress' choice. The section clearly effectuated the basic congressional decision to limit SSI payments to residents of the United States. Moreover, § 1611(f) might have represented Congress' decision simply to limit payments to those who need them in the United States. While these justifications for the legislation might not have been compelling, its constitutionality, in contrast to the standard applied to laws that penalize the right of interstate travel, did not depend on compelling justifications.

The Court rejected Aznavorian's assertion that because the statutory provision of § 1611(f)limits the freedom of international travel, a more stringent standard must be applied in its constitutional appraisal. The Court noted that legislation providing governmental payments of monetary benefits here had an incidental effect on a protected liberty and it did not have nearly so direct an impact on the freedom to travel internationally as occurred in the Kent, Aptheker, or Zemel. It did not limit the availability or validity of passports and it did not limit the right to travel on grounds that may be in tension with the First Amendment. It merely withdrew a governmental benefit during and shortly after an extended absence from this country. Unless the limitation imposed by Congress is wholly irrational, it was constitutional in spite of its incidental effect on international travel.

Moreover, the Court held that Congress may simply have decided to limit payments to those who need them in the United States. The needs to which this program responded might vary dramatically in foreign countries and the Social Security Administration would be hard pressed to monitor the continuing eligibility of persons outside the country. Congress may only have wanted to increase the likelihood that these funds would be spent inside the United States. These justifications for the legislation in question were not, perhaps, compelling. But its constitutionality did not depend on compelling justifications. The Court held that it was enough if the provision was rationally based, citing Dandridge v. Williams.

=== Concurrence ===
Justice Marshall and Justice Brennan, concurring in the result, but pointed out that sustaining classifications in welfare legislation that are "arbitrary," so long as they are not "wholly irrational" would be inconsistent with the settled principle that the "standard by which [welfare] legislation . . . must be judged 'is not a toothless one,'" citing Mathews v. de Castro. Therefore, they did not understand the Court to imply that welfare legislation not involving a fundamental interest or suspect classification is subject to a lesser standard of review than the traditional rational basis test.

== See also ==
- Kent v. Dulles
