= Haig v. Agee =

- Supreme Court of the United States

Argued January 14, 1981 Decided June 29, 1981
- Full case name: Haig, Secretary of State v. Philip Agee
- Citations: 453 U.S. 280 (more) 101 S. Ct. 2766; 69 L. Ed. 2d 640; 1981 U.S. LEXIS 39; 49 U.S.L.W. 4869; 7 Media L. Rep. 1545

Holding
- The Passport Act of 1926 granted the Executive the power to revoke a passport when necessary for national security. Constitutional protections on due process right to travel are subordinate to national security and foreign policy considerations and subject to reasonable government regulation. Revocation of passport here acted as inhibition of action rather than inhibition of speech. Prerevocation hearings are not required in cases involving discernible adverse effects on the nation's security.

Court membership
- Chief Justice Warren E. Burger Associate Justices William J. Brennan Jr. · Potter Stewart; Byron White · Thurgood Marshall; Harry Blackmun · Lewis F. Powell Jr. William Rehnquist · John P. Stevens

Case opinions
- Majority: Burger, joined by Stewart, White, Blackmun, Powell, Rehnquist, Stevens
- Concurrence: Blackmun
- Dissent: Brennan, joined by Marshall

Laws applied
- U.S. Const. amend. V, Passport Act of 1926

Haig v. Agee, 453 U.S. 280 (1981), was a United States Supreme Court case that upheld the right of the executive branch to revoke a citizen's passport for reasons of national security and the foreign policy interests of the U.S. under the Passport Act of 1926.

The case involved Congressional delegation of authority over control of passports and the right to international travel. Philip Agee was an ex-Central Intelligence Agency (CIA) officer living overseas who in 1974 declared a "campaign to fight the U.S. CIA wherever it is operating" and revealed the identities of several CIA officers resulting in violence against them. The Secretary of State revoked Agee's passport in 1979. Agee sued, alleging the secretary had no such authority, had denied him procedural due process rights, his substantive due process "liberty" right to travel under the Fifth Amendment, and had violated his First Amendment right to criticize government policies.

The district court found the Secretary lacked the power to revoke the passport and the Court of Appeals for the District of Columbia affirmed that decision. The Supreme Court reversed the lower court, holding that the broad discretion accorded the executive branch in matters of national security and foreign policy requires that the Passport Act of 1926 (currently codified at 22 U.S.C. § 211a et seq.) should be interpreted as granting the power to revoke a passport when necessary for national security.

== Facts of the case ==
Philip Agee, an American citizen, was employed by the Central Intelligence Agency from 1957 to 1968, holding key positions in the division of the Agency responsible for covert intelligence gathering in foreign countries. In 1974, Agee announced in London that he was launching a "campaign to fight the United States CIA wherever it is operating" and intended "to expose CIA officers and agents and to take the measures necessary to drive them out of the countries where they are operating." Agee and his collaborators repeatedly and publicly identified individuals and organizations in foreign countries as undercover CIA agents, employees, or sources. They divulged classified information, violated Agee's express contract not to make any public statements about Agency matters without prior clearance by the Agency, and prejudiced the ability of the United States to obtain intelligence. They were followed by episodes of violence against the persons and organizations identified.

In December 1979, Secretary of State Cyrus Vance revoked Agee's passport and delivered an explanatory notice to Agee in West Germany, where he was living. It advised Agee that his activities abroad were causing or were likely to cause serious damage to the national security or the foreign policy of the United States and that he had a right to an administrative hearing. It offered to hold such a hearing in West Germany on 5 days' notice.

Agee at once filed suit against the Secretary. He alleged that the regulation invoked by the Secretary, 22 CFR 51.70 (b)(4)(1980), was not authorized by Congress and was invalid; that the regulation was impermissibly overbroad; that revocation prior to a hearing violated his Fifth Amendment right to procedural due process; and that the revocation violated a Fifth Amendment liberty interest in a right to travel and a First Amendment right to criticize Government policies. He sought declaratory and injunctive relief, and he moved for summary judgment on the question of the authority to promulgate the regulation and on the constitutional claims. For purposes of that motion, Agee conceded that his activities were causing or were likely to cause serious damage to the national security or foreign policy of the United States. The District Court held that the regulation exceeded the statutory powers of the Secretary under the Passport Act of 1926, 22 U.S.C. 211a, granted summary judgment for Agee, and ordered the Secretary to restore his passport.

A divided panel of the Court of Appeals affirmed the district court. It held that the Secretary was required to show that Congress had authorized the regulation either by an express delegation or by implied approval of a "substantial and consistent" administrative practice, citing Zemel v. Rusk (1965). The court found no express statutory authority for the revocation. The Court of Appeals took note of the Secretary's reliance on "a series of statutes, regulations, proclamations, orders and advisory opinions dating back to 1856," but declined to consider those authorities, reasoning that "the criterion for establishing congressional assent by inaction is the actual imposition of sanctions and not the mere assertion of power." The Court of Appeals held that it was not sufficient that "Agee's conduct may be considered by some to border on treason," since "[w]e are bound by the law as we find it." The court also regarded it as material that most of the Secretary's authorities dealt with powers of the Executive Branch "during time of war or national emergency" or with respect to persons "engaged in criminal conduct."

The Court granted certiorari in the case, then called Muskie v. Agee, and stayed the judgment of the Court of Appeals until its disposition of the case.

== Majority opinion ==
The Court began by examining the language of the statute, concluding that although the Passport Act did not in so many words confer upon the Secretary a power to revoke or to deny passport applications, it was beyond dispute that the Secretary had the power to deny a passport for reasons not specified in the statutes. A consistent administrative construction of the 1926 Act must be followed by the courts "`unless there are compelling indications that it is wrong.'" Matters intimately related to foreign policy and national security were rarely proper subjects for judicial intervention particularly in light of the "broad rule-making authority granted in the 1926 Act," citing Zemel.

It then surveyed passport law and administrative policy and practice from 1835 to 1966, concluding that the history of passport controls since the earliest days of the Republic showed congressional recognition of Executive authority to withhold passports on the basis of substantial reasons of national security and foreign policy. It compared Congressional action and inaction concerning the broad rule-making authority granted in earlier Acts, concluding that there was "weighty" evidence of congressional approval of the Secretary's interpretation that it had been delegated the power to restrict passports on the basis of national security. The Court rejected Agee's argument that the only way the Executive could establish implicit congressional approval is by proof of longstanding and consistent enforcement of the claimed power. It distinguished Kent noting that although there had been few situations involving substantial likelihood of serious damage to the national security or foreign policy of the United States as a result of a passport holder's activities abroad, that in the cases which had arisen, the Secretary had consistently exercised his power to withhold passports. And it rejected Agee's contention that the statements of Executive policy are entitled to diminished weight because many of them concern the powers of the Executive in wartime.

It held incorrect the notion that "illegal conduct" and problems of allegiance were, "so far as relevant here, ... the only [grounds] which it could fairly be argued were adopted by Congress in light of prior administrative practice," Kent at 127-128, was not correct because Kent also recognized that the legitimacy of the objective of safeguarding our national security was "obvious and unarguable." id at 509 and that the protection accorded beliefs standing alone is very different from the protection accorded conduct. Thus, it held that the policy announced in the challenged regulations is "sufficiently substantial and consistent" to compel the conclusion that Congress has approved it.

Regarding Agee's Constitutional attacks, the Court held that they, too, were without merit. The revocation of his passport did not impermissibly burdens his freedom to travel because the freedom to travel abroad with a "letter of introduction" in the form of a passport issued by the sovereign is subordinate to national security and foreign policy considerations; as such, it is subject to reasonable governmental regulation. The action was not intended to penalize his exercise of free speech and deter his criticism of Government policies and practices because assuming, arguendo, that First Amendment protections reach beyond our national boundaries, revocation of Agee's passport rested in part on the content of his speech. To the extent the revocation of his passport operates to inhibit Agee, "it is an inhibition of action," rather than of speech. And that failure to accord him a prerevocation hearing did not violate his Fifth Amendment right to procedural due process because when there is a substantial likelihood of "serious damage" to national security or foreign policy as a result of a passport holder's activities in foreign countries, the Government may take action to ensure that the holder may not exploit the sponsorship of his travels by the United States.

The Court found that the right to hold a passport is subordinate to national security and foreign policy considerations, and is subject to reasonable governmental regulation. Denial of Agee's passport was not protected under the First Amendment because unlike Kent v. Dulles and Aptheker v. Secretary of State involving denials of passports solely on the basis of political beliefs entitled to First Amendment protection, Agee's actions amounted to more than speech and that the national security interests here, as in Zemel v. Rusk, were sufficiently important to justify revocation. Finally, the Court held that the Government was not required to hold a pre-revocation hearing, since where there was a substantial likelihood of "serious damage" to national security or foreign policy as the result of a passport holder's activities abroad, the Government may take action to ensure that the holder may not exploit the United States' sponsorship of his travels. Further, a statement of reasons and an opportunity for a prompt post-revocation hearing were sufficient to satisfy the Constitution's due process guarantees.

== Concurrence ==
Blackmun concurred, stating simply that he believed this case had cut back somewhat on the standards articulated in Zemel v. Rusk and Kent v. Dulles sub silencio and that it would have been better if the Court had forthrightly construed the law such that evidence of a longstanding Executive policy or construction in this area be probative of the issue of congressional authorization.

== Dissent ==
Justice Brennan wrote a dissent that Justice Marshall joined. He found that the decision strayed from the precedent set by Zemel and Kent because neither Zemel nor Kent held that a longstanding Executive policy or construction was sufficient proof that Congress had implicitly authorized the Secretary's action. Those cases held that an administrative practice must be demonstrated; Kent unequivocally stated that mere construction by the Executive – no matter how longstanding and consistent – was not sufficient. Only when Congress had maintained its silence in the face of a consistent and substantial pattern of actual passport denials or revocations – where the parties will presumably object loudly, perhaps through legal action, to the Secretary's exercise of discretion – can this Court be sure that Congress is aware of the Secretary's actions and has implicitly approved that exercise of discretion.

The decision also relied on the very Executive construction and policy deemed irrelevant in Kent. The Court's reliance on material expressly abjured in Kent was understandable only when considering the paucity of recorded administrative practice – the only evidence upon which Kent and Zemel permit reliance – with respect to passport denials or revocations based on foreign policy or national security considerations relating to an individual. Only three occasions were cited over the past 33 years when the Secretary revoked passports for such reasons.

Finally, just as the Constitution protected both popular and unpopular speech, it likewise protected both popular and unpopular travelers. The decision applied not only to Philip Agee, whose activities could be perceived as harming the national security, but also to other citizens who may merely disagree with Government foreign policy and express their views. The Justices feared that the majority decision handed too much lawmaking function over the government when the Constitution allocated it to the Congress. The point that Kent and Zemel made, and the majority opinion should make, is that the Executive's authority to revoke passports touched an area fraught with important constitutional rights, and that the Court should therefore "construe narrowly all delegated powers that curtail or dilute them". Kent v. Dulles at 129 The presumption should be that Congress must expressly delegate authority to the Secretary to deny or revoke passports for foreign policy or national security reasons before he may exercise such authority and to overcome the presumption against an implied delegation, the Government must show "an administrative practice sufficiently substantial and consistent". Zemel v. Rusk, at 12.

== See also ==
- List of United States Supreme Court cases, volume 453
- List of United States Supreme Court cases involving the First Amendment
