= United States v. Wheeler (1920) =

- Supreme Court of the United States

Argued April 28, 1920 Decided December 13, 1920
- Full case name: United States v. Wheeler, et al.
- Citations: 254 U.S. 281 (more) 41 S. Ct. 133; 65 L. Ed. 270; 1920 U.S. LEXIS 1159

Case history
- Prior: Demurrer sustained, United States v. Wheeler, 254 F. 611 (D. Ariz. 1918).
- Subsequent: parallelcitations

Holding
- The Constitution grants to states, not the federal government, the power to prosecute individuals for wrongful interference with the right to travel.

Court membership
- Chief Justice Edward D. White Associate Justices Joseph McKenna · Oliver W. Holmes Jr. William R. Day · Willis Van Devanter; Mahlon Pitney · James C. McReynolds; Louis Brandeis · John H. Clarke

Case opinions
- Majority: White, joined by McKenna, Holmes, Day, Van Devanter, Pitney, McReynolds, Brandeis
- Dissent: Clarke

Laws applied
- U.S. Const. art. IV, §2; §19 of the Criminal Code

United States v. Wheeler, 254 U.S. 281 (1920), was an 8-to-1 landmark decision of the US Supreme Court that held that the Constitution alone does not grant the federal government the power to prosecute kidnappers, even if moving abductees across state lines on federally-regulated railroads at the behest of local law enforcement officials, and only the states have the authority to punish a private citizen's unlawful violation of another's freedom of movement. The case was a landmark interpretation of the Privileges and Immunities Clause of the Constitution, and contains a classic legal statement of the right to travel which continues to undergird American jurisprudence.

== Background ==
On June 26, 1917, Local 800 of the Industrial Workers of the World (or IWW, a labor union), struck the Phelps Dodge Corporation and other mining companies in the town of Bisbee, Arizona. Nearly 3,000 miners (about 38% of the town's total population) walked out. The strike was a peaceful one. However, Walter S. Douglas, the president of Phelps Dodge, was determined to break the strike.

On July 11, Douglas and other Phelps Dodge corporate executives met with Cochise County Sheriff Harry C. Wheeler to conspire to seize, by force of arms, all the striking workers, forcibly transport (deport) them several hundred miles away from Bisbee, and abandon them in another desert town without food, clothing or funds. To this end, Sheriff Wheeler recruited and deputized 2,200 men from Bisbee and the nearby town of Douglas to act as a posse. Phelps Dodge officials also met with executives of the El Paso and Southwestern Railroad, who agreed to provide rail transportation for any deportees. Phelps Dodge and the other employers provided Sheriff Wheeler with a list of all the men on strike, as well as suspected IWW sympathizers.

At 6:30 a.m. on the morning of July 12, the 2,200 deputies moved through town and arrested every man on their list as well as any man who refused to work in the mines. About 2,000 men were seized and taken by armed guards to a baseball stadium two miles away. Several hundred men were freed after being permitted to denounce the IWW. At 11:00 a.m., 23 cattle cars belonging to the El Paso and Southwestern Railroad arrived in Bisbee, and the remaining 1,286 arrestees were forced at gunpoint to board the train. The detainees were transported 200 miles (320 km) for 16 h through the desert without food or water. They were unloaded in the Tres Hermanas mountain range in Luna County, New Mexico without money or transportation at 3:00 a.m. on July 13 and told not to return to Bisbee or they would suffer physical harm.

The Luna County sheriff and New Mexico Governor Washington E. Lindsey contacted President Woodrow Wilson for assistance. Wilson ordered US Army troops to escort the men to Columbus, New Mexico. The deportees were housed in tents meant for Mexican refugees who had fled across the border to escape the Army's Pancho Villa Expedition. The men were allowed to stay in the camp until September 17, 1917.

Sheriff Wheeler established armed guards at all entrances to Bisbee and Douglas. Any citizen seeking to exit or enter the town over the next several months had to have a "passport" issued by Wheeler. Any adult male in town who was not known to the sheriff's men was brought before a secret sheriff's kangaroo court. Hundreds of citizens were tried, and most of them deported and threatened with lynching if they returned.

The deported citizens of Bisbee pleaded with President Wilson for law enforcement assistance in returning to their homes. In October 1917, Wilson appointed a commission of five individuals, led by Secretary of Labor William B. Wilson (with assistance from Assistant Secretary of Labor Felix Frankfurter), to investigate labor disputes in Arizona. The commission heard testimony during the first five days of November 1917. In its final report, issued on November 6, 1917, the commission declared the deportations "wholly illegal and without authority in law, either State or Federal."

On May 15, 1918, the U.S. Department of Justice ordered the arrest of 21 mining company executives and several Bisbee and Cochise County elected leaders and law enforcement officers. The indictment contained four counts. Three counts alleged conspiracy to violate §19 of the United States Criminal Code. A fourth count was dropped before trial.ʾ The indictments did not reference any federal law as there was no law in existence at the time made kidnapping (or abduction, felonious or unlawful restraint, or felonious or unlawful imprisonment) a crime. Thus, the government was forced to rely on a dubious claim of an implied federal power in order to prosecute Wheeler and the others.

The defense, led by a Phelps Dodge corporate attorney (provided pro bono), filed a pre-trial motion in a federal district court to release the 21 men on the grounds that no federal laws had been violated. In Wheeler v. United States, 254 Fed. Rep. 611 (1919), the district court threw out the indictments on the grounds that, absent specific statutory authorization, the Constitution did not grant the States the authority to punish the alleged illegal acts. The Justice Department appealed to the Supreme Court. W. C. Herron, a Washington, D.C.-based attorney and brother-in-law of former President William Howard Taft, argued the case for the United States. Former Associate Justice and future Chief Justice Charles Evans Hughes led the team which argued the case for Phelps Dodge.

== Decision ==
Chief Justice Edward Douglass White wrote the opinion for the 8–1 majority, in which the judgment of the district court was affirmed. Associate Justice John Hessin Clarke dissented, but wrote no opinion.

White opened the majority's decision by reviewing at length the four indictments and briefly describing the ruling of the federal district court. Then, in a section widely quoted in American jurisprudence for the next century, White described the fundamental right which was at issue:

In all the States from the beginning down to the adoption of the Articles of Confederation the citizens thereof possessed the fundamental right, inherent in citizens of all free governments, peacefully to dwell within the limits of their respective States, to move at will from place to place therein, and to have free ingress thereto and egress therefrom, with a consequent authority in the States to forbid and punish violations of this fundamental right.

White next outlined the history of the "privileges and immunities" clause of Article IV, Sec. 2, of the Constitution. In the space of less than one sentence, White came to the landmark conclusion that only the states had enforcement authority over the "privileges and immunities" mentioned in Article IV. The "privileges and immunity" clause, White wrote, was a linear descendant of a similar if limited clause in the Articles of Confederation. "[The] Constitution plainly intended to preserve and enforce the limitation..." White reasoned, and thus "the continued possession by the States of the reserved power to deal with free residence, ingress and egress, cannot be denied."

The principle of comity enshrined in Art. IV, Sec. 2, is one of the most fundamental principles in the Constitution, White claimed. It was, he asserted, the very basis for the Union. The right encompassed not only travel between the separate states but also movement within a state, but while the Constitution fused these two rights into one, it reserved exclusively to the states the power to enforce these rights, except when a state violated the rule of comity.

Relying exclusively on the Slaughter-House Cases, and United States v. Harris, White noted that Art. IV, Sec. 2, may be invoked solely when a state actor is involved. White distinguished Crandall v. Nevada, by noting that that decision had involved state action.

== Aftermath ==
Several of the deported citizens brought civil actions against Wheeler, Douglas and the others. But in State v. Wootton, Crim. No. 2685 (Cochise County, Ariz. September 13, 1919), a jury refused to find in favor of the complainants and give them relief. Defendant Wootton argued that the IWW members were such a threat to public safety that necessity demanded their removal. The jury agreed, making this one of the rare times in American law in which the necessity defense was successfully used. After this failure at law, nearly all the remaining civil suits were dropped (although a handful were settled for small sums of money). Few, if any, of the deported citizens ever returned to Bisbee. Congress did not make kidnapping a federal criminal offense until 1932, after the kidnapping and death of Charles Lindbergh, Jr. In United States v. Guest (1966), the Supreme Court overruled Chief Justice White's conclusion that the federal government could protect the right to travel only against state infringement.

== Impact ==
United States v. Wheeler established that the Constitution's Privileges and Immunities Clause had its roots in the Articles of Confederation. In 1823, the circuit court in Corfield had provided a list of the rights (some fundamental, some not) that the clause could cover. According to the legal historian William E. Nelson, by reasoning that the clause derived from Article IV of the Articles of Confederation, the decision suggested a narrower set of rights than those enumerated in Corfield, but also more clearly defined those rights as fundamental.

United States v. Wheeler also established that one of the sources of the right to travel is the Privileges and Immunities Clause, providing the right with a specific guarantee of constitutional protection. Chief Justice White's statement of the right to travel is frequently cited by courts and remains the classic formulation of the right to travel.

The Supreme Court's rejection of Wheeler's state actor rationale but acceptance of its strong defense of the right to travel led to a number of additional court decisions and the establishment of a new constitutional test. In Kent v. Dulles, the Court held that the federal government may not restrict the right to travel without due process. Six years later in Aptheker v. Secretary of State (1964), the Court struck down a federal ban restricting travel by communists. But the court struggled to find a way to protect legitimate government interests (such as national security) in light of these decisions. Just a year after Aptheker, the Supreme Court fashioned the rational relationship test for constitutionality in Zemel v. Rusk, as a way of reconciling the rights of the individual with the interests of the state.

The Wheeler Court's establishment of a strong constitutional right to travel has also had far-reaching and unintended effects. For example, the Supreme Court overturned state prohibitions on welfare payments to individuals who had not resided within the jurisdiction for at least one year as an impermissible burden on the right to travel. The Court has used Wheeler to strike down one-year residency requirements for voting in state elections, one-year waiting periods before receiving state-provided medical care, civil service preferences for state veterans, and higher fishing and hunting license fees for out-of-state residents.

== See also ==
- List of United States Supreme Court cases, volume 254
