= Buffalo Forge v. Steelworkers =

Buffalo Forge Co. v. Steelworkers
- Supreme Court of the United States

Decided July 6, 1976
- Full case name: Buffalo Forge Co. v. United Steelworkers of America, AFL-CIO
- Citations: 428 U.S. 397 (more)

Holding
- Under the NLA, courts may not order injunctive relief pending arbitration to stop sympathy strikes, but courts may uphold an arbitrator's determination that a sympathy strike violated a collective bargaining agreement.

Court membership
- Chief Justice Warren E. Burger Associate Justices William J. Brennan Jr. · Potter Stewart; Byron White · Thurgood Marshall; Harry Blackmun · Lewis F. Powell Jr. William Rehnquist · John P. Stevens

Case opinions
- Majority: White
- Dissent: Stevens, joined by Brennan, Marshall, Powell

Laws applied
- Norris–LaGuardia Act

Buffalo Forge Co. v. Steelworkers, 428 U.S. 397 (1976), was a United States Supreme Court case in which the court held that, under the Norris–LaGuardia Act, courts may not order injunctive relief pending arbitration to stop sympathy strikes, but courts may uphold an arbitrator's determination that a sympathy strike violated a collective bargaining agreement.

== Background ==
After Buffalo Forge Company's "office clerical-technical" (O&T) employees went on strike and picketed their plants during negotiations for a collective bargaining contract, Buffalo Forge's production and maintenance (P&M) employees, who were represented by the United Steelworkers of America, honored the O&T picket lines and stopped work in support of the sister unions representing the O&T employees. Buffalo Forge then filed suit against United Steelworkers under § 301(a) of the Labor Management Relations Act, claiming that the P&M employees' work stoppage violated the no-strike clause in the collective bargaining contracts between Buffalo Forge and United Steelworkers. Buffalo Forge's position was that the question whether such work stoppage violated the no-strike clause was arbitrable under the grievance and arbitration provisions of the contracts for settling disputes over the interpretation and application of each contract. Buffalo Forge sought damages, injunctive relief, and an order directing respondents to arbitrate that question. The federal District Court, concluding that the work stoppage was the result of P&M employees' engaging in a sympathy strike in support of the striking O&T employees, held that it was prohibited from issuing an injunction by § 4 of the Norris-LaGuardia Act because the P&M employees' strike was not an "arbitrable grievance," and hence was not within the "narrow" exception to the Norris-LaGuardia Act established in Boys Markets v. Retail Clerks Union. The Second Circuit Court of Appeals affirmed.

== Opinion of the court ==
The Supreme Court issued an opinion on July 6, 1976.
