= Avco Corp. v. Machinists =

- Supreme Court of the United States

Decided April 8, 1968
- Full case name: Avco Corp. v. Aero Lodge No. 735, International Ass'n of Machinists & Aerospace Workers
- Citations: 390 U.S. 557 (more)

Holding
- A suit for breach of a collective bargaining agreement can be removed to federal court under federal question jurisdiction.

Court membership
- Chief Justice Earl Warren Associate Justices Hugo Black · William O. Douglas; John M. Harlan II · William J. Brennan Jr. Potter Stewart · Byron White; Abe Fortas · Thurgood Marshall

Case opinions
- Majority: Douglas, joined by unanimous
- Concurrence: Stewart, joined by Harlan, Brennan

Avco Corp. v. Machinists, 390 U.S. 557 (1968), was a United States Supreme Court case in which the court held that a suit for breach of a collective bargaining agreement can be removed to federal court under federal question jurisdiction.

== Background ==
Avco Corporation, an employer, brought suit in a Tennessee court to enjoin the Machinists union and its members from striking in violation of a no-strike clause in the collective bargaining agreement. The state court issued an ex parte injunction. The union moved in federal District Court for removal of the case, and dissolution of the injunction. The District Court ruled that the action was within its original jurisdiction, denied a motion to remand to the state court, and dissolved the injunction. The Sixth Circuit Court of Appeals affirmed.

== Supreme Court decision ==
The Supreme court issued an opinion on April 8, 1968. The Supreme Court held that the case could be removed to federal court.

== Subsequent developments ==
Once a case is removed to federal court, it must obey federal procedural law. In Sinclair Refining Co. v. Atkinson, the Supreme Court upheld the Norris–LaGuardia Act, which prohibited federal judges from issuing injunctions in labor disputes. Combined with Avco Corp., this meant that a labor dispute case could be filed in a state court where an injunction could have been issued but immediately be removed to a federal court prohibited from issuing an injunction. The Supreme Court described this as "anomalous" in Boys Markets v. Retail Clerks and overturned Sinclair.
