= Duplex Printing Press Co. v. Deering =

- Supreme Court of the United States

Argued January 22, 1920 Decided January 3, 1921
- Full case name: Duplex Printing Press Company v. Deering, et al., individually and as business agents of District No. 15 of the International Association of Machinists, et al.
- Citations: 254 U.S. 443 (more) 41 S. Ct. 172; 65 L. Ed. 349; 16 A.L.R. 196; 18 Ohio L. Rep. 366

Holding
- The Clayton Act did not insulate labor unions engaged in illegal activities.

Court membership
- Chief Justice Edward D. White Associate Justices Joseph McKenna · Oliver W. Holmes Jr. William R. Day · Willis Van Devanter; Mahlon Pitney · James C. McReynolds; Louis Brandeis · John H. Clarke

Case opinions
- Majority: Pitney, joined by White, McKenna, Day, Van Devanter, McReynolds
- Dissent: Brandeis, joined by Holmes, Clarke

Laws applied
- Clayton Act

Duplex Printing Press Co. v. Deering, 254 U.S. 443 (1921), is a United States Supreme Court case which examined the labor provisions of the Clayton Antitrust Act and reaffirmed the prior ruling in Loewe v. Lawlor that a secondary boycott was an illegal restraint on trade. The decision authorized courts to issue injunctions to block this practice, and any other tactics used by labor unions that were deemed unlawful restraints on trade.

== Background ==
In response to growing public pressure to control the unprecedented concentrations of economic power that developed after the American Civil War, Congress enacted the Sherman Antitrust Act (1890). It proscribed "unlawful restraints and monopolies" in interstate commerce as well as conspiracies to erect them. Soon thereafter federal judges began to employ the measure to combat efforts to unionize workers and to deny labor its traditional self-help weapons. To counteract this "government by injunction," the United States Congress included in the Clayton Act (1914) provisions that sought to preclude application of antitrust legislation against organized labor.

== Opinion of the Court ==
The Supreme Court reached the issue in Deering, a six-judge majority holding that the Clayton Act did not insulate labor unions engaged in illegal activities, such as the conduct of a secondary boycott. Justice Mahlon Pitney asserted that the machinist union's coercive action constituted an unlawful conspiracy to "obstruct and destroy" (p. 460) the interstate trade of complainant, a company with which they were not "proximately or substantially concerned" (p. 472).

=== Dissent ===
Writing for the three dissenters, Justice Louis D. Brandeis charged the majority with ignoring law and reality: the injunction imposed by the Court deprived labor of forms of a collective action Congress had tried "expressly" to legalize (p. 486).

== Subsequent history ==
For more than a decade, the majority's narrow interpretation of the nation's antitrust legislation sanctioned judicial application of injunctions against workers seeking to organize to advance their interests. With the dramatic transformation of opinion brought about by the Great Depression, Congress included in the Norris‐LaGuardia Act (1932) provisions to exempt organized labor from antitrust injunctions, and the Supreme Court legitimated this fundamental New Deal legislation.

== See also ==
- Machinists v. Street
- List of United States Supreme Court cases, volume 254
