= Sinclair Refining Co. v. Atkinson =

- Supreme Court of the United States

Decided June 18, 1962
- Full case name: Sinclair Refining Co. v. Atkinson
- Citations: 370 U.S. 195 (more)

Holding
- The Norris–La Guardia Act prohibits injunctive relief as a remedy for the breach of a no-strike clause.

Court membership
- Chief Justice Earl Warren Associate Justices Hugo Black · Felix Frankfurter; William O. Douglas · Tom C. Clark; John M. Harlan II · William J. Brennan Jr. Potter Stewart · Byron White

Case opinions
- Majority: Black
- Dissent: Brennan, joined by Douglas, Harlan

Laws applied
- Norris–LaGuardia Act
- Overruled by
- Boys Markets v. Retail Clerks

Sinclair Refining Co. v. Atkinson, 370 U.S. 195 (1962), was a United States Supreme Court case in which the court held that the Norris–LaGuardia Act prohibits injunctive relief as a remedy for the breach of a no-strike clause.

== Background ==
Sinclair Refining Company brought suit under Section 301(a) of the Labor Management Relations Act of 1947 to enjoin work stoppages, strikes, peaceful picketing and similar activities by labor unions and their officers and members. Sinclair alleged that these actions were in violation of a collective bargaining agreement containing a no-strike clause and providing a grievance procedure culminating in compulsory, final and binding arbitration of "any difference regarding wages, hours or working conditions."

== Opinion of the court ==
The Supreme Court issued an opinion on June 18, 1962.

== Subsequent developments ==
In Avco Corp. v. Machinists, the Supreme Court held that a suit for breach of a collective bargaining agreement can be removed to federal court under federal question jurisdiction. Once a case is removed to federal court, it must obey federal procedural law. Sinclair combined with Avco Corp. meant that a labor dispute case could be filed in a state court where an injunction could have been issued but immediately be removed to a federal court prohibited from issuing an injunction. The Supreme Court described this as "anomalous" in Boys Markets v. Retail Clerks and overturned Sinclair.
