= United States v. Davis (1962) =

- Supreme Court of the United States

Argued March 28, 1962 Decided June 4, 1962
- Full case name: United States v. Thomas Crawley Davis, et al.
- Citations: 370 U.S. 65 (more) 82 S. Ct. 1190; 8 L. Ed. 2d 335

Case history
- Prior: Davis v. United States, 287 F.2d 168 (Ct. Cl. 1961); cert. granted, 368 U.S. 813 (1961).

Holding
- A taxpayer recognizes a gain on the transfer of appreciated property in satisfaction of a legal obligation

Court membership
- Chief Justice Earl Warren Associate Justices Hugo Black · Felix Frankfurter; William O. Douglas · Tom C. Clark; John M. Harlan II · William J. Brennan Jr. Potter Stewart · Byron White

Case opinion
- Majority: Clark, joined by unanimous
- Frankfurter, White took no part in the consideration or decision of the case.
- Overruled by
- I.R.C. § 1041

United States v. Davis, 370 U.S. 65 (1962), is a federal income tax case argued before the United States Supreme Court in 1962, holding that a taxpayer recognizes a gain on the transfer of appreciated property in satisfaction of a legal obligation.

In 1984, "having heard criticism of the Davis/Farid rule for many years," Congress overruled the main holding: Under § 1041(a), no gain or loss shall be recognized by the transferor-spouse (or former spouse, but "only if the transfer is incident to divorce"); as a corollary, §1041(b) provides that transferor's basis shall carry over into the hands of the transferee-spouse. (Thus, for transfers between spouses, §1041(b) overrules the lower-of-cost-or-market rule for determining loss on subsequent sale of a gift, in §1015.)

== Facts ==
Pursuant to a separation agreement, the taxpayer's (ex-)wife agreed to relinquish any potential claims or marital rights, in exchange for which he transferred to her 1,000 shares of stock in DuPont. These shares had cost him $74,775.37, and had appreciated to $82,250 at the time of the transfer.

The government argued that the appreciation should be included in the taxpayer's gross income, viewing the transfer of property as an exchange for the release of an independent legal obligation. The taxpayer argued that the appreciation should not count as gross income, since the transfer was more like a division of property between co-owners than a sale that resulted in gain.

== Holding ==
The Supreme Court held that the $7,000 appreciation should count as gross income, as "the 'amount realized' from the exchange is the fair market value of the released marital rights, which in this case would be equal to the value of the stock transferred."

=== Further reasoning ===
The court bolstered its position by arguing that the lower court's ruling (that the value of the released marital rights is indeterminable and therefore, not included in gross income) could prejudice the taxpayer's spouse, as her basis in the shares would not include the $7,000 appreciation, and she would have to include this in her gross income if she decided to sell the shares.

== Overruled by Congress ==
In response to this decision, Congress enacted Internal Revenue Code § 1041. This statute provides that, generally, "no gain or loss shall be recognized on a transfer of property from an individual to...(2) a former spouse, but only if the transfer is incident to divorce."

While this statute overrules the specific holding of Davis, it does not change the general rule—that "a taxpayer recognizes a gain on the transfer of appreciated property in satisfaction of a legal obligation."

These legislative changes were regarded by most tax specialists as overdue and welcome, because the Davis/Farid rule had a number of weaknesses:

- It had been a complicating factor in divorce settlements
- It resulted in better treatment for residents of community property states (since the Service had held that it would not apply Davis to an equal division of community property) that for residents of common law jurisdictions.
- It added considerably to the Treasury's enforcement burden—the Treasury ran the risk that gain would be reported by neither spouse, unless it was prepared to audit every substantial property settlement:

- transferor-spouses sometimes seemed not to know about Davis or to find it counter-intuitive, and hence often omitted to report their taxable gain when property was transferred.
- By contrast, transferee-spouses, well aware of Farid, almost invariably computed their gain(loss) on subsequent sale by using a basis equal to fair market value at time of receipt.

== See also ==
- List of United States Supreme Court cases, volume 370
- Draft-card burning
