= List of United States Supreme Court cases, volume 254 =

Supreme Court of the United States
- Interactive map of Supreme Court of the United States
- 38°53′26″N 77°00′16″W
- Established: March 4, 1789; 237 years ago
- Location: Washington, D.C.
- Coordinates: 38°53′26″N 77°00′16″W
- Composition method: Presidential nomination with Senate confirmation
- Authorised by: Constitution of the United States, Art. III, § 1
- Judge term length: life tenure, subject to impeachment and removal
- Number of positions: 9 (by statute)
- Website: supremecourt.gov

This is a list of cases reported in volume 254 of United States Reports, decided by the Supreme Court of the United States in 1920 and 1921.

== Justices of the Supreme Court at the time of volume 254 U.S. ==
The Supreme Court is established by Article III, Section 1 of the Constitution of the United States, which says: "The judicial Power of the United States, shall be vested in one supreme Court . . .". The size of the Court is not specified; the Constitution leaves it to Congress to set the number of justices. Under the Judiciary Act of 1789 Congress originally fixed the number of justices at six (one chief justice and five associate justices). Since 1789 Congress has varied the size of the Court from six to seven, nine, ten, and back to nine justices (always including one chief justice).

When the cases in volume 254 were decided the Court comprised the following nine members:

Portrait	Justice	Office	Home State	Succeeded	Date confirmed by the Senate (Vote)	Tenure on Supreme Court
	Edward Douglass White	Chief Justice	Louisiana	Melville Fuller	December 12, 1910 (Acclamation)	December 19, 1910 – May 19, 1921 (Died)
	Joseph McKenna	Associate Justice	California	Stephen Johnson Field	January 21, 1898 (Acclamation)	January 26, 1898 – January 5, 1925 (Retired)
	Oliver Wendell Holmes Jr.	Associate Justice	Massachusetts	Horace Gray	December 4, 1902 (Acclamation)	December 8, 1902 – January 12, 1932 (Retired)
	William R. Day	Associate Justice	Ohio	George Shiras Jr.	February 23, 1903 (Acclamation)	March 2, 1903 – November 13, 1922 (Retired)
	Willis Van Devanter	Associate Justice	Wyoming	Edward Douglass White (as Associate Justice)	December 15, 1910 (Acclamation)	January 3, 1911 – June 2, 1937 (Retired)
	Mahlon Pitney	Associate Justice	New Jersey	John Marshall Harlan	March 13, 1912 (50–26)	March 18, 1912 – December 31, 1922 (Resigned)
	James Clark McReynolds	Associate Justice	Tennessee	Horace Harmon Lurton	August 29, 1914 (44–6)	October 12, 1914 – January 31, 1941 (Retired)
	Louis Brandeis	Associate Justice	Massachusetts	Joseph Rucker Lamar	June 1, 1916 (47–22)	June 5, 1916 – February 13, 1939 (Retired)
	John Hessin Clarke	Associate Justice	Ohio	Charles Evans Hughes	July 24, 1916 (Acclamation)	October 9, 1916 – September 18, 1922 (Retired)

== Notable Cases in 254 U.S. ==
=== United States v. Wheeler ===
In United States v. Wheeler, 254 U.S. 281 (1920), the Supreme Court held that the Constitution alone does not grant the federal government the power to prosecute kidnappers, even if moving abductees across state lines on federally-regulated railroads at the behest of local law enforcement officials, and only the states have the authority to punish a private citizen's unlawful violation of another's freedom of movement. The case was a landmark interpretation of the Privileges and Immunities Clause of the Constitution, and contains a classic legal statement of the right to travel in American jurisprudence. In most common law jurisdictions, kidnapping had been outlawed by the courts, not by statute, but the Supreme Court had held in United States v. Hudson and Goodwin (1812) that the Constitution prohibited common law crimes. It was only after the Lindbergh kidnapping in 1932, which ended in the death of 21-month-old Charles Lindbergh, Jr., that Congress passed the Federal Kidnapping Act, which prohibited kidnapping.

=== Duplex Printing Press Co. v. Deering ===
Duplex Printing Press Co. v. Deering, 254 U.S. 443 (1921), is an antitrust case in which the Supreme Court examined the labor provisions of the Clayton Antitrust Act and reaffirmed its prior ruling in Loewe v. Lawlor that a secondary boycott was an illegal restraint on trade. The decision authorized courts to issue injunctions to block this practice, and any other tactics used by labor unions that were deemed unlawful restraints on trade.

== Citation style ==
Under the Judiciary Act of 1789 the federal court structure at the time comprised District Courts, which had general trial jurisdiction; Circuit Courts, which had mixed trial and appellate (from the US District Courts) jurisdiction; and the United States Supreme Court, which had appellate jurisdiction over the federal District and Circuit courts—and for certain issues over state courts. The Supreme Court also had limited original jurisdiction (i.e., in which cases could be filed directly with the Supreme Court without first having been heard by a lower federal or state court). There were one or more federal District Courts and/or Circuit Courts in each state, territory, or other geographical region.

The Judiciary Act of 1891 created the United States Courts of Appeals and reassigned the jurisdiction of most routine appeals from the district and circuit courts to these appellate courts. The Act created nine new courts that were originally known as the "United States Circuit Courts of Appeals." The new courts had jurisdiction over most appeals of lower court decisions. The Supreme Court could review either legal issues that a court of appeals certified or decisions of court of appeals by writ of certiorari. On January 1, 1912, the effective date of the Judicial Code of 1911, the old Circuit Courts were abolished, with their remaining trial court jurisdiction transferred to the U.S. District Courts.

Bluebook citation style is used for case names, citations, and jurisdictions.

- "# Cir." = United States Court of Appeals
  - e.g., "3d Cir." = United States Court of Appeals for the Third Circuit
- "D." = United States District Court for the District of . . .
  - e.g.,"D. Mass." = United States District Court for the District of Massachusetts
- "E." = Eastern; "M." = Middle; "N." = Northern; "S." = Southern; "W." = Western
  - e.g.,"M.D. Ala." = United States District Court for the Middle District of Alabama
- "Ct. Cl." = United States Court of Claims
- The abbreviation of a state's name alone indicates the highest appellate court in that state's judiciary at the time.
  - e.g.,"Pa." = Supreme Court of Pennsylvania
  - e.g.,"Me." = Supreme Judicial Court of Maine

== List of cases in volume 254 U.S. ==
Case Name	Page and year	Opinion of the Court	Concurring opinion(s)	Dissenting opinion(s)	Lower Court	Disposition
Piedmont and Georges Creek Coal Company v. Seaboard Fisheries Company	1 (1920)	Brandeis	none	none	1st Cir.	affirmed
Western Union Telegraph Company v. Speight	17 (1920)	Holmes	none	none	N.C.	reversed
Heald v. District of Columbia	20 (1920)	White	none	none	D.C. Cir.	dismissed
New York Scaffolding Company v. Liebel-Binney Construction Company	24 (1920)	McKenna	none	none	3d Cir.	affirmed
New York Scaffolding Company v. Chain Belt Company	32 (1920)	McKenna	none	none	7th Cir.	reversed
United States v. Butt	38 (1920)	McKenna	none	none	N.D. Cal.	reversed
Pryor v. Williams	43 (1920)	McKenna	none	none	Mo.	reversed
New York ex rel. Troy Union Railroad Company v. Mealy	47 (1920)	Holmes	none	none	N.Y. Sup. Ct.	affirmed
Johnson v. Maryland	51 (1920)	Holmes	none	none	Md. Cir. Ct.	reversed
Seaboard Air Line Railroad Company v. United States	57 (1920)	Day	none	none	E.D. Va.	affirmed
Turner v. Wade	64 (1920)	Day	none	none	Ga.	reversed
Arndstein v. McCarthy I	71 (1920)	McReynolds	none	none	S.D.N.Y.	reversed
United States v. National Surety Company	73 (1920)	Brandeis	none	none	8th Cir.	reversed
Niles-Bement-Pond Company v. Iron Moulders Union Local No. 68	77 (1920)	Clarke	none	none	6th Cir.	affirmed
Wells Brothers Company of New York v. United States	83 (1920)	Clarke	none	none	Ct. Cl.	affirmed
Street v. Lincoln Safe Deposit Company	88 (1920)	Clarke	McReynolds	none	S.D.N.Y.	reversed
Northwestern Mutual Life Insurance Company v. Johnson	96 (1920)	Holmes	none	none	8th Cir.	certification
Harris v. Bell	103 (1920)	VanDevanter	none	none	8th Cir.	affirmed
Underwood Typewriter Company v. Chamberlain	113 (1920)	Brnadeis	none	none	Conn. Super. Ct.	affirmed
Watson v. State Comptroller of New York	122 (1920)	Brandeis	none	none	N.Y. County Sur. Ct.	affirmed
International Bridge Company v. New York	126 (1920)	Holmes	none	none	N.Y. Sup. Ct.	affirmed
Horning v. District of Columbia	135 (1920)	Holmes	none	Brandeis	D.C. Cir.	affirmed
Rock Island, Arkansas & Louisiana Railroad Company v. United States	141 (1920)	Holmes	none	none	Ct. Cl.	affirmed
The Coca-Cola Company v. Koke Company of America	143 (1920)	Holmes	none	none	9th Cir.	reversed
United States v. Nederlandsch-Americaansche Stoomvaart Maatschappij	148 (1920)	Day	none	none	Ct. Cl.	reversed
Berlin Mills Company v. Procter and Gamble Company	156 (1920)	Day	none	none	2d Cir.	reversed
De Rees v. Costaguta	166 (1920)	Day	none	none	S.D.N.Y.	dismissed
Wells Fargo and Company v. Taylor	175 (1920)	VanDevanter	none	none	5th Cir.	reversed
Jin Fuey Moy v. United States	189 (1920)	Pitney	none	none	W.D. Pa.	affirmed
Chicago, Milwaukee & St. Paul Railway Company v. Des Moines Union Railway Company	196 (1920)	Pitney	none	none	8th Cir.	multiple
Nicchia v. New York	228 (1920)	McReynolds	none	none	King's County Ct	affirmed
Bothwell v. United States	231 (1920)	McReynolds	none	none	Ct. Cl.	affirmed
Sampliner v. Motion Picture Patents Company	233 (1920)	McReynolds	none	none	2d Cir.	reversed
Great Western Serum Company v. United States	240 (1920)	McReynolds	none	none	Ct. Cl.	affirmed
Thames Towboat Company v. The Francis McDonald	242 (1920)	McReynolds	none	none	S.D.N.Y.	affirmed
Ana Maria Sugar Company, Inc. v. Quinones	245 (1920)	Brandeis	none	none	1st Cir.	affirmed
United States v. Northern Pacific Railroad Company	251 (1920)	Brandeis	none	none	8th Cir.	reversed
United States v. Lehigh Valley Railroad Company	255 (1920)	Clarke	none	none	S.D.N.Y.	reversed
Haupt v. United States	272 (1920)	Clarke	none	none	Ct. Cl.	affirmed
United States v. Wheeler	281 (1920)	White	none	none	D. Ariz.	affirmed
Walls v. Midland Carbon Company	300 (1920)	McKenna	none	none	D. Wy.	reversed
Gilbert v. Minnesota	325 (1920)	McKenna	none	Brandeis	Minn.	affirmed
United States ex rel. Hall v. Payne	343 (1920)	McKenna	none	none	D.C. Cir.	affirmed
Vallely v. Northern Fire and Marine Insurance Company	348 (1920)	McKenna	none	none	8th Cir.	certification
Galveston, Harrisburg and San Antonio Railway Company v. Woodbury	357 (1920)	Brandeis	none	none	Tex. Civ. App.	reversed
Thornton v. Duffy	361 (1920)	McKenna	White	none	Ohio	affirmed
Minneapolis, St. Paul and Sault Ste. Marie Railroad Company v. Washburn Lignite Coal Company	370 (1920)	VanDevanter	none	none	N.D. Dist. Ct.	dismissed
Minneapolis, St. Paul and Sault Ste. Marie Railroad Company v. C.L. Merrick Company	376 (1920)	VanDevanter	none	none	N.D. Dist. Ct.	dismissed
Arndstein v. McCarthy II	379 (1920)	McReynolds	none	none	S.D.N.Y.	reargument denied
Marshall v. New York	380 (1920)	Brandeis	none	none	2d Cir.	affirmed
Cochran v. United States	387 (1921)	McKenna	none	none	Ct. Cl.	affirmed
Erie Railroad Company v. Board of Public Utility Commissioners of New Jersey	394 (1921)	Holmes	none	none	N.J.	affirmed
Southern Pacific Company v. Berkshire	415 (1921)	Holmes	none	Clarke	Tex. Civ. App.	reversed
Atwater v. Guernsey	423 (1921)	Holmes	none	none	2d Cir.	affirmed
National Brake and Electric Company v. Christensen	425 (1921)	Day	none	none	7th Cir.	reversed
Sullivan v. Kidd	433 (1921)	Day	none	none	D. Kan.	reversed
Duplex Printing Press Company v. Deering	443 (1921)	Pitney	none	Brandeis	2d Cir.	reversed
Bracht v. San Antonio and Aransas Pass Railway Company	489 (1921)	McReynolds	none	none	Mo. Ct. App.	affirmed
United States v. Strang	491 (1921)	McReynolds	none	none	S.D. Fla.	affirmed
Mangan v. United States	494 (1921)	Clarke	none	none	Ct. Cl.	affirmed
Director General of Railroads v. The Viscose Company	498 (1921)	Clarke	none	none	3d Cir.	certification
J.W. Goldsmith, Jr.-Grant Company v. United States	505 (1921)	McKenna	none	none	N.D. Ga.	affirmed
Bullock v. Florida ex rel. Railroad Commission of Florida	513 (1921)	Holmes	none	none	Fla.	affirmed
Ex parte Muir	522 (1921)	VanDevanter	none	none	D.N.J.	mandamus denied
St. Louis and San Francisco Railway Company v. Public Service Commission of Missouri	535 (1921)	McReynolds	none	none	Mo.	reversed
Pere Marquette Railway Company v. J.F. French and Company	538 (1921)	Brandeis	none	none	Mich.	reversed
Louie v. United States	548 (1921)	Brandeis	none	none	9th Cir.	reversed
Panama Railroad Company v. Pigott	552 (1921)	Holmes	none	none	5th Cir.	affirmed
Central Union Trust Company v. Garvan	554 (1921)	Holmes	none	none	2d Cir.	affirmed
La Motte v. United States	570 (1921)	VanDevanter	none	none	8th Cir.	affirmed
The Journal and Tribune Company v. United States	581 (1921)	Pitney	none	none	Ct. Cl.	affirmed
Jackson v. Smith	586 (1921)	Brandeis	none	none	D.C. Cir.	reversed
Geddes v. Anaconda Copper Mining Company	590 (1921)	Clarke	none	none	9th Cir.	reversed
