= Farid-Es-Sultaneh v. Commissioner =

- Court: United States Court of Appeals for the Second Circuit
- Full case name: Farid-Es-Sultaneh v. Commissioner of Internal Revenue
- Decided: April 11, 1947
- Citation: 160 F.2d 812 (2d Cir. 1947)

Court membership
- Judges sitting: Thomas Walter Swan, Harrie B. Chase, Charles Edward Clark

Case opinions
- Majority: Chase, joined by Swan
- Dissent: Clark

Farid-Es-Sultaneh v. Commissioner, 160 F.2d 812 (2d Cir. 1947) is a United States federal income tax case. It is notable (and thus appears frequently in law school casebooks) for the following holding:

- Appreciated property, transferred to a wife pursuant to an antenuptial agreement, was not a gift, but was consideration for which she sold her inchoate marital rights.
- This applies the general rule, that a taxpayer recognizes a gain on the transfer of appreciated property in satisfaction of a legal obligation.
- Therefore, the property's basis in her hands was not a "carryover" (gift) basis from her husband. Instead, the court set its basis at its fair market value.

== Facts ==
The taxpayer-wife sold stock which she had received from her husband, S. S. Kresge, pursuant to an antenuptial agreement, under which she accepted the shares in consideration for surrendering all marital property rights in her husband's estate. (When they married, she was 32 years old; he was 57 years old and worth approximately $375,000,000 and owned real estate of the approximate value of $100,000,000.) The stock had a basis in the husband's hands of 15 cents a share, but a fair market value of $10 a share when transferred to her.

The Commissioner contended that the taxpayer's basis in the shares was the same as her husband's--15 cents—because the shares had been received by her as a "gift," as used in Sec. 113(a) (2) of the Revenue Act of 1936. The taxpayer sued, arguing the transfer from husband to wife was not a gift for income tax purposes, but an exchange of valuable property interests—stock for marital property rights—such that her basis for the shares should be $10, their fair market value at the date transferred.

== Issue ==
"The problem presented by this petition is to fix the cost basis to be used by the petitioner in determining the taxable gain on a sale she made in 1938 of shares of corporate stock. She contends that it is the adjusted value of the shares at the date she acquired them because her acquisition was by purchase. The Commissioner's position is that she must use the adjusted cost basis of her transferor because her acquisition was by gift."

== Holding ==
There was sufficient consideration, underlying the taxpayer's receipt of the corporate stock pursuant to an antenuptial contract in exchange for relinquishing her inchoate interest in her affianced husband's property, because this inchoate interest greatly exceeded the value of the stock transferred to her. Hence she did not acquire the stock by “gift”, and need not take her husband's cost basis in determining her taxable gain on subsequent sale of the stock. Revenue Act 1938 §113(a)(2), 26 U.S.C.Int.Rev.Acts, page 1048.

== Academic Commentary ==
The Farid and Davis decisions are undoubtedly defensible in terms of the realization criterion: in general, transfers of property in satisfaction of contract obligations, fixed or disputed, are taxable events, with the amount realized being measured by the value of the property transferred. But as against the larger Code policy embodied in the gift exclusion--§102 and its corollary, §1015—the cases seem misguided, or at least doubtful, in result.

- If property transfers between spouses are "gifts" when they take place during marriage (with the result that the basis of the property in the transferor's hands carries over to the transferee), it is difficult to see why transfers which are prompted by the formation of the marital unit should be treated differently.
- And if transfers from deceased husbands to surviving widows are viewed as non-realization events even though the marital relationship thus comes to an end [under the exemption for life insurance payouts], it is hard to see why a realization should be deemed to occur when the marriage is terminated through divorce.

The presence of a contract obligation, though it otherwise justifies a finding of taxable event, seems insufficient on the whole to remove pre-marital and (much more important) post-marital property arrangements from the ambit of the gift provisions. Quite obviously, family wealth is being divided between husband and wife in both instances, and it is this circumstance—rather than the presence of "consideration" in Farid or of arm's length dealing in Davis—that ought to govern the tax outcome.

- This logic explains why Congress in 1984 added §1041, which provides that a transfer of property between spouses, or between former spouses where the transfer is incident to divorce, shall be treated as a "gift" for income tax purposes.
