= United States v. Wheeler =

United States v. Wheeler may refer to several Supreme Court cases:

- United States v. Wheeler (1920), 254 U.S. 281, a kidnapping case
- United States v. Wheeler (1978), 435 U.S. 313, a tribal sovereignty case
