= Atkinson v. Sinclair Refining Co. =

- Supreme Court of the United States

Decided June 18, 1962
- Full case name: Atkinson v. Sinclair Refining Co.
- Citations: 370 U.S. 238 (more)

Holding
- When a union is liable for damages for violation of the no-strike clause, its officers and members are not liable for these damages.

Court membership
- Chief Justice Earl Warren Associate Justices Hugo Black · Felix Frankfurter; William O. Douglas · Tom C. Clark; John M. Harlan II · William J. Brennan Jr. Potter Stewart · Byron White

Case opinion
- Majority: White, joined by unanimous
- Frankfurter took no part in the consideration or decision of the case.

Laws applied
- Taft-Hartley Act

Atkinson v. Sinclair Refining Co., 370 U.S. 238 (1962), was a United States Supreme Court case in which the court held that, when a union is liable for damages for violation of the no-strike clause, its officers and members are not liable for these damages.

== Significance ==
In this case, the court recognized Section 301 of the Taft-Hartley Act as a Congressional abrogation of the Danbury Hatters' Case.
