= Wood v. Georgia (1962) =

- Supreme Court of the United States

Argued March 29, 1962 Decided June 25, 1962
- Full case name: James I. Wood v. Georgia
- Citations: 370 U.S. 375 (more)

Holding
- Passionate criticism of a general grand jury investigation does not constitute an imminent threat to obstruct justice

Court membership
- Chief Justice Earl Warren Associate Justices Hugo Black · Felix Frankfurter; William O. Douglas · Tom C. Clark; John M. Harlan II · William J. Brennan Jr. Potter Stewart · Byron White

Case opinions
- Majority: Warren, joined by Black, Douglas, Brennan, Stewart
- Dissent: Harlan, joined by Clark
- Frankfurter and White took no part in the consideration or decision of the case.

Wood v. Georgia, 370 U.S. 375 (1962), was a case in which the Supreme Court of the United States held that strongly-worded criticism of an ongoing grand jury investigation does not constitute a clear and present danger.

== Background ==
During an election campaign, a Superior Court judge in Bibb County, Georgia announced to the news media that a grand jury assembled to investigate alleged bloc voting by black residents. The judge also alleged that candidates engaged in corruption by promising large sums of money to black voters.

In response, Sheriff James Woods condemned the investigation as a way to spark racial tensions and to intimidate black voters. Shortly after, Woods was convicted of contempt on the basis that his statements constituted a "clear, present and imminent danger" to the enforcement of the law.

== Decision ==
In a 5-2 decision, Chief Justice Earl Warren delivered the Court's opinion that Woods' arrest clearly violated the First Amendment. The Court argued that justice was not obstructed because the investigation focused on a general issue without specific indictments, and that his criticism was not entirely unsubstantiated.

=== Dissent ===
Justice Harlan, joined by Justice Clark, dissented. Harlan argued that Woods intended to influence an open investigation. Therefore, his contempt conviction should have been upheld.
