= NLRB v. Washington Aluminum Co. =

NLRB v. Washington Aluminium Co.
- Supreme Court of the United States

Argued April 10, 1962 Decided May 28, 1962
- Full case name: National Labor Relations Board v. Washington Aluminum Company
- Citations: 370 U.S. 9 (more) 82 S. Ct. 1099; 8 L. Ed. 2d 298

Case history
- Prior: Washington Aluminum Co., Inc., 128 NLRB 643 (1960); Enforcement denied, NLRB v. Washington Aluminum Co., 291 F.2d 869 (4th Cir. 1961); Cert. granted, 368 U.S. 924 (1961)

Holding
- Unorganized workers have the right to engage in concerted activity over working conditions without making a prior specific demand.

Court membership
- Chief Justice Earl Warren Associate Justices Hugo Black · Felix Frankfurter; William O. Douglas · Tom C. Clark; John M. Harlan II · William J. Brennan Jr. Potter Stewart · Byron White

Case opinion
- Majority: Black, joined by Warren, Douglas, Clark, Harlan, Brennan, Stewart
- Frankfurter, White took no part in the consideration or decision of the case.

Laws applied
- National Labor Relations Act

NLRB v. Washington Aluminium Co., 370 U.S. 9 (1962), was a US labor law related Supreme Court ruling concerning the right of workers to engage in protected concerted activity. Section 7 of the National Labor Relations Act gives employees the right to "engage in other concerted activities for the purpose of collective bargaining or other mutual aid or protection." The Supreme Court ruled that a walk-out was protected activity even if workers did not present "a specific demand upon their employer to remedy a condition they found objectionable."

== Background ==
Washington Aluminium operated an aluminium fabrication facility in Baltimore, Maryland. The machine shop employed eight workers and one foreman. Employees had complained of the cold temperature prior to January 5, 1959, when the night watchmen was unable to start the gas furnace, which served as the shop's primary source of heat, on a particularly cold day. The seven employees decided to leave for the day. The seven employees were fired that day. The National Labor Relations Board ruled that the employee walk out was a protected form of protest under the National Labor Relations Act's section 7, which protects the rights of workers regardless of whether they are in a union to engage in group activity to improve their working conditions, ordering the company to reinstate the workers. The Fourth Circuit Court of Appeals ruled that the walk out was not protected because, although the employees left because of the cold, they did not make a specific demand to their employer.

== Opinion of the Court ==
In a majority opinion written by Justice Hugo Black, the court overturned the lower court's ruling, arguing that the language defining protected concerted activity "is broad enough to protect concerted activities whether they take place before, after, or at the same time such a demand is made." The opinion also ruled that the workers' prior complaints about temperature in the winter constituted a labor dispute as defined by the National Labor Relations Act.

== See also ==
- United States labor law
- List of United States Supreme Court cases by the Warren Court
