= List of United States Supreme Court cases, volume 370 =

This is a list of all the United States Supreme Court cases from volume 370 of the United States Reports:

Case name	Citation	Date decided
Enochs v. Williams Packing & Nav. Co.	370 U.S. 1	1962
NLRB v. Washington Aluminum Co.	370 U.S. 9	1962
Sunkist Growers, Inc. v. Winckler & Smith Citrus Prod. Co.	370 U.S. 19	1962
Salen v. U.S. Lines Co.	370 U.S. 31	1962
Beard v. Stahr	370 U.S. 41	1962
Watkins v. City of Wilson	370 U.S. 46	1962
Fass v. New Jersey	370 U.S. 47	1962
Busby v. Harris	370 U.S. 48	1962
Gallegos v. Colorado	370 U.S. 49	1962
United States v. Davis (1962)	370 U.S. 65	1962
Lehigh Valley Coop. Farmers, Inc. v. United States	370 U.S. 76	1962
Calbeck v. Travelers Ins. Co.	370 U.S. 114	1962
Lanza v. New York	370 U.S. 139	1962
Taylor v. Louisiana (1962)	370 U.S. 154	1962
Creek Nation v. United States	370 U.S. 157	1962
Holden v. Pioneer Broad. Co.	370 U.S. 157	1962
Jefferson Lake Sulphur Co. v. New Jersey	370 U.S. 158	1962
Porter v. Aetna Cas. & Sur. Co.	370 U.S. 159	1962
Morales v. City of Galveston	370 U.S. 165	1962
Marine Eng'rs v. Interlake S.S. Co.	370 U.S. 173	1962
W.M.C.A., Inc. v. Simon	370 U.S. 190	1962
Sinclair Refining Co. v. Atkinson	370 U.S. 195	1962
In re McConnell	370 U.S. 230	1962
Atkinson v. Sinclair Refining Co.	370 U.S. 238	1962
Drake Bakeries Inc. v. Bakery Workers	370 U.S. 254	1962
Rudolph v. United States	370 U.S. 269	1962
Grumman v. United States	370 U.S. 288	1962
Kansas City & S.R.R. Co. v. Reily	370 U.S. 288	1962
Cepero v. Puerto Rico	370 U.S. 289	1962
Valenzuela v. Eyman	370 U.S. 290	1962
Patskan v. Buchkoe	370 U.S. 290	1962
Hall v. Heard	370 U.S. 291	1962
Wilbur v. United States	370 U.S. 291	1962
Milutin v. Bouchard	370 U.S. 292	1962
Seelig v. United States	370 U.S. 293	1962
Brown Shoe Co. v. United States	370 U.S. 294	1962
Wood v. Georgia	370 U.S. 375	1962
United States v. Wise	370 U.S. 405	1962
Engel v. Vitale	370 U.S. 421	1962
State Bd. of Ins. v. Todd Shipyards Corp.	370 U.S. 451	1962
United States v. Borden Co.	370 U.S. 460	1962
Manual Enters., Inc. v. Day	370 U.S. 478	1962
Glidden Co. v. Zdanok	370 U.S. 530	1962
Central R.R. Co. v. Pennsylvania	370 U.S. 607	1962
Link v. Wabash R.R. Co.	370 U.S. 626	1962
Gilbert v. United States	370 U.S. 650	1962
Robinson v. California	370 U.S. 660	1962
Continental Ore Co. v. Union Carbide & Carbon Corp.	370 U.S. 690	1962
Teamsters v. Yellow Transit Freight Lines, Inc.	370 U.S. 711	1962
Idlewild Bon Voyage Liquor Corp. v. Epstein	370 U.S. 713	1962
Silber v. United States	370 U.S. 717	1962
United States v. Kniss	370 U.S. 719	1962
United States v. Stanley (1962)	370 U.S. 719	1962
City Cent. Motel, Inc. v. Florida Hotel & Rest. Comm'n	370 U.S. 720	1962
Wasilewski v. Board of Sch. Dirs.	370 U.S. 720	1962
Winters v. Ohio	370 U.S. 721	1962
Olen v. Olen	370 U.S. 721	1962
Elchuk v. United States	370 U.S. 722	1962
Marakar v. United States	370 U.S. 723	1962
Hartman v. United States	370 U.S. 724	1962
Allen v. Bannan	370 U.S. 725	1962
Louisiana ex rel. Washington v. Walker	370 U.S. 726	1962
Gilliam v. United States	370 U.S. 727	1962
Whitus v. Balkcom	370 U.S. 728	1962
