= Loewe v. Lawlor =

- Supreme Court of the United States

Argued December 4–5, 1907 Decided February 3, 1908
- Full case name: Deitrich Loewe et al. v. Martin Lawlor et al.
- Citations: 208 U.S. 274 (more) 28 S. Ct. 301; 52 L. Ed. 488; 1908 U.S. LEXIS 1769

Case history
- Prior: Certiorari to the Circuit Court of Appeals for the Second Circuit

Holding
- (1) The Sherman Antitrust Act prohibits any combination whatever to secure action which essentially obstructs the free flow of commerce between the states, or restricts the liberty of a trader to engage in business. (2) Individual unionists can be held personally liable for damages incurred by the activities of their union.

Court membership
- Chief Justice Melville Fuller Associate Justices John M. Harlan · David J. Brewer; Edward D. White · Rufus W. Peckham; Joseph McKenna · Oliver W. Holmes Jr. William R. Day · William H. Moody

Case opinion
- Majority: Fuller, joined by unanimous

Laws applied
- Sherman Antitrust Act
- Abrogated by
- Taft-Hartley Act, Section 301

Loewe v. Lawlor, 208 U.S. 274 (1908), also referred to as the Danbury Hatters' Case, is a United States Supreme Court case in United States labor law concerning the application of antitrust laws to labor unions. The Court's decision effectively outlawed the secondary boycott as a violation of the Sherman Antitrust Act, despite union arguments that their actions affected only intrastate commerce. It was also decided that individual unionists could be held personally liable for damages incurred by the activities of their union.

== Facts ==
In 1901, D. E. Loewe & Company, a fur hat manufacturer, declared itself an open shop. It was the third open shop ever established in Danbury, Connecticut, the center of the pelt industry since 1780 (see North American fur trade). Loewe's declaration sparked a strike and a boycott by the United Hatters of North America (UHU), which had organized 70 out of 82 firms in the hat manufacturing industry. The nationwide boycott was assisted by the American Federation of Labor (AFL) and was successful in persuading retailers, wholesalers and customers not to buy from or do business with Loewe. The goal of the operation was for UHU to gain union recognition as the bargaining agent for employees at Loewe & Co.

Loewe & Co. sued the union for violating the Sherman Antitrust Act, alleging that UHU's boycott interfered with Loewe's ability to engage in the interstate commerce of selling hats. The act had been adopted in 1890, with the primary purpose to control business monopolies. The appellee in the case was Martin Lawlor, the business agent for the UHU, but the list of defendants included 240 union members.

The case was handled in the first instance by the United States Circuit Court for the District of Connecticut, which dismissed the suit on the grounds that the alleged actions fell outside the scope of the Sherman Act. Loewe & Co. appealed to the United States Court of Appeals for the Second Circuit, which certified the case to the Supreme Court.

== Judgment ==
In a unanimous decision written by Chief Justice Melville Fuller, the UHU was found to have been acting in restraint of interstate commerce and to have violated the Sherman Antitrust Act. Fuller began the opinion by recounting the relevant provisions of the Sherman Act. The first, second, and seventh section of the act can be concisely described as follows:

1. Every contract, combination in the form of trust or otherwise, or conspiracy, in restraint of trade or commerce among the several States, or with foreign nations, is illegal.

2. Every person who monopolizes, or attempts to monopolize, or combine or conspire with any other person or persons, to monopolize any part of the trade or commerce among the several States, or with foreign nations, is in violation of the statute.

3. Any person who is injured in his business or property by any other person or corporation by reason of anything forbidden or declared illegal by the act may sue in federal court in the district of the defendant and recover three fold damages.

Fuller concluded that the actions of the union did constitute unlawful combination of the type described in the act: "In our opinion, the combination described in the declaration is a combination 'in restraint of trade or commerce among the several States,' in the sense in which those words are used in the act, and the action can be maintained accordingly."

The decision in the Danbury Hatters' case rankled the organized labor movement for many years.

The union had raised a number of objections to the application of the act to its activities, all of which were found to be untenable by the Court. While the union had not interfered with the transportation of hats originating with Loewe & Co., a national boycott conceived on the initiative of the union that comprised vendees in other states was a violation of interstate commerce as proscribed by the statute:

If the purposes of the combination were, as alleged, to prevent any interstate transportation at all, the fact that the means operated at one end before physical transportation commenced, and at the other end after the physical transportation ended, was immaterial. And that conclusion rests on many judgments of this court, to the effect that the act prohibits any combination whatever to secure action which essentially obstructs the free flow of commerce between the States, or restricts, in that regard, the liberty of a trader to engage in business.

The fact that the union was not itself engaged in interstate commerce was irrelevant since the act did not distinguish between the types of associations involved but simply forbade every contract, combination, or conspiracy in restraint of trade. Fuller underscored that no exemption had been made for organizations of laborers or farmers, despite lobbying to include such language in the statute:

The records of Congress show that several efforts were made to exempt, by legislation, organizations of farmers and laborers from the operation of the act, and that all these efforts failed, so that the act remained as we have it before us.

Consequently, while the boycott and strike action had originated in a single state, the combination efforts had to be viewed in aggregation:

(...) [T]he acts must be considered as a whole, and the plan is open to condemnation notwithstanding a negligible amount of intrastate business might be affected in carrying it out.

The judgment of dismissal was reversed, and the case was remanded for further proceedings.

== Significance ==
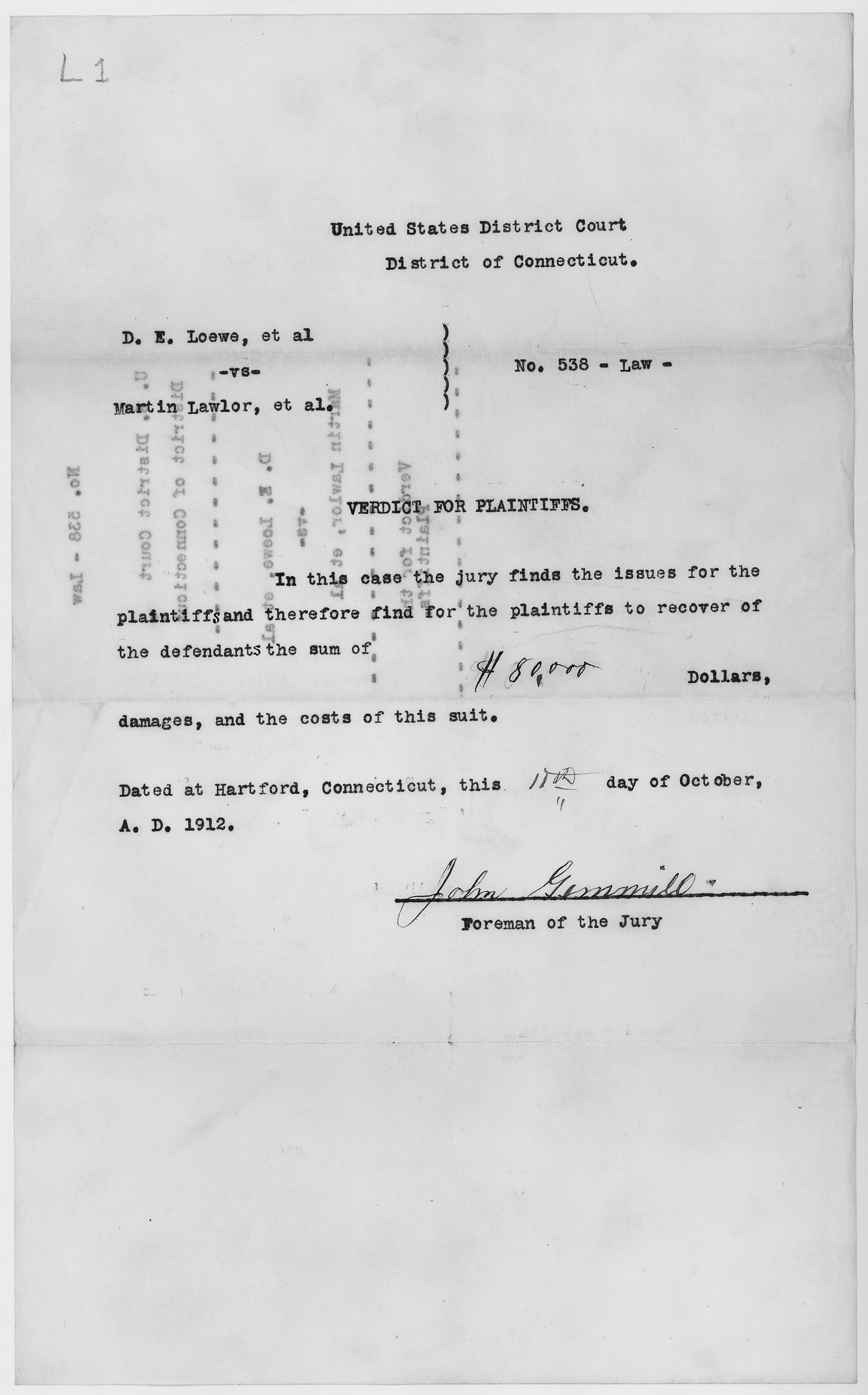
Verdict for the plaintiffs in the Loewe v. Lawlor case

In 1909, a new trial was held in the District Court to determine the outcome of the case. The presiding judge directed the jury to find for Loewe & Co., in accordance with the Supreme Court decision. The jury returned with a verdict of $74,000 in damages, which was tripled, under the Sherman Act, to $222,000. The union won on appeal but then lost on retrial in 1912. The case reached the Supreme Court in 1914, and in Lawlor v. Loewe (1915), the Court again held the union liable for damages. In 1917, the case was settled for slightly over $234,000 (approximately $3.9 million in 2009 currency) of which the AFL was able to obtain $216,000 in voluntary contributions from union members.

The ruling deprived labor unions of an important and effective union tactic, and the decision to hold individual union members personally liable for damages had an adverse impact on union organizing efforts. That led the AFL to initiate an aggressive campaign to convince Congress to address labor concerns about the Sherman Act in the reform of antitrust laws. The push culminated with the passage of the Clayton Antitrust Act of 1914, which provided that "the labor of a human being is not a commodity or an article of commerce." Section 20 of the act further stated that no injunctions should be granted by federal courts in labor disputes "unless necessary to prevent irreparable injury to property, or to a property right." The provisions, however, were narrowly interpreted by the Supreme Court, which ruled, in Duplex Printing Press Company v. Deering (1921), that the exemptions in the Clayton Act did not protect secondary boycotts from judicial control.

Prosecution of labor under antitrust laws would continue until the enactment of the Norris–La Guardia Act in 1932, which included express exemptions of organized labor from antitrust injunctions. The exemptions were upheld by the Supreme Court in United States v. Hutcheson (1941), which stated that the act should be read broadly to provide a total antitrust exemption for labor unions, "so long as [the] union acts in its self-interest and does not combine with non-labor groups." The majority opinion in Hutcheson was written by Felix Frankfurter, who, before becoming a Supreme Court Justice, had served as one of the drafters of the Norris-La Guardia Act.

Congress abrogated the holding in this case with the Taft-Hartley Act of 1947. Subsequently, the Supreme Court recognized this abrogation in cases like Atkinson v. Sinclair Refining Co., which held that unionists were not individually liable for damages related to wildcat strikes.

== See also ==
- United States labor law
- Labor history of the United States
- Albany International BV v Stichting Bedrijfspensioenfonds Textielindustrie [1999] ECR I-5751 (C-67/96)
- Mogul Steamship Co Ltd v McGregor, Gow & Co [1892] AC 25
