= 42 U.S.C. § 652(k) =

United States law

42 U.S.C. § 652(k) is a United States law which sometimes requires the denial or revocation of passports for individuals who fail to pay child support. The law was enacted as part of the Personal Responsibility and Work Opportunity Act in 1996.

== Legislative history ==
In 1996 the United States Congress passed the Personal Responsibility and Work Opportunity Reconciliation Act of 1996 (PRWORA). Congress sought to eliminate entitlements, or cash welfare, to individuals that were disbursed as part of Title IV-A of the Social Security Act. Instead, Congress preferred block grants be disbursed to states as part of a program it called TANF or Temporary Assistance to Needy Families. According to the House Ways and Means Committee (Report 104-15), "The major goal of Public Law 104–193 is to reduce the length of welfare spells by attacking dependency while simultaneously preserving the function of welfare as a safety net for families experiencing temporary financial problems." As part of this effort, Congress attempted to improve child support collection rates with the hope that single parent families would move off welfare rolls and remain self-sufficient. According to the Conference Report (Report 104-725) "It is the sense of the Senate that — (a) States should diligently continue their efforts to enforce child support payments by the non-custodial parent to the custodial parent, regardless of the employment status or location of the non-custodial parent."

The reformed child support program pursued five major goals: automating many child support enforcement procedures; establishing uniform tracking procedures; strengthening interstate child support enforcement; requiring states to adopt stronger measures to establish paternity; and creating stronger enforcement tools to increase child support collections. Congress designed the law to encourage states to have similar child support laws, to help states share information through the Federal child support office, to process routine information, and to handle interstate cases quickly.

Section III (Child Support), Subtitle G (Enforcement of Child Support) contained 14 enforcement measures to improve the collection of child support, including Denial of Passports for Nonpayment of Child Support in Section 370. Under Section 370, 42 U.S.C. § 652(k)(2) was amended so that the "Secretary of State shall, upon certification by the Secretary transmitted under paragraph (1), refuse to issue a passport to such individual, and may revoke, restrict, or limit a passport issued previously to such individual." None of three committee reports on record commented on the rationale for making passport revocation, restriction or limitation discretionary by using the word "may".

The State Department adopted a policy of refusing to issue passports to individuals whose child support payments were $5,000 ($2500.00 in Ca) or more in arrears, but it did not have the resources to revoke the existing passports of such individuals. An individual had to apply for "new passport services" to come to the attention of the State Department. "New services" also included services such as the addition of pages to a passport.

== Procedural due process protections ==
Procedural due process protections are outlined in 42 U.S.C. 654(31)(A). This section states the prerequisites to passport denial or restrictions under 42 U.S.C. § 652. It reads: "(A) each individual concerned is afforded notice of such determination and the consequences thereof, and an opportunity to contest the determination". The language does not require a final ruling on contested determinations, only that "notice and opportunity" be given. The Family Support Act of 1988 also required that in any judicial or administrative proceeding for the award of child support there shall be a rebuttable presumption that the child support resulting from the state's guideline is the correct amount of child support to be awarded.

The Personal Responsibility and Work Opportunity Act also allows liens to be placed on the non-custodial parent's assets to effectuate collection of child support. But due process safeguards on passport denials are less strict than those on placing liens. The passport denial law requires "notice and opportunity" but placing a lien requires an additional level of due process. Before a lien may be placed, an "opportunity for an appeal on the record to an independent administrative or judicial tribunal" must be made available.

45 C.F.R. § 303.35(a) (2001) also requires that each state have in place "an administrative complaint procedure ... to allow individuals the opportunity to request an administrative review" to correct errors made by state child support enforcement agencies.

== Legislative intent ==
The purpose of PRWORA is to reduce federal welfare expenditures, but the enhanced enforcement measures under Section 370 are not limited to TANF. Section 301 amends Section 654 to allow enhanced enforcement for "any other child, if an individual applies for such services with respect to the child" even if the custodial parent is not receiving TANF funds for those other children. State child support agencies routinely do this on behalf of custodial parents because federal subsidies and performance incentives included in the bill encourage this practice. Many states have interpreted this section to require the state agency to apply for these benefits.

In 1975, federally funded child support collection mechanisms were first extended to parents that were not receiving AFDC (the predecessor to TANF) when part D of the Social Security Act was enacted as part of P.L. 93-647. Child support enforcement measures have been periodically enhanced since 1975. The legislative record on H.R. 3734 is silent on whether or why Congress intended to extend the federally funded, enhanced collection mechanisms to non-welfare recipients or if it even considered the issue. The House Ways and Means Committee estimated that the cost of extending these measures to non-TANF custodial parents exceeds $88 billion annually, while the amount of child support payments targeted in the legislation was $34 billion.

== Subsequent history ==
There have been several modifications to the passport denial provision, as well as a few unsuccessful attempts at reform. P.L. 106-113 (1999) required the Secretary of State to submit a report to Congress on the feasibility of lowering the threshold amount of an individual's support arrearage from $5,000 to $2,500. In 2000, the George W. Bush administration proposed reducing the threshold to $2,500 in a bill known as the "Child Support Enforcement Enhancement Amendments of 2000" but it was never introduced. Three bills were subsequently introduced modifying the passport restrictions. 108 H.R. 4859 (2004) attempted to reduce the threshold to $2,500 but never became law. The Deficit Reduction Act of 2005 (P.L. 109-171) Section 7303 reduced the arrearage amount required to trigger a passport denial from $5,000 to $2,500. In 2007, 110 H.R. 491 was introduced to make revocation mandatory rather than discretionary, but this bill also never became law. In 2009, 111 H.R. 2723 was introduced to "provide for an exemption to allow an individual otherwise ineligible to travel outside the United States to do so for employment purposes to pay child support arrearages, and for other purposes " As of December 2009, it awaits further action.

The enforcement provisions affecting U.S. passports have thus far survived Constitutional challenges in Weinstein v. Albright (2001), Eunique v. Powell (2002), In re James K. Walker (2002), Dept of Revenue v. Nesbitt (2008), Risenhoover v. Washington (2008), Borracchini v. Jones (2009), and Dewald v Clinton (2010).
