= Boys Markets, Inc. v. Retail Clerks Union, Local 770 =

- Supreme Court of the United States

Decided June 1, 1970
- Full case name: Boys Markets, Inc. v. Retail Clerks Union, Local 770
- Citations: 398 U.S. 235 (more)

Holding
- Injunctive relief for a violation of a no-strike clause does not necessarily violate the NLRA or the NLA. The federal court must order the employer to submit the matter to arbitration as a condition of ordering the relief.

Court membership
- Chief Justice Warren E. Burger Associate Justices Hugo Black · William O. Douglas; John M. Harlan II · William J. Brennan Jr. Potter Stewart · Byron White; Thurgood Marshall

Case opinions
- Majority: Brennan
- Concurrence: Stewart
- Dissent: Black

Laws applied
- National Labor Relations Act; Norris–LaGuardia Act
- This case overturned a previous ruling or rulings
- Sinclair Refining Co. v. Atkinson

Boys Markets, Inc. v. Retail Clerks Union, Local 770, 398 U.S. 235 (1970), was a United States Supreme Court case in which the court held that injunctive relief for a violation of a no-strike clause does not necessarily violate the NLRA or the NLA. The federal court must order the employer to submit the matter to arbitration as a condition of ordering the relief.

== Background ==
Boys Markets and a local chapter of the Retail Clerks Union were parties to a collective bargaining agreement containing a provision that all controversies concerning its interpretation or application should be resolved by arbitration and that there should be no work stoppage, lockout, picketing, or boycotts during the life of the contract. A dispute arose and, when Boys Markets did not accede to union demands, a labor strike was called and the union began to picket Boys Markets' establishment. Boys Markets' effort to invoke the contract's arbitration procedures being unsuccessful, it sought injunctive relief in the state court, which issued a temporary restraining order. The union removed the case to the federal District Court, which ordered arbitration and enjoined the strike and the picketing. The Ninth Circuit Court of Appeals reversed, considering itself bound by Sinclair Refining Co. v. Atkinson, which held that Section 4 of the Norris–La Guardia Act bars a federal district court from enjoining a strike in breach of a no-strike clause in a collective bargaining agreement, even though that agreement contains binding arbitration provisions enforceable under Section 301(a) of the Labor Management Relations Act.

== Opinion of the court ==
The Supreme Court issued an opinion on June 1, 1970. In Avco Corp. v. Machinists, the Supreme Court held that a suit for breach of a collective bargaining agreement can be removed to federal court under federal question jurisdiction. Once a case is removed to federal court, it must obey federal procedural law. Sinclair combined with Avco Corp. meant that a labor dispute case could be filed in a state court where an injunction could have been issued but immediately be removed to a federal court prohibited from issuing an injunction. In Boys Market, the Supreme Court described this as "anomalous." The court overruled Sinclair.
