= Gilbert v. Minnesota =

- Supreme Court of the United States

Argued November 10, 1920 Decided December 13, 1920
- Full case name: Joseph Gilbert v. State of Minnesota
- Citations: 254 U.S. 325 (more) 41 S. Ct. 125

Case history
- Prior: 141 Minn. 263

Holding
- A State does not violate the First Amendment when it imposes criminal penalties for a speech criticizing government policy.

Court membership
- Chief Justice Edward D. White Associate Justices Joseph McKenna · Oliver W. Holmes Jr. William R. Day · Willis Van Devanter; Mahlon Pitney · James C. McReynolds; Louis Brandeis · John H. Clarke

Case opinions
- Majority: McKenna, joined by Holmes
- Dissent: Brandeis
- Dissent: White

Laws applied
- U.S. Const. amend. I
- Overruled by
- Gitlow v. New York

Gilbert v. Minnesota, 254 U.S. 325, was a case heard and decided by the Supreme Court of the United States in 1920. The case concerned the right to freedom of speech. The Court held that while the First Amendment to the United States Constitution applies to the States, Minnesota's sedition act could stand.

== Background ==
Joseph Gilbert was born in England. In 1883, he moved to the United States, settling in Philadelphia and opening a carpet business. Successful but unsatisfied, Gilbert became a lawyer and was admitted to the Pennsylvania Bar Association. Still not content, Gilbert and his wife moved to Seattle, where he became involved with socialist politics and published a socialist newspaper.

In 1915, Gilbert joined the Nonpartisan League, which advocated for "state ownership of grain elevators, flour mills, packing houses and cold storage plants, state hail insurance, and the operation of rural credit banks at cost." The party was also opposed to U.S. involvement in World War I.

In August 1917, Gilbert gave a speech where he said, among other things:

We are going over to Europe to make the world safe for democracy, but I tell you we had better make America safe for democracy first. You say, what is the matter with our democracy? I tell you what is the matter with it: Have you had anything to say as to who should be President? Have you had anything to say as to who should be Governor of this state? Have you had anything to say as to whether we would go into this war? You know you have not. If this is such a good democracy, for Heaven's sake why should we not vote on conscription of men? We were stampeded into this war by newspaper rot to pull England's chestnuts out of the fire for her. I tell you if they conscripted wealth like they have conscripted men, this war would not last over forty-eight hours.

Gilbert was indicted, tried, and found guilty under a Minnesota law which made it illegal to "advocate or teach by word of mouth or otherwise that men should not enlist in the military or naval forces of the United States or the State of Minnesota." He was ordered to pay a $500 fine and to serve one year in jail. The Minnesota Supreme Court upheld his conviction. Gilbert appealed to the United States Supreme Court.

== Decision ==
Justice McKenna, writing for the majority, reasoned that the right to freedom of speech is not absolute. The majority held that Gilbert's speech did not advocate any policy or censure any action, both of which would have been protected by the First Amendment. The Court upheld his conviction.

Justice Brandeis dissented, arguing that the Minnesota statute was too broad and could criminalize constitutionally-protected beliefs. Furthermore, he argued that the right to freedom of speech was protected under the Fourteenth Amendment to the United States Constitution.

The decision has never been formally overruled, though modern First Amendment jurisprudence no longer aligns with the majority's analysis.
