= Protected concerted activity =

Protected concerted activity is a term of art in United States labor law that refers to the actions employees take to improve their working conditions that are protected from employer interference or retaliation under the National Labor Relations Act. These rights are found in Section 7 of the National Labor Relations Act (NLRA, or the Act), codified at 29 U.S.C. § 157, and are often referred to as Section 7 protections.

Generally speaking, there is protected concerted activity when two or more employees act together to improve the terms and conditions of their employment. Employees actions can be found to be protected and concerted even where there is no unionizing activity or union involved. An individual employee's protected actions can be seen as concerted when they are acting on behalf of other employees or bringing a group complaint to their employer. If employee actions do not rise to the level of protected, concerted activity it is said to be unprotected. Additionally, employees can lose their Section 7 protections even involved in protected, concerted activity when they engage illegal tactics or behavior.

== Protected activity ==
The purpose of the NLRA was to address the unequal bargaining power between employers and employees. The Act aims to extend the full right to freedom of association to employees seeking to unionize their workplace, or take group action to address conditions of their employment. The NLRA ensures workers protections by making it an unfair labor practice for employers to take adverse disciplinary action or retaliate against employees participating in protected concerted activity. When determining what activities workers may partake in without fear of employer retaliation, the Labor Board and courts often must balance the purpose of the act against an employer's property rights and economic interests.

To gain the protection of the Act, employees actions must be both protected and concerted. Section 7 of the Act expressly gives employees the right to:

- self-organize, by forming or attempting to form a union in the workplace;
- join a union, whether recognized by an employer or not; and
- bargain collectively with the employer through chosen representatives.

Additionally, NLRA grants workers protections when they "engage in other concerted activities for the purpose of...mutual aid or protection". This is where the term "protected concerted activity" comes from. The Act does not detail what other actives are covered by "mutual aid or protection". Subsequent decisions by the National Labor Relations Board, Appellate courts, and the U.S. Supreme Court have further defined what other activity is protected and concerted for the purposes of gaining Section 7 protections.

The test for what actions are mean to be protected asks what employee actions did Congress intend to protect under the NLRA. Employers have argued this should be textually interpreted to mean only activities directly related to unions and unionizing should be covered. However, the courts have generally used a more broad interpretation when looking at employee actions. Concerted activity to protest poor or unsafe working conditions even when there has been no union or unionizing activity involved are protected.

Concerted activity taken on behalf of non-employees is not protected activity. In the case of Orchard Park Health Care Ctr., 341 N.L.R.B. 642 (2004), the nursing home staff's concerns and complaints to their employer about the living conditions for their patients were not protected because their complaints were not for the mutual aid of employees.

== Concerted activity ==
Employees are typically seen to be working in concert if an employee is acting with, or acting as a representative of other employees and not solely for their own interests.

An individual employee addressing a personal complaint with their employer is most easily identifiable as non concerted activities. Additionally, an individual who walks off the job in protest of their personal work assignment is not protected.

Protected concerted activity has extended to individual employees in some situations. when an employee speaks individually to his or her employer on behalf of him or herself and one or more co-workers about improving workplace conditions. An individual employee who seeks to enforce a collective bargaining agreement will generally be deemed to be engaged in concerted activity.

Protected concerted activity extends to individual employees in some situations. Typically, an individual employee can be acting in concert when that employee is acting on behalf of or as a representative of at least one other co-worker. Their actions must address general workplace conditions or bring attention to a group complaint. An individual employee who seeks to enforce the terms of a collective bargaining agreement is usually found to be engaged in concerted activity.

On the other hand, an employee who acts as a "whistleblower" may or may not be engaging in concerted activity; if the complaint is entirely individual and the employee has not discussed it with co-workers, it is unlikely to be protected by the National Labor Relations Act (though it may well be protected under some other public policy).

== Political activity ==
A National Labor Relations Board decision from February 2024 protected an employee's right to wear a Black Lives Matter pin while on the job. In this case, the Board ruled it was unlawful for the employer to require the employee to remove the pin as a condition of their continued employment and determined that individuals supporting a group protest that is related to working conditions is protected.

Employees supporting political or social rights during work hours is not inherently protected concerted activity. Typically the political activity must be a "logical outgrowth" of group concerns related to employment conditions.

In this case, the employee's refusal to remove the Black Lives Matter pin was related to prior concerns about racial discrimination in their workplace. Wearing the pin was an employee action to bring group concerns to the attention of the employer and so it was protected concerted activity.

== Social media ==
The General Counsel of the National Labor Relations Board has often taken the position that employee conversations about common workplace issues which make use of social media such as Facebook and Twitter are protected against retaliation.

The Act does not limit the manner, time, or place in which employees can engage in concerted activity. Consequently, in recent years, the General Counsel of the National Labor Relations Board has often taken the position that employee conversations about common workplace issues which make use of social media such as Facebook and Twitter are protected against retaliation.

== See also ==
- National Labor Relations Act of 1935
- NLRB v. Washington Aluminum Co.
