= United States v. Wise =

- Supreme Court of the United States

Argued April 16, 1962 Decided June 25, 1962
- Full case name: United States v. Wise
- Citations: 370 U.S. 405 (more) 82 S. Ct. 1354; 8 L. Ed. 2d 590; 1962 U.S. LEXIS 2291

Holding
- Corporate officers acting in their capacities are subject to sanctions under the Sherman Antitrust Act.

Court membership
- Chief Justice Earl Warren Associate Justices Hugo Black · Felix Frankfurter; William O. Douglas · Tom C. Clark; John M. Harlan II · William J. Brennan Jr. Potter Stewart · Byron White

Case opinions
- Majority: Warren
- Concurrence: Harlan
- Frankfurter took no part in the consideration or decision of the case.

United States v. Wise, 370 U.S. 405 (1962), was a case in which the Supreme Court of the United States held that corporate officers acting in their duties could be subject to sanctions under the Sherman Antitrust Act.
