= Marital life estate =

Common law tradition in the US and UK

A marital life estate is, in the common law tradition of the United States and Great Britain, a life estate held by a living spouse (husband or wife) or widowed spouse, for the duration of that spouse's life.

== Creation ==
The marital life estate may be created by operation of law, agreement, contract, will, deed, or court order, such as a divorce decree or judgment.

== See also ==
- Life interest
- Tenancy by the entirety
- Community property
