= Kent v. Dulles =

- Supreme Court of the United States

Argued April 10, 1958 Decided June 16, 1958
- Full case name: Kent, et al. v. John Foster Dulles, Secretary of State
- Citations: 357 U.S. 116 (more) 78 S. Ct. 1113; 2 L. Ed. 2d 1204; 1958 U.S. LEXIS 814

Case history
- Prior: 248 F.2d 600 (D.C. Cir. 1957); cert. granted, 355 U.S. 881 (1957)

Holding
- The right to travel is a part of the "liberty" of which the citizen cannot be deprived without due process of law under the Fifth Amendment.

Court membership
- Chief Justice Earl Warren Associate Justices Hugo Black · Felix Frankfurter; William O. Douglas · Harold H. Burton; Tom C. Clark · John M. Harlan II; William J. Brennan Jr. · Charles E. Whittaker

Case opinions
- Majority: Douglas, joined by Warren, Black, Frankfurter, Brennan
- Dissent: Clark, joined by Burton, Harlan, Whittaker

Laws applied
- U.S. Const. amend. V

Kent v. Dulles, 357 U.S. 116 (1958), is a landmark decision of the U.S. Supreme Court in which the court held that the government violated the right to travel and First Amendment free speech rights when it suspended people's passports based on their political speech. It was the first case in which the U.S. Supreme Court made a distinction between the constitutionally protected substantive due process freedom of movement and the right to travel abroad (subsequently characterized as "right to international travel").

== Background ==
From 1950 to 1955, Rockwell Kent repeatedly applied for passports in order to travel to Europe for pleasure, in order to paint, and to attend peace conferences. He was denied a passport because he was allegedly a communist and was alleged to have "a consistent and prolonged adherence to the Communist Party line". He was told that he would not be issued a passport unless he submitted a non-communist affidavit, which he refused to do although he publicly disavowed party membership. Once he had exhausted his administrative appeals, his case became ripe for a constitutional challenge. Kent, represented by Leonard Boudin of the Emergency Civil Liberties Union, sued in U.S. District Court for declaratory relief. The District Court granted summary judgment against him.

On appeal, Kent's case was heard with that of Dr. Walter Briehl, a psychiatrist. When Briehl applied for a passport, the Director of the Passport Office asked him to supply an affidavit with respect to his membership in the Communist Party. Briehl, like Kent, refused. His application for a passport was tentatively disapproved. Briehl filed his complaint in the District Court, which held that his case was indistinguishable from Kent's and dismissed it.

The U.S. Court of Appeals for the District of Columbia Circuit heard the two cases en banc and affirmed the District Court by a divided vote.

== Decision of the Supreme Court ==
The cases were heard on writ of certiorari. The Court reversed the Court of Appeals. Kent v. Dulles was the first case in which the U.S. Supreme Court ruled that the right to travel is a part of the "liberty" of which the citizen cannot be deprived without due process of law under the Fifth Amendment. It did not decide the extent to which this liberty can be curtailed. The Court was first concerned with the extent, if any, to which Congress had authorized its curtailment by the U.S. Secretary of State. The Court found that the Secretary of State exceeded his authority by refusing to issue passports to Communists.

It did not rule on the constitutionality of the law because the only law which Congress had passed expressly curtailing the movement of Communists across U.S. borders had yet to take effect. Six years later, the Court in Aptheker v. Secretary of State found that the law violated First Amendment principles and left unsettled the extent to which this liberty to travel can be curtailed.

=== Majority opinion ===
In a majority opinion written by Justice William O. Douglas, the Court reviewed the history of the issuance and regulation of US passports, noting that the passport is "a document which, from its nature and object, is addressed to foreign powers; purporting only to be a request that the bearer of it may pass safely and freely, and is to be considered rather in the character of a political document by which the bearer is recognized in foreign countries as an American citizen" citing Urtetiqui v. D'Arbel, and that except in wartime "for most of our history, a passport was not a condition to entry or exit" concluding that the issuance of passports is "a discretionary act" on the part of the Secretary of State.

The Court then surveyed Angevin law under Magna Carta, citing Article 42 in support of the right to travel as a "liberty" right. It referenced Chafee in Three Human Rights in the Constitution of 1787. At that point the Court began to use the phrase "freedom of movement" as in "Freedom of movement is basic in our scheme of values", citing Crandall v. Nevada Williams v. Fears, Edwards v. California, and Vestal, Freedom of Movement, 41 Iowa L.Rev. 6, 13–14, although all the cases it cited involved interstate travel. The Court concluded that although "Freedom to travel is, indeed, an important aspect of the citizen's liberty" it need not decide the extent to which it can be curtailed because it was first concerned with the extent, if any, to which Congress had authorized its curtailment.

It reviewed prior administrative practice, noting that the power of the Secretary of State over the issuance of passports is expressed in broad terms, but long exercised quite narrowly. Historically, the cases of refusal of passports generally fell into two categories. First was the question pertinent to the citizenship of the applicant and his allegiance to the United States. Second was the question whether the applicant was participating in illegal conduct, trying to escape the toils of the law, promoting passport frauds, or otherwise engaging in conduct which would violate the laws of the United States. It considered wartime measures, citing Korematsu v. United States, for the proposition that the government could exclude citizens from their homes and restrict their freedom of movement only on a showing of "the gravest imminent danger to the public safety". It found that although there were scattered rulings of the State Department concerning Communists, they were not consistently of one pattern.

The Court concluded that although the issuance of a passport carries some implication of intention to extend the bearer diplomatic protection, its crucial function is control over exit and that the right of exit is a personal right included within the word "liberty" as used in the Fifth Amendment. It found that when that power is delegated, the standards must be adequate to pass scrutiny by the accepted tests, citing Panama Refining Co. v. Ryan, Cantwell v. Connecticut, and Niemotko v. Maryland, and that where activities or enjoyment natural and often necessary to the wellbeing of an American citizen, such as travel, are involved, the Court will construe narrowly all delegated powers that curtail or dilute them. Consequently, it found that § 1185 and § 211a did not delegate to the Secretary the kind of authority exercised in this case.

=== Dissent ===
The minority opinion was written by Justice Tom Clark with Justices Burton, Harlan and Whitaker concurring. The minority argued that historically Congress meant the Secretary to deny passports to those whose travel abroad would be contrary to American national security both in wartime and during peace, pointing out that passport restrictions on Communists were first implemented shortly after the 1917 Russian Revolution and continued periodically until 1952.

It felt an even more serious error of the majority was its determination that the Secretary's wartime use of his discretion was wholly irrelevant in determining what discretionary practices were approved by Congress in enactment of § 215. It was not a case of judging what may be done in peace by what has been done in war. Were it a time of peace, there might very well have been no problem for the Court to decide, since petitioners then would not need a passport to leave the country. The wartime practice may be the only relevant one, for the discretion with which the Court was concerned was discretionary control over international travel. Only in times of war and national emergency has a passport been required to leave or enter the country, and hence only in such times has passport power necessarily meant power to control travel.

It faulted the majority's assertion that the passport denials here were beyond the pale of congressional authorization because they do not involve grounds either of allegiance or criminal activity. It argued that neither of the propositions set out by the majority — (1) that the Secretary's denial of passports in peacetime extended to only two categories of cases, those involving allegiance and those involving criminal activity, and (2) that the Secretary's wartime exercise of his discretion, while admittedly more restrictive, had no relevance to the practice which Congress could have been said to have approved in 1952 — had any validity: the first was contrary to fact, and the second to common sense.

On this multiple basis, then, Judge Clark was constrained to disagree with the majority as to the authority of the Secretary to deny petitioners' applications for passports and would affirm on the issue of the Secretary's authority to require the affidavits involved in this case. He did not reach any constitutional questions, delegating to the majority's resolution of the authority question, the inability to rule on the constitutional issues raised by petitioners relating to claimed unlawful delegation of legislative power, violation of free speech and association under the First Amendment, and violation of international travel under the Fifth Amendment.

== See also ==
- Eunique v. Powell: 9th Circuit Court of Appeals case involving withholding passports based on overdue child support
- Zemel v. Rusk
