= Zemel v. Rusk =

- Supreme Court of the United States

Argued March 1, 1965 Decided May 3, 1965
- Full case name: Louis Zemel v. Dean Rusk, Secretary of State, et al.
- Citations: 381 U.S. 1 (more) 85 S. Ct. 1271; 14 L. Ed. 2d 179; 1965 U.S. LEXIS 1304; 1 Media L. Rep. 2299

Holding
- The Secretary of State has the power to refuse to validate passports for travel to Cuba.

Court membership
- Chief Justice Earl Warren Associate Justices Hugo Black · William O. Douglas; Tom C. Clark · John M. Harlan II; William J. Brennan Jr. · Potter Stewart; Byron White · Arthur Goldberg

Case opinions
- Majority: Warren, joined by Clark, Harlan, Brennan, Stewart, White
- Dissent: Black
- Dissent: Douglas, joined by Goldberg
- Dissent: Goldberg

Laws applied
- 22 U.S.C. § 211

Zemel v. Rusk, 381 U.S. 1 (1965), was a United States Supreme Court case regarding the right to travel and area restrictions on passports (travel to Cuba), holding that the Secretary of State is statutorily authorized to refuse to validate the passports of United States citizens for travel to Cuba and that the grant of that authority is constitutionally permissible because "Congress—in giving the Executive authority over matters of foreign affairs—must of necessity paint with a brush broader than that it customarily wields in domestic areas".

== Background ==
Prior to 1961, no passport was required for travel anywhere in the Western Hemisphere. On January 3 of that year, the United States broke diplomatic and consular relations with Cuba. On January 16, the Department of State eliminated Cuba from the area for which passports were not required, and declared all outstanding United States passports (except those held by persons already in Cuba) to be invalid for travel to or in Cuba "unless specifically endorsed for such travel under the authority of the Secretary of State." A companion press release stated that the Department contemplated granting exceptions to "persons whose travel may be regarded as being in the best interests of the United States, such as newsmen or businessmen with previously established business interests."

Through an exchange of letters in early 1962, Louis Zemel, a citizen of the United States and holder of an otherwise valid passport, applied to the State Department to have his passport validated for travel to Cuba as a tourist. His request was denied. On October 30, 1962, he renewed the request, stating that the purpose of the proposed trip was "to satisfy my curiosity about the state of affairs in Cuba and to make me a better informed citizen." The request again was denied on the ground that the purpose of the trip did not meet the previously prescribed standards for such travel.

On December 7, 1962, Zemel instituted this suit against the Secretary of State and the Attorney General in the United States District Court for the District of Connecticut, seeking a judgment declaring (1) that he was entitled under the Constitution and laws of the United States to travel to Cuba and to have his passport validated for that purpose; (2) that his travel to Cuba and the use of his passport for that purpose would not violate any statute, regulation, or passport restriction; (3) that the Secretary's restrictions upon travel to Cuba were invalid; (4) that the Passport Act of 1926 and § 215 of the Immigration and Nationality Act of 1952 were unconstitutional; (5) that the Secretary's refusal to grant him a passport valid for Cuba violated rights guaranteed him by the Constitution and the United Nations Declaration of Human Rights, and (6) that denial of the passport endorsement without a formal hearing violated his rights under the Fifth Amendment. (This procedural claim was abandoned in the District Court and not raised on appeal.) The complaint also requested that the Secretary be directed to validate appellant's passport for travel to Cuba, and that the Secretary and the Attorney General be enjoined from interfering with such travel. In his amended complaint, Zemel added to his constitutional attack on the 1926 and 1952 Acts a prayer that the Secretary and the Attorney General be enjoined from enforcing them.

On Zemel's motion and over the objection of appellees, a three-judge court was convened. On cross-motions for summary judgment, the court, by a divided vote, granted the Secretary of State's motion for summary judgment and dismissed the action against the Attorney General, 228 F.Supp. 65 (D.C.D.Conn., 1964). The case was heard on direct appeal from the district court pursuant to 28 U.S.C. § 1253 (1958 ed).

== Decision ==
The Court in a divided opinion held that the Secretary of State is statutorily authorized to refuse to validate the passports of United States citizens for travel to Cuba and that the exercise of that authority is constitutionally permissible.

== Majority opinion ==
Chief Justice Earl Warren, writing for the majority, held that the three-judge trial court was properly convened and that the Court therefore had jurisdiction over the appeal, citing Idlewild Liquor Corp. v. Epstein, 370 U.S. 713.

The Secretary of State's refusal to validate appellant's passport for travel to Cuba was supported by the authority granted by Congress in the Passport Act of 1926 because its language was broad enough to authorize area restrictions, and there was no legislative history indicating an intent to exclude such restrictions from the grant of authority. Further, during the decade preceding the passage of the Act, the Executive had imposed both peacetime and wartime area restrictions.

It distinguished from Kent v. Dulles because here it found an administrative practice sufficiently substantial and consistent to warrant the conclusion that Congress had implicitly approved it. The Court rejected Zemel's contention that the cases of refusal of passports generally fell into only two categories: 1) questions pertinent to the citizenship of the applicant and his allegiance to the United States and 2) the question whether the applicant was participating in illegal conduct, trying to escape the toils of the law, promoting passport frauds, or otherwise engaging in conduct which would violate the laws of the United States, noting that the issue involved in Kent was whether a citizen could be denied a passport because of his political beliefs or associations but that here the Secretary refused to validate appellant's passport not because of any characteristic peculiar to appellant, but rather because of foreign policy considerations affecting all citizens.

Regarding his Fifth Amendment due process right to travel claim and his First Amendment right to freedom of expression and association, the Court held that the requirements of due process were a function not only of the extent of the governmental restriction imposed, but also of the extent of the necessity for the restriction, citing Kent v. Dulles, Aptheker v. Secretary of State, Universal Declaration of Human Rights, Art. 13 (quoted. S.Doc. No. 123, 81st Cong., 1st Sess., p. 1157); and Korematsu v. United States, 323 U.S. 214 and that this case was supported by the weightiest considerations of national security. Zemel's assertion that the Secretary's refusal to validate his passport for travel to Cuba denied him rights guaranteed by the First Amendment was different from that which was raised in Kent v. Dulles and Aptheker v. Secretary of State because the refusal to validate his passport did not result from any expression or association on his part; he was not being forced to choose between membership in an organization and freedom to travel.

Although Zemel's contention that a First Amendment right was involved in the Secretary's refusal to validate passports for Cuba because it acted as an inhibition to the free the flow of information concerning that country, it was rather a factor to be considered in determining whether appellant was denied due process of law, under the Fifth Amendment citing again Kent v. Dulles and Aptheker v. Secretary of State. It was an inhibition of action and that the right to speak and publish does not carry with it the unrestrained right to gather information.

The Court also rejected Zemel's challenge that the 1926 Act did not contain sufficiently definite standards for the formulation of travel controls by the Executive. Executive authority over matters of foreign affairs must of necessity be painted with a brush broader than that customarily wielded in domestic areas because of the changeable and explosive nature of contemporary international relations, and the fact that the Executive is immediately privy to information which cannot be swiftly presented to, evaluated by, and acted upon by the legislature, citing United States v. Curtiss-Wright Corp., 299 U.S. 304. The passport refusals and restrictions adopted here could fairly be argued were adopted by Congress in light of prior administrative practice and thus did not constitute an invalid delegation, citing Kent v. Dulles.

Finally, the Court refused to enter an order enjoining the Secretary and the Attorney General from interfering with such travel. It found the lower court had been correct in refusing to reach the issue of criminal liability for unauthorized travel to Cuba because it was not clear if or how Zemel planned to travel to Cuba and whether criminal charges would be instituted against him if he did.

== Dissent ==
Justice Hugo Black, dissenting, refused to accept the Government's argument that the President had "inherent" power to make regulations governing the issuance and use of passports, citing Youngstown Sheet & Tube Co. v. Sawyer, 343 U.S. 579. He rejected the Government's contention that the passport regulations here involved were valid, because the discretion delegated to the President and Secretary of State were unbridled, amounting to "delegation running riot," citing Justice Cardozo in A. L. A. Schechter Poultry Corp. v. United States, 295 U.S. 495. In Justice Black's view, the 1926 Act gave the lawmaking power of Congress to the Secretary and the President, and that it therefore violated the constitutional command that "all" legislative power be vested in the Congress.

Justice William O. Douglas, with whom Justice Goldberg concurred, dissenting, arguing for strict scrutiny, invoked the peripheral rights of the citizen under the First Amendment, citing Kent v. Dulles, 357 U.S. 116, Cantwell v. Connecticut, 310 U.S. 296 and Aptheker v. Secretary of State, 378 U.S. 500 and NAACP v. Alabama, 377 U.S. 288. Restrictions on the right to travel in times of peace should be so particularized that a First Amendment right is not precluded unless some clear countervailing national interest stands in the way of its assertion.

Justice Goldberg, in a lengthy dissent, agreed with the Court that Congress had the constitutional power to impose area restrictions on travel, consistent with constitutional guarantees, but rejected the Court's holding that Congress had exercised this power. Moreover, he did not believe that the Executive has inherent authority to impose area restrictions in time of peace.

Justice Goldberg held that neither the legislative history nor administrative practice supported the Court's view that when Congress reenacted the 1856 provision in 1926, it intended to grant the Executive authority to impose area restrictions and that the only area restrictions imposed between 1856 and 1926 arose out of the First World War. In 1926 Congress reenacted, in virtually identical terms, the 1856 statute, the sole purpose of which was to centralize passport issuance in the hands of the Secretary of State in order to overcome the abuses and chaos caused by the fact that, prior to the passage of the statute, numerous unauthorized persons issued passports and travel documents.

He noted that more numerous instances of restriction on travel because of political beliefs and associations in wartime were insufficient to show that Congress intended to grant the Secretary authority to curtail such travel in peacetime, holding that Kent v. Dulles should be controlling here. Justice Goldberg felt that the statute was simply inapplicable to area restrictions because it could not be presumed that Congress, without focusing upon the complex problems involved, resolved them by adopting a broad and sweeping statute which, in the Court's view, conferred unlimited discretion upon the Executive, and which made no distinctions reconciling the rights of the citizen to travel with the government's legitimate needs.

== See also ==
- List of United States Supreme Court cases, volume 381
- Regan v. Wald
