= Aptheker v. Secretary of State =

- Supreme Court of the United States

Argued April 21, 1964 Decided June 22, 1964
- Full case name: Aptheker, et al. v. Secretary of State
- Citations: 378 U.S. 500 (more) 84 S. Ct. 1659; 12 L. Ed. 2d 992; 1964 U.S. LEXIS 2225

Holding
- Section 6 of the Subversive Activities Control Act of 1950 is an unconstitutional abridgment of a person's freedom of movement and is impermissibly broad.

Court membership
- Chief Justice Earl Warren Associate Justices Hugo Black · William O. Douglas; Tom C. Clark · John M. Harlan II; William J. Brennan Jr. · Potter Stewart; Byron White · Arthur Goldberg

Case opinions
- Majority: Goldberg, joined by Warren, Douglas, Brennan, Stewart
- Concurrence: Black
- Concurrence: Douglas
- Dissent: Clark, joined by Harlan; White (part I)

Laws applied
- U.S. Const. amend. V

Aptheker v. Secretary of State, 378 U.S. 500 (1964), is a landmark decision of the US Supreme Court on the right to travel and passport restrictions as they relate to Fifth Amendment due process rights and First Amendment free speech, freedom of assembly and freedom of association rights. It is the first case in which the US Supreme Court considered the constitutionality of personal restrictions on the right to travel abroad.

In Aptheker, the petitioner challenged Section 6 of the Subversive Activities Control Act of 1950, which made it a crime for any member of a Communist organization to attempt to use or obtain a passport.

== Background ==
Appellants Herbert Aptheker and Elizabeth Gurley Flynn were native born citizens and residents of the United States and had held valid passports. Aptheker was editor of Political Affairs, the 'theoretical organ' of the Communist Party in the United States and appellant Flynn was chairman of the Party. On January 22, 1962, the Acting Director of the Passport Office notified appellants that their passports were revoked because the Department of State believed that their use of the passports would violate § 6 of the Subversive Activities Control Act of 1950 which provided that it was unlawful for any member of a Communist party to apply for or to renew a US passport or to use such a passport.

Appellants requested and received hearings to review the revocations of their passports. The examiners recommended that the passport revocations be sustained. Both appellants appealed to the Board of Passport Appeals which recommended affirmance of the revocations. The Secretary of State subsequently approved the recommendations of the Board.

Appellants thereupon filed separate complaints seeking declaratory and injunctive relief in the United States District Court for the District of Columbia. The complaints asked that judgments be entered declaring § 6 unconstitutional and ordering the Secretary of State to issue passports to appellants. Appellant-plaintiffs alleged that § 6 was unconstitutional as, inter alia, "a deprivation without due process of law of plaintiff's constitutional liberty to travel abroad, in violation of the Fifth Amendment to the Constitution of the United States."

The three-judge District Court rejected appellants' contentions, sustained the constitutionality of § 6 of the Control Act, and granted the Secretary's motion for summary judgment, concluding that the enactment by Congress of § 6 was a valid exercise of the power of Congress to protect and preserve the Government against the threat posed by the world Communist movement and that the regulatory scheme bore a reasonable relation thereto.

In the US Supreme Court, appellants attacked § 6, both on its face and as applied, as an unconstitutional deprivation of the liberty guaranteed in the Bill of Rights. The Government, while conceding that the right to travel is protected by the Fifth Amendment, contended that the Due Process Clause does not prevent the reasonable regulation of liberty and that § 6 was a reasonable regulation because of its relation to the danger the world Communist movement presented for national security. Alternatively, the Government argued that 'whether or not denial of passports to some members of the Communist Party might be deemed not reasonably related to national security, surely Section 6 was reasonable as applied to the top-ranking Party leaders involved here.

== Opinion of the Court ==
Justice Goldberg held, with Justices Black and Douglas concurring, that § 6 of the Control Act too broadly and indiscriminately restricted the right to travel and thereby abridged the liberty guaranteed by the Fifth Amendment and that § 6 of the Control Act was unconstitutional on its face. As to the government's alternative theory, the clarity and preciseness of the provision in question made it impossible to narrow its indiscriminately cast and overly broad scope without substantial judicial rewriting which was beyond the power of the Court in this case.

=== Majority ===
The Court began with Kent v. Dulles, reaffirming that the right to travel abroad was 'an important aspect of the citizen's 'liberty" guaranteed in the Due Process Clause of the Fifth Amendment. It then cited NAACP v. Alabama and NAACP v. Button in support of the "well-established principles by which to test whether the restrictions here imposed [were] consistent with the liberty guaranteed in the Fifth Amendment." It enumerated these principles by citing Shelton v. Tucker via NAACP v. Alabama "'(E)ven though the governmental purpose be legitimate and substantial, that purpose cannot be pursued by means that broadly stifle fundamental personal liberties when the end can be more narrowly achieved. The breadth of legislative abridgment must be viewed in the light of less drastic means for achieving the same basic purpose.'"

It then considered the congressional purpose underlying § 6 of the Control Act, noting that the legislation in question flowed from the congressional desire to protect national security which it held was obviously and unarguably within the Congress' Constitutional power. But it concluded that the legislation was indiscriminate due to an absence of criteria linking the bare fact of membership in a Communist organization to the individual's knowledge, activity or commitment. The provision swept within its prohibition both knowing and unknowing members, citing Wieman v. Updegraff: 'Indiscriminate classification of innocent with knowing activity must fall as an assertion of arbitrary power.' The irrebuttable presumption of Section 6 that individuals who are members of the specified organizations will, if given passports, engage in activities inimical to the security of the United States also rendered irrelevant the member's degree of activity in the organization and his commitment to its purpose, citing Schware v. Board of Bar Examiners.

The Court further noted that section 6 excluded other considerations which might more closely relate the denial of passports to the stated purpose of the legislation, such as the purposes for which an individual wishes to travel or the security-sensitivity of the areas in which he wishes to travel. In determining whether there has been an abridgment of the Fifth Amendment's guarantee of liberty, the Court recognized the danger of punishing a member of a Communist organization 'for his adherence to lawful and constitutionally protected purposes, because of other and unprotected purposes which he does not necessarily share, citing Noto v. United States. And it noted that Congress had within its power 'less drastic' means of achieving the congressional objective of safeguarding the nation's security.

The Court then considered the government's alternate theory, rejecting it because the law was clear and precise and could not be judicially rewritten to take in only top party members. The Court concluded that "since freedom of travel is a constitutional liberty closely related to rights of free speech and association, we believe that appellants in this case should not be required to assume the burden of demonstrating that Congress could not have written a statute constitutionally prohibiting their travel."

=== Concurrence ===
In a concurring opinion, Justice Black expressed his opinion that the whole act, including Section 6, was a bill of attainder. He held it appropriate "to point out that the Framers thought that the best way to promote the internal security of our people is to protect their First Amendment freedoms of speech, press, religion and assembly, and that we cannot take away the liberty of groups whose views most people detest without jeopardizing the liberty of all others whose views, though popular today, may themselves be detested tomorrow."

Justice Douglas, also concurring, opined that "Freedom of movement is kin to the right of assembly and to the right of association. These rights may not be abridged," citing De Jonge v. Oregon. "War may be the occasion for serious curtailment of liberty. Absent war, I see no way to keep a citizen from traveling within or without the country, unless there is power to detain him. Ex parte Endo, 323 U.S. 283, 65 S.Ct. 208, 89 L.Ed. 243. And no authority to detain exists except under extreme conditions, e.g., unless he has been convicted of a crime or unless there is probable cause for issuing a warrant of arrest by standards of the Fourth Amendment." "We cannot exercise and enjoy citizenship in world perspective without the right to travel abroad; and I see no constitutional way to curb it unless, as I said, there is the power to detain."

=== Dissent ===
Justice Clark wrote the minority opinion which was joined by Justices Harlan and White. The minority objected to the refusal of the majority to consider the government's alternate theory, citing United States v. Raines, 362 U.S. 17, distinguishing the Court's thinking in First Amendment cases in Thornhill and Button and Fifth Amendment cases in Kent. The minority would hold that as applied to the prosecution of the Communist Party's top dignitaries, the section was clearly constitutional, noting that Aptheker and Flynn fail the majority's criteria for "indiscriminate" because each clearly knew of their party membership and each was committed to its causes. Neither desired to travel to some innocent destination. Consequently, the Court should not reject the law on the hypothetical but should rather hold the law constitutional as applied.

He would also find the section valid on its face, holding that the remedy adopted by the Congress had a rational basis because it was reasonably related to national security and reasonably tailored to accomplish the purpose. He rejected the "loose generalization" that individual guilt might be conclusively presumed from membership in the Party" because the matter could not be held in isolation but need be considered relative to the subject matter involved and legislative findings.

Justice White, without elaboration, would hold Section 6 constitutional as applied but did not join Justice Clark in his facial analysis.

== See also ==
- Kent v. Dulles
