= Norris–LaGuardia Act =

U.S. federal labor law

- Other short titles: Anti-Injunction Bill
- Long title: An Act to amend the Judicial Code and to define and limit the jurisdiction of courts sitting in equity, and for other purposes
- Nicknames: Act of March 23, 1932
- Enacted by: the 72nd United States Congress

Citations
- Statutes at Large: 47 Stat. 70

Codification
- Titles amended: Title 29 of the United States Code
- U.S.C. sections created: 29 U.S.C. § 101 et seq.

Legislative history
- Introduced in the Senate by George W. Norris (R–NE); Fiorello H. La Guardia (R–NY); Passed the Senate on (75–5); Passed the House on (363–13); Signed into law by President Herbert Hoover on March 23, 1932

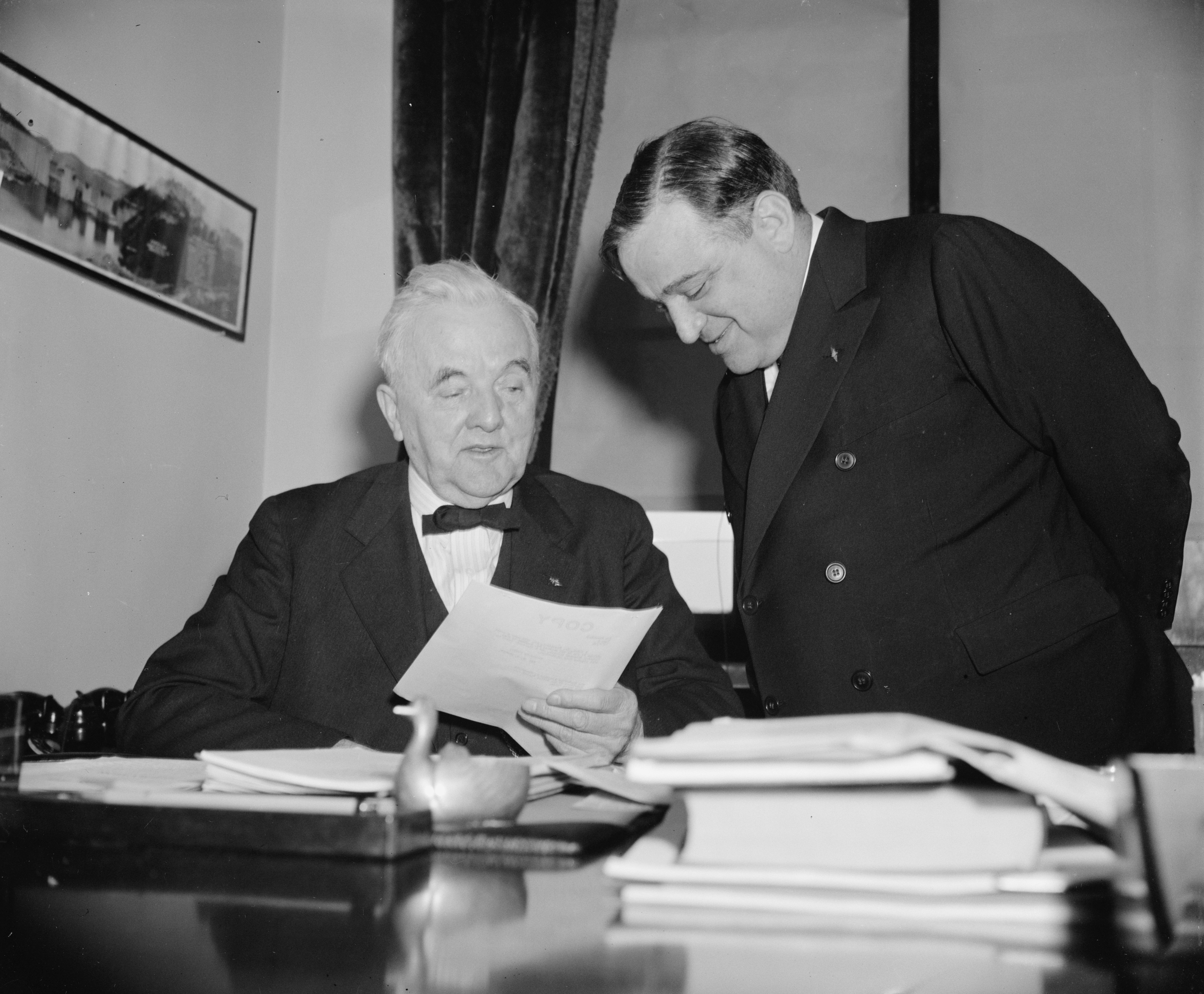
Senator George W. Norris of Nebraska (left) and Representative Fiorello H. La Guardia of New York, both Republicans, were the chief sponsors of the Act

The Norris–LaGuardia Act (also known as the Anti-Injunction Bill) is a 1932 United States federal law relating to United States labor law. It banned yellow-dog contracts, barred the federal courts from issuing injunctions against nonviolent labor disputes, and created a positive right of noninterference by employers against workers joining trade unions. It is considered a victory for the organized labor movement.

The common title comes from the names of the sponsors of the legislation: Senator George W. Norris of Nebraska and Representative Fiorello H. La Guardia of New York, both Republicans.

== History ==
The Supreme Court held in Coppage v. Kansas (1915) that yellow-dog contracts were enforceable. In the aftermath of that case, the number of judicial injunctions against labor increased substantially, and organizing a union without the employer's consent became extremely difficult.

The law is formally the Act of March 23, 1932 (Ch. 90, 47 Stat. 70). It is currently codified at 29 U.S.C. ch. 6, starting at 29 U.S.C. § 101 et. seq.

== Overview ==
The Act states that yellow-dog contracts, where workers agree as a condition of employment not to join a labor union, are unenforceable in federal court. It also establishes that employees are free to form unions without employer interference and prevents the federal courts from issuing injunctions in nonviolent labor disputes. The three provisions include protecting worker's self-organization and liberty or "collective bargaining", removing jurisdiction from federal courts vis-a-vis the issuance of injunctions in non-violent labor disputes, and outlawing the "yellow-dog" contract.

Section 13A of the act was fully applied by the Supreme Court of the United States with a 1938 decision, New Negro Alliance v. Sanitary Grocery Co., in an opinion authored by Justice Owen Roberts. The Court held that the act meant to prohibit employers from proscribing the peaceful dissemination of information concerning the terms and conditions of employment by those involved in an active labor dispute, even when such dissemination occurs on an employer's private property.

== In popular culture ==
The Living Theater play Injunction Granted features a scene in which a judge grants injunctions against many trade unions. There follows a scene in which the Norris–LaGuardia Act is passed.

== See also ==
- United States labor law
