= List of United States Supreme Court cases by the Fuller Court =

Supreme Court of the United States
Fuller Court
- Waite Court ← → White Court
- October 10, 1888 – July 4, 1910 (21 years, 267 days)
- Seat: Old Senate Chamber; Washington, D.C.
- No. of positions: 9
- Fuller Court decisions

This is a partial chronological list of cases decided by the United States Supreme Court during the Fuller Court, the tenure of Chief Justice Melville Weston Fuller from October 8, 1888, through July 4, 1910.

Case name	Citation	Summary
Kidd v. Pearson	128 U.S. 1 (1888)	Scope of the Commerce Clause
Dent v. West Virginia	129 U.S. 114 (1889)	state licensing of doctors
Botiller v. Dominguez	130 U.S. 238 (1889)	validity of Spanish and Mexican land grants within the Mexican Cession
Chicago, Burlington & Quincy Railroad Co. v. City of Chicago	130 U.S. 581 (1889)	
Smith v. Bolles	132 U.S. 125 (1889)	
Davis v. Beason	133 U.S. 333 (1890)	United States federal courts have jurisdiction to hear charges related to polygamy even though it be part of a religious belief
Hans v. Louisiana	134 U.S. 1 (1890)	sovereign immunity of states, interpreting the Eleventh Amendment
Chicago, Milwaukee & St. Paul Railroad v. Minnesota	134 U.S. 418 (1890)	states and railway fees
In re Neagle	135 U.S. 1 (1890)	authority of the U.S. Attorney General to appoint U.S. Marshals as bodyguards to Supreme Court Justices
LDS Church v. United States	136 U.S. 1 (1890)	upheld revocation of LDS Church charter and confiscation of church property
Jones v. United States (1890)	137 U.S. 202 (1890)	upheld the Guano Islands Act
In re Ross	140 U.S. 453 (1891)	application of U.S. law to foreign sailors on U.S. flagged ships while in another country
Union Pacific Railway Co. v. Botsford	141 U.S. 250 (1891)	right to Bodily integrity
Marshall v. Holmes	141 U.S. 589 (1891)	unconscionability as grounds for equitable relief where fraud on the court is alleged
Counselman v. Hitchcock	142 U.S. 547 (1892)	
Holy Trinity Church v. United States	143 U.S. 457 (1892)	contracts with foreign citizens, religion
United States v. Ballin	144 U.S. 1 (1892)	
Lau Ow Bew v. United States	144 U.S. 47 (1892)	
Mutual Life Insurance Co. of New York v. Hillmon	145 U.S. 285 (1892)	
Illinois Central Railroad v. Illinois	146 U.S. 387 (1892)	railroad land dispute, public trust doctrine
Kohn v. McNulta	147 U.S. 238 (1893)	
Fleitas v. Richardson	147 U.S. 550 (1893)	
Virginia v. Tennessee	148 U.S. 503 (1893)	
Nix v. Hedden	149 U.S. 304 (1893)	status of the tomato as fruit or vegetable under Tariff Act of 1883
Fong Yue Ting v. United States	149 U.S. 698 (1893)	
Wharton v. Wise	153 U.S. 155 (1894)	
McKane v. Durston	153 U.S. 684 (1894)	
Schillinger v. United States	155 U.S. 163 (1894)	sovereign immunity forbids suit against the Federal government for patent infringement
United States v. E. C. Knight Co.	156 U.S. 1 (1895)	antitrust action; “Sugar Trust Case”
Sparf v. United States	156 U.S. 51 (1895)	jury instructions
Coffin v. United States	156 U.S. 432 (1895)	the presumption of innocence
In re Debs	158 U.S. 564 (1895)	strikes and interstate commerce
Pollock v. Farmers' Loan & Trust Co.	158 U.S. 601 (1895)	income tax and tariffs
Hilton v. Guyot	159 U.S. 113 (1895)	doctrine of comity
United States v. Gettysburg Electric Railway Co.	160 U.S. 668 (1896)	
Rosen v. United States	161 U.S. 29 (1896)	defendant's ability to inspect evidence at obscenity trial overcame objection that indictment was too vague
Geer v. Connecticut	161 U.S. 519 (1896)	states owned the wild animals within their borders and can strictly regulate their management and harvest
Schlemmer v. Buffalo, Rochester & Pittsburgh Railway Co.	162 U.S. 283 (1896)	
Graver v. Faurot	162 U.S. 435 (1896)	Judiciary Act of 1891 bars Court from considering entire case without questions that can be separately resolved; cert denied and question of resolving two earlier cases reverts to Seventh Circuit
Talton v. Mayes	163 U.S. 376 (1896)	individual rights in U.S. Constitution not applicable to tribal governments
Ward v. Race Horse	163 U.S. 504 (1896)	
Plessy v. Ferguson	163 U.S. 537 (1896)	segregation; "separate but equal"
United States v. Ball	163 U.S. 662 (1896)	double jeopardy
Allen v. United States (1896)	164 U.S. 492 (1896)	
Allgeyer v. Louisiana	165 U.S. 578 (1897)	Freedom of contract
Chicago, Burlington & Quincy Railroad Co. v. City of Chicago	166 U.S. 226 (1897)	
United States v. Trans-Missouri Freight Association	166 U.S. 290 (1897)	railroads and rate fixing
Davis v. Massachusetts	167 U.S. 43 (1897)	
Interstate Commerce Commission v. Cincinnati, New Orleans and Texas Pacific Railway Co.	167 U.S. 479 (1897)	powers of an administrative agency
Barrett v. United States	169 U.S. 218 (1898)	South Carolina had not been subdivided into separate federal judicial districts
Holden v. Hardy	169 U.S. 366 (1898)	working hours of miners
United States v. Wong Kim Ark	169 U.S. 649 (1898)	citizenship and race
Hawker v. New York	170 U.S. 189 (1898)	character and doctor's licenses
Williams v. Mississippi	170 U.S. 213 (1898)	literacy tests
Smyth v. Ames	171 U.S. 361 (1898)	
City of Walla Walla v. Walla Walla Water Co.	172 U.S. 1 (1898)	
Andersen v. Treat	172 U.S. 24 (1898)	
United States v. Johnson (1899)	173 U.S. 363 (1899)	
Morris v. United States	174 U.S. 196 (1899)	
Brown v. New Jersey	175 U.S. 172 (1899)	use of a struck jury
Addyston Pipe & Steel Co. v. United States	175 U.S. 211 (1899)	
Malony v. Adsit	175 U.S. 281 (1899)	trial judge must authenticate bill of exceptions
Cumming v. Richmond County Board of Education	175 U.S. 528 (1899)	segregation in public schools
The Paquete Habana	175 U.S. 677 (1900)	prize in admiralty law and customary international law
Maxwell v. Dow	176 U.S. 581 (1900)	Utah court procedure
Bad Elk v. United States	177 U.S. 529 (1900)	unlawful arrest
Taylor v. Beckham	178 U.S. 548 (1900)	Kentucky gubernatorial election of 1899
Austin v. Tennessee	179 U.S. 343 (1900)	restricting or prohibiting the sale of tobacco
Marks v. Shoup	181 U.S. 562 (1901)	Property issues
Insular Cases
DeLima v. Bidwell	182 U.S. 1 (1901)	constitutional status of Puerto Rico and the Philippines
Goetze v. United States	182 U.S. 221 (1901)	constitutional status of Puerto Rico and the Philippines
Armstrong v. United States	182 U.S. 243 (1901)	constitutional status of Puerto Rico and the Philippines
Downes v. Bidwell	182 U.S. 244 (1901)	constitutional status of Puerto Rico and the Philippines
Huus v. New York & Porto Rico S.S. Co.	182 U.S. 392 (1901)	constitutional status of Puerto Rico and the Philippines
Dooley v. United States	183 U.S. 151 (1901)	constitutional status of Puerto Rico and the Philippines
Fourteen Diamond Rings v. United States	183 U.S. 176 (1901)	constitutional status of Puerto Rico and the Philippines
Montoya v. United States	180 U.S. 261 (1901)	legal definition of Native American tribes
Compagnie Francaise de Navigation a Vapeur v. Louisiana Board of Health	186 U.S. 380 (1902)	Constitutionality of state quarantine laws
Lone Wolf v. Hitchcock	187 U.S. 553 (1903)	power of Congress to abrogate treaties with Native American tribes
Bleistein v. Donaldson Lithographing Co.	188 U.S. 239 (1903)	copyright protection of illustrations made for advertisements
Champion v. Ames	188 U.S. 321 (1903)	Congressional Commerce Clause regulation of lottery tickets
Yamataya v. Fisher	189 U.S. 86 (1903)	
Giles v. Harris	189 U.S. 475 (1903)	voting rights, Eleventh Amendment
Hawaii v. Manikichi	190 U.S. 197 (1903)	sometimes considered one of the Insular Cases
Ex parte Joins	191 U.S. 93 (1903)	
Missouri, Kansas, & Texas Railway Co. of Texas v. May	194 U.S. 267 (1904)	14th Amendment permits law which penalizes railroads for allowing weeds to grow
Kepner v. United States	195 U.S. 100 (1904)	sometimes considered one of the Insular Cases
Dorr v. United States	195 U.S. 138 (1904)	sometimes considered one of the Insular Cases
Gonzales v. Williams	192 U.S. 1 (1904)	Puerto Ricans and illegal aliens
Northern Securities Co. v. United States	193 U.S. 197 (1904)	Antitrust, application of the Sherman Antitrust Act
Johnson v. Southern Pacific Co.	196 U.S. 1 (1904)	
Burton v. United States (1905)’’	196 U.S. 283 (1905)	
Swift & Co. v. United States	196 U.S. 375 (1905)	Commerce Clause, to regulate monopolies
Jacobson v. Massachusetts	197 U.S. 11 (1905)	Police power supersedes freedom of religion in matters of public health; vaccination requirements are constitutional
Rasmussen v. United States	197 U.S. 516 (1905)	sometimes considered one of the Insular Cases
Lochner v. New York	198 U.S. 45 (1905)	freedom of contract, substantive due process
Harris v. Balk	198 U.S. 215 (1905)	quasi in rem jurisdiction
Chicago Board of Trade v. Christie Grain	198 U.S. 236 (1905)	upholding power of Chicago Board of Trade to regulate futures contracts
United States v. Ju Toy	198 U.S. 253 (1905)	
United States v. Winans	198 U.S. 371 (1905)	
Rogers v. Peck	199 U.S. 425 (1905)	
United States v. Detroit Timber & Lumber Co.	200 U.S. 321 (1906)	
Hale v. Henkel	201 U.S. 43 (1906)	witness testimony in antitrust cases
Burton v. United States (1906)’’	202 U.S. 344 (1906)	
Hodges v. United States	203 U.S. 1 (1906)	
Northwestern National Life Ins. Co. v. Riggs	203 U.S. 243 (1906)	upheld power of states to regulate insurance contracts against Fourteenth Amendment challenge
United States v. Shipp	203 U.S. 563 (1906)	Only criminal trial in the court's history. Lynching.
Seneca Nation of Indians v. Christy	205 U.S. 1 (1907)	
Tinsley v. Treat	205 U.S. 20 (1907)	
Kessler v. Treat	205 U.S. 33 (1907)	
Halter v. Nebraska	205 U.S. 34 (1907)	
Citizens' Savings & Trust Co. v. Illinois Central Railway Co.	205 U.S. 46 (1907)	
Wilmington Star Mining Co. v. Fulton	205 U.S. 60 (1907)	
United States ex rel. West v. Hitchcock	205 U.S. 80 (1907)	
Pearcy v. Stranahan	205 U.S. 257 (1907)	
Patterson v. Colorado	205 U.S. 454 (1907)	
Kessler v. Eldred	206 U.S. 285 (1907)	
Hunter v. City of Pittsburgh	207 U.S. 161 (1907)	
Winters v. United States	207 U.S. 564 (1908)	
Adair v. United States	208 U.S. 161 (1908)	"Yellow Dog contract"
Loewe v. Lawlor	208 U.S. 274 (1908)	Sherman Antitrust Act applied against labor union boycott
Muller v. Oregon	208 U.S. 412 (1908)	protective labor laws, protection of women
White-Smith Music Publishing Co. v. Apollo Co.	209 U.S. 1 (1908)	manufacturers of player pianos need not pay royalties to copyright holders of music
Ex parte Young	209 U.S. 123 (1908)	exception to sovereign immunity under the Eleventh Amendment
Ware & Leland v. Mobile County	209 U.S. 405 (1908)	contracts for the sales of cotton for future delivery that do not oblige interstate shipments are not subjects of interstate commerce, and are taxable by states
Bobbs-Merrill Co. v. Straus	210 U.S. 339 (1908)	First-sale doctrine, copyright holder cannot control resale prices by use of licenses
Londoner v. City and County of Denver	210 U.S. 373 (1908)	role of due process in administrative rulemaking
Continental Paper Bag Co. v. Eastern Paper Bag Co.	210 U.S. 405 (1908)	patent and antitrust
Berea College v. Kentucky	211 U.S. 45 (1908)	state laws and segregation of educational facilities
Twining v. New Jersey	211 U.S. 78 (1908)	Fifth Amendment does not apply to state trials
Louisville & Nashville Railroad Co. v. Mottley	211 U.S. 149 (1908)	federal question jurisdiction, the "well-pleaded complaint rule"
North American Cold Storage Co. v. City of Chicago	211 U.S. 306 (1908)	
Moyer v. Peabody	212 U.S. 78 (1909)	citizens' rights during insurrection
Welch v. Swasey	214 U.S. 91 (1909)	Massachusetts' statute restricting building heights is constitutional
Maryland v. West Virginia	217 U.S. 1 (1910)	
Weems v. United States	217 U.S. 349 (1910)	
