= Citizens' Savings & Trust Co. v. Illinois Central Railway Co. =

Citizens' Sav. & Trust Co. v. Illinois Central R. Co.
- Supreme Court of the United States

Argued December 3–4, 1906 Decided March 4, 1907
- Full case name: Citizens' Savings and Trust Company v. Illinois Central Railroad Company
- Citations: 205 U.S. 46 (more) 27 S. Ct. 425; 51 L. Ed. 703

Court membership
- Chief Justice Melville Fuller Associate Justices John M. Harlan · David J. Brewer; Edward D. White · Rufus W. Peckham; Joseph McKenna · Oliver W. Holmes Jr. William R. Day · William H. Moody

Case opinion
- Majority: Harlan, joined by unanimous

Citizens' Sav. & Trust Co. v. Illinois Central R. Co., 205 U.S. 46 (1907), was a suit brought in the United States District Court for the Eastern District of Illinois against the Illinois Central Railroad Company, the Belleville & Southern Illinois Railroad Company, the St. Louis, Alton & Terre Haute Railroad Company (205 U.S. 46, 47), all Illinois corporations (to be hereafter called, respectively, the Illinois, the Belleville, and Terre Haute companies), and the United States Trust Company, a New York corporation. The last named corporation was never served with process and did not appear in the suit. The case presents a question as to the jurisdiction of the court below.

== Arguments and rulings ==
The plaintiff, an Ohio corporation, was the holder of 400 shares of the common stock of the Belleville company, and sued on its own and on behalf of all other stockholders of that company.

The bill charged that certain deeds were illegally and fraudulently procured by the Illinois Central Railroad Company, and by means of those instruments, and by various improper schemes, it had acquired not only complete control over and possession of the Belleville company and all its properties, but managed those properties in its own interest and in total disregard of the rights of holders of the common stock of the Belleville company. It was charged that the Illinois Central Railroad Company had practically destroyed the value of such stock.

The plaintiff also asked for a decree ordering the defendant, the Illinois Central Railroad Company, to account for and pay over to the Belleville company, or to a receiver to be appointed for that company, such proportion of the yearly gross earnings as the Belleville company is entitled to under the lease executed by and between the Belleville company and the Terre Haute Railroad Company, bearing date October 1, 1866; such accounting to cover each fiscal year, or part thereof, from the time when the Illinois Central Railroad Company first acquired the railroad properties of the Belleville company as lessee or sublessee under the lease executed on or about the 1st of April, 1896, up to the time of such accounting; further, for 'an order appointing a receiver for the Belleville & Southern Illinois Railroad Company, with the usual powers of such receivers; and that the Illinois Central Railroad Company, through its officers and agents, be ordered to surrender and deliver to said receiver all the corporate assets (205 U.S. 46, 49), books, papers, and everything that rightfully belongs to the Belleville & Southern Illinois Railroad Company, and that the Illinois Central Railroad, Company be ordered to account to such receiver, as is hereinbefore prayed. That the defendant, the Illinois Central Railroad Company, its officers and agents, be restrained from further violating the rights of your orator, and be ordered, directed, and restrained in particular from interfering in any way with said receiver, or with the operation of said Belleville company as an independent and separate railroad company; and for such other and further relief as the equity of the case may require.'

The Belleville company pleaded under protest that the court below was without jurisdiction to proceed against it, in that the defendant was an inhabitant of the northern division of the northern district of Illinois, having its residence in that division and district at Chicago, where its corporate meetings were held and its corporate business transacted.

By its final order the court sustained the pleas to the jurisdiction, and dismissed the suit. (205 U.S. 46, 50) Messrs. Edward C. Eliot and William B. Sanders for appellant.

The plaintiff contends that this condition was waived, and the general appearance of the defendants entered, when their counsel, at the hearing as to the sufficiency of the pleas to the jurisdiction, argued the merits of the case as disclosed by the bill. This is too harsh an interpretation of what occurred in the court below. There was no motion for the dismissal of the bill for want of equity. The discussion of the merits was permitted or invited by the court in order that it might be informed on that question in the event it concluded to consider the merits along with the question of the sufficiency of the pleas to the jurisdiction. We are satisfied that the defendants did not intend to waive the benefit of their qualified appearance at the time of filing the pleas to the jurisdiction.

The high court found that the suit was of such a nature as to bring it within the jurisdiction of the circuit court for the eastern district, under the Jurisdiction and Removal Act of 1875. The judgment must was reversed and the cause remanded, that the plaintiff may proceed, as it may be advised, with the preparation of its case under the act of 1875

It was so ordered.

== See also ==
- List of United States Supreme Court cases, volume 205
