= Kessler v. Treat =

- Supreme Court of the United States

Argued December 3–4, 1906 Decided March 4, 1907
- Full case name: Kessler v. Treat
- Citations: 205 U.S. 33 (more) 27 S. Ct. 434; 51 L. Ed. 695

Court membership
- Chief Justice Melville Fuller Associate Justices John M. Harlan · David J. Brewer; Edward D. White · Rufus W. Peckham; Joseph McKenna · Oliver W. Holmes Jr. William R. Day · William H. Moody

Case opinions
- Majority: Fuller, joined by Brewer, White, Peckham, McKenna, Holmes, Day
- Dissent: Harlan
- Moody took no part in the consideration or decision of the case.

Kessler v. Treat, 205 U.S. 33 (1907), was a decision in which the Supreme Court of the United States adjudicated allegations that prisoners were unlawfully imprisoned by Morgan Treat, the United States Marshall for the Eastern District of Virginia. In a one-sentence opinion written by Chief Justice Melville Fuller, the Court identified ten cases for which the Court entered the same decree as the one issued in Tinsley v. Treat. Justice John Marshall Harlan dissented without writing a separate opinion.

== Cases for which decrees were entered ==
The Court entered decrees for the following cases:

- William De. C. Kessler v. Morgan Treat, United States Marshal, el al.
- Samuel T. Morgan v. Morgan Treat, etc.
- Austin B. Carpenter v. Morgan Treat, etc.
- Fortesque Whittle v. Morgan Treat, etc.
- Frank E. Wilcox v. Morgan Treat, etc.
- George Braden v. Morgan Treat, etc.
- Frank S. Royster v. Morgan Treat, etc.
- J. Rice Smith v. Morgan Treat, etc.
- Charles F. Burroughs v. Morgan Treat, etc.
- Charles H. McDowell v. Morgan Treat, etc.

== See also ==
- Andersen v. Treat (1898)
- List of United States Supreme Court cases, volume 205
