= Travers v. Reinhardt =

- Supreme Court of the United States

Decided April 15, 1907
- Full case name: Travers v. Reinhardt
- Citations: 205 U.S. 423 (more)

Holding
- Witnesses are not required to establish a common law marriage, because an agreement to be married may be inferred from the circumstances of the relationship.

Court membership
- Chief Justice Melville Fuller Associate Justices John M. Harlan · David J. Brewer; Edward D. White · Rufus W. Peckham; Joseph McKenna · Oliver W. Holmes Jr. William R. Day · William H. Moody

Case opinions
- Majority: Harlan
- Dissent: Holmes
- McKenna and Moody took no part in the consideration or decision of the case.

Travers v. Reinhardt, 205 U.S. 423 (1907), was a United States Supreme Court case in which the court held that witnesses are not required to establish a common law marriage, because an agreement to be married may be inferred from the circumstances of the relationship.
