= Pearcy v. Stranahan =

- Supreme Court of the United States

Argued March 4, 1907 Decided April 8, 1907
- Full case name: Edward J. Pearcy v. Nevada N. Stranahan
- Citations: 205 U.S. 257 (more) 27 S. Ct. 545; 51 L. Ed. 793; 1907 U.S. LEXIS 1393

Holding
- [A]s the United States have never taken possession of the Isle of Pines as having been ceded by the treaty of peace, and as it has been and is being governed by the Republic of Cuba, it has remained "foreign country"...

Court membership
- Chief Justice Melville Fuller Associate Justices John M. Harlan · David J. Brewer; Edward D. White · Rufus W. Peckham; Joseph McKenna · Oliver W. Holmes Jr. William R. Day · William H. Moody

Case opinion
- Majority: Fuller, joined by unanimous court
- Moody took no part in the consideration or decision of the case.

Pearcy v. Stranahan, 205 U.S. 257 (1907), was a 1907 ruling of the Supreme Court of the United States in a tax case in which it determined that the Isle of Pines off the southern coast of Cuba was a "foreign country" for the purposes of tariffs under the Dingley Tariff Act of 1897, even though Cuba and the United States had agreed that the legal status of that island would remain undetermined until they settled the question by treaty.

== Context ==
Under the terms of the 1898 Treaty of Paris that concluded the Spanish–American War, Spain dropped its claims to Cuba. Because of a lack of clarity in the language of that treaty with respect to the Isle of Pines (now known as the Isla de la Juventud or "isle of youth"), and because some business interests in the United States were promoting the annexation of the Isle of Pines, Cuba and the United States agreed in their May 1903 Treaty of Relations:

That the Isle of Pines shall be omitted from the proposed constitutional boundaries of Cuba, the title thereto being left to future adjustment by treaty.

Just weeks later, U.S. Secretary of State John Hay and Gonzalo de Quesada, Cuban Ambassador to the United States, signed a treaty recognizing Cuban sovereignty over Isle of Pines. The U.S. Senate withheld ratification of the Hay-Quesada Treaty until 1925, though it was supported by successive presidents and secretaries of state.

== The case ==
The Collector of the Port of New York seized cigars that Pearcy brought to New York City from Isle of Pines, "where they had been produced and manufactured". He asserted they were subject to a tariff under the Dingley Tariff Act, which imposed duties "on articles imported from foreign countries". Pearcy brought suit, claiming that the Isle of Pines was "in possession of and part of the United States".

Chief Justice Melville Fuller wrote for a unanimous court. He found, citing Jones v. United States (1890), that the court needed to examine what the legislative and executive branches had determined with respect to Isle of Pines. For example, after citing evidence that "all the world knew that [Isle of Pines] was an integral part of Cuba", he asked with respect to the Treaty of Paris: "Has the treaty been otherwise interpreted by the political departments of this government?" He found no evidence that U.S. authorities had taken actions that showed they viewed the Isle of Pines as falling within the jurisdiction of the United States. After reviewing the language of various international agreements, military orders, official correspondence, and the activities of government administrators at various levels, he found that the United States had never exercised sovereignty over the Isle of Pines, that since being ceded by Spain it had been under the de facto jurisdiction of Cuba, and that it was therefore foreign territory for tariff purposes. He concluded:

The Isle of Pines continues at least de facto, under the jurisdiction of the government of the Republic of Cuba, and that settles the question before us, because, as the United States have never taken possession of the Isle of Pines as having been ceded by the treaty of peace, and as it has been and is being governed by the Republic of Cuba, it has remained "foreign country" within the meaning of the Dingley Act. ... There has been no change of nationality for revenue purposes, but, on the contrary, the Cuban government has been recognized as rightfully exercising sovereignty over the Isle of Pines as a de facto government until otherwise provided. It must be treated as foreign, for this [United States] government has never taken, nor aimed to take, that possession in fact and in law which is essential to render it domestic.

In 1925 the Hay-Quesada Treaty was ratified between the U.S. and Cuba, recognizing Cuban sovereignty.

== See also ==
- Teller Amendment
- Platt Amendment
