= North American Cold Storage Co. v. City of Chicago =

North American Cold Storage Co. v. Chicago
- Supreme Court of the United States

Argued November 13, 1908 Decided December 7, 1908
- Full case name: North American Cold Storage Co. v. City of Chicago
- Citations: 211 U.S. 306 (more) 29 S. Ct. 101; 53 L. Ed. 195; 1908 U.S. LEXIS 1546

Case history
- Prior: 151 F. 120 (C.C.N.D. Ill. 1907)

Holding
- A post-deprivation remedy can be adequate for property interests.

Court membership
- Chief Justice Melville Fuller Associate Justices John M. Harlan · David J. Brewer; Edward D. White · Rufus W. Peckham; Joseph McKenna · Oliver W. Holmes Jr. William R. Day · William H. Moody

Case opinions
- Majority: Peckham, joined by Fuller, Harlan, White, McKenna, Holmes, Day, Moody
- Dissent: Brewer

North American Cold Storage Co. v. Chicago, 211 U.S. 306 (1908), was a case in which the United States Supreme Court held that no hearing was necessary prior to the seizure, condemnation, and destruction of food which was unwholesome and unfit for use.

== Facts ==
A Chicago ordinance allowed inspectors to inspect cold storage facilities for rotten food and summarily destroy unfit food. Chicago inspectors ordered the destruction of plaintiff’s poultry. The Company refused the order and sought an injunction.

== Issue ==
Whether the provisions in the cold storage ordinances of Chicago for destruction of unsafe and unwholesome food are unconstitutional as depriving persons of property without due process of law because they do not provide for notice and opportunity to be heard before such destruction.

== Holding ==
Under its police power, the state has the right to seize and destroy food which is unwholesome and unfit to use, and, in exercising such a power, due process of law, within the meaning of the Fourteenth Amendment, does not require previous notice and an opportunity to be heard; the party whose property is destroyed has a right of action after the act which is not affected by the ex parte condemnation of the state officers.

Where, under the police power of the state, the legislature may enact laws for the destruction of articles prejudicial to public health, it is, to a great extent, within its discretion as to whether any notice and hearing shall be given, and the fact that the articles might be kept for a period does not give the owners a right to notice and hearing.

== Importance ==
Wrongful loss of a property interest can always be made whole, unlike a liberty interest.

== See also ==
- Justice Rufus Wheeler Peckham
- List of United States Supreme Court cases, volume 211
- Chicago - the defendant
- North American Cold Storage - the plaintiff
