= Welch v. Swasey =

- Supreme Court of the United States

Argued April 15–16, 1909 Decided May 17, 1909
- Full case name: Francis C. Welch, Trustee, Plaintiff in Error, v. George B. Swasey, et al., as the Board of Appeal from the Building Commissioner of the City of Boston.
- Citations: 214 U.S. 91 (more) 29 S.Ct. 567; 53 L. Ed. 923; 1909 U.S. LEXIS 1895

Holding
- The statutes of Massachusetts, which limit the height of buildings in a certain quarter of a city, do not violate the constitution.

Court membership
- Chief Justice Melville Fuller Associate Justices John M. Harlan · David J. Brewer; Edward D. White · Rufus W. Peckham; Joseph McKenna · Oliver W. Holmes Jr. William R. Day · William H. Moody

Case opinion
- Majority: Peckham, joined by unanimous

Welch v. Swasey, 214 U.S. 91 (1909), was a decision by the United States Supreme Court, which held that the statutes of Massachusetts, chap. 333 of the Acts of 1904, and chap. 383 of the Acts of 1905, limiting the height of buildings in a certain quarter of a city, do not violate the Constitution of the United States.

Francis C. Welch owned property in a residential section of Boston where building height was legislatively limited to 100 feet (30.5 m). In other, more commercial sections of the city, the legislation permitted building height up to 125 feet (38.1 m). After he was denied a permit to construct a 124-foot (37.8 m) building on his property, Welch sued, contending “that the purposes of the acts are not such as justify the exercise of what is termed the police power, because, in fact, their real purpose was of an aesthetic nature, designed purely to preserve architectural symmetry and regular skylines.”

Delivering the opinion of the Court, Justice Rufus Wheeler Peckham acknowledged Welch's claim that “there is here a discrimination or classification between sections of the city,” but nonetheless adopted a standard of review very deferential to local government. “If the means employed, pursuant to the statute, have no real, substantial relation to a public object which government can accomplish, if the statutes are arbitrary and unreasonable, and beyond the necessities of the case, the courts will declare their invalidity,” wrote Peckham, also expressing that the Court “feels the greatest reluctance in interfering with the well-considered judgments of the courts of a state whose people are to be affected by the operation of the law.”

The reason for this reluctance was the Court's sense that, in such cases, the decision was location specific: “[t]he particular circumstances prevailing at the place or in the state where the law is, to become operative … are all matters which the state court is familiar with; but a like familiarity cannot be ascribed to this court.” Although not entitled to absolute deference, such a state court judgment “is entitled to the very greatest respect, and will only be interfered with, in cases of this kind, where the decision is, in our judgment, plainly wrong.”

== See also ==
- List of United States Supreme Court cases, volume 214
- Village of Euclid, Ohio v. Ambler Realty Co. (1926)
