= Patterson v. Colorado =

- Supreme Court of the United States

Argued March 5, 1907 Decided April 15, 1907
- Full case name: Patterson v. Colorado
- Citations: 205 U.S. 454 (more) 27 S. Ct. 556; 51 L. Ed. 879

Holding
- The First Amendment's purpose is to guard against prior restraints, not to prevent punishment of publications that may harm public welfare.

Court membership
- Chief Justice Melville Fuller Associate Justices John M. Harlan · David J. Brewer; Edward D. White · Rufus W. Peckham; Joseph McKenna · Oliver W. Holmes Jr. William R. Day · William H. Moody

Case opinions
- Majority: Holmes, joined by Fuller, White, Peckham, McKenna, Day, Moody
- Dissent: Brewer
- Dissent: Harlan

Laws applied
- U.S. Const. amend. I

Patterson v. Colorado, 205 U.S. 454 (1907), was a First Amendment case. Before 1919, the primary legal test used in the United States to determine if speech could be criminalized was the bad tendency test. Rooted in English common law, the test permitted speech to be outlawed if it had a tendency to harm public welfare. One of the earliest cases the Supreme Court heard addressing punishment after material was published was 1907's Patterson v. Colorado in which the Court used the bad tendency test to uphold contempt charges against a newspaper publisher who accused Colorado judges of acting on behalf of local utility companies.

== See also ==
- List of United States Supreme Court cases, volume 205
