= Schlemmer v. Buffalo, Rochester & Pittsburgh Railway Co. =

- Supreme Court of the United States

Argued January 18, 21, 1907 Decided March 4, 1907
- Full case name: Catherine Schlemmer v. Buffalo, Rochester & Pittsburgh Railway Co.
- Citations: 205 U.S. 1 (more) 27 S. Ct. 407; 51 L. Ed. 681; 1907 U.S. LEXIS 1447

Court membership
- Chief Justice Melville Fuller Associate Justices John M. Harlan · David J. Brewer; Edward D. White · Rufus W. Peckham; Joseph McKenna · Oliver W. Holmes Jr. William R. Day · William H. Moody

Case opinions
- Majority: Holmes, joined by Fuller, Harlan, White, Moody
- Dissent: Brewer, joined by Peckham, McKenna, Day

Schlemmer v. Buffalo, Rochester & Pittsburgh Railway Co., 205 U.S. 1 (1907), was a cause of action for the death of the plaintiff's intestate, Adam M. Schlemmer, while trying to couple a shovel car to a caboose.

== Background ==
=== Facts ===
The decedent was killed while following orders to couple railway cars that did not have a coupling device required by the Safety Appliance Act (Act). Plaintiff filed an action against defendant railroad company for the wrongful death of her intestate under the Safety Appliance Act.

The shovel car was part of a train on its way through Pennsylvania from a point in New York, and was not equipped with an automatic coupler in accordance with Federal law. Instead it had an iron drawbar fastened underneath the car by a pin and projecting about a foot beyond the car. The drawbar weighed about 80 pounds and its free and played up and down. On this end was an eye, and the coupling had to be done by lifting the free end possibly a foot, so that it should enter a slot in an automatic coupler on the caboose and allow a pin to drop through the eye. Due to the absence of buffers on the shovel car and to its being so high that it would pass over those on the caboose, the car and caboose would crush anyone between them if they came together and the coupling failed to be made. Schlemmer was ordered to make the coupling as the train was slowly approaching the caboose. To do so he had to get between the cars, and in endeavoring to obey the order and to guide the drawbar he rose a little too high, and, as he failed to hit the slot, the top of his head was crushed.

The plaintiff, in her declaration, alleged that the defendant was transporting the shovel car from state to state, and that the coupler was not such as was required by existing laws.

=== Procedural history ===
The trial judge decided that the deceased was guilty of contributory negligence but left uncertain what the negligence was. The Supreme Court of the State of Pennsylvania affirmed the trial court's grant of a nonsuit. (207 Pa. St. 198)

== Opinion of the court ==
The court reversed the grant of nonsuit, holding that the decedent had not assumed the risk. The court held, as preliminary matters that the railway car was in the course of interstate transportation, and it was a car within the contemplation of § 2 of the Act. Thus, under § 8 of the act, the decedent could not be deemed to have assumed the risk of the injury or death. The court noted that to the extent the state court alternatively indicated that, even if assumption of risk did not apply, the decedent was guilty of contributory negligence, such statement ran afoul of the Act because the state court was merely substituting contributory negligence for assumption of risk.

== See also ==
- List of United States Supreme Court cases, volume 205
