= United States ex rel. West v. Hitchcock =

- Supreme Court of the United States

Argued January 30, 1907 Decided March 4, 1907
- Full case name: United States ex rel. West v. Hitchcock
- Citations: 205 U.S. 80 (more) 27 S. Ct. 423; 51 L. Ed. 718; 1907 U.S. LEXIS 1453

Court membership
- Chief Justice Melville Fuller Associate Justices John M. Harlan · David J. Brewer; Edward D. White · Rufus W. Peckham; Joseph McKenna · Oliver W. Holmes Jr. William R. Day · William H. Moody

Case opinion
- Majority: Holmes, joined by unanimous

United States ex rel. West v. Hitchcock, 205 U.S. 80 (1907), regards a case where the Secretary of the Interior has authority to pass on the right of one claiming to be a member of a band of Indians to select land under an agreement ratified by an act of Congress, his jurisdiction does not depend upon his decision's being right.

The United States promised to allot 160 acres (0.65 km^{2}) to each member of the Wichita band of Indians under the Act of March 2, 1895, 28 Stat. 876, 895. This promise may confer a right on every single member of the band, but the primary decision as to who the members are must come from the Secretary of the Interior, and, in the absence of any indication in the act to allow an appeal to the courts for applicants who are dissatisfied, mandamus will not issue to require the Secretary to approve the selection of one claiming to be an adopted member of the tribe but whose application the Secretary has denied.

In view of long established practice of the Department of the Interior, and the undoubted power of Congress over the Indians, this Court will hesitate to construe the language of §§ 441, 463, Rev.Stat., as not giving the Department of the Interior control over the adoption of whites into the Indian tribes.

26 App.D.C. 290 affirmed.

== See also ==
- List of United States Supreme Court cases, volume 205
