= List of United States Supreme Court cases, volume 214 =

Supreme Court of the United States
- Interactive map of Supreme Court of the United States
- 38°53′26″N 77°00′16″W
- Established: March 4, 1789; 236 years ago<
- Location: Washington, D.C.
- Coordinates: 38°53′26″N 77°00′16″W
- Composition method: Presidential nomination with Senate confirmation
- Authorised by: Constitution of the United States, Art. III, § 1
- Judge term length: life tenure, subject to impeachment and removal
- Number of positions: 9 (by statute)
- Website: supremecourt.gov

This is a list of cases reported in volume 214 of United States Reports, decided by the Supreme Court of the United States in 1909.

== Justices of the Supreme Court at the time of volume 214 U.S. ==
The Supreme Court is established by Article III, Section 1 of the Constitution of the United States, which says: "The judicial Power of the United States, shall be vested in one supreme Court . . .". The size of the Court is not specified; the Constitution leaves it to Congress to set the number of justices. Under the Judiciary Act of 1789 Congress originally fixed the number of justices at six (one chief justice and five associate justices). Since 1789 Congress has varied the size of the Court from six to seven, nine, ten, and back to nine justices (always including one chief justice).

When the cases in volume 214 were decided the Court comprised the following nine members:

Portrait	Justice	Office	Home State	Succeeded	Date confirmed by the Senate (Vote)	Tenure on Supreme Court
	Melville Fuller	Chief Justice	Illinois	Morrison Waite	July 20, 1888 (41–20)	October 8, 1888 – July 4, 1910 (Died)
	John Marshall Harlan	Associate Justice	Kentucky	David Davis	November 29, 1877 (Acclamation)	December 10, 1877 – October 14, 1911 (Died)
	David Josiah Brewer	Associate Justice	Kansas	Stanley Matthews	December 18, 1889 (53–11)	January 6, 1890 – March 28, 1910 (Died)
	Edward Douglass White	Associate Justice	Louisiana	Samuel Blatchford	February 19, 1894 (Acclamation)	March 12, 1894 – December 18, 1910 (Continued as chief justice)
	Rufus W. Peckham	Associate Justice	New York	Howell Edmunds Jackson	December 9, 1895 (Acclamation)	January 6, 1896 – October 24, 1909 (Died)
	Joseph McKenna	Associate Justice	California	Stephen Johnson Field	January 21, 1898 (Acclamation)	January 26, 1898 – January 5, 1925 (Retired)
	Oliver Wendell Holmes Jr.	Associate Justice	Massachusetts	Horace Gray	December 4, 1902 (Acclamation)	December 8, 1902 – January 12, 1932 (Retired)
	William R. Day	Associate Justice	Ohio	George Shiras Jr.	February 23, 1903 (Acclamation)	March 2, 1903 – November 13, 1922 (Retired)
	William Henry Moody	Associate Justice	Massachusetts	Henry Billings Brown	December 12, 1906 (Acclamation)	December 17, 1906 – November 20, 1910 (Retired)

== Citation style ==
Under the Judiciary Act of 1789 the federal court structure at the time comprised District Courts, which had general trial jurisdiction; Circuit Courts, which had mixed trial and appellate (from the US District Courts) jurisdiction; and the United States Supreme Court, which had appellate jurisdiction over the federal District and Circuit courts—and for certain issues over state courts. The Supreme Court also had limited original jurisdiction (i.e., in which cases could be filed directly with the Supreme Court without first having been heard by a lower federal or state court). There were one or more federal District Courts and/or Circuit Courts in each state, territory, or other geographical region.

The Judiciary Act of 1891 created the United States Courts of Appeals and reassigned the jurisdiction of most routine appeals from the district and circuit courts to these appellate courts. The Act created nine new courts that were originally known as the "United States Circuit Courts of Appeals." The new courts had jurisdiction over most appeals of lower court decisions. The Supreme Court could review either legal issues that a court of appeals certified or decisions of court of appeals by writ of certiorari.

Bluebook citation style is used for case names, citations, and jurisdictions.

- "# Cir." = United States Court of Appeals
  - e.g., "3d Cir." = United States Court of Appeals for the Third Circuit
- "C.C.D." = United States Circuit Court for the District of . . .
  - e.g.,"C.C.D.N.J." = United States Circuit Court for the District of New Jersey
- "D." = United States District Court for the District of . . .
  - e.g.,"D. Mass." = United States District Court for the District of Massachusetts
- "E." = Eastern; "M." = Middle; "N." = Northern; "S." = Southern; "W." = Western
  - e.g.,"C.C.S.D.N.Y." = United States Circuit Court for the Southern District of New York
  - e.g.,"M.D. Ala." = United States District Court for the Middle District of Alabama
- "Ct. Cl." = United States Court of Claims
- The abbreviation of a state's name alone indicates the highest appellate court in that state's judiciary at the time.
  - e.g.,"Pa." = Supreme Court of Pennsylvania
  - e.g.,"Me." = Supreme Judicial Court of Maine

== List of cases in volume 214 U.S. ==
Case Name	Page & year	Opinion of the Court	Concurring opinion(s)	Dissenting opinion(s)	Lower Court	Disposition
Compton v. Alabama	1 (1909)	Harlan	none	none	Ala.	affirmed
In re Riggs	9 (1909)	Brewer	none	none	S.D.N.Y.	mandamus denied
Whitcomb v. White	15 (1909)	Brewer	none	none	Idaho	affirmed
Smithsonian Inst. v. St. John	19 (1909)	Brewer	none	none	N.Y. Sup. Ct.	dismissed
Merchants' Nat'l Bank v. United States	33 (1909)	White	none	none	Ct. Cl.	affirmed
J.M. Ceballos & Co. v. United States	47 (1909)	White	none	none	Ct. Cl.	reversed
Goodrich v. Ferris	71 (1909)	White	none	none	C.C.N.D. Cal.	dismissed
Woodwell v. United States	82 (1909)	White	none	none	Ct. Cl.	affirmed
Welch v. Swasey	91 (1909)	Peckham	none	none	Mass.	affirmed
Gray v. Noholoa	108 (1909)	Peckham	none	none	Sup. Ct. Terr. Haw.	affirmed
Collins v. O'Neil	113 (1909)	Peckham	none	none	multiple	affirmed
United States ex rel. Parish v. MacVeagh	124 (1909)	McKenna	none	none	D.C. Cir.	reversed
District of Columbia v. Brooke	138 (1909)	McKenna	none	none	D.C. Cir.	reversed
Texas & P.R.R. Co. v. Eastin	153 (1909)	McKenna	none	none	Tex.	affirmed
Dupree v. Mansur	161 (1909)	Holmes	none	none	5th Cir.	reversed
Ubarri v. Laborde	168 (1909)	Holmes	none	none	D.P.R.	reversed
Laborde v. Ubarri	173 (1909)	Holmes	none	none	D.P.R.	affirmed
Leech v. Louisiana	175 (1909)	Holmes	none	none	La.	affirmed
City of Des Moines v. Des Moines C.R.R. Co.	179 (1909)	Holmes	none	none	C.C.S.D. Iowa	reversed
Peck v. Tribune Co.	185 (1909)	Holmes	none	none	7th Cir.	reversed
Chesapeake & O.R.R. Co. v. McDonald	191 (1909)	Day	none	none	Ky.	dismissed
Rogers v. Jones	196 (1909)	Fuller	none	none	Miss.	dismissed
Washington v. Oregon	205 (1909)	Brewer	none	none	original	rehearing denied
Adams E. Co. v. Kentucky	218 (1909)	Brewer	none	none	Ky. Cir. Ct.	reversed
Cabrera v. American C. Bank	224 (1909)	McKenna	none	none	D.P.R.	affirmed
Bong v. Alfred S.C.A. Co.	236 (1909)	McKenna	none	none	2d Cir.	affirmed
Kreigh v. Westinghouse et al. Co.	249 (1909)	Day	none	none	8th Cir.	reversed
Santiago v. Nogueras	260 (1909)	Moody	none	none	D.P.R.	affirmed
Tupiño v. La Compania Gen.	268 (1909)	Moody	none	none	Phil.	dismissed
Western Union T. Co. v. Chiles	274 (1909)	Moody	none	none	Va.	reversed
Bryant v. Swofford Bros. D.G. Co.	279 (1909)	Moody	none	none	8th Cir.	affirmed
J. Wild & Co. v. Provident L. & T. Co.	292 (1909)	Moody	none	none	3d Cir.	reversed
Southern R.R. Co. v. St. Louis H. & G. Co.	297 (1909)	Brewer	none	none	7th Cir.	reversed
United States v. National E. Bank	302 (1909)	White	none	none	1st Cir.	reversed
Oceanic S.N. Co. v. Stranahan	320 (1909)	White	none	none	C.C.S.D.N.Y.	affirmed
International M.M. Co. v. Stranahan	344 (1909)	White	none	none	C.C.S.D.N.Y.	affirmed
Weems S.B. Co. v. People's S.B. Co.	345 (1909)	Peckham	none	none	4th Cir.	reversed
English v. Arizona ex rel. Griffith	359 (1909)	McKenna	none	none	Sup. Ct. Terr. Ariz.	affirmed
Expanded M. Co. v. Bradford	366 (1909)	Day	none	none	multiple	multiple
United States v. Shipp	386 (1909)	Fuller	none	Peckham	original	contempt found
Chicago et al. R.R. Co. v. Williams	492 (1909)	per curiam	none	Holmes	8th Cir.	dismissed

== See also ==
- Certificate of division
