= Schlemmer =

Schlemmer may refer to:

== People with the surname ==
- Ferdinand Louis Schlemmer (1892–1947), American artist
- Hans Schlemmer (1893–1973), general of the mountain troops in the Wehrmacht during World War II
- Max Schlemmer, Maximilian "Max" Joseph August Schlemmer (1856–1935), known as the "King of Laysan", German immigrant to the United States of America
- Oskar Schlemmer (1888–1943), German painter, sculptor, designer and choreographer associated with the Bauhaus school
- Raymond Schlemmer was a seminal figure in the early history of Scouting in France, from 1922 to 1952. In late 1937, French Scouting sent Scoutmaster Schlemmer.
- Sebastian Schlemmer (born 1978), German actor and well known for his role of Sebastian von Lahnstein in the soap opera Verbotene Liebe (Forbidden Love)

== Other uses ==
- Schlemmer v. Buffalo, Rochester & Pittsburgh Railway Co. 205 U.S. 1 (1907) was a cause of action for the death of the plaintiff's intestate, Adam M. Schlemmer
- Hammacher Schlemmer, an American catalog founded in 1848
