= Halter v. Nebraska =

- Supreme Court of the United States

Submitted January 23, 1907 Decided March 4, 1907
- Full case name: Halter v. Nebraska
- Citations: 205 U.S. 34 (more) 27 S. Ct. 419; 51 L. Ed. 696; 1907 U.S. LEXIS 1450

Court membership
- Chief Justice Melville Fuller Associate Justices John M. Harlan · David J. Brewer; Edward D. White · Rufus W. Peckham; Joseph McKenna · Oliver W. Holmes Jr. William R. Day · William H. Moody

Case opinions
- Majority: Harlan, joined by Fuller, Brewer, White, McKenna, Holmes, Day, Moody
- Dissent: Peckham

Halter v. Nebraska, 205 U.S. 34 (1907), was a United States Supreme Court case involving a Nebraska statute that prevented and punished desecration of the flag of the United States and prohibited the sale of articles upon which there is a representation of the flag for advertising purposes. Halter was charged under this law for printing the flag on the label of a bottle of beer, for which he was fined $50 plus the costs of the prosecution. The court upheld the law.

More recent case law, Texas v. Johnson (1989) and United States v. Eichman (1990), holds that flag desecration is protected by the First Amendment.

== Decision ==
The court held that the statute was not unconstitutional either as depriving the owner of such articles of his property without due process of law, or as denying him the equal protection of the laws because of the exception from the operation of the statute of newspapers, periodicals, or books upon which the flag may be represented if disconnected from any advertisement.

Except as restrained by its own fundamental law or by the supreme law of the land, a state possesses all legislative power consistent with a republican form of government, and it may by legislation provide not only for the health, morals and safety of its people, but for the common good as involved in their wellbeing, peace, happiness and prosperity.

There are matters which, by congressional legislation, may be brought within the exclusive control of the national government but over which, in the absence of such legislation, the state may exert some control in the interest of its own people, and although the national flag of the United States is the emblem of national sovereignty and a congressional enactment in regard to its use might supersede state legislation in regard thereto, until Congress does act, a state has power to prohibit the use of the national flag for advertising purposes within its jurisdiction.

The privileges of citizenship and the rights inhering in personal liberty are subject in their enjoyment to such reasonable restraints as may be required for the public good, and no one has a right of property to use the nation's emblem for individual purposes.

A state may consistently make a classification among its people based on some reasonable ground which bears a just and proper relation to the classification and is not arbitrary.
