= Wilmington Star Mining Co. v. Fulton =

- Supreme Court of the United States

Argued January 7, 1907 Decided March 4, 1907
- Full case name: Wilmington Star Mining Company v. Fulton
- Citations: 205 U.S. 60 (more) 27 S. Ct. 412; 51 L. Ed. 708; 1907 U.S. LEXIS 1452

Court membership
- Chief Justice Melville Fuller Associate Justices John M. Harlan · David J. Brewer; Edward D. White · Rufus W. Peckham; Joseph McKenna · Oliver W. Holmes Jr. William R. Day · William H. Moody

Case opinion
- Majority: White, joined by unanimous

Wilmington Star Mining Co. v. Fulton, 205 U.S. 60 (1907), was a case concerning whether it is an appropriate exercise of the police power of the state to regulate the use of mining properties, and that mine owners are not deprived of their property, privileges, or immunities without due process of law, or denied the equal protection of the laws, by the Illinois Mining Statute of 1899, which requires the employment of licensed mine managers and mine examiners and imposes upon the mine owners liability for the willful failure of the manager and examiner to furnish a reasonably safe place for the workmen.

== Arguments & rulings ==
It is within the power of the state to change or modify, in accord with its conceptions of public policy, the principles of the common law in regard to the relation of master and servant, and in cases within the proper scope of the police power, to impose upon the master liability for the willful act of his employee.

As construed by the highest court of that state, under the Mining Act of Illinois of 1899, a mine manager and mine examiner are vice-principals of the owner and engaged in the performance of duties which the owner cannot so delegate to others as to relieve himself from responsibility.

Where two concurring causes contribute to an accident to an employee, the fact that the master is not responsible for one of them does not absolve him from liability for the other cause for which he is responsible.

Where there is no evidence sustaining certain counts in the declaration as to the defendant's negligence, he is entitled to an instruction that no recovery can be had under those counts and where, as it was in this case, the refusal to so instruct is prejudicial error, the verdict cannot be maintained either at law or under § 57 of the Illinois Practice Act.

== See also ==
- List of United States Supreme Court cases, volume 205
