= Tinsley v. Treat =

- Supreme Court of the United States

Argued December 3–4, 1906 Decided March 4, 1907
- Full case name: Tinsley v. Treat, United States Marshal
- Citations: 205 U.S. 20 (more) 27 S. Ct. 430; 51 L. Ed. 689; 1907 U.S. LEXIS 1448

Court membership
- Chief Justice Melville Fuller Associate Justices John M. Harlan · David J. Brewer; Edward D. White · Rufus W. Peckham; Joseph McKenna · Oliver W. Holmes Jr. William R. Day · William H. Moody

Case opinions
- Majority: Fuller, joined by Brewer, White, Peckham, McKenna, Holmes, Day
- Dissent: Harlan
- Moody took no part in the consideration or decision of the case.

Tinsley v. Treat, 205 U.S. 20 (1907), was a case decided by the Supreme Court of the United States that found while an indictment in a removal proceeding constitutes prima facie evidence of probable cause, it is not conclusive, so evidence put forth by a defendant showing that no offense triable in the district to which removal is sought had been committed is admissible, and its exclusion is not mere error, but the denial of a right secured under the Federal Constitution.

The provisions of the Safety Appliance Act of March 2, 1893, amended April 1, 1896, declared it to be unlawful for any common carrier engaged in interstate commerce to haul or permit to be hauled or used on its line any car used in moving interstate commerce not equipped with couplers coupling automatically by impact, and which can be uncoupled without the necessity of men going between the ends of the cars, relate to all kinds of cars running on the rails, including locomotives and steam shovel cars. Johnson v. Southern Pacific.

The object of the statute was to protect the lives and limbs of railroad employees by rendering it unnecessary for men operating the couplers to go between the ends of the cars, and the words "used in moving interstate traffic" occurring therein are not to be taken in a narrow sense.

In a suit based upon the Safety Appliance Act of March 2, 1893, as amended April 1, 1896, the plaintiff is not called upon to negative the proviso of § 6 of said act either in his pleadings or proofs. Such proviso merely creates an exception, and if the defendant wishes to rely thereon, the burden is upon it to bring itself within the terms of the exception; those who set up such an exception must establish it.

Assumption of risk as extended to dangerous conditions of machinery, premises, and the like, obviously shades into negligence as commonly understood. The difference between the two is one of degree, rather than of kind.

Section 8 of the Automatic Coupler Act having exonerated the employee from assumption of risk under specified conditions, the employee's rights in that regard should not be sacrificed by charging him with assumption of risk under another name, for example, with contributory negligence.

In this case, the so-called contributory negligence of the deceased employee was so involved with and dependent upon erroneous views of the statute that the judgment complained of must be reversed.

== See also ==
- List of United States Supreme Court cases, volume 205
