= Hay–Quesada Treaty =

1904 treaty between the United States and Cuba

Hay-Quesada Treaty
Treaty for the adjustment of title to the ownership of the Isle of Pines
- Signed: 2 March 1904
- Location: Washington
- Effective: 23 March 1925
- Signatories: Cuba; United States
- Citations: 44 Stat. 1997; TS 709; 6 Bevans 1124; 127 LNTS 143

The Hay–Quesada Treaty is the agreement reached between the governments of Cuba and the United States, which was negotiated in 1904, but not ratified by both parties until 1925. By the terms of this treaty the U.S. recognized Cuban sovereignty over the territory of the Isle of Pines off the southern coast of the island of Cuba, which since 1978 has been known as Isla de la Juventud (Isle of Youth).

== Background ==
Following the conclusion of hostilities in the Cuban War for Independence from Spain, the United States, which had entered the war in its final months in support of the Cubans, required that the new Republic of Cuba meet several conditions before the U.S. would withdraw its troops from Cuba. These conditions were set out in a U.S. law known as the Platt Amendment and the one that applied to the Isle of Pines read: "That the Isle of Pines shall be omitted from the proposed constitutional boundaries of Cuba, the title thereto being left to future adjustment by treaty." A New York Times editorial said this reflected the fact that the Isle of Pines had not been expressly considered during negotiations with Spain nor its status made clear in the treaty with Spain. It noted that the island's ties to Cuba and the province of Havana were so clearly established that the U.S. government must be considering "taking it only by purchase" because "It does not appear that it could be lawfully taken any other way." But public discussion in the U.S. did contemplate the Isle's attractions:

In almost every way it is a most desirable possession. Its climate is far healthier than that of Cuba, yellow and malarial fevers being almost unknown. ... There are excellent harbors. ... the rivers are numerous and several of them are navigable some miles inland; there are medicinal springs at Santa Fe–everything that could make the place desirable as a Winter resort seems there. ... It is extremely rich in natural resources ... marble of exquisite quality ... mines of silver, quicksilver, and iron ... mahogany trees, including many of the male trees, which produce the class of wood from which furniture used to be made a hundred years ago, and which is now becoming very scarce ... Then there are cedar and various other woods, besides the immense growth of pines, from which the place takes its name, and the island also produces sulphur, turpentine, pitch and tar, tobacco, tortoise shell, and various other commodities.

When the first Constitution of the Republic of Cuba was initially adopted on February 21, 1901, it did not mention the Isle of Pines as part of the nation's territory. The Cuban Constitutional Convention accepted the Platt Amendment's provisions on a narrow vote in May 1901. After U.S. forces handed administration of the nation to the Cuban government on May 20, 1902, the Association of American Settlers on the Isle of Pines was quick to complain that they lacked government services and were "practically in a state of chaos as far as civil order is concerned", though some in the U.S. did not take the complaint seriously, calling the Isle "a country which appears to exist at the present time solely for the purpose of supplying material for the comedian". One attorney for U.S. companies doing business on Isle of Pines called for government action but undercut his argument: "There is absolutely no form of Government on the island, and the only authority visible is a guard consisting of eight constables representing the Cuban Government. So far as I know, they have never made an arrest, because the people of Isle of Pines are most orderly."

== Treaty ==
U.S. Secretary of State John Hay had served as U.S. Ambassador to Great Britain during the Spanish–American War. He had insisted then that the U.S. acted "from the highest motives of humanity and in no sense as a war of conquest" and considered the annexation of Isle of Pines by the U.S. "an iniquity". On July 2, 1903, the Cuban Secretary of State and the U.S. Ambassador in Cuba, signed treaties securing the U.S. right to lease lands at Guantanamo Bay and recognizing Cuban sovereignty over Isle of Pines. The Cuban Senate ratified both on July 16.

In the U.S. Senate, Senator Boies Penrose led the opposition to the Isle of Pines treaty on behalf of U.S. business interests, including some large investors and a friend who had built a large mansion. He claimed they had received assurances of U.S. sovereignty from the Military Governor of Cuba General Leonard Wood. When the United States Senate ratified only the lease treaty and failed to act on the Isle of Pines treaty within the time the treaty allowed, Hay and the Cuban ambassador in the U.S. Gonzalo de Quesada y Aróstegui signed a second version addressing the status of the Isle of Pines on March 2, 1904. It avoided specifying a time within which it needed to be ratified.

== Ratification ==
For years the U.S. Senate did not ratify the treaty, though from 1903 on every U.S. president and Secretary of State urged its ratification and the Senate Foreign Relations Committee sent it to the floor and recommended its ratification three times. In 1907, the U.S. Supreme Court ruled in a case disputing whether goods imported from the Isle of Pines should be subject to a tariff "on articles imported from foreign countries". Without addressing the issue of sovereignty per se, in Pearcy v. Stranahan Chief Justice Melville Fuller found for a unanimous court that the United States had never exercised sovereignty over the Isle of Pines and that since being ceded by Spain it had been under the de facto jurisdiction of Cuba, and it was therefore foreign territory for tariff purposes.

The treaty was brought up again for ratification by the U.S. Senate in February 1924. Senator William E. Borah argued that U.S. citizens–700 of the island's 4,250 residents were U.S. citizens–owned 90% of the land and had invested there in anticipation that Isle of Pines would enjoy a status similar to that of Puerto Rico. Almost all of them had arrived since the Cubans had agreed to delay resolution of the island's legal status, though few were thought to remain for more than a few years. Senator Royal S. Copeland argued that Isle of Pines had strategic value and could serve as "a naval, military and air base of greatest importance to our protection of the [Panama] Canal". He proposed paying Cuba for its administration of the island. A committee of Americans who owned land in Isle of Pines visited President Calvin Coolidge and told him that ceding the island to Cuba would constitute "a blot on American history". Cuban legislators argued that the original negotiations had recognized that the sovereignty of the Isle of Pines was part and parcel of the granting of the Guantanamo lease. Some 65 of the 116 members of the Cuban House of Representatives wrote a letter calling for ratification of the treaty. It said that were the treaty rejected "the Republic of Cuba surely would have the right to ask the immediate evacuation of the naval stations established on Cuban territory". A committee of Cuban businessmen called for ratification, described the Isle's inhabitants as Cubans who fought for independence from Spain, and cited the joint resolution adopted by the U.S. Congress in 1898, the Teller Amendment, that disavowed any U.S. intention to exercise sovereignty over Cuba. They disputed any attempt to divorce the island of Cuba from its thousands of adjacent islands and keys. Coolidge argued without reserve for ratification.

Writing in The American Journal of International Law in 1923, international law scholar James Brown Scott noted that American residents of Isle of Pines should by now be accustomed to Cuban rule. He said that whether the treaty is ratified or not, "Cuba exercises its sovereignty over the island and doubtless will continue to do so. The proposed treaty therefore has merely a sentimental value, but sentiment is perhaps the strongest bond between nations ..." The treaty was ratified by the United States Senate on March 13, 1925. Cuban President Alfredo Zayas and President-elect Gerardo Machado praised its action, as did newspapers throughout Latin America.

In 1925 in Foreign Affairs, Benjamin H. Williams praised the ratification:

The relinquishment by the United States of its claim to the Isle of Pines may be regarded as but a minor territorial adjustment, but it carries more than ordinary significance because of its effect upon the intangible prestige of this country. Here ... certain material interests were staked against Latin-American good will; and the fact that the latter consideration prevailed seems an augury of closer cooperation in the western hemisphere.
