= Chicago Board of Trade v. Christie Grain & Stock Co. =

Chicago Board of Trade v. Christie Grain
- Supreme Court of the United States

Argued April 20, 24–25, 1905 Decided May 8, 1905
- Full case name: Board of Trade of the City of Chicago, Petitioner v. Christie Grain & Stock Company and C. C. Christie; L. A. Kinsey Company et al., Petitioners, v. Board of Trade of the City of Chicago
- Citations: 198 U.S. 236 (more) 25 S. Ct. 637; 49 L. Ed. 1031

Holding
- The sales of grain for future delivery and the substitution of parties was upheld.

Court membership
- Chief Justice Melville Fuller Associate Justices John M. Harlan · David J. Brewer; Henry B. Brown · Edward D. White; Rufus W. Peckham · Joseph McKenna; Oliver W. Holmes Jr. · William R. Day

Case opinions
- Majority: Holmes, joined by Fuller, Brown, White, Peckham, McKenna
- Dissent: Harlan
- Dissent: Brewer
- Dissent: Day

Chicago Board of Trade v. Christie Grain & Stock Co., 198 U.S. 236 (1905), was a decision by the United States Supreme Court, which upheld sales of American grain for future delivery provided for by the rules of the Chicago Board of Trade of the state of Illinois. Justice Oliver Wendell Holmes Jr. delivered the majority opinion of the court, in which he wrote:

People will endeavor to forecast the future and to make agreements according to their prophecy.

== See also ==
- List of United States Supreme Court cases, volume 198
