= List of United States Supreme Court cases, volume 172 =

Supreme Court of the United States
- Interactive map of Supreme Court of the United States
- 38°53′26″N 77°00′16″W
- Established: March 4, 1789; 236 years ago
- Location: Washington, D.C.
- Coordinates: 38°53′26″N 77°00′16″W
- Composition method: Presidential nomination with Senate confirmation
- Authorised by: Constitution of the United States, Art. III, § 1
- Judge term length: life tenure, subject to impeachment and removal
- Number of positions: 9 (by statute)
- Website: supremecourt.gov

This is a list of cases reported in volume 172 of United States Reports, decided by the Supreme Court of the United States in 1898 and 1899.

== Justices of the Supreme Court at the time of volume 172 U.S. ==
The Supreme Court is established by Article III, Section 1 of the Constitution of the United States, which says: "The judicial Power of the United States, shall be vested in one supreme Court . . .". The size of the Court is not specified; the Constitution leaves it to Congress to set the number of justices. Under the Judiciary Act of 1789 Congress originally fixed the number of justices at six (one chief justice and five associate justices). Since 1789 Congress has varied the size of the Court from six to seven, nine, ten, and back to nine justices (always including one chief justice).

When the cases in volume 172 were decided the Court comprised the following nine members:

Portrait	Justice	Office	Home State	Succeeded	Date confirmed by the Senate (Vote)	Tenure on Supreme Court
	Melville Fuller	Chief Justice	Illinois	Morrison Waite	July 20, 1888 (41–20)	October 8, 1888 – July 4, 1910 (Died)
	John Marshall Harlan	Associate Justice	Kentucky	David Davis	November 29, 1877 (Acclamation)	December 10, 1877 – October 14, 1911 (Died)
	Horace Gray	Associate Justice	Massachusetts	Nathan Clifford	December 20, 1881 (51–5)	January 9, 1882 – September 15, 1902 (Died)
	David Josiah Brewer	Associate Justice	Kansas	Stanley Matthews	December 18, 1889 (53–11)	January 6, 1890 – March 28, 1910 (Died)
	Henry Billings Brown	Associate Justice	Michigan	Samuel Freeman Miller	December 29, 1890 (Acclamation)	January 5, 1891 – May 28, 1906 (Retired)
	George Shiras Jr.	Associate Justice	Pennsylvania	Joseph P. Bradley	July 26, 1892 (Acclamation)	October 10, 1892 – February 23, 1903 (Retired)
	Edward Douglass White	Associate Justice	Louisiana	Samuel Blatchford	February 19, 1894 (Acclamation)	March 12, 1894 – December 18, 1910 (Continued as chief justice)
	Rufus W. Peckham	Associate Justice	New York	Howell Edmunds Jackson	December 9, 1895 (Acclamation)	January 6, 1896 – October 24, 1909 (Died)
	Joseph McKenna	Associate Justice	California	Stephen Johnson Field	January 21, 1898 (Acclamation)	January 26, 1898 – January 5, 1925 (Retired)

== Citation style ==
Under the Judiciary Act of 1789 the federal court structure at the time comprised District Courts, which had general trial jurisdiction; Circuit Courts, which had mixed trial and appellate (from the US District Courts) jurisdiction; and the United States Supreme Court, which had appellate jurisdiction over the federal District and Circuit courts—and for certain issues over state courts. The Supreme Court also had limited original jurisdiction (i.e., in which cases could be filed directly with the Supreme Court without first having been heard by a lower federal or state court). There were one or more federal District Courts and/or Circuit Courts in each state, territory, or other geographical region.

The Judiciary Act of 1891 created the United States Courts of Appeals and reassigned the jurisdiction of most routine appeals from the district and circuit courts to these appellate courts. The Act created nine new courts that were originally known as the "United States Circuit Courts of Appeals." The new courts had jurisdiction over most appeals of lower court decisions. The Supreme Court could review either legal issues that a court of appeals certified or decisions of court of appeals by writ of certiorari.

Bluebook citation style is used for case names, citations, and jurisdictions.

- "# Cir." = United States Court of Appeals
  - e.g., "3d Cir." = United States Court of Appeals for the Third Circuit
- "C.C.D." = United States Circuit Court for the District of . . .
  - e.g.,"C.C.D.N.J." = United States Circuit Court for the District of New Jersey
- "D." = United States District Court for the District of . . .
  - e.g.,"D. Mass." = United States District Court for the District of Massachusetts
- "E." = Eastern; "M." = Middle; "N." = Northern; "S." = Southern; "W." = Western
  - e.g.,"C.C.S.D.N.Y." = United States Circuit Court for the Southern District of New York
  - e.g.,"M.D. Ala." = United States District Court for the Middle District of Alabama
- "Ct. Cl." = United States Court of Claims
- The abbreviation of a state's name alone indicates the highest appellate court in that state's judiciary at the time.
  - e.g.,"Pa." = Supreme Court of Pennsylvania
  - e.g.,"Me." = Supreme Judicial Court of Maine

== List of cases in volume 172 U.S. ==
Case Name	Page and year	Opinion of the Court	Concurring opinion(s)	Dissenting opinion(s)	Lower Court	Disposition
City of Walla Walla v. Walla Walla Water Company	1 (1898)	Brown	none	none	C.C.D. Wash.	affirmed
Andersen v. Treat	24 (1898)	Fuller	none	none	E.D. Va.	affirmed
Pittsburgh Railway Company v. Board of Public Works	32 (1898)	Gray	none	none	C.C.D.W. Va.	affirmed
United States v. Wardwell	48 (1898)	Brewer	none	none	Ct. Cl.	affirmed
Green Bay and Mississippi Canal Company v. Patten Paper Company	58 (1898)	Shiras	none	none	Wis.	reversed
Meyer v. City of Richmond	82 (1898)	McKenna	none	Fuller	Va.	affirmed
McCullough v. Virginia	102 (1898)	Brewer	none	Peckham	Va.	reversed
United States v. Ranlett	133 (1898)	Fuller	none	none	5th Cir.	reversed
Harkrader v. Wadley	148 (1898)	Shiras	none	none	C.C.W.D. Va.	reversed
New Mexico v. United States Trust Company	171 (1898)	McKenna	none	none	Sup. Ct. Terr. N.M.	affirmed
The Elfrida	186 (1898)	Brown	none	none	5th Cir.	reversed
United States v. Loughrey	206 (1898)	Brown	none	White	7th Cir.	affirmed
Grant v. Buckner	232 (1898)	Brewer	none	none	La.	affirmed
Blake v. McClung	239 (1898)	Harlan	none	Brewer	Tenn.	multiple
Village of Norwood v. Baker	269 (1898)	Harlan	none	Brewer	C.C.S.D. Ohio	affirmed
Winston v. United States	303 (1899)	Gray	none	none	D.C. Cir.	reversed
Bellingham Bay and British Columbia Railroad Company v. City of New Whatcom	314 (1899)	Brewer	none	none	Wash.	affirmed
Bellingham Bay Improvement Company v. City of New Whatcom	320 (1899)	Brewer	none	none	Wash.	affirmed
United States v. Bliss	321 (1899)	Brewer	none	none	Ct. Cl.	reversed
United States v. Ingram	327 (1899)	Brewer	none	none	Ct. Cl.	reversed
Clark v. City of Kansas City	334 (1899)	McKenna	none	none	Kan.	dismissed
United States v. Buffalo Natural Gas Fuel Company	339 (1899)	Peckham	none	none	2d Cir.	affirmed
Scott v. United States	343 (1899)	Peckham	none	none	C.C.S.D.N.Y.	affirmed
Missouri, Kansas and Texas Trust Company v. Krumseig	351 (1899)	Shiras	none	none	8th Cir.	affirmed
Washington Market Company v. District of Columbia	361 (1899)	White	none	none	D.C. Cir.	affirmed
Simpson v. United States	372 (1899)	White	none	none	Ct. Cl.	affirmed
Home for Incurables v. Colville	383 (1899)	White	none	none	D.C. Cir.	reversed
Sonnentheil v. Christian Moerlein Brewing Company	401 (1899)	Brown	none	none	5th Cir.	affirmed
Utter v. Franklin	416 (1899)	Brown	none	none	Sup. Ct. Terr. Ariz.	reversed
Capital National Bank v. First National Bank	425 (1899)	Fuller	none	none	Neb.	dismissed
Capital National Bank v. Coldwater National Bank	434 (1899)	Fuller	none	none	Neb.	dismissed
Keck v. United States	434 (1899)	White	none	Brown	E.D. Pa.	reversed
Chappell Chemical and Fertilizer Company v. Sulphur Mines Company I	465 (1899)	McKenna	none	none	Md.	dismissed
Chappell Chemical and Fertilizer Company v. Sulphur Mines Company II	472 (1899)	McKenna	none	none	Md.	dismissed
Chappell Chemical and Fertilizer Company v. Sulphur Mines Company III	474 (1899)	McKenna	none	none	Md.	affirmed
Columbia Water Power Company v. Columbia Electric Street Railway Light and Power Company	475 (1899)	Brown	none	none	S.C.	affirmed
Pittsburgh, Cincinnati, Chicago and St. Louis Railroad v. Long Island Loan and Trust Company	493 (1899)	Harlan	none	none	Ohio	affirmed
Fitts v. McGhee	516 (1899)	Harlan	none	none	C.C.N.D. Ala.	reversed
Washington Gas Light Company v. Lansden	534 (1899)	Peckham	none	none	D.C. Cir.	reversed
Orient Insurance Company v. Daggs	557 (1899)	McKenna	none	none	Mo.	affirmed
United States v. Harsha	567 (1899)	Gray	none	none	6th Cir.	certification
First National Bank v. Anderson	573 (1899)	Fuller	none	none	N.D.	affirmed
United States v. Duell	576 (1899)	Fuller	none	none	D.C. Cir.	affirmed
Northern Pacific Railroad Company v. Myers	589 (1899)	McKenna	none	none	9th Cir.	affirmed
Connecticut Mutual Life Insurance Company v. Spratley	602 (1899)	Peckham	none	none	Tenn.	affirmed
Hoeninghaus v. United States	622 (1899)	Shiras	none	none	2d Cir.	certification
Marshall v. Burtis	630 (1899)	McKenna	none	none	Sup. Ct. Terr. Ariz.	affirmed
McQuade v. City of Trenton	636 (1899)	Brown	none	none	N.J.	dismissed

== See also ==
- Certificate of division
