= City of Walla Walla v. Walla Walla Water Co. =

City of Walla Walla v. Walla Walla Water Company
- Supreme Court of the United States

Argued October 12–13, 1898 Decided November 14, 1898
- Full case name: City of Walla Walla, et al. v. Walla Walla Water Company
- Citations: 172 U.S. 1 (more) 19 S. Ct. 77; 43 L. Ed. 341

Court membership
- Chief Justice Melville Fuller Associate Justices John M. Harlan · Horace Gray; David J. Brewer · Henry B. Brown; George Shiras Jr. · Edward D. White; Rufus W. Peckham · Joseph McKenna

Case opinion
- Majority: Brown, joined by unanimous

City of Walla Walla v. Walla Walla Water Company, 172 U.S. 1 (1898), was a United States Supreme Court case in which the Walla Walla Water Company filed a bill to stop the City of Walla Walla from erecting waterworks, acquiring property to erect waterworks, or using city money to build waterworks.
