= List of United States Supreme Court cases, volume 181 =

Supreme Court of the United States
- Interactive map of Supreme Court of the United States
- 38°53′26″N 77°00′16″W
- Established: March 4, 1789; 236 years ago
- Location: Washington, D.C.
- Coordinates: 38°53′26″N 77°00′16″W
- Composition method: Presidential nomination with Senate confirmation
- Authorised by: Constitution of the United States, Art. III, § 1
- Judge term length: life tenure, subject to impeachment and removal
- Number of positions: 9 (by statute)
- Website: supremecourt.gov

This is a list of cases reported in volume 181 of United States Reports, decided by the Supreme Court of the United States in 1901.

== Justices of the Supreme Court at the time of volume 181 U.S. ==
The Supreme Court is established by Article III, Section 1 of the Constitution of the United States, which says: "The judicial Power of the United States, shall be vested in one supreme Court . . .". The size of the Court is not specified; the Constitution leaves it to Congress to set the number of justices. Under the Judiciary Act of 1789 Congress originally fixed the number of justices at six (one chief justice and five associate justices). Since 1789 Congress has varied the size of the Court from six to seven, nine, ten, and back to nine justices (always including one chief justice).

When the cases in volume 181 were decided the Court comprised the following nine members:

Portrait	Justice	Office	Home State	Succeeded	Date confirmed by the Senate (Vote)	Tenure on Supreme Court
	Melville Fuller	Chief Justice	Illinois	Morrison Waite	July 20, 1888 (41–20)	October 8, 1888 – July 4, 1910 (Died)
	John Marshall Harlan	Associate Justice	Kentucky	David Davis	November 29, 1877 (Acclamation)	December 10, 1877 – October 14, 1911 (Died)
	Horace Gray	Associate Justice	Massachusetts	Nathan Clifford	December 20, 1881 (51–5)	January 9, 1882 – September 15, 1902 (Died)
	David Josiah Brewer	Associate Justice	Kansas	Stanley Matthews	December 18, 1889 (53–11)	January 6, 1890 – March 28, 1910 (Died)
	Henry Billings Brown	Associate Justice	Michigan	Samuel Freeman Miller	December 29, 1890 (Acclamation)	January 5, 1891 – May 28, 1906 (Retired)
	George Shiras Jr.	Associate Justice	Pennsylvania	Joseph P. Bradley	July 26, 1892 (Acclamation)	October 10, 1892 – February 23, 1903 (Retired)
	Edward Douglass White	Associate Justice	Louisiana	Samuel Blatchford	February 19, 1894 (Acclamation)	March 12, 1894 – December 18, 1910 (Continued as chief justice)
	Rufus W. Peckham	Associate Justice	New York	Howell Edmunds Jackson	December 9, 1895 (Acclamation)	January 6, 1896 – October 24, 1909 (Died)
	Joseph McKenna	Associate Justice	California	Stephen Johnson Field	January 21, 1898 (Acclamation)	January 26, 1898 – January 5, 1925 (Retired)

== Citation style ==
Under the Judiciary Act of 1789 the federal court structure at the time comprised District Courts, which had general trial jurisdiction; Circuit Courts, which had mixed trial and appellate (from the US District Courts) jurisdiction; and the United States Supreme Court, which had appellate jurisdiction over the federal District and Circuit courts—and for certain issues over state courts. The Supreme Court also had limited original jurisdiction (i.e., in which cases could be filed directly with the Supreme Court without first having been heard by a lower federal or state court). There were one or more federal District Courts and/or Circuit Courts in each state, territory, or other geographical region.

The Judiciary Act of 1891 created the United States Courts of Appeals and reassigned the jurisdiction of most routine appeals from the district and circuit courts to these appellate courts. The Act created nine new courts that were originally known as the "United States Circuit Courts of Appeals." The new courts had jurisdiction over most appeals of lower court decisions. The Supreme Court could review either legal issues that a court of appeals certified or decisions of court of appeals by writ of certiorari.

Bluebook citation style is used for case names, citations, and jurisdictions.

- "# Cir." = United States Court of Appeals
  - e.g., "3d Cir." = United States Court of Appeals for the Third Circuit
- "C.C.D." = United States Circuit Court for the District of . . .
  - e.g.,"C.C.D.N.J." = United States Circuit Court for the District of New Jersey
- "D." = United States District Court for the District of . . .
  - e.g.,"D. Mass." = United States District Court for the District of Massachusetts
- "E." = Eastern; "M." = Middle; "N." = Northern; "S." = Southern; "W." = Western
  - e.g.,"C.C.S.D.N.Y." = United States Circuit Court for the Southern District of New York
  - e.g.,"M.D. Ala." = United States District Court for the Middle District of Alabama
- "Ct. Cl." = United States Court of Claims
- The abbreviation of a state's name alone indicates the highest appellate court in that state's judiciary at the time.
  - e.g.,"Pa." = Supreme Court of Pennsylvania
  - e.g.,"Me." = Supreme Judicial Court of Maine

== List of cases in volume 181 U.S. ==
Case Name	Page and year	Opinion of the Court	Concurring opinion(s)	Dissenting opinion(s)	Lower Court	Disposition
East Tennessee, Virginia and Georgia Railway Company v. Interstate Commerce Commission	1 (1901)	White	none	none	6th Cir.	reversed
Interstate Commerce Commission v. Clyde Steamship Company	29 (1901)	White	none	none	5th Cir.	affirmed
Lombard v. West Chicago Park Commissioners	33 (1901)	White	none	none	Ill.	affirmed
Daingerfield National Bank v. Ragland	45 (1901)	White	none	none	Tex. Civ. App.	affirmed
East Building and Loan Association v. Welling	47 (1901)	White	none	none	S.C.	dismissed
Knights of Pythias v. Beck	49 (1901)	Brewer	none	none	9th Cir.	affirmed
Texas Pacific Railroad Company v. Humble	57 (1901)	Fuller	none	none	8th Cir.	affirmed
Browne v. Chavez	68 (1901)	Fuller	none	none	Sup. Ct. Terr. N.M.	multiple
John Hancock Mutual Life Insurance Company v. Warren	73 (1901)	Fuller	none	none	Ohio	affirmed
Whitney v. Hay	77 (1901)	Harlan	none	none	D.C. Cir.	affirmed
Western Union Telegraph Company v. Call Publishing Company	92 (1901)	Brewer	none	none	Neb.	affirmed
Whitney v. United States	104 (1901)	Peckham	none	none	Ct. Priv. Land Cl.	affirmed
Baker v. Cummings	117 (1901)	Peckham	none	none	D.C. Cir.	reversed
Werling v. Ingersoll	131 (1901)	Peckham	none	none	Ill.	affirmed
St. Paul Gas Light Company v. City of St. Paul	142 (1901)	White	none	none	Minn.	dismissed
Codlin v. Kohlhausen	151 (1901)	Fuller	none	none	Sup. Ct. Terr. N.M.	dismissed
City of New Orleans v. Emsheimer	153 (1901)	Fuller	none	none	C.C.E.D. La.	dismissed
Atherton v. Atherton	155 (1901)	Gray	none	Peckham	N.Y. Sup. Ct.	reversed
Bell v. Bell	175 (1901)	Gray	none	Peckham	N.Y. Sup. Ct.	affirmed nunc pro tunc
Streitwolf v. Streitwolf	179 (1901)	Gray	none	none	N.J.	affirmed
Lynde v. Lynde	183 (1901)	Gray	none	Peckham	N.Y. Sup. Ct.	affirmed
Bryan v. Bernheimer	188 (1901)	Gray	none	none	5th Cir.	reversed
Rasmussen v. Idaho	198 (1901)	Brewer	none	none	Idaho	affirmed
Scott v. Deweese	202 (1901)	Harlan	none	none	8th Cir.	affirmed
International Navigation Company v. Farr Bailey Manufacturing Company	218 (1901)	Fuller	none	none	3d Cir.	affirmed
Bedford v. Eastern Building and Loan Association	227 (1901)	McKenna	none	none	6th Cir.	affirmed
Wall v. Cox	244 (1901)	Gray	none	none	4th Cir.	certification
Smith v. St. Louis Southwestern Railway Company	248 (1901)	McKenna	none	Harlan; Brown	Tex. Civ. App.	affirmed
Treat v. White	264 (1901)	Brewer	none	none	2d Cir.	certification
Speed v. McCarthy	269 (1901)	Fuller	none	none	S.D. Cir.	dismissed
American Sugar Refining Company v. City of New Orleans	277 (1901)	Fuller	none	none	5th Cir.	reversed
Fairbank v. United States	283 (1901)	Brewer	none	Harlan	D. Minn.	reversed
French v. Barber Asphalt Paving Company	324 (1901)	Shiras	none	Harlan	Mo.	affirmed
Wight v. Davidson	371 (1901)	Shiras	none	Harlan	D.C. Cir.	reversed
Town of Tonawanda v. Lyon	389 (1901)	Shiras	none	Harlan	C.C.N.D.N.Y.	reversed
Webster v. City of Fargo	394 (1901)	Shiras	none	Harlan	N.D.	affirmed
Cass Farm Company v. City of Detroit	396 (1901)	Shiras	none	Harlan	Mich.	affirmed
City of Detroit v. Parker	399 (1901)	Shiras	none	Harlan	C.C.E.D. Mich.	reversed
Shumate v. Heman	402 (1901)	Shiras	none	Harlan	Mo.	affirmed
Farrell v. West Chicago Park Commissioners	404 (1901)	Shiras	none	Harlan	Ill.	affirmed
German National Bank v. Speckert	405 (1901)	Gray	none	none	6th Cir.	dismissed
Put-in-Bay Waterworks Railway Company v. Ryan	409 (1901)	Shiras	none	none	C.C.N.D. Ohio	certification
United States Rubber Company v. American Oak Leather Company	434 (1901)	Shiras	none	none	7th Cir.	reversed
District of Columbia v. Camden Iron Works	453 (1901)	Fuller	none	none	D.C. Cir.	affirmed
The Barnstable	464 (1901)	Brown	none	none	1st Cir.	reversed
Hale v. Lewis	473 (1901)	Brown	none	none	Wis.	dismissed
Barker v. Harvey	481 (1901)	Brewer	none	none	Cal.	affirmed
United States v. Edmonston	500 (1901)	Brewer	none	none	Ct. Cl.	reversed
Lockhart v. Johnson	516 (1901)	Peckham	none	none	Sup. Ct. Terr. N.M.	affirmed
Wells v. City of Savannah	531 (1901)	Peckham	none	none	Ga.	affirmed
Red River Valley National Bank v. Craig	548 (1901)	Peckham	none	none	N.D.	affirmed
Armijo v. Armijo	558 (1901)	Peckham	none	none	Sup. Ct. Terr. N.M.	affirmed
Marks v. Shoup	562 (1901)	McKenna	none	none	D. Alaska	reversed
Luhrs v. Hancock	567 (1901)	McKenna	none	none	Sup. Ct. Terr. Ariz.	affirmed
Audubon v. Shufeldt	575 (1901)	Gray	none	none	Sup. Ct. D.C.	reversed
Yazoo and Mississippi Valley Railroad Company v. Adams	580 (1901)	Brown	none	none	Miss.	rehearing denied
Schlitz Brewing Company v. United States	584 (1901)	Brown	none	none	Ct. Cl.	affirmed
Mallett v. North Carolina	589 (1901)	Shiras	none	none	N.C.	affirmed
Colburn v. Grant	601 (1901)	Shiras	none	none	D.C. Cir.	affirmed
American Sugar Refining Company v. United States	610 (1901)	McKenna	none	none	2d Cir.	affirmed

== See also ==
- Certificate of division
