= List of United States Supreme Court cases, volume 211 =

Supreme Court of the United States
- Interactive map of Supreme Court of the United States
- 38°53′26″N 77°00′16″W
- Established: March 4, 1789; 236 years ago
- Location: Washington, D.C.
- Coordinates: 38°53′26″N 77°00′16″W
- Composition method: Presidential nomination with Senate confirmation
- Authorised by: Constitution of the United States, Art. III, § 1
- Judge term length: life tenure, subject to impeachment and removal
- Number of positions: 9 (by statute)
- Website: supremecourt.gov

This is a list of cases reported in volume 211 of United States Reports, decided by the Supreme Court of the United States in 1908 and 1909.

== Justices of the Supreme Court at the time of volume 211 U.S. ==
The Supreme Court is established by Article III, Section 1 of the Constitution of the United States, which says: "The judicial Power of the United States, shall be vested in one supreme Court . . .". The size of the Court is not specified; the Constitution leaves it to Congress to set the number of justices. Under the Judiciary Act of 1789 Congress originally fixed the number of justices at six (one chief justice and five associate justices). Since 1789 Congress has varied the size of the Court from six to seven, nine, ten, and back to nine justices (always including one chief justice).

When the cases in volume 211 were decided the Court comprised the following nine members:

Portrait	Justice	Office	Home State	Succeeded	Date confirmed by the Senate (Vote)	Tenure on Supreme Court
	Melville Fuller	Chief Justice	Illinois	Morrison Waite	July 20, 1888 (41–20)	October 8, 1888 – July 4, 1910 (Died)
	John Marshall Harlan	Associate Justice	Kentucky	David Davis	November 29, 1877 (Acclamation)	December 10, 1877 – October 14, 1911 (Died)
	David Josiah Brewer	Associate Justice	Kansas	Stanley Matthews	December 18, 1889 (53–11)	January 6, 1890 – March 28, 1910 (Died)
	Edward Douglass White	Associate Justice	Louisiana	Samuel Blatchford	February 19, 1894 (Acclamation)	March 12, 1894 – December 18, 1910 (Continued as chief justice)
	Rufus W. Peckham	Associate Justice	New York	Howell Edmunds Jackson	December 9, 1895 (Acclamation)	January 6, 1896 – October 24, 1909 (Died)
	Joseph McKenna	Associate Justice	California	Stephen Johnson Field	January 21, 1898 (Acclamation)	January 26, 1898 – January 5, 1925 (Retired)
	Oliver Wendell Holmes Jr.	Associate Justice	Massachusetts	Horace Gray	December 4, 1902 (Acclamation)	December 8, 1902 – January 12, 1932 (Retired)
	William R. Day	Associate Justice	Ohio	George Shiras Jr.	February 23, 1903 (Acclamation)	March 2, 1903 – November 13, 1922 (Retired)
	William Henry Moody	Associate Justice	Massachusetts	Henry Billings Brown	December 12, 1906 (Acclamation)	December 17, 1906 – November 20, 1910 (Retired)

== Notable cases in 211 U.S. ==
=== Berea College v. Kentucky ===
Berea College v. Kentucky, 211 U.S. 45 (1908), is a significant case in which the Supreme Court upheld the right of states to prohibit private educational institutions chartered as corporations from admitting both black and white students. As in the related Plessy v. Ferguson decision, it was marked by a strongly worded dissent by John Marshall Harlan. The ruling also is a minor landmark on the nature of corporate personhood.

=== Twining v. New Jersey ===
In Twining v. New Jersey, 211 U.S. 78 (1908), the Supreme Court established the Incorporation Doctrine by concluding that, while certain rights enumerated in the federal Bill of Rights might apply to the states under the Fourteenth Amendment's Due Process Clause, the Fifth Amendment's right against self-incrimination was not incorporated. Twining was overturned in Malloy v. Hogan (1964), in which the Court finally incorporated the right against self-incrimination.

== Citation style ==
Under the Judiciary Act of 1789 the federal court structure at the time comprised District Courts, which had general trial jurisdiction; Circuit Courts, which had mixed trial and appellate (from the US District Courts) jurisdiction; and the United States Supreme Court, which had appellate jurisdiction over the federal District and Circuit courts—and for certain issues over state courts. The Supreme Court also had limited original jurisdiction (i.e., in which cases could be filed directly with the Supreme Court without first having been heard by a lower federal or state court). There were one or more federal District Courts and/or Circuit Courts in each state, territory, or other geographical region.

The Judiciary Act of 1891 created the United States Courts of Appeals and reassigned the jurisdiction of most routine appeals from the district and circuit courts to these appellate courts. The Act created nine new courts that were originally known as the "United States Circuit Courts of Appeals." The new courts had jurisdiction over most appeals of lower court decisions. The Supreme Court could review either legal issues that a court of appeals certified or decisions of court of appeals by writ of certiorari.

Bluebook citation style is used for case names, citations, and jurisdictions.

- "# Cir." = United States Court of Appeals
  - e.g., "3d Cir." = United States Court of Appeals for the Third Circuit
- "C.C.D." = United States Circuit Court for the District of . . .
  - e.g.,"C.C.D.N.J." = United States Circuit Court for the District of New Jersey
- "D." = United States District Court for the District of . . .
  - e.g.,"D. Mass." = United States District Court for the District of Massachusetts
- "E." = Eastern; "M." = Middle; "N." = Northern; "S." = Southern; "W." = Western
  - e.g.,"C.C.S.D.N.Y." = United States Circuit Court for the Southern District of New York
  - e.g.,"M.D. Ala." = United States District Court for the Middle District of Alabama
- "Ct. Cl." = United States Court of Claims
- The abbreviation of a state's name alone indicates the highest appellate court in that state's judiciary at the time.
  - e.g.,"Pa." = Supreme Court of Pennsylvania
  - e.g.,"Me." = Supreme Judicial Court of Maine

== List of cases in volume 211 U.S. ==
Case Name	Page and year	Opinion of the Court	Concurring opinion(s)	Dissenting opinion(s)	Lower Court	Disposition
Frasch v. Moore	1 (1908)	Fuller	none	none	D.C. Cir.	dismissed
Brandon v. Ard	11 (1908)	Harlan	none	none	Kan.	affirmed
Steele v. Culver	26 (1908)	Holmes	none	none	C.C.W.D. Mich.	dismissed
New York ex rel. Silz v. Hesterberg	31 (1908)	Day	none	none	N.Y. Sup. Ct.	affirmed
Berea College v. Kentucky	45 (1908)	Brewer	none	Harlan	Ky.	affirmed
Louisiana v. Garfield	70 (1908)	Holmes	none	none	original	dismissed
Twining v. New Jersey	78 (1908)	Moody	none	Harlan	N.J.	affirmed
Washington v. Oregon	127 (1908)	Brewer	none	none	original	boundary set
Honolulu R.T. and L. Company v. Wilder I	137 (1908)	Holmes	none	none	Sup. Ct. Terr. Haw.	affirmed
Honolulu R.T. and L. Company v. Wilder II	144 (1908)	Holmes	none	none	Sup. Ct. Terr. Haw.	dismissed
Kaizo v. Henry	146 (1908)	Moody	none	none	Sup. Ct. Terr. Haw.	affirmed
Louisville and Nashville Railroad Company v. Mottley	149 (1908)	Moody	none	none	C.C.W.D. Ky.	reversed
American Sugar Refining Company v. United States	155 (1908)	Fuller	none	none	C.C.S.D.N.Y.	dismissed
Cotton v. Hawaii	162 (1908)	White	none	none	Sup. Ct. Terr. Haw.	dismissed
Bowers Hydraulic Dredging Company v. United States	176 (1908)	White	none	none	Ct. Cl.	affirmed
Phoenix Bridge Company v. United States	188 (1908)	White	none	none	Ct. Cl.	affirmed
Pickford v. Talbott	199 (1908)	McKenna	none	none	D.C. Cir.	affirmed
Prentis v. Atlantic Coast Line Railroad Company	210 (1908)	Holmes	Fuller, Harlan	none	C.C.E.D. Va.	reversed
Wilder v. Inter-Island Steam Navigation Company	239 (1908)	Day	none	none	Sup. Ct. Terr. Haw.	affirmed
Garfield v. United States ex rel. Goldsby	249 (1908)	Day	none	none	D.C. Cir.	affirmed
Garfield v. United States ex rel. Allison	264 (1908)	Day	none	none	D.C. Cir.	affirmed
Home Telephone and Telegraph Company v. City of Los Angeles	265 (1908)	Moody	none	none	C.C.S.D. Cal.	affirmed
Honolulu Rapid Transit and Land Company v. Hawaii	282 (1908)	Moody	none	none	Sup. Ct. Terr. Haw.	reversed
Miller and Lux, Inc. v. East Side Canal and Irrigation Company	293 (1908)	Harlan	none	none	C.C.S.D. Cal.	affirmed
North American Cold Storage Company v. City of Chicago	306 (1908)	Peckham	none	none	C.C.N.D. Ill.	affirmed
Fitchie v. Brown	321 (1908)	Peckham	none	none	Sup. Ct. Terr. Haw.	affirmed
Ingersoll v. Coram	335 (1908)	McKenna	none	none	1st Cir.	affirmed
United States v. Keitel	370 (1908)	White	none	none	D. Colo.	reversed
United States v. Forrester	399 (1908)	White	none	none	D. Colo.	reversed
United States v. Herr I	404 (1908)	White	none	none	D. Colo.	reversed
United States v. Herr II	406 (1908)	White	none	none	D. Colo.	affirmed
Harriman v. Interstate Commerce Commission	407 (1908)	McKenna	none	none	Tex. Crim. App.	dismissed
Hutchins v. William W. Bierce, Ltd.	429 (1908)	Holmes	none	none	Sup. Ct. Terr. Haw.	dismissed
McCorquodale v. Texas	432 (1908)	McKenna	none	none	Tex. Crim. App.	dismissed
McCandless v. Pratt	437 (1908)	McKenna	none	none	Sup. Ct. Terr. Haw.	dismissed
Paddell v. City of New York	446 (1908)	Holmes	none	none	N.Y. Sup. Ct.	affirmed
Bailey v. Alabama	452 (1908)	Holmes	none	Harlan	Ala.	affirmed
Butler v. Frazee	459 (1908)	Moody	none	none	D.C. Cir.	affirmed
People ex rel. Kopel v. Bingham	468 (1909)	Fuller	none	none	N.Y. Sup. Ct.	affirmed
Beers v. Glynn	477 (1909)	Brewer	none	none	N.Y. Cnty. Sur. Ct.	affirmed
Knop v. Monongahela River Consolidated Coal and Coke Company	485 (1909)	Brewer	none	none	C.C.E.D. La.	dismissed
Lemieux v. Young	489 (1909)	White	none	none	Conn.	affirmed
Miller v. New Orleans Acid and Fertilizer Company	496 (1909)	White	none	none	La.	affirmed
United States v. Biggs	507 (1909)	White	none	none	D. Colo.	affirmed
United States v. Sullenberger	522 (1909)	White	none	none	D. Colo.	affirmed
United States v. Freeman	525 (1909)	White	none	none	D. Colo.	affirmed
Rusch v. John Duncan Land and Mining Company	526 (1909)	McKenna	none	none	Mich.	affirmed
Reid v. United States	529 (1909)	Holmes	none	none	S.D.N.Y.	dismissed
McLean v. Arkansas	539 (1909)	Day	none	none	Ark.	affirmed
Hardaway v. National Surety Company	552 (1909)	Day	none	none	6th Cir.	affirmed
Murphy v. John Hofman Company	562 (1909)	Moody	none	none	N.Y.	reversed
Page v. Rogers	575 (1909)	Moody	none	none	6th Cir.	reversed
Green County v. Quinlan	582 (1909)	Moody	none	Harlan	6th Cir.	affirmed
Green County v. Thomas' Executor	598 (1909)	Moody	none	none	6th Cir.	affirmed
Southern Realty Investment Company v. Walker	603 (1909)	Harlan	none	none	C.C.S.D. Ga.	affirmed
El Paso and Southwestern Railroad Company v. Vizard	608 (1909)	Brewer	none	none	5th Cir.	affirmed
Missouri Pacific Railroad Company v. Larabee Flour Mills Company	612 (1909)	Brewer	Holmes	Moody	Kan.	affirmed
Morgan v. Adams	627 (1909)	McKenna	none	none	D.C. Cir.	dismissed

== See also ==
- Certificate of division
