= Jurisdiction and Removal Act of 1875 =

The Jurisdiction and Removal Act of 1875 was an Act passed by the United States Congress in 1875, extending the jurisdiction of federal circuit courts as against that of the State courts.

== Provisions ==
The 1875 Act was the culmination of a series of acts that expanded the authority of the federal judiciary after the American Civil War. Headed "An Act to determine the jurisdiction of circuit courts of the United States, and to regulate the removal of causes from State courts, and for other purposes", it granted the U.S. circuit courts the jurisdiction to hear all cases arising under the United States Constitution and the laws of the United States, as long as the matter in dispute was worth more than $500. The statute also made it possible for plaintiffs and defendants in cases before state courts to remove a case to a U.S. circuit court whenever the matter involved a question of federal law or if any members of the parties were from different states. By establishing the full federal jurisdiction permitted by the Constitution, the act of 1875 fundamentally changed the role of the federal courts through the most sweeping extension of judicial power since the short-lived Judiciary Act of 1801.

== Background ==
Since 1789, federal jurisdiction had been divided between the federal courts and state courts, with the latter hearing most cases involving federal law if both parties were residents of the state. In the first half of the nineteenth century, Congress occasionally expanded the right of removal to federal courts in order to protect specific areas of federal authority such as enforcement of customs regulations during the War of 1812 and the collection of revenue following South Carolina’s attempt to nullify tariff laws. During and after the Civil War, Congress more frequently included removal provisions in acts designed to protect civil and political liberties in the former Confederate states, but the right of removal continued to be extended only in attempts to enforce specific policies.

By 1875, the members of Congress who supported full federal jurisdiction and a broad right of removal from the state courts were concerned less with the protection of freed slaves and white Unionists in the South than with the advancement of business interests that were often obstructed by state courts.

== Enactment ==
After the Supreme Court of the United States in 1874 overturned the removal provisions in two recent acts, Representative Luke Poland of Vermont introduced legislation to restore the right of removal in all civil cases in which one of the defendants was a citizen of a state other than that in which the suit was filed. Although the House rejected this modest extension of removal and passed a bill to make only minor revisions in the law, Senator Matthew Carpenter of Wisconsin proposed amendments to grant full federal jurisdiction to the United States circuit courts and guarantee the right of removal in any civil case arising under federal law or in which there was diversity of citizenship, with the $500 threshold applying to both categories of cases. The debate in Congress focused on the growing significance of interstate commerce and the economic benefits of a uniform system of justice.

The United States House of Representatives accepted that version of the bill, which President Ulysses S. Grant signed into law in March 1875.

== Consequences ==
Although this broad redefinition of federal jurisdiction prompted surprisingly little comment at the time, the act of 1875 attracted new types of litigation that swelled the caseload of the federal courts and challenged the existing organization of the judiciary.

== Sources ==
- History of the Federal Judiciary, Federal Judicial Center
