= List of United States Supreme Court cases, volume 205 =

Supreme Court of the United States
- Interactive map of Supreme Court of the United States
- 38°53′26″N 77°00′16″W
- Established: March 4, 1789; 236 years ago
- Location: Washington, D.C.
- Coordinates: 38°53′26″N 77°00′16″W
- Composition method: Presidential nomination with Senate confirmation
- Authorised by: Constitution of the United States, Art. III, § 1
- Judge term length: life tenure, subject to impeachment and removal
- Number of positions: 9 (by statute)
- Website: supremecourt.gov

This is a list of cases reported in volume 205 of United States Reports, decided by the Supreme Court of the United States in 1907.

== Justices of the Supreme Court at the time of volume 205 U.S. ==
The Supreme Court is established by Article III, Section 1 of the Constitution of the United States, which says: "The judicial Power of the United States, shall be vested in one supreme Court . . .". The size of the Court is not specified; the Constitution leaves it to Congress to set the number of justices. Under the Judiciary Act of 1789 Congress originally fixed the number of justices at six (one chief justice and five associate justices). Since 1789 Congress has varied the size of the Court from six to seven, nine, ten, and back to nine justices (always including one chief justice).

When the cases in volume 205 were decided the Court comprised the following nine members:

Portrait	Justice	Office	Home State	Succeeded	Date confirmed by the Senate (Vote)	Tenure on Supreme Court
	Melville Fuller	Chief Justice	Illinois	Morrison Waite	July 20, 1888 (41–20)	October 8, 1888 – July 4, 1910 (Died)
	John Marshall Harlan	Associate Justice	Kentucky	David Davis	November 29, 1877 (Acclamation)	December 10, 1877 – October 14, 1911 (Died)
	David Josiah Brewer	Associate Justice	Kansas	Stanley Matthews	December 18, 1889 (53–11)	January 6, 1890 – March 28, 1910 (Died)
	Edward Douglass White	Associate Justice	Louisiana	Samuel Blatchford	February 19, 1894 (Acclamation)	March 12, 1894 – December 18, 1910 (Continued as chief justice)
	Rufus W. Peckham	Associate Justice	New York	Howell Edmunds Jackson	December 9, 1895 (Acclamation)	January 6, 1896 – October 24, 1909 (Died)
	Joseph McKenna	Associate Justice	California	Stephen Johnson Field	January 21, 1898 (Acclamation)	January 26, 1898 – January 5, 1925 (Retired)
	Oliver Wendell Holmes Jr.	Associate Justice	Massachusetts	Horace Gray	December 4, 1902 (Acclamation)	December 8, 1902 – January 12, 1932 (Retired)
	William R. Day	Associate Justice	Ohio	George Shiras Jr.	February 23, 1903 (Acclamation)	March 2, 1903 – November 13, 1922 (Retired)
	William Henry Moody	Associate Justice	Massachusetts	Henry Billings Brown	December 12, 1906 (Acclamation)	December 17, 1906 – November 20, 1910 (Retired)

== Notable Case in 205 U.S. ==
=== Halter v. Nebraska ===
Halter v. Nebraska, 205 U.S. 34 (1907), was a Supreme Court decision involving a Nebraska statute that prevented and punished desecration of the flag of the United States, and prohibited the sale of articles upon which there is a representation of the flag for advertising purposes. The court held that the statute was not unconstitutional either as depriving the owner of such articles of his property without due process of law, or as denying him the equal protection of the laws because of the exception from the operation of the statute of newspapers, periodicals, or books upon which the flag may be represented if disconnected from any advertisement.

== Citation style ==
Under the Judiciary Act of 1789 the federal court structure at the time comprised District Courts, which had general trial jurisdiction; Circuit Courts, which had mixed trial and appellate (from the US District Courts) jurisdiction; and the United States Supreme Court, which had appellate jurisdiction over the federal District and Circuit courts—and for certain issues over state courts. The Supreme Court also had limited original jurisdiction (i.e., in which cases could be filed directly with the Supreme Court without first having been heard by a lower federal or state court). There were one or more federal District Courts and/or Circuit Courts in each state, territory, or other geographical region.

The Judiciary Act of 1891 created the United States Courts of Appeals and reassigned the jurisdiction of most routine appeals from the district and circuit courts to these appellate courts. The Act created nine new courts that were originally known as the "United States Circuit Courts of Appeals." The new courts had jurisdiction over most appeals of lower court decisions. The Supreme Court could review either legal issues that a court of appeals certified or decisions of court of appeals by writ of certiorari.

Bluebook citation style is used for case names, citations, and jurisdictions.

- "# Cir." = United States Court of Appeals
  - e.g., "3d Cir." = United States Court of Appeals for the Third Circuit
- "C.C.D." = United States Circuit Court for the District of . . .
  - e.g.,"C.C.D.N.J." = United States Circuit Court for the District of New Jersey
- "D." = United States District Court for the District of . . .
  - e.g.,"D. Mass." = United States District Court for the District of Massachusetts
- "E." = Eastern; "M." = Middle; "N." = Northern; "S." = Southern; "W." = Western
  - e.g.,"C.C.S.D.N.Y." = United States Circuit Court for the Southern District of New York
  - e.g.,"M.D. Ala." = United States District Court for the Middle District of Alabama
- "Ct. Cl." = United States Court of Claims
- The abbreviation of a state's name alone indicates the highest appellate court in that state's judiciary at the time.
  - e.g.,"Pa." = Supreme Court of Pennsylvania
  - e.g.,"Me." = Supreme Judicial Court of Maine

== List of cases in volume 205 U.S. ==
Case Name	Page and year	Opinion of the Court	Concurring opinion(s)	Dissenting opinion(s)	Lower Court	Disposition
Schlemmer v. Buffalo, Rochester and Pittsburgh Railway Company	1 (1907)	Holmes	none	Brewer	Pa.	reversed
Tinsley v. Treat	20 (1907)	Fuller	none	none	C.C.E.D. Va.	reversed
Kessler v. Treat	33 (1907)	Fuller	none	none	C.C.E.D. Va.	reversed
Halter v. Nebraska	34 (1907)	Harlan	none	none	Neb.	affirmed
Citizens' Savings and Trust Company v. Illinois Central Railroad Company	46 (1907)	Harlan	none	none	C.C.E.D. Ill.	reversed
Wilmington Star Mining Company v. Fulton	60 (1907)	White	none	none	C.C.N.D. Ill.	reversed
United States ex rel. West v. Hitchcock	80 (1907)	Holmes	none	none	D.C. Cir.	affirmed
Perovich v. United States	86 (1907)	Brewer	none	none	D. Alaska	affirmed
Delamater v. South Dakota	93 (1907)	White	none	none	S.D.	affirmed
United States v. Bethlehem Steel Company	105 (1907)	Peckham	none	none	Ct. Cl.	reversed
Northern Pacific Railroad Company v. Slaght I	122 (1907)	McKenna	none	none	Wash.	affirmed
Northern Pacific Railroad Company v. Slaght II	134 (1907)	McKenna	none	none	Wash.	affirmed
Martin v. District of Columbia	135 (1907)	Holmes	none	none	D.C. Cir.	reversed
Wetmore v. Karrick	141 (1907)	Day	none	none	D.C. Cir.	affirmed
United States v. Mitchell	161 (1907)	Fuller	none	none	Ct. Cl.	reversed
Tracy v. Ginzberg	170 (1907)	Harlan	none	none	Mass.	affirmed
Urquhart v. Brown	179 (1907)	Harlan	none	none	C.C.W.D. Wash.	reversed
Tindle v. Birkett	183 (1907)	Fuller	none	none	N.Y. Sup. Ct.	affirmed
Davidson Steamship Company v. United States	187 (1907)	Brewer	none	none	8th Cir.	affirmed
Love v. Flahive	195 (1907)	Brewer	none	none	Mont.	affirmed
Hiscock v. Mertens	202 (1907)	McKenna	none	none	2d Cir.	affirmed
Moore v. McGuire	214 (1907)	Holmes	none	none	C.C.E.D. Ark.	reversed
Empire State-Idaho Mining and Developing Company v. Hanley	225 (1907)	Day	none	none	C.C.D. Idaho	dismissed
Rochester Railroad Company v. City of Rochester	236 (1907)	Moody	none	none	N.Y. Sup. Ct.	affirmed
Pearcy v. Stranahan	257 (1907)	Fuller	White	none	C.C.S.D.N.Y.	affirmed
Swing v. Weston Lumber Company	275 (1907)	Fuller	none	none	Mich.	dismissed
Gila Bend Reservoir and Irrigation Company v. Gila Water Company	279 (1907)	Brewer	none	none	Sup. Ct. Terr. Ariz.	rehearing denied
Ballentyne v. Smith	285 (1907)	Brewer	none	none	Sup. Ct. Terr. Haw.	affirmed
Fields v. United States	292 (1907)	Brewer	none	none	D.C. Cir.	dismissed
Mercantile Trust Company v. Hensey	298 (1907)	Peckham	none	none	D.C. Cir.	affirmed
Johnson v. Browne	309 (1907)	Peckham	none	none	C.C.S.D.N.Y.	affirmed
Hunt v. New York Cotton Exchange	322 (1907)	McKenna	none	none	C.C.W.D. Tenn.	affirmed
W.W. Bierce, Ltd. v. Hutchins	340 (1907)	Holmes	none	none	Sup. Ct. Terr. Haw.	reversed
Kawananokoa v. Polyblank	349 (1907)	Holmes	none	none	Sup. Ct. Terr. Haw.	affirmed
The Winnebago	354 (1907)	Day	none	none	Mich.	affirmed
Peterson v. Chicago, Rock Island and Pacific Railroad Company	364 (1907)	Day	none	none	C.C.N.D. Tex.	affirmed
Metropolitan Life Insurance Company v. City of New Orleans	395 (1907)	Moody	none	none	La.	affirmed
Behn, Meyer and Company v. Campbell and Go Tauco	403 (1907)	Moody	none	none	Phil.	affirmed
Quinlan v. Green County	410 (1907)	Moody	none	none	6th Cir.	certification
Travers v. Reinhardt	423 (1907)	Harlan	none	Holmes	D.C. Cir.	affirmed
Chicago, Burlington and Quincy Railroad Company v. Williams	444 (1907)	Harlan	none	none	8th Cir.	dismissed
Patterson v. Colorado ex rel. Attorney General	454 (1907)	Holmes	none	Harlan, Brewer	Colo.	dismissed
Chanler v. Kelsey	466 (1907)	Day	none	Holmes	N.Y. County Sur. Ct.	affirmed
Barrington v. Missouri	483 (1907)	Fuller	none	none	Mo.	dismissed
Whitfield v. Aetna Life Insurance Company	489 (1907)	Harlan	none	none	8th Cir.	reversed
Harrison v. Magoon	501 (1907)	Holmes	none	none	Sup. Ct. Terr. Haw.	dismissed
Home Savings Bank v. City of Des Moines	503 (1907)	Moody	none	none	Iowa	reversed
Frank v. Vollkommer	521 (1907)	Fuller	none	none	N.Y. Sup. Ct.	affirmed
Green v. Chicago, Burlington and Quincy Railroad Company	530 (1907)	Moody	none	none	C.C.E.D. Pa..	affirmed

== See also ==
- Certificate of division
