= Andersen v. Treat =

- Supreme Court of the United States

Argued November 8, 1898 Decided November 14, 1898
- Full case name: John Andersen v. Treat
- Citations: 172 U.S. 24 (more) 19 S. Ct. 67; 43 L. Ed. 351; 1898 U.S. LEXIS 1638

Case history
- Prior: Appeal from the District Court of the United States for the Eastern District of Virginia

Court membership
- Chief Justice Melville Fuller Associate Justices John M. Harlan · Horace Gray; David J. Brewer · Henry B. Brown; George Shiras Jr. · Edward D. White; Rufus W. Peckham · Joseph McKenna

Case opinion
- Majority: Fuller, joined by unanimous

Andersen v. Treat, 172 U.S. 24 (1898), was a United States Supreme Court case in which John Andersen was convicted of the murder of William Wallace Sanders, who was his mate on the ship Olive Pecket. Andersen was found guilty and sentenced to death, but petitioned the District Court of the United States for the Eastern District of Virginia for a writ of habeas corpus, under the claim that he had been deprived of his right to counsel under the Sixth Amendment to the United States Constitution. Chief Justice Fuller delivered the opinion of the Court affirming the order of the lower court.

== See also ==
- List of United States Supreme Court cases, volume 172
