= Prayer for relief =

Part of a legal complaint

A prayer for relief, in the law of civil procedure, is a portion of a complaint in which the plaintiff describes the remedies that the plaintiff seeks from the court. For example, the plaintiff may ask for an award of compensatory damages, punitive damages, attorney's fees, an injunction to make the defendant stop a certain activity, or all of these. The request for a specific amount of money may be referred to as an ad damnum clause.
