= List of United States Supreme Court cases, volume 136 =

Supreme Court of the United States
- Interactive map of Supreme Court of the United States
- 38°53′26″N 77°00′16″W
- Established: March 4, 1789; 236 years ago
- Location: Washington, D.C.
- Coordinates: 38°53′26″N 77°00′16″W
- Composition method: Presidential nomination with Senate confirmation
- Authorised by: Constitution of the United States, Art. III, § 1
- Judge term length: life tenure, subject to impeachment and removal
- Number of positions: 9 (by statute)
- Website: supremecourt.gov

This is a list of cases reported in volume 136 of United States Reports, decided by the Supreme Court of the United States in 1890.

== Justices of the Supreme Court at the time of volume 136 U.S. ==
The Supreme Court is established by Article III, Section 1 of the Constitution of the United States, which says: "The judicial Power of the United States, shall be vested in one supreme Court . . .". The size of the Court is not specified; the Constitution leaves it to Congress to set the number of justices. Under the Judiciary Act of 1789 Congress originally fixed the number of justices at six (one chief justice and five associate justices). Since 1789 Congress has varied the size of the Court from six to seven, nine, ten, and back to nine justices (always including one chief justice).

When the cases in volume 136 U.S. were decided the Court comprised the following nine members:

Portrait	Justice	Office	Home State	Succeeded	Date confirmed by the Senate (Vote)	Tenure on Supreme Court
	Melville Fuller	Chief Justice	Illinois	Morrison Waite	July 20, 1888 (41–20)	October 8, 1888 – July 4, 1910 (Died)
	Samuel Freeman Miller	Associate Justice	Iowa	Peter Vivian Daniel	July 16, 1862 (Acclamation)	July 21, 1862 – October 13, 1890 (Died)
	Stephen Johnson Field	Associate Justice	California	newly created seat	March 10, 1863 (Acclamation)	May 10, 1863 – December 1, 1897 (Retired)
	Joseph P. Bradley	Associate Justice	New Jersey	newly created seat	March 21, 1870 (46–9)	March 23, 1870 – January 22, 1892 (Died)
	John Marshall Harlan	Associate Justice	Kentucky	David Davis	November 29, 1877 (Acclamation)	December 10, 1877 – October 14, 1911 (Died)
	Horace Gray	Associate Justice	Massachusetts	Nathan Clifford	December 20, 1881 (51–5)	January 9, 1882 – September 15, 1902 (Died)
	Samuel Blatchford	Associate Justice	New York	Ward Hunt	March 22, 1882 (Acclamation)	April 3, 1882 – July 7, 1893 (Died)
	Lucius Quintus Cincinnatus Lamar	Associate Justice	Mississippi	William Burnham Woods	January 16, 1888 (32–28)	January 18, 1888 – January 23, 1893 (Died)
	David Josiah Brewer	Associate Justice	Kansas	Stanley Matthews	December 18, 1889 (53–11)	January 6, 1890 – March 28, 1910 (Died)

== Citation style ==
Under the Judiciary Act of 1789 the federal court structure at the time comprised District Courts, which had general trial jurisdiction; Circuit Courts, which had mixed trial and appellate (from the US District Courts) jurisdiction; and the United States Supreme Court, which had appellate jurisdiction over the federal District and Circuit courts—and for certain issues over state courts. The Supreme Court also had limited original jurisdiction (i.e., in which cases could be filed directly with the Supreme Court without first having been heard by a lower federal or state court). There were one or more federal District Courts and/or Circuit Courts in each state, territory, or other geographical region.

Bluebook citation style is used for case names, citations, and jurisdictions.

- "C.C.D." = United States Circuit Court for the District of . . .
  - e.g.,"C.C.D.N.J." = United States Circuit Court for the District of New Jersey
- "D." = United States District Court for the District of . . .
  - e.g.,"D. Mass." = United States District Court for the District of Massachusetts
- "E." = Eastern; "M." = Middle; "N." = Northern; "S." = Southern; "W." = Western
  - e.g.,"C.C.S.D.N.Y." = United States Circuit Court for the Southern District of New York
  - e.g.,"M.D. Ala." = United States District Court for the Middle District of Alabama
- "Ct. Cl." = United States Court of Claims
- The abbreviation of a state's name alone indicates the highest appellate court in that state's judiciary at the time.
  - e.g.,"Pa." = Supreme Court of Pennsylvania
  - e.g.,"Me." = Supreme Judicial Court of Maine

== List of cases in volume 136 U.S. ==
Case Name	Page & year	Opinion of the Court	Concurring opinion(s)	Dissenting opinion(s)	Lower Court	Disposition
LDS Church v. United States	1 (1890)	Bradley	none	Fuller	Dist. Ct. Terr. Utah	continued
Ryan v. United States	68 (1890)	Harlan	none	none	C.C.W.D. Mich.	affirmed
Kneeland v. American L. & T. Co.	89 (1890)	Brewer	none	none	C.C.D. Ind.	reversed
McCall v. California	104 (1890)	Lamar	none	none	Cal. Super. Ct.	reversed
Norfolk & W.R.R. Co. v. Pennsylvania	114 (1890)	Lamar	none	none	Pa.	reversed
Hot Springs R.R. Co. v. Williamson	121 (1890)	Lamar	none	none	Ark.	affirmed
Lovell v. Cragin	130 (1890)	Lamar	none	none	C.C.E.D. La.	multiple
Cornell Univ. v. Fiske	152 (1890)	Blatchford	none	Brewer	N.Y. Sup. Ct.	affirmed
United States v. North Carolina	211 (1890)	Gray	none	Miller	original	judgment for N.C.
Union Nat'l Bank v. Bank of Kansas City	223 (1890)	Gray	none	none	C.C.W.D. Mo.	affirmed
Smith M.P. Co. v. McGroarty	237 (1890)	Gray	none	none	C.C.S.D. Ohio	reversed
Hamilton v. Liverpool et al. Co.	242 (1890)	Gray	none	none	C.C.S.D. Ohio	affirmed
In re Palliser	257 (1890)	Gray	none	none	C.C.S.D.N.Y.	affirmed
Chicago Ry. E. Co v. Merchants' Nat'l Bank	268 (1890)	Harlan	none	none	C.C.W.D. Wis.	affirmed
Thompson v. Phenix Ins. Co.	287 (1890)	Harlan	none	none	C.C.D. Or.	reversed
Allen v. Hanks	300 (1890)	Harlan	none	none	E.D. Ark.	affirmed
Minnesota v. Barber	313 (1890)	Harlan	none	none	C.C.D. Minn.	affirmed
In re Oteiza y Cortez	330 (1890)	Blatchford	none	none	C.C.S.D.N.Y.	affirmed
Saloy v. Bloch	338 (1890)	Bradley	none	none	C.C.E.D. La.	reversed
Reynolds v. Adden	348 (1890)	Bradley	none	none	C.C.E.D. La.	affirmed
Nashua & L.R.R. Corp. v. Boston & L.R.R. Corp.	356 (1890)	Field	none	none	C.C.D. Mass.	reversed
Norris v. Haggin	386 (1890)	Miller	none	none	C.C.D. Cal.	affirmed
Texas & P. Ry. Co. v. City of Marshall	393 (1890)	Miller	none	none	C.C.E.D. Tex.	reversed
Richelieu et al. Co. v. Boston M. Ins. Co.	408 (1890)	Fuller	none	none	C.C.E.D. Mich.	affirmed
In re Kemmler	436 (1890)	Fuller	none	none	N.Y.	dismissed
District of Columbia v. Woodbury	450 (1890)	Harlan	none	none	Sup. Ct. D.C.	affirmed
Stevens v. Fuller	468 (1890)	Blatchford	none	none	C.C.D. Mass.	affirmed
Indiana v. Kentucky	479 (1890)	Field	none	none	original	judgment for Ky.
Thaw v. Ritchie	519 (1890)	Gray	none	none	Sup. Ct. D.C.	affirmed
Gibbons v. Mahon	549 (1890)	Gray	none	none	Sup. Ct. D.C.	affirmed
Sherman v. Robertson	570 (1890)	per curiam	none	none	C.C.S.D.N.Y.	reversed
Inland & S.C. Co. v. Tolson	572 (1890)	per curiam	none	none	Sup. Ct. D.C.	dismissal rescinded
Irwin v. San Francisco S.U.	578 (1890)	per curiam	none	none	C.C.N.D. Cal.	affirmed
Davenport v. Paris	580 (1890)	per curiam	none	none	C.C.S.D. Ill.	affirmed
Mason v. United States	581 (1890)	per curiam	none	none	C.C.N.D. Ill.	dismissed
In re Burrus	586 (1890)	Miller	none	none	D. Neb.	prisoner discharged
Federal courts do not have jurisdiction to hear child custody cases.
