= Gonzalo de Quesada y Aróstegui =

Cuban writer and diplomat (1868–1915)

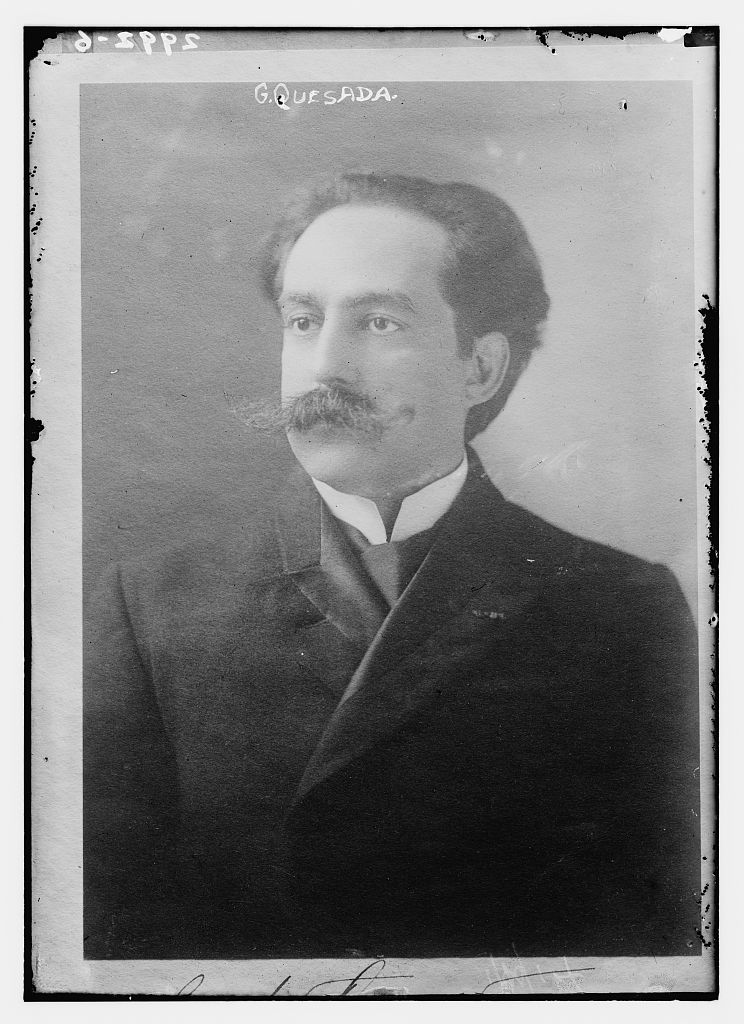

Gonzalo de Quesada (December 15, 1868 – January 9, 1915) was a key architect of Cuba's Independence Movement with José Martí during the late 19th century. He received the National Order of the Legion of Honour of France.

== Biography ==
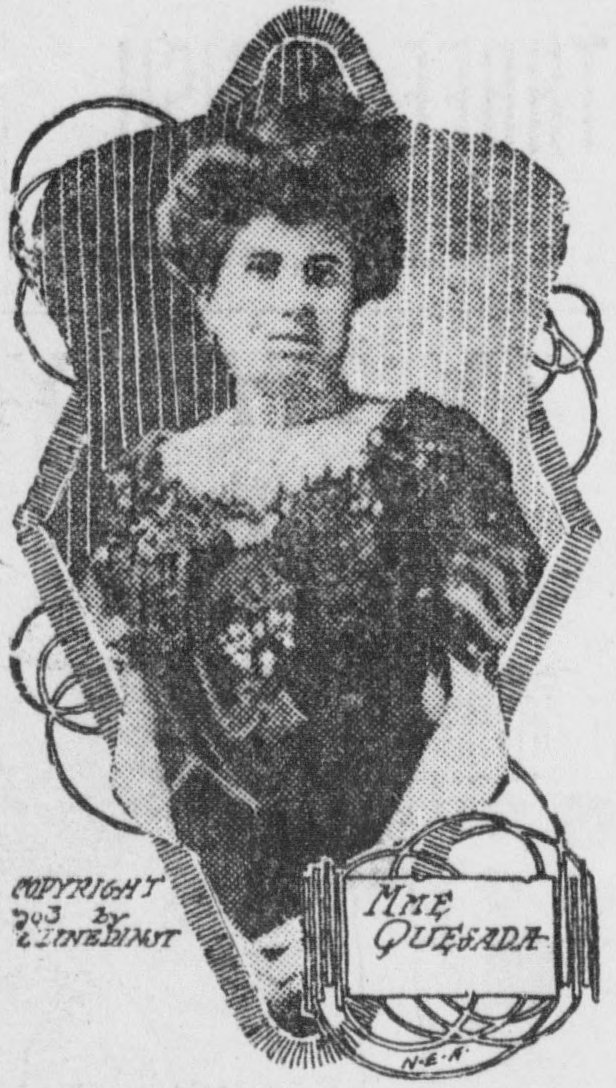
Angelina Miranda Quesada, his wife

He was born in Havana on December 15, 1868. His family moved to New York City, where he was educated. While in the United States, he attended City College of New York before graduating from Columbia University. During his undergraduate career he was initiated into Theta Delta Chi. He soon pursued a law degree, graduating from New York University in 1891.

While in New York, de Quesada came in contact with Martí after attending several rallies for Cuban exiles.

In 1900 he became Special Commissioner of Cuba to the United States. During 1901 he was a member of the Cuban Constitutional Convention. Entering the diplomatic service, he became minister to the United States and, from 1912, to Germany.

In 1903, he was able to convince the American government that the Isle of Pines had been part of the Cuban territory since 1511, and on March 2, 1904, he signed the Hay-Quesada Treaty. It was not ratified by the US at that time.

He died on January 9, 1915, in Berlin.

== Publications ==
He authored many books, among them A History of Free Cuba (1898) and Cuba (1905). He also edited Marti's Obras literarias (1900–11).
