= Rufus W. Peckham =

US Supreme Court justice from 1896 to 1909

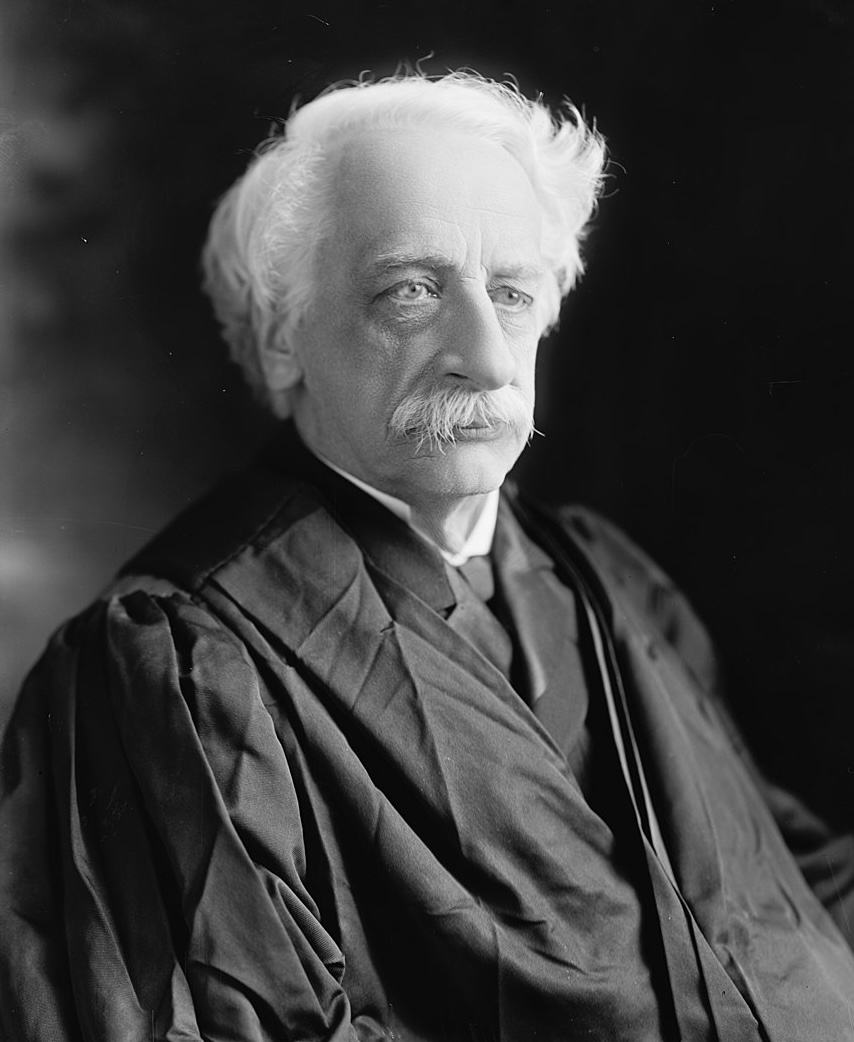
- Peckham, 1905–1909

Associate Justice of the Supreme Court of the United States
- In office January 6, 1896 – October 24, 1909
- Nominated by: Grover Cleveland
- Preceded by: Howell E. Jackson
- Succeeded by: Horace Harmon Lurton

Personal details
- Born: November 8, 1838 Albany, New York, U.S.
- Died: October 24, 1909 (aged 70) Altamont, New York, U.S.
- Party: Democratic
- Spouse: Hariette Arnold (m. 1867)
- Children: 2

Rufus Wheeler Peckham (Note: Modern sources, including supremecourt.gov, list his middle name as "Wheeler", like his father; however, sources that were published in his lifetime mostly listed it as William.) (November 8, 1838 – October 24, 1909) was an American lawyer and jurist who served as an Associate Justice of the U.S. Supreme Court from 1896 to 1909, and is the most recent Democratic nominee approved by a Republican-majority Senate. He was known for his strong use of substantive due process to invalidate regulations of business and property. Peckham's namesake father was also a lawyer and judge, and a U.S. Representative. His older brother, Wheeler Hazard Peckham (1833–1905), was one of the lawyers who prosecuted William M. Tweed and a failed nominee to the Supreme Court.

== Biography ==
Peckham was born in Albany, New York, to Rufus Wheeler Peckham and Isabella Adeline Lacey; his mother died when he was only nine. Following his graduation from The Albany Academy, he followed in his father's footsteps as a lawyer, being admitted to the bar in Albany in 1859 after teaching himself law by studying in his father's office. After a decade of private practice, Peckham served as the Albany district attorney from 1869 to 1872. Peckham then returned to private legal practice and served as counsel to the City of Albany, until being elected as a trial judge on the New York Supreme Court in 1883. In 1886, Peckham was elected to the New York Court of Appeals, the highest court in the state. While sitting as an associate judge on the Court of Appeals, Peckham also served as a member of the Albany Law School Board of Trustees. His appointment to the New York Court of Appeals was the third position that Peckham had held after his father, who had also served as the Albany D.A., on the New York Supreme Court, and finally on the Court of Appeals until his death in the 1873 Ville du Havre sinking.

Peckham was active in local Democratic politics, and served as a New York delegate to the 1876 Democratic National Convention. He was also a confidant to such tycoons as J. Pierpont Morgan, Cornelius Vanderbilt, and John D. Rockefeller. Many believed these relationships predisposed Peckham to favor business interests while on the Supreme Court.

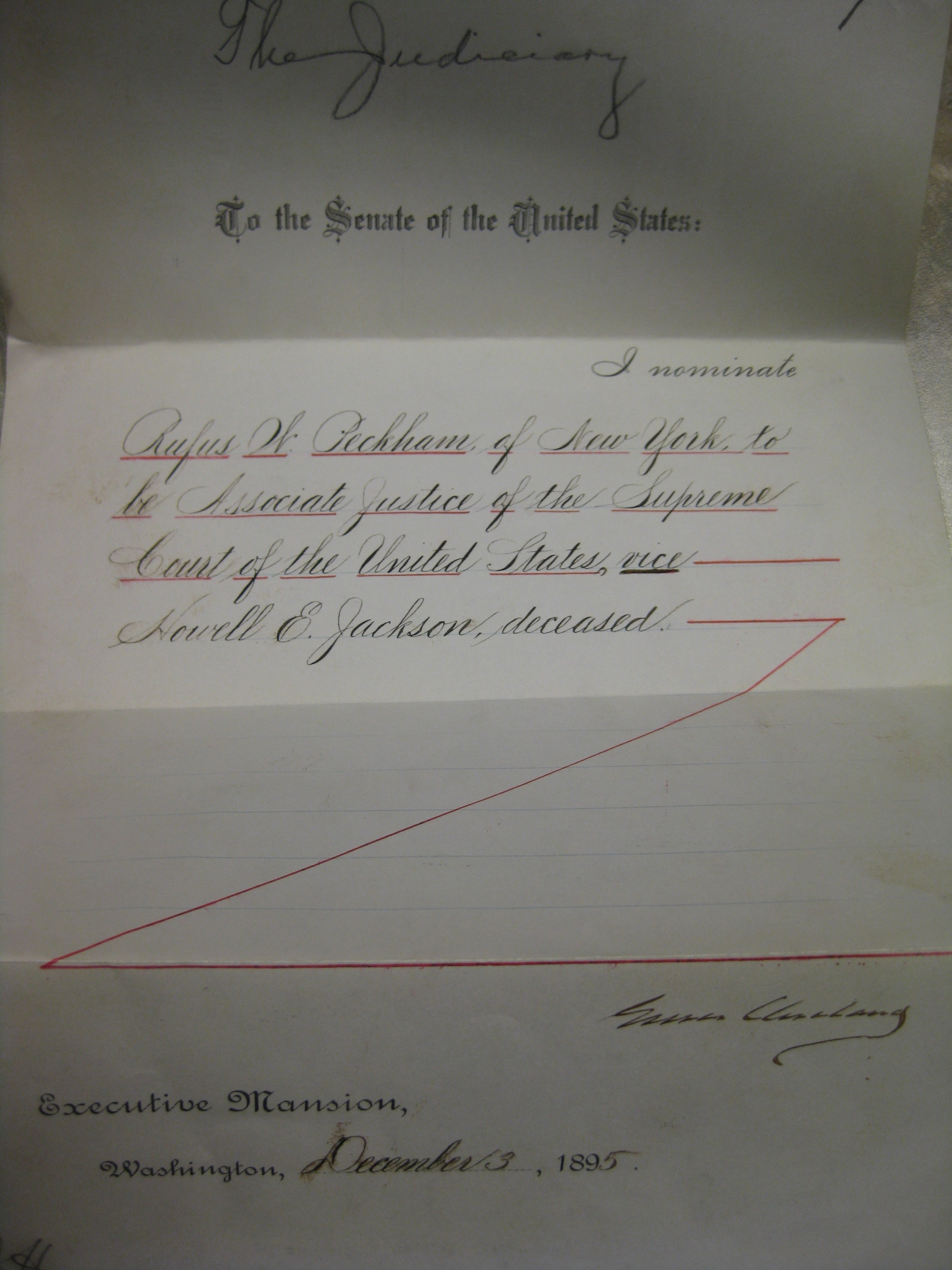
Peckham's Supreme Court nomination

Rufus Peckham's brother Wheeler was a nominee to the U.S. Supreme Court by President Grover Cleveland, in 1894. However, this nomination was caught in the middle of a political tug-of-war between Cleveland and New York Senator David Hill, and Wheeler was the second nominee of Cleveland's that Hill managed to block; Senator Edward Douglass White was instead confirmed to the Court. By the time another seat on the Court was vacant after the death of Howell Edmunds Jackson in 1895, Hill was weakened politically and Cleveland turned to Rufus Peckham, who was confirmed within six days on December of that year (by a Republican-controlled Senate). He was sworn into office on January 6, 1896. Peckham remains the last Supreme Court Justice seated by a Democratic president when the Senate had a Republican majority.

Peckham's stint on the Court has been called by many scholars the height of laissez-faire constitutionalism, during which the Court regularly struck down efforts to regulate labor standards and relations. Peckham's most famous opinion was his majority opinion in Lochner v. New York (1905), in which the Court invalidated a limitation on bakers' working hours to sixty per week as being contrary to the individual right to freely contract, and as being unnecessary to protect health or safety. In the same opinion, Peckham upheld other workplace regulations relating to baker's facilities that he did believe justified limitations on the freedom of contract.

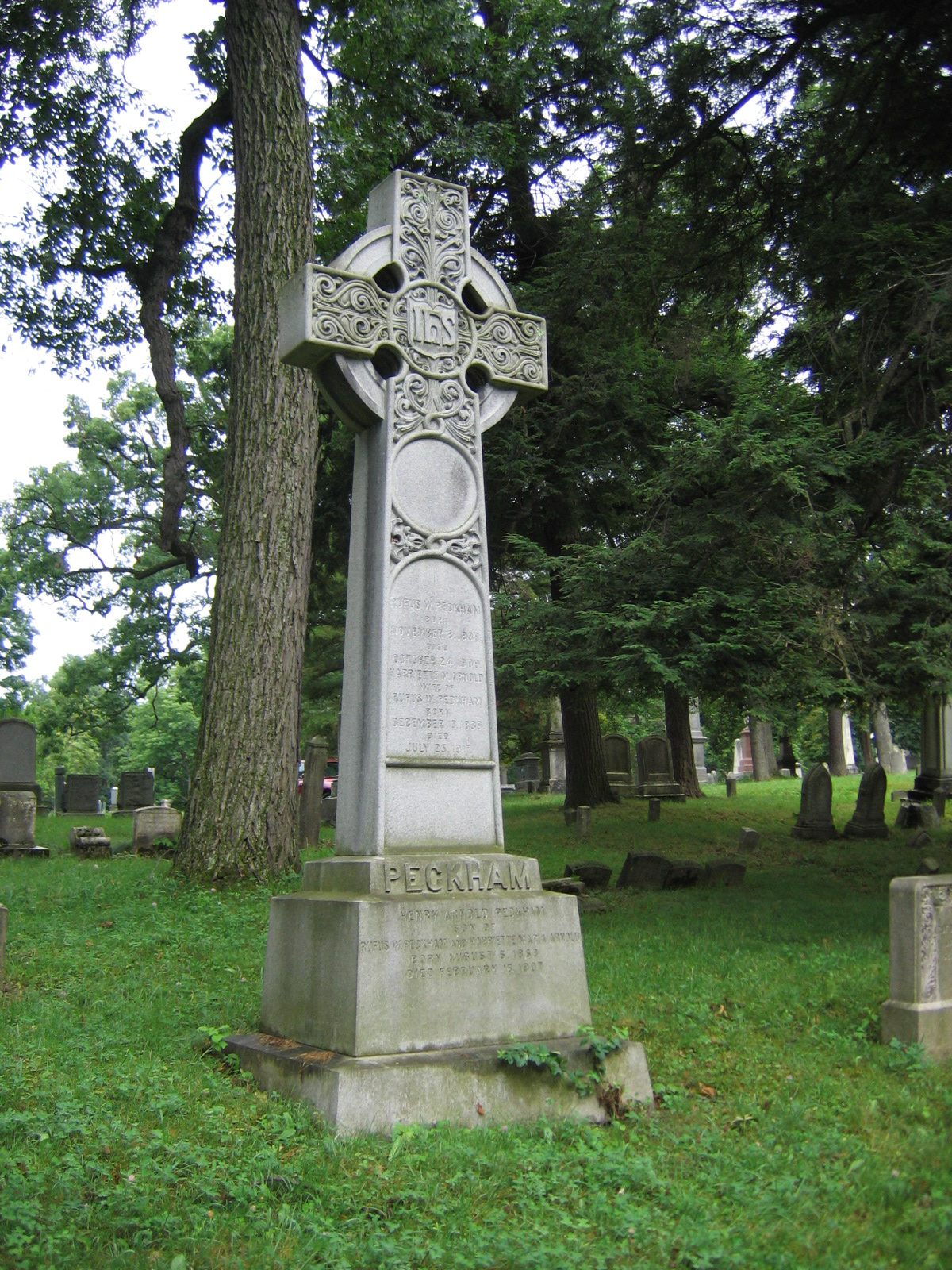
Peckham's grave at Albany Rural Cemetery

Beyond Lochner, Peckham is best known for expansively interpreting the Sherman Antitrust Act as prohibiting all restraints of trade, rather than only those already blocked under existing common law. His opinions on civil rights for African Americans are remarkable only for the abandonment of his usual anti-statism in voting to uphold Jim Crow laws–– the most notable being Plessy v. Ferguson (1896), in which he silently joined the majority. On the other hand, he and Justice David Josiah Brewer were far more likely than any of their colleagues to vote in favor of Chinese litigants in the many immigration cases that came before the Court.

Justice Peckham authored the landmark decision in Ex parte Young (1908), which held that a federal court may issue an injunction against a State officer to prevent the enforcement of an invalid State law.

Peckham served on the Court until his death from cardiovascular disease on October 24, 1909, at age 70, writing 303 opinions and dissenting only nine times. His death came during what biographer Willard King calls "[p]erhaps the worst year in the history of the Court" – the term from October 1909 to May 1910 – when two justices died, the other being David J. Brewer, and another justice, William Henry Moody, became fully incapacitated, while Chief Justice Melville Fuller's health declined.

== Family and burial ==
He was buried in Albany Rural Cemetery in Menands, New York, later to be joined by his wife, Harriette Maria Arnold (December 13, 1839 - July 25, 1917). They outlived both of their sons: Henry Arnold (August 6, 1868 – February 16, 1907) and Rufus W. Jr. (January 28, 1870 – September 16, 1899). Mrs. Peckham was also the paternal aunt of heiress Dorothy Arnold, whose disappearance on December 12, 1910 was referenced, in 1928, as "the great search of the age" by United Press Associations (now UPI).

== See also ==
- List of justices of the Supreme Court of the United States

== Notes ==
Legal offices
| Preceded by Howell Jackson | Associate Justice of the Supreme Court of the United States; 1896–1909 | Succeeded by Horace Lurton |
