= List of United States Supreme Court cases, volume 215 =

Supreme Court of the United States
- Interactive map of Supreme Court of the United States
- 38°53′26″N 77°00′16″W
- Established: March 4, 1789; 236 years ago
- Location: Washington, D.C.
- Coordinates: 38°53′26″N 77°00′16″W
- Composition method: Presidential nomination with Senate confirmation
- Authorised by: Constitution of the United States, Art. III, § 1
- Judge term length: life tenure, subject to impeachment and removal
- Number of positions: 9 (by statute)
- Website: supremecourt.gov

This is a list of cases reported in volume 215 of United States Reports, decided by the Supreme Court of the United States in 1909 and 1910.

== Justices of the Supreme Court at the time of volume 215 U.S. ==
The Supreme Court is established by Article III, Section 1 of the Constitution of the United States, which says: "The judicial Power of the United States, shall be vested in one supreme Court . . .". The size of the Court is not specified; the Constitution leaves it to Congress to set the number of justices. Under the Judiciary Act of 1789 Congress originally fixed the number of justices at six (one chief justice and five associate justices). Since 1789 Congress has varied the size of the Court from six to seven, nine, ten, and back to nine justices (always including one chief justice).

When the cases in volume 215 were decided the Court comprised the following members (during the period that these cases were being adjudicated, Justice Peckham died and Justice Lurton succeeded him):

Portrait	Justice	Office	Home State	Succeeded	Date confirmed by the Senate (Vote)	Tenure on Supreme Court
	Melville Fuller	Chief Justice	Illinois	Morrison Waite	July 20, 1888 (41–20)	October 8, 1888 – July 4, 1910 (Died)
	John Marshall Harlan	Associate Justice	Kentucky	David Davis	November 29, 1877 (Acclamation)	December 10, 1877 – October 14, 1911 (Died)
	David Josiah Brewer	Associate Justice	Kansas	Stanley Matthews	December 18, 1889 (53–11)	January 6, 1890 – March 28, 1910 (Died)
	Edward Douglass White	Associate Justice	Louisiana	Samuel Blatchford	February 19, 1894 (Acclamation)	March 12, 1894 – December 18, 1910 (Continued as chief justice)
	Rufus W. Peckham	Associate Justice	New York	Howell Edmunds Jackson	December 9, 1895 (Acclamation)	January 6, 1896 – October 24, 1909 (Died)
	Joseph McKenna	Associate Justice	California	Stephen Johnson Field	January 21, 1898 (Acclamation)	January 26, 1898 – January 5, 1925 (Retired)
	Oliver Wendell Holmes Jr.	Associate Justice	Massachusetts	Horace Gray	December 4, 1902 (Acclamation)	December 8, 1902 – January 12, 1932 (Retired)
	William R. Day	Associate Justice	Ohio	George Shiras Jr.	February 23, 1903 (Acclamation)	March 2, 1903 – November 13, 1922 (Retired)
	William Henry Moody	Associate Justice	Massachusetts	Henry Billings Brown	December 12, 1906 (Acclamation)	December 17, 1906 – November 20, 1910 (Retired)
	Horace Harmon Lurton	Associate Justice	Tennessee	Rufus W. Peckham	December 20, 1909 (Acclamation)	January 3, 1910 – July 12, 1914 (Died)

== Citation style ==
Under the Judiciary Act of 1789 the federal court structure at the time comprised District Courts, which had general trial jurisdiction; Circuit Courts, which had mixed trial and appellate (from the US District Courts) jurisdiction; and the United States Supreme Court, which had appellate jurisdiction over the federal District and Circuit courts—and for certain issues over state courts. The Supreme Court also had limited original jurisdiction (i.e., in which cases could be filed directly with the Supreme Court without first having been heard by a lower federal or state court). There were one or more federal District Courts and/or Circuit Courts in each state, territory, or other geographical region.

The Judiciary Act of 1891 created the United States Courts of Appeals and reassigned the jurisdiction of most routine appeals from the district and circuit courts to these appellate courts. The Act created nine new courts that were originally known as the "United States Circuit Courts of Appeals." The new courts had jurisdiction over most appeals of lower court decisions. The Supreme Court could review either legal issues that a court of appeals certified or decisions of court of appeals by writ of certiorari.

Bluebook citation style is used for case names, citations, and jurisdictions.

- "# Cir." = United States Court of Appeals
  - e.g., "3d Cir." = United States Court of Appeals for the Third Circuit
- "C.C.D." = United States Circuit Court for the District of . . .
  - e.g.,"C.C.D.N.J." = United States Circuit Court for the District of New Jersey
- "D." = United States District Court for the District of . . .
  - e.g.,"D. Mass." = United States District Court for the District of Massachusetts
- "E." = Eastern; "M." = Middle; "N." = Northern; "S." = Southern; "W." = Western
  - e.g.,"C.C.S.D.N.Y." = United States Circuit Court for the Southern District of New York
  - e.g.,"M.D. Ala." = United States District Court for the Middle District of Alabama
- "Ct. Cl." = United States Court of Claims
- The abbreviation of a state's name alone indicates the highest appellate court in that state's judiciary at the time.
  - e.g.,"Pa." = Supreme Court of Pennsylvania
  - e.g.,"Me." = Supreme Judicial Court of Maine

== List of cases in volume 215 U.S. ==
Case Name	Page & year	Opinion of the Court	Concurring opinion(s)	Dissenting opinion(s)	Lower Court	Disposition
Fall v. Eastin	1 (1909)	McKenna	Holmes	none	Neb.	affirmed
Reavis v. Fianza	16 (1909)	Holmes	none	none	Phil.	affirmed
United States v. Mescall	26 (1909)	Brewer	none	none	C.C.E.D.N.Y.	reversed
Waterman v. Canal L.B. & T. Co.	33 (1909)	Day	none	none	C.C.E.D. La.	reversed
United States v. Union Supply Co.	50 (1909)	Holmes	none	none	D.N.J.	reversed
Fleming v. McCurtain	56 (1909)	Holmes	none	none	C.C.E.D. Okla.	affirmed
Marbles v. Creecy	63 (1909)	Harlan	none	none	C.C.E.D. Mo.	affirmed
McGilvra v. Ross	70 (1909)	McKenna	none	none	9th Cir.	reversed
Sylvester v. Washington	80 (1909)	Holmes	none	none	Wash.	affirmed
El Paso & N.R.R. Co. v. Gutierrez	87 (1909)	Day	none	none	Tex.	affirmed
ICC v. Stickney	98 (1909)	Brewer	none	none	C.C.D. Minn.	affirmed
Hanover Nat'l Bank v. Suddath I	110 (1909)	White	none	none	2d Cir.	affirmed
Hanover Nat'l Bank v. Suddath II	122 (1909)	White	none	none	2d Cir.	affirmed
Kenney v. Craven	125 (1909)	White	none	none	Mass. Super. Ct.	dismissed
The S.S. Jefferson	130 (1909)	White	none	none	E.D. Va.	reversed
Scully v. Squier	144 (1909)	McKenna	none	none	Sup. Ct. Idaho	affirmed
Rumford C.W. v. Hygienic C. Co.	156 (1909)	Holmes	none	none	multiple	multiple
Steward v. American Lava Co.	161 (1909)	Holmes	none	none	6th Cir.	affirmed
Louisiana ex rel. Hubert v. City of New Orleans	170 (1909)	Day	none	none	La.	reversed
Caliga v. Inter Ocean Newspaper Co.	182 (1909)	Day	none	none	7th Cir.	affirmed
United States v. Stevenson I	190 (1909)	Day	none	none	D. Mass.	reversed
United States v. Stevenson II	200 (1909)	Day	none	none	D. Mass.	reversed
Everett v. Everett	203 (1909)	Harlan	none	none	N.Y. Sup. Ct.	dismissed
Baltimore & O.R.R. Co. v. ICC	216 (1909)	Fuller	none	none	C.C.D. Md.	order set aside
Southern P. Co. v. ICC	226 (1909)	Fuller	none	none	C.C.N.D. Cal.	dismissed
Yordi v. Nolte	227 (1909)	Fuller	none	none	W.D. Tex.	affirmed
United States v. Corbett	233 (1909)	White	none	none	W.D. Wis.	reversed
Lathrop, et al. Co. v. Interior C. & I. Co.	246 (1909)	McKenna	none	none	C.C.W.D.N.Y.	reversed
Virginia C.C. Co. v. Kirven	252 (1909)	McKenna	none	none	S.C.	affirmed
Snyder v. Rosenbaum	261 (1909)	Holmes	none	none	Sup. Ct. Terr. Okla.	affirmed
Rio Grande D. & I. Co. v. United States	266 (1909)	Harlan	none	none	Sup. Ct. Terr N.M.	affirmed
United States v. Celestine	278 (1909)	Brewer	none	none	C.C.W.D. Wash.	reversed
United States v. Sutton	291 (1909)	Brewer	none	none	E.D. Wash.	reversed
Santa Fé Cnty. v. New Mexico ex rel. Coler	296 (1909)	McKenna	none	none	Sup. Ct. Terr. N.M.	affirmed
Illinois C.R.R. Co. v. Sheegog	308 (1909)	Holmes	none	Day	Ky.	affirmed
Graves v. Ashburn	331 (1909)	Holmes	none	none	5th Cir.	reversed
Scott Cnty. M.R. Co. v. Missouri ex rel. Hines	336 (1909)	Holmes	none	none	Mo.	affirmed
First Nat'l Bank v. City of Estherville	341 (1910)	Fuller	none	none	Iowa	dismissed
Kuhn v. Fairmont Coal Co.	349 (1910)	Harlan	none	Holmes	4th Cir.	certification
Henley v. Myers	373 (1910)	Harlan	none	none	Kan.	affirmed
Union Pacific Railroad Co. v. Harris	386 (1910)	Brewer	none	none	Kan.	affirmed
Komada & Co. v. United States	392 (1910)	Brewer	none	none	9th Cir.	affirmed
Elias v. Ramirez	398 (1910)	McKenna	none	none	Sup. Ct. Terr. Ariz.	reversed
Tiglao v. Philippines	410 (1910)	Holmes	none	none	Phil.	affirmed
City of Minneapolis v. Minneapolis Street R.R. Co.	417 (1910)	Day	none	none	C.C.D. Minn.	affirmed
Mechanical A. Co. v. Castleman	437 (1910)	Day	none	none	C.C.E.D. Mo.	reversed
Haffner v. Dobrinski	446 (1910)	Fuller	none	none	Sup. Ct. Terr Okla.	affirmed
Interstate Commerce Commission v. Illinois Central Railroad Co.	452 (1910)	White	none	none	C.C.N.D. Ill.	reversed
Interstate Commerce Commission v. Chicago & A.R.R. Co.	479 (1910)	White	none	none	C.C.N.D. Ill.	reversed
Baltimore & O.R.R. Co. v. United States ex rel. P.C. Co.	481 (1910)	White	none	none	4th Cir.	reversed
Macon Grocery Co. v. Atlantic Coast Line Railroad Co.	501 (1910)	White	none	Harlan	5th Cir.	affirmed
North Dakota ex rel. Flaherty v. Hanson	515 (1910)	White	none	none	N.D.	reversed
Brill v. Washington Railway and Electric Company	527 (1910)	Holmes	none	none	D.C. Cir.	affirmed
Mankin v. United States ex rel. Ludowici-C. Co.	533 (1910)	Day	none	none	5th Cir.	affirmed
O.N. Williams Co. v. United States	541 (1910)	Fuller	none	none	4th Cir.	affirmed
Wagg v. Herbert	546 (1910)	Brewer	none	none	Sup. Ct. Terr Okla.	affirmed
Lowrey v. Hawaii	554 (1910)	McKenna	none	none	Sup. Ct. Terr. Haw.	reversed
United States v. Shipp	580 (1909)	Fuller	none	none	original	contempt sentences

== See also ==
- Certificate of division
