= Styles Hutchins =

American attorney and politician

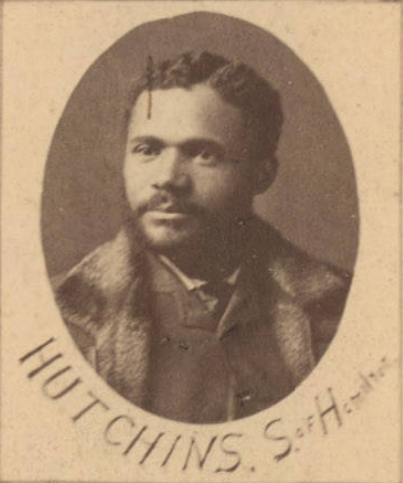

Tennessee House of Representatives
- In office 1887–1888

Personal details
- Born: November 1, 1852 Lawrenceville, Georgia, U.S.
- Died: September 7, 1950 (aged 97) Mattoon, Illinois, U.S.
- Party: Republican
- Education: University of South Carolina School of Law
- Occupation: Attorney, Politician, Activist
- Known for: First African American admitted to legal practice in Georgia, member of Tennessee General Assembly (1887-1888), participant in legal defense of Ed Johnson

Styles Linton Hutchins (November 1, 1852 – September 7, 1950) was an attorney, politician, and activist in South Carolina, Georgia, and Tennessee between 1877 (the end of Reconstruction) and 1906 (the height of Jim Crow). Hutchins was among the last African Americans to graduate from the University of South Carolina School of Law in the brief window during Reconstruction when the school was open to Black students and the first Black attorney admitted to practice in Georgia. He practiced law and participated in Georgia and Tennessee politics. He served a single term (1887–1888) in the Tennessee General Assembly as one of its last Black members before an era of entrenched white supremacist policies that lasted until 1965, and advocated for the interests of African Americans. He called for reparations and attempted to identify or create a separate homeland for Blacks. He was a member of the defense team in the 1906 appeal on civil rights grounds by Ed Johnson of a conviction of rape, a case which reached the Supreme Court before it was halted by Johnson's murder by lynching in Chattanooga, Tennessee.

== Education and personal life ==
Styles Linton Hutchins was born on November 1, 1852, in Lawrenceville, Georgia, the son of William Dougherty Hutchins and an unknown mother. As a slave, Dougherty Hutchins was the legal property of Judge N. L. Hutchins of Lawrenceville, a major slaveowner who is documented in the slave schedule of the 1860 census as owning more than 40 people. He bought his freedom around or within a few years of the birth of his son. Dougherty Hutchins established a barbershop at Stone Mountain, Georgia, then relocated to Atlanta, where he became one of a small group of Black barbers who owned their own shops before the Civil War. He continued to own barbershops throughout his life. For two years in the early 1880s he formed a partnership with Alonzo Herndon, a fellow barber who would later become an insurance executive and Atlanta's first Black millionaire.

Dougherty Hutchins married in 1863 and he and his wife Anna had at least one child, a daughter named Stazier, around 1867. Their marriage ended in divorce in 1887. The 1870 census indicates that in addition to Dougherty and Anna, Styles, and Stazier, the Hutchins household at this time included another young man, nineteen-year-old Alvin Hutchins.

According to legal testimony he gave in 1876, Hutchins spent his late teens and early twenties traveling through the Southern United States, visiting Georgia, Alabama, Mississippi, Arkansas, Texas, and South Carolina. He married Clara (or Clarra) Harris in Glynn County, Georgia, on September 11, 1874, when he was 21 years old. During 1875 he taught school in Laurens County, South Carolina. In December 1876, Hutchins received a Bachelor of Law degree from the University of South Carolina and was admitted to practice before the South Carolina Supreme Court.

During 1877 and 1878, Hutchins lived and practiced law in Columbia and Newberry, South Carolina and Atlanta before settling in Darien, Georgia, where he remained until the end of 1881. In December 1881 newspapers reported that he had been sentenced to two years in prison for the theft of assets that had been entrusted to him.

In 1883, Hutchins established a legal practice in Chattanooga, Tennessee. Soon afterwards he was divorced from his wife Clara. On May 25, 1887, he married Cora Martin in Chattanooga and they had two children, Viola, born in May 1887, and Stiles Leonard (or Lennard), born in October 1893. Cora Hutchins died on November 14, 1895, and was buried at Forest Hills Cemetery in Chattanooga. Three months later, in February 1896, Hutchins married Mattie Smith, who was 23 years his junior. They remained married until Hutchins' death in 1950.

The Hutchins family left Tennessee for the Midwest in late 1906 or early 1907, and by 1910 they were settled in Peoria, Illinois. By 1917, they had moved to Kewanee, Illinois and Hutchins had retired from legal work and was operating a barbershop in his home. By 1927, the Hutchinses had relocated for the last time to Mattoon, Illinois. Hutchins continued to work as a barber until 1943, when he retired at age 91.

Styles Hutchins died at Memorial Hospital in Mattoon, Illinois on September 7, 1950, aged 97, survived by his wife Mattie and his children. At the time of his death he was a member of Jehovah's Witnesses. Hutchins is buried at Dodge Grove Cemetery in Mattoon.

== Public life ==
He served as a state judge in South Carolina, but returned to Georgia after the Democrats regained power in South Carolina.

In 1878, after a lengthy struggle, he became the first African American member of Georgia's bar association. He subsequently became the first African American to argue a case in a Georgia court.

After moving to Chattanooga in 1881, he established a law practice there. Hutchins and his partner Noah W. Parden handled a substantial portion of all criminal cases involving black people in southern Tennessee and represented almost two-thirds of Black Chattanoogans accused of stealing, fighting, loitering and assault. The firm also represented murderers and business owners and handled real estate transactions. Being lawyers, Hutchins and Parden were highly respected members of Chattanooga's Black community.

He was elected to the Tennessee House of Representatives as a Republican candidate in 1886, representing Hamilton County from 1887 to 1888. Hutchins was the first Black Chattanoogan to hold an elected state office. During his time in office, he managed to convince the assembly to overturn a section of the Chattanooga charter that limited voting rights in city elections to those who paid poll taxes. He also made an unsuccessful attempt to overturn the convict lease system.

In 1909, Hutchins and Noah W. Parden filed a habeas corpus petition at the United States Supreme Court on behalf of Ed Johnson, who had been convicted of rape and sentenced to death. The two managed to convince the court to issue a stay of execution. The night the court issued the order, a lynch mob, abetted by Chattanooga Sheriff John Shipp, murdered Johnson. Hutchins and his partner urged officials to prosecute the perpetrators. While the Court did find the Sheriff and several of the mob members to be guilty of contempt of court in United States v. Shipp, they were only given short prison sentences and released early. Their actions in defense of Johnson led to Hutchins and Parden being targeted and their law practice being set on fire; both attorneys had to flee town for Oklahoma.

== See also ==
- Judson Whitlocke Lyons
- African Americans in Tennessee
- African American officeholders from the end of the Civil War until before 1900
