= Tennessee Riverwalk =

Riverside footpath in Tennessee, United States

- Riverside path
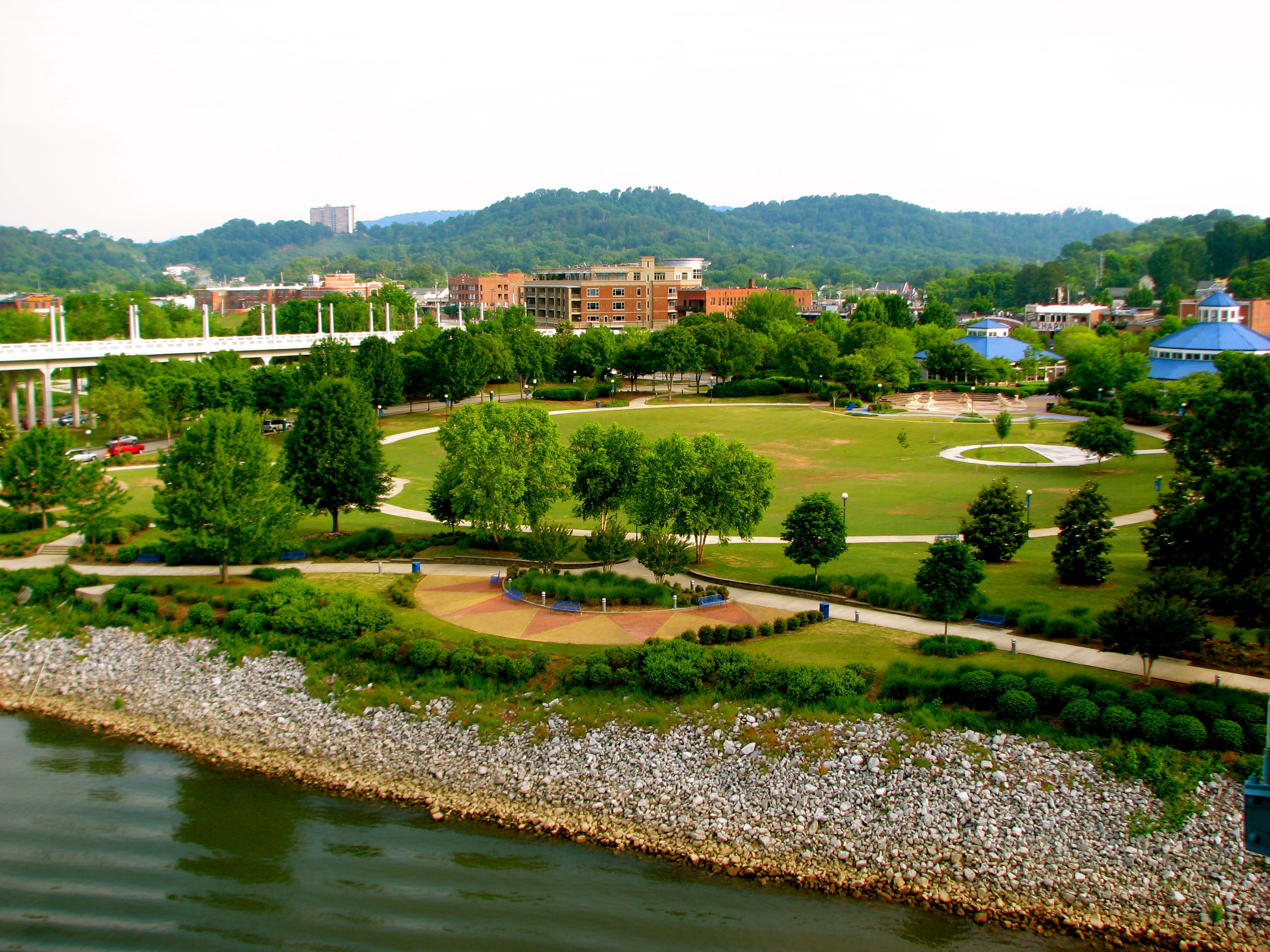
- View of Coolidge Park which contains part of the Tennessee Riverwalk
- Interactive map of Tennessee Riverwalk
- Coordinates: 35.0773°N 85.2679°W
- Country: United States
- State: Tennessee
- City: Chattanooga

Dimensions
  - Length: 13 mi (21 km)

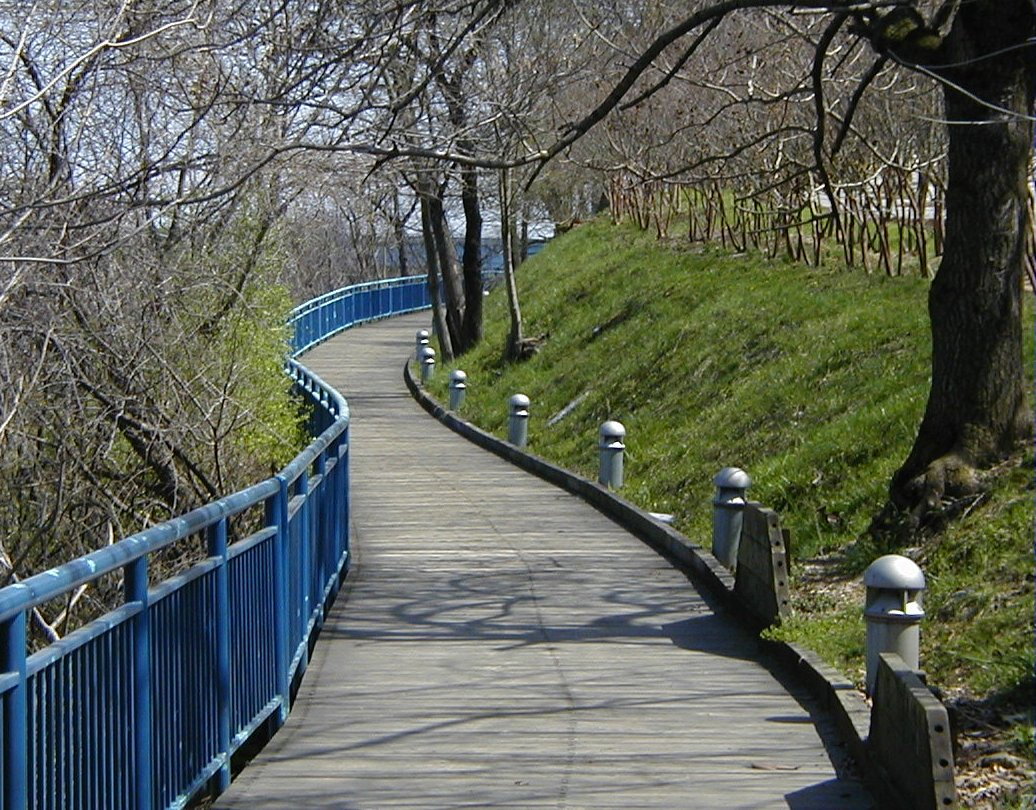
Part of the Tennessee Riverwalk

The Tennessee Riverwalk is a 13-mile (21-km) riverside path which parallels the Tennessee River from the Chickamauga Dam to downtown Chattanooga, Tennessee. It is part of the Tennessee Riverpark System featuring the Tennessee Riverpark, Coolidge Park, Renaissance Park, Ross's Landing, the Walnut Street Bridge, the Blue Goose Hollow section and the old U.S. Pipe property.

The initial segment was opened in May 1989.

The Riverwalk is a mix of paved pathways, boardwalks, and bridges along the river, through marshland, and over creeks. Restroom facilities and drinking fountains are conveniently spaced along the path.

Nine brightly colored quarter-inch-thick stainless steel silhouettes mark each milestone along the Riverwalk, including a bird watcher, bluegrass musician, bicyclists, a man in a wheelchair and another strolling, a jogging father and daughter, and a family group.
