= Noah W. Parden =

American lawyer

Noah Walter Parden
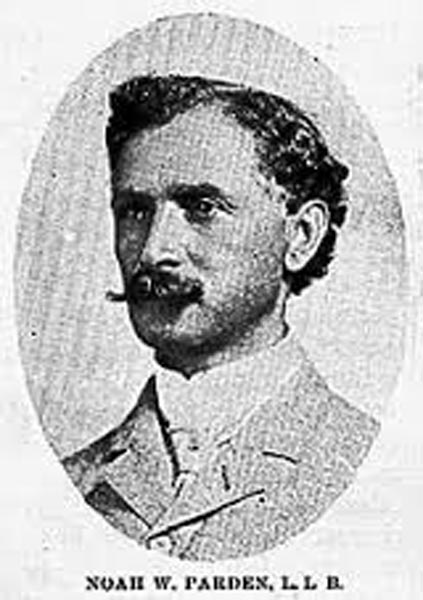
- Born: 1868; Rome, Georgia, U.S.
- Died: February 23, 1944 (aged 75–76); St. Louis, Missouri, U.S.
- Occupations: Attorney, Politician
- Years active: 1891–1940
- Known for: One of the first African-American attorneys to argue before the United States Supreme Court

Noah Walter Parden (c. 1868 – February 23, 1944) was an African-American attorney and politician who was active in Chattanooga, Tennessee, East St. Louis, Illinois, and St. Louis, Missouri between 1891 and 1940. In 1906 he became one of the first African-American attorneys to serve as lead counsel in a case before the United States Supreme Court, and he was among the first to make an oral argument before the Court. In 1935 he became the first African American to be appointed to the position of Assistant Prosecuting Attorney, a public office, in St. Louis.

== Education and personal life ==
Noah Parden was born near Rome, Georgia, probably in 1868. His mother was a former slave who worked as a housekeeper and cook. His father was a white man. When he was about seven years old he was sent to an orphanage after the death of his mother, who had raised him as a single parent.

In 1884 he left Rome for Chattanooga, Tennessee, where he supported himself by working as a barber and at other odd jobs while he spent five years attending Howard High School. He graduated in May 1890, presenting the class oration on "The Duty of a Citizen." He then enrolled as a senior in the law department at Central Tennessee College in Nashville, graduating in 1891.

In 1892 he married Mattie S. Broyles (March 29, 1870 – July 15, 1934), a native of Dalton, Georgia whom he had met in Nashville, and they settled in Chattanooga where they remained until 1906. They had two children, Frank B. Parden, who died August 22, 1925, and Lillian Parden Bracy. After leaving Chattanooga, Parden and his family moved briefly to Pueblo, Colorado and then settled in East St. Louis, Illinois. In 1922 the Pardens moved to neighboring St. Louis, Missouri, although Noah Parden continued to maintain a law office in East St. Louis.

After Mattie Parden's death in 1934, Noah Parden married Elizabeth Polk, a divorcee from East St. Louis. Her former husband Tranne Polk, an East St. Louis detective and politician, had been acquitted on charges of assaulting Parden in 1933. During the trial, Polk testified that Parden had interfered in his personal affairs.

Parden was able to speak several languages, played the violin, and was knowledgeable about art, music and literature. He also remained connected to his rural roots. By the end of the 1920s he had acquired a 400-acre cotton plantation near Hickory, Mississippi, where he vacationed and to which he would briefly retire before returning to live in St. Louis until the end of his life. On the farm, he did agricultural work to relax; he also knew how to sew, knit and make his own clothing.

Parden died on February 23, 1944, and was buried at Booker Washington Cemetery in Centreville Station, Illinois. He was survived by his wife Elizabeth, his daughter, and a stepdaughter, Gertrude Polk.

== Legal and political career ==
Noah Parden practiced law from 1891 to 1940, a career which spanned 49 years. At the end of 1929 he claimed to have defended 236 people accused of murder, of whom one had been legally executed and another lynched. In addition to his private legal practice he also worked as a prosecutor, serving for nine years (1908-1917) as an assistant state's attorney in St. Clair County, Illinois, and for five years (1935-1940) as an Assistant Prosecuting Attorney in St. Louis. He intermittently engaged in writing, editing and public speaking, and was involved in local politics in East St. Louis and St. Louis.

=== Activities in Chattanooga, 1891-1906 ===
After receiving his law degree in 1891 Noah Parden began his career as an attorney in Chattanooga. in 1892, he briefly established a partnership with another black attorney, James P. Easley. During 1895 Parden and Easley also published a newspaper, the Chattanooga Herald, although Parden soon sold his share in the paper. He gained a reputation as an effective defense attorney who was able to obtain victories for his African-American clients in jury trials despite the all-white juries employed in local courts.

==== The Ed Johnson case and United States v. Shipp (203 U.S. 563 [1906]) ====
In 1906 Parden was asked to represent Ed Johnson, a black Chattanooga man who had been convicted of the rape of Nevada Taylor, a white woman, and sentenced to death. Together with Styles L. Hutchins, an African-American attorney and former Tennessee state legislator, and Lewis Shepherd, a white attorney and former judge, Parden began working to overturn Johnson's conviction. No concrete evidence linked Johnson to the crime, and, as Parden argued, the trial had been replete with errors including open demonstrations of bias against Johnson by a member of the jury, exclusion of blacks from the jury pool, and a so-called mob mentality in the courtroom during the trial. Nevertheless, the Chattanooga court refused to reopen the case and the Tennessee Supreme Court refused to authorize a stay of execution that would have allowed for a new trial, on the grounds that there had been no specific error in the trial to warrant it. Parden then filed a petition for a writ of habeas corpus with the U.S. Federal Court in Knoxville, citing the Habeas Corpus Act of 1867, which allowed defendants in state court cases to seek relief from federal courts if they believed their Constitutional rights had been violated. He argued that the state courts had violated Johnson's rights by excluding blacks from juries, a form of discrimination which the United States Supreme Court had determined to be illegal. Although the court rejected this argument, Judge C.D. Clark did stay Johnson's execution to allow Parden and his colleagues to appeal the case to the Supreme Court, which had the power to rule in favor of federal intervention in a state court case.

On March 17, 1906, Parden presented his petition before Justice John Marshall Harlan, arguing that the Johnson trial had included flagrant violations of the defendant's Constitutional rights. The following day the Court accepted the case, staying Johnson's sentence and ordering both sides to prepare for oral arguments. On the night of March 18, however, a mob in Chattanooga broke into the jail, kidnapped Johnson, and lynched him, hanging him from the Walnut Street bridge over the Tennessee River.

The federal government responded to the lynching as a violation of federal law, as Johnson had been under the protection of a Supreme Court order when it occurred. Hamilton County Sheriff Joseph F. Shipp, seven of his deputies, and a group of men thought to have belonged to the lynch mob were charged with criminal contempt of the United States Supreme Court, the mob members for their role in Johnson's murder and the law enforcement officers for willfully neglecting to protect him despite the likelihood of mob violence. In 1909 Shipp and five others were found guilty of contempt after the only criminal trial ever conducted by the Supreme Court. Noah Parden and Styles Hutchins worked with the Justice Department in gathering information and identifying witnesses for the case; however, both attorneys ended their involvement before the case went to trial, and neither returned to Chattanooga, where supporters of Shipp and the lynch mob had threatened and intimidated those they considered their enemies.

=== Activities in East St. Louis and St. Louis, 1907-1940 ===
Noah Parden spent the remainder of his professional life in the twin cities of East St. Louis, Illinois, where he settled in late 1906 or early 1907, and St. Louis, Missouri, where he relocated with his family in 1922. His practice included white as well as black clients, and he held elective office by serving on the St. Clair County Board of Supervisors, to which he was elected in 1907 and where he chaired the judiciary committee. However, this phase of his career also reflected the segregated character of the two cities' legal and political institutions.

==== Work as a prosecutor ====
Parden served as a prosecutor in both cities. He was appointed to multiple two-year terms as an Assistant State's Attorney in East St. Louis, serving from 1908 to 1917, and became the first black attorney to be appointed an Assistant Prosecuting Attorney in St. Louis, a position he held from 1935 until his retirement in 1940. In both jurisdictions he was assigned the task of trying African Americans brought before the court. In East St. Louis his work included prosecution of black suspects accused of carrying concealed weapons, an arrangement which, according to historian Charles Lumpkins, provided black people with "access to legal redress" that would not otherwise have been available. In St. Louis, his job was to prosecute black men accused of abandoning their families.

==== Involvement with East St. Louis reform and machine politics ====
Parden quickly became politically active in East St. Louis. In 1910 he ran for the position of Assistant State's Attorney on the ticket of the Progressive Citizens' Party, a reform group which had coalesced in opposition to the Administration (Democratic regular) party allied with the political machine led by boss Locke Tarleton. His Administration opponent, dentist and activist Dr. Leroy Bundy, was also an African American, and black East St. Louisians anticipated that this support by white political leaders for black candidates would lead to greater black access to local government. However, the Progressive Citizens Party ran on an anti-corruption platform and did not extend patronage or access to African Americans, while the machine was perceived as stingy with its money and patronage. Both Parden and Bundy became part of a group of black professional men who responded by forming an all-black Republican organization, the St. Clair County Republican League, in 1916. This independent group sought to navigate between East St. Louis's white political factions and gain more benefits for black residents; sociologist Elliot Rudwick has argued that "Bundy and his followers were demanding political equality" via access to the same pool of money and city jobs that was available to white voters. In doing so they became involved in political corruption themselves.

In 1916 Parden worked for the Republican Party with the expectation of reappointment as Assistant State's Attorney after the election. In the lead-up to the 1917 mayoral election, incumbent Fred Mollman and his allies exerted pressure on black voters. Mollman promised to hire more black policemen and build a firehouse in a black neighborhood as incentives for their support, while Parden's boss, State's Attorney Hubert Schaumleffel, threatened them. Parden was enlisted to convey to African-American saloon owners and participants in the gambling and prostitution businesses that if Mollman won the election, a crackdown on their establishments which had taken effect early in 1917 would be lifted. After Mollman's victory Parden, along with hundreds of other politically-involved African Americans, participated in a post-election banquet attended by the mayor and his allies.

==== The 1917 Race Riot and its aftermath ====
On July 2, 1917, East St. Louis was engulfed by a bloody race riot, characterized by violent attacks by white mobs on blacks to whom little protection was provided by law enforcement. Hundreds of black residents were killed and thousands left homeless by the riots. Although Noah Parden encouraged his client and one-time political rival Leroy Bundy to leave the city during the tense days before the riot, he himself remained at his home in East St. Louis, later testifying that on the night of July 1 he had responded to the arrival of a carload of white men cruising past his house in a Model T Ford and shooting from the car, by running to his own front door with a gun.

The Parden family survived the riot unharmed, but its aftermath was professionally damaging to Parden. He had lost his post as Assistant State's Attorney after an initial outbreak of white-on-black violence in May 1917, when the Board of Supervisors abolished the position. After the July riots he was arrested along with other black leaders, based on the assumption that they must have been promoting discontent among the black populace. Parden was among those charged with organizing a black militia. He was not convicted (and there was no evidence that a black militia had in fact been organized), and he was able to testify on Bundy's behalf when Bundy was tried for participating in a conspiracy to provoke the riots. However, other black East St. Louisians were convicted on riot-related charges and sent to prison. In 1924 Parden and other black Republicans supported the re-election campaign of Illinois governor Len Small, who not only appointed African Americans to public positions but had granted clemency to some of those convicted for their alleged roles in the riots.

==== Legal practice in St. Louis ====
After relocating to St. Louis, Parden practiced law in both Illinois and Missouri. His successes as a defense attorney included the 1923 St. Louis case of Joseph Kyle, a black man who was found not guilty of murdering a white police officer by reason of self-defense, the officer and his partner having shot first at Kyle in the dark and without identifying themselves. He also remained involved in local politics, becoming active as a Democrat in St. Louis's Twenty-third Ward. He spent the final five years of his career working as an Assistant Prosecuting Attorney and was recognized as the first black attorney to be appointed to the position.

== Appearance before the United States Supreme Court ==
Noah Parden was admitted to the bar of the United States Supreme Court in 1906 on the recommendation of Emanuel D. Molyneaux Hewlett, an African American attorney and member of the Supreme Court bar who acted as a co-counsel in many cases involving black southerners. His only appearance before the court was in connection with the Ed Johnson case, during which he made an emergency appeal before Justice John Marshall Harlan in chambers.

=== Argument before the Supreme Court ===
Parden's argument before Justice Harlan marked the first time that the Supreme Court involved itself in a lynching case. In his presentation, Parden argued that Johnson's trial had violated his Constitutional rights under the Fourth, Fifth, Sixth and Fourteenth Amendments. Legal analyst Mark Curriden and attorney Leroy Phillips note that all of the issues of Constitutional interpretation raised by Parden were later accepted by the Supreme Court. In terms of the Johnson case, Parden's most important argument was that the right to a fair trial guaranteed by the Sixth Amendment applied to state as well as federal courts. Prior to Parden's appearance before Harlan, the Court had been reluctant to claim federal jurisdiction over state courts, but the evidence of flagrant denial of Johnson's rights that Parden presented led them to do so, in what Curriden and Phillips describe as a "precedent-setting" intervention.

=== Status as an African-American pioneer ===
Parden was among a small number of African-American attorneys to present cases before the Supreme Court during the nineteenth and early twentieth centuries. In their 1999 study Contempt of Court, Curriden and Phillips asserted that he was the first black attorney to reach two milestones: presentation of an oral argument before a member of the Court (rather than being part of a team of attorneys in which another, white lawyer made the oral arguments), and recognition as lead attorney on a case accepted by the full Supreme Court. However, other black attorneys preceded Parden in one or both of these categories. In 1890 Everett J. Waring, a black lawyer and educator born in Columbus, Ohio, and practicing law in Baltimore, Maryland, argued the case of Jones v. United States (137 U.S. 202 [1890]) before the Court; law professor J. Clay Smith and others describe Waring as the first African American to present an argument. Two other black attorneys argued a pair of cases before the court on December 13, 1895, which challenged laws excluding blacks from grand juries in Mississippi. Parden's co-counsel E.M. Hewlett, along with lawyer and politician Cornelius J. Jones, argued Gibson v. State of Mississippi (162 U.S. 565 [1896]) and Smith v. State of Mississippi (162 U.S. 592 [1896]). In Smith, Jones was the sole representative of the plaintiff in error, while in Gibson that position was filled by Hewlett. In 1900, Wilford H. Smith became the first African-American attorney to win a case before the Supreme Court, Carter v. Texas (177 U.S. 442 [1900]), in which he also served as lead attorney along with co-counsel Hewlett.

== Recognition and honors ==
Since the beginning of the twenty-first century, Parden's career and accomplishments have begun to receive public recognition. In 2003, the Illinois General Assembly adopted a resolution honoring Parden "for his dedication and commitment to the causes of justice and equality," and recognizing "his contributions to the citizens of Illinois and the country." In 2013 the Southern Center for Human Rights inaugurated the Noah Parden and Styles Hutchins Fellowships, three-year awards supporting attorneys working at the center, in honor of Parden and his partner in the Johnson appeal.

In September 2021 the Ed Johnson Memorial was unveiled at the foot of the Walnut Street Bridge in Chattanooga. The installation, created by artist Jerome B. Meadows, includes life-sized sculptures of Johnson, Parden and Hutchins. In November 2023 the United States District Court for the Eastern District of Tennessee installed portraits of Parden and Hutchins outside the courtroom at the Joel W. Solomon Federal Building in Chattanooga.
