= List of United States Supreme Court cases, volume 203 =

Supreme Court of the United States
- Interactive map of Supreme Court of the United States
- 38°53′26″N 77°00′16″W
- Established: March 4, 1789; 236 years ago
- Location: Washington, D.C.
- Coordinates: 38°53′26″N 77°00′16″W
- Composition method: Presidential nomination with Senate confirmation
- Authorised by: Constitution of the United States, Art. III, § 1
- Judge term length: life tenure, subject to impeachment and removal
- Number of positions: 9 (by statute)
- Website: supremecourt.gov

This is a list of cases reported in volume 203 of United States Reports, decided by the Supreme Court of the United States in 1906.

== Justices of the Supreme Court at the time of volume 203 U.S. ==
The Supreme Court is established by Article III, Section 1 of the Constitution of the United States, which says: "The judicial Power of the United States, shall be vested in one supreme Court . . .". The size of the Court is not specified; the Constitution leaves it to Congress to set the number of justices. Under the Judiciary Act of 1789 Congress originally fixed the number of justices at six (one chief justice and five associate justices). Since 1789 Congress has varied the size of the Court from six to seven, nine, ten, and back to nine justices (always including one chief justice).

When the cases in volume 203 were decided the Court comprised the following eight members (Justice William Henry Moody did not join the Court until after all of the cases in volume 203 had been argued):

| Portrait | Justice | Office | Home State | Succeeded | Date confirmed by the Senate (Vote) | Tenure on Supreme Court |
|---|---|---|---|---|---|---|
| | Melville Fuller | Chief Justice | Illinois | Morrison Waite | July 20, 1888 (41–20) | October 8, 1888 – July 4, 1910 (Died) |
| | John Marshall Harlan | Associate Justice | Kentucky | David Davis | November 29, 1877 (Acclamation) | December 10, 1877 – October 14, 1911 (Died) |
| | David Josiah Brewer | Associate Justice | Kansas | Stanley Matthews | December 18, 1889 (53–11) | January 6, 1890 – March 28, 1910 (Died) |
| | Edward Douglass White | Associate Justice | Louisiana | Samuel Blatchford | February 19, 1894 (Acclamation) | March 12, 1894 – December 18, 1910 (Continued as chief justice) |
| | Rufus W. Peckham | Associate Justice | New York | Howell Edmunds Jackson | December 9, 1895 (Acclamation) | January 6, 1896 – October 24, 1909 (Died) |
| | Joseph McKenna | Associate Justice | California | Stephen Johnson Field | January 21, 1898 (Acclamation) | January 26, 1898 – January 5, 1925 (Retired) |
| | Oliver Wendell Holmes Jr. | Associate Justice | Massachusetts | Horace Gray | December 4, 1902 (Acclamation) | December 8, 1902 – January 12, 1932 (Retired) |
| | William R. Day | Associate Justice | Ohio | George Shiras Jr. | February 23, 1903 (Acclamation) | March 2, 1903 – November 13, 1922 (Retired) |

== Notable Cases in 203 U.S. ==
=== Hodges v. United States ===
Hodges v. United States, 203 U.S. 1 (1906), is a decision by the Supreme Court limiting the power of Congress to make laws under the Thirteenth Amendment. Three white men had been convicted of conspiring against black sawmill workers. The statute that was used to convict the men prohibited conspiracy to deprive American citizens of their constitutional liberties, including the right to make contracts. The Supreme Court overturned the conviction, holding that Congress did not have the right to intervene against racially motivated interference with labor contracts.

=== Northwestern Nat. Life Ins. Co. v. Riggs ===
Northwestern Nat. Life Ins. Co. v. Riggs, 203 U.S. 243 (1906), is a Supreme Court decision dealing with the power of individual states to regulate how corporations may conduct business. The Court ruled that the Fourteenth Amendment was not a bar to many state laws that effectively limited a corporation's right to contract business, so long as such limits were not unreasonable constraints on trade and due process for resolving conflicts and disputes existed.

=== United States v. Shipp ===
In United States v. Shipp, 203 U.S. 563 (1906), the Supreme Court ruled that Tennessee Sheriff Joseph F. Shipp and five others, had "in effect aided and abetted" the lynching of Ed Johnson, despite their knowing that Johnson's appeal of his conviction was pending in the Supreme Court. After trial in the Supreme Court they were held in contempt of court and sentenced to imprisonment. When Shipp was released, he was welcomed back to Tennessee as a hero.

== Citation style ==
Under the Judiciary Act of 1789 the federal court structure at the time comprised District Courts, which had general trial jurisdiction; Circuit Courts, which had mixed trial and appellate (from the US District Courts) jurisdiction; and the United States Supreme Court, which had appellate jurisdiction over the federal District and Circuit courts—and for certain issues over state courts. The Supreme Court also had limited original jurisdiction (i.e., in which cases could be filed directly with the Supreme Court without first having been heard by a lower federal or state court). There were one or more federal District Courts and/or Circuit Courts in each state, territory, or other geographical region.

The Judiciary Act of 1891 created the United States Courts of Appeals and reassigned the jurisdiction of most routine appeals from the district and circuit courts to these appellate courts. The Act created nine new courts that were originally known as the "United States Circuit Courts of Appeals." The new courts had jurisdiction over most appeals of lower court decisions. The Supreme Court could review either legal issues that a court of appeals certified or decisions of court of appeals by writ of certiorari.

Bluebook citation style is used for case names, citations, and jurisdictions.

- "# Cir." = United States Court of Appeals
  - e.g., "3d Cir." = United States Court of Appeals for the Third Circuit
- "C.C.D." = United States Circuit Court for the District of . . .
  - e.g.,"C.C.D.N.J." = United States Circuit Court for the District of New Jersey
- "D." = United States District Court for the District of . . .
  - e.g.,"D. Mass." = United States District Court for the District of Massachusetts
- "E." = Eastern; "M." = Middle; "N." = Northern; "S." = Southern; "W." = Western
  - e.g.,"C.C.S.D.N.Y." = United States Circuit Court for the Southern District of New York
  - e.g.,"M.D. Ala." = United States District Court for the Middle District of Alabama
- "Ct. Cl." = United States Court of Claims
- The abbreviation of a state's name alone indicates the highest appellate court in that state's judiciary at the time.
  - e.g.,"Pa." = Supreme Court of Pennsylvania
  - e.g.,"Me." = Supreme Judicial Court of Maine

== List of cases in volume 203 U.S. ==
| Case Name | Page & year | Opinion of the Court | Concurring opinion(s) | Dissenting opinion(s) | Lower Court | Disposition |
|---|---|---|---|---|---|---|
| Hodges v. United States | 1 (1906) | Brewer | none | Harlan | E.D. Ark. | reversed |
| New Mexico ex rel. McLean Co. v. Denver et al. R.R. Co. | 38 (1906) | Day | none | none | Sup. Ct. Terr. N.M. | affirmed |
| Landram v. Jordan | 56 (1906) | Holmes | none | none | D.C. Cir. | affirmed |
| Fidelity M.L. Ins. Co. v. Clark | 64 (1906) | Holmes | none | none | C.C.N.D. Tex. | affirmed |
| Cherokee Intermarriage Cases | 76 (1906) | Fuller | none | none | Ct. Cl. | affirmed |
| In re Moran | 96 (1906) | Holmes | none | none | Dist. Ct. Terr. Okla. | habeas corpus denied |
| Northern A. Co. v. Grand V.B. Ass'n | 106 (1906) | Holmes | none | none | Neb. | affirmed |
| Covington & C.B. Co v. Hager | 109 (1906) | Day | none | none | C.C.E.D. Ky. | affirmed |
| Wicomico Cnty. v. Bancroft | 112 (1906) | Day | none | none | 4th Cir. | reversed |
| Taylor v. Burns | 120 (1906) | Brewer | none | none | Sup. Ct. Terr. Ariz. | affirmed |
| Andrews v. Eastern O.L. Co. | 127 (1906) | Brewer | none | none | Or. | affirmed |
| Burt v. Smith | 129 (1906) | Holmes | none | none | N.Y. | dismissed |
| United States v. G. Riggs Co. | 136 (1906) | Holmes | none | none | 2d Cir. | reversed |
| Conboy v. First Nat'l Bank | 141 (1906) | Fuller | none | none | 2d Cir. | dismissed |
| Goudy v. Meath | 146 (1906) | Brewer | none | none | Wash. | affirmed |
| United A.M. v. State Council | 151 (1906) | Holmes | none | none | Va. | affirmed |
| Clark v. Wells | 174 (1906) | Day | none | none | C.C.D. Mont. | affirmed |
| Fisher v. Baker | 174 (1906) | Fuller | none | none | Phil. | dismissed |
| St Mary's et al. Co. v. West Virginia | 183 (1906) | Fuller | none | none | W. Va. | affirmed |
| Pettibone v. Nichols | 192 (1906) | Harlan | none | McKenna | C.C.D. Idaho | affirmed |
| Moyer v. Nichols | 221 (1906) | Harlan | none | McKenna | C.C.D. Idaho | affirmed |
| Appleyard v. Massachusetts | 222 (1906) | Harlan | none | none | C.C.D. Mass. | affirmed |
| Francis v. Francis | 233 (1906) | Harlan | none | none | Mich. | affirmed |
| Northwestern N.L. Ins. Co. v. Riggs | 243 (1906) | Harlan | none | none | C.C.W.D. Mo. | affirmed |
| Atlantic et al. R.R. Co. v. Florida ex rel. Ellis | 256 (1906) | Brewer | none | none | Fla. | affirmed |
| Seaboard et al. Ry. v. Florida ex rel. Ellis | 261 (1906) | Brewer | none | none | Fla. | affirmed |
| Heyman v. Southern Ry. Co. | 270 (1906) | White | none | none | Ga. | reversed |
| C.H. Nichols L. Co. v. Franson | 278 (1906) | White | none | none | C.C.W.D. Wash. | affirmed |
| Martin v. Pittsburgh et al. R.R. Co. | 284 (1906) | White | none | none | Ohio | affirmed |
| Nat'l L.S. Bank v. First Nat'l Bank | 296 (1906) | Peckham | none | none | Sup. Ct. Terr. Okla. | affirmed |
| Mercantile T. & D. Co. v. City of Columbus | 311 (1906) | Peckham | none | none | C.C.N.D. Ga. | reversed |
| Security T. & S.V. Co. v. City of Lexington | 323 (1906) | Peckham | none | none | Ky. | affirmed |
| Mississippi R.R. Comm'n v. Illinois C.R.R. Co. | 335 (1906) | Peckham | none | none | 5th Cir. | affirmed |
| Allen v. Riley | 347 (1906) | Peckham | none | none | Kan. | affirmed |
| J. Woods & Sons v. Carl | 358 (1906) | Peckham | none | none | Ark. | affirmed |
| City of Monterey v. Jacks | 360 (1906) | McKenna | none | none | Cal. | affirmed |
| International T. Co. v. Weeks | 364 (1906) | McKenna | none | none | 1st Cir. | affirmed |
| Cruit v. Owen | 368 (1906) | McKenna | none | none | D.C. Cir. | affirmed |
| Offield v. New York et al. R.R. Co. | 372 (1906) | McKenna | none | none | Conn. | affirmed |
| Fair Haven & W.R.R. Co. v. City of New Haven | 379 (1906) | McKenna | none | none | Conn. | affirmed |
| Chattanooga F. & P. Works v. City of Atlanta | 390 (1906) | Holmes | none | none | 6th Cir. | affirmed |
| Guy v. Donald | 399 (1906) | Holmes | none | none | 4th Cir. | certification |
| United States v. Dalcour | 408 (1906) | Holmes | none | none | S.D. Fla. | reversed |
| New York Foundling Hosp. v. Gatti | 429 (1906) | Day | none | none | Sup. Ct. Terr. Ariz. | dismissed |
| Crane v. Buckley | 441 (1906) | Day | none | none | 9th Cir. | affirmed |
| Ex Parte Wisner | 449 (1906) | Fuller | none | none | C.C.E.D. Mo. | mandamus granted |
| United States ex rel. Taylor v. Taft | 461 (1906) | Fuller | none | none | D.C. Cir. | dismissed |
| Gila Valley G.N. Ry. Co. v. Lyon | 465 (1906) | Peckham | none | none | Sup. Ct. Terr. Ariz. | affirmed |
| United States ex rel. Lowry v. Allen | 476 (1906) | McKenna | none | none | D.C. Cir. | affirmed |
| New Jersey v. Anderson | 483 (1906) | Day | none | Harlan | 7th Cir. | reversed |
| Alabama & v. Ry. Co. v. Railroad Comm'n | 496 (1906) | Brewer | none | none | Miss. | affirmed |
| F. Grant S. Co. v. W.M. Laird Co. | 502 (1906) | White | none | none | W.D.N.Y. | dismissed |
| Western Union T. Co. v. Hughes | 505 (1906) | White | none | none | Va. | dismissed |
| Rearick v. Pennsylvania | 507 (1906) | Holmes | none | none | Pa. Super. Ct. | reversed |
| Illinois C.R.R. Co. v. McKendree | 514 (1906) | Day | none | none | Ky. Cir. Ct. | reversed |
| Gatewood v. North Carolina | 531 (1906) | White | none | none | N.C. | affirmed |
| Cahen v. Brewster | 543 (1906) | McKenna | none | none | La. | affirmed |
| Methodist E.C. v. Illinois | 553 (1906) | McKenna | none | none | Ill. | affirmed |
| United States v. Shipp | 563 (1906) | Holmes | none | none | original | trial for contempt |

== See also ==
- Certificate of division
