= Coolidge Park =

Park in Chattanooga, Tennessee, US

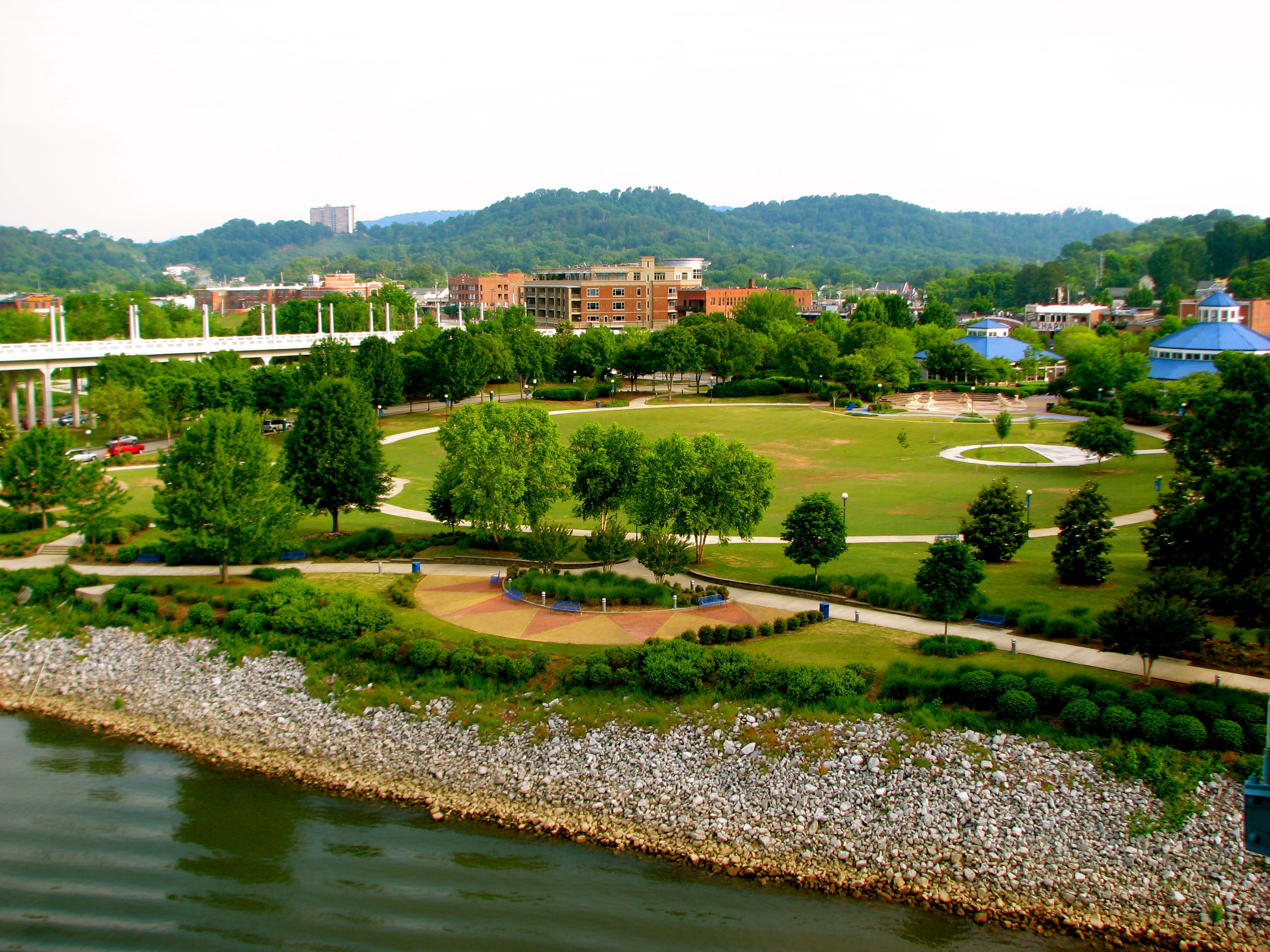
- Interactive map of Coolidge Park
- Location: 150 River St., Chattanooga, Tennessee, United States
- Coordinates: 35.061°N 85.308°W
- Area: 13 acres (0.053 km^{2})
- Created: October 16, 1999
- Website: https://chattanooga.gov/parks/our-parks-and-trails

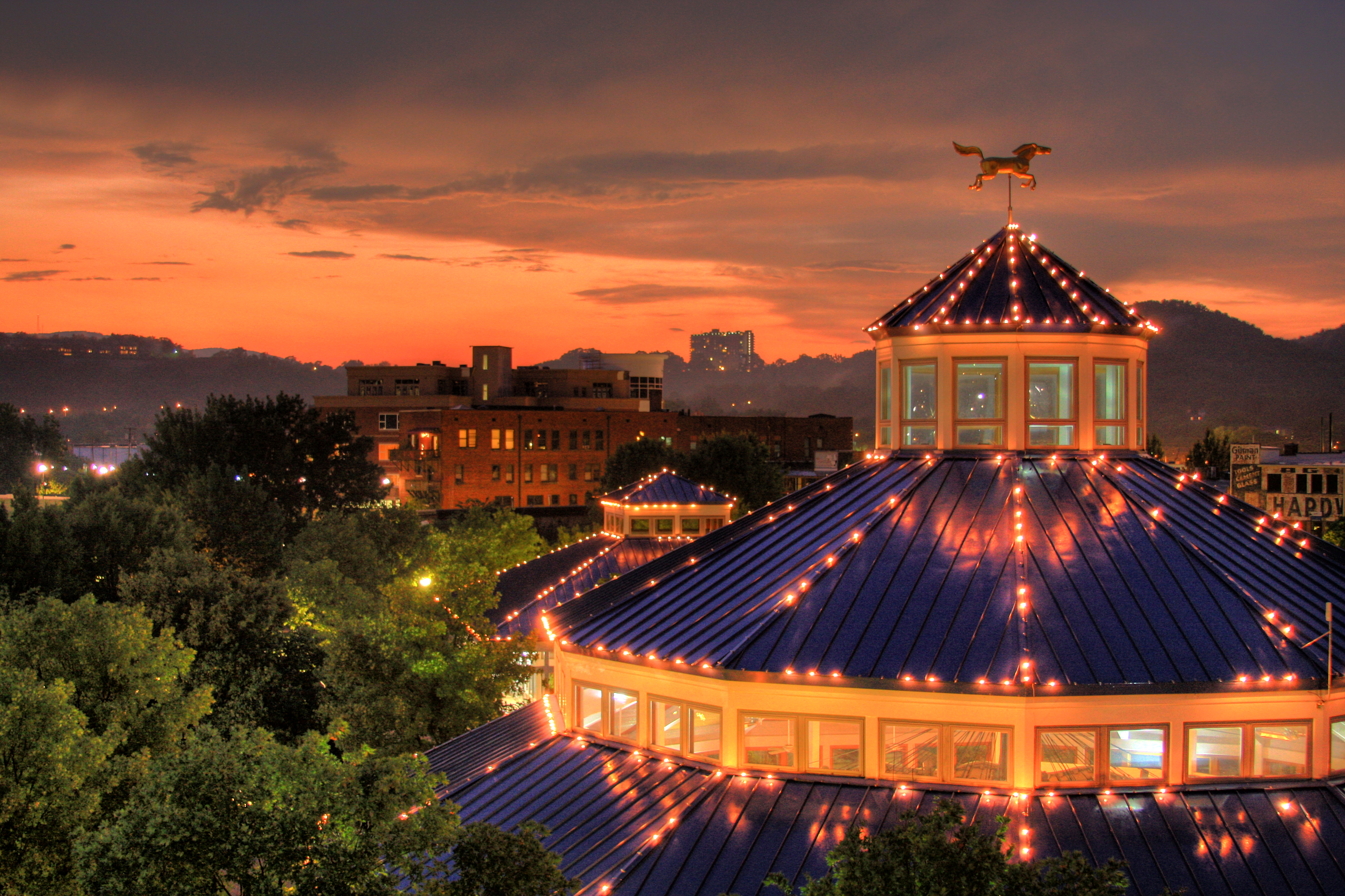
Exterior view of Coolidge Park Carousel at sunset

Coolidge Park is a park located on the North Shore of Chattanooga, Tennessee, along the Tennessee River. It has an interactive water fountain, rock climbing, a pavilion, picnic amenities, a military memorial, and a 100-year old restored antique carousel. There are also docking facilities. It is also near the Walnut Street Bridge. It is also close to the city’s entertainment and art districts. It serves as a venue for concerts, festivals, fundraisers, and special events. The park is also a part of the Tennessee Riverwalk, a 13-mile public waterfront greenway that follows the Tennessee River.

In 2006, a circular landscape of trees representing the sister cities of Chattanooga called the Peace Grove was added to the park. There is also the Learning Walk, a one thousand linear foot-interpretive trail.

The Coolidge Park Carousel is a Dentzel antique carousel from 1894. It has 52 hard-carved animals, a calliope band organ, and gold leaf benches. It is available for reservations.

The park was established through the work of HGOR and the River Front Development Committee. The goal was to have an open space area, stabilize the riverfront area, and increase connectivity with a walkway system, as part of the Tennessee Riverwalk. The park was opened in 1999. The park was named after Charles H. Coolidge, a Medal of Honor recipient who fought in World War II.
