= John Seigenthaler Pedestrian Bridge =

Cumberland River span in Nashville (US)

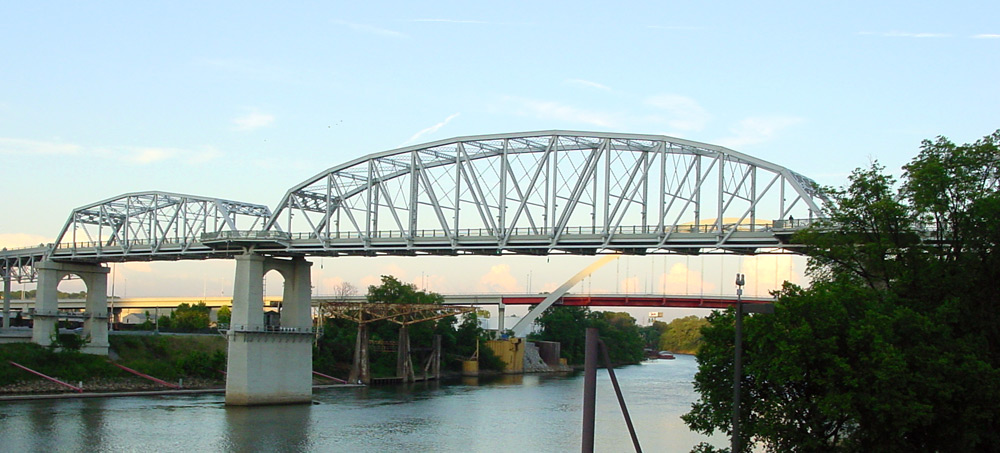
- John Seigenthaler Pedestrian Bridge, seen from Riverfront Park
- Coordinates: 36°9′43″N 86°46′20″W
- Carries: Pedestrians and bicycles
- Crosses: Cumberland River
- Locale: Nashville, Tennessee
- Maintained by: Metropolitan Government of Nashville & Davidson County

Characteristics
- Design: multi-span truss bridge
- Total length: 3,150 feet (960 m)
- Width: 36.4 feet (11.1 m)
- Longest span: 317.8 feet (96.9 m)
- Clearance above: 16 feet (4.9 m)

History
- Opened: July 5, 1909
- Sparkman Street Bridge
- U.S. National Register of Historic Places
- Built: 1907–1909
- NRHP reference No.: 86003237
- Added to NRHP: November 20, 1986

Location
- Interactive map of John Seigenthaler Pedestrian Bridge

The John Seigenthaler Pedestrian Bridge (previously called the Shelby Street Bridge or Shelby Avenue Bridge) is a truss bridge that spans the Cumberland River in Nashville, Tennessee, United States. The bridge spans 3,150 feet (960 m) and is one of the longest pedestrian bridges in the world.

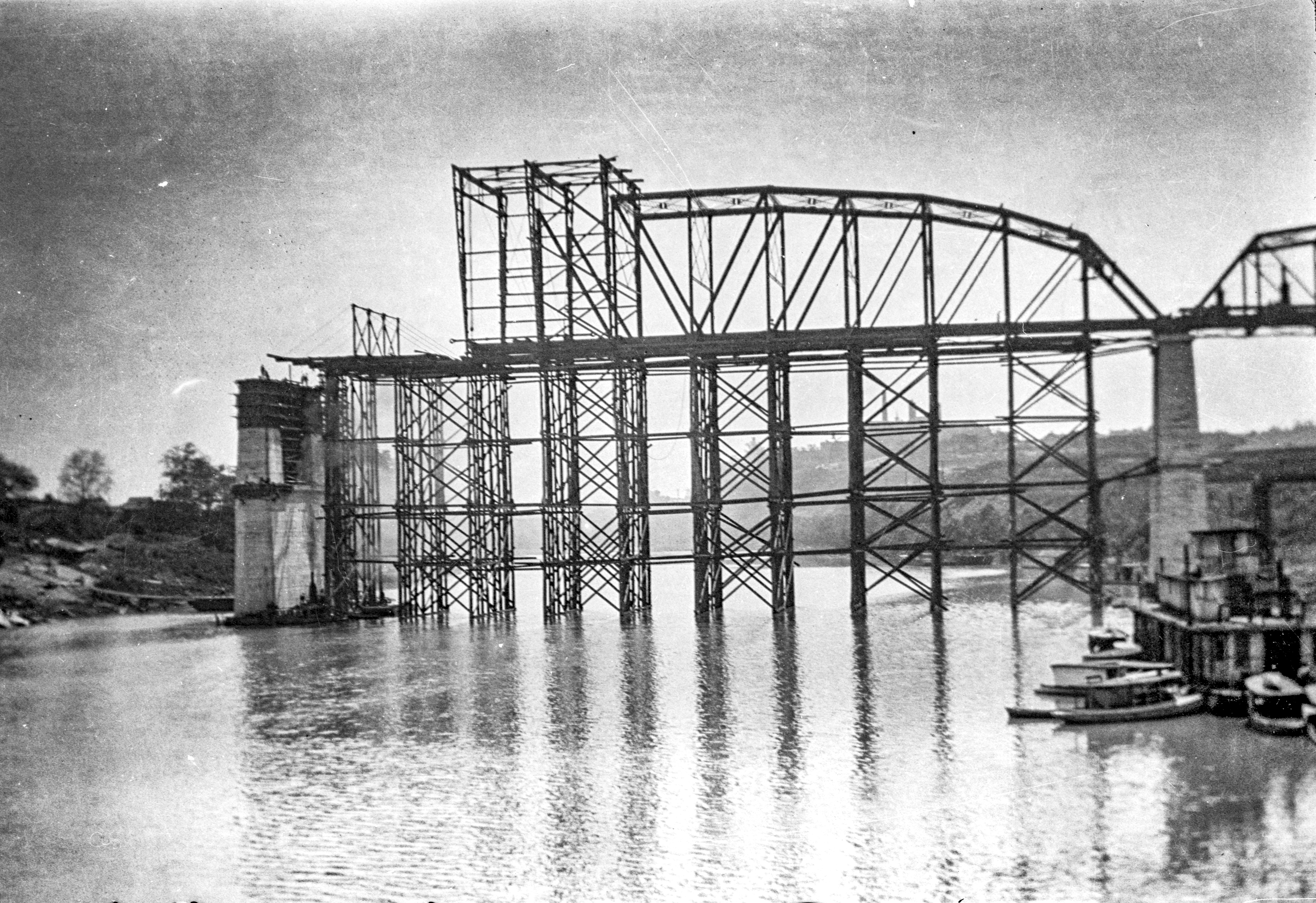
Shelby Street Bridge construction

== Early history ==
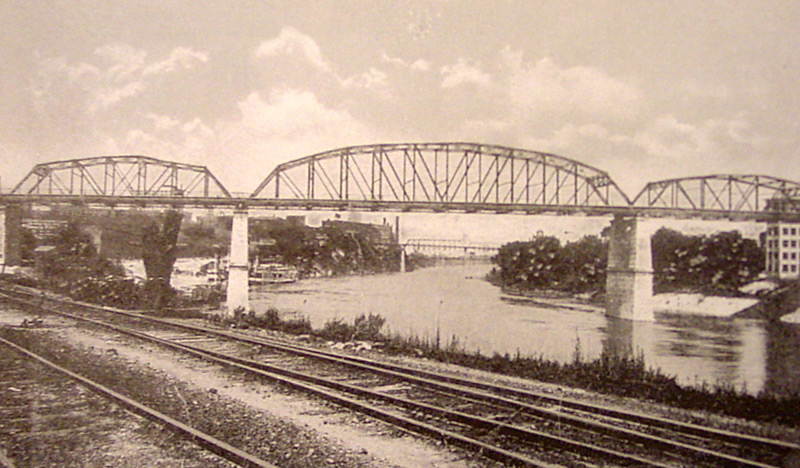
John Seigenthaler Pedestrian Bridge in the 1920s

The John Seigenthaler Pedestrian Bridge was originally known as the Sparkman Street Bridge and was built one block south of Broadway, connecting Sparkman Street and Shelby Avenue. The bridge was constructed at a cost of about $475,000. It opened July 5, 1909. A virtually identical bridge called the Jefferson Street Bridge was built at the same time. The Jefferson Street Bridge was opened a year after the Sparkman Street Bridge. The substructures of the bridges were light grey concrete, and the superstructures were made of steel that had been painted black.

The bridge was the first in North America to have concrete arched trusses.

The bridge was designed and construction was supervised by Howard M. Jones, the chief office engineer of the Nashville, Chattanooga and St. Louis Railway. The original architectural drawings as approved by Jones are archived at the Metro Transportation Offices.

== Repair work ==
After twenty-five years of use, it became apparent that there was something wrong with the concrete on the Sparkman Street Bridge. The worn surfaces of the concrete were chipped away between 1927 and 1930 and replaced with gunite.

Thirty years later, repair work had to be done again. The Standard Engineering Company of Albany, New York was hired to repair the weathered bridge. They subcontracted the steel work to the Nashville Bridge Company. During this repair time, the Jefferson Street Bridge was also repaired.

== National Register of Historic Places ==
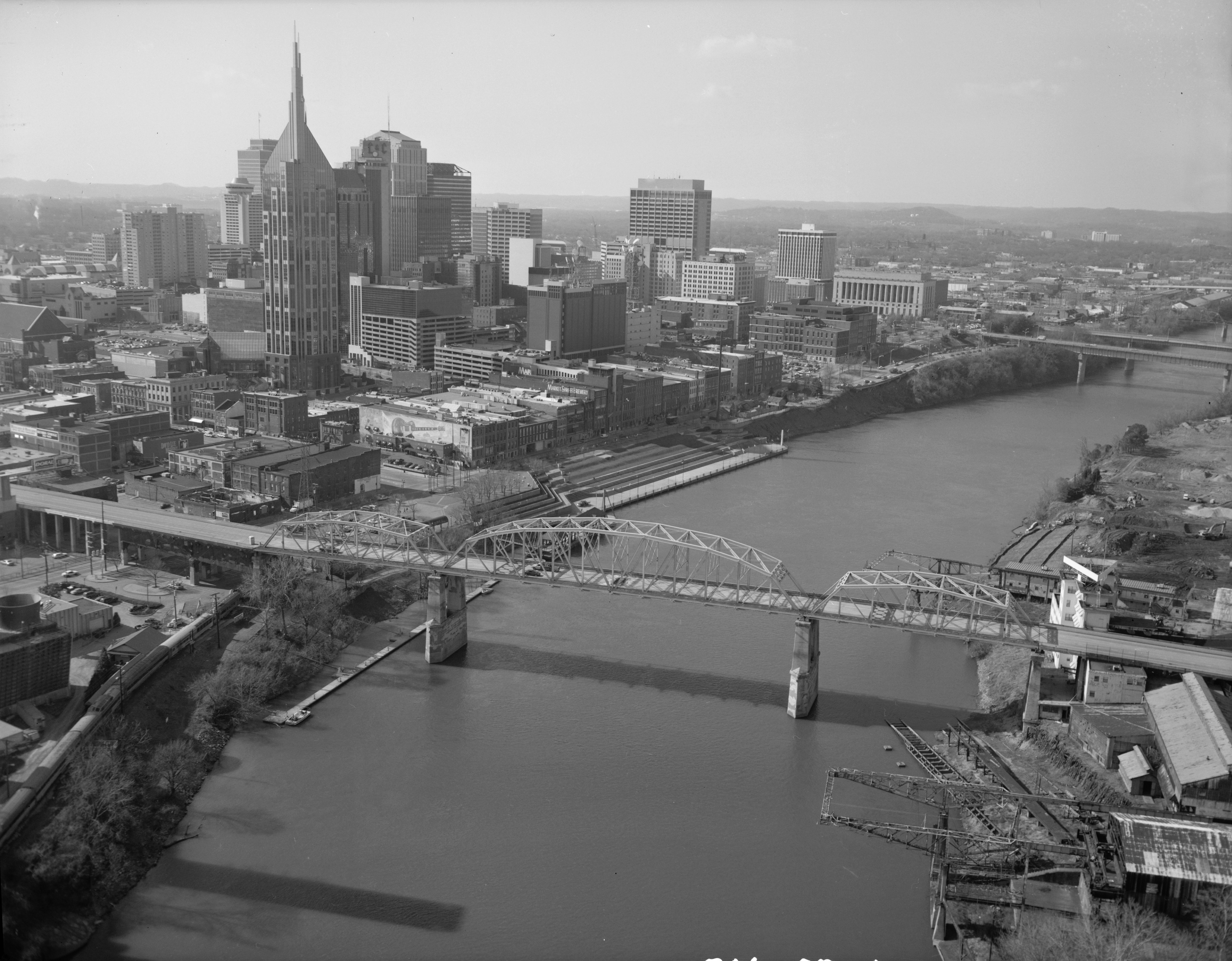
John Seigenthaler Pedestrian Bridge in 1998

In 1998 the John Seigenthaler Pedestrian Bridge was admitted to the National Register of Historic Places, due mainly to the unique truss design. Both the John Seigenthaler Pedestrian Bridge and the Jefferson Street Bridge were considered. The Jefferson Street Bridge was rejected because of its similarity to the John Seigenthaler Pedestrian Bridge and the fact that the John Seigenthaler Pedestrian Bridge was in better condition. The Jefferson Street Bridge was demolished in 1990 to make way for a new bridge that could handle more traffic.

== Closure and reopening ==
State inspectors declared the bridge to be in "poor" condition in 1992, and the bridge was closed to vehicular traffic in 1998. The bridge was originally slated for demolition. However, due to aesthetic, architectural, and historical considerations, it was decided that it should be converted to a pedestrian bridge rather than be demolished. The success of the Walnut Street Bridge as a part of Chattanooga's urban renewal efforts was a major consideration in keeping the bridge.

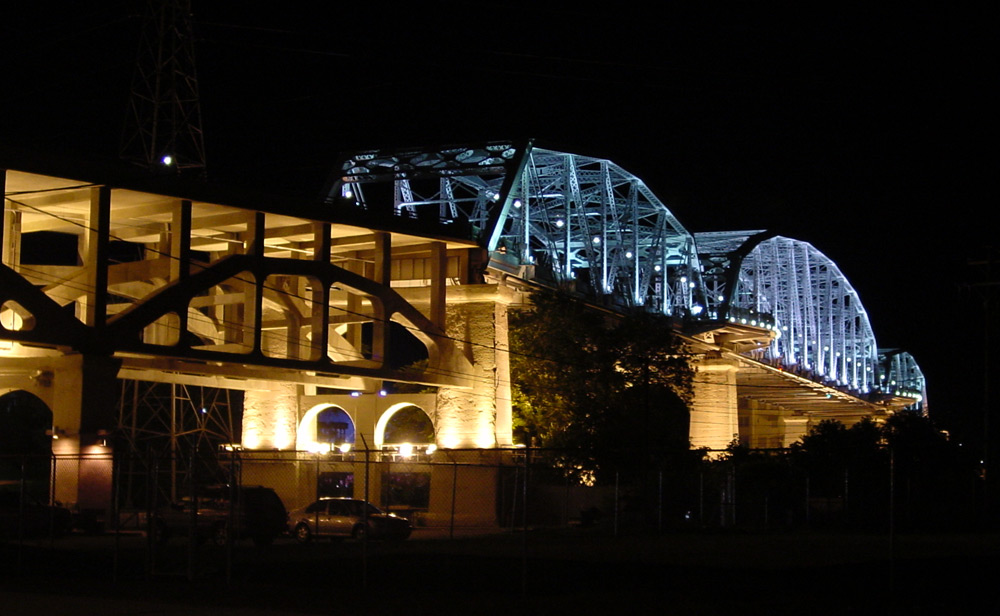
As part of the bridge's renovation for pedestrian use, an extensive new lighting system was installed.

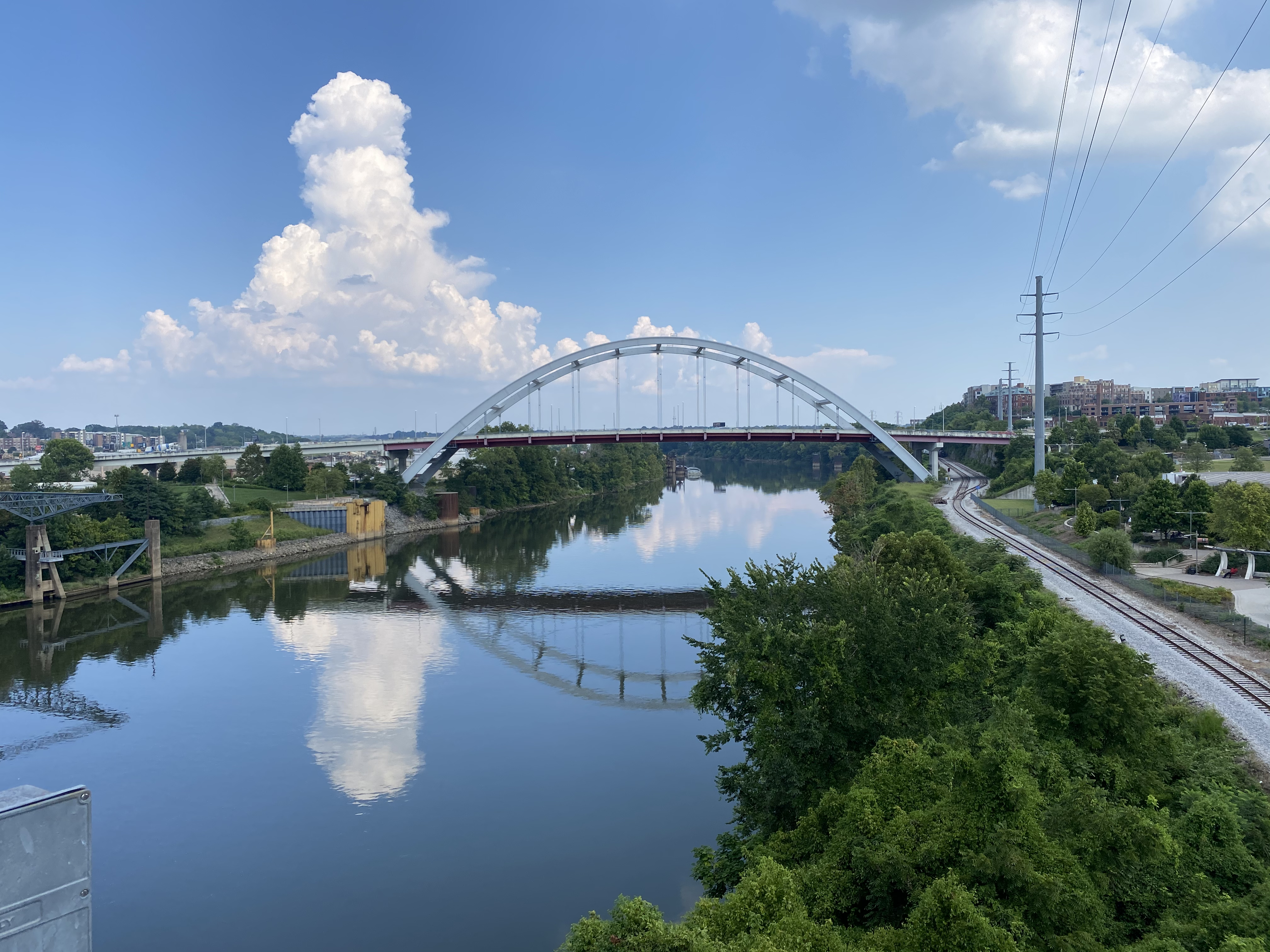
View from the John Seigenthaler Pedestrian Bridge in 2021, overlooking Cumberland River.

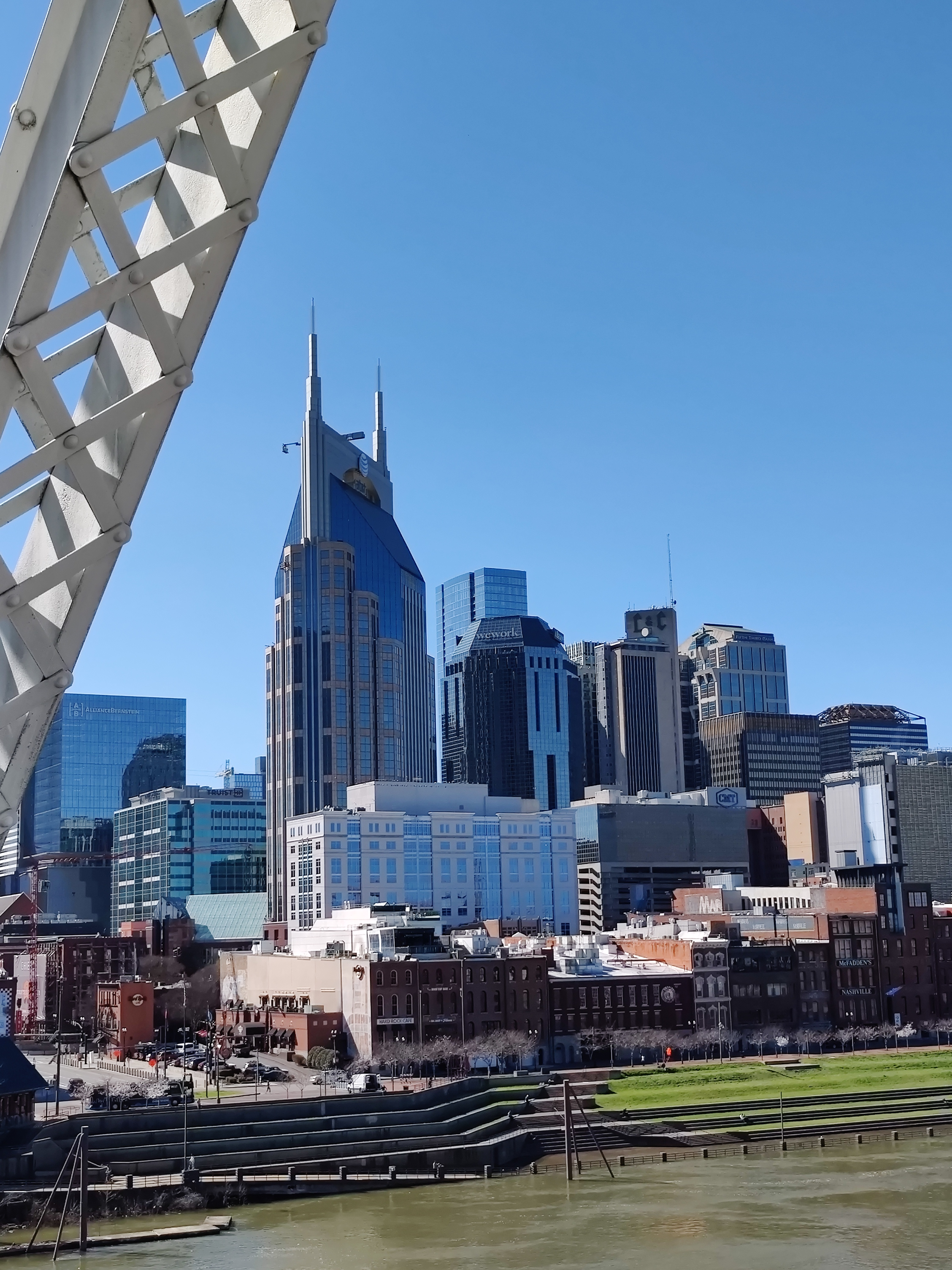
View of downtown Nashville from the John Siegenthaler Pedestrian Bridge.

The bridge was refurbished and includes an elevator, ramps, and stairways. The bridge has a center lane that is 15 feet (4.6 m) across to accommodate bicycles. Originally it was thought that a trolley might use the center lane, but that idea was abandoned in favor of a bicycle lane. On each side of the bicycle lane are 10-foot-wide (3.0 m) elevated boardwalk-style sidewalks. The bridge includes four scenic pedestrian overlooks that, in the metal of the railing, have artistic renderings of the history of life on the Cumberland River. The bridge is dramatically lit at night.

The refurbished bridge is part of the Metro Nashville Greenway system, which is administered by the Parks Department. The eastern terminus includes a pedestrian plaza with special landscaping and is very close to Nissan Stadium. The western terminus comes out facing the Schermerhorn Symphony Center and is very close to the Country Music Hall of Fame, Music City Center, and Bridgestone Arena.

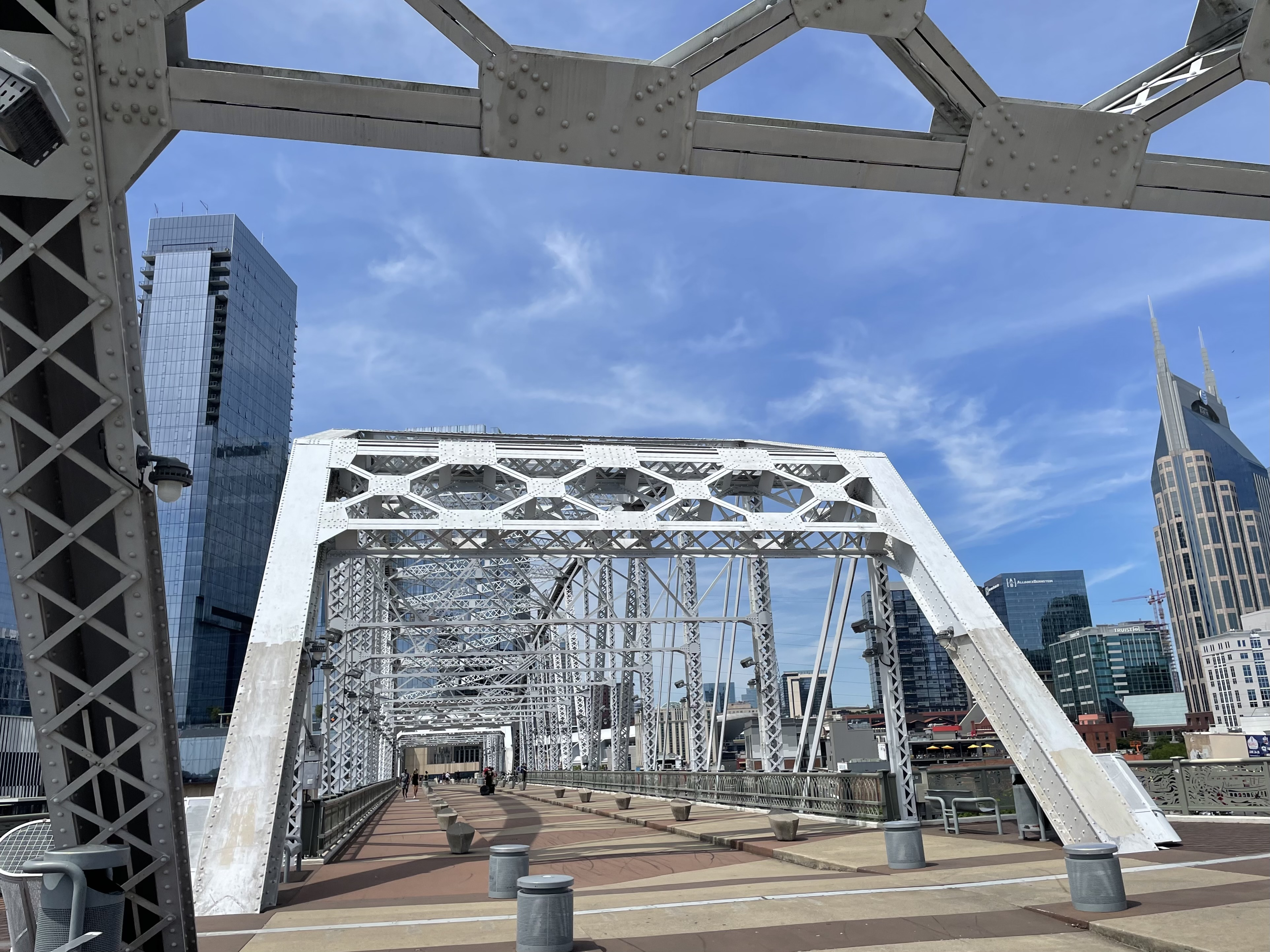
View into downtown from the bridge.

The refurbishment of the bridge cost in excess of $15 million and was done under the supervision and planning of the Tennessee Department of Transportation. A new bridge called the Gateway Bridge, now known as the Korean War Veterans Memorial Bridge, was built to handle the vehicle traffic that used to travel over the John Seigenthaler Pedestrian Bridge.

== Music videos ==
Due to the bridge's iconic status as a Nashville landmark, it is often seen in country music videos. The video for "Save a Horse (Ride a Cowboy)", the first hit single by Big & Rich, was shot entirely on the Shelby Street Bridge. The video for Emerson Drive's 2007 hit single "Moments" was also filmed on and under the bridge. Several scenes from the 2011 video for "Together You and I" by Dolly Parton, and the 2015 video for "Crash and Burn" by Thomas Rhett were filmed on the bridge. Aaron Cole's music video "Yours to Use" was filmed on the bridge at night. While shooting a music video on the bridge, Jon Bon Jovi prevented a woman from committing suicide.

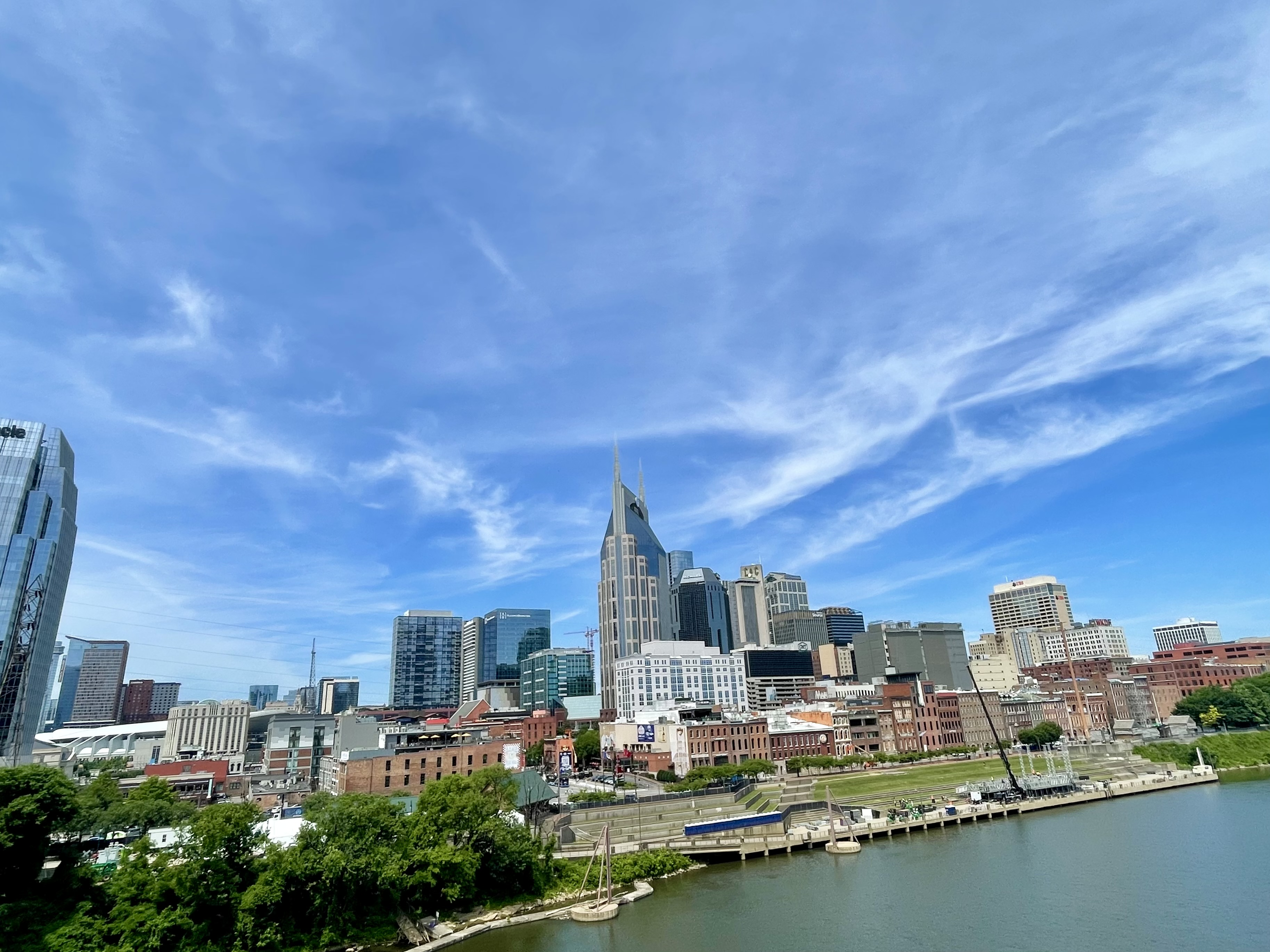
View of the riverfront and downtown from the bridge.

== Renaming ==
In April 2014, the bridge was renamed the John Seigenthaler Pedestrian Bridge in honor of journalist and civil rights advocate John Seigenthaler. While reporting for The Tennessean in the 1950s, Seigenthaler once physically prevented a suicidal man from jumping off the bridge. Ironically, John Seigenthaler is quoted to have said (to his Father Ryan High School classmates), "The Shelby Street Bridge is for the rats to go back home to East Nashville."

== See also ==
- List of bridges documented by the Historic American Engineering Record in Tennessee
