= Northwestern National Life Insurance Co. v. Riggs =

- Supreme Court of the United States

Argued October 18, 1906 Decided December 3, 1906
- Full case name: Northwestern National Life Insurance Co. v. Riggs
- Citations: 203 U.S. 243 (more) 27 S. Ct. 126; 51 L. Ed. 168

Court membership
- Chief Justice Melville Fuller Associate Justices John M. Harlan · David J. Brewer; Edward D. White · Rufus W. Peckham; Joseph McKenna · Oliver W. Holmes Jr. William R. Day

Case opinion
- Majority: Harlan, joined by unanimous

Northwestern National Life Insurance Co. v. Riggs, 203 U.S. 243 (1906), was an important United States Supreme Court case dealing with corporations conducting business and the power of individual states to regulate how corporations may conduct business.

== Facts ==
The conflict within the case involved the payment of a life insurance claim made by Riggs for the estate of Eber B. Roloson against Northwestern National Life Insurance Company, which Northwestern refused to pay saying that the deceased had made false statements concerning his medical history. The state of Missouri had in place a series of legislative acts in the period of 1874 and 1889 that basically created a condition on any life insurance contract in which though medical history information may be inaccurate, if the inaccurate information had no bearing on the manner of the deceased's death then any claim must still be paid. If the inaccurate information did bear on the manner of the deceased's death or if there was a dispute concerning whether the information provided bore on the manner of the deceased's death, then the matter was for a jury to decide whether the claim should be paid.

=== Trial ===
In a jury trial on a claim by Riggs for the estate of Roloson, Northwestern National requested that the jury be instructed that the Missouri statute "was not applicable to this case, and could not be applied to it consistently with the 14th Amendment of the Constitution of the United States". The jury was not so instructed. The trial resulted in a judgment against the defendant, Northwestern National Life Insurance Company.

Northwestern National appealed the judgment with the position the corporation's due process rights under the Fourteenth Amendment had been violated.

Previous Supreme Court decisions had said that liberty "guaranteed by the 14th Amendment against deprivation otherwise than by due process of law embraces the right to pursue a lawful calling and enter into all contracts proper, necessary, and essential to the carrying out of the purposes of such calling." This interpretation of the Fourteenth Amendment had been applied to corporations and individuals. The Court ruled that the Fourteenth Amendment was not a bar to many state laws that effectively limit a corporation's right to contract business so long as such limits were not unreasonable constraints on trade and due process for resolving conflicts and disputes existed.

Northwestern National's arguments were based on the fact that it was, as a corporation, an artificial "person" and hence subject to the protections afforded "persons" under that amendment, an argument which had been and was later used successfully to declare child labor and minimum wage laws unconstitutional.

== Judgment ==
The Court ruled to uphold the application of the Missouri statute, saying:

We take it, then, that the statute, if enforced, cuts off any defense by a life insurance company, based upon false and fraudulent statements in the application, unless the matter misrepresented actually contributed to the death of the insured. Is the statute, therefore, to be held repugnant to the 14th Amendment? Does it, in such case, deprive the insurance company of its 'liberty' or property without due process of law, or deny to it the equal protection of the laws? Although the statute in some degree restricts the company's power of contracting, and is so worded that the beneficiaries of its policy may sometimes reap the fruits of fraud practised upon it by the insured, we cannot, for that reason, hold that the state may not, so far as the Constitution of the United States is concerned, regulate the business of life insurance to the extent indicated. ... [L]ife insurance companies doing business in that state often secured contracts under which they could defeat all recovery upon a policy, and retain all premiums paid by the insured, if it appeared in proof that the application for insurance contained an inaccurate or untrue statement, however innocently made, as to matters having no real or substantial connection whatever with the death of the insured, and which were in no sense material to the risk. This was deemed an evil practice, to be remedied by legislation. ... Surely the state could make such a regulation in relation to its own corporations; for a corporation cannot exert any power, nor make any contract, forbidden by the law of its being. ... That Missouri could forbid life insurance companies of other states from doing any business whatever within its limits, except upon the terms prescribed by the statute in question, cannot be doubted, in view of the decisions of this court. If it could go that far, why may it not declare, as it has in effect done, by this statute, that its provisions shall apply to foreign life insurance companies doing business in Missouri under its license? It would, indeed, be extraordinary if the state could compel its own life insurance companies to respect this statute, but could not enforce its provisions against a foreign corporation doing business within its limits, with its consent, express or implied—-especially against one which, as is the case here, came into the state for purposes of business after such statutory provisions were enacted.

== See also ==
- List of United States Supreme Court cases, volume 203
- Corporate personhood
- Allgeyer v. State of Louisiana (165 U.S. 578) [1897]
- Lake Shore & M. S. R. Co. v. Ohio (173 U.S. 285, 297)
- Powell v. Pennsylvania (127 U.S. 678, 684)
- Adkins v. Children's Hospital (261 U.S. 525) Federal minimum wage for women unconstitutional infringement of contract
- Muller v. Oregon (208 U.S. 412) upheld state restrictions on working hours of women
- West Coast Hotel Co. v. Parrish (300 U.S. 379) upheld constitutionality of minimum wage
