= Caliga v. Inter Ocean Newspaper Co. =

- Supreme Court of the United States

Argued November 5, 1909 Decided November 29, 1909
- Full case name: Caliga v. Inter Ocean Newspaper Co.
- Citations: 215 U.S. 182 (more) 30 S. Ct. 38; 54 L. Ed. 150

Holding
- A person cannot file a second copyright claim to amend the first, not even if the first was determined to be invalid.

Court membership
- Chief Justice Melville Fuller Associate Justices John M. Harlan · David J. Brewer; Edward D. White · Joseph McKenna; Oliver W. Holmes Jr. · William R. Day; William H. Moody

Case opinion
- Majority: Day, joined by unanimous

Caliga v. Inter Ocean Newspaper Co., 215 U.S. 182 (1909), was a United States Supreme Court case in which the Court held a person cannot file a second copyright claim to amend the first, even if the first was determined to be invalid.
