= Lynching of Alfred Blount =

1893 lynching in Chattanooga, Tennessee

On February 9, 1893, Alfred Blount, an African American and a Chattanooga native, was taken from his jail cell in the county jail and brutally beaten, stabbed, and hanged from the Walnut Street Bridge in Chattanooga, Tennessee. Blount was charged with assault of a woman by the name of Mrs. M. A. Moore. Moore, 51 and widowed, claimed she was cleaning her house when a man entered through her back door requesting food. Moore, assuming it was a neighbor of hers, invited the man in and called out to her African-American house boy Sam to bring the man some food. Upon realizing Sam's absence, Moore herself went into the kitchen to prepare food before reporting being grabbed by the arm and attacked by the man. After hitting the man with her hand, Moore fainted and laid unconscious in her house before recalling the incident to her neighbor, Mrs. DeRochement.

Sheriff Skillern sent out a team of searchers to identify and arrest the suspected attacker. Within roughly half an hour of the report, Moore gave a physical description of her attacker and a search began. Blount was arrested shortly thereafter and imprisoned in the county jail.

On the night of Alfred Blount's death, a theater nearby was playing tribute to the Spanish Carmencita. During the opera, several local Chattanooga citizens surrounded the county jail and forcibly entered to Blount's jail cell. With heavy resistance from the on-guard officers, the mob broke open Blount's cell and took him away. Blount then was repeatedly assaulted, including stabbing, physical beating, and shot, on the Walnut Street Bridge before finally being lynched later into the night.

Alfred Blount was the second recorded African American to have been lynched in Chattanooga. Further inquiries show lack of any sufficient evidence for Blount's conviction.

Shortly after Blount's murder on February 9, Attorney General Brown sought to prosecute the mob that hanged Blount. Alongside Attorney General Brown's investigation was Sheriff Skillern, who initially conducted the search for Mrs. Moore's attacker. Eventually, the investigation died out when local Judge Moon decided not to convene a jury.

Following Alfred Blount's lynching, Blount's wife filed a suit against the city of Chattanooga in an effort to prevent further lynchings in the South. Thirteen years after the Alfred Blount lynching, Ed Johnson was hanged from the Walnut Street Bridge for an alleged attack on a woman.

Ed Johnson, like Alfred Blount, was forcibly dragged from his jail cell, beaten, and hanged from Walnut Bridge. Johnson, after over one hundred years was cleared of conviction by Chattanooga District Attorney Bill Cox. Like Blount, later research reveals a lack of sufficient evidence. Johnson was given a stay of execution by Associate Justice of the Supreme Court of the United States John Marshall Harlan just days before his attack and eventual murder.

Some Chattanooga citizens have called for the city to erect plaques memorializing Alfred Blount and Ed Johnson along Walnut Street Bridge. Blount was lynched from the first half of the bridge and Johnson from the latter half.

== See also ==
- False accusations of rape as justification for lynchings
