= List of bridges documented by the Historic American Engineering Record in Tennessee =

This is a list of bridges documented by the Historic American Engineering Record in the U.S. state of Tennessee.

== Bridges ==
Survey No.	Name (as assigned by HAER)	Status	Type	Built	Documented	Carries	Crosses	Location	County	Coordinates
TN-2	Massengill Bridge	Replaced	Parker truss	1916	1982	Coal Creek Road	Clinch River	Norris	Anderson	36°12′26.9″N 84°06′31.6″W
TN-3	Moore Road Bridge	Replaced	Pratt truss	1904	1983	Moore Road	North Fork Creek	Unionville	Bedford	35°35′23″N 86°34′56″W
TN-4	McPherson Bridge	Replaced	Pratt truss	1895	1983	County Road A165	Candies Creek	Eureka	Bradley	35°16′04.4″N 84°50′59.5″W
TN-5	Dentville Road Bridge	Replaced	Parker truss	1911	1983	Dentville Road	Hiwassee River	Benton	Polk	35°12′18″N 84°39′18″W
TN-6	Weaver Road Bridge	Replaced	Pratt truss	1898	1983	County Road A323 (Weaver Road)	Paint Rock Creek	Kingston	Roane	35°43′55″N 84°30′34″W
TN-7	Riverside Bridge	Replaced	Pratt truss	1913	1983	Weaver Road	Holston River south fork	Bluff City	Sullivan	36°29′12″N 82°11′43″W
TN-11	Walnut Street Bridge	Extant	Parker truss	1890	1979	Market Street	Tennessee River	Chattanooga	Hamilton	35°03′29″N 85°18′26″W
TN-14	Memphis Bridge (Note: See also HAER No. NE-2, "Nebraska City Bridge" for additional documentation)	Extant	Cantilever	1892	1985	BNSF Railway	Mississippi River	Memphis, Tennessee, and West Memphis, Arkansas	Shelby County, Tennessee, and Crittenden County, Arkansas	35°07′43″N 90°04′35″W
TN-15	Newsom's Mill Bridge	Replaced	Warren truss	1904	1985	Newsom's Station Road	Harpeth River	Nashville	Davidson	36°04′51″N 86°59′51″W
TN-16	Lenox Bridge	Demolished	Swing span	1917	1985	Rural Road S8025	Obion River	Lenox	Dyer	36°05′33″N 89°31′58″W
TN-17	Boulevard Bridge	Replaced	Pratt truss	1909	1984	Old Dechard-Winchester Road	Wagner Creek	Decherd and Winchester	Franklin	35°12′05″N 86°05′30″W
TN-18	Buena Vista Ford Bridge	Replaced	Pratt truss	1907	1985	McClanahan Road	Round Lick Creek	Carthage	Smith	36°11′05″N 86°04′48″W
TN-19	Gibson Bridge	Replaced	Pennsylvania truss	1916	1985	Herb Hodge Road	Watauga River	Watauga	Washington	36°23′03″N 82°19′11″W
TN-20	Coldwater Bridge	Replaced	Warren truss	1889	1985	SR 274 (Old Railroad Bed Road)	Coldwater Creek	Fayetteville	Lincoln	35°05′02″N 86°43′59″W
TN-21	John T. Cunningham Memorial Bridge	Replaced	K-truss	1925	1985	SR 13 / SR 48 (former)	Cumberland River	Clarksville	Montgomery	36°30′10″N 87°22′43″W
TN-23	Hobbs Bridge	Bypassed	Baltimore truss	1891	1986	Curtis Road (A494)	Elk River	Coldwater	Lincoln	35°05′57″N 86°44′34″W
TN-24	Powder Springs Bridge	Replaced	Pratt truss	1909	1986	Dale Road (A051)	Flat Creek	Powder Springs	Grainger	36°15′11″N 83°40′09″W
TN-25	Chestoa Bridge	Replaced	Reinforced concrete closed-spandrel arch	1916	1986	Chestoa Pike (A068)	Nolichucky River	Chestoa	Unicoi	36°06′20″N 82°26′52″W
TN-26	Dobbs Ford Bridge	Replaced	Pratt truss	1877	1989	Old Harrison Pike	Candies Creek	Cleveland and Prospect	Bradley	35°10′22″N 84°54′20″W
TN-27	Sulphur Fork Creek Bridge	Extant	Pratt truss	1890	1988	Old Clarksville-Springfield Road (A456)	Sulphur Fork Creek	Port Royal	Montgomery	36°33′15.1″N 87°08′25.4″W
TN-28	Austin Peay Bridge	Replaced	K-truss	1928	1990	SR 56 / SR 85	Cumberland River	Gainesboro	Jackson	36°22′26″N 85°39′09″W
TN-29	Asylum Avenue Viaduct	Replaced	Viaduct	1909	1992	SR 62 (Western Avenue)	Second Creek and Southern Railway	Knoxville	Knox	35°57′53″N 83°55′35″W
TN-30	Campbell's Levee Bridge	Replaced	Warren truss	1921	1992	Westover Road	South Fork of the Forked Deer River	Jackson	Madison	35°37′03″N 88°51′07″W
TN-31	Marlow Road Bridge	Replaced	King post truss	1918	1988	Marlow Road	CSX Transportation	Clinton	Anderson	36°04′03″N 84°13′40″W
TN-32	Reliance Bridge	Replaced	Pratt truss	1912	1984	SR 315	Hiwassee River	Reliance	Polk	35°11′22″N 84°30′08″W
TN-33	Old Emory River Bridge	Replaced	Reinforced concrete closed-spandrel arch	1918	1989	US 27	Emory River	Harriman	Roane	35°55′38″N 84°33′05″W
TN-34	Hassler Bridge	Replaced	Parker truss	1947	1993	SR 42	Obey River	Byrdstown	Pickett	36°32′03″N 85°09′38″W
TN-35	Great Smoky Mountains National Park Roads & Bridges				1996			Gatlinburg	Sevier	
TN-35-Q	Great Smoky Mountains National Park Roads & Bridges, The Loop Over Bridge	Extant	Reinforced concrete closed-spandrel arch	1935	1996	US 441 (Newfound Gap Road)	US 441 (Newfound Gap Road)	Gatlinburg	Sevier	35°38′06″N 83°27′58″W
TN-35-R	Great Smoky Mountains National Park Roads & Bridges, Smokemont Bridge	Extant	Timber stringer	1959	1996	Smokemont Campground entrance road	Oconaluftee River	Gatlinburg	Sevier	35°33′11″N 83°18′34″W
TN-35-S	Great Smoky Mountains National Park Roads & Bridges, Elkmont Vehicle Bridge	Extant	Reinforced concrete closed-spandrel arch	1937	1996	Little River Road	Little River	Gatlinburg	Sevier	35°39′17″N 83°34′50″W
TN-35-T	Great Smoky Mountains National Park Roads & Bridges, Luten Bridges	Extant	Reinforced concrete closed-spandrel arch	1921	1996	Enloe Floyd Bottoms Road	Oconaluftee River, Raven Fork	Gatlinburg	Sevier	35°30′49″N 83°17′57″W
TN-38	Sparkman Street Bridge	Extant	Reinforced concrete truss	1909	1998	Shelby Avenue	Cumberland River	Nashville	Davidson	36°09′43″N 86°46′20″W
TN-39	Scott Fitzhugh Bridge	Replaced	Parker truss	1929	1987	US 79 / SR 76	Tennessee River	Paris and Dover	Henry and Stewart	36°26′40″N 88°03′38″W
TN-40	Lea Bridge	Replaced	Pratt truss	1886	1987	Old Georgetown Road	Candies Creek	Hopewell	Bradley	35°13′23″N 84°52′44″W
TN-41	Doe River Bridge	Extant	Howe truss	1882	2003	Third Avenue	Doe River	Elizabethton	Carter	36°20′50″N 82°12′42″W
TN-42	Bridge No. 33.3		Pratt truss	1910	1987	Railroad	Elk River	Fayetteville	Lincoln	
TN-43	Bridge No. 2.4	Demolished	Warren truss	1914	1987	Railroad	Boiling Fork Creek	Decherd	Franklin	35°11′14.8″N 86°06′16.8″W
TN-44	Liberty Bridge	Replaced	Warren truss	1908	1987	City Road	Smith Fork Creek	Liberty	DeKalb	36°00′31″N 85°57′42″W
TN-46	Cowley Bridge	Extant	Bowstring arch truss	1878		Stephens Creek Road	Elk River	Kelso	Lincoln	35°08′17″N 86°28′06″W
TN-48	Nashville Toll Bridge (Abutments)	Ruins		1823	2015	Trail of Tears	Cumberland River	Nashville	Davidson	36°10′05″N 86°46′37″W
