= Lynching of Ed Johnson =

African American who was lynched in the U.S.

Coordinates: 35.05784°N 85.30739°W

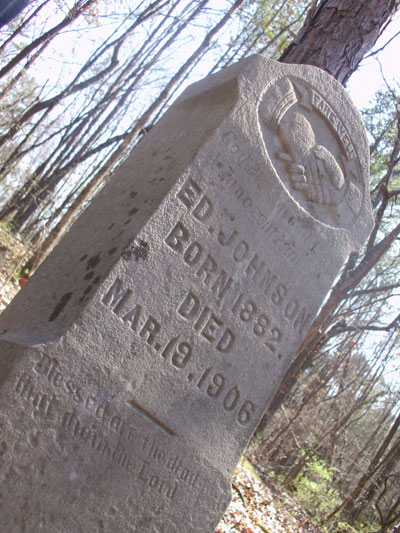
The grave marker of Ed Johnson.

On March 19, 1906, Ed Johnson, a young African American man, was murdered by a lynch mob in his home town of Chattanooga, Tennessee. He had been sentenced to death for the rape of Nevada Taylor, but Justice John Marshall Harlan of the United States Supreme Court had issued a stay of execution. To prevent delay or avoidance of execution, a mob broke into the jail where Johnson was held, abducted him, and lynched him from the Walnut Street Bridge.

During Johnson's incarceration there was much public interest in the case, and many people, including court officers, feared a possible lynch attempt. The day after his murder saw widespread strikes among the black community in Chattanooga. Two thousand people attended his funeral the following day.

After the murder, President Theodore Roosevelt made it his goal to have the members of the mob imprisoned by directing the Secret Service to participate in the investigation. Hamilton County Sheriff Joseph F. Shipp, who had arrested Johnson, and 24 others were charged with contempt of court in United States v. Shipp, the only criminal trial ever held by the United States Supreme Court. Shipp and five others were eventually found guilty, receiving sentence

Johnson, while in jail, made a Christian profession and was baptized. He publicly forgave those who were about to execute him. On the top of Johnson's tombstone are his final words "God Bless you all. I AM A Innocent Man." On the bottom is written "Blessed are the dead that die in the Lord". Johnson was the second African American to be lynched on Walnut Street Bridge. Alfred Blount was the first, thirteen years earlier, in 1893.

Johnson's conviction was posthumously vacated in 2000, after a judge ruled that his right to a fair trial had been violated.

== Rape and trial ==
During December 1905, the Chattanooga area experienced what a local newspaper referred to as a black "crime wave". Between December 11 and 23, black suspects allegedly committed one rape, one assault, and one assault and burglary. On Christmas Eve, a black gambler named Floyd Westfield shot and killed Chattanooga constable Alonzo Rains, and on Christmas Day, police received reports of eight robberies or assaults committed by black suspects. In each instance, the victim was white. Police arrested several suspects for these crimes, including Westfield, who admitted to killing the constable; Chattanooga residents made no attempts to lynch the alleged criminals.

On February 4, 1906, Westfield, who claimed that he killed Constable Rains in self-defense, was convicted of first degree murder and sentenced to death. However, he was granted a new trial by the Tennessee Supreme Court, which found that a lesser conviction was more appropriate. Westfield's second trial ended in a hung jury, with one juror favoring a second degree murder conviction, one juror favoring a manslaughter conviction, and two jurors favoring an acquittal. The third trial resulted in Westfield again being convicted of first degree murder and having his death sentence reinstated. However, the Tennessee Supreme Court again overturned his conviction, finding that the facts of the case did not warrant a first degree murder conviction. At his fourth trial, the prosecution chose to only try Westfield for manslaughter. On February 25, 1908, Westfield was acquitted and released from custody. It was determined that Constable Rains was abusive and had attacked Westfield, who had committed no crime, without any lawful justification.

Constable Rains was courting Miss Hattie Fox, a local school teacher, and had become enraged by the noise being made from a nearby party at the home of Westfield's grandmother, where firecrackers and Roman candles were being set. Even as his own friends tried to dissuade him, Rains attacked Westfield's grandmother's house, firing a shot through the door with his pistol. In response, Westfield shot and killed him.

Nevertheless, as news of the alleged crime wave spread, racial fear and tension in the city dramatically increased.

The Ed Johnson case occurred within this atmosphere of heightened racial fear. On January 23, 1906, Nevada Taylor was attacked while walking home from a streetcar stop to the cottage at the Chattanooga Forest Hills Cemetery, which she shared with her father, the cemetery's caretaker. She lost consciousness during the attack, and afterwards could remember little beyond the fact that her assailant had been a black man who approached her from behind and wrapped a leather strap around her neck. A doctor who examined her shortly after the attack determined that she had been sexually assaulted.

The search for her attacker was led by Hamilton County Sheriff Shipp. The morning after the attack, he arrested James Broaden, a black man fitting Taylor's description of her attacker who worked in the area. The next day, he arrested Ed Johnson after receiving a report that he had been witnessed holding a leather strap near the streetcar stop on the night of the attack.

On the night that Johnson was arrested, a mob of 1500 white Chattanooga metropolitan residents surrounded the prison and demanded that Johnson be handed over to them, along with Westfield and another black man accused of capital crimes. Anticipating such an attempt and desiring to protect the prisoner, Sheriff Shipp and Hamilton County Judge Samuel D. McReynolds had evacuated Broaden and Johnson to Nashville, Tennessee, earlier that day to await trial. McReynolds spoke to the mob and promised swift justice through the legal system. Other local business leaders also spoke. The mob reluctantly dispersed, but not before causing significant damage to the jailhouse doors.

=== Jury decision ===
Johnson was indicted by grand jury on January 26. Johnson was returned to Chattanooga for his trial, which began on February 6 with Judge McReynolds presiding. During the trial, Taylor said that she recognized Johnson as the man who assaulted her by his voice, face, and size, as well as a hat he had worn on the night of the attack and again in the Nashville jail where she had been brought to identify him. However, Miss Taylor repeatedly refused to swear that he was the assailant, stating instead that it was her belief that Johnson was the assailant. During Taylor's testimony, one of the jurors leaped out of his seat and had to be restrained from attacking Johnson.

Johnson's defense presented thirteen witnesses who swore they had seen Johnson at the Last Chance Saloon, where he worked as a porter, at around the time Nevada Taylor had been raped. The defense also worked to undermine the testimony of Will Hixson, who had allegedly seen Johnson in the area twirling a leather strap a few minutes before the rape, calling a witness named Harvey McConnell who testified that Hixson had gotten Johnson's name and physical description from him before going to the police. The defense implied that Hixson had falsely accused Johnson in order to collect the $375 reward for information.

The jury was split with eight favoring conviction whereas four favoring acquittal.

The trial concluded three days later with Johnson's conviction; he was sentenced to be put to death on March 13. His defense attorneys considered the possibility of an appeal but decided against it, believing that it would be unlikely to succeed and, in any case, an acquittal might incense the public to try another storming of the jail, killing Johnson possibly along with other prisoners.

== Appeals ==
Although Johnson's court-appointed attorneys had decided not to pursue appeal, two local black attorneys, Noah Parden and Styles Hutchins, took up the case and requested an appeal to McReynolds on February 12. This was denied, as was their subsequent request to the Tennessee Supreme Court. On March 2, the same day as the unfavorable Tennessee Supreme Court ruling, Parden filed a petition for a writ of habeas corpus with the United States circuit court at Knoxville, Tennessee, arguing that Johnson's trial deprived him of rights guaranteed by the U.S. Constitution. This move was highly unusual, since federal courts were traditionally held to have no jurisdiction over state criminal proceedings. A District Court Judge, Charles Dickens Clark, dismissed the petition on these grounds on March 10; however, he suggested in his ruling that Parden petition the governor of Tennessee for a 10-day stay of execution, allowing time for an appeal of the District Court's decision. A stay was granted by Democratic governor John I. Cox, moving the scheduled execution date to March 20.

Parden used this stay to travel to Washington, D.C., where he met on March 17 with U.S. Supreme Court Justice John Marshall Harlan, who was also the circuit judge of the Sixth Circuit which contains Tennessee. Harlan agreed to have the Supreme Court hear the appeal, and on March 19, the Supreme Court ordered a second stay in order to allow this.

== Lynching ==
Johnson was murdered on the evening of March 19. Although multiple deputies usually guarded the prison each night and Sheriff Shipp's chief deputy recommended that extra guards be posted around the jail to prevent mob violence, Shipp excused all law enforcement officials, except for elderly nighttime jailer Jeremiah Gibson, from duty. Additionally, the deputies moved all prisoners except Ed Johnson and Ellen Baker, a white woman, from the third floor. A group of men entered the virtually unguarded jail between 8:30 and 9:00 pm and broke through a set of three third-floor doors using an axe and a sledgehammer, which took nearly three hours. During this time Shipp arrived at the jail and pleaded with the mob to cease their violence and allow the rule of law to remain in effect. He did not draw his revolver or attempt to physically restrain any member of the mob. When the mob became annoyed at Shipp's protests, several members escorted him to a bathroom and instructed him to remain there. Though the mob left Shipp unguarded, he did not attempt to leave until the lynching concluded. They then took Johnson to the nearby Walnut Street Bridge, and hanged him with a rope hung over a beam. After Johnson had been hanging for over two minutes, several lynchers grew impatient and began shooting him. According to one report, he was hit by over fifty bullets. One bullet severed the rope, and Johnson fell to the ground. When Johnson moved, one member of the mob, later identified as a deputy sheriff, placed his revolver against Johnson's head and fired five additional shots. Following this act, another leader of the mob pinned a note to Johnson, which read "To Justice Harlan. Come get your nigger now." Around a dozen men, believed to include some of Shipp's deputies, were actively involved in the lynching, while more spectators gathered around the jail and followed the lynchers to the bridge. The use of the bridge was to act as a deterrent to the city's blacks who resided on the opposite side of the bridge and who crossed it daily to go to and from their jobs in the downtown Chattanooga area.

== Aftermath ==
The mob's actions, especially the note addressed to Justice Harlan and Chattanooga law enforcement's lack of prevention or response, directly challenged the Supreme Court's authority over state criminal proceedings. In a Birmingham News interview following the lynching, Sheriff Shipp explicitly blamed Ed Johnson's death on the Supreme Court's interference. As a result, the lynching of Ed Johnson led to United States v. Shipp, the only criminal trial ever held by the United States Supreme Court. Twenty-five people were charged with contempt of court, albeit the charges were eventually dropped for all but nine men: Sheriff Joseph F. Shipp, deputies Matthew Galloway and Jeremiah Gibson, and Nick Nolan, William Mayes, Henry Padgett, Alf Handman, Bart Justice, and Luther Williams, all of whom were accused of being members of the lynch mob. The defendants were tried for contempt of court, which carried a maximum sentence of 180 days in prison. During the trial, testimony showed that Nolan had adjusted the noose around Johnson's neck, and Luther Williams had fired five shots into Johnson's body.

In May 1909, Shipp, Williams, Nolan, Gibson, Padgett and Mayes were found guilty. Galloway, Handman, and Justice were acquitted. Those convicted all filed petitions for a rehearing, which was denied. On November 15, 1909, the Supreme Court imposed the sentences. Shipp, Williams, and Nolan were each sentenced to 90 days in prison, while Gibson, Padgett, and Mayes were each sentenced to 60 days in prison. In the court's words, "Shipp not only made the work of the mob easy, but in effect aided and abetted it." However, when Shipp was released he still swore innocence and was welcomed back as a hero. Threatened with violence, Johnson's two black lawyers had to leave the state, never to return.

The trial occurred during the nadir of American race relations, taking place one year after the highly-publicized Springfield race riot of 1908, and one year before the Johnson–Jeffries riots broke out in dozens of cities across the United States. Ninety-four years after the lynching, in February 2000, Hamilton County Criminal Judge Doug Meyer overturned Johnson's conviction after hearing arguments that Johnson did not receive a fair trial because of the all-white jury and the judge's refusal to move the trial from Chattanooga, where there was much publicity about the case. On September 19, 2021, a memorial to Ed Johnson was dedicated near the site of the lynching.

== See also ==
- List of wrongful convictions in the United States
- False accusations of rape as justification for lynchings
