= United States v. Shipp =

- Supreme Court of the United States

Argued December 4–5, 1906 Decided December 24, 1906
- Full case name: United States v. John F. Shipp, et al.
- Citations: 203 U.S. 563 (more) 27 S. Ct. 165; 51 L. Ed. 319

Holding
- Six defendants found guilty of contempt of court (the Supreme Court).

Court membership
- Chief Justice Melville Fuller Associate Justices John M. Harlan · David J. Brewer; Edward D. White · Rufus W. Peckham; Joseph McKenna · Oliver W. Holmes Jr. William R. Day · William H. Moody

Case opinions
- Majority: Holmes, joined by Fuller, Harlan, Brewer, Day
- Dissent: Peckham, joined by White, McKenna
- Moody took no part in the consideration or decision of the case.

United States v. Shipp, 203 U.S. 563 (1906) (along with decisions at 214 U.S. 386 (1909), and 215 U.S. 580 (1909)), were rulings of the Supreme Court of the United States with regard to Sheriff Joseph F. Shipp and five others of Chattanooga, Tennessee, having "in effect aided and abetted" the lynching of Ed Johnson. They were held in contempt of court and sentenced to imprisonment. It remains the only criminal trial in the history of the Supreme Court.

== Background ==
Ed Johnson, a black man, had been convicted in Hamilton County, Tennessee, of the rape of a white woman on February 11, 1906, and sentenced to death. On March 3, 1906, Johnson's lawyer Noah W. Parden filed a writ of habeas corpus, alleging that his constitutional rights had been violated. Specifically, Parden alleged that all blacks had been systematically excluded from both the grand jury considering the original indictment against him and the trial jury considering his case. He further argued that he had been substantively denied the right to counsel, as his lawyer at the time had been too intimidated by the threats of mob violence to file motions for a change of venue, a continuance, or a new trial, all of which could be reasonably expected under the circumstances. Parden asserted Johnson was thus about to be deprived of his life without due process.

Parden's petition was initially denied on March 10, 1906, and Johnson was remanded to the custody of Hamilton County Sheriff Joseph F. Shipp, with the stipulation for Johnson to be given 10 days to file further appeals. His appeal to the Supreme Court was granted by Justice Harlan on March 17 and subsequently by the entire Court on March 19. However, despite being advised of the ruling by telegram on that date and the case and the ruling being given full coverage by Chattanooga's evening newspapers that day, Shipp and his chief jailer nonetheless allowed a mob to enter the Hamilton County Jail and to lynch Johnson on the city's Walnut Street Bridge.

Shipp's actions resulted in his prosecution by the US Department of Justice. Included as defendants were his chief jailer and the members of the lynch mob who could be reasonably identified. When the case came to the Supreme Court, the government was represented by both Solicitor General Henry M. Hoyt and Attorney General William H. Moody. Shipp's attorneys argued that the Supreme Court was not competent to hear the case, as it was now a party to the case in that it was involved in the action as a plaintiff rather than as a Court.

== Holding ==
The Supreme Court decided that the action constituted contempt of court in that Sheriff Shipp, with full knowledge of the Court's ruling, chose to ignore his duties to protect a prisoner in his care. In a decision written by Justice Holmes, the Court held that it was not a party in any sense that would create a conflict of interest, as members of the Court were not affected by Shipp's actions in any way in their persons (Shipp's actions were not a threat to the justices personally, but to their ruling and the authority of the Court) and so they were not "interested parties" in any sense that would affect their competence with regard to the case. The prosecution of Shipp was allowed to proceed.

== Impact ==
The case took on special significance as the only criminal trial of the Supreme Court in its entire history. The main impact of the case was its reiteration of the principle that the Supreme Court could always intervene in state capital cases, if there was a question of a violation of the constitutional right to due process.

Twenty-five people were charged with contempt of court, albeit the charges were eventually dropped for all but nine men: Sheriff Joseph F. Shipp, deputies Matthew Galloway and Jeremiah Gibson, and Nick Nolan, William Mayes, Henry Padgett, Alf Handman, Bart Justice, and Luther Williams, all of whom were accused of being members of the lynch mob. During the trial, testimony showed that Nolan had adjusted the noose around Johnson's neck, and Luther Williams had fired five shots into Johnson's body. In May 1909, Shipp, Williams, Nolan, Gibson, Padgett and Mayes were found guilty. Galloway, Handman, and Justice were acquitted. Those convicted all filed petitions for a rehearing, which were denied. On November 15, 1909, the Supreme Court imposed the sentences. Shipp, Williams, and Nolan were each sentenced to 90 days in prison, while Gibson, Padgett, and Mayes were each sentenced to 60 days in prison. The charge had carried a maximum sentence of 180 days in prison. In the Court's words, "Shipp not only made the work of the mob easy, but in effect aided and abetted it." However, when Shipp was released he still swore innocence and was welcomed back as a hero. Threatened with violence, Johnson's two black lawyers had to leave the state, never to return.

== Commemoration ==
Ninety-four years after the lynching, in February 2000, Hamilton County Criminal Judge Doug Meyer overturned Johnson's conviction after hearing arguments that Johnson did not receive a fair trial because of the all-white jury and the judge's refusal to move the trial from Chattanooga, where there was much publicity about the case. On April 15, 2016, the Tennessee General Assembly passed a resolution, commending the valor of Johnson's legal defense and the federal intervention by President Theodore Roosevelt, the Justice Department and the Supreme Court and deploring the actions of Shipp and the lynch mob which he abetted in the "untimely lynching of Mr. Ed Johnson."

== See also ==
- Edward Terry Sanford, lead prosecutor in the case, who became a Supreme Court Justice.
- William Henry Moody, U.S. Attorney General at the time of the case and future Supreme Court Justice.
- List of United States Supreme Court cases, volume 203

== Notes ==
=== References ===
- Curriden, Mark (June 1, 2009). "A Supreme Case of Contempt: A tragic legal saga paved the way for civil rights protections and federal habeas actions". ABA Journal.
- Curriden, Mark; Phillips, Leroy (2001). Contempt of Court: The Turn of the Century Lynching That Launched a Hundred Years of Federalism. Garden City: Anchor Books. ISBN 0-385-72082-3.
