= Walnut Street Bridge (Chattanooga) =

Historic bridge in Chattanooga, Tennessee, US

- U.S. National Register of Historic Places
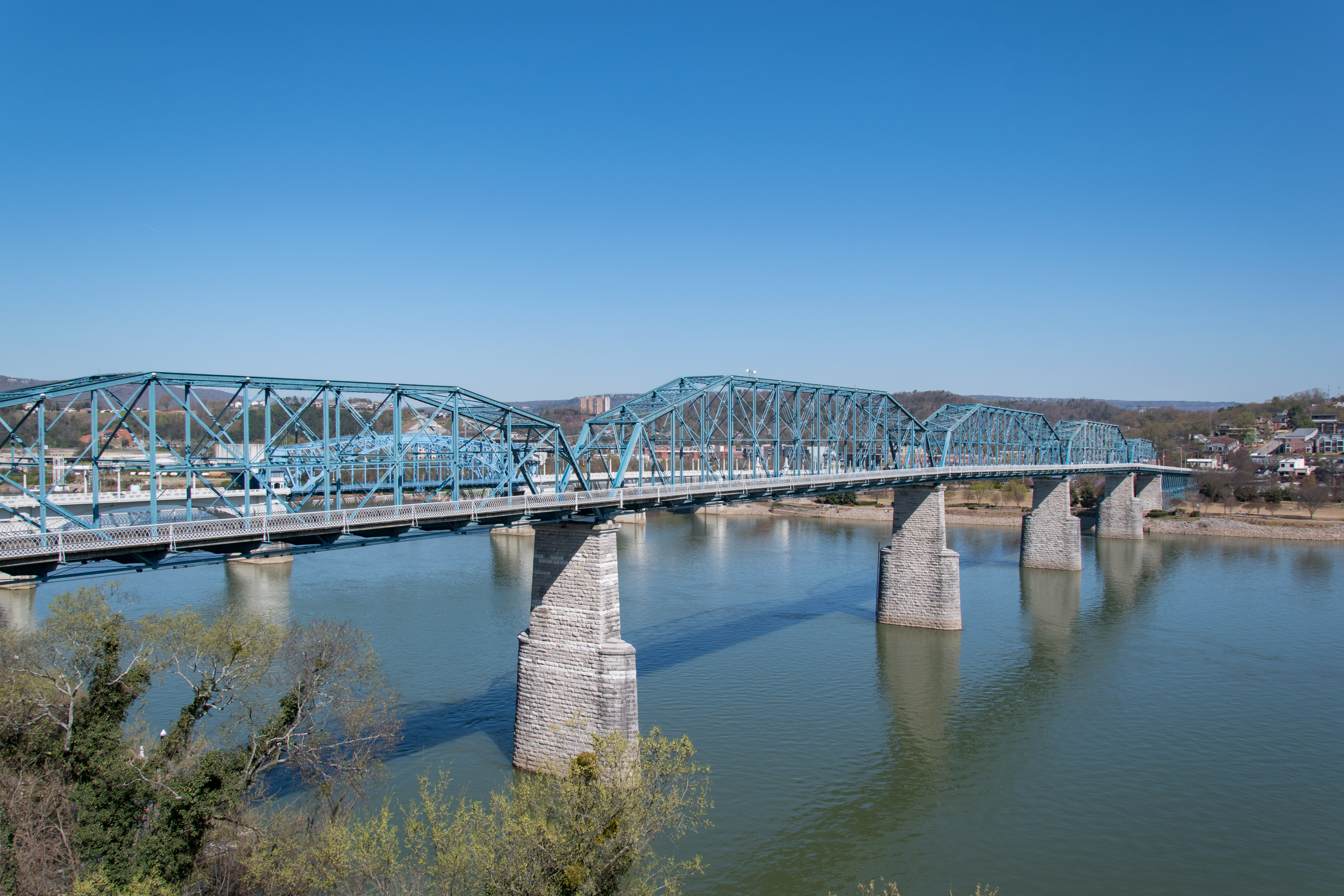

- Location within Tennessee Location within the United States
- Location: Walnut Street, over the Tennessee River, Chattanooga, Tennessee
- Coordinates: 35°3′29″N 85°18′26″W
- Area: 1.6 acres (0.65 ha)
- Built: 1890
- Architect: Edwin Thacher
- Architectural style: Camelback truss, modified
- NRHP reference No.: 90000300
- Added to NRHP: February 23, 1990

Built in 1890, the 2,376-foot-long (724 m) Walnut Street Bridge connects Chattanooga, Tennessee's downtown with North Chattanooga. The bridge's main spans are modified pin-connected Parker through truss spans. The top chord of these truss spans is configured in five sections, making the spans a Camelback truss design. The bridge is historically significant as an extremely long and old example of its type; according to the Historic American Engineering Record: "The bridge was apparently the first non-military highway bridge across the Tennessee River."

== History ==
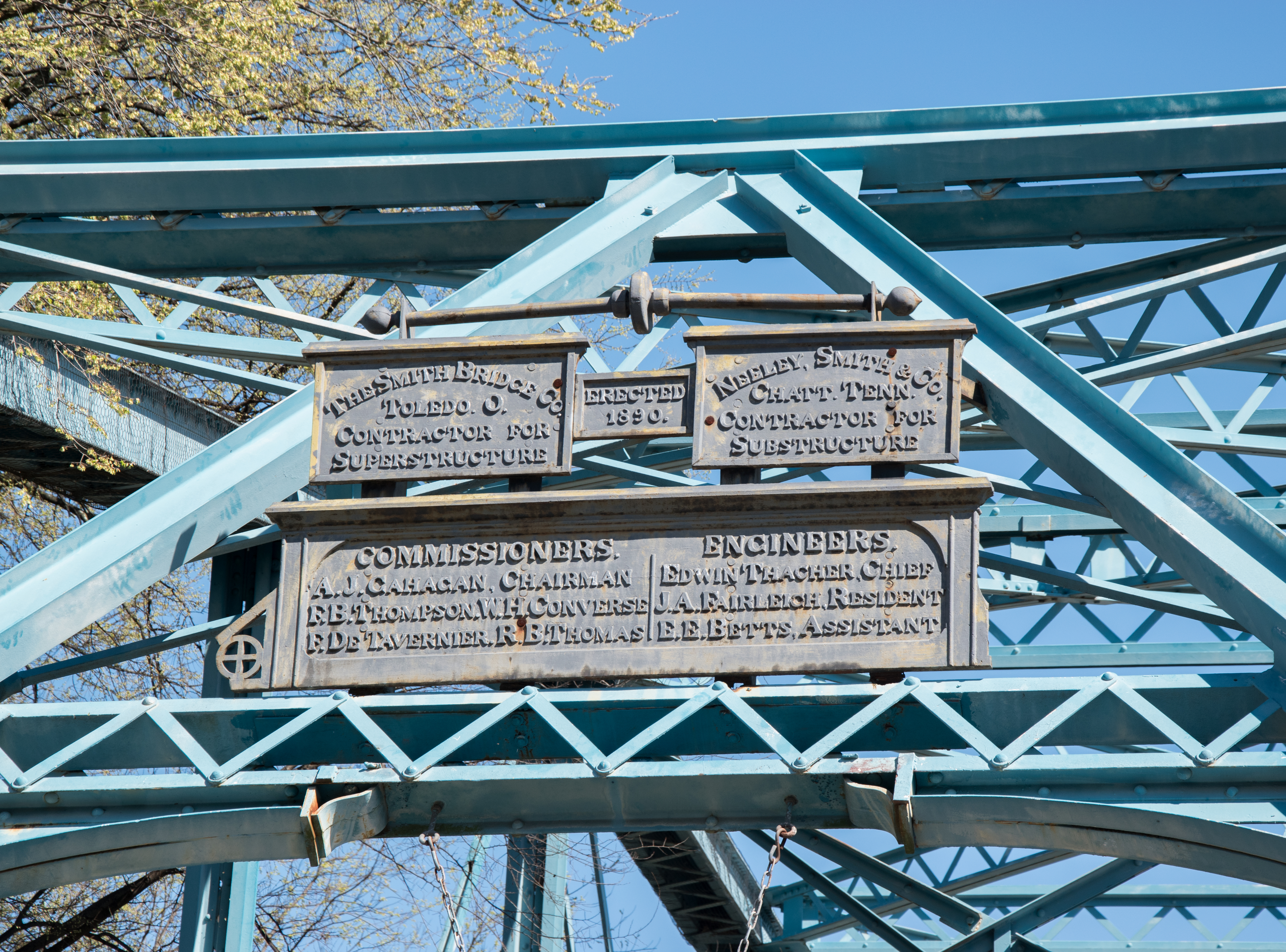
Plaques over entranceway

According to a plaque on the bridge, Edwin Thacher was the chief engineer for the bridge. The bridge's superstructure was assembled by the Smith Bridge Company of Toledo, Ohio, which was a prolific late 19th-century bridge builder. The bridge's substructure was constructed by Neeley, Smith, and Company of Chattanooga. Most of the parts for the bridge were manufactured by Manly Jail Works of Dalton, Georgia and then shipped to the site by rail.

A former Union officer from Ann Arbor, Michigan, William Andrew Slayton (1854–1935) was the stone contractor. Slayton lived in a stone house at 533 Barton Avenue, the house known for years by later inhabitants as the location of the "Little Art Shop". It is not known if he built this house, but similarly to Washington Roebling and the Brooklyn Bridge, he could overlook the project from his window. Many of the low stone walls in North Chattanooga are made up of the remnants of stones deemed too small for use in the piers. Subdivision plats in Chattanooga suggest that Slayton developed some areas to facilitate the hauling of materials from quarries in northeastern Alabama, and Slayton Street and Slayton Avenue are found near the current public library location on Broad Street.

The "county bridge", as the Walnut Street Bridge was once known, connected the predominantly white city on the south side of the Tennessee River with the large black work force on the north side ("North Shore") in Hill City, a town that was annexed by Chattanooga in 1912.

The bridge also carried trolleys of the Chattanooga Traction Company to Signal Mountain.

Two black men were lynched on the bridge: Alfred Blount on February 14, 1893, was hanged from the first span for allegedly attacking a white woman; Ed Johnson on March 19, 1906, was hanged from the second span, also for allegedly attacking a white woman. Johnson's lynching initiated a court case (United States v. Shipp) before the Supreme Court that is notable for being the only criminal trial in its history.

== Reconstruction ==
The bridge was closed to motor vehicles in 1978 and sat in disuse and disrepair for nearly a decade. Repairs and structural modifications have been made to turn the bridge into what is now a pedestrian walkway. The Walnut Street Bridge was added to the National Register of Historic Places on February 23, 1990. The 2,376-foot-long (724 m) pedestrian bridge sits near the heart of a massive and recently completed urban renewal project.

From December 2009 to May 2010, the bridge's deteriorating asphalt surface was replaced with wood planking. The City Council awarded a $1.3 million contract to Tower Construction for the bridge repair work.

The Walnut Street Bridge fund was started by Chattanooga Venture, a community group, to receive funds to be used by the city toward restoration of the bridge. Once the campaign was finished, the remaining funds were used for additional improvements to the bridge. These funds led to the replacement of original plaques which had been damaged, vandalized, or stolen. The original plaques have been renamed to The Parks Foundation, an organization committed to enhancements, improvements and programming to extend the utilization of all our parks and public space to the greatest number of people. The foundation is offering new plaques to donors that strive for the same mission.

== Community events ==
Wine over Water is a wine tasting event that takes place on the Walnut Street Bridge. The event started in 1994. Over 150 wines from all over the world get tasted. During the festival, local restaurants offer different tasting plates for purchase. Regional musicians and bands come to play jazz and classic bluegrass. The event is not free and tickets are sold quickly due to popularity.

Every summer, Chattanooga hosts the Riverbend Festival where country music and rock bands come and play for the city. On the last night of the festival, fireworks are shot off for the spectators. The bridge is used to display a bright waterfall of fireworks, which fall down into the river below. The fireworks are displayed at the middle of the bridge, and boaters are not allowed within several hundred feet.

The Seven Bridges Marathon takes place in Chattanooga, and the participants use the Walnut Street Bridge as part of the course. Participants, local Chattanoogans as well as tourists, enjoy the views from the bridge that extend up and down the river.

Ironman is a world-renowned triathlon with events scheduled throughout the year all over the planet. Chattanooga has hosted Ironman in 2014, 2015 and hosted the Ironman world championship in 2017. Athletes use the Walnut Street bridge during the running portion of the race.

== See also ==
- List of bridges documented by the Historic American Engineering Record in Tennessee
