= Thompson v. United States =

Thompson v. United States is the name of several United States Supreme Court cases:

- Thompson v. United States, 604 U.S. ___ (2025): A statute that prohibits knowingly making a false statement to influence the FDIC’s action on a loan does not criminalize statements that are misleading but not false.
- Thompson v. United States, 103 U.S. 480 (1881)
- Thompson v. United States, 142 U.S. 471 (1892)
- Thompson v. United States, 155 U.S. 271 (1894)
- Thompson v. United States, 246 U.S. 547 (1918)
- Thompson v. United States, 343 U.S. 549 (1952)
- Thompson v. United States, 400 U.S. 17 (1970)
- Thompson v. United States, 444 U.S. 248 (1980)
