= List of United States Supreme Court cases, volume 155 =

Supreme Court of the United States
- Interactive map of Supreme Court of the United States
- 38°53′26″N 77°00′16″W
- Established: March 4, 1789; 236 years ago
- Location: Washington, D.C.
- Coordinates: 38°53′26″N 77°00′16″W
- Composition method: Presidential nomination with Senate confirmation
- Authorised by: Constitution of the United States, Art. III, § 1
- Judge term length: life tenure, subject to impeachment and removal
- Number of positions: 9 (by statute)
- Website: supremecourt.gov

This is a list of cases reported in volume 155 of United States Reports, decided by the Supreme Court of the United States in 1894 and 1895.

== Justices of the Supreme Court at the time of volume 155 U.S. ==
The Supreme Court is established by Article III, Section 1 of the Constitution of the United States, which says: "The judicial Power of the United States, shall be vested in one supreme Court . . .". The size of the Court is not specified; the Constitution leaves it to Congress to set the number of justices. Under the Judiciary Act of 1789 Congress originally fixed the number of justices at six (one chief justice and five associate justices). Since 1789 Congress has varied the size of the Court from six to seven, nine, ten, and back to nine justices (always including one chief justice).

When the cases in volume 155 were decided the Court comprised the following nine members:

Portrait	Justice	Office	Home State	Succeeded	Date confirmed by the Senate (Vote)	Tenure on Supreme Court
	Melville Fuller	Chief Justice	Illinois	Morrison Waite	July 20, 1888 (41–20)	October 8, 1888 – July 4, 1910 (Died)
	Stephen Johnson Field	Associate Justice	California	newly created seat	March 10, 1863 (Acclamation)	May 10, 1863 – December 1, 1897 (Retired)
	John Marshall Harlan	Associate Justice	Kentucky	David Davis	November 29, 1877 (Acclamation)	December 10, 1877 – October 14, 1911 (Died)
	Horace Gray	Associate Justice	Massachusetts	Nathan Clifford	December 20, 1881 (51–5)	January 9, 1882 – September 15, 1902 (Died)
	David Josiah Brewer	Associate Justice	Kansas	Stanley Matthews	December 18, 1889 (53–11)	January 6, 1890 – March 28, 1910 (Died)
	Henry Billings Brown	Associate Justice	Michigan	Samuel Freeman Miller	December 29, 1890 (Acclamation)	January 5, 1891 – May 28, 1906 (Retired)
	George Shiras Jr.	Associate Justice	Pennsylvania	Joseph P. Bradley	July 26, 1892 (Acclamation)	October 10, 1892 – February 23, 1903 (Retired)
	Howell Edmunds Jackson	Associate Justice	Tennessee	Lucius Quintus Cincinnatus Lamar	February 18, 1893 (Acclamation)	March 4, 1893 – August 8, 1895 (Died)
	Edward Douglass White	Associate Justice	Louisiana	Samuel Blatchford	February 19, 1894 (Acclamation)	March 12, 1894 – December 18, 1910 (Continued as chief justice)

== Notable Case in 155 U.S. ==
=== Schillinger v. United States ===
In Schillinger v. United States, 155 U.S. 163 (1894), the Supreme Court held that a suit for patent infringement cannot be entertained against the United States, because patent infringement is a tort and the United States had not waived sovereign immunity for intentional torts. The United States subsequently waived sovereign immunity for torts committed negligently.

== Citation style ==
Under the Judiciary Act of 1789 the federal court structure at the time comprised District Courts, which had general trial jurisdiction; Circuit Courts, which had mixed trial and appellate (from the US District Courts) jurisdiction; and the United States Supreme Court, which had appellate jurisdiction over the federal District and Circuit courts—and for certain issues over state courts. The Supreme Court also had limited original jurisdiction (i.e., in which cases could be filed directly with the Supreme Court without first having been heard by a lower federal or state court). There were one or more federal District Courts and/or Circuit Courts in each state, territory, or other geographical region.

The Judiciary Act of 1891 created the United States Courts of Appeals and reassigned the jurisdiction of most routine appeals from the district and circuit courts to these appellate courts. The Act created nine new courts that were originally known as the "United States Circuit Courts of Appeals." The new courts had jurisdiction over most appeals of lower court decisions. The Supreme Court could review either legal issues that a court of appeals certified or decisions of court of appeals by writ of certiorari.

Bluebook citation style is used for case names, citations, and jurisdictions.

- "# Cir." = United States Court of Appeals
  - e.g., "3d Cir." = United States Court of Appeals for the Third Circuit
- "C.C.D." = United States Circuit Court for the District of . . .
  - e.g.,"C.C.D.N.J." = United States Circuit Court for the District of New Jersey
- "D." = United States District Court for the District of . . .
  - e.g.,"D. Mass." = United States District Court for the District of Massachusetts
- "E." = Eastern; "M." = Middle; "N." = Northern; "S." = Southern; "W." = Western
  - e.g.,"C.C.S.D.N.Y." = United States Circuit Court for the Southern District of New York
  - e.g.,"M.D. Ala." = United States District Court for the Middle District of Alabama
- "Ct. Cl." = United States Court of Claims
- The abbreviation of a state's name alone indicates the highest appellate court in that state's judiciary at the time.
  - e.g.,"Pa." = Supreme Court of Pennsylvania
  - e.g.,"Me." = Supreme Judicial Court of Maine

== List of cases in volume 155 U.S. ==
Case Name	Page and year	Opinion of the Court	Concurring opinion(s)	Dissenting opinion(s)	Lower Court	Disposition
Interstate Commerce Commission v. Brimson	3 (1894)	Harlan (see 154 U.S. 447)	none	Brewer	C.C.N.D. Ill.	reversed
Robb v. Vos	13 (1894)	Shiras	none	none	C.C.S.D. Ohio	affirmed
Talbert v. United States	45 (1894)	Fuller	none	none	Ct. Cl.	affirmed
Wright v. Yuengling	47 (1894)	Brown	none	none	C.C.S.D.N.Y.	affirmed
Lewis v. Pima County	54 (1894)	Brown	none	none	Sup. Ct. Terr. Ariz.	affirmed
Greeley v. Lowe	58 (1894)	Brown	none	none	C.C.N.D. Fla.	reversed
United States v. Coe	76 (1894)	Fuller	none	none	Ct. Priv. Land Cl.	dismissal denied
Sipperley v. Smith	86 (1894)	Fuller	none	none	Sup. Ct. Terr. Utah	dismissed
New York v. Eno	89 (1894)	Harlan	none	Field	C.C.S.D.N.Y.	reversed
Pepke v. Cronan	100 (1894)	Fuller	none	none	D.N.D.	affirmed
Chappell v. Waterworth	102 (1894)	Gray	none	none	C.C.D. Md.	reversed
United States v. Jahn	109 (1894)	Fuller	none	none	2d Cir.	certification
Allis v. United States	117 (1894)	Brewer	none	none	C.C.E.D. Ark.	affirmed
Erhardt v. Schroeder	124 (1894)	Shiras	none	none	C.C.S.D.N.Y.	reversed
Northern Pacific Railroad Company v. Holmes	137 (1894)	Fuller	none	none	Wash.	dismissed
Olin v. Timken	141 (1894)	Fuller	none	none	C.C.S.D. Ohio	reversed
Pittsburgh, Cincinnati and St. Louis Railway Company v. Keokuk and Hamilton Bridge Company	156 (1894)	Gray	none	none	7th Cir.	certification
Schillinger v. United States	163 (1894)	Brewer	none	Harlan	Ct. Cl.	affirmed
United States v. Blackfeather	180 (1894)	Brown	none	none	Ct. Cl.	reversed
Cherokee Nation v. Journeycake	196 (1894)	Brewer	none	none	Ct. Cl.	affirmed
Cherokee Nation v. Blackfeather	218 (1894)	Brewer	none	none	Ct. Cl.	affirmed
Deland v. Platte County	221 (1894)	Fuller	none	none	C.C.W.D. Mo.	dismissed
Lloyd v. Matthews	222 (1894)	Fuller	none	none	Ky.	dismissed
Origet v. Hedden	228 (1894)	Fuller	none	none	C.C.S.D.N.Y.	affirmed
Muser v. Magone	240 (1894)	Fuller	none	none	C.C.S.D.N.Y.	affirmed
The Breakwater	252 (1894)	Brown	none	none	C.C.E.D.N.Y.	affirmed
Warren v. Keep	265 (1894)	Shiras	none	none	C.C.N.D.N.Y.	affirmed
Thompson v. United States	271 (1894)	Shiras	none	none	C.C.W.D. Ark.	reversed
Massachusetts and Southern Construction Company v. Cane Creek Township	283 (1894)	Brewer	none	none	C.C.D.S.C.	reversed
Deering v. Winona Harvester Works	286 (1894)	Brown	none	none	C.C.D. Minn.	reversed
United States ex rel. International Contracting Company v. Lamont	303 (1894)	White	none	none	Sup. Ct. D.C.	affirmed
Pearce v. Texas	311 (1894)	Fuller	none	none	Tex. Crim. App.	affirmed
Wehrman v. Conklin	314 (1894)	Brown	none	none	C.C.N.D. Iowa	affirmed
Pennsylvania Railroad Company v. Jones	333 (1894)	Shiras	none	none	Sup. Ct. D.C.	reversed
Lake Superior Ship Canal, Railway and Iron Company v. Cunningham	354 (1894)	Brewer	none	none	C.C.W.D. Mich.	affirmed
Lake Superior Ship Canal, Railway and Iron Company v. Finan	385 (1894)	Brewer	none	none	C.C.W.D. Mich.	reversed
Donahue v. Lake Superior Ship Canal, Railway and Iron Company	386 (1894)	Brewer	none	none	C.C.W.D. Mich.	reversed
United States v. Gunnison	389 (1894)	White	none	none	Ct. Cl.	reversed
Horne v. George H. Hammond Company	393 (1894)	Fuller	none	none	C.C.D. Mass.	reversed
Swan v. Hill	394 (1894)	Fuller	none	none	Sup. Ct. Terr. Ariz.	affirmed
In re Rice	396 (1894)	Fuller	none	none	C.C.E.D. Pa.	mandamus denied
Dick v. Foraker	404 (1894)	White	none	none	C.C.E.D. Ark.	reversed
Bobb v. Jamison	416 (1894)	Fuller	none	none	Mo.	dismissed
Austin v. United States	417 (1894)	Fuller	none	none	Ct. Cl.	affirmed
Ingraham v. United States	434 (1894)	Harlan	none	none	C.C.D.R.I.	affirmed
Potter v. United States	438 (1894)	Brewer	none	none	C.C.D. Mass.	reversed
Alsop v. Riker	448 (1894)	Harlan	none	none	C.C.S.D.N.Y.	reversed
Plumley v. Massachusetts	461 (1894)	Harlan	none	Fuller	Mass.	affirmed
Postal Telegraph Cable Company v. Alabama	482 (1894)	Gray	none	none	C.C.M.D. Ala.	reversed
East Lake Land Company v. Brown	488 (1894)	Fuller	none	none	C.C.N.D. Ala.	reversed
Chase v. United States	489 (1894)	Harlan	none	none	C.C.D. Ind.	affirmed
Linford v. Ellison	503 (1895)	Fuller	none	Harlan	Sup. Ct. Terr. Utah	dismissed
Indiana ex rel. Stanton v. Glover	513 (1895)	Fuller	none	none	C.C.D. Ind.	affirmed
In re New York and Porto Rico Steamship Company	523 (1895)	Fuller	none	none	2d Cir.	prohibition denied
Cooper v. Newell	532 (1895)	Fuller	none	none	C.C.E.D. Tex.	reversed
Burke v. American Loan and Trust Company	534 (1895)	Brewer	none	none	C.C.N.D. Ohio	affirmed
South Carolina v. Wesley	542 (1895)	Fuller	none	none	C.C.D.S.C.	dismissed
Westmoreland v. United States	545 (1895)	Brewer	none	none	C.C.E.D. Tex.	affirmed
McCabe v. Matthews	550 (1895)	Brewer	none	none	C.C.N.D. Fla.	affirmed
Evansville Bank v. German-American Bank	556 (1895)	Brewer	none	none	C.C.D. Ind.	affirmed
Coupe v. Royer	565 (1895)	Shiras	none	none	C.C.D. Mass.	reversed
Texas and Pacific Railway Company v. Interstate Transportation Company	585 (1895)	Shiras	none	none	C.C.E.D. La.	affirmed
United States v. Allred	591 (1895)	Brown	none	none	Ct. Cl.	affirmed
Potts v. Creager	597 (1895)	Brown	none	none	C.C.S.D. Ohio	reversed
Campbell v. City of Haverhill	610 (1895)	Brown	none	none	C.C.D. Mass.	affirmed
Market Street Cable Railway Company v. Rowley	621 (1895)	Shiras	none	Brown	C.C.N.D. Cal.	reversed
Davis v. Schwartz	631 (1895)	Brown	none	none	C.C.S.D. Iowa	multiple
Hooper v. California	648 (1895)	White	none	Harlan	Cal. Super. Ct.	affirmed
Brown v. Spilman	665 (1895)	Shiras	none	none	C.C.D.W. Va.	reversed
Sherman v. United States	673 (1895)	Brown	none	none	Ct. Cl.	affirmed
McKnight v. James	685 (1895)	Brown	none	none	Ohio Cir. Ct.	dismissed
Postal Telegraph Company v. Adams	688 (1895)	Fuller	none	none	Miss.	affirmed

== See also ==
- Certificate of division
