= Counselman v. Hitchcock =

- Supreme Court of the United States

Argued December 9–10, 1891 Decided January 11, 1892
- Full case name: Counselman v. Hitchcock
- Citations: 142 U.S. 547 (more) 12 S. Ct. 195; 35 L. Ed. 1110; 1892 U.S. LEXIS 1990; 3 A.F.T.R. (P-H) 2529

Case history
- Prior: Appeal from the Circuit Court of the United States for the Northern District of Illinois

Court membership
- Chief Justice Melville Fuller Associate Justices Stephen J. Field · Joseph P. Bradley; John M. Harlan · Horace Gray; Samuel Blatchford · Lucius Q. C. Lamar II; David J. Brewer · Henry B. Brown

Case opinion
- Majority: Blatchford, joined by unanimous

Counselman v. Hitchcock, 142 U.S. 547 (1892), is a United States Supreme Court case in which the Court ruled that not incriminating an individual for testimony was not the same as not requiring them to testify at all. The court reasoned that as long as evidence arising from the compelled testimony could incriminate the individual in any way, the Fifth Amendment guarantee against self-incrimination was not satisfied. The court then adopted the broader "transactional immunity" rule.
