= List of United States Supreme Court cases, volume 173 =

Supreme Court of the United States
- Interactive map of Supreme Court of the United States
- 38°53′26″N 77°00′16″W
- Established: March 4, 1789; 236 years ago
- Location: Washington, D.C.
- Coordinates: 38°53′26″N 77°00′16″W
- Composition method: Presidential nomination with Senate confirmation
- Authorised by: Constitution of the United States, Art. III, § 1
- Judge term length: life tenure, subject to impeachment and removal
- Number of positions: 9 (by statute)
- Website: supremecourt.gov

This is a list of cases reported in volume 173 of United States Reports, decided by the Supreme Court of the United States in 1899.

== Justices of the Supreme Court at the time of volume 173 U.S. ==
The Supreme Court is established by Article III, Section 1 of the Constitution of the United States, which says: "The judicial Power of the United States, shall be vested in one supreme Court . . .". The size of the Court is not specified; the Constitution leaves it to Congress to set the number of justices. Under the Judiciary Act of 1789 Congress originally fixed the number of justices at six (one chief justice and five associate justices). Since 1789 Congress has varied the size of the Court from six to seven, nine, ten, and back to nine justices (always including one chief justice).

When the cases in volume 173 were decided the Court comprised the following nine members:

Portrait	Justice	Office	Home State	Succeeded	Date confirmed by the Senate (Vote)	Tenure on Supreme Court
	Melville Fuller	Chief Justice	Illinois	Morrison Waite	July 20, 1888 (41–20)	October 8, 1888 – July 4, 1910 (Died)
	John Marshall Harlan	Associate Justice	Kentucky	David Davis	November 29, 1877 (Acclamation)	December 10, 1877 – October 14, 1911 (Died)
	Horace Gray	Associate Justice	Massachusetts	Nathan Clifford	December 20, 1881 (51–5)	January 9, 1882 – September 15, 1902 (Died)
	David Josiah Brewer	Associate Justice	Kansas	Stanley Matthews	December 18, 1889 (53–11)	January 6, 1890 – March 28, 1910 (Died)
	Henry Billings Brown	Associate Justice	Michigan	Samuel Freeman Miller	December 29, 1890 (Acclamation)	January 5, 1891 – May 28, 1906 (Retired)
	George Shiras Jr.	Associate Justice	Pennsylvania	Joseph P. Bradley	July 26, 1892 (Acclamation)	October 10, 1892 – February 23, 1903 (Retired)
	Edward Douglass White	Associate Justice	Louisiana	Samuel Blatchford	February 19, 1894 (Acclamation)	March 12, 1894 – December 18, 1910 (Continued as chief justice)
	Rufus W. Peckham	Associate Justice	New York	Howell Edmunds Jackson	December 9, 1895 (Acclamation)	January 6, 1896 – October 24, 1909 (Died)
	Joseph McKenna	Associate Justice	California	Stephen Johnson Field	January 21, 1898 (Acclamation)	January 26, 1898 – January 5, 1925 (Retired)

== Citation style ==
Under the Judiciary Act of 1789 the federal court structure at the time comprised District Courts, which had general trial jurisdiction; Circuit Courts, which had mixed trial and appellate (from the US District Courts) jurisdiction; and the United States Supreme Court, which had appellate jurisdiction over the federal District and Circuit courts—and for certain issues over state courts. The Supreme Court also had limited original jurisdiction (i.e., in which cases could be filed directly with the Supreme Court without first having been heard by a lower federal or state court). There were one or more federal District Courts and/or Circuit Courts in each state, territory, or other geographical region.

The Judiciary Act of 1891 created the United States Courts of Appeals and reassigned the jurisdiction of most routine appeals from the district and circuit courts to these appellate courts. The Act created nine new courts that were originally known as the "United States Circuit Courts of Appeals." The new courts had jurisdiction over most appeals of lower court decisions. The Supreme Court could review either legal issues that a court of appeals certified or decisions of court of appeals by writ of certiorari.

Bluebook citation style is used for case names, citations, and jurisdictions.

- "# Cir." = United States Court of Appeals
  - e.g., "3d Cir." = United States Court of Appeals for the Third Circuit
- "C.C.D." = United States Circuit Court for the District of . . .
  - e.g.,"C.C.D.N.J." = United States Circuit Court for the District of New Jersey
- "D." = United States District Court for the District of . . .
  - e.g.,"D. Mass." = United States District Court for the District of Massachusetts
- "E." = Eastern; "M." = Middle; "N." = Northern; "S." = Southern; "W." = Western
  - e.g.,"C.C.S.D.N.Y." = United States Circuit Court for the Southern District of New York
  - e.g.,"M.D. Ala." = United States District Court for the Middle District of Alabama
- "Ct. Cl." = United States Court of Claims
- The abbreviation of a state's name alone indicates the highest appellate court in that state's judiciary at the time.
  - e.g.,"Pa." = Supreme Court of Pennsylvania
  - e.g.,"Me." = Supreme Judicial Court of Maine

== List of cases in volume 173 U.S. ==
Case Name	Page and year	Opinion of the Court	Concurring opinion(s)	Dissenting opinion(s)	Lower Court	Disposition
Pierce v. Tennessee Coal, Iron and Railroad Company	1 (1899)	Gray	none	none	5th Cir.	reversed
Towson v. Moore	17 (1899)	Gray	none	none	D.C. Cir.	affirmed
Lomax v. Pickering	26 (1899)	Brown	none	none	Ill.	affirmed
Wilson v. City of Eureka	32 (1899)	McKenna	none	none	Utah	affirmed
McIntire v. Pryor	38 (1899)	Brown	none	none	D.C. Cir.	affirmed
Calhoun v. Violet	60 (1899)	White	none	none	Sup. Ct. Terr. Okla.	affirmed
Dunlap v. United States	65 (1899)	Fuller	none	none	Ct. Cl.	affirmed
United States v. Navarre	77 (1899)	McKenna	none	none	Ct. Cl.	affirmed
Collier v. United States	79 (1899)	White	none	none	Ct. Cl.	affirmed
Central Loan and Trust Company v. Campbell Commission Company	84 (1899)	White	none	none	Sup. Ct. Terr. Okla.	reversed
Sioux City Terminal Railroad and Warehouse Company v. Trust Company of North America	99 (1899)	White	none	none	8th Cir.	affirmed
Bausman v. Dixon	113 (1899)	Fuller	none	none	Wash.	dismissed
Mullen v. Western Union Beef Company	116 (1899)	Fuller	none	none	Colo. Ct. App.	dismissed
Henrietta Mining and Milling Company v. Gardner	123 (1899)	McKenna	none	none	Sup. Ct. Terr. Ariz.	reversed
Merrill v. National Bank of Jacksonville	131 (1899)	Fuller	none	White; Gray	5th Cir.	affirmed
Green Bay and Mississippi Canal Company v. Patten Paper Company	179 (1899)	Shiras	none	none	Wis.	rehearing denied
City of New Orleans v. Quinlan	191 (1899)	Fuller	none	none	C.C.E.D. La.	affirmed
Dewey v. City of Des Moines	193 (1899)	Peckham	none	none	Iowa	reversed
First National Bank v. Chapman	205 (1899)	Peckham	none	none	Ohio	affirmed
Henrietta Mining and Milling Company v. Johnson	221 (1899)	Brown	none	none	Sup. Ct. Terr. Ariz.	affirmed
Henrietta Mining and Milling Company v. Hill	225 (1899)	Brown	none	none	Sup. Ct. Terr. Ariz.	affirmed
Baltimore and Ohio Railroad Company v. Joy	226 (1899)	Harlan	none	none	6th Cir.	certification
City of Covington v. Kentucky	231 (1899)	Harlan	none	none	Ky.	affirmed
Lake County v. Dudley	243 (1899)	Harlan	none	none	8th Cir.	reversed
Gunnison County v. E.H. Rollins Sons	255 (1899)	Harlan	none	none	8th Cir.	reversed
Ohio v. Thomas	276 (1899)	Peckham	none	none	6th Cir.	affirmed
Lake Shore and Michigan Southern Railway Company v. Ohio	285 (1899)	Harlan	none	Shiras; White	Ohio	affirmed
Nugent v. Arizona Improvement Company	338 (1899)	Harlan	none	none	Sup. Ct. Terr. Ariz.	reversed
Texas and Pacific Railway Company v. Clayton	348 (1899)	Harlan	none	none	2d Cir.	affirmed
United States v. Johnson	363 (1899)	Harlan	none	none	2d Cir.	certification
United States v. Matthews	381 (1899)	White	Brown	none	Ct. Cl.	affirmed
Allen v. Smith	389 (1899)	Brown	none	none	La.	reversed
St. Louis, Iron Mountain and St. Paul Railway Company v. Paul	404 (1899)	Fuller	none	none	Ark.	affirmed
Price v. Forrest	410 (1899)	Harlan	none	none	N.J.	affirmed
Smith v. Burnett	430 (1899)	Fuller	none	none	D.C. Cir.	affirmed
Yerke v. United States	439 (1899)	McKenna	none	none	Ct. Cl.	affirmed
Remington Paper Company v. Watson	443 (1899)	McKenna	none	none	La.	dismissed
Ex parte Ward	452 (1899)	Fuller	none	none	N.D. Tex.	habeas corpus denied
Third Street and Suburban Railway Company v. Lewis	457 (1899)	Fuller	none	none	9th Cir.	dismissed
Turner v. Wilkes County	461 (1899)	Peckham	none	none	N.C.	dismissed
United States v. New York Indians	464 (1899)	Brown	none	none	Ct. Cl.	dismissed
Brown v. Hitchcock	473 (1899)	Brewer	none	none	D.C. Cir.	affirmed
Allen v. Southern Pacific Railroad Company	479 (1899)	White	none	none	Cal.	dismissed
Medbury v. United States	492 (1899)	Peckham	none	none	Ct. Cl.	affirmed
Blythe v. Hinckley	501 (1899)	Fuller	none	none	C.C.N.D. Cal.	dismissed
Nicol v. Ames	509 (1899)	Peckham	none	none	C.C.N.D. Ill.	affirmed
Guthrie National Bank v. City of Guthrie	528 (1899)	Peckham	none	none	Sup. Ct. Terr. Okla.	reversed
The Chattahoochee	540 (1899)	Brown	none	none	1st Cir.	affirmed
Cooper v. Newell	555 (1899)	Fuller	none	none	5th Cir.	certification
Pope v. Louisville, New Albany and Chicago Railway Company	573 (1899)	Fuller	none	none	7th Cir.	dismissed
Guarantee Company v. Mechanics' Savings Bank and Trust Company	582 (1899)	Harlan	none	none	6th Cir.	reversed
Duluth and Iron Range Railroad Company v. Roy	587 (1899)	McKenna	none	none	Minn.	affirmed
Henderson Bridge Company v. City of Henderson I	592 (1899)	Harlan	none	none	Ky.	affirmed
Henderson Bridge Company v. City of Henderson II	624 (1899)	Harlan	none	none	Ky.	affirmed
Security Trust Company v. Dodd Mead and Company	624 (1899)	Brown	none	none	8th Cir.	certification
Citizens' Savings Bank of Owensboro v. City of Owensboro	636 (1899)	White	none	Brown	Ky.	affirmed
Deposit Bank of Owensboro v. City of Owensboro	662 (1899)	White	none	none	Ky.	affirmed
Owensboro National Bank v. City of Owensboro	664 (1899)	White	none	none	Ky.	reversed
Lake Shore and Michigan Southern Railway Company v. Smith	684 (1899)	Peckham	none	none	Mich.	reversed

== See also ==
- Certificate of division
