= United States v. Johnson (1899) =

- Supreme Court of the United States

Submitted November 10, 1898 Decided February 27, 1899
- Full case name: United States v. Johnson
- Citations: 173 U.S. 363 (more) 19 S. Ct. 427; 43 L. Ed. 731; 1899 U.S. LEXIS 1441

Court membership
- Chief Justice Melville Fuller Associate Justices John M. Harlan · Horace Gray; David J. Brewer · Henry B. Brown; George Shiras Jr. · Edward D. White; Rufus W. Peckham · Joseph McKenna

Case opinions
- Majority: Harlan, joined by Fuller, Gray, Brewer, Brown, White, McKenna
- Dissent: Shiras
- Dissent: Peckham

United States v. Johnson, 173 U.S. 363 (1899), was a United States Supreme Court case.

== Background ==
Johnson, while the U.S. District Attorney for the Southern District of New York, was claiming extra compensation as for special services in a suit to condemn lands for a mortar battery upon direction of the Attorney General at the request of the Secretary of War. He had presented two bills totaling $6,500, which the Attorney General approved and allowed, by which the Accounting Officers of the Government refused to pay.

== Opinion of the Court ==
In this refusal they were upheld by the Supreme Court. While the Act of March 2, 1889, 40 U.S.C.A. § 256 (which requires that all legal services connected with the procurement of title should be rendered by U.S. District Attorneys) was in force at the time the direction by the Attorney General was given to Johnson in 1891, the Supreme Court, nevertheless, made no reference to that Statute in the Opinion, but based its conclusions upon the Statute of August 1, 1888, 40 U.S.C.A. § 257, which required the Attorney General upon request of the appropriate officer of the Department "to cause proceedings to be commenced for condemnation", and upon the general statute prescribing it to be the duty of the United States District Attorney to prosecute all civil actions in which the U.S. is concerned. 28 U.S.C.A. § 485.

The Court stated the question as follows:

The controlling question, therefore, in the present case is whether Johnson was Under a duty imposed upon him as district attorney to perform the services for which he here claims special compensation. If such was his duty as defined by law, then he is forbidden by statute from receiving any special compensation on account of such services; this for the reason that no appropriation for such compensation has been made by any statute explicitly stating that it was for such additional pay, extra allowance or compensation. Rev.St. §§ 1764, 1765 [5 U.S.C.A. §§ 69, 70]. On the other hand, if his duties as district attorney did not embrace such services as he rendered, and for which he here claims special compensation, then he is entitled to be paid therefor without reference to the regular salary, pay, or emoluments attached to his office.

Basing its opinion upon which it referred to as the "clear and explicit" language of the Statute (page 378 of 173 U.S., page 432 of 19 S.Ct., 43 L.Ed. 731) and upon its previous holdings in Gibson v. Peters, 150 U.S. 342, 14 S.Ct. 134, 37 L.Ed. 1104, and upon the Opinions of the Attorney General contained in 7 Op.Atty.Gen. 84; 9 Op.Atty.Gen. 146, and 19 Op.Atty.Gen. 121, and the views of the "second comptroller of the treasury" in Cousar's Digest 12, the Court came to the conclusion that Johnson "was under a duty, as district attorney, to represent the United States in the condemnation proceedings."

== See also ==
- List of United States Supreme Court cases, volume 173
