= SS Henry B. Brown =

Liberty ship of WWII

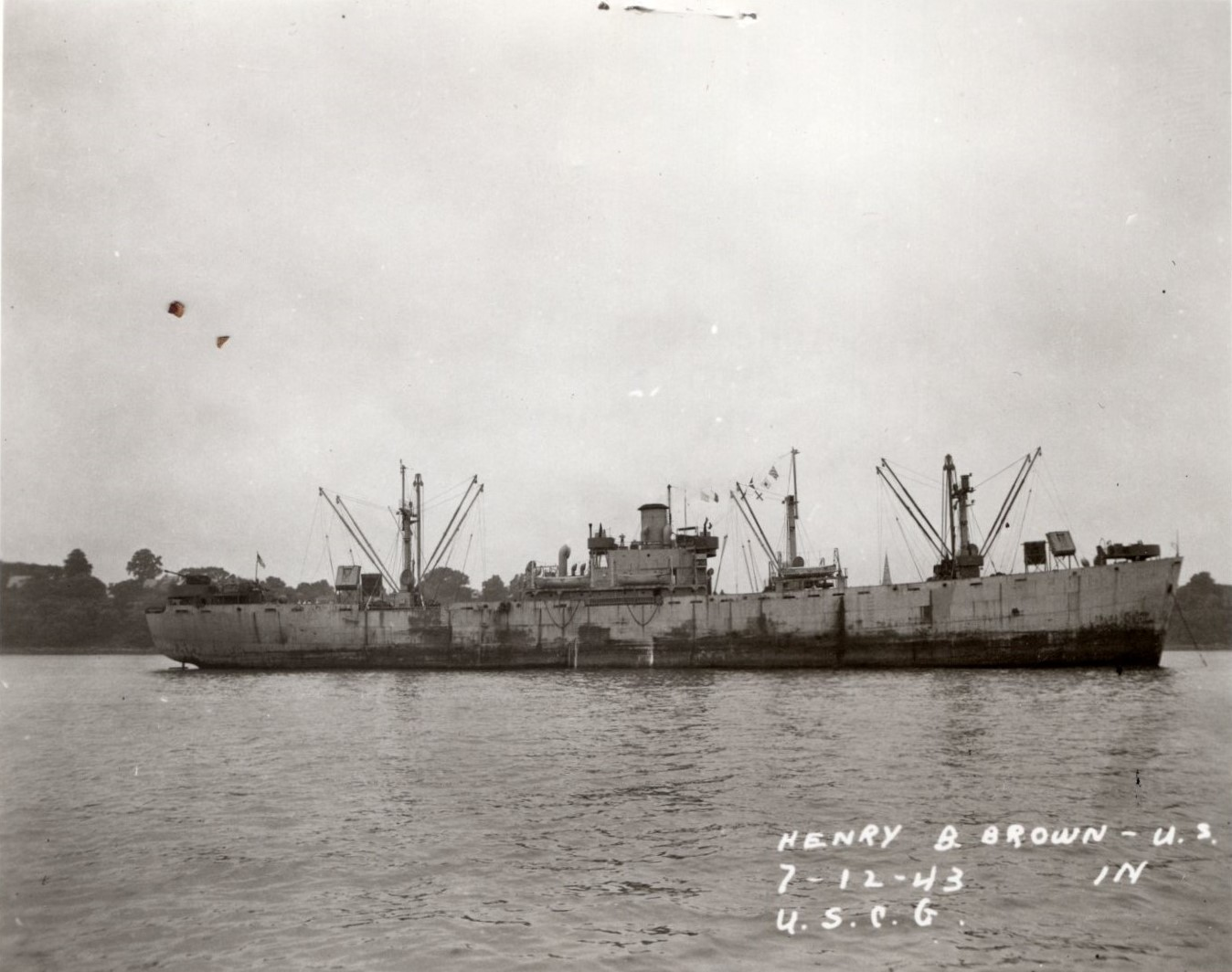
- Liberty ship Henry B. Brown, 12 July 1943

History

United States
- Name: Henry B. Brown
- Namesake: Henry B. Brown
- Owner: War Shipping Administration (WSA)
- Operator: Black Diamond Steamship Co.
- Ordered: as type (EC2-S-C1) hull, MCE hull 938
- Awarded: 30 January 1942
- Builder: Bethlehem-Fairfield Shipyard, Baltimore, Maryland
- Cost: $1,074,208
- Yard number: 2088
- Way number: 7
- Laid down: 15 December 1942
- Launched: 28 January 1943
- Sponsored by: Mrs. L. J. Salon
- Completed: 17 February 1943
- Identification: Call sign: KKAO
- Fate: Laid up in Reserve Fleet, 6 April 1948, sold for scrap 17 March 1965

General characteristics
- Class & type: Liberty ship; type EC2-S-C1, standard
- Tonnage: 10,865 LT DWT; 7,176 GRT
- Displacement: 3,380 long tons (3,434 t) (light); 14,245 long tons (14,474 t) (max)
- Length: 441 feet 6 inches (135 m) oa; 416 feet (127 m) pp; 427 feet (130 m) lwl
- Beam: 57 feet (17 m)
- Draft: 27 ft 9.25 in (8.4646 m)
- Installed power: 2 × Oil fired 450 °F (232 °C) boilers, operating at 220 psi (1,500 kPa); 2,500 hp (1,900 kW)
- Propulsion: 1 × triple-expansion steam engine, (manufactured by Worthington Pump & Machinery Corp, Harrison, New Jersey); 1 × screw propeller
- Speed: 11.5 knots (21.3 km/h; 13.2 mph)
- Capacity: 562,608 cubic feet (15,931 m^{3}) (grain); 499,573 cubic feet (14,146 m^{3}) (bale)
- Complement: 38–62 USMM; 21–40 USNAG
- Armament: Varied by ship; Bow-mounted 3-inch (76 mm)/50-caliber gun; Stern-mounted 4-inch (102 mm)/50-caliber gun; 2–8 × single 20-millimeter (0.79 in) Oerlikon anti-aircraft (AA) cannons and/or, 2–8 × 37-millimeter (1.46 in) M1 AA guns

SS Henry B. Brown was a Liberty ship built in the United States during World War II. She was named after Henry B. Brown, an American attorney and judge who served as an Associate Justice of the Supreme Court of the United States, from 1891 to 1906.

== Construction ==
Henry B. Brown was laid down on 15 December 1942, under a Maritime Commission (MARCOM) contract, MCE hull 938, by the Bethlehem-Fairfield Shipyard, Baltimore, Maryland; she was sponsored by Mrs. L. J. Salon, and launched on 28 January 1943.

== History ==
She was allocated to the Black Diamond Steamship Co., on 17 February 1943.

On 6 April 1948, she was laid up in the Wilmington Reserve Fleet, in Wilmington, North Carolina. On 17 March 1965, she was sold for $50,050, to Northern Metals, to be scrapped. On 25 March 1965, she was withdrawn from the fleet.

== Bibliography ==
- "Bethlehem-Fairfield, Baltimore MD". www.ShipbuildingHistory.com. 7 August 2021.
- Maritime Administration. "Henry B. Brown". Ship History Database Vessel Status Card. U.S. Department of Transportation, Maritime Administration.
- Davies, James (May 2004). "Specifications (As-Built)" (PDF). p. 23.
- "SS Henry B. Brown".
