= Alexis C. Angell =

American judge (1857–1932)

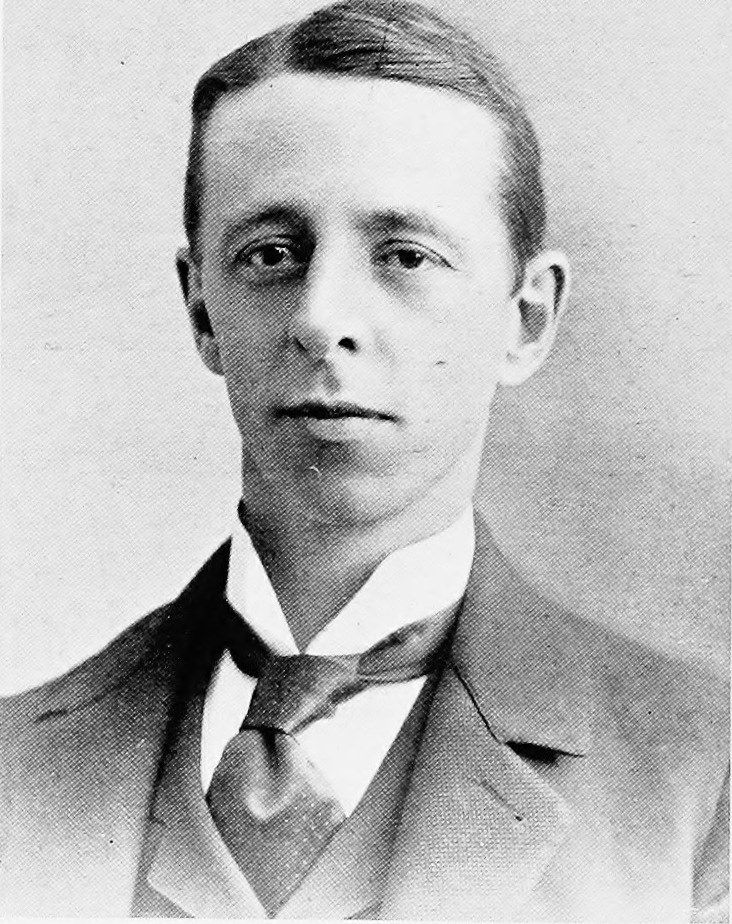

Judge of the United States District Court for the Eastern District of Michigan
- In office February 25, 1911 – June 1, 1912
- Appointed by: William Howard Taft
- Preceded by: Henry Harrison Swan
- Succeeded by: Arthur J. Tuttle

Personal details
- Born: Alexis Caswell Angell; April 26, 1857 Providence, Rhode Island, U.S.
- Died: December 24, 1932 (aged 75)
- Relations: Thomas McIntyre Cooley
- Parent: James Burrill Angell
- Relatives: Alexis Caswell
- Education: University of Michigan (AB); University of Michigan Law School (LLB) read law

Alexis Caswell Angell (April 26, 1857 – December 24, 1932), frequently known as A. C. Angell, was a United States district judge of the United States District Court for the Eastern District of Michigan.

== Education and career ==
Born on April 26, 1857, in Providence, Rhode Island, Angell received an Artium Baccalaureus degree in 1878 from the University of Michigan, read law in 1879, and received a Bachelor of Laws in 1880 from the University of Michigan Law School. He entered private practice in Detroit, Michigan from 1880 to 1911. He was a Professor of Law at the University of Michigan from 1893 to 1898, lecturing one half of each year.

== Federal judicial service ==
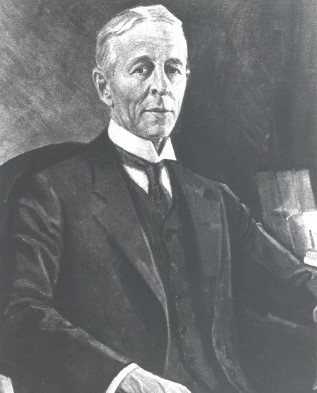
Judicial portrait of Angell, c. 1930.

Angell was nominated by President William Howard Taft on February 25, 1911, to a seat on the United States District Court for the Eastern District of Michigan vacated by Judge Henry Harrison Swan. He was confirmed by the United States Senate on March 2, 1911, and received his commission the same day. His service terminated on June 1, 1912, due to his resignation.

== Death ==
Following his resignation from the federal bench, Angell returned to private practice in Detroit from 1912 to 1932. He died on December 24, 1932.

== Family ==
Angell was the son of James Burrill Angell and Sarah Swope Caswell, and was named for his maternal grandfather, Alexis Caswell, later President of Brown University. Angell was 14 when his family moved to Ann Arbor, Michigan when his father was appointed President of the University of Michigan. In 1880, he married Fanny Cary Cooley, daughter of Law Professor Thomas McIntyre Cooley.

== Other activities ==
Angell edited the second edition of Cooley's Torts (1888), the sixth edition of his Constitutional Limitations (1890), and the second edition of his Principles of Constitutional Law (1891).

== Sources ==
- Finding aid for Alexis C. Angell Papers, 1868-1876 and 1927-1928, Bentley Historical Library, University of Michigan, n.d.

Legal offices
Preceded by Henry Harrison Swan	Judge of the United States District Court for the Eastern District of Michigan; 1911–1912	Succeeded by Arthur J. Tuttle
