= Cooper v. Newell =

- Supreme Court of the United States

Decided April 3, 1899
- Full case name: Cooper v. Newell
- Citations: 173 U.S. 555 (more)

Holding
- The final decision of a state court that claimed general jurisdiction may be collaterally attacked in federal court on the basis that the state court needed personal jurisdiction instead.

Court membership
- Chief Justice Melville Fuller Associate Justices John M. Harlan · Horace Gray; David J. Brewer · Henry B. Brown; George Shiras Jr. · Edward D. White; Rufus W. Peckham · Joseph McKenna

Case opinion
- Majority: Fuller, joined by unanimous

Laws applied
- Judiciary Act of 1891

Cooper v. Newell, 173 U.S. 555 (1899), was a United States Supreme Court case in which the Court held that the final decision of a state court that claimed general jurisdiction over a defendant may be collaterally attacked in federal court on the basis that the state court needed personal jurisdiction instead. Cooper upheld the constitutionality of the Judiciary Act of 1891 under the Full Faith and Credit Clause because that Congress may prescribe the general rules of how federal courts may recognize state court decisions.
