= Arthur A. Koscinski =

American judge (1887–1957)

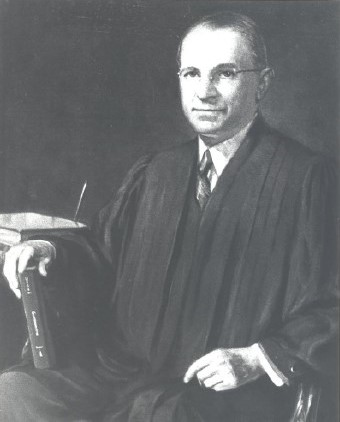
- Judicial portrait of Koscinski, c. 1957.

Senior Judge of the United States District Court for the Eastern District of Michigan
- In office April 30, 1957 – November 21, 1957

Judge of the United States District Court for the Eastern District of Michigan
- In office July 18, 1945 – April 30, 1957
- Appointed by: Harry S. Truman
- Preceded by: Arthur J. Tuttle
- Succeeded by: Clifford Patrick O'Sullivan

Personal details
- Born: Arthur A. Koscinski; April 1, 1887 Posen, German Empire
- Died: November 21, 1957 (aged 70)
- Education: University of Michigan Law School (LL.B.)

Arthur A. Koscinski (April 1, 1887 – November 21, 1957) was a United States district judge of the United States District Court for the Eastern District of Michigan.

== Education and career ==
Born in Posen, German Empire, (now Poznań, Poland), Koscinski emigrated to the United States and received a Bachelor of Laws from the University of Michigan Law School in 1910. He was in private practice in Detroit, Michigan from 1910 to 1945. He was a public administrator for Wayne County, Michigan from 1923 to 1936, and was a member of the Detroit City Pension Commission from 1934 to 1937, and then of the Michigan Public Trust Commission from 1937 to 1938. He was a government appeal agent for the Selective Service Board from 1940 to 1945. He was a member of the Michigan Constitutional Revision Commission in 1941, and a member of the Board of Wayne County Institutions from 1942 to 1943.

== Federal judicial service ==
On June 4, 1945, Koscinski was nominated by President Harry S. Truman to a seat on the United States District Court for the Eastern District of Michigan vacated by Judge Arthur J. Tuttle. Koscinski was confirmed by the United States Senate on July 17, 1945, and received his commission on July 18, 1945. He assumed senior status on April 30, 1957. Koscinski served in that capacity until his death on November 21, 1957.

== Sources ==
Legal offices
Preceded by Arthur J. Tuttle	Judge of the United States District Court for the Eastern District of Michigan; 1945–1957	Succeeded by Clifford Patrick O'Sullivan
