= Arthur J. Tuttle =

American judge (1868–1944)

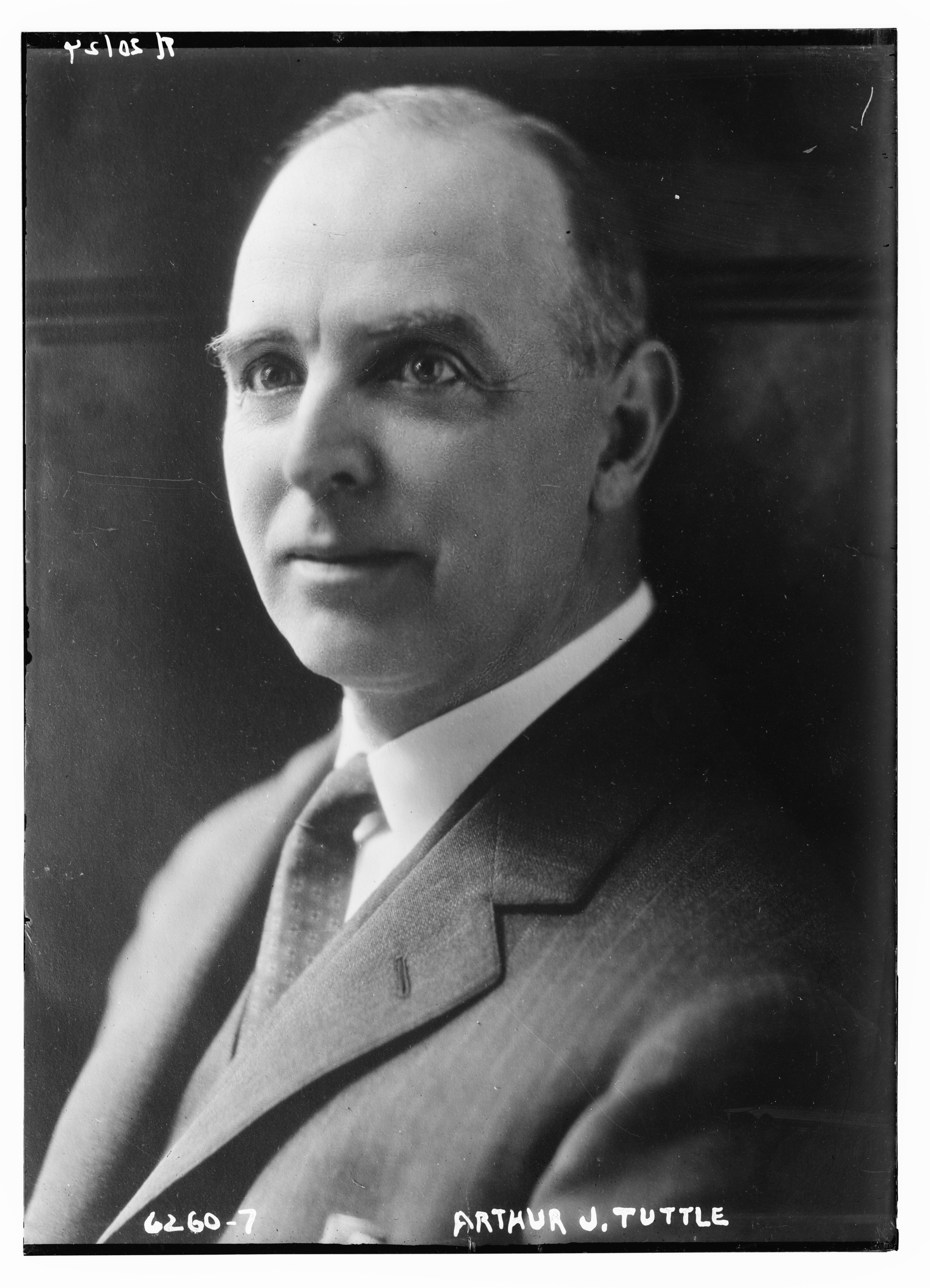

Judge of the United States District Court for the Eastern District of Michigan
- In office August 6, 1912 – December 2, 1944
- Appointed by: William Howard Taft
- Preceded by: Alexis C. Angell
- Succeeded by: Arthur A. Koscinski

United States Attorney for the Eastern District of Michigan
- In office 1911–1912
- Appointed by: William Howard Taft
- Preceded by: Frank H. Watson
- Succeeded by: Clyde J. Webster

Member of the Michigan Senate from the 14th district
- In office 1907–1910
- Preceded by: Albert B. Cook
- Succeeded by: William A. Rosenkrans

Personal details
- Born: Arthur J. Tuttle; November 8, 1868 Leslie, Michigan, U.S.
- Died: December 2, 1944 (aged 76) Detroit, Michigan, U.S.
- Resting place: Woodlawn Cemetery; Leslie, Michigan
- Education: University of Michigan (Ph.B.); University of Michigan Law School (LL.B.)

Arthur J. Tuttle (November 8, 1868 – December 2, 1944) was a United States district judge of the United States District Court for the Eastern District of Michigan.

== Education and career ==
Born in Leslie, Michigan, Tuttle received a Bachelor of Philosophy degree from the University of Michigan in 1892 and a Bachelor of Laws from the University of Michigan Law School in 1895. He was in private practice in Leslie and Lansing, Michigan from 1895 to 1899. He was prosecuting attorney of Ingham County, Michigan from 1899 to 1902 and a member of the Michigan Senate from 1907 to 1910. He was United States Attorney for the Eastern District of Michigan from 1911 to 1912.

== Federal judicial service ==
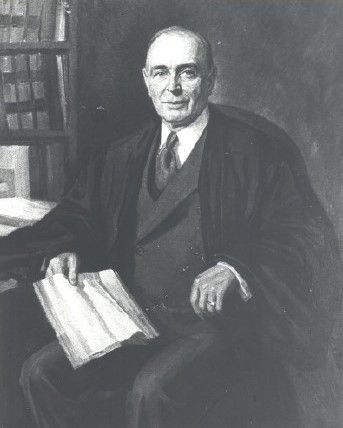
Judicial portrait of Tuttle, c. 1944.

On August 2, 1912, Tuttle was nominated by President William Howard Taft to a seat on the United States District Court for the Eastern District of Michigan vacated by Judge Alexis C. Angell. Tuttle was confirmed by the United States Senate on August 6, 1912, and received his commission the same day. Tuttle served in that capacity until his death on December 2, 1944. He was the last federal judge in active service to have been appointed by President Taft. He was interred in Woodlawn Cemetery in Leslie.

=== Notable cases ===
Tuttle oversaw the bankruptcy of the Lincoln Motor Company and set the date of the bankruptcy date as well as the minimum price of $8 million. Ford Motor Company submitted the only bid and acquired the company.

Tuttle also oversaw the 1942 treason trial of Max Stephan.

== See also ==
- List of United States federal judges by longevity of service

== Sources ==
Legal offices
Preceded by Alexis C. Angell	Judge of the United States District Court for the Eastern District of Michigan; 1912–1944	Succeeded by Arthur A. Koscinski
