= Henry Harrison Swan =

American judge

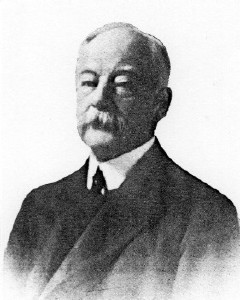

Judge of the United States District Court for the Eastern District of Michigan
- In office January 19, 1891 – July 1, 1911
- Appointed by: Benjamin Harrison
- Preceded by: Henry Billings Brown
- Succeeded by: Alexis C. Angell

Personal details
- Born: Henry Harrison Swan; October 2, 1840 Detroit, Michigan
- Died: June 12, 1916 (aged 75) Grosse Pointe, Michigan
- Education: read law

Henry Harrison Swan (October 2, 1840 – June 12, 1916) was a United States district judge of the United States District Court for the Eastern District of Michigan.

== Education and career ==
Born in Detroit, Michigan, Swan read law to enter the bar in 1867. He was in private practice in California in 1867, and in Detroit from 1869 to 1870. He was an Assistant United States Attorney for the Eastern District of Michigan from 1870 to 1877, thereafter returning to private practice in Detroit from 1877 to 1891. He was a non-resident lecturer on admiralty at the University of Michigan Law School from 1893 to 1911.

== Federal judicial service ==
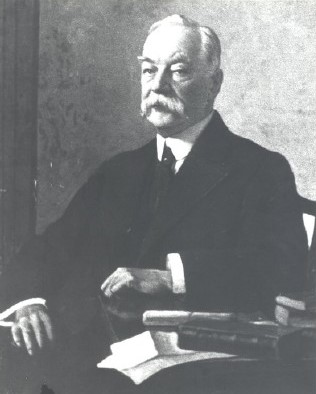
Judicial portrait of Swan, c. 1911.

On January 13, 1891, Swan was nominated by President Benjamin Harrison to a seat on the United States District Court for the Eastern District of Michigan vacated by Judge Henry Billings Brown. Swan was confirmed by the United States Senate on January 19, 1891, and received his commission the same day, serving in that capacity until his retirement on July 1, 1911.

== Death ==
Swan died on June 12, 1916, in Grosse Pointe, Michigan.

== Sources ==
Legal offices
Preceded by Henry Billings Brown	Judge of the United States District Court for the Eastern District of Michigan; 1891–1911	Succeeded by Alexis C. Angell
