= List of United States Supreme Court cases, volume 142 =

Supreme Court of the United States
- Interactive map of Supreme Court of the United States
- 38°53′26″N 77°00′16″W
- Established: March 4, 1789; 236 years ago
- Location: Washington, D.C.
- Coordinates: 38°53′26″N 77°00′16″W
- Composition method: Presidential nomination with Senate confirmation
- Authorised by: Constitution of the United States, Art. III, § 1
- Judge term length: life tenure, subject to impeachment and removal
- Number of positions: 9 (by statute)
- Website: supremecourt.gov

This is a list of cases reported in volume 142 of United States Reports, decided by the Supreme Court of the United States in 1891 and 1892.

== Justices of the Supreme Court at the time of volume 142 U.S. ==
The Supreme Court is established by Article III, Section 1 of the Constitution of the United States, which says: "The judicial Power of the United States, shall be vested in one supreme Court . . .". The size of the Court is not specified; the Constitution leaves it to Congress to set the number of justices. Under the Judiciary Act of 1789 Congress originally fixed the number of justices at six (one chief justice and five associate justices). Since 1789 Congress has varied the size of the Court from six to seven, nine, ten, and back to nine justices (always including one chief justice).

When the cases in volume 142 U.S. were decided the Court comprised the following nine members:

Portrait	Justice	Office	Home State	Succeeded	Date confirmed by the Senate (Vote)	Tenure on Supreme Court
	Melville Fuller	Chief Justice	Illinois	Morrison Waite	July 20, 1888 (41–20)	October 8, 1888 – July 4, 1910 (Died)
	Stephen Johnson Field	Associate Justice	California	newly created seat	March 10, 1863 (Acclamation)	May 10, 1863 – December 1, 1897 (Retired)
	Joseph P. Bradley	Associate Justice	New Jersey	newly created seat	March 21, 1870 (46–9)	March 23, 1870 – January 22, 1892 (Died)
	John Marshall Harlan	Associate Justice	Kentucky	David Davis	November 29, 1877 (Acclamation)	December 10, 1877 – October 14, 1911 (Died)
	Horace Gray	Associate Justice	Massachusetts	Nathan Clifford	December 20, 1881 (51–5)	January 9, 1882 – September 15, 1902 (Died)
	Samuel Blatchford	Associate Justice	New York	Ward Hunt	March 22, 1882 (Acclamation)	April 3, 1882 – July 7, 1893 (Died)
	Lucius Quintus Cincinnatus Lamar	Associate Justice	Mississippi	William Burnham Woods	January 16, 1888 (32–28)	January 18, 1888 – January 23, 1893 (Died)
	David Josiah Brewer	Associate Justice	Kansas	Stanley Matthews	December 18, 1889 (53–11)	January 6, 1890 – March 28, 1910 (Died)
	Henry Billings Brown	Associate Justice	Michigan	Samuel Freeman Miller	December 29, 1890 (Acclamation)	January 5, 1891 – May 28, 1906 (Retired)

== Citation style ==
Under the Judiciary Act of 1789 the federal court structure at the time comprised District Courts, which had general trial jurisdiction; Circuit Courts, which had mixed trial and appellate (from the US District Courts) jurisdiction; and the United States Supreme Court, which had appellate jurisdiction over the federal District and Circuit courts—and for certain issues over state courts. The Supreme Court also had limited original jurisdiction (i.e., in which cases could be filed directly with the Supreme Court without first having been heard by a lower federal or state court). There were one or more federal District Courts and/or Circuit Courts in each state, territory, or other geographical region.

The Judiciary Act of 1891 created the United States Courts of Appeals and reassigned the jurisdiction of most routine appeals from the district and circuit courts to these appellate courts. The Act created nine new courts that were originally known as the "United States Circuit Courts of Appeals." The new courts had jurisdiction over most appeals of lower court decisions. The Supreme Court could review either legal issues that a court of appeals certified or decisions of court of appeals by writ of certiorari. The change resulted in an immediate reduction in the Supreme Court's workload (from 623 cases filed in 1890 to 379 in 1891 and 275 in 1892).

Bluebook citation style is used for case names, citations, and jurisdictions.

- "# Cir." = United States Court of Appeals
  - e.g., "3d Cir." = United States Court of Appeals for the Third Circuit
- "C.C.D." = United States Circuit Court for the District of . . .
  - e.g.,"C.C.D.N.J." = United States Circuit Court for the District of New Jersey
- "D." = United States District Court for the District of . . .
  - e.g.,"D. Mass." = United States District Court for the District of Massachusetts
- "E." = Eastern; "M." = Middle; "N." = Northern; "S." = Southern; "W." = Western
  - e.g.,"C.C.S.D.N.Y." = United States Circuit Court for the Southern District of New York
  - e.g.,"M.D. Ala." = United States District Court for the Middle District of Alabama
- "Ct. Cl." = United States Court of Claims
- The abbreviation of a state's name alone indicates the highest appellate court in that state's judiciary at the time.
  - e.g.,"Pa." = Supreme Court of Pennsylvania
  - e.g.,"Me." = Supreme Judicial Court of Maine

== List of cases in volume 142 U.S. ==
Case Name	Page and year	Opinion of the Court	Concurring opinion(s)	Dissenting opinion(s)	Lower Court	Disposition
Sparhawk v. Yerkes	1 (1891)	Fuller	none	Brewer	C.C.E.D. Pa.	affirmed
New Orleans and Northeastern Railroad Company v. Jopes	18 (1891)	Brewer	none	none	C.C.S.D. Miss.	reversed
Pearce v. Rice	28 (1891)	Harlan	none	none	C.C.N.D. Ill.	affirmed
Farnsworth v. Duffner	43 (1891)	Brewer	none	none	D.W. Va.	reversed
Finn v. Brown	56 (1891)	Blatchford	none	none	C.C.D. Colo.	affirmed
Hammond v. Johnston	73 (1891)	Fuller	none	none	Mo.	dismissed
City of New Orleans v. New Orleans Water Works Company	79 (1891)	Brown	none	Harlan	La.	dismissed
Franklin County v. German Savings Bank	93 (1891)	Brown	none	none	C.C.S.D. Ill.	affirmed
Coghlan v. South Carolina Railroad Company	101 (1891)	Harlan	none	none	C.C.D.S.C.	affirmed
Hall v. Cordell	116 (1891)	Harlan	none	none	C.C.N.D. Ill.	affirmed
Chever v. Horner	122 (1891)	Fuller	none	none	Colo.	dismissed
Van Stone v. Stillwell Bierce Manufacturing Company	128 (1891)	Lamar	none	none	C.C.W.D. Mo.	affirmed
Wauton v. De Wolf	138 (1891)	Fuller	none	none	C.C.N.D. Cal.	dismissed
Claassen v. United States	140 (1891)	Gray	none	none	C.C.S.D.N.Y.	affirmed
Simmons v. United States	148 (1891)	Gray	none	none	C.C.S.D.N.Y.	affirmed
McElvaine v. Brush	155 (1891)	Fuller	none	none	C.C.S.D.N.Y.	affirmed
Trezza v. Brush	160 (1891)	Fuller	none	none	C.C.S.D.N.Y.	affirmed
Knight v. United States Land Association	161 (1891)	Lamar	Field	none	Cal.	reversed
Maine v. Grand Trunk Railway Company	217 (1891)	Field	none	Bradley	C.C.D. Me.	reversed
Martin v. Gray	236 (1891)	Brewer	none	none	C.C.D. Ky.	affirmed
Deseret Salt Company v. Tarpey	241 (1891)	Field	none	none	Sup. Ct. Terr. Utah	affirmed
Kaukauna Water Power Company v. Green Bay and Mississippi Canal Company	254 (1891)	Brown	none	none	Wis. Cir. Ct.	affirmed
St. Paul, Minneapolis and Manitoba Railway Company v. Todd County	282 (1892)	Fuller	none	none	Minn.	dismissed
Tyler v. Cass County	288 (1892)	Fuller	none	none	N.D.	dismissed
Stutsman County v. Wallace	293 (1892)	Fuller	none	none	Sup. Ct. Terr. Dakota	reversed
Sunflower Oil Company v. Wilson	313 (1892)	Brown	none	none	N.D. Miss.	affirmed
Gisborn v. Charter Oak Life Insurance Company	326 (1892)	Brewer	none	none	Sup. Ct. Terr. Utah	affirmed
Pacific Express Company v. Seibert	339 (1892)	Lamar	none	none	C.C.W.D. Mo.	affirmed
Chaffee County v. Potter	355 (1892)	Lamar	none	none	C.C.D. Colo.	affirmed
Doon Township v. Cummins	366 (1892)	Gray	none	Brown	C.C.N.D. Iowa	reversed
Scott v. Ellery	381 (1892)	Harlan	none	none	C.C.S.D. Iowa	affirmed
Charlotte, Columbia and Augusta Railroad Company v. Gibbes	386 (1892)	Field	none	none	S.C.	affirmed
Wiggins Ferry Company v. Ohio and Mississippi Railway Company	396 (1892)	Brown	none	none	C.C.S.D. Ill.	reversed
Simmons Creek Coal Company v. Doran	417 (1892)	Fuller	none	none	D.W. Va.	affirmed
Boyd v. United States	450 (1892)	Harlan	none	none	C.C.W.D. Ark.	reversed
Fisk v. Henarie	459 (1892)	Fuller	none	Harlan	C.C.D. Or.	reversed
Thompson v. United States	471 (1892)	Brown	none	none	C.C.D. Ky.	affirmed
Ex parte Fassett	479 (1892)	Blatchford	none	none	C.C.S.D.N.Y.	prohibition denied
Eames v. Kaiser	488 (1892)	Fuller	none	none	C.C.N.D. Tex.	reversed
Northern Pacific Railroad Company v. Washington ex rel. Dustin	492 (1892)	Gray	none	Brewer	Sup. Ct. Terr. Wash.	reversed
United States v. Des Moines Navigation and Railway Company	510 (1892)	Brewer	none	none	C.C.N.D. Iowa	affirmed
Counselman v. Hitchcock	547 (1892)	Blatchford	none	none	C.C.N.D. Ill.	reversed
McNee v. Donahue	587 (1892)	Field	none	none	Cal.	affirmed
Phelps v. Siegfried	602 (1892)	Fuller	none	none	C.C.N.D. Cal.	reversed
Magone v. Rosenstein	604 (1892)	Fuller	none	none	C.C.S.D.N.Y.	affirmed
Kennedy v. KcKee	606 (1892)	Harlan	none	none	C.C.N.D. Tex.	affirmed
United States v. Alabama Great Southern Railroad Company	615 (1892)	Brown	none	none	Ct. Cl.	affirmed
South Branch Lumber Company v. Ott	622 (1892)	Brewer	none	none	C.C.S.D. Iowa	affirmed
Delaware City, Salem & Philadelphia Steamboat Navigation Company v. Reybold	636 (1892)	Lamar	none	none	Del.	dismissed
Petri v. Commercial National Bank	644 (1892)	Fuller	none	none	C.C.N.D. Tex.	affirmed
Nishimura Ekiu v. United States	651 (1892)	Gray	none	none	C.C.N.D. Cal.	affirmed
Bird v. Benlisa	664 (1892)	Brewer	none	none	C.C.N.D. Fla.	affirmed
Convers v. Atchison, Topeka and Santa Fe Railway Company	671 (1892)	Brewer	none	none	C.C.N.D. Ill.	reversed
Hedden v. Iselin	676 (1892)	Blatchford	none	none	C.C.S.D.N.Y.	affirmed
Clark v. Sidway	682 (1892)	Blatchford	none	none	C.C.N.D. Ill.	affirmed
Home Benefit Association v. Sargent	691 (1892)	Blatchford	none	Brown	C.C.S.D.N.Y.	affirmed
