= Workman v. Mingo County Board of Education =

- Court: United States Court of Appeals for the Fourth Circuit
- Decided: March 22 2011
- Citation: 419 Fed. Appx. 348

Case history
- Subsequent history: Cert. denied, 565 U.S. 1036 (2011)

Court membership
- Judges sitting: James Andrew Wynn, G. Steven Agee, Patrick Michael Duffy

Case opinions
- Majority: Wynn, joined by Agee and Duffy

Laws applied
- Free Exercise Clause, Equal Protection, substantive due process

Workman v. Mingo County Board of Education, 419 Fed. Appx. 348 (4th Cir. 2011), was a decision of the United States Court of Appeals for the Fourth Circuit holding that the state of West Virginia is not constitutionally required to provide a religious exemption to mandatory vaccination for school attendance. The court upheld West Virginia's long-standing statutory scheme, which permits only medical exemptions, concluding that it does not violate the Free Exercise Clause or the Equal Protection Clause of the Fourteenth Amendment. The opinion was authored by judge James Andrew Wynn, joined by judge G. Steven Agee and senior district judge Patrick Michael Duffy.

In Workman v. Mingo County (a case challenging West Virginia's law granting only medical exemptions), the plaintiff argued that Smith "preserved an exception for education-related laws that burden religion". Noting a circuit split over the validity of the hybrid rights theory, the Fourth Circuit declined to decide the issue “because, even assuming for the sake of argument that strict scrutiny applies, prior decisions from the Supreme Court guide us to conclude that West Virginia’s vaccination laws withstand such scrutiny".

== Background ==
At the time of the lawsuit, West Virginia law required schoolchildren to be vaccinated against certain communicable diseases as a condition of enrollment, providing an exemption only for medical contraindications. The statute did not recognize religious or philosophical exemptions.

Jennifer Workman, the plaintiff, "said her faith as a member of the Bapticostal Church prohibited her from subjecting her younger daughter, born in 2002, to any medical harm". She did this because she attributed her older daughter's developmental disability to an adverse response to a vaccination. Workman "obtained a certificate from a child psychiatrist, exempting her from the vaccines". The Exemption was denied; "Mingo County School District, in West Virginia, turned down the request on the advice of the state health department". Workman "was forced to home-school her daughter, according to her lawsuit, filed in April 2009 in the U.S. District Court for the Southern District of West Virginia". Her Suit claimed that "denial of 'religious accommodation' violated her rights to free exercise of religion and equal protection under the First and 14th amendments".

Without going to trial, the lower court dismissed her case. In 2009, the district court "granted summary judgment to the school district on 11th Amendment immunity grounds".

== Decision of the Fourth Circuit ==
The Fourth Circuit panel unanimously upheld the West Virginia vaccination mandate as not unconstitutionally infringing Workman's First Amendment rights to free exercise of religion. The decision stated that "It has been settled law for many years that claims of religious freedom must give way in the face of the compelling interest of society in fighting the spread of contagious diseases through mandatory inoculation programs". The Supreme Court of the United States declined to hear an appeal of the ruling.

== Later developments ==
Workman has been cited by courts and commentators as a leading modern federal appellate decision addressing the constitutionality of vaccine mandates that do not include religious exemptions.

In Phillips v. City of New York, the United States Court of Appeals for the Second Circuit cited Workman in holding that mandatory vaccination as a condition of school attendance does not violate the Free Exercise Clause. While the Second Circuit did not treat the Supreme Court precedent of Jacobson v. Massachusetts as directly controlling, it relied on its reasoning, along with Prince v. Massachusetts and Workman, in rejecting the plaintiffs' constitutional challenge.

In litigation challenging California Senate Bill 277, which eliminated that state’s religious exemption for school immunization requirements, courts relied on Workman and similar cases in concluding that federal constitutional law does not require such exemptions:

The SB 277 courts ruled that a religious exemption was not required under our federal jurisprudence. In that, they followed the latest federal courts to examine vaccine mandates—Workman v. Mingo County Bd. of Ed. and Phillips v. City of New York.

Following Workman, West Virginia for many years continued to deny non-medical exemptions from school vaccination requirements. Bills were regularly introduced in the state legislature to add religious or philosophical exemptions, but did not pass. For example, Senate Bill 535, introduced in 2023, proposed to amend West Virginia Code § 16-3-4 to create religious and philosophical exemptions for school vaccines, but did not advance out of committee. In 2023 the West Virginia Legislature enacted the Equal Protection for Religion Act (EPRA), a state-level religious-freedom statute instructing courts to apply heightened scrutiny to laws burdening religious exercise. In 2025 the U.S. Department of Health and Human Services' Office for Civil Rights cited EPRA in a letter discussing how West Virginia's compulsory vaccination law interacts with federal programs and religious-exemption claims, asserting that EPRA requires recognition of religious exemptions from the state's vaccination law in certain contexts. As of December 2025, the question was being litigated.
