= Compagnie Francaise de Navigation a Vapeur v. Louisiana Board of Health =

1902 U.S. Supreme Court case holding state quarantine laws constitutional

- Supreme Court of the United States

Argued October 29–30, 1900 Decided June 2, 1902
- Full case name: Compagnie Francaise de Navigation a Vapeur v. Louisiana Board of Health
- Citations: 186 U.S. 380 (more) 22 S. Ct. 811; 46 L. Ed. 1209

Case history
- Prior: Compagnie Francaise de Navigation à Vapeur v. State Board of Health, 25 So. 591 (La. 1899)

Holding
- State quarantine law is reasonable exercise of police power in absence of federal preemption, and does not impermissibly affect interstate commerce nor violate Equal Protection, Due Process clauses or treaties with foreign governments. Louisiana Supreme Court affirmed.

Court membership
- Chief Justice Melville Fuller Associate Justices John M. Harlan · Horace Gray; David J. Brewer · Henry B. Brown; George Shiras Jr. · Edward D. White; Rufus W. Peckham · Joseph McKenna

Case opinions
- Majority: White, joined by Fuller, Gray, Brewer, Shiras, Peckham, McKenna
- Dissent: Brown, joined by Harlan

Laws applied
- U.S. Const. art. I sec. 8 clause 3 and Amdt. XIV, various treaties with foreign states

Compagnie Francaise de Navigation a Vapeur v. Louisiana Board of Health, 186 U.S. 380 (1902), was a United States Supreme Court case which held constitutional state laws requiring the involuntary quarantine of individuals to prevent the spread of disease. Louisiana's quarantine laws, Justice Edward White said, were a reasonable exercise of the state's police power that conflicted with neither the Dormant Commerce Clause nor the Due Process Clause of the Fourteenth Amendment. In dissent, Justice Henry Billings Brown, joined by John Marshall Harlan, agreed that while quarantine laws were constitutional, Louisiana's went beyond the scope of the state's authority over interstate commerce, even violating several treaties between the United States and other nations.

The case had arisen in 1898, when the S.S. Britannia sailed from Palermo to Marseille, then across the Atlantic for New Orleans. Before docking there, it had stopped at a state-run quarantine station further down the Mississippi River, where all 408 passengers, most of whom were Italian immigrants, were certified as free from disease. At New Orleans, however, the ship was not allowed to land them there nor in any nearby parish, as it was told that a cordon sanitaire had been declared on land, forbidding the entry of any uninfected persons into the area.

Compagnie Française de Navigation à Vapeur ("French Steam Navigation Company", in English), the Britannia's French owner, filed for a restraining order in Orleans Parish District Court enjoining the state Board of Health from enforcing the quarantine, arguing that the real purpose of the quarantine was to prevent the immigrants from landing in New Orleans; after the court declined the Britannia took its passengers to Pensacola, Florida, to be unloaded and then returned to New Orleans to deliver its cargo. The company's complaint against the state for damages was dismissed, a decision upheld by the Louisiana Supreme Court on appeal.

Quarantine laws had never been challenged, but dicta in the Court's opinions since Gibbons v. Ogden in 1824 had recognized them as a justifiable use of state power. Some earlier cases had challenged aspects of quarantine laws such as the taxes collected to fund them, but Compagnie Francaise challenged the application of quarantine law itself, under the provisions of the Fourteenth Amendment. It has been cited by later courts as holding involuntary quarantines constitutional, as recently as a case arising from the 2014 African Ebola epidemic and the COVID-19 pandemic.

== Background ==
Starting in 1796, when it was under Spanish colonial administration, New Orleans began suffering outbreaks of yellow fever every few years, and reported cases every summer. Death tolls began increasing, both from the disease and some then-common treatments for it (such as mercury injections), as the city's population grew following its return to French rule in 1800 and cession to the United States as part of the Louisiana Purchase three years later. The first American territorial governor, William C. C. Claiborne, lost two wives and his daughter to the disease, which he himself also contracted but recovered from.

Many other migrants from elsewhere in the U.S. followed; they proved more susceptible to yellow fever than longtime residents. An 1817 outbreak killed 800 in New Orleans alone, prompting the state legislature to create a New Orleans Board of Health, the first government public health agency in the U.S., only to dissolve it two years later as ineffectual after an outbreak that year claimed 2,000 lives. These deaths were often exacerbated by local newspapers' refusal to report on the disease, as businesses feared the economic effects of a public panic. It was not known that yellow fever was transmitted via mosquitos until Walter Reed's research in 1901; before then, the most common theory blamed infection on atmospheric miasma.

After an 1853 outbreak left almost 8,000 (Note: Some later estimates put the true death toll closer to 12,000.) residents of New Orleans dead, the state again created a Board of Health and made it permanent. The Union Navy's blockade of New Orleans six years later, as the Civil War began, the city for the first time in the century recorded no deaths from yellow fever. When General Benjamin Butler took over control of the city when it fell to Union forces in 1862, he went further, dispatching 2,000 troops to dispose of the city's garbage and instituting a quarantine requirement for arriving ships. At a point 70 miles (110 km) down the Mississippi River from the city, all vessels were stopped by gunboats and held for 40 days while they were monitored for disease. There were few deaths from yellow fever in New Orleans for the remainder of the war.

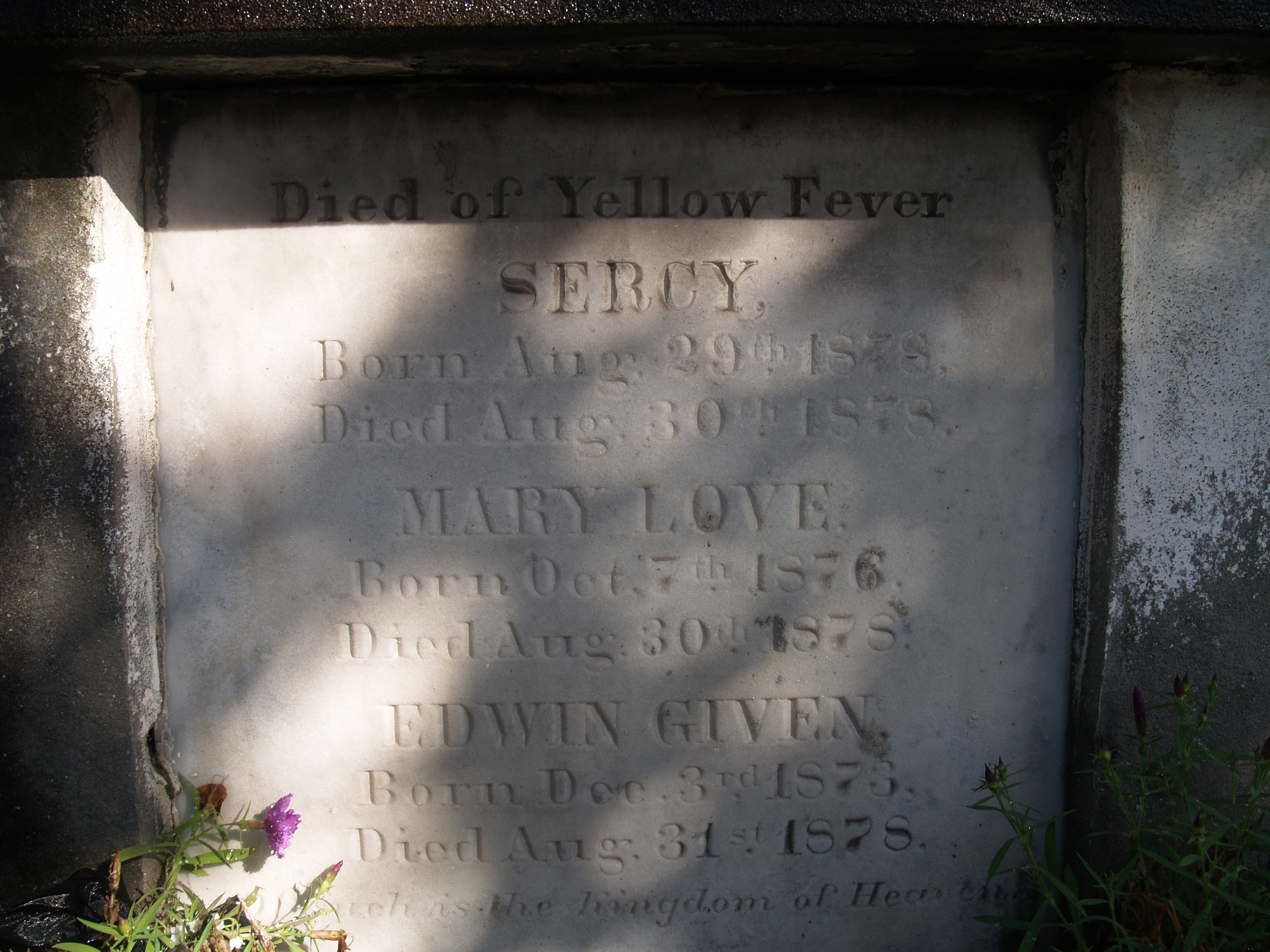
Gravestone for family killed by 1878 yellow fever outbreak in New Orleans

Yellow fever epidemics in the city resumed after the war, when an 1867 outbreak killed 3,000. During this one the Board of Health was active, putting quarantine flags on houses with known cases and fumigating spaces. The 1878 outbreak, which afflicted cities in the Lower Mississippi Valley as far north as Memphis, Tennessee, led the newspapers to abandon their past practice of downplaying outbreaks to avoid public panics since, they realized, it had actually made the epidemics worse.

Businesses, particularly shipping companies, still chafed at the quarantine laws. In 1882 the Louisiana legislature amended the statutes to require that vessels stopping at the quarantine station pay as much as $30 ($1000 in today's dollars) in fees, depending on their size, with the proceeds going to fund the board's operations and infrastructure. One New Orleans–based shipper challenged this in court as a tonnage tax, which they called an unconstitutional violation of the Commerce Clause since the federal government alone had authority to levy one; they further alleged that it was being used for the city of New Orleans' general revenue rather than its stated purpose.

Four years later, the shipper's case reached the U.S. Supreme Court on appeal from its state counterpart. Unanimously, the nine justices held that the fee was not a tax and even if it were one, would still have been constitutional as while the federal government had the authority to require and enforce quarantines, it was only exclusive to it if it actually did so. As it had historically left that to the states, Louisiana could act as it saw fit within the Constitution to exercise its police power and protect public health.

"If there is a city in the United States which has need of quarantine laws, it is New Orleans", Justice Samuel Freeman Miller, a physician prior to his legal career, wrote for the Court. He noted that despite being a hundred miles (160 km) upriver from the Gulf of Mexico, it was the largest and busiest port on that waterbody. Many of the ships that came to New Orleans from the Gulf often came from warmer countries to the south, where tropical diseases were common, and past epidemics of yellow fever and cholera in the Mississippi Valley had all been identified as having spread from the city.

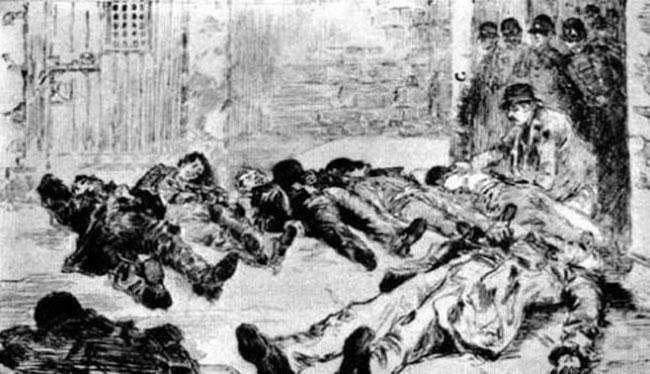
Illustration of bodies of lynched Italian immigrants after 1891 incident

Around that time Italian immigrants began arriving in New Orleans in great numbers; eventually the city would be home to more of them than any other in the South. They were met with considerable fear and prejudice from longtime residents; in 1891, an angry mob lynched 11 Italians, one of the largest mass lynchings in U.S. history, after the city's popular police chief was killed, supposedly implicating Italians with his last words. Among the many reasons the Italian immigrants were considered undesirable was the belief that they brought diseases into the U.S.

In September 1897 a yellow fever outbreak believed to have originated in Ocean Springs, Mississippi, spread to New Orleans, where it led to a single death and several cases. The Louisiana Board of Health initiated quarantines on any travelers returning to New Orleans from Ocean Springs or neighboring Biloxi, ordering railroads not to stop there on the way to New Orleans, and fumigating all luggage that travelers had brought back. It told the newspapers that it was willing to spend a million dollars to contain the outbreak.

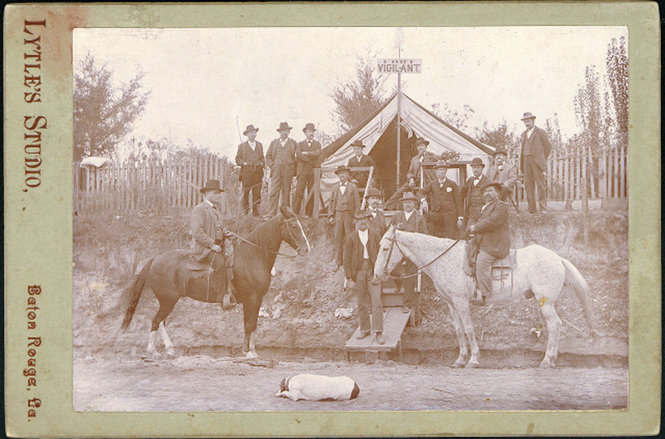
Quarantine camp in Louisiana during 1897 outbreak

The house quarantines ordered by the Board of Health, enforced by armed guards, aroused resentment in New Orleans. Despite the possibility of prison for violators, some quarantined residents began sneaking out of their back doors at night. Elsewhere in the state, fear of the disease led to violence. In Rayne a band of armed residents prevented a train from entering their parish. A group in Calcasieu Parish burned a rail bridge near Lake Charles with similar aims of controlling disease.

== Underlying dispute ==
A year after the 1897 outbreak, the SS Britannia, owned by the French corporation Compagnie Française de Navigation á Vapeur, left the Sicilian port of Palermo carrying cargo and Italian emigrants, along with some returning U.S. citizens. After stopping in Marseille to pick up more passengers and cargo, it sailed across the Atlantic Ocean into the Gulf of Mexico, and up the Mississippi River. In late September, the vessel duly stopped at the quarantine station, near Fort Jackson, where all 408 passengers and the ship's cargo were certified as free from disease and allowed to continue to New Orleans.

Two days later, when the Britannia reached its destination, port officials told the crew it could not unload any passengers. In the interim, the state's Board of Health had placed New Orleans and the neighboring parishes (Note: Specifically, the order named the parishes of Orleans, St. Bernard, Jefferson (right bank), St. Tammany, Plaquemines, St. Charles, or St. John) within a hundred miles under a cordon sanitaire forbidding the entry of any uninfected persons, a measure the state legislature had authorized the board to take earlier that year. The Britannia's crew were reportedly additionally told that if they landed anywhere outside of the quarantined area with the intention of offloading their passengers, those areas would be added to the quarantine.

The company's agents in New Orleans filed a petition in Orleans Parish District Court for a restraining order enjoining the state from enforcing the quarantine against the Britannia's passengers, and a judgement of $2,500 against the board and its members in solido. They argued the state's real objective had been to prevent it from landing Italian immigrants, noting that the board had taken no measures to prevent the entry into New Orleans of Italian immigrants who had disembarked at New York and taken the train to Louisiana, and had allowed other large groups to enter the city later. After the court dismissed the petition for failure to show cause, the Britannia took its passengers to Pensacola, Florida, to put off and returned to New Orleans, where it unloaded its cargo. The company refiled its action as a damage claim, increasing its requested judgement to $11,000 and naming the individual board members as defendants.

In this filing the company alleged that Act 192 of the Laws of 1898, authorizing the cordon sanitaire, violated a provision of the recently adopted state constitution requiring that laws have one goal clearly specified by a title, and in this case the title limited the act to applying to travel within the state, not vessels arriving from outside the state or country. Its application to an international arrival, they argued, also violated the Commerce Clause of the United States Constitution, since only Congress could regulate foreign commerce, and was also banned by treaties with France and Italy, from whence the Britannia had come. Lastly, the company argued, the order barring the landing of the passengers was a denial of its equal protection and due process rights under the Fourteenth Amendment.

Again, the district court dismissed the case after the board of health made a peremptory plea arguing no cause of action existed for Compagnie Francaise. The company appealed the decision to the Louisiana Supreme Court.

== Louisiana Supreme Court ==
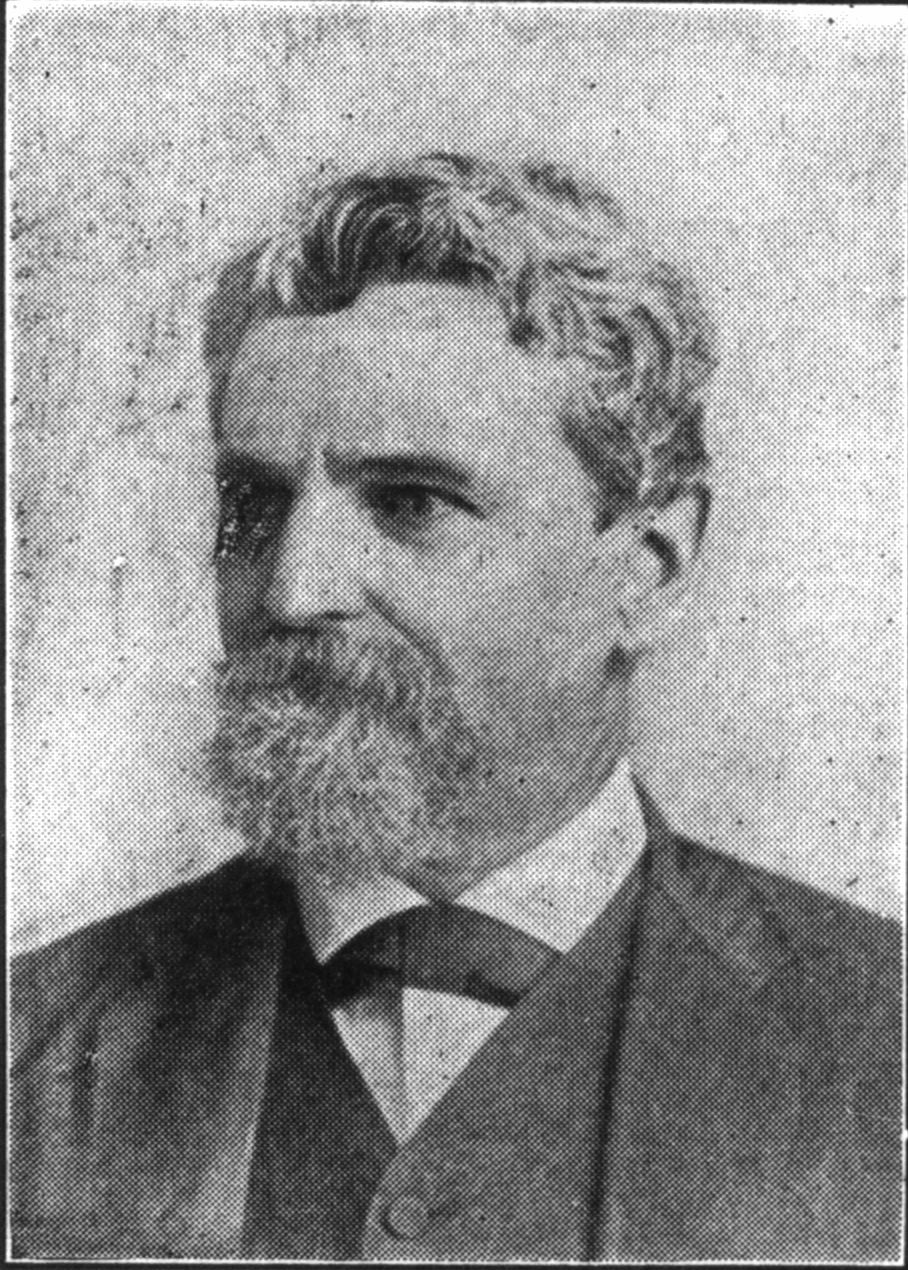
Francis T. Nicholls

In March 1899 the state's Supreme Court reached its decision in the case. Chief Justice Francis T. Nicholls, a former governor of the state, wrote for a unanimous court affirming the district court.

Nicholls started with the state constitutional claim, and the presumption that the legislature intended Act 192 to be in accordance with the state constitution. He found its title had several clauses which could justify the power to declare and establish a cordon sanitaire, and reiterated another recent holding of the court that the titles of bills need only state the general purpose of the act rather than the enumerated specifics. The language of the act was broad enough to allow the board to impose the measure, as well, even if it did not specifically mention it. "[It] does not limit the board to prohibiting the introduction of persons from one portion of the state to ... an infected portion" Nicholls wrote, "but evidently looks as well to the prohibition of the introduction of persons from outside the state into any infected portion of the state"; it would defeat the purpose of the quarantine were it held to bar entry into an afflicted area only to those attempting to enter it from elsewhere in the state, he suggested.

The company had also argued that Act 192 did not give the board any powers beyond those previous legislation had granted it. Nicholls dismissed this contention as in direct contradiction to the stated purpose and language of the act, noting also that the legislature had had a good reason. During the 1897 outbreak, Italian emigrants had continued to arrive in New Orleans by boat, but despite "excited public discussions", the board had concluded it lacked the power to prevent their entry at the time. In September 1898, the board had also been considering the possibility of increased travel to the United States through New Orleans from the Caribbean in the aftermath of the Spanish–American War.

Lastly Nicholls considered the federal questions the company had raised. He found them as baseless as their arguments about the language of Act 192. A decade earlier, he wrote, the U.S. Supreme Court had rejected a claim that the Fourteenth Amendment changed in any way the states' police power to protect public health and safety, from what the Court had recognized in 1824's Gibbons v. Ogden. Nicholls quoted at length from Chief Justice Melville Fuller's opinion for a unanimous Court in In re Rahrer, to the effect that the police power "is a power originally and always belonging to the states ... [and] is not interfered with by the Fourteenth Amendment."

Nicholls found Compagnie Française's due process arguments "utterly untenable" as the board's action was necessary under the law; he wondered rhetorically what else it could have done. The passengers had been inconvenienced, he agreed, and the company forced to incur extra expenses, but that was damnum absque injuria, meaning it could not recover from the state. Nicholls did not give much credence to the company's claim it had been specifically targeted, either, since it had merely been the first ship so excluded and "there is no reason to suspect that [the order] would not have been executed against any other ship or ships which might fall under its terms."

== Supreme Court ==
Compagnie Française filed a certiorari petition asking the U.S. Supreme Court to hear the case on appeal. It was granted and the Court heard oral arguments in October 1900. At the end of the Court's following term, 20 months later, it handed down its decision affirming the Louisiana Supreme Court. While all nine justices agreed that quarantines were an acceptable use of the police power, they differed on whether Louisiana's exercise of it in this instance had been a permissible use of it. Justice Edward Douglass White, a Louisiana native who would later serve as Chief Justice, wrote for himself and six colleagues in the majority, while Justice Henry Billings Brown's dissent was joined by John Marshall Harlan.

=== Majority opinion ===
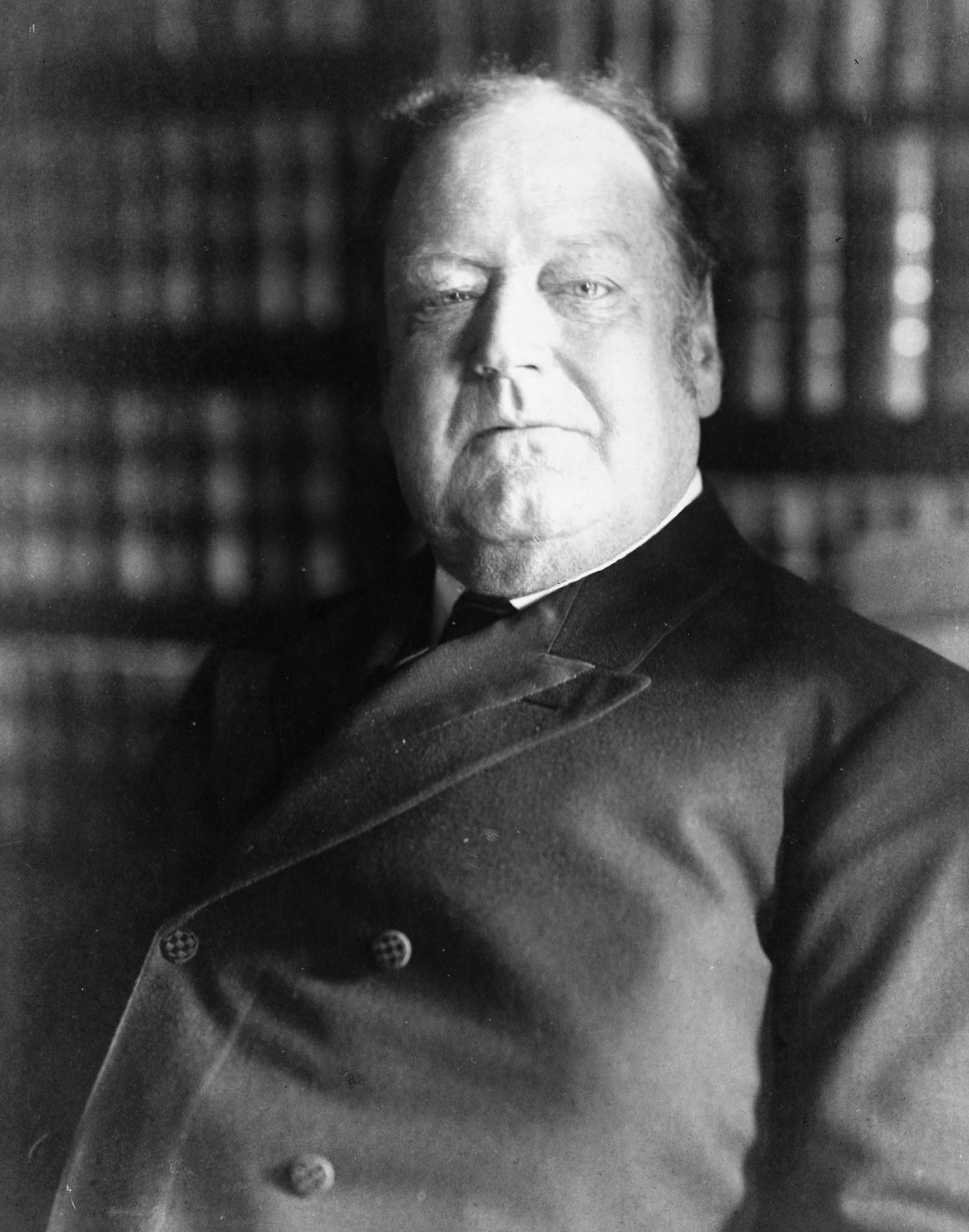
Justice White in 1905, three years after Compagnie Francaise

After reiterating the facts of the case and the Louisiana Supreme Court's holdings, Justice White reduced the company's case to four arguments that were before the U.S. Supreme Court. He decided to treat the first two, the alleged Commerce Clause and Fourteenth Amendment violations, singly since they both involved the U.S. Constitution. The first, White argued, had been dealt with at length in Morgan's Steamship Company, the 1886 case, from which he quoted extensively, holding that the states were free to enact and enforce quarantine laws unless Congress decided to preempt them, a holding the Court had reaffirmed in 1900.

Compagnie Française had offered "a most copious reference" to cases where the Court had held states to have overreached into Congress's domain in their regulations of commerce, White observed. Rather than review them all exhaustively, White wrote, it was enough to say they were "inapposite". The petitioners' primary error was in using as examples laws that excluded from a state objects which might carry disease, such as "criminals, diseased persons and things, and paupers", were not regulating "legitimate" commerce and were thus constitutional. That was true in some of those cases, but, White countered, "this implies no limitation on the power to regulate by health laws the subjects of legitimate commerce."

Since Act 192 had been constitutional, White continued, it could also not have acted to violate the company's due process rights. "[T]he contention demonstrates its own unsoundness", he wrote, since it amounted to a theory that either the Fourteenth Amendment had eliminated the police power, or had rendered it unusable. "In other words," he characterized this argument, "that the lawful powers of government which the Constitution has conferred may not be exerted without bringing about a violation of the Constitution."

Likewise, the treaties Louisiana had allegedly violated "were not intended to, and did not, deprive the government of the United States of those powers necessarily inhering in it and essential to the health and safety of its people" since they would have deprived the federal government, as much as the states, of taking those actions, White wrote. Compagnie Française had in particular pointed to a treaty concluded with Greece, that had provided in part that Greek vessels coming to the U.S. would carry a certificate from authorities at the point of departure that its passengers and cargo were disease-free. But, White noted, the same section of the treaty allowed for local authorities to quarantine the ship on arrival, either as part of a general measure or if it specifically was found to have sick passengers. The documentation from Greece could not in any event be expected to exempt them since authorities there could not make any determinations about the health of the passengers at the port of arrival.

The last of the company's four arguments was that Act 192 was superseded by federal immigration law, specifically an 1893 act of Congress expanding the quarantine powers of the Marine Hospital Service. "So far as the act of 1893 is concerned," White responded, "it is manifest that it did not contemplate the overthrow of the existing state quarantine systems and the abrogation of the powers on the subject of health and quarantine exercised by the states". He declined to go into detail, but included a footnote reprinting a section of the act that directs the service's supervising surgeon general to "cooperate with and aid state and municipal boards of health in the execution and enforcement of the rules and regulations of such boards".

=== Dissenting opinion ===
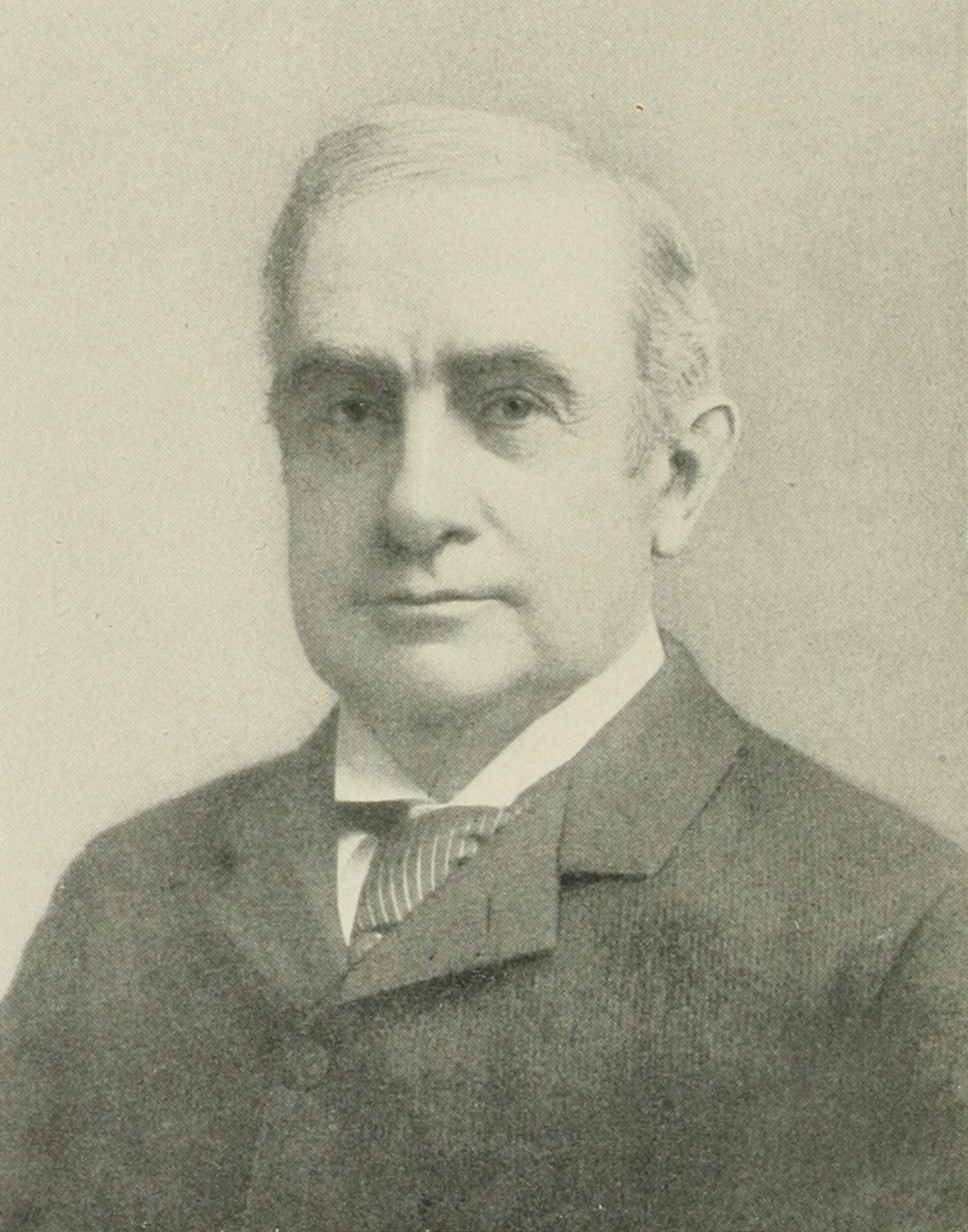
Justice Brown, in 1899

While he agreed that the power of states to impose quarantines is "so well settled by repeated decisions of this Court as to be no longer open to doubt", Justice Brown did not think the cordon sanitaire declared by the board was "a necessary or proper exercise of the police power". Preventing the entry of healthy individuals into quarantined areas did not seem to him to serve to curtail a disease's spread, but rather to reduce the likelihood that they would become infected in the quarantine area. "This is a danger not to the population, but to the immigrants", Brown wrote. "It seems to me that this is a possibility too remote to justify the drastic measure of a total exclusion of all classes of immigrants."

The Court should have looked not to Morgan's as a precedent, Brown argued, but instead to an earlier case, Railroad Company v. Husen, which the majority was "directly in the teeth of". In that 1877 case, the Court unanimously struck down a Missouri law forbidding the transport into the state of any cattle from Texas, Mexico or an Indian reservation (Note: Cattle from those jurisdictions could be transported through the state on steamboats or railcar) from March through October of every year in order to prevent the illness then known as Spanish or Mexican fever from infecting local cattle as an impermissible regulation of interstate commerce, since it did not distinguish between sick and healthy cattle. "The statute was held to be a plain intrusion upon the exclusive domain of Congress, that it was not a quarantine law, not an inspection law, and was objectionable because it prohibited the introduction of cattle no matter whether they may do an injury to the inhabitants of a state or not." Brown noted that the state supreme courts of California and Maine had held similarly when faced with such cases.

Brown also believed that the exclusion of the Britannia from New Orleans was in conflict with the treaties. The same section of the treaty with Greece that the majority had relied on in dismissing the petitioners' argument also had a provision he quoted, stating that ships with the required documentation from health officers at the port of embarkation were free from disease "shall be subjected to no other quarantine than such as may be necessary for the visit of the health officer of the port where such vessels shall have arrived, after which said vessels shall be allowed immediately to enter and unload their cargoes." If the cordon sanitaire did not violate that provision, Brown concluded, "I am unable to conceive a state of facts which would" since the Constitution did not grant states the power to pass laws that conflicted with foreign treaties.

== Subsequent jurisprudence and commentary ==
No courts have revisited, reconsidered or modified Compagnie Francaise since it was handed down. It is cited in later opinions and commentary as holding constitutional the power to quarantine. The Supreme Court referred to it as such, quoting it at length, in 1913's Minnesota Rate Cases It has also been cited that way in a Minnesota Law Review article. In 2016 New Jersey federal district judge Kevin McNulty cited Compagnie Francaise, among other cases, in holding that existing case law on quarantines was sufficient to sustain state officials' defense of qualified immunity in a suit against them brought by Kaci Hickox, a nurse quarantined for 80 hours after she showed a fever upon her return to Newark International Airport from Sierra Leone, where she had been treating victims of the 2014 Ebola outbreak. "I do not find that prior quarantine case law establishes any unconstitutionality" in how she was dealt with, McNulty wrote.

Four years later, as the possibility of that year's COVID-19 pandemic coming to the U.S. loomed, The Atlantic cited Compagnie Francaise as establishing the broad nature of the quarantine power, "the most extreme use of government power over people who have committed no crime." It noted that, as it was at that time, the federal government still largely delegates that power to state and local authorities, which it was concerned could complicate a centralized response to any outbreak.

During the pandemic, Michigan Court of Claims Chief Judge Christopher Murray dismissed a challenge to Governor Gretchen Whitmer's stay-at-home order. He noted that contrary to the petitioners' claim that the Supreme Court had never held restrictions on the movements of healthy individuals during a pandemic constitutional, it had done just that in Compagnie Francaise.

== See also ==
- 1902 in the United States
- List of United States Supreme Court cases
- List of United States Supreme Court cases, volume 186
- List of United States Supreme Court cases by the Fuller Court
- Jacobson v. Massachusetts, case three years later where the Supreme Court upheld laws requiring vaccination.
- Zucht v. King, 1922 case holding constitutional the exclusion of unvaccinated children from public schools
