= Phillips v. City of New York =

American legal case

- Court: United States Court of Appeals for the Second Circuit
- Argued: January 5, 2015
- Decided: January 7, 2015
- Citation: 775 F.3d 538

Court membership
- Judges sitting: Gerard E. Lynch, Denny Chin, Edward R. Korman

Case opinions
- Majority: Per curiam

Phillips v. City of New York, 775 F.3d 538 (2nd Cir. 2015), cert. denied, 136 S. Ct. 104 (2015), was a 2015 decision of the United States Court of Appeals for the Second Circuit addressing vaccination mandates and exemptions from them in New York City. The court concluded that it was within the constitutional police power of the state to mandate vaccination, and that religious exemptions were not constitutionally required. Therefore, even though the state did permit religious exemptions, it was free to provide them with limitations including the exclusion of exempted children from school during an outbreak of the disease, and requiring applicants to demonstrate the sincerity of their religious objection in order to receive an exemption.

The case was later cited as precedent in upholding New York's repeal of religious exemptions in 2019, and is noted to have contributed to the upholding of other laws including California Senate Bill 277.

== Background ==
The case consolidated several district court cases involving parents either seeking religious exemptions from vaccination, or seeking to permit their exempt, and therefore unvaccinated, children to attend school during an outbreak. At the trial court level, Phillips was considered to be the "first case to challenge New York's social distancing policy".

Judge William F. Kuntz II "granted summary judgment for the defendants, relying heavily on an earlier decision of the Second Circuit, Caviezel v. Great Neck Public Schools".

== Decision ==
The court held that no constitutional violation occurred when unvaccinated students who were exempt from vaccination due to a religious objection were nonetheless excluded from school during a declared disease outbreak. The court further held that no constitutional violation occurred where a religious exemption was denied to an applicant whose stated reasons for seeking such an exemption were based on a personal fear of vaccines rather than an objection based on religious belief.

Constitutional scholar Eugene Volokh wrote that Phillips "reaffirms that the government may mandate vaccinations. It may mandate vaccinations for everyone, and it can certainly mandate them for everyone who goes to public school." Volokh approved of the opinion, saying that "there may indeed be a presumptive constitutional right to be free from unwanted medical treatment, but such a right can be trumped by the very strong public interest in preventing people from becoming unwitting carriers of deadly illness".

In Phillips, the trial court found that one plaintiff who sought such a religious exemption was not entitled to it because her "objections to vaccinations were not based on religious beliefs".

== See also ==
- Jacobson v. Massachusetts, U.S. Supreme Court ruling on vaccine mandates
- Bruesewitz v. Wyeth, U.S. Supreme Court ruling on vaccine defect claims
- California Senate Bill 277
- Childhood immunizations in the United States
- Health in the United States
- Jonas Salk, virologist
- Maurice Hilleman, microbiologist who studied vaccinology
- Measles resurgence in the United States
- National Childhood Vaccine Injury Act
- Public health intervention
- Vaccination Act
- Vaccination and religion
- Vaccination policy in the United States
- Vaccine hesitancy
- Zucht v. King, U.S. Supreme Court ruling on public schools and vaccine requirements
