= Zucht v. King =

Rosalyn Zucht, W. A. King, et al.
- Supreme Court of the United States

Argued October 20, 1922 Decided November 13, 1922
- Full case name: Zucht v. King
- Citations: 260 U.S. 174 (more) 43 S. Ct. 24; 67 L. Ed. 194

Holding
- School districts could constitutionally exclude unvaccinated students.

Court membership
- Chief Justice William H. Taft Associate Justices Joseph McKenna · Oliver W. Holmes Jr. Willis Van Devanter · Mahlon Pitney; James C. McReynolds · Louis Brandeis; George Sutherland

Case opinion
- Majority: Brandeis, joined by unanimous

Zucht v. King, 260 U.S. 174 (1922), is a landmark decision by the Supreme Court of the United States in which the Court unanimously held that public schools could constitutionally exclude unvaccinated students from attending, even if there was not an ongoing outbreak. In the case, the school district of San Antonio, Texas enacted an ordinance that prohibited any child from attending a school within the district unless they had been vaccinated against smallpox. One parent of a student who had been excluded, Rosalyn Zucht, sued on the basis that there was not a public health emergency. Justice Louis Brandeis wrote for the unanimous court that requiring students to be vaccinated was a justified use of "police power" to maintain public health and safety.

Brandeis invoked a previous decision, Jacobson v. Massachusetts (1905), in which the Court upheld the authority of the states to enforce compulsory vaccination laws.

== Opinion ==
The city of San Antonio, Texas, enacted an ordinance prohibiting any child from attending a public school or other places of education without having first presented a certificate of vaccination for smallpox. Consequently, Rosalyn Zucht was excluded from both public and private schools due to her refusal to receive a vaccination. Zucht sued, asserting that there was no emergency requiring vaccination and that she was deprived of liberty without due process of law by effectively making vaccination compulsory. The Texas state courts denied her claims, and she appealed to the United States Supreme Court.

In a brief opinion, the Court noted that in the previous case of Jacobson v. Massachusetts, the Court "had settled that it is within the police power of a state to provide for compulsory vaccination". The Court found no reason to question the fairness with which the city ordinance was applied in this case, and found that the ordinance reflected the broad discretion needed by authorities to protect the public health. The Court also noted that although the plaintiff asserted an equal protection violation, she had not articulated any impermissible discrimination that would invoke that doctrine, leaving nothing for the Court to examine with respect to such a claim.

== See also ==
- 1905 in the United States
- 1922 in the United States
- List of United States Supreme Court cases
- List of United States Supreme Court cases, volume 260
- List of United States Supreme Court cases by the Taft Court
- Compagnie Francaise de Navigation a Vapeur v. Louisiana Board of Health, 1902 case in which the Court had upheld quarantine laws as a reasonable exercise of police power
- Prince v. Massachusetts
