= Caviezel =

Caviezel is a Romansh surname. Notable people with the surname include:

- Dario Caviezel (born 1995), Swiss snowboarder
- Gino Caviezel (born 1992), Swiss alpine skier
- Gion Caviezel (1936-2004), Swiss bobsledder
- Jim Caviezel (born 1968), American film actor
- Mauro Caviezel (born 1988), Swiss alpine skier

== See also ==
- Caviezel v. Great Neck Public Schools, a 2012 vaccine law case
