= State power =

State power may refer to:

- The extroverted concept of power in international relations
- The introverted concept of political power within a society
  - The power of a sovereign state to exercise authority within its borders
  - Social influence
  - Coercion
- Police power (United States constitutional law), the capacity of a state to regulate behaviours and enforce order within its territory
