= List of United States Supreme Court cases, volume 197 =

Supreme Court of the United States
- Interactive map of Supreme Court of the United States
- 38°53′26″N 77°00′16″W
- Established: March 4, 1789; 236 years ago
- Location: Washington, D.C.
- Coordinates: 38°53′26″N 77°00′16″W
- Composition method: Presidential nomination with Senate confirmation
- Authorised by: Constitution of the United States, Art. III, § 1
- Judge term length: life tenure, subject to impeachment and removal
- Number of positions: 9 (by statute)
- Website: supremecourt.gov

This is a list of cases reported in volume 197 of United States Reports, decided by the Supreme Court of the United States in 1905.

== Justices of the Supreme Court at the time of volume 197 U.S. ==
The Supreme Court is established by Article III, Section 1 of the Constitution of the United States, which says: "The judicial Power of the United States, shall be vested in one supreme Court . . .". The size of the Court is not specified; the Constitution leaves it to Congress to set the number of justices. Under the Judiciary Act of 1789 Congress originally fixed the number of justices at six (one chief justice and five associate justices). Since 1789 Congress has varied the size of the Court from six to seven, nine, ten, and back to nine justices (always including one chief justice).

When the cases in volume 197 were decided the Court comprised the following nine members:

Portrait	Justice	Office	Home State	Succeeded	Date confirmed by the Senate (Vote)	Tenure on Supreme Court
	Melville Fuller	Chief Justice	Illinois	Morrison Waite	July 20, 1888 (41–20)	October 8, 1888 – July 4, 1910 (Died)
	John Marshall Harlan	Associate Justice	Kentucky	David Davis	November 29, 1877 (Acclamation)	December 10, 1877 – October 14, 1911 (Died)
	David Josiah Brewer	Associate Justice	Kansas	Stanley Matthews	December 18, 1889 (53–11)	January 6, 1890 – March 28, 1910 (Died)
	Henry Billings Brown	Associate Justice	Michigan	Samuel Freeman Miller	December 29, 1890 (Acclamation)	January 5, 1891 – May 28, 1906 (Retired)
	Edward Douglass White	Associate Justice	Louisiana	Samuel Blatchford	February 19, 1894 (Acclamation)	March 12, 1894 – December 18, 1910 (Continued as chief justice)
	Rufus W. Peckham	Associate Justice	New York	Howell Edmunds Jackson	December 9, 1895 (Acclamation)	January 6, 1896 – October 24, 1909 (Died)
	Joseph McKenna	Associate Justice	California	Stephen Johnson Field	January 21, 1898 (Acclamation)	January 26, 1898 – January 5, 1925 (Retired)
	Oliver Wendell Holmes Jr.	Associate Justice	Massachusetts	Horace Gray	December 4, 1902 (Acclamation)	December 8, 1902 – January 12, 1932 (Retired)
	William R. Day	Associate Justice	Ohio	George Shiras Jr.	February 23, 1903 (Acclamation)	March 2, 1903 – November 13, 1922 (Retired)

== Notable Case in 197 U.S. ==
=== Jacobson v. Massachusetts ===
In Jacobson v. Massachusetts, 197 U.S. 11 (1905), the Supreme Court upheld the authority of states to enforce compulsory vaccination laws. The Court's opinion, cited in many later cases, articulated the view that individual liberty is not absolute, but rather is subject to the police power of the state.

== Citation style ==
Under the Judiciary Act of 1789 the federal court structure at the time comprised District Courts, which had general trial jurisdiction; Circuit Courts, which had mixed trial and appellate (from the US District Courts) jurisdiction; and the United States Supreme Court, which had appellate jurisdiction over the federal District and Circuit courts—and for certain issues over state courts. The Supreme Court also had limited original jurisdiction (i.e., in which cases could be filed directly with the Supreme Court without first having been heard by a lower federal or state court). There were one or more federal District Courts and/or Circuit Courts in each state, territory, or other geographical region.

The Judiciary Act of 1891 created the United States Courts of Appeals and reassigned the jurisdiction of most routine appeals from the district and circuit courts to these appellate courts. The Act created nine new courts that were originally known as the "United States Circuit Courts of Appeals." The new courts had jurisdiction over most appeals of lower court decisions. The Supreme Court could review either legal issues that a court of appeals certified or decisions of court of appeals by writ of certiorari.

Bluebook citation style is used for case names, citations, and jurisdictions.

- "# Cir." = United States Court of Appeals
  - e.g., "3d Cir." = United States Court of Appeals for the Third Circuit
- "C.C.D." = United States Circuit Court for the District of . . .
  - e.g.,"C.C.D.N.J." = United States Circuit Court for the District of New Jersey
- "D." = United States District Court for the District of . . .
  - e.g.,"D. Mass." = United States District Court for the District of Massachusetts
- "E." = Eastern; "M." = Middle; "N." = Northern; "S." = Southern; "W." = Western
  - e.g.,"C.C.S.D.N.Y." = United States Circuit Court for the Southern District of New York
  - e.g.,"M.D. Ala." = United States District Court for the Middle District of Alabama
- "Ct. Cl." = United States Court of Claims
- The abbreviation of a state's name alone indicates the highest appellate court in that state's judiciary at the time.
  - e.g.,"Pa." = Supreme Court of Pennsylvania
  - e.g.,"Me." = Supreme Judicial Court of Maine

== List of cases in volume 197 U.S. ==
Case Name	Page & year	Opinion of the Court	Concurring opinion(s)	Dissenting opinion(s)	Lower Court	Disposition
Northern P. Ry. Co. v. Ely	1 (1905)	Fuller	none	none	8th Cir.	reversed
Northern P. Ry. Co. v. Hasse	9 (1905)	Fuller	none	none	Wash.	reversed
Jacobson v. Massachusetts	11 (1905)	Harlan	none	none	Mass.	affirmed
Utermehle v. Norment	40 (1905)	Peckham	none	none	D.C. Cir.	affirmed
Kehrer v. Stewart	60 (1905)	Brown	none	none	Ga.	affirmed
San Francisco Nat'l Bank v. Dodge	70 (1905)	White	none	Brewer	9th Cir.	reversed
National C.O. Co. v. Texas	115 (1905)	McKenna	none	none	Tex. App.	affirmed
Southern C.O. Co. v. Texas	134 (1905)	McKenna	none	none	Tex. App.	affirmed
United States v. Whitridge	135 (1905)	Holmes	none	none	4th Cir.	reversed
District of Columbia v. Barnes	146 (1905)	Day	none	none	Ct. Cl.	affirmed
McClaine v. Rankin	154 (1905)	Fuller	none	White	9th Cir.	reversed
Dallemagne v. Moisan	169 (1905)	Peckham	none	none	N.D. Cal.	reversed
City of Dawson v. Columbia et al. Co.	178 (1905)	Holmes	none	none	C.C.N.D. Ga.	reversed
Gregg v. Metropolitan T. Co.	183 (1905)	Holmes	none	McKenna	6th Cir.	affirmed
Caro v. Davidson	197 (1905)	Fuller	none	none	Fla.	dismissed
United States v. Stinson	200 (1905)	Brewer	none	none	7th Cir.	affirmed
Clyatt v. United States	207 (1905)	Brewer	Harlan	none	5th Cir.	reversed
United States v. Mills	223 (1905)	Peckham	none	none	Ct. Cl.	affirmed
Bartlett v. United States	230 (1905)	Holmes	none	none	Ct. Cl.	affirmed
Greer Cnty. v. Texas	235 (1905)	Holmes	none	none	Tex. App.	affirmed
Harriman v. Northern Sec. Co.	244 (1905)	Fuller	none	none	3d Cir.	affirmed
Western E.S. Co. v. Abbeville E.L. & P. Co.	299 (1905)	Fuller	none	none	S.C.	dismissed
McMichael v. Murphy	304 (1905)	Harlan	none	none	Sup. Ct. Terr. Okla.	affirmed
Chrisman v. Miller	313 (1905)	Brewer	none	none	Cal.	affirmed
In re Strauss	324 (1905)	Brewer	none	none	2d Cir.	certification
Bishop v. United States	334 (1905)	Brown	none	none	Ct. Cl.	affirmed
McMillen v. Ferrum M. Co.	343 (1905)	Brown	none	none	Colo.	dismissed
Carter v. Gear	348 (1905)	Brown	none	none	Sup. Ct. Terr. Haw.	affirmed
Keppel v. Tiffin S. Bank	356 (1905)	White	none	Day	6th Cir.	certification
United States v. Smith	386 (1905)	White	none	none	Ct. Cl.	reversed
Middletown Nat'l Bank v. Toledo et al. Co.	394 (1905)	Peckham	none	none	2d Cir.	certification
Pennsylvania et al. Co. v. Meyer	407 (1905)	Peckham	none	none	2d Cir.	certification
Lincoln v. United States	419 (1905)	Holmes	none	none	S.D.N.Y.	reversed
Louisville & N.R.R. Co. v. Barber A.P. Co.	430 (1905)	Holmes	none	none	Ky.	affirmed
Stillman v. Combel	436 (1905)	Holmes	none	none	C.C.S.D. Tex.	reversed
Hackfeld & Co. v. United States	442 (1905)	Day	none	none	9th Cir.	reversed
New Orleans G.L. Co. v. Drainage Comm'n	453 (1905)	Day	none	none	La.	affirmed
Iron Cliffs Co. v. Negaunee I. Co.	463 (1905)	Day	none	none	Mich.	dismissed
United States v. Cadarr	475 (1905)	Day	none	none	D.C. Cir.	reversed
In re Massachusetts	482 (1905)	Fuller	none	none	Sup. Ct. D.C.	dismissed
In re Heff	488 (1905)	Brewer	none	none	D. Kan.	habeas corpus granted
Whitaker v. McBride	510 (1905)	Brewer	none	none	Neb.	affirmed
Rassmussen v. United States	516 (1905)	White	Harlan; Brown	none	D. Alaska	reversed
United States v. Lake Shore et al. Ry. Co.	536 (1905)	McKenna	none	none	C.C.N.D. Ohio	affirmed
Muhlker v. New York & H.R.R. Co.	544 (1905)	McKenna	none	Holmes	N.Y. Sup. Ct.	reversed
Missouri v. Nebraska	577 (1905)	per curiam	none	none	original	final decree

== See also ==
- Certificate of division
