= Hotema v. United States =

- Supreme Court of the United States

Decided June 2, 1902
- Full case name: Hotema v. United States
- Citations: 186 U.S. 413 (more)

Holding
- The jury instruction regarding the defendant's potential insanity satisfied the M'Naghten rule.

Court membership
- Chief Justice Melville Fuller Associate Justices John M. Harlan · Horace Gray; David J. Brewer · Henry B. Brown; George Shiras Jr. · Edward D. White; Rufus W. Peckham · Joseph McKenna

Hotema v. United States, 186 U.S. 413 (1902), was a United States Supreme Court case in which the Court held that the jury instruction regarding the defendant's potential insanity plea satisfied the M'Naghten rule.

== Description ==
Hotema was a member of the Choctaw nation who came to believe, after reading the Bible, that witches were real. He killed a woman whom he believed to be a witch, believing it was his sacred duty to do so.

At trial, Hotema's defense counsel argued that this explanation was evidence of an insane delusion. The jury received an instruction about insanity that said that, if Hotema truly believed this and knew that he would be punished for the killing, then it was not an insane delusion, but rather an erroneous conclusion that would not provide Hotema with an excuse from punishment.

The Supreme Court held that the instruction satisfied the M'Naughten rule and was acceptable, but reserved on other questions raised by the case. The Court's acceptance of an instruction that plainly described a religious belief as erroneous clashed with later decisions like United States v. Ballard.

== See also ==
- Reynolds v. United States
