= Caviezel v. Great Neck Public Schools =

- Court: United States Court of Appeals for the Second Circuit
- Decided: 2012
- Citation: 500 Fed. Appx. 16

Case opinions
- Majority: Per curiam

Caviezel v. Great Neck Public Schools, 500 Fed. Appx. 16 (2012), is a decision of the United States Court of Appeals for the Second Circuit upholding the denial of a religious exemption to mandatory vaccination sought by a parent who claimed to adhere to a non-denominational religious view without a formal doctrine.

== Facts ==
In 2007, Martina Caviezel and Andreas Schenck Caviezel sought to avoid the mandatory vaccination of their daughter as a prerequisite for attending kindergarten. When the child's school denied a request for a religious exemption to vaccination, the parents sued, asserting religious rights under New York law and the Constitution of the United States. The parents asserted that they were pantheists, with the mother testifying "I see God in everything. I believe God's present", and that she did not believe that humans needed vaccines due to their divine nature, but also testifying that the church in which she was ordained did not have doctrines. In 2010, district court judge Arthur Spatt ruled that "the Caviezels were not entitled to preliminary injunctive relief because they failed, at a hearing, to demonstrate a likelihood of success on the merits, i.e., that their opposition to vaccination was based on 'genuine and sincere religious beliefs which prohibit vaccinations'". The language of the district court opinion was described as "the strongest on this issue so far" in denying a religious exemption from vaccination.

== Ruling ==
In a 2012 decision, the Second Circuit "upheld [the] decision that parents failed credibly to demonstrate that they held genuine and sincere religious beliefs that prohibited vaccinations for their child, as required to establish religious-based exemption from the state's immunization requirement". The court found that "the Caviezels' substantive due process challenge to New York's immunization requirement is defeated by Jacobson v. Massachusetts", a 1905 United States Supreme Court case rejecting a challenge to a smallpox vaccination mandate. The court also dismissed First Amendment and Equal Protection Clause challenges.

The Caviezel's filed a writ of certiorari requesting that the United States Supreme Court hear the case, which was denied. The case was cited as precedent for other significant decisions in the field, such as the 2015 case of Phillips v. City of New York. The decision of the lower court in this case, having been affirmed, was later cited in a 2021 state effort to bar members of the Catholic Church from receiving exemptions from COVID-19 vaccination, based on statements by church leaders supporting such vaccination.
