= Commonwealth v. Alger =

1851 Massachusetts Supreme Judicial Court case

Commonwealth v. Alger, 61 Mass. 53 (7 Cush. 53), was decided by the Supreme Judicial Court of Massachusetts in 1851. The majority opinion was written by Justice Lemuel Shaw.

== Brief ==
=== Parties ===
The defendant, Alger, was a Boston resident who owned property along the Boston harbor. The Plaintiff is the Commonwealth of Massachusetts.

=== Relevant statutes ===
There are two statutes involved in this case.

1. Colony Ordinance of 1647 which stated that owners of waterfront property also owned the adjoining land above the low water mark and within 100 rods of the land, with power to erect wharves and other buildings thereon; subject to the reasonable use of other individuals and of the public's ability to navigate. Construction was also subject to the restraints and limitations as the legislature may see fit to impose for the preservation and protection of public and private rights. 61 Mass. 53 (1851).
2. Massachusetts legislature enacted a subsequent statute pursuant to the Colony Ordinance of 1647 which established lines in the Boston harbor limiting how far out wharves may extend. The statutes stated that if a wharf extended beyond an established line, then it will be considered a public nuisance. In establishing these lines, the legislature overruled the Colony Ordinance of 1647 which allowed owners of harbor-front land to build a wharf extending 100 rods into the harbor.

=== Facts ===
In this case, Alger (Defendant) built a wharf in the Boston Harbor that extended beyond a line established by the Massachusetts legislature. Alger's wharf was otherwise within the geographical limits of the colony ordinance of 1647 and it did not impede or obstruct the public's navigation.

=== Issue ===
The issue in Commonwealth v. Alger is "What are the just powers of the legislature to limit, control, or regulate the exercises and enjoyment of a property owner's rights." 61 Mass. 53, 65 (1851). In short, when, if ever, can a regulation be a taking? The Massachusetts Supreme Court held the Massachusetts Legislature's statutes creating the lines were constitutional, and the legislature had the authority to make that statute. The statute establishing the line was binding on Alger and he violated the line. Id. at 102.

=== Sources of regulatory power ===
Justice Shaw held it is settled principle that, "every holder of property...holds it under the implied liability that his use of it may be so regulated, that it shall not be injurious to the equal enjoyment of others having an equal right to the enjoyment of their property, not injurious to the rights of the community." Id. at 84.

Police power today is, "generally, but vaguely understood in American jurisprudence to refer to state regulatory power," but really encompasses more. 58 U. Miami L. Rev. 471, 473(2004). In an attempt to define police power, Shaw stated, "the government's power to enact such regulations for the good and welfare of the community as it sees fit, subject to the limitations that the regulation be both reasonable and constitutional." Id. at 479-80. Shaw goes on to explain that, "It is much easier to perceive and realize the existence and sources of this power, then to mark its boundaries, or prescribe limits to its exercise." 61 Mass 53, 85(1851).

=== Eminent domain vs. police power ===
Most notably, the court also attempts to differentiate between eminent domain and police power. In what is often referred to as the most important paragraph of the opinion, the court explains that police power, "is very different from the right of eminent domain, the right of a government to take and appropriate private property to public use, whenever the public exigency requires it; which can be done only on condition of providing a reasonable compensation therefore. The power we allude to is rather the police power, the power vested in the legislature by the constitution, to make, ordain, and establish all manner of wholesome and reasonable laws, statutes and ordinance, either with penalties or without, not repugnant to the constitution, as they shall judge to be for the good and welfare of the commonwealth, and of the subjects of the same." Id.

It is often hard to distinguish between police power and eminent domain. Professor Benjamin Barros states, "Shaw's attempt to make a principled distinction between eminent domain and the police power was understandable. In the 19th century, it was widely accepted that just compensation was required only for physical takings, and regulatory restraints on property were generally considered to be outside of the scope of the Takings clause. Categorizing the law that prohibited Alger from building his wharf as a regulation allowed Shaw to deny Alger's claim for compensation. By using the new term 'police power,' Shaw tried to explain this rule in terms of two distinct government powers, each serving a different purpose." 58 U. Miami L. Rev. 471, 480-81(2004). Shaw provides obvious uses of police power, such as prohibiting the use of warehouses for the storage of gunpowder when the warehouses are located near homes or highways, placing restraints on the height of wooden buildings in crowded areas and requiring them to be covered with incombustible material, and prohibiting buildings from being used as hospitals for contagious diseases or carrying on of noxious or offensive trades. 61 Mass. 53, 85-86(1851).

Justice Shaw reasoned the Massachusetts statute was, "not an appropriation of the property to a public use, but the restraint of an injurious private use by the owner, and is therefore not within the principle of property taken under the right of eminent domain." Id. at 86. Shaw also thought the court's holding in this case would promote certainty, "Things done may or may not be wrong in themselves, or necessarily injurious and punishable as such at common law; but laws are passed declaring them offenses, and making them punishable, because they tend to injurious consequences; but more especially for the sake of having a definite, known and authoritative rule which all can understand and obey." 58 U. Miami L. Rev. 471, 481 (2004). Shaw gave an example of the certainty outcome he expected to obtain with this holding: "The trademan needs to know, before incurring expenses, how near he may build his works without violating the law or committing a nuisance; builders of houses to know, to what distance they must keep from the obnoxious works already erected, in order to be sure of the protection of the law for their habitations. This requisite certainty and precision can only be obtained by a positive enactment...enforcing the rule thus fixed, by penalties." 61 Mass. 53, 96-97 (1851). Applying this reasoning to the facts in Alger, Professor Barros concluded that, "the law challenged in Alger thus legitimately established a point beyond which wharves could not be built, and Alger's wharf was subject to such regulation even though it was not intrinsically harmful." 58 U. Miami L. Rev. 471, 482 (2004).

=== Compensation ===
Justice Shaw states that even though these prohibitions and restraints resulting from the Massachusetts statute may diminish the profits of the owner, the owners are not entitled to compensation because they are exercises of police power. (61 Mass. 53, 86). Justice Shaw's statement regarding compensation was generally accepted doctrine at the time, namely that the obligation to compensate was limited to exercises of eminent domain. 58 U. Miami L. Rev 471, 480(2004). However, passage of time "would show this rule to be flawed." Id. at 481.

== Impact ==
Commonwealth v. Alger helped signify a shift from community-based common-law regulation toward the modern regulatory state. Id. at 471 (2004). The case helped define what we now think of as the broad scope of policing regulations. The decision in Commonwealth v. Alger also breaks "with a laissez-faire tradition and ushers in an era of positivist regulation." Id. at 482. Finally, the court's decision in Commonwealth v. Alger demonstrated an expanded interpretation of the new term "police power" with Shaw holding, "that state authority to enact police regulations includes, but is not limited to, such doctrines as "use your own as not to injure another's property," and that the legislature has broad authority to exercise this power." Id.

=== Post Alger adjudications ===
- Mugler v. Kansas, 123 U.S. 623 (1887): Justice Harlan, delivering the opinion of the U.S. Supreme Court held, "If something was so harmful as to justify regulation under the police power, it could be regulated without compensation, regardless of the effect of the regulation on value." Id. at 504. This was consistent with Justice Shaw's holdings in Alger of "police power" as a very broad, sweeping concept and his recognition that compensation was not due when the government was exercising their police power as opposed to declaring a government action eminent domain.
- Pennsylvania Coal Co v. Mahon, 43 Sup Ct 158 (1922): Justice Holmes, delivering the opinion of the U.S. Supreme Court effectively overrules the holding in Commonwealth v. Alger and Mugler v. Kansas, stating that an exercise of police power which, as the court decided that it did on the facts of this case, prohibited all economic use of a piece of land owned by the plaintiff was a taking and compensation was due. This decision helped explain the concept of a "regulatory taking".
