= Damnum absque injuria =

Principle of tort law

In law, damnum absque injuria (Latin for "loss or damage without injury") is the principle of tort law in which some person (natural or legal) causes damage or loss to another, but does not injure them. For example, opening a burger stand near someone else's may cause them to lose customers, but this in itself does not give rise to a cause of action for the original burger stand owner.

== Categories of damnum absque injuria ==
Edward Weeks identified three categories of damnum absque injuria: the absence of legal protection for some interests, the general limits to legal protection of interests, and the varying extent of legal protections of interests.

=== Absence of legal protection for some interests ===
Weeks and Oliver Wendell Holmes Jr. identified several interests that lacked legal protection altogether. At the time of Weeks' treatise, there was no legal protection for emotional distress unconnected to a physical injury. Holmes also cited the example of an easement for light and air—if a neighbor built up a tall structure that overshadowed your house, you would have no legal remedy.

=== General limits to legal protection of interests ===
Weeks and Holmes also identified that there could be damage without legal remedy based on some doctrines that limited liability. Contributory negligence, for example, could deprive a plaintiff of a legal remedy against a negligent defendant.

=== Varying extent of legal protections of interests ===
Weeks and Holmes also recognized that there could be damage without legal remedy if the damage occurred outside the scope of protection for legally recognized interests. Riparian owners, for example, could suffer damage from their neighbors upstream use of the water, but as long as the use was considered reasonable there would be no legal remedy.

== Reference case ==
In John Rylands and Jehu Horrocks v Thomas Fletcher (1868) House of Lords L.R. 3 H.L. 330, the judgment of Lord Cairns and Lord Cranworth stated:

Where the owner of land, without wilfulness or negligence, uses his land in the ordinary manner of its use, though mischief should thereby be occasioned to his neighbour, he will not be liable in damages.

In the 1938 decision in Alabama Power Co. v. Ickes (302 U.S. 464), the U.S. Supreme Court ruled:

The term "direct injury" is there used in its legal sense, as meaning a wrong which directly results in the violation of a legal right. "An injury, legally speaking, consists of a wrong done to a person, or, in other words, a violation of his right. It is an ancient maxim, that a damage to one, without an injury in this sense (damnum absque injuria), does not lay the foundation of an action; because, if the act complained of does not violate any of his legal rights, it is obvious, that he has no cause to complain. ... Want of right and want of remedy are justly said to be reciprocal. Where therefore there has been a violation of a right, the person injured is entitled to an action." Parker v. Griswold, 17 Conn. 288, 302, 303, 42 Am.Dec. 739. The converse is equally true, that where, although there is damage, there is no violation of a right no action can be maintained.
