= List of United States Supreme Court cases, volume 186 =

Supreme Court of the United States
- Interactive map of Supreme Court of the United States
- 38°53′26″N 77°00′16″W
- Established: March 4, 1789; 236 years ago
- Location: Washington, D.C.
- Coordinates: 38°53′26″N 77°00′16″W
- Composition method: Presidential nomination with Senate confirmation
- Authorised by: Constitution of the United States, Art. III, § 1
- Judge term length: life tenure, subject to impeachment and removal
- Number of positions: 9 (by statute)
- Website: supremecourt.gov

This is a list of cases reported in volume 186 of United States Reports, decided by the Supreme Court of the United States in 1902.

== Justices of the Supreme Court at the time of volume 186 U.S. ==
The Supreme Court is established by Article III, Section 1 of the Constitution of the United States, which says: "The judicial Power of the United States, shall be vested in one supreme Court . . .". The size of the Court is not specified; the Constitution leaves it to Congress to set the number of justices. Under the Judiciary Act of 1789 Congress originally fixed the number of justices at six (one chief justice and five associate justices). Since 1789 Congress has varied the size of the Court from six to seven, nine, ten, and back to nine justices (always including one chief justice).

When the cases in volume 186 were decided the Court comprised the following nine members:

| Portrait | Justice | Office | Home State | Succeeded | Date confirmed by the Senate (Vote) | Tenure on Supreme Court |
|---|---|---|---|---|---|---|
| | Melville Fuller | Chief Justice | Illinois | Morrison Waite | July 20, 1888 (41–20) | October 8, 1888 – July 4, 1910 (Died) |
| | John Marshall Harlan | Associate Justice | Kentucky | David Davis | November 29, 1877 (Acclamation) | December 10, 1877 – October 14, 1911 (Died) |
| | Horace Gray | Associate Justice | Massachusetts | Nathan Clifford | December 20, 1881 (51–5) | January 9, 1882 – September 15, 1902 (Died) |
| | David Josiah Brewer | Associate Justice | Kansas | Stanley Matthews | December 18, 1889 (53–11) | January 6, 1890 – March 28, 1910 (Died) |
| | Henry Billings Brown | Associate Justice | Michigan | Samuel Freeman Miller | December 29, 1890 (Acclamation) | January 5, 1891 – May 28, 1906 (Retired) |
| | George Shiras Jr. | Associate Justice | Pennsylvania | Joseph P. Bradley | July 26, 1892 (Acclamation) | October 10, 1892 – February 23, 1903 (Retired) |
| | Edward Douglass White | Associate Justice | Louisiana | Samuel Blatchford | February 19, 1894 (Acclamation) | March 12, 1894 – December 18, 1910 (Continued as chief justice) |
| | Rufus W. Peckham | Associate Justice | New York | Howell Edmunds Jackson | December 9, 1895 (Acclamation) | January 6, 1896 – October 24, 1909 (Died) |
| | Joseph McKenna | Associate Justice | California | Stephen Johnson Field | January 21, 1898 (Acclamation) | January 26, 1898 – January 5, 1925 (Retired) |

== Citation style ==
Under the Judiciary Act of 1789 the federal court structure at the time comprised District Courts, which had general trial jurisdiction; Circuit Courts, which had mixed trial and appellate (from the US District Courts) jurisdiction; and the United States Supreme Court, which had appellate jurisdiction over the federal District and Circuit courts—and for certain issues over state courts. The Supreme Court also had limited original jurisdiction (i.e., in which cases could be filed directly with the Supreme Court without first having been heard by a lower federal or state court). There were one or more federal District Courts and/or Circuit Courts in each state, territory, or other geographical region.

The Judiciary Act of 1891 created the United States Courts of Appeals and reassigned the jurisdiction of most routine appeals from the district and circuit courts to these appellate courts. The Act created nine new courts that were originally known as the "United States Circuit Courts of Appeals." The new courts had jurisdiction over most appeals of lower court decisions. The Supreme Court could review either legal issues that a court of appeals certified or decisions of court of appeals by writ of certiorari.

Bluebook citation style is used for case names, citations, and jurisdictions.

- "# Cir." = United States Court of Appeals
  - e.g., "3d Cir." = United States Court of Appeals for the Third Circuit
- "C.C.D." = United States Circuit Court for the District of . . .
  - e.g.,"C.C.D.N.J." = United States Circuit Court for the District of New Jersey
- "D." = United States District Court for the District of . . .
  - e.g.,"D. Mass." = United States District Court for the District of Massachusetts
- "E." = Eastern; "M." = Middle; "N." = Northern; "S." = Southern; "W." = Western
  - e.g.,"C.C.S.D.N.Y." = United States Circuit Court for the Southern District of New York
  - e.g.,"M.D. Ala." = United States District Court for the Middle District of Alabama
- "Ct. Cl." = United States Court of Claims
- The abbreviation of a state's name alone indicates the highest appellate court in that state's judiciary at the time.
  - e.g.,"Pa." = Supreme Court of Pennsylvania
  - e.g.,"Me." = Supreme Judicial Court of Maine

== List of cases in volume 186 U.S. ==
| Case Name | Page & year | Opinion of the Court | Concurring opinion(s) | Dissenting opinion(s) | Lower Court | Disposition |
|---|---|---|---|---|---|---|
| The S.S. Styria | 1 (1902) | Shiras | none | none | 2d Cir. | reversed |
| Montana M. Co. v. St. Louis et al. Co. | 24 (1902) | Fuller | none | none | 9th Cir. | dismissed |
| Emsheimer v. City of New Orleans | 33 (1902) | Fuller | none | none | 5th Cir. | certification |
| McClaughry v. Deming | 49 (1902) | Peckham | none | none | C.C.D. Kan. | affirmed |
| Bement & Sons v. National H. Co. | 70 (1902) | Peckham | none | none | N.Y. Sup. Ct. | affirmed |
| Murphy v. Utter | 95 (1902) | Brown | none | none | Sup. Ct. Terr. Ariz. | affirmed |
| Beyer v. LeFevre | 114 (1902) | Brewer | none | none | D.C. Cir. | reversed |
| Felsenheld v. United States | 126 (1902) | Brewer | none | none | 4th Cir. | certification |
| Bowker v. United States | 135 (1902) | Fuller | none | none | D.N.J. | dismissed |
| Ward v. Joslin | 142 (1902) | Fuller | none | none | 1st Cir. | affirmed |
| Nesbitt v. United States | 153 (1902) | McKenna | none | none | Ct. Cl. | affirmed |
| Williams v. Gaylord | 157 (1902) | McKenna | none | none | 9th Cir. | affirmed |
| Lee Lung v. Patterson | 168 (1902) | McKenna | none | none | D. Or. | affirmed |
| Gallaway v. Fort W. Bank | 177 (1902) | Fuller | none | none | not indicated | bond waiver denied |
| Hatfield v. King | 178 (1902) | Fuller | none | none | C.C.D.W. Va. | revision denied |
| Hanover Nat'l Bank v. Moyses | 181 (1902) | Fuller | none | none | C.C.E.D. Tenn. | affirmed |
| Chin Bak Kan v. United States | 193 (1902) | Fuller | none | none | N.D.N.Y. | affirmed |
| Denver 1st Nat'l Bank v. Klug | 202 (1902) | Fuller | none | none | D. Colo. | dismissed |
| Clark v. Herington | 206 (1902) | Brewer | none | none | Kan. | affirmed |
| Bienville W.S. Co. v. City of Mobile | 212 (1902) | Brewer | none | none | C.C.S.D. Ala. | affirmed |
| Hardy v. United States | 224 (1902) | Brewer | none | none | D. Alaska | affirmed |
| Jenkins v. Neff | 230 (1902) | Brewer | none | none | N.Y. Sup. Ct. | affirmed |
| Chesapeake et al. Co. v. Manning | 238 (1902) | Brewer | none | White | D.C. Cir. | reversed |
| Minneapolis et al. R.R. Co. v. Minnesota R.R.W.C. | 257 (1902) | Brown | none | none | Minn. | affirmed |
| New York et al. R.R. Co. v. City of New York | 269 (1902) | Brown | none | none | N.Y. Sup. Ct. | dismissed |
| Hoffeld v. United States | 273 (1902) | Brown | none | none | Ct. Cl. | affirmed |
| Pine R.L. Co. v. United States | 279 (1902) | Brown | none | none | 8th Cir. | affirmed |
| United States v. A. Nicholls Co. | 298 (1902) | Brown | none | none | 2d Cir. | certification |
| Kennard v. Nebraska | 304 (1902) | Shiras | none | none | Neb. | dismissed |
| United States v. Freel | 309 (1902) | Shiras | none | none | 2d Cir. | affirmed |
| ICC v. Chicago et al. R.R. Co. | 320 (1902) | White | none | none | 7th Cir. | affirmed |
| Fidelity & D. Co. v. Courtney | 342 (1902) | White | none | none | 6th Cir. | affirmed |
| Warner v. Godfrey | 365 (1902) | White | none | none | D.C. Cir. | reversed |
| Compagnie Francaise v. Louisiana Bd. of H. | 380 (1902) | White | none | Brown | La. | affirmed |
| Capital City L.F. Co. v. City of Tallahassee | 401 (1902) | Peckham | none | none | Fla. | affirmed |
| Hotema v. United States | 413 (1902) | Peckham | none | none | E.D. Tex. | affirmed |
| Hagan v. Scottish U.N. Ins. Co. | 423 (1902) | Peckham | none | none | 3d Cir. | reversed |
| Farmers' L. & T. Co. v. Pennsylvania P.G. Co. | 434 (1902) | Peckham | none | none | 3d Cir. | affirmed |
| Lander v. Mercantile Nat'l Bank | 458 (1902) | McKenna | none | none | 6th Cir. | reversed |

== See also ==
- Certificate of division
