= Prince v. Massachusetts =

- Supreme Court of the United States

Argued December 14, 1943 Decided January 31, 1944
- Full case name: Sarah Prince v. Commonwealth of Massachusetts
- Citations: 321 U.S. 158 (more) 64 S. Ct. 438; 88 L. Ed. 645; 1944 U.S. LEXIS 1328

Court membership
- Chief Justice Harlan F. Stone Associate Justices Owen Roberts · Hugo Black; Stanley F. Reed · Felix Frankfurter; William O. Douglas · Frank Murphy; Robert H. Jackson · Wiley B. Rutledge

Case opinions
- Majority: Rutledge, joined by Stone, Black, Reed, Douglas
- Dissent: Murphy
- Dissent: Jackson, joined by Roberts, Frankfurter

Prince v. Massachusetts, 321 U.S. 158 (1944), was a United States Supreme Court case which held that the government has broad authority to regulate the actions and treatment of children. Parental authority is not absolute and can be permissibly restricted if doing so is in the interests of a child's welfare. While children share many of the rights of adults, they face different potential harms from similar activities.

== Background ==
A Jehovah's Witness woman named Sarah Prince was convicted of violating child labor laws. She was the guardian of a nine-year-old girl, Betty M. Simmons, whom she had brought into a downtown area to preach on the streets. The preaching involved distributing literature in exchange for voluntary contributions. The child labor laws that she was charged with violating stipulated that no boys under 12 and no girls under 18 were permitted to sell literature or other goods on public thoroughfares.

There were three complaints filed against Prince:

1. Refusal to disclose her child's identity and age to a public officer whose duty was to enforce the statutes;
2. Furnishing the girl with magazines, knowing she was to sell them unlawfully, that is, on the street; and
3. As child's custodian, permitting her to work contrary to law.

Both Prince and her husband were ordained ministers and commonly took their children out to distribute religious literature. Prince argued that the state's child labor laws violated her First Amendment rights to exercise her religion and her equal protection rights under the Fourteenth Amendment, particularly because the children themselves were ministers of their religion as well.

== Decision ==
In a 5–4 decision, with Justice Rutledge writing the majority opinion, the Supreme Court upheld the Massachusetts laws restricting the right of children to sell religious literature. The decision asserted that the government has broad authority to regulate the actions and treatment of children. Parental authority is not absolute and can be permissibly restricted if doing so is in the interests of a child's welfare. While children share many of the rights of adults, they face different potential harms from similar activities.

One issue that the Court considered was whether a parent's presence makes it permissible for the child to engage in actions that would otherwise be prohibited. Noting that the dangers would still exist, the Court decided that the state was free to legislate against this activity, even if adults were allowed to engage in them. The opinion noted:

The family itself is not beyond regulation in the public interest, as against a claim of religious liberty. And neither the rights of religion nor the rights of parenthood are beyond limitation…. The right to practice religion freely does not include the right to expose the community or the child to communicable disease or the latter to ill-health or death....

Parents may be free to become martyrs themselves. But it does not follow they are free, in identical circumstances, to make martyrs of their children before they have reached the age of full and legal discretion when they can make that choice for themselves. Massachusetts has determined that an absolute prohibition, though one limited to streets and public places and to the incidental uses proscribed, is necessary to accomplish its legitimate objectives. Its power to attain them is broad enough to reach these peripheral instances in which the parent's supervision may reduce but cannot eliminate entirely the ill effects of the prohibited conduct. We think that with reference to the public proclaiming of religion, upon the streets and in other similar public places, the power of the state to control the conduct of children reaches beyond the scope of its authority over adults, as is true in the case of other freedoms, and the rightful boundary of its power has not been crossed in this case.

Although the dispute did not involve a vaccination mandate, the Court, citing the 1905 case Jacobson v. Massachusetts, described vaccination as an example of a fundamental police power justifying the outcome in Prince. For this reason, Prince has at times also been cited by courts upholding the constitutionality of vaccination mandates.

=== Dissenting opinions ===
Justice Frank Murphy dissented: "Religious freedom is too sacred a right to be restricted or prohibited in any degree without convincing proof that a legitimate interest of the state is in grave danger."

Justice Robert H. Jackson, joined by Justices Owen Roberts and Felix Frankfurter, also dissented. They agreed with the judgment of the Massachusetts Supreme Judicial Court.

== See also ==
- Children's rights
- Jacobson v. Massachusetts
