= Jacobson v. Massachusetts =

- Supreme Court of the United States

Argued December 6, 1904 Decided February 20, 1905
- Full case name: Henning Jacobson, plaintiff in error v. Commonwealth of Massachusetts
- Citations: 197 U.S. 11 (more) 25 S. Ct. 358, 49 L. Ed. 643, 1905 U.S. LEXIS 1232

Case history
- Prior: Defendant convicted, Third District Court of Eastern Middlesex (1902); judgment affirmed, Commonwealth v. Henning Jacobson, 183 Mass 242 (1903)

Holding
- The police power of a state must be held to embrace at least such reasonable regulations established directly by legislative enactment to protect public health and safety.

Court membership
- Chief Justice Melville Fuller Associate Justices John M. Harlan · David J. Brewer; Henry B. Brown · Edward D. White; Rufus W. Peckham · Joseph McKenna; Oliver W. Holmes Jr. · William R. Day

Case opinions
- Majority: Harlan, joined by Fuller, Brown, White, McKenna, Holmes, Day
- Dissent: Brewer
- Dissent: Peckham

Jacobson v. Massachusetts, 197 U.S. 11 (1905), was a United States Supreme Court case in which the court upheld the authority of states to enforce compulsory vaccination laws. The court stated that individual liberty was not absolute and was subject to the police power of the state. The case has been invoked in numerous other Supreme Court cases as an example of baseline exercise of the police power.

== Background ==
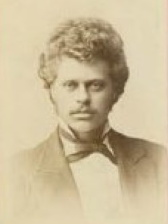
Henning Jacobson, 1878

Massachusetts was one of eleven states with compulsory vaccination laws, and empowered the boards of health of individual municipalities to enforce mandatory, free vaccinations for adults over the age of 21 if the municipality determined that it was necessary for public health or safety of the community. Adults who refused were subject to a $5 fine (equivalent to $186 in 2025). In 1902, faced with an outbreak of smallpox, the Board of Health of Cambridge, Massachusetts adopted a regulation ordering the vaccination or revaccination of all its inhabitants.

Cambridge pastor Henning Jacobson had lived through an era of mandatory vaccinations back in his original home of Sweden. Although the efforts to eradicate smallpox had been successful in Sweden, his own childhood vaccination had gone badly, leaving him with a "lifelong horror of the practice". He refused vaccination, stating that "he and his son had had bad reactions to earlier vaccinations" as children and that Jacobson himself "had been caused great and extreme suffering for a long period by a disease produced by vaccination." He believed that his family may have had some sort of hereditary condition that made the smallpox vaccine particularly dangerous. Because of his refusal to get vaccinated, he was prosecuted and fined $5. While fighting the fine over the next three years, he argued that being subjected to a fine for refusing vaccination was an invasion of his liberty, the law was "unreasonable, arbitrary and oppressive", and that one should not be subjected to the law if they objected to vaccination for any reason.

== Decision ==
Justice John Marshall Harlan wrote for a seven-justice majority, joined by Chief Justice Melville Fuller and Justices Henry Billings Brown, Edward Douglass White, Joseph McKenna, Oliver Wendell Holmes Jr., and William R. Day. Harlan held that the Massachusetts law did not violate the Fourteenth Amendment, stating that:

in every well ordered society charged with the duty of conserving the safety of its members the rights of the individual in respect of his liberty may at times, under the pressure of great dangers, be subjected to such restraint, to be enforced by reasonable regulations, as the safety of the general public may demand. ... Real liberty for all could not exist under the operation of a principle which recognizes the right of each individual person to use his own [liberty], whether in respect of his person or his property, regardless of the injury that may be done to others.

Harlan wrote that mandatory vaccinations were neither arbitrary nor oppressive so long as they did not "go so far beyond what was reasonably required for the safety of the public". In Massachusetts, with smallpox being "prevalent and increasing at Cambridge," he therefore argued that the regulation in question was "necessary in order to protect the public health and secure the public safety." He noted that Jacobson had shown that many in the medical community believed that the smallpox vaccine would not stop the spread of the disease and could in fact cause other diseases, but stated that the opinions offered were "more formidable by their number than by their inherent value" and "[w]hat everybody knows, ... [the] opposite theory accords with the common belief and is maintained by high medical authority." Harlan therefore argued that it should be left to the legislature rather than the courts to determine which of the "two modes was likely to be the most effective for the protection of the public against disease." He stated that no one could "confidently assert that the means prescribed by the State to that end has no real or substantial relation to the protection of the public health and the public safety."

Harlan acknowledged that, in "extreme cases", for certain individuals "in a particular condition of ... health", the requirement of vaccination would be "cruel and inhuman", in which case he stated that courts would be empowered to interfere in order to "prevent wrong and oppression." However, he stated that there was no indication that the statute in question was not "intended to be applied to such a case" and that in any event Jacobson had not offered "to prove that, by reason of his then condition, he was, in fact, not a fit subject of vaccination".

=== Dissents ===
Justices David J. Brewer and Rufus W. Peckham dissented, though neither published an opinion.

== Subsequent developments and legacy ==
The court's holding supported both police power and limits on that power, and Harlan's opinion would be invoked to support both in later cases. He stated with respect to the limits of government power that "general terms should be so limited in their application as not to lead to injustice, oppression or absurd consequence."

The anti-vaccine movement mobilized following the decision, and the Anti-Vaccination League of America was founded three years later to promote vaccine hesitancy via the principle that "health is nature's greatest safeguard against disease and that therefore no State has the right to demand of anyone the impairment of his or her health". The League warned about what it believed to be the dangers of vaccination and the dangers of allowing the intrusion of government and science into private life, part of a broader process that American public health researcher James Keith Colgrove identified as related to the Progressive Movement.

The Supreme Court reaffirmed its Jacobson holding in Zucht v. King (1922), which held that a school system could refuse admission to a student who failed to receive a required vaccination. Jacobson has been invoked in numerous other Supreme Court cases as an example of a baseline exercise of the police power, with cases relying on it including Buck v. Bell (1927) (sterilization of those with intellectual disabilities), Prince v. Massachusetts (1944) (limitations on parents having children distribute pamphlets in the street), Cruzan v. Director, Missouri Department of Health (1990) (allowing a state to require "clear and convincing evidence" of a patient's wishes for removal of life support), Vernonia School District 47J v. Acton (1995) (allowing random drug testing of students), and Gonzales v. Carhart (2007) (upholding a federal "partial birth abortion" ban).

The global eradication of smallpox, brought about by an international vaccination campaign, was certified in 1980.

During the COVID-19 pandemic, the United States Court of Appeals for the Fifth Circuit relied on Jacobson to uphold a Texas regulation halting abortions by including it in the state's ban on nonessential medical services and surgeries. Jacobson was also a precedent case in justifying government face mask orders and stay-at-home orders throughout the COVID-19 pandemic.

The closest COVID-19–related lawsuit to a direct challenge to Jacobson was Does v. Mills (2021), which challenged Maine's vaccine mandate for health care workers. By a 6–3 vote, the Supreme Court denied relief to those seeking an injunction against the mandate.

== See also ==
- Compagnie Francaise de Navigation a Vapeur v. Louisiana Board of Health (1902), upholding quarantine laws as a reasonable exercise of police power
- Zucht v. King (1922), holding that public schools could constitutionally exclude unvaccinated students
- National Federation of Independent Business v. Occupational Safety and Health Administration (2022), holding that the Occupational Safety and Health Act does not allow the Occupational Safety and Health Administration to mandate the COVID-19 vaccines
- Vaccination policy

== Sources ==
- George J. Annas, "Blinded by Bioterrorism: Public Health and Liberty in the 21st Century", Health Matrix (2003)
- James Colgrove and Ronald Bayer, "Manifold Restraints: Liberty, Public Health, and the Legacy of Jacobson v Massachusetts", American Journal of Public Health, vol. 95, no. 4 (2005), 571–576
- Lawrence O. Gostin, "Jacobson v. Massachusetts at 100 Years: Police Power and Civil Liberties in Tension", American Journal of Public Health, vol. 95, no. 4 (2005), 576–581
- Wendy K. Mariner et al., "Jacobson v. Massachusetts: It's Not Your Great-Great-Grandfather's Public Health Law", American Journal of Public Health, vol. 95, no. 4 (2005)
- Michael Willrich, Pox: An American History (Penguin, 2011)
