= Police power (United States constitutional law) =

Capacity of the states to regulate behavior and enforce order

In United States constitutional law, the police power is the authority of the U.S. states to pass laws regulating behavior and enforcing order within their territory for the betterment of the health, safety, morals, and general welfare of their inhabitants. Police power is defined in each jurisdiction by the legislative body, which determines the public purposes that need to be served by legislation. Under the Tenth Amendment to the United States Constitution, the powers not delegated to the federal government are reserved to the states or to the people. As a result, the police power primarily belongs to state governments, although the U.S. federal government possesses it in limited contexts where it has an express power, such as over conduct occurring within the territories of the United States and activities related to interstate commerce.

Police power is exercised by the legislative and executive branches of the various states through the enactment and enforcement of laws and regulations. States have the power to compel obedience to these laws through whatever measures they see fit, provided these measures do not infringe upon any of the rights protected by the United States Constitution or their own state constitutions and are not unreasonably arbitrary or oppressive. Methods of enforcement can include legal sanctions and physical means. Controversies over the exercise of state police power can arise when exercise by state authorities conflicts with individual rights and freedoms.

Most criminal cases are prosecuted in the name of the governmental authority that promulgates criminal statutes and enforces the police power of the state with the goal of seeking criminal sanctions.

== Origins ==
The authority for use of police power under American Constitutional law has its roots in English and European common law traditions. Even more fundamentally, use of police power draws on two Latin principles, sic utere tuo ut alienum non laedas ("use that which is yours so as not to injure others"), and salus populi suprema lex esto ("the welfare of the people shall be the supreme law"), to justify restriction of individual liberties in order to protect the general welfare. The concept of police power in America was further expanded in a series of notable court cases in the late-nineteenth and early-twentieth centuries, including the landmark 1851 Massachusetts Supreme Judicial Court case Commonwealth v. Alger, and the 1905 Supreme Court case Jacobson v. Massachusetts.

== Massachusetts law ==
Due to the nebulous definition of the police power, restrictions on its use are few and far between. In Commonwealth v. Alger, Chief Justice Lemuel Shaw wrote that "It is much easier to perceive and realize the existence and sources of [the police power] than to mark its boundaries, or prescribe limits to exercise." However, according to historian Michael Willrich, "Shaw recognized certain constitutional restraints on police power, but they were few. Laws must apply equally to all under like circumstances... government interferences with individual rights must be 'reasonable' – they must have a clear relation to some legitimate legislative purpose. Beyond those outer limits... most courts stayed out of the way of state police power." Later court cases have expanded somewhat on these restrictions by limiting the ability of states to infringe upon implied constitutional rights and by demanding a stricter standard of reasonability, but regulation of police power remains fairly minimal.

== Supreme Court rulings ==
Federal police power has been defined by Supreme Court rulings. In affirming that Congress has limited power to enact legislation, the court ruled in United States v. Lopez (1995) that "The Constitution...withhold[s] from Congress a plenary police power that would authorize enactment of every type of legislation." In United States v. Morrison (2000), the court invalidated a provision of a federal law on violent crime. The court stated, "The regulation and punishment of intrastate violence that is not directed at the instrumentalities, channels, or goods involved in interstate commerce has always been the province of the States...[W]e can think of no better example of the police power, which the Founders denied the National Government and reposed in the States, than the suppression of violent crime..."

== Basis of United States land-use planning authority ==
The police power is the basis for land-use planning authority in the United States. This authority is usually delegated by state governments to local governments, including counties and municipalities, which most frequently exercise police power in land-use planning matters. Such regulation based on police power is distinct from the government's taking of private property through the power of eminent domain—under the authority of the police power, a private property owner is not typically entitled to compensation. The decision by the Massachusetts Supreme Judicial Court in the case Commonwealth v. Alger (1851) was related to land-use planning and dealt with the construction of a wharf on privately owned tidelands around Boston Harbor.

== See also ==
- United States Constitution
- Eminent domain
- Jacobson v. Massachusetts
- Commonwealth v. Alger
- Peace, order, and good government
- Administrative police (France)
