= Laurence Tribe =

American lawyer and Harvard Law School professor (born 1941)

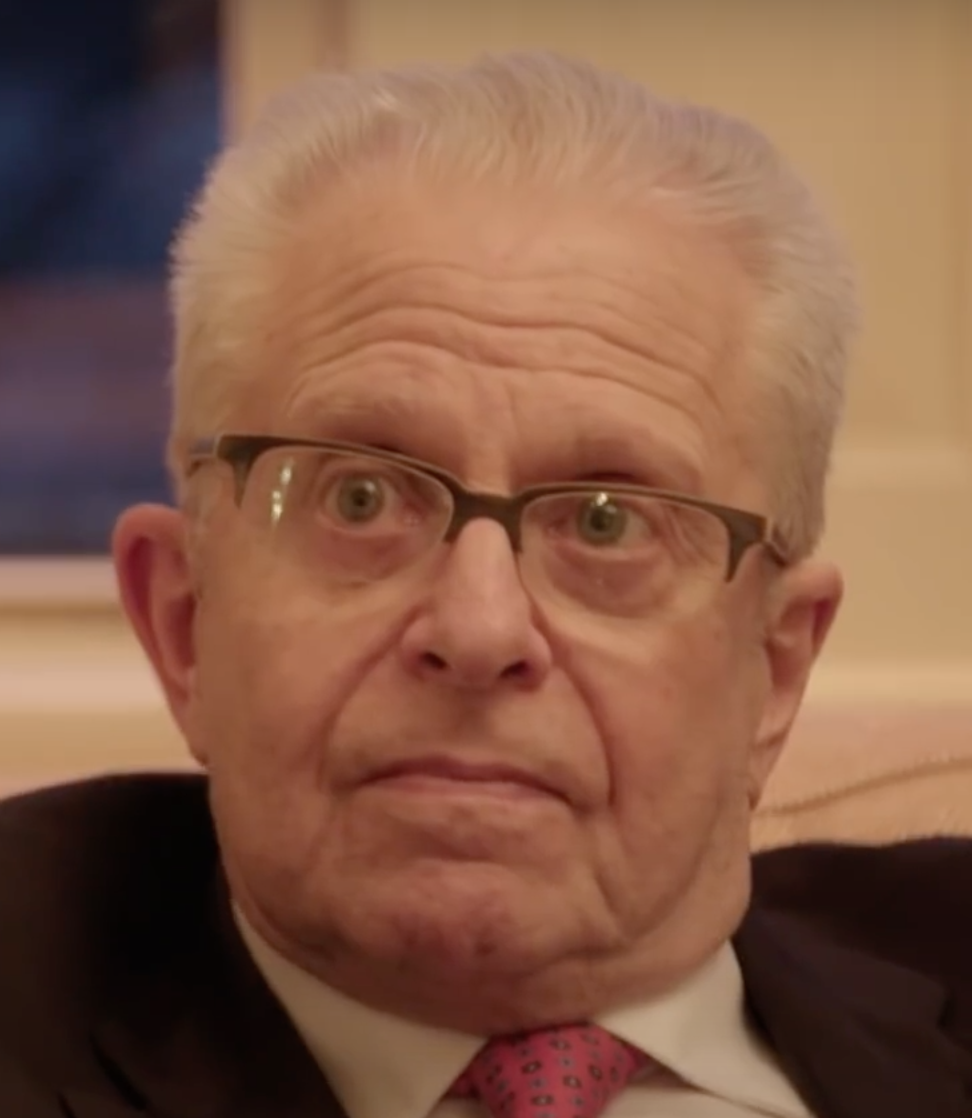
- Tribe in 2019
- Born: Laurence Henry Tribe; October 10, 1941 (age 84); Shanghai, China
- Political party: Democratic
- Awards: American Philosophical Society’s Henry M. Phillips Prize in Jurisprudence (2013); Henry Allen Moe Prize in the Humanities

Academic background
- Education: Harvard University (AB, JD)
- Influences: Tobriner; Stewart; Ely

Academic work
- Discipline: Constitutional law
- Notable students: Barack Obama; Ted Cruz; John Roberts; Elena Kagan; Merrick Garland; Kathleen Sullivan; Jamie Raskin; Adam Schiff; Kenneth Chesebro

Laurence Henry Tribe (born October 10, 1941) is an American legal scholar known for his studies of United States constitutional law. Tribe was a professor at Harvard Law School from 1968 until his retirement in 2020. He currently holds the position of Carl M. Loeb University Professor Emeritus.

A constitutional law scholar, Tribe is co-founder of the American Constitution Society. He is also the author of American Constitutional Law (1978), a major treatise in that field, and has argued before the United States Supreme Court 36 times.

== Personal life and education ==
Tribe was born in 1941 in Shanghai, which was part of the Republic of China. In August 1937, the Empire of Japan conducted a full-scale aerial and naval invasion of the city, the Battle of Shanghai, followed by occupation. Tribe is the son of Paulina (née Diatlovitsky) and George Israel Tribe (original spelling Tribuch). His family is Jewish. His father was born in a town on the of outskirts of Minsk and his mother was born in Harbin to immigrants from Eastern Europe; Tribe's first language was Russian. Tribe spent his early years in the French Concession of Shanghai before his family immigrated to the United States when he was six years old. His family settled in San Francisco, and he attended Abraham Lincoln High School.

After graduating from high school in 1958 at age 16, Tribe attended Harvard University, where he majored in mathematics and was a member of the Harvard Debate Team that won the intercollegiate National Debate Tournament in 1961. He graduated from Harvard in 1962 with a Bachelor of Arts in mathematics. Tribe received a National Science Foundation fellowship to pursue doctoral studies in mathematics at Harvard, but dropped out after one year. He instead decided to attend Harvard Law School, where he was a member of the Harvard Legal Aid Bureau. He graduated from Harvard Law in 1966 with a Juris Doctor magna cum laude.

Tribe married Carolyn Ricarda Kreye in 1964. They divorced in 2008. Their two children, Mark and Kerry, are visual artists.

== Career ==
After graduating from law school, Tribe clerked for justice Mathew Tobriner of the Supreme Court of California from 1966 to 1967, then for Justice Potter Stewart of the U.S. Supreme Court from 1967 to 1968. He then joined the Harvard Law School faculty as an assistant professor, receiving tenure in 1972. Among his law students and research assistants while on the faculty at Harvard have been former President Barack Obama (a research assistant for over two years), Chief Justice John Roberts, US Senator Ted Cruz, former D.C. Circuit Chief Judge and Attorney General Merrick Garland, and Associate Justice Elena Kagan. Other students of Tribe include U.S. Senator Adam Schiff, Former Chair of the House Intelligence Committee and lead manager for the first Impeachment of Donald Trump, and Jamie Raskin, lead manager for the second Donald Trump impeachment.

In 1978, Tribe published the first version of what has become one of the core texts on its subject, American Constitutional Law. It has since been updated and expanded a number of times.

In 1983, Tribe represented Unification Church leader Sun Myung Moon in the appeal of his federal conviction on income tax charges.

Tribe represented the restaurant Grendel's Den in the case Larkin v. Grendel's Den, Inc., in which the restaurant challenged a Massachusetts law that allowed religious establishments to prohibit liquor sales in neighboring properties. The case reached the United States Supreme Court in 1982 and the court overturned the law as violating the separation of church and state.

In the 1985 National Gay Task Force v. Board of Education Supreme Court case, Tribe represented the National Gay Task Force who had won an Appeals Court ruling against an Oklahoma law that would have allowed schools to fire teachers who were attracted to people of the same sex or spoke in favor of civil rights for gay people. The Supreme Court deadlocked, which left the Appeals Court's favorable ruling in place, declaring the law would have violated the First Amendment.

The Supreme Court ruled against Tribe's client in Bowers v. Hardwick in 1986 and held that a Georgia state law criminalizing sodomy, as applied to consensual acts between persons of the same sex, did not violate fundamental liberties under the principle of substantive due process. However, in 2003 the Supreme Court overruled Bowers in Lawrence v. Texas, a case for which Tribe wrote the ACLU's amicus curiae brief supporting Lawrence, who was represented by Lambda Legal.

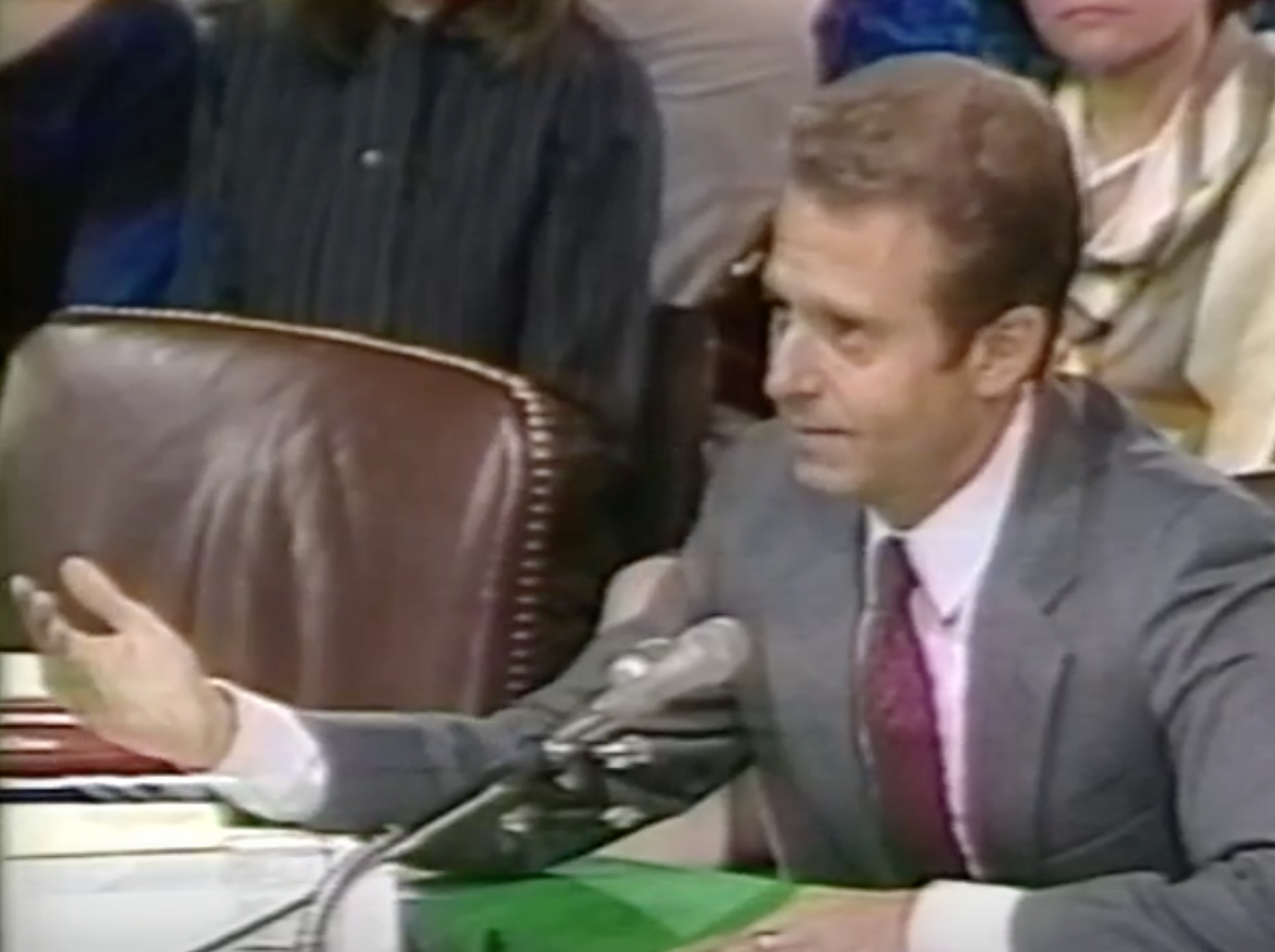
Tribe in 1987

Tribe testified at length during the Senate confirmation hearings in 1987 about the Robert Bork Supreme Court nomination, arguing that Bork's stand on the limitation of rights in the Constitution would be unique in the history of the Court. His participation in the hearings raised his profile outside of the legal realm and he became a target of right-wing critics. His phone was later found to have been wiretapped, but it has never been discovered who had placed the device or why.

Tribe's 1990 book Abortion: Clash of Absolutes, was called "informative, lucidly written and cogently reasoned" in a review in the Journal of the American Bar Association.

In 1992, Tribe reargued Cipollone v. Liggett Group, Inc., before the Supreme Court on behalf of Cipollone.

Tribe was part of Al Gore's legal team regarding the results of the 2000 United States presidential election. Due to the close nature of the vote count, recounts had been initiated in Florida, and the recounts had been challenged in court. Tribe argued the initial case in Federal Court in Miami in which they successfully argued that the court should not stop the recount of the votes which was taking place and scheduled to take place in certain counties. David Boies argued for the Gore team in a related matter in the Florida State Courts regarding the dates that Secretary of State of Florida Katherine Harris would accept recounts. When the original Federal case, Bush v. Gore, was appealed, Gore and his advisers decided at the last minute to have Boies instead of Tribe argue the case at the Supreme Court. The court determined that recounts of votes should cease and that accordingly George W. Bush had been elected president.

=== Free speech and other rights advocacy ===
Since the mid-1990s, Tribe has represented a number of corporations advocating for their free speech rights and constitutional personhood. Tribe represented General Electric in its defense against its liability under the Comprehensive Environmental Response, Compensation and Liability Act ("Superfund"), in which GE and Tribe unsuccessfully argued that the act unconstitutionally violated General Electric's due process rights.

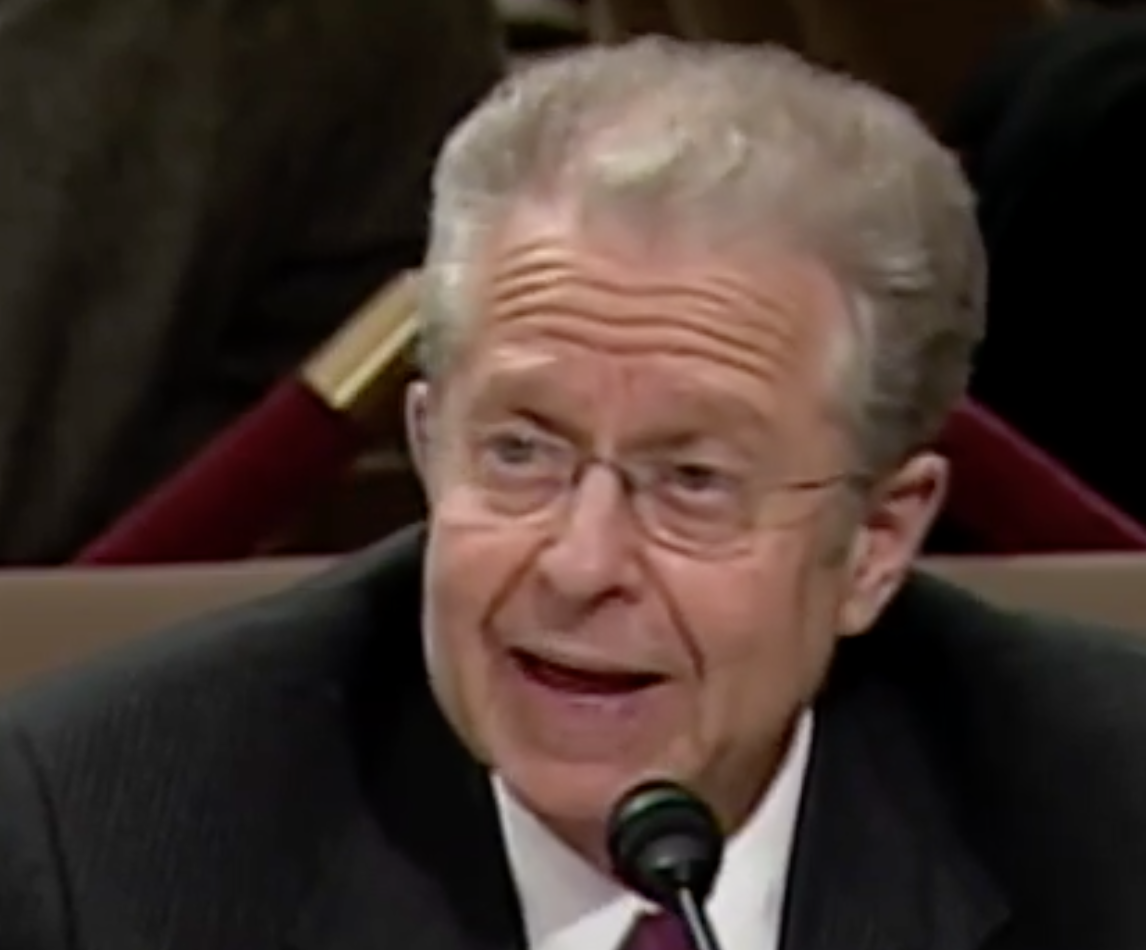
Tribe testifying in front of the Senate Judiciary Committee in 2006

In 2014, Tribe was retained to represent Peabody Energy in a suit against the Environmental Protection Agency. Tribe argued that EPA's use of the Clean Air Act to implement its Clean Power Plan was unconstitutional. Tribe's legal analysis has been criticized by some legal commentators, including fellow Harvard Law School professors Richard J. Lazarus and Jody Freeman, who described his conclusion as "wholly without merit".

Tribe, along with Alan Dershowitz and a number of other scholars at Harvard Law School expressed their support for animal rights including "animal personhood" in 2003.

=== Plagiarism ===
In 2004, Tribe acknowledged having plagiarized several phrases and a sentence in his 1985 book, God Save this Honorable Court, from a 1974 book by Henry Abraham. After an investigation, Tribe was reprimanded by Harvard for "a significant lapse in proper academic practice," but the investigation concluded that Tribe did not intend to plagiarize.

=== Facebook Oversight Board ===
On September 25, 2020, Tribe was named as one of the 25 members of the "Real Facebook Oversight Board", an independent monitoring group over Facebook.

== Political involvement ==
Tribe is one of the co-founders of the liberal progressive American Constitution Society, the law and policy organization formed to counter the conservative Federalist Society.

Tribe served as a judicial adviser to Barack Obama's 2008 presidential campaign. In February 2010, he was named "Senior Counselor for Access to Justice" in the Department of Justice. He resigned eight months later, citing health reasons.

In December 2016, Tribe and notable lawyers Lawrence Lessig and Andrew Dhuey established The Electors Trust under the aegis of Equal Citizens. They provide pro bono legal counsel as well as a secure communications platform for those of the 538 members of the United States Electoral College who were considering a vote of conscience against Donald Trump in the presidential election.

After the dismissal of James Comey in May 2017, Tribe wrote: "The time has come for Congress to launch an impeachment investigation of President Trump for obstruction of justice." Tribe argued that Trump's conduct rose to the level of "high crimes and misdemeanors" that are impeachable offenses under the Constitution. He added: "It will require serious commitment to constitutional principle, and courageous willingness to put devotion to the national interest above self-interest and party loyalty, for a Congress of the president's own party to initiate an impeachment inquiry."

Tribe is on the board of the Renew Democracy Initiative, an American political organization founded in 2017 to promote and defend liberal democracy in the U.S. and abroad.

On August 19, 2023, several legal constitutional scholars, including conservative legal scholar J. Michael Luttig and Tribe, argued that former U.S. President Donald Trump is now barred from presidential office under section 3 of the 14th Amendment because of his alleged support for the January 6 United States Capitol attack.

In 2025, Tribe argued that the power that Elon Musk and his Department of Government Efficiency attempt to exercise over the U.S. federal government is illegal. Tribe says that Musk "absolutely" faces a conflict of interest in his roles as a government contractor and federal employee.

=== Trump conspiracy theories ===
Tribe has stirred controversy due to his promotion of conspiracy theories about Donald Trump's fitness for the presidency. Dartmouth political scientist Brendan Nyhan harshly criticized Tribe, saying that he "has become an important vector of misinformation and conspiracy theories on Twitter." According to McKay Coppins of The Atlantic, Tribe has been "an especially active booster" of the Palmer Report, "a liberal blog known for peddling conspiracy theories". Tribe removed the posted tweets following the Palmer Report and contests the accuracy of the story of controversy.

On August 8, 2023, The New York Times reported that Kenneth Chesebro, who initially laid out "a plot to use false slates of electors to subvert the 2020 election", referred to comments by Tribe, to which Tribe responded that his referred comments were "a gross misrepresentation of my scholarship” by Chesebro, and were "taken out of context".

== Awards and honors ==
Tribe was elected to the American Philosophical Society in 2010. On May 22, 2013, he was presented with an honorary Doctor of Letters degree from Columbia University during its Class of 2013 commencement. He received the American Philosophical Society’s Henry M. Phillips Prize in Jurisprudence (2013).

== Cases ==
The following is a list of cases Tribe has argued in the Supreme Court, as of the end of 2007:

Case	Citation	Year
Richmond Newspapers v. Virginia	448 U.S. 555	1980
Heffron v. International Society for Krishna Consciousness	452 U.S. 640	1981
Crawford v. Board of Education	458 U.S. 527	1982
Larkin v. Grendel’s Den, Inc.	459 U.S. 116	1982
White v. Massachusetts Council	460 U.S. 204	1983
Pacific Gas & Electric v. California	461 U.S. 190	1983
Hawaii Housing Auth. v. Midkiff	467 U.S. 229	1984
Northeast Bancorp v. Fed. Reserve	472 U.S. 159	1985
National Gay Task Force v. Board of Education	470 U.S. 159	1985
Fisher v. City of Berkeley	475 U.S. 260	1986
Bowers v. Hardwick	478 U.S. 186	1986
Pennzoil v. Texaco	481 U.S. 1	1986
Schweiker v. Chilicky	487 U.S. 412	1988
Granfinanciera v. Nordberg	492 U.S. 33	1989
Sable Communications v. FCC	492 U.S. 115	1989
Adams Fruit v. Barrett	494 U.S. 638	1990
Rust v. Sullivan	500 U.S. 173	1991
Cipollone v. Liggett	505 U.S. 504	1992
TXO v. Alliance Resources	509 U.S. 443	1993
Honda Motor Co. v. Oberg	512 U.S. 415	1994
U.S. v. Chesapeake & Potomac Telephone	516 U.S. 415	1996
Timmons v. Twin Cities Area New Party	520 U.S. 351	1997
Vacco v. Quill	521 U.S. 793	1997
Amchem Products v. Windsor	521 U.S. 591	1997
Baker v. General Motors	522 U.S. 222	1998
AT&T v. Iowa Utilities Board	525 U.S. 366	1999
Ortiz v. Fibreboard	527 U.S. 815	1999
Bush v. Palm Beach County Canvassing Board	531 U.S. 70	2000
New York Times Co. v. Tasini	533 U.S. 483	2001
U.S. v. United Foods	533 U.S. 405	2001
FCC v. NextWave	537 U.S. 293	2002
State Farm v. Campbell	538 U.S. 408	2003
Nike v. Kasky	539 U.S. 654	2003
Johanns v. Livestock Marketing Association	544 U.S. 550	2005
Wilkie v. Robbins	551 U.S. 537	2007

Tribe has argued 26 cases in the U.S. Circuit Courts of Appeals:

Case	Citation	Circuit	Year
Worldwide Church of God v. California	623 F.2d 613	9th	1980
Grendel's Den v. Goodwin	662 F.2d 102	1st	1981
Pacific Legal Foundation v. State Energy Resources	659 F.2d 903	9th	1981
United States v. Sun Myung Moon	718 F.2d 1210	2nd	1983
Romany v. Colegio de Abogados	742 F.2d 32	1st	1984
Westmoreland v. CBS	752 F.2d 16	2nd	1984
Colombrito v. Kelly	764 F.2d 122	2nd	1985
Texaco v. Pennzoil	784 F.2d 1133	2nd	1986
U.S. v. Bank of New England	821 F.2d 844	1st	1987
U.S. v. Gallo	859 F.2d 1078	2nd	1988
U.S. v. GAF Corporation	884 F.2d 670	2nd	1989
U.S. v. Western Electric Company	900 F.2d 283	D.C.	1999
Fineman v. Armstrong World Industries	980 F.2d 171	D.C.	1992
U.S. v. Western Electric Company	993 F.2d 1572	D.C.	1993
Lightning Lube v. Witco Corporation	4 F.3d 1153	3rd	1993
Hopkins v. Dow Corning Corporation	33 F.3d 1116	9th	1994
Chesapeake and Potomac Telephone v. U.S.	42 F.3d 181	4th	1994
Georgine v. Amchem Products, Inc.	83 F.3d 610	3rd	1996
BellSouth Corp. v. F.C.C.	144 F.3d 58	D.C.	1998
SBC Communications v. F.C.C.	154 F.3d 226	5th	1998
City of Dallas v. F.C.C.	F.3d 341	5th	1999
U.S. West v. Tristani	"182 F.3d 1202" (PDF). Archived from the original (PDF) on September 20, 2008. (90.5 KB)	10th	1999
U.S. West v. F.C.C.	"182 F.3d 1224" (PDF). Archived from the original (PDF) on September 20, 2008. (220 KB)	10th	1999
Southwest Voter Registration v. Shelley	"344 F.3d 914" (PDF). (23.0 KB)	9th	2003
Pacific Gas and Elec. v. California	"350 F.3d 932" (PDF). (144 KB)	9th	2003
General Electric v. E.P.A.	"360 F.3d 188" (PDF). Archived from the original (PDF) on November 27, 2007. (49.8 KB)	D.C.	2004

== Selected works ==
=== Books ===
- Technology: Processes of Assessment and Choice (1969)
- Environmental Protection (1971; co-author with Louis Jaffe)
- Channeling Technology Through Law (1973)
- The American Presidency: Its Constitutional Structure (1974)
- American Constitutional Law (treatise; 1978, 1979, 1988, and 2000)
- The Supreme Court: Trends and Developments (1979, 1980, 1982, 1983)
- God Save This Honorable Court: How the Choice of Supreme Court Justices Shapes Our History (1985)
- Constitutional Choices (1985)
- Abortion: The Clash of Absolutes (1990)
- On Reading the Constitution (1991; co-author with Michael Dorf)
- The Invisible Constitution (2008)
- Uncertain Justice: The Roberts Court and the Constitution (2014; co-author with Joshua Matz)
- To End a Presidency: The Power of Impeachment (2018; co-author with Joshua Matz)

=== Articles ===
- Tribe, Laurence H. (1970). "An Ounce of Detention: Preventive Justice in the World of John Mitchell". Virginia Law Review. 56 (3): 371–407. JSTOR 1071797.
- — (1971). "Trial by Mathematics: Precision and Ritual in the Legal Process". Harvard Law Review. 84 (6): 1329–93. JSTOR 1339610.
- — (1973). "Technology Assessment and the Fourth Discontinuity: The Limits of Instrumental Rationality". Southern California Law Review. 46 (3): 617–60.
- — (1973). "The Supreme Court, 1972 Term — Foreword: Toward a Model of Roles in the Due Process of Life and Law". Harvard Law Review. 87 (1): 1–53. JSTOR 1339866.
- — (1974). "Triangulating Hearsay". Harvard Law Review. 87 (5): 957–74. JSTOR 1340046.
- — (1974). "Ways Not to Think About Plastic Trees: New Foundations for Environmental Law". Yale Law Journal. 83 (7): 1315–48. JSTOR 795326.
- — (1975). "Structural Due Process". Harvard Civil Rights–Civil Liberties Law Review. 10 (2): 269–312.
- — (1976). "Intergovernmental Federalism in Litigation, Taxation, and Regulation: Separation of Powers Issues in Controversies about Federalism". Harvard Law Review. 89 (4): 682–713. JSTOR 1340218.
- — (1977). "Unraveling National League of Cities: The New Federalism and Affirmative Rights to Essential Government Services". Harvard Law Review. 90 (6): 1065–1104. JSTOR 1340227.
- — (1980). "The Puzzling Persistence of Process-Based Constitutional Theories". Yale Law Journal. 89 (6): 1063–80. JSTOR 796023.
- — (1985). "Constitutional Calculus: Equal Justice or Economic Efficiency?". Harvard Law Review. 98 (3): 592–621. JSTOR 1340870.
- — (1989). "The Curvature of Constitutional Space: What Lawyers Can Learn from Modern Physics". Harvard Law Review. 103 (1): 1–39. JSTOR 1341407.
- —; Dorf, Michael C. (1990). "Levels of Generality in the Definition of Rights". University of Chicago Law Review. 57 (7): 1057–1108.
- — (1995). "Taking Text and Structure Seriously: Reflections on Free-Form Method in Constitutional Interpretation". Harvard Law Review. 108 (6): 1221–1303. JSTOR 1341856.
- — (2004). "Lawrence v. Texas: The 'Fundamental Right' That Dare Not Speak Its Name". Harvard Law Review. 117 (6): 1893–1956. JSTOR 4093306.

== See also ==
- Bill Clinton Supreme Court candidates
- List of law clerks for the eighth seat of the Supreme Court of the United States

== Bibliography ==
- Leila Schneps and Coralie Colmez, Math on trial. How numbers get used and abused in the courtroom, Basic Books, Chapter 2 (2013); ISBN 978-0-465-03292-1.
