= Dent v. West Virginia =

- Supreme Court of the United States

Argued December 11, 1888 Decided January 14, 1889
- Full case name: Dent v. State of West Virginia
- Citations: 129 U.S. 114 (more) 9 S. Ct. 231; 32 L. Ed. 623; 1889 U.S. LEXIS 1669

Holding
- The state can set reasonable requirements to obtain a medical license.

Court membership
- Chief Justice Melville Fuller Associate Justices Samuel F. Miller · Stephen J. Field; Joseph P. Bradley · John M. Harlan; Stanley Matthews · Horace Gray; Samuel Blatchford · Lucius Q. C. Lamar II

Case opinion
- Majority: Field, joined by unanimous

Dent v. West Virginia, 129 U.S. 114 (1889), was an important United States Supreme Court case involving the reputable practice of physicians and state laws in the late 19th century. It was a direct challenge to West Virginia having passed "the nation's first genuinely restrictive physician licensing law in the early 1880s."

== The case ==
Frank Dent was a physician who practiced with his father and grandfather in Newburg, West Virginia. Frank had only apprenticed with his father and practiced for six years when West Virginia passed its Board of Health Act in 1881 requiring either a diploma from a reputable medical college, a certificate showing ten years' practice, or successful passing of a state-administered exam. In 1882 Dent submitted a diploma from the American Eclectic Medical College in Cincinnati, which the Board of Health determined to be a fraudulent eclectic institution. Dent continued practicing and the Board's President, James Reeves, had Dent arrested. Frank Dent turned to his cousin Marmaduke H. Dent, Grafton West Virginia attorney and the first graduate of the West Virginia University for his defense. At his trial in 1883 Frank Dent was found guilty of practicing without a medical license. Marmaduke Dent appealed the decision to the West Virginia Supreme Court on the grounds that the state could not interfere with a citizen's right to practice a lawful trade.

The West Virginia Supreme Court of Appeals heard Dent's case in 1884 and rejected Marmaduke's arguments. M.H. Dent then filed an appeal to the U.S. Supreme Court in 1885 claiming a violation of his cousin's rights under the Due Process Clause of the Fourteenth Amendment. The Supreme Court had a considerable backlog and did not hear the case until 1889.

== The Decision ==
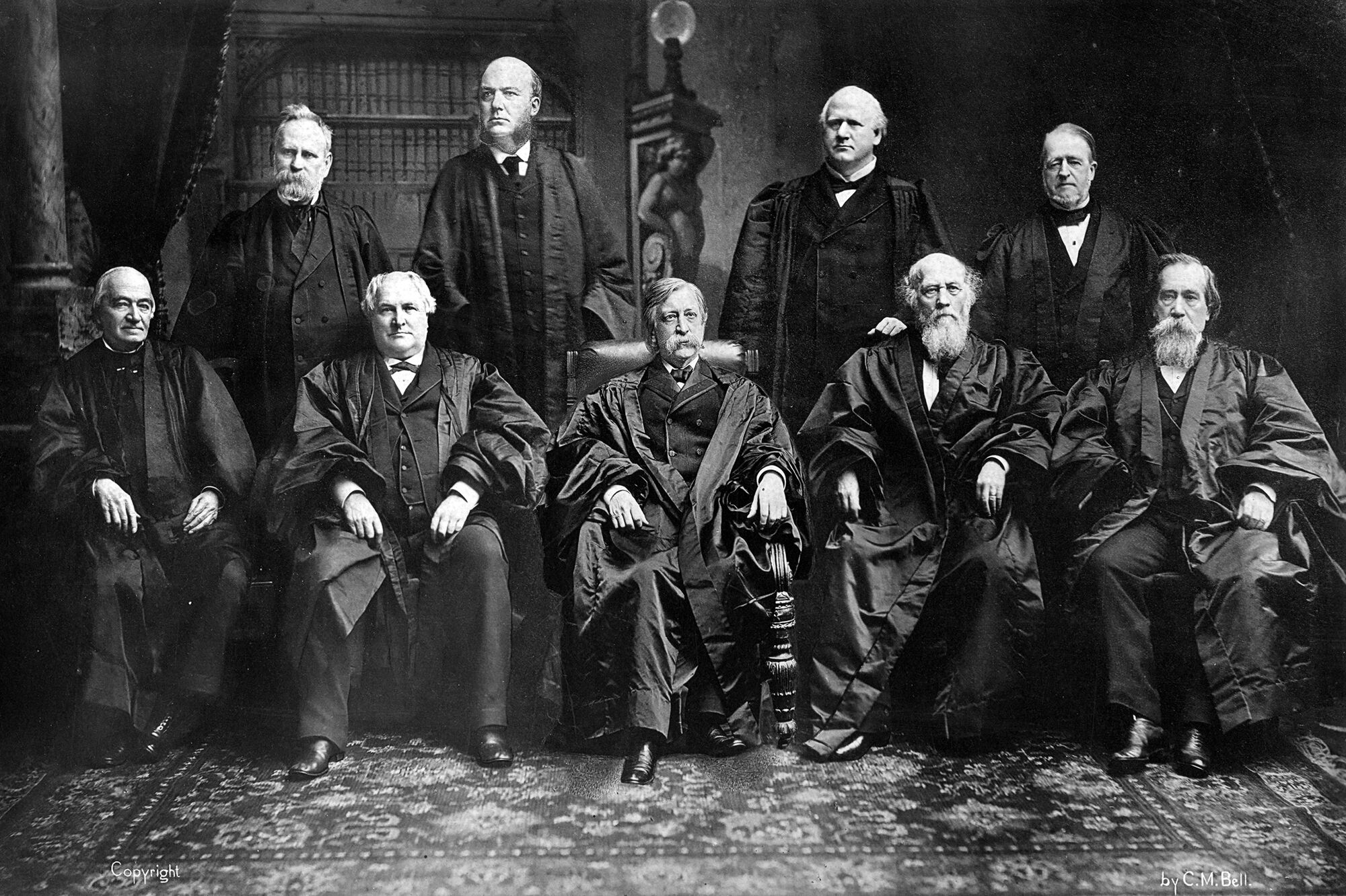
The Fuller Court.

Justice Stephen J. Field delivered the Court's unanimous opinion on January 14, 1889, which upheld the West Virginia statute. Field noted that each citizen had a right to follow any lawful calling, subject to natural restraints such as age, sex, etc., as well as state restrictions, as long as those state restrictions were reasonable. In addition, the Court ruled that medicine, because of the careful nature of its training, the large knowledge of the human body required of doctors, and the nature of life-and-death circumstances with which doctors dealt, reliance needed to be placed on the assurance of a license. Certain circumstances might prompt states to exclude people without licenses from practicing medicine.

== Aftermath ==
Later, the Court would extend its decision in the case Hawker v. New York, 170 U.S. 189 (1898) when it ruled that character was also an important qualification for doctors wishing to obtain a license. As in any Supreme Court case, Dent has been cited numerous times, particularly in defining the legitimate role of state regulation versus Constitutional prohibitions on Bills of Attainder. See, for example SBC Communications, Inc. v. FCC.

== See also ==
- Hawker v. New York, 170 U.S. 189 (1898)
- List of United States Supreme Court cases, volume 129
