= List of United States Supreme Court cases, volume 170 =

Supreme Court of the United States
- Interactive map of Supreme Court of the United States
- 38°53′26″N 77°00′16″W
- Established: March 4, 1789; 236 years ago
- Location: Washington, D.C.
- Coordinates: 38°53′26″N 77°00′16″W
- Composition method: Presidential nomination with Senate confirmation
- Authorised by: Constitution of the United States, Art. III, § 1
- Judge term length: life tenure, subject to impeachment and removal
- Number of positions: 9 (by statute)
- Website: supremecourt.gov

This is a list of cases reported in volume 170 of United States Reports, decided by the Supreme Court of the United States in 1898.

== Justices of the Supreme Court at the time of volume 170 U.S. ==
The Supreme Court is established by Article III, Section 1 of the Constitution of the United States, which says: "The judicial Power of the United States, shall be vested in one supreme Court . . .". The size of the Court is not specified; the Constitution leaves it to Congress to set the number of justices. Under the Judiciary Act of 1789 Congress originally fixed the number of justices at six (one chief justice and five associate justices). Since 1789 Congress has varied the size of the Court from six to seven, nine, ten, and back to nine justices (always including one chief justice).

When the cases in volume 170 were decided the Court comprised the following nine members:

Portrait	Justice	Office	Home State	Succeeded	Date confirmed by the Senate (Vote)	Tenure on Supreme Court
	Melville Fuller	Chief Justice	Illinois	Morrison Waite	July 20, 1888 (41–20)	October 8, 1888 – July 4, 1910 (Died)
	John Marshall Harlan	Associate Justice	Kentucky	David Davis	November 29, 1877 (Acclamation)	December 10, 1877 – October 14, 1911 (Died)
	Horace Gray	Associate Justice	Massachusetts	Nathan Clifford	December 20, 1881 (51–5)	January 9, 1882 – September 15, 1902 (Died)
	David Josiah Brewer	Associate Justice	Kansas	Stanley Matthews	December 18, 1889 (53–11)	January 6, 1890 – March 28, 1910 (Died)
	Henry Billings Brown	Associate Justice	Michigan	Samuel Freeman Miller	December 29, 1890 (Acclamation)	January 5, 1891 – May 28, 1906 (Retired)
	George Shiras Jr.	Associate Justice	Pennsylvania	Joseph P. Bradley	July 26, 1892 (Acclamation)	October 10, 1892 – February 23, 1903 (Retired)
	Edward Douglass White	Associate Justice	Louisiana	Samuel Blatchford	February 19, 1894 (Acclamation)	March 12, 1894 – December 18, 1910 (Continued as chief justice)
	Rufus W. Peckham	Associate Justice	New York	Howell Edmunds Jackson	December 9, 1895 (Acclamation)	January 6, 1896 – October 24, 1909 (Died)
	Joseph McKenna	Associate Justice	California	Stephen Johnson Field	January 21, 1898 (Acclamation)	January 26, 1898 – January 5, 1925 (Retired)

== Notable Case in 170 U.S. ==
=== Williams v. Mississippi ===
In Williams v. Mississippi, 170 U.S. 213 (1898), the Supreme Court upheld provisions of the 1890 Mississippi constitution and its statutes that set requirements for voter registration, including poll tax, literacy tests, the grandfather clause, and the requirement that only registered voters could serve on juries. The plaintiff, Henry Williams, claimed that Mississippi's voting laws were upheld with the intent to disenfranchise African Americans, thus violating the Fourteenth Amendment. The U.S. Supreme Court did not find discrimination in the state's laws because, even though the laws made discrimination possible, the laws themselves did not on the face discriminate against African Americans. The court found that any discrimination toward African Americans was performed by the administrative officers enforcing the law and that (at the time) there was no judicial remedy for this kind of discrimination.

== Citation style ==
Under the Judiciary Act of 1789 the federal court structure at the time comprised District Courts, which had general trial jurisdiction; Circuit Courts, which had mixed trial and appellate (from the US District Courts) jurisdiction; and the United States Supreme Court, which had appellate jurisdiction over the federal District and Circuit courts—and for certain issues over state courts. The Supreme Court also had limited original jurisdiction (i.e., in which cases could be filed directly with the Supreme Court without first having been heard by a lower federal or state court). There were one or more federal District Courts and/or Circuit Courts in each state, territory, or other geographical region.

The Judiciary Act of 1891 created the United States Courts of Appeals and reassigned the jurisdiction of most routine appeals from the district and circuit courts to these appellate courts. The Act created nine new courts that were originally known as the "United States Circuit Courts of Appeals." The new courts had jurisdiction over most appeals of lower court decisions. The Supreme Court could review either legal issues that a court of appeals certified or decisions of court of appeals by writ of certiorari.

Bluebook citation style is used for case names, citations, and jurisdictions.

- "# Cir." = United States Court of Appeals
  - e.g., "3d Cir." = United States Court of Appeals for the Third Circuit
- "C.C.D." = United States Circuit Court for the District of . . .
  - e.g.,"C.C.D.N.J." = United States Circuit Court for the District of New Jersey
- "D." = United States District Court for the District of . . .
  - e.g.,"D. Mass." = United States District Court for the District of Massachusetts
- "E." = Eastern; "M." = Middle; "N." = Northern; "S." = Southern; "W." = Western
  - e.g.,"C.C.S.D.N.Y." = United States Circuit Court for the Southern District of New York
  - e.g.,"M.D. Ala." = United States District Court for the Middle District of Alabama
- "Ct. Cl." = United States Court of Claims
- The abbreviation of a state's name alone indicates the highest appellate court in that state's judiciary at the time.
  - e.g.,"Pa." = Supreme Court of Pennsylvania
  - e.g.,"Me." = Supreme Judicial Court of Maine

== List of cases in volume 170 U.S. ==
Case Name	Page & year	Opinion of the Court	Concurring opinion(s)	Dissenting opinion(s)	Lower Court	Disposition
New York Indians v. United States I	1 (1898)	Brown	none	none	Ct. Cl.	reversed
Leyson v. Davis	36 (1898)	Fuller	none	none	Mont.	dismissed
Budzisz v. Illinois Steel Co.	41 (1898)	Shiras	none	none	C.C.E.D. Wis.	dismissed
Parsons v. District of Columbia	45 (1898)	Shiras	none	none	D.C. Cir.	affirmed
Chicago, et al. R.R. v. Nebraska ex rel. City of Omaha	57 (1898)	Shiras	none	none	Neb.	affirmed
Missouri ex rel. Laclede G.L. Co. v. Murphy	78 (1898)	Fuller	none	none	Mo.	affirmed
Barrow S.S. Co. v. Kane	100 (1898)	Gray	none	none	2d Cir.	certification
The John G. Stevens	113 (1898)	Gray	none	none	2d Cir.	certification
Louisville Water Co. v. Kentucky	127 (1898)	Harlan	none	none	Ky.	reversed
American Surety Co. v. Pauly I	133 (1898)	Harlan	none	none	2d Cir.	affirmed
American Surety Co. v. Pauly II	160 (1898)	Harlan	none	White	2d Cir.	affirmed
Kipley v. Illinois ex rel. Akin I	182 (1898)	Harlan	none	none	Ill.	dismissed
Kipley v. Illinois ex rel. Akin II	183 (1898)	Harlan	none	none	Ill.	dismissed
Hawker v. New York	189 (1898)	Brewer	none	Harlan	N.Y. Ct. Gen. Sess.	affirmed
Kirwan v. Murphy	205 (1898)	Fuller	none	none	8th Cir.	dismissed
Humes v. United States	210 (1898)	McKenna	none	none	C.C.W.D. Tenn.	affirmed
Williams v. Mississippi	213 (1898)	McKenna	none	none	Miss.	affirmed
Galveston, et al. Ry. Co. v. Texas	226 (1898)	Fuller	none	none	Tex. Civ. App.	affirmed
Houston et al. Ry. Co. v. Texas	243 (1898)	Fuller	none	none	Tex. Civ. App.	reversed
Selvester v. United States	262 (1898)	White	Gray (part)	none	N.D. Cal.	affirmed
Calderon v. Atlas S.S. Co.	272 (1898)	Brown	none	none	2d Cir.	reversed
Magoun v. Illinois T. & S. Bank	283 (1898)	McKenna	none	Brewer	C.C.N.D. Ill.	affirmed
Williams v. Eggleston	304 (1898)	Brewer	none	none	Conn.	affirmed
Shaw v. Kellogg	312 (1898)	Brewer	none	none	8th Cir.	reversed
Thompson v. Utah	343 (1898)	Harlan	none	none	Utah	reversed
Virginia & A.C. Co. v. Central R.R. & Banking Co.	355 (1898)	White	none	none	5th Cir.	affirmed
Smith v. United States	372 (1898)	Peckham	none	none	Sup. Ct. Terr. Ariz.	affirmed
Stuart v. City of Easton	383 (1898)	White	none	none	3d Cir.	affirmed
Jolly v. United States	402 (1898)	Peckham	none	none	D. Ky.	affirmed
Havnor v. People	408 (1898)	White	none	none	N.Y. Sup. Ct.	dismissed
Rhodes v. Iowa	412 (1898)	White	none	Gray	Iowa	reversed
Vance v. Vandercook Co. I	438 (1898)	White	none	Shiras (part)	C.C.D.S.C.	multiple
Vance v. Vandercook Co. II	468 (1898)	White	none	none	C.C.D.S.C.	reversed
Andersen v. United States	481 (1898)	Fuller	none	McKenna	C.C.E.D. Va.	affirmed
Plaquemines T.F. Co. v. Henderson	511 (1898)	Harlan	none	none	C.C.E.D. La.	affirmed
United States v. Winston	522 (1898)	Brewer	none	none	9th Cir.	affirmed
United States v. Garter	527 (1898)	Brewer	none	none	Ct. Cl.	affirmed
Texas & P. Ry. Co. v. Reeder	530 (1898)	Brown	none	none	5th Cir.	affirmed
Boyden Power-Brake Co. v. Westinghouse Co.	537 (1898)	Brown	none	none	4th Cir.	reversed
Fink v. United States	584 (1898)	White	none	none	2d Cir.	certification
Wagoner v. Evans	588 (1898)	Shiras	none	none	Sup. Ct. Terr. Okla.	reversed
Provident Life Tr. Co. v. Mercer Cnty.	593 (1898)	Brewer	none	none	6th Cir.	reversed
Ledbetter v. United States	606 (1898)	Brown	none	none	S.D. Iowa	affirmed
New York Indians v. United States II	614 (1898)	per curiam	none	none	Ct. Cl.	reversed
Holloway v. Dunham	615 (1898)	Peckham	none	none	Sup. Ct. Terr. Okla.	affirmed
United States v. Salambier	621 (1898)	Shiras	none	none	2d Cir.	certification
United States v. Lies	628 (1898)	Peckham	none	none	2d Cir.	affirmed
Hayes v. United States	637 (1898)	White	none	none	Ct. Priv. Land Cl.	affirmed
The Carib Prince	655 (1898)	White	none	Brown	2d Cir.	reversed
Texas & P. Ry. Co. v. Archibald	665 (1898)	White	none	none	5th Cir.	affirmed
Kingman Co. v. Western Mfg. Co.	675 (1898)	Fuller	none	none	8th Cir.	reversed
United States v. Coe	681 (1898)	McKenna	none	none	Ct. Priv. Land Cl.	reversed

== See also ==
- Certificate of division
