= Hawker v. New York =

- Supreme Court of the United States

Argued March 9, 1898 Decided April 18, 1898
- Full case name: Hawker v. People of State of New York
- Citations: 170 U.S. 189 (more) 18 S. Ct. 573; 42 L. Ed. 1002; 1898 U.S. LEXIS 1537

Case history
- Prior: Hawker convicted of unlawful practice of medicine
- Subsequent: None

Holding
- Laws may specify past acts (and convictions) as evidence of current qualification for a profession without being considered additional ex post facto punishment.

Court membership
- Chief Justice Melville Fuller Associate Justices John M. Harlan · Horace Gray; David J. Brewer · Henry B. Brown; George Shiras Jr. · Edward D. White; Rufus W. Peckham · Joseph McKenna

Case opinions
- Majority: Brewer, joined by Fuller, Gray, Brown, Shiras, White
- Dissent: Harlan, joined by Peckham, McKenna

Laws applied
- New York state law

Hawker v. New York, 170 U.S. 189 (1898), is a case in which the Supreme Court of the United States upheld a New York state law preventing convicted felons from practicing medicine, even when the felony conviction occurred before the law was enacted.

== Case ==
Dr. Hawker was convicted in 1878 of performing an illegal abortion. He served his time, and then resumed the practice of medicine. In 1893 and 1895, the legislature of the State of New York passed public health laws making it illegal for convicted felons to practice medicine. Dr. Hawker was convicted under this law in 1896, but contended that the law passed after his conviction was putting an additional penalty on him, contrary to the protection from ex post facto laws in Section 9 of Article One of the United States Constitution, also known as the Bill of Attainder.

== Majority opinion ==
Justice Brewer's opinion cites Dent v. West Virginia and other cases which held that states may add new qualifications for practicing medicine that apply to those already in practice. It also cites Jones v. Brim 165 U.S. 180 (1897), which held that the states have a right to classify individuals for application of laws and also Alabama and California cases where the right to vote or to sell liquor (respectively) could be revoked on the basis of a prior conviction when that conviction is reasonable evidence that a person has broken a law, and thus is evidence of insufficient good character to exercise the right.

An exigent threat to patient safety was provided as the reason to revoke Dr. Hawker's medical license. He was not an existential threat when legally practicing. When the law changed, the safety of the public suddenly became of paramount concern and he was disbarred. "It is, no one can doubt, of high importance to the community that health, limb and life should not be left to the treatment of ignorant pretenders and charlatans. It is within the power of the legislature to enact such laws as will protect the people from ignorant pretenders, and secure them the services of reputable, skilled and learned men... To require this is an exercise of the police power for the protection of the public against incompetents and impostors, and is in no sense the creation of a monopoly or special privileges. The door stands open to all who possess the requisite age and good character, and can stand the examination which is exacted of all applicants alike."

== Dissenting opinion ==
Justice Harlan's dissenting opinion contends that this is a case of an ex post facto law, given that the law does not consider the doctor's current fitness for the job, but rather relies on a conviction nearly 20 years old, which he does not consider evidence of current character.

== See also ==
- List of United States Supreme Court cases, volume 170
- Gabriel J. Chin, Are Collateral Sanctions Premised on Conduct or Conviction: The Case of Abortion Doctors, 30 Fordham Urban Law Journal 1685 (2003) (discussing case).
