= Landon v. Plasencia =

- Supreme Court of the United States

Argued February 27, 1982 Decided June 21, 1982
- Full case name: Harold Landon, District Director, Immigration and Naturalization Service v. Rosa Elvira Plasencia
- Citations: 459 U.S. 21 (more) 103 S. Ct. 321; 74 L. Ed. 2d 21

Case history
- Prior: 637 F.2d 213 (3d Cir. 1980)

Holding
- A lawful permanent resident returning to the United States after a brief trip abroad is entitled to due process protections in exclusion proceedings.

Court membership
- Chief Justice Warren E. Burger Associate Justices William J. Brennan Jr. · Byron White; Thurgood Marshall · Harry Blackmun; Lewis F. Powell Jr. · William Rehnquist; John P. Stevens · Sandra Day O'Connor

Case opinion
- Majority: O'Connor, joined by Burger, Brennan, White, Marshall, Blackmun, Powell, Rehnquist, Stevens

Laws applied
- U.S. Const. amend. V

Landon v. Plasencia, 459 U.S. 21 (1982), was a Supreme Court of the United States case holding that a lawful permanent resident returning from a brief trip abroad is entitled to due process protections in exclusion proceedings under the Fifth Amendment to the United States Constitution.

== Background ==
Maria Antonieta Plasencia was born in El Salvador and was admitted to the United States in March 1970 as a lawful permanent resident after marrying a native-born U.S. citizen. Her husband adopted her four children from El Salvador. The family lived together in downtown Los Angeles. In 1975 they travelled to Tijuana, Mexico. She and her husband were arrested by the INS trying to re-enter the country two days later with undocumented immigrants in their vehicle. Maria was given notice that she would have to answer a charge of inadmissibility at an exclusion hearing.

Plasencia was ordered deported following the exclusion hearing. She appealed to the Board of Immigration Appeals (BIA), which rejected the appeal. She then filed a petition for a writ of habeas corpus in the United States District Court, arguing that she should have received deportation proceedings rather than exclusion proceedings because her return from Mexico was not an "entry" into the United States. The district court agreed, overturned the BIA's decision, and ordered the Immigration and Naturalization Service (INS) to pursue deportation proceedings if it chose to continue the case. The United States Court of Appeals for the Ninth Circuit upheld that ruling.

== Legal background ==
Before the enactment of the Immigration and Nationality Act of 1952, Supreme Court decisions broadly construed the concept of "entry," permitting returning permanent residents to be excluded based on conduct that would not have rendered them deportable had they remained continuously in the United States. In Kwong Hai Chew v. Colding (1953), however, the Court recognized that a lawful permanent resident returning from a temporary absence retained Fifth Amendment due process protections and was entitled to a hearing before being excluded. Later that year in Shaughnessy v. United States ex rel. Mezei (1953), the Court held that a returning lawful permanent resident could be denied reentry on national security grounds, emphasizing that, unlike Mezei, Chew had departed the United States with security clearance to serve aboard an American merchant vessel, whereas Mezei had traveled behind the Iron Curtain and sought readmission after a prolonged absence.

The 1952 Act defined "entry" and created an exception for certain lawful permanent residents returning from abroad. The Supreme Court first interpreted that provision in Rosenberg v. Fleuti (1963). The case concerned a lawful permanent resident who had briefly traveled to Mexico and, upon his return, was charged as excludable on a ground that would not have supported his deportation had he remained continuously in the United States. The Court held that an "innocent, casual, and brief" trip abroad did not constitute an "entry" under the Act. It concluded that Congress did not intend lawful permanent residents to become subject to exclusion because of a temporary departure that did not meaningfully interrupt their residence in the United States.

== Supreme Court ==
The Supreme Court began its analysis by examining the statutory framework governing the admission of aliens under the Immigration and Nationality Act, concluding that Plasencia's admissibility could be determined through exclusion proceedings even though she was already a lawful permanent resident. In doing so, the Court distinguished Fleuti, concluding that Plasencia's departure meaningfully interrupted her residence because it was undertaken for a purpose contrary to immigration policy.

Looking to the text and legislative history of the Immigration and Nationality Act, the Court identified a clear congressional intent that exclusion proceedings serve as the exclusive procedure for determining the admissibility of aliens seeking entry into the United States. The Court noted that both the House and Senate committee reports described exclusion hearings as "the sole and exclusive procedure" for determining admissibility. Accordingly, the Court held that the INS properly proceeded by exclusion hearing to determine both whether Plasencia's return constituted an "entry" under the Act and whether she was excludable.

After concluding that the INS properly proceeded through exclusion rather than deportation proceedings, the Court held that Plasencia was protected by the Due Process Clause in an exclusionary proceeding upon returning to the United States. The Court remanded the case to the Ninth Circuit for consideration of whether the exclusionary hearing provided the due process required by Mathews v. Eldridge.

== Theoretical context ==
Landon v. Plasencia arose within the framework of the plenary power doctrine, under which the federal government has broad authority to regulate the admission and exclusion of noncitizens. Historically, this doctrine limited judicial review of immigration decisions, particularly those involving exclusion at the border. Over time, however, the Court has recognized greater constitutional protections for certain categories of noncitizens. These protections developed unevenly, with greater recognition of rights for noncitizens already residing in the United States than for those seeking initial admission, and greater protection for returning lawful permanent residents than for new arrivals.

Landon v. Plasencia addressed this intermediate category by considering whether a lawful permanent resident who briefly left the country retained constitutional due process protections upon return. Despite the gradual recognition of constitutional protections in some areas, immigration law still remains largely outside mainstream American constitutional jurisprudence because of the continuing influence of the plenary power doctrine. The distinction between the rights of noncitizens inside the country and those seeking admission at the border has remained central to immigration law, and Landon v. Plasencia addressed the position of lawful permanent residents who fall between those categories: individuals who have established ties to the United States but are returning from abroad and seeking readmission.

== Significance ==
The application of Mathews balancing in Landon v. Plasencia marked a significant shift in immigration law, where the procedural norm had historically been "no process." By contrasting an individual's interest in entering or remaining in the country with the government's interest in efficient exclusion or removal, the decision provided a new mechanism to challenge administrative procedures. However, legal scholars criticized the Court for not overruling Knauff v. Shaughnessy (1950). Professor Gerald Neuman observed that while Plasencia recognized the "weighty interest" of a lawful permanent resident, its left the plenary power precedents intact.

== Works cited ==
- Aldana, Raquel E. (2022). "Taming Immigration Trauma". Cardozo Law Review. 44 (2): 387–530.
- Balgamwalla, Sabrina (2023). "Commentary on Landon v. Plasencia, 459 U.S. 21 (1982)". In Kim, Kathleen; Lapp, Kevin; Lee, Jennifer J. (eds.). Feminist Judgments: Immigration Law Opinions Rewritten. Cambridge: Cambridge University Press. pp. 105–128.
