= Williams v. Mississippi =

- Supreme Court of the United States

Argued March 18, 1898 Decided April 25, 1898
- Full case name: Henry Williams v. the State of Mississippi
- Citations: 170 U.S. 213 (more) 18 S. Ct. 583; 42 L. Ed. 1012; 1898 U.S. LEXIS 1540

Holding
- There is no discrimination in the state's requirements for voters to pass a literacy test and pay poll taxes, as these were applied to all voters.

Court membership
- Chief Justice Melville Fuller Associate Justices John M. Harlan · Horace Gray; David J. Brewer · Henry B. Brown; George Shiras Jr. · Edward D. White; Rufus W. Peckham · Joseph McKenna

Case opinion
- Majority: McKenna, joined by unanimous
- Superseded by
- Voting Rights Act (1965), 42 U.S.C. §§ 1973–1973aa-6

Williams v. Mississippi, 170 U.S. 213 (1898), is a United States Supreme Court case that reviewed provisions of the 1890 Mississippi constitution and its statutes that set requirements for voter registration, including poll tax, literacy tests, the grandfather clause, and the requirement that only registered voters could serve on juries. The plaintiff, Henry Williams, claimed that Mississippi's voting laws were upheld with the intent to disenfranchise African Americans, thus violating the Fourteenth Amendment. The U.S. Supreme Court did not find discrimination in the state's laws because, even though the laws made discrimination possible, the laws themselves did not discriminate against African Americans. The court found that any discrimination toward African Americans was performed by the administrative officers enforcing the law and that there was no judicial remedy for this kind of discrimination.

== Background ==
The 1890 Mississippi constitution included disenfranchisement clauses, including a poll tax, literacy tests, a grandfather clause, and a voter registration for jury members. The poll tax and literacy clauses disproportionately affected African Americans, who tended to be less wealthy and less educated than whites due to lack of resources. The grandfather clause, which allowed voters to automatically be registered if their grandfather had voted, effectively exempted illiterate whites, but not blacks, from the literacy test. Blacks received the right to vote in 1870 under the Fifteenth Amendment, so almost no African Americans at this time had voting grandfathers because they were among the first generations of African American voters. Jury members were required to be registered voters, which meant that most jury members were white, since there were so many obstacles presented to African Americans to keep them from voting. Mississippi's constitution itself was ratified by a constitutional convention of 134, of which all but one member were white. The members of the constitutional convention also refused to submit the constitution to the state's voters for approval, instead ordering it to be adopted immediately.

== Trial ==
In 1896 in the Circuit Court of Washington County, Mississippi, the plaintiff, Henry Williams, had been indicted for murder of a woman named Eliza Brown by an all-white grand jury, and convicted by an all-white petit jury and sentenced to be hanged. The plaintiff challenged the jury selection as the jury was selected from eligible voters and the plaintiff alleged the trial was inappropriate as the "defendant's race would have been represented impartially on the grand jury which presented this indictment," and that he was deprived of equal protection under the law. He made a motion to quash the indictment on the grounds that the jury was selected under discriminatory laws in Mississippi's constitution, which violated the Fourteenth Amendment. His motion was denied because, according to the court, the law itself was written in a way that it could be applied to everyone. Williams then made a motion for the case to be taken to federal court, which was denied; he made another motion for a retrial, which was also denied.

== Appeals ==
An appeal was taken by the Mississippi Supreme Court. Williams made the same argument that the jury that convicted him was made under discriminatory laws, but the Mississippi Supreme Court upheld the ruling that the laws themselves were not discriminatory. Williams appealed to the U.S. Supreme Court, which took the case in 1898, with the argument that the voting laws in the 1890 Mississippi Constitution violated the Fourteenth Amendment.

== Decision ==
The U.S. Supreme Court unanimously rejected Williams' contention in a 9–0 vote, ruling that he had not shown that the administration of the Mississippi suffrage provision was discriminatory. Justice Joseph McKenna wrote the opinion, stating, “The constitution of Mississippi and its statutes do not on their face discriminate between the races, and it has not been shown that their actual administration was evil; only that evil was possible under them.” This statement held even after the state admitted that its administration of these provisions had been carried out with a discriminatory intent. Essentially, the court ruled that, since the laws had the potential to be applied to anyone, they were technically nondiscriminatory. Any targeting of African Americans specifically was the result of bias in the people enforcing the laws; the laws themselves did not discriminate, they only gave administrative officers the option to discriminate, which was not in violation of the Fourteenth Amendment.

== Aftermath ==
Other southern states created new constitutions with provisions similar to those of Mississippi's through 1908, effectively disenfranchising hundreds of thousands of blacks and tens of thousands of poor whites for decades.

Although some northern Congressmen proposed reducing southern states' apportionment of seats in the House of Representatives to reflect the numbers of African Americans who were disenfranchised, no action was passed. With one-party rule, white Southern Democrats had a powerful voting bloc which they exercised for decades, for instance, to reject any Federal legislation against lynching. (See Section Two of the 14th Amendment.)

The Supreme Court indirectly overturned one aspect of this decision in Guinn v. United States in 1915 where it held that the use of grandfather clauses to enable whites to avoid the literacy tests used to exclude blacks was unconstitutional. In 2023 the Supreme Court refused to consider reviewing the felonies, in a case arguing that their perpetuation and continued enforcement under the Mississippi Constitution was still tainted by an original intent to disproportionately disenfranchise African-American Mississippians. Justice Ketanji Brown Jackson, in dissent, argued that 'mere time cannot insulate from constitutional challenge a law that was invidious from its inception'.

=== Williams' case ===
After the U.S. Supreme Court effectively upheld Williams' death sentence, he petitioned Mississippi governor Anselm J. McLaurin for clemency; McLaurin denied Williams' petition. Williams was executed by hanging in the county jail's yard, located in Greenville, Mississippi (the county seat of Washington County), on September 30, 1899, over three years after Brown's murder.

== See also ==
- Plessy v. Ferguson
- List of United States Supreme Court cases, volume 170
