= Larkin v. Grendel's Den, Inc. =

- Supreme Court of the United States

Argued October 4, 1982 Decided December 13, 1982
- Full case name: John P. Larkin et al. v. Grendel's Den, Inc.
- Docket no.: 81-878
- Citations: 459 U.S. 116 (more)

Holding
- Section 16C violates the Establishment Clause.

Court membership
- Chief Justice Warren E. Burger Associate Justices William J. Brennan Jr. · Byron White; Thurgood Marshall · Harry Blackmun; Lewis F. Powell Jr. · William Rehnquist; John P. Stevens · Sandra Day O'Connor

Case opinions
- Majority: Burger, joined by Brennan, White, Marshall, Blackmun, Powell, Stevens, O'Connor
- Dissent: Rehnquist

Larkin v. Grendel's Den, Inc., 459 U.S. 116 (1982), was a United States Supreme Court case dealing with the enforcement of liquor laws by a non-government entity. Massachusetts had established a law that allowed any church or school located within 500 feet (150 m) of an establishment seeking a liquor license to object to that license. The Supreme Court, in an 8–1 decision, ruled that Massachusetts' law violated the Establishment Clause as it delegated powers normally reserved to the government to non-government entities and would allow decisions to be made along religious lines, effectively advancing religious purposes.

== Background ==
Massachusetts' liquor laws are overseen by the Alcoholic Beverages Control Commission (ABCC). Many of these laws are based on "blue laws", designed to prevent people from drinking on Sundays due to the state's Puritan heritage. After the end of Prohibition in the 1930s, the state began loosening liquor laws but still kept numerous blue laws on the books. One such law was Mass. General Laws chapter 138, Section 16C, first introduced in 1954, which prohibited any establishment within 500 feet (150 m) of a church or school from having a liquor license. The absolute ban on liquor licenses was amended in 1968 and 1970, allowing intuitions near churches or schools to have a license, but only if no church or school within that distance filed a formal objection to the license with the ABCC.

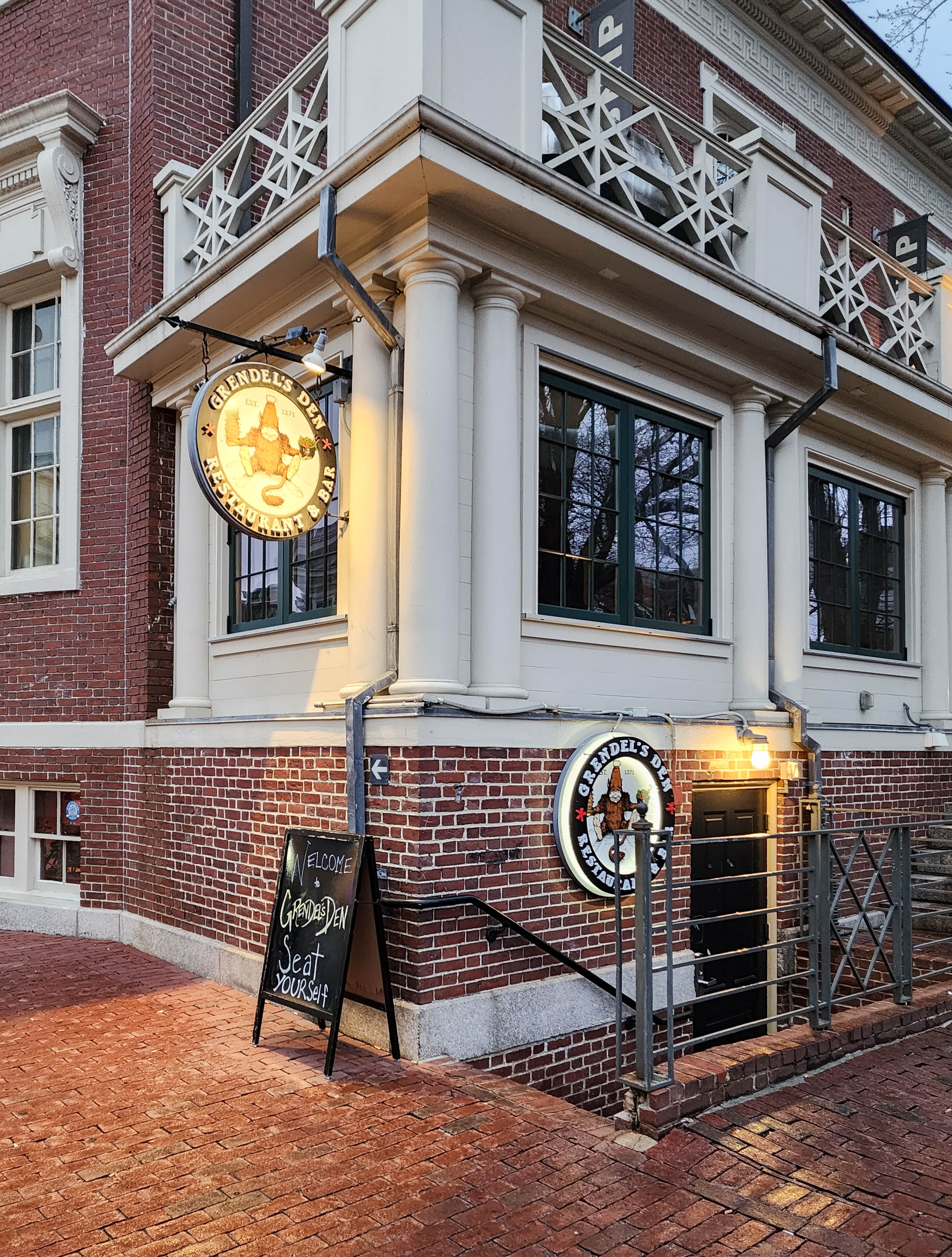
Grendel's Den in Cambridge, Massachusetts

Grendel's Den, a restaurant in Cambridge, Massachusetts, opened in 1971 and became a popular spot for students and professors of nearby Harvard University. In 1977, the owners applied for a liquor license through the local Cambridge License Commission. Holy Cross Church, which shared a 10 feet (3.0 m)-wide alley with the restaurant, filed an objection to the license, stating that there already too many establishments with liquor licenses in the area as part of their rationale. Pursuant to Mass. General Laws chapter 138, Section 16C, the Cambridge License Commission denied Grendel's Den the license due to the church's objection.

The owners appealed to the ABCC, addressing that numerous other establishments within the 500-ft range of Holy Cross Church had successfully received licenses. The ABCC upheld the Cambridge License Commission's decision. The owners then took their case to the United States District Court for the District of Massachusetts, claiming that Section 16C violated the Establishment Clause of the First Amendment, the Equal Protection Clause and the Due Process Clause of the Fourteenth Amendment, and antitrust components of the Sherman Act. The District Court found in favor of Grendel's Den in 1980, ruling that Section 16C was unconstitutional and violated the Establishment Clause. The judge used a three-pronged test that the Supreme Court had previously established in Everson v. Board of Education (330 U.S. 1 (1947)) and later enumerated in Lemon v. Kurtzman (403 U.S. 602 (1971)). In the decision, the judge determined that Section 16C had the primary effect of advancing religion, with the objection power one that could be misused, such as if a church did not objected to establishments where the owners shared the same faith or had made a significant donation to the church.

The state appealed to the First Circuit Appellate Court, which initially the three-judge panel decided to reverse the District Court's ruling. The restaurant owners requested an en banc hearing at the First Circuit, and the full panel of judges reversed the three-panel decision, again ruling that Section 13C violated the Establishment Clause.

== Supreme Court ==
The state petitioned to the Supreme Court, which the Court granted certiorari and heard during the 1982 term.

The Court gave its decision on December 13, 1982, upholding the en banc decision of the First Circuit that Section 16C was unconstitutional. Chief Justice Warren E. Burger wrote the majority opinion, joined by all but Justice William Rehnquist. Burger's opinion reviewed only the Establishment Clause considerations that had been at review at the First Circuit and applied the Lemon three-pronged test to determine if Section 16C was unconstitutional.

1. Section 16C was considered to have a secular purpose, as it was in the state's interest to regulate liquor use, though Burger wrote that the state could implement this through other means such as absolute bans of liquor licenses near churches, or to allow churches to voice objections during a license hearing.
2. Section 16C failed the second prong of the Lemon test in Burger's opinion as the law advanced religious interest, giving churches a standardless veto power on a function normally performed by the government, and had made no assurance that churches would object in a neutral manner.
3. Section 16C also failed the third prong of the Lemon test because it created entanglement between church and state. Besides granting a veto power to the church, Burger stated that the law could also lead to "political fragmentation and divisiveness" along the lines of the church's faith.

Judge Rehnquist, in his dissent, agreed that Section 16C would be better implemented by an absolute ban on liquid licenses within a certain distance from the church, but disagreed with the remaining three-pronged analysis that the law violated the Establishment Clause, particularly that he did not believe the law was advancing any religious interest.
