= List of United States Supreme Court cases, volume 459 =

This is a list of all United States Supreme Court cases from volume 459 of the United States Reports:

Case name	Citation	Date decided
California ex rel. State Lands Comm'n v. United States	459 U.S. 1	1982
Anderson v. Harless	459 U.S. 4	1982
INS v. Miranda	459 U.S. 14	1982
Landon v. Plasencia	459 U.S. 21	1982
Wyrick v. Fields	459 U.S. 42	1982
Griggs v. Provident Consumer Discount Co.	459 U.S. 56	1982
United States v. Sec. Indus. Bank	459 U.S. 70	1982
Gillette Co. v. Miner	459 U.S. 86	1982
Brown v. Socialist Workers '74 Campaign Comm. (Ohio)	459 U.S. 87	1982
Larkin v. Grendel's Den, Inc.	459 U.S. 116	1982
Burlington N. Inc. v. United States	459 U.S. 131	1982
Xerox Corp. v. Harris Cnty.	459 U.S. 145	1982
City of Port Arthur v. United States	459 U.S. 159	1982
Colorado v. New Mexico	459 U.S. 176	1982
Fed. Election Comm'n v. Nat'l Right to Work Comm.	459 U.S. 197	1982
Bowen v. Postal Service	459 U.S. 212	1983
Pillsbury Co. v. Conboy	459 U.S. 248	1983
Director v. Perini N. River Associates	459 U.S. 297	1983
Shepard v. NLRB	459 U.S. 344	1983
Missouri v. Hunter	459 U.S. 359	1983
Herman & MacLean v. Huddleston	459 U.S. 375	1983
Memphis Bank & Tr. Co. v. Garner	459 U.S. 392	1983
Energy Reserves Group, Inc. v. Kan. Power & Light Co.	459 U.S. 400	1983
Marshall v. Lonberger	459 U.S. 422	1983
Hewitt v. Helms	459 U.S. 460	1983
Community Tel. v. Gottfried	459 U.S. 498	1983
Associated Gen. Contractors v. Carpenters	459 U.S. 519	1983
South Dakota v. Neville	459 U.S. 553	1983
California v. Ramos	459 U.S. 1301	1982
KPNX Broadcasting Co. v. Super. Ct.	459 U.S. 1302	1982
Conforte v. Comm'r	459 U.S. 1309	1983
Bonura v. CBS, Inc.	459 U.S. 1313	1983
Jaffree v. Bd. of School Comm'rs	459 U.S. 1314	1983
