= Grendel's Den =

Coordinates: 42°21′38.06″N 71°07′16.93″W

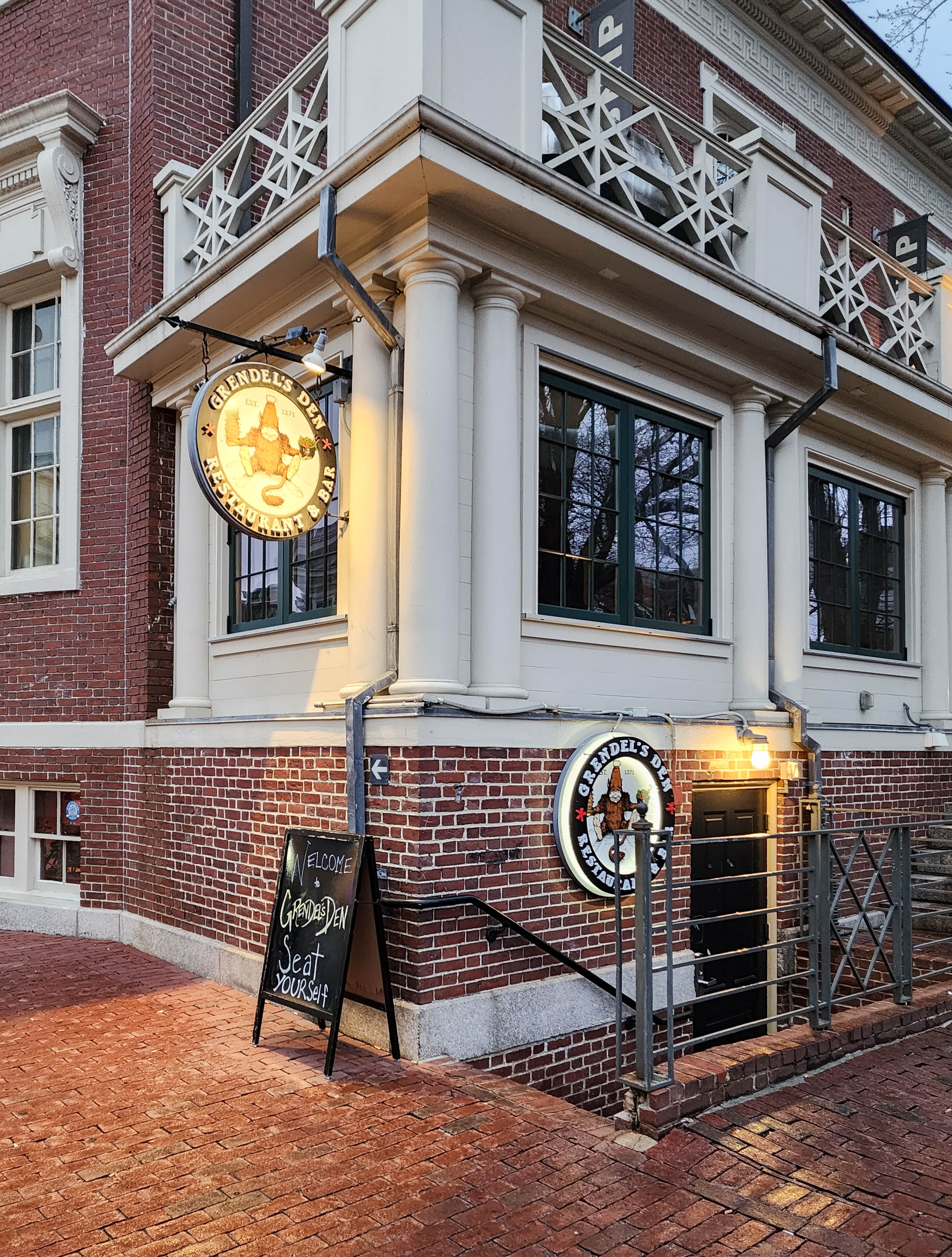
- Interactive map of Grendel's Den

Restaurant information
- Established: 1971
- Location: Cambridge, Massachusetts, United States
- Website: Official website

Grendel's Den is a bar and restaurant in Harvard Square in Cambridge, Massachusetts, located at 89 Winthrop Street. The establishment is frequented by both students and professors of Harvard University as well as many others from the Cambridge and Boston area. The name is a reference to Grendel, the antagonist in the Old English epic Beowulf.

The restaurant is famous for the lawsuit Larkin v. Grendel's Den, Inc., 459 U.S. 116 (1982), which reached the Supreme Court of the United States in 1982. The suit challenged the Massachusetts state blue law (16C) allowing a school or a religious institution within 500 feet of a liquor license applicant to prevent the issuance. The United States District Court for the District of Massachusetts ruled in favor of Grendel's Den, holding that the law violated the Establishment Clause of the First Amendment. The Supreme Court upheld the ruling of the lower court.

The restaurant is also a favorite of actor and director Ben Affleck, who shot portions of his 2010 film The Town there.

== History ==
Opened in 1971 by Sue and Herbert Külzer, the bar was given its name by Sue, guided by her BA in literature and by the bar's location under a business called The Troll's Club. It was originally home to Harvard's Pi Eta Club, a now defunct final club.
