= SBC Communications, Inc. v. FCC =

United States legal case

- Court: United States Court of Appeals for the Fifth Circuit
- Full case name: SBC Communications, Inc. v. FCC
- Decided: September 4, 1998
- Citations: 154 F.3d 226; 1998-2 Trade Cases ¶ 72,256

Court membership
- Judges sitting: E. Grady Jolly, Jerry Edwin Smith, Rhesa Barksdale

Case opinions
- Majority: Jolly, joined by Barksdale
- Dissent: Smith

SBC Communications, Inc. v. FCC, 154 F.3d 226 (5th Cir. 1998), was a case decided by the United States Court of Appeals for the Fifth Circuit that upheld §§ 271-275 of the Telecommunications Act of 1996 as constitutional against a challenge that the provisions acted as a bill of attainder.

== Factual background ==
Sections 271-275 of the Telecommunications Act of 1996 place limitations on the entrance of the Regional Bell Operating Companies (RBOCs) into the in-region long-distance service market. SBC Communications challenged these provisions as a bill of attainder that singled out the RBOCs for punishment.

== Decision ==
The Fifth Circuit upheld the statute, holding that §§ 271-275 were not punitive in nature and thus could not be considered a bill of attainder.
