= Railroad Labor Board =

Defunct US federal board (1920–1926)

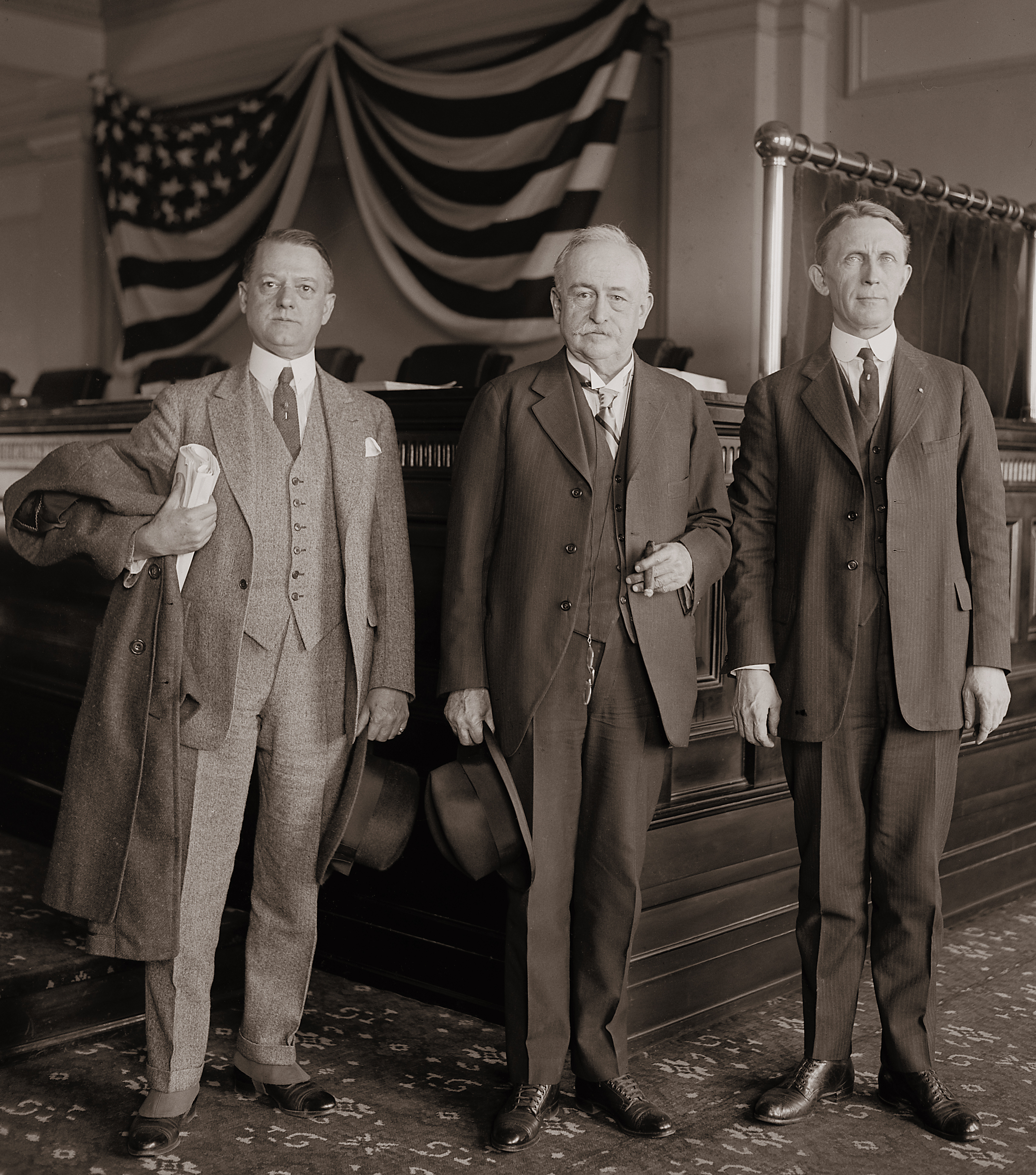
G.W.W. Hanger, R.M. Barton, and Chairman Ben W. Hooper of the Railroad Labor Board in 1921

The Railroad Labor Board (RLB) was an institution established in the United States of America by the Transportation Act of 1920. This nine-member panel was designed as means of settling wage disputes between railway companies and their employees. The Board's approval of wage reductions for railroad shopmen was instrumental in triggering the Great Railroad Strike of 1922. The Board was terminated on May 20, 1926, when President Calvin Coolidge signed a new Railway Labor Act into law.

== Institutional history ==
=== Background ===
Following major expansion of American railways after the American Civil War, labor disputes increasingly became a focus of turmoil between employers and employees, first evidenced at a large, multi-state scale during the Great Railroad Strike of 1877. With the continued functioning of the railways seen as a vital public interest, Congress had attempted to solve wage disputes through legislation as early as 1888, when an initial mechanism for voluntary arbitration was created. Such voluntary arbitration had lacked an enforcement mechanism, however, and labor unrest continued unabated.

Various attempts at stopgap legislation proved largely unfruitful, although the Erdman Act of 1898 did establish a more precise mechanism for mediating disputes between employers and those workers engaged in train operation. This voluntary mediation was resisted by the railroad companies and very seldom used until 1906. In the subsequent eight years between 1906 and 1913, a total of 61 disputes were settled by mediation or arbitration.

Despite this seeming success, neither the railroad companies nor the various unions representing railway employees were satisfied with either the process or the decisions rendered. Calls were made for a substantially-sized permanent board of arbitration, with representatives of the railroad companies rather than the unions taking the lead in calling for such a body.

The result this desire for permanent, professional mediation of railway wage disputes was the passage of the Newlands Labor Act in 1913. This legislation expanded and formalized the mediation and arbitration process, establishing a three-member "Board of Mediation and Conciliation" and increasing the number of professional arbitrators to six. Although still lacking the power to enforce its decisions, the Newlands Act was successful in resolving 58 of the 71 controversies which were managed by the Board, from the time of the Act's passage through 1917.

=== Establishment ===
During the period of American participation in World War I, operation of the American railway system was brought under national control to ensure efficient operation. The United States Railroad Administration (USRA) was created to manage the entire system. President Woodrow Wilson issued an order for nationalization in 1917, and Congress affirmed the action in 1918 with the Railway Administration Act. The USRA consolidated railroad operations, eliminated redundant services, standardized equipment, and raised wages for railroad workers.

Following the end of the war, Congress passed the Transportation Act of 1920 (also called the Esch-Cummins Act), which returned control to the railroad companies, gave additional regulatory powers to the Interstate Commerce Commission, and established the Railroad Labor Board.

President Warren Harding appointed Ben W. Hooper as board chairman in 1921. Hooper was a former Republican governor of Tennessee.

=== Authority and decisions of the board ===
The 1920 law gave the board the power to oversee the wages and working conditions of more than 2 million American railway workers.

The RLB soon destroyed whatever moral authority it might have had in a series of decisions. In 1921 railway companies obtained approval from the board for deep reductions in wage rates for workers across the industry. In 1922 the RLB approved another cut in wages, this time a cut of 7 cents an hour targeted to railway repair and maintenance workers—a reduction representing a loss of an average of 12 percent for these workers.

=== Role in the 1922 Shopmen's Strike ===
Chairman Hooper found the situation faced by members of the Railroad Labor Board to be virtually untenable, likening the task of conciliating the demands of the "hardboiled railway executive" and the "radical labor leader" armed only with the "gentle, unenforceable admonitions of the Transportation Act" to pacifying a den of lions and tigers with bare hands. In response to the wage cuts, as well as the pressures of the Open Shop Movement (whereby the railway companies contracted out shop work to non-union subcontractors), seven unions representing the railroad shopmen and maintenance of way workers voted to go on strike. July 1, 1922, was the date set for the launch of a coordinated work stoppage. On that day some 400,000 railway workers walked off the job, in what became known as the Great Railroad Strike of 1922.

On July 3, Hooper pushed through a so-called "outlaw resolution" which declared that all strikers had forfeited their arbitration rights guaranteed under the Transportation Act of 1920. Railroads were encouraged by the Railway Labor Board to hire replacement workers, who were to be regarded as permanent by the board. Bitter labor discord followed, with violence and sabotage of railway equipment. The RLB attempted to mediate an end to the dispute, bringing together union and railroad representatives on July 14 in a joint conference. The conference was unsuccessful and the board declared that its efforts to resolve the stoppage had reached an end.

Members of President Harding's cabinet, Secretary of Commerce Herbert Hoover and Secretary of Labor John Davis, sought a negotiated end to the strike. Harding proposed a settlement on July 28, but this compromise was rejected by the railroad companies. United States Attorney General Harry M. Daugherty obtained a court injunction against the strike on September 1, and the strike eventually died out as many shopmen made deals with the railroads on the local level.

=== Termination ===
Negotiations between the major railroad companies and the unions led to the enactment of the Railway Labor Act of 1926 (RLA). President Calvin Coolidge signed the law on May 20, 1926, and the Railroad Labor Board was terminated. The RLA repealed Title III of the Transportation Act of 1920 and created a Board of Mediation.

== See also ==
- History of rail transport in the United States
- American Railway Union
- Railway Labor Executives' Association
