= Newlands Labor Act =

- Other short titles: Newlands Act
- Long title: An Act providing for mediation, conciliation, and arbitration in controversies between certain employers and their employees.
- Enacted by: the 63rd United States Congress
- Effective: July 15, 1913

Citations
- Public law: Public Law 63-6
- Statutes at Large: 38 Stat. 103

Codification
- Acts repealed: Arbitration Act of 1888

Legislative history
- Introduced in the Senate as S. 2517 by D‑NV Francis G. Newlandsth on June 10, 1913; Committee consideration by Senate Committee on Interstate Commerce; Passed the Senate on June 26, 1913 (Voice vote); Passed the House on July 15, 1913 (Voice vote); Signed into law by President Woodrow Wilson on July 15, 1913

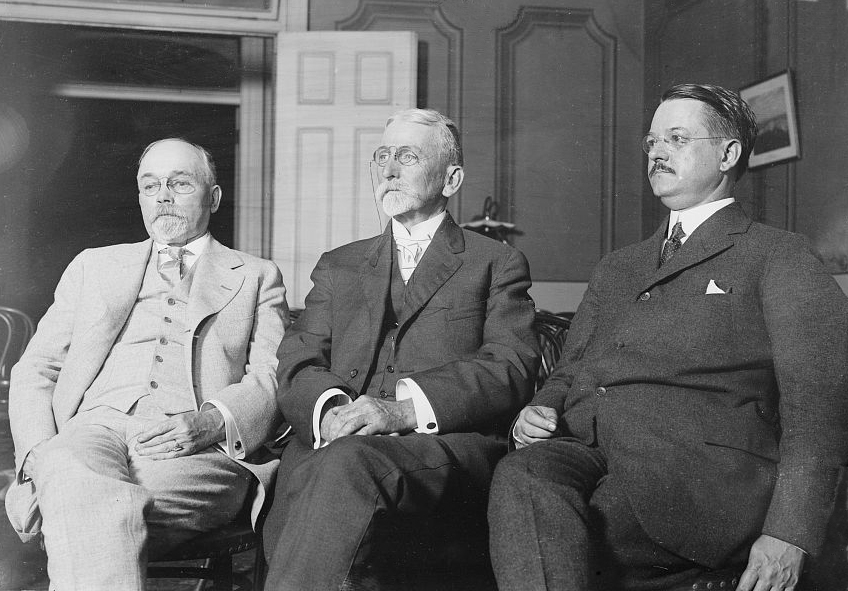
Martin Augustine Knapp, William Lea Chambers and George Wallace William Hanger in 1913

The Newlands Labor Act was a 1913 United States federal law, sponsored by Senator Francis G. Newlands of Nevada and drafted by Bureau of Labor Statistics Commissioner Charles Patrick Neill. It created the Board of Mediation and Conciliation (BMC). The BMC was a precursor to today's National Mediation Board (NMB).

== Background ==
In response to railroad strikes during the 1870s and 1880s, Congress passed the Arbitration Act of 1888, which authorized the creation of arbitration panels with the power to investigate the causes of labor disputes and to issue non-binding arbitration awards. The Act was a complete failure: only one panel was ever convened under the Act, and that one, in the case of the 1894 Pullman Strike, issued its report only after the strike had been crushed by a federal court injunction backed by federal troops.

Congress attempted to correct these shortcomings in the Erdman Act, passed in 1898. This law likewise provided for voluntary arbitration, but made any award issued by the panel binding and enforceable in federal court. It also outlawed discrimination against employees for union activities, prohibited "yellow dog" contracts (employee agrees not to join a union while employed), and required both sides to maintain the status quo during any arbitration proceedings and for three months after an award was issued. The arbitration procedures were rarely used.

== Newlands Act and the BMC ==
President Woodrow Wilson signed the Newlands Act on July 15, 1913. The law created the Board of Mediation and Conciliation, which was administered by U.S. Commerce and District Court Judge Martin Augustine Knapp and assisted by U.S. Alabama District Court Judge and Commissioner William Lea Chambers. The Board adjusted and arbitrated disputes between railroad companies and their operating employees, where those disputes threatened to interrupt operation of the carriers to the "serious detriment of the public interest." Voluntary arbitration was also provided for those disputes that could not be settled by mediation.

The Board was functionally replaced on December 26, 1917, by the creation of the United States Railroad Administration, although it continued to exist with its activities restricted to short-line railroads. In 1920, the Esch–Cummins Act (formally called the Transportation Act) created a new Railroad Labor Board which regulated wages and settled disputes, and permanently replaced the duties of the BMC.

On May 20, 1926, Congress repealed the Newlands Labor Act and Title III of the Esch–Cummins Act (which pertained to labor disputes), with the enactment of the Railway Labor Act.

== See also ==
- History of rail transport in the United States
