= Martin Augustine Knapp =

American judge (1843–1923)

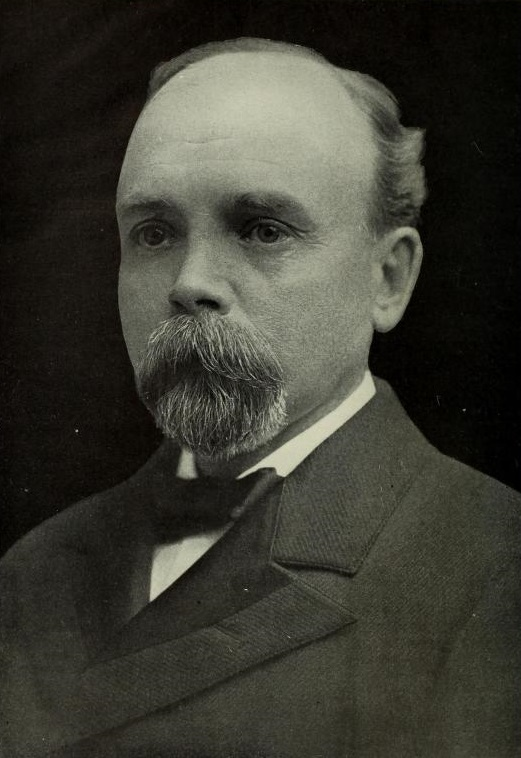

Judge of the United States Court of Appeals for the Fourth Circuit
- In office January 1, 1916 – February 10, 1923
- Appointed by: operation of law
- Preceded by: Seat established by 36 Stat. 539
- Succeeded by: Seat abolished

Judge of the United States Court of Appeals for the Second Circuit
- In office December 20, 1910 – January 1, 1916
- Appointed by: William Howard Taft
- Preceded by: Seat established by 36 Stat. 539
- Succeeded by: Seat abolished

Judge of the United States Circuit Courts for the Second Circuit
- In office December 20, 1910 – December 31, 1911
- Appointed by: William Howard Taft
- Preceded by: Seat established by 36 Stat. 539
- Succeeded by: Seat abolished

Judge of the United States Commerce Court
- In office December 20, 1910 – December 13, 1913
- Appointed by: William Howard Taft
- Preceded by: Seat established by 36 Stat. 539
- Succeeded by: Seat abolished

Personal details
- Born: Martin Augustine Knapp; November 6, 1843 Spafford, New York
- Died: February 10, 1923 (aged 79) Washington, D.C.
- Education: Wesleyan University (BA) read law
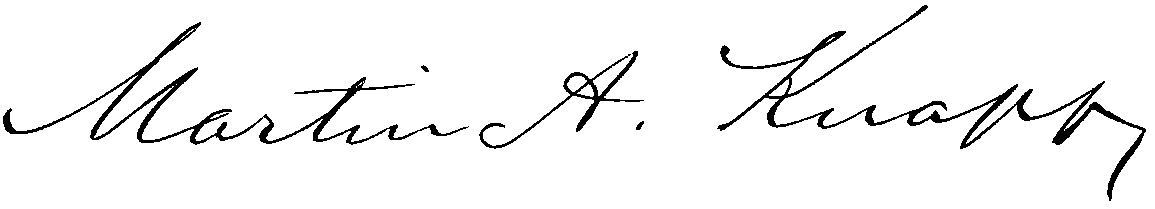
- Signature

Martin Augustine Knapp (November 6, 1843 – February 10, 1923) was a United States circuit judge of the United States Commerce Court, the United States Court of Appeals for the Second Circuit, the United States Circuit Courts for the Second Circuit and the United States Court of Appeals for the Fourth Circuit.

== Education and career ==
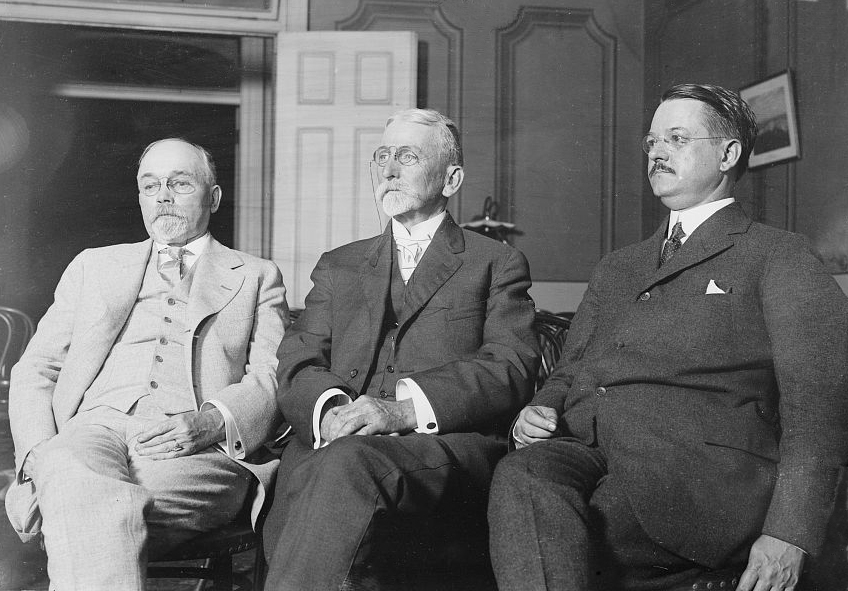
Martin Augustine Knapp, William Lea Chambers and George Wallace William Hanger in 1913

Born in Spafford, New York, Knapp received a Bachelor of Arts degree from Wesleyan University in 1868 and read law to enter the bar in 1869. He entered private practice in Syracuse, New York in 1870, and was counsel for the municipal corporation of Syracuse 1877 to 1883. In 1891, he was appointed to the Interstate Commerce Commission by President Benjamin Harrison, reappointed in 1897 by President Grover Cleveland, and again reappointed in 1902 by President Theodore Roosevelt, becoming Chairman of the Commission from 1898, where he served until 1910. Under the Erdman Act as ex officio mediator, he assisted in the work of settlement of numerous disputes between the public and the railroads.

== Federal judicial service ==
Knapp was nominated by President William Howard Taft on December 12, 1910, to the United States Commerce Court, the United States Court of Appeals for the Second Circuit and the United States Circuit Courts for the Second Circuit, to a new joint seat authorized by 36 Stat. 539. He was confirmed by the United States Senate on December 20, 1910, and received his commission the same day. On December 31, 1911, the Circuit Courts were abolished and he thereafter served on the Commerce Court and Court of Appeals. On December 13, 1913, the Commerce Court was abolished and he thereafter served only on the Court of Appeals. Knapp was reassigned by operation of law to the United States Court of Appeals for the Fourth Circuit on January 1, 1916, to a new seat authorized by 36 Stat. 539. His service terminated on February 10, 1923, due to his death in Washington, D.C.

== Other service and memberships ==
Knapp was appointed a mediator for two years from March 4, 1911, becoming member of the Board of Mediation and Conciliation under the Newlands Act in 1913, by appointment of President Woodrow Wilson.

He was a member of several societies, including the American Academy of Political and Social Science, the American Economic Association, American Political Science Association, and the National Geographical Society.

== Sources ==
Legal offices
Preceded by Seat established by 36 Stat. 539	Judge of the United States Commerce Court; 1910–1913	Succeeded by Seat abolished
Preceded by Seat established by 36 Stat. 539	Judge of the United States Circuit Courts for the Second Circuit; 1910–1911	Succeeded by Seat abolished
Preceded by Seat established by 36 Stat. 539	Judge of the United States Court of Appeals for the Second Circuit; 1910–1916	Succeeded by Seat abolished
Preceded by Seat established by 36 Stat. 539	Judge of the United States Court of Appeals for the Fourth Circuit; 1916–1923	Succeeded by Seat abolished
