= List of United States Supreme Court cases, volume 208 =

Supreme Court of the United States
- Interactive map of Supreme Court of the United States
- 38°53′26″N 77°00′16″W
- Established: March 4, 1789; 236 years ago
- Location: Washington, D.C.
- Coordinates: 38°53′26″N 77°00′16″W
- Composition method: Presidential nomination with Senate confirmation
- Authorised by: Constitution of the United States, Art. III, § 1
- Judge term length: life tenure, subject to impeachment and removal
- Number of positions: 9 (by statute)
- Website: supremecourt.gov

This is a list of cases reported in volume 208 of United States Reports, decided by the Supreme Court of the United States in 1908.

== Justices of the Supreme Court at the time of volume 208 U.S. ==
The Supreme Court is established by Article III, Section 1 of the Constitution of the United States, which says: "The judicial Power of the United States, shall be vested in one supreme Court . . .". The size of the Court is not specified; the Constitution leaves it to Congress to set the number of justices. Under the Judiciary Act of 1789 Congress originally fixed the number of justices at six (one chief justice and five associate justices). Since 1789 Congress has varied the size of the Court from six to seven, nine, ten, and back to nine justices (always including one chief justice).

When the cases in volume 208 were decided the Court comprised the following nine members:

Portrait	Justice	Office	Home State	Succeeded	Date confirmed by the Senate (Vote)	Tenure on Supreme Court
	Melville Fuller	Chief Justice	Illinois	Morrison Waite	July 20, 1888 (41–20)	October 8, 1888 – July 4, 1910 (Died)
	John Marshall Harlan	Associate Justice	Kentucky	David Davis	November 29, 1877 (Acclamation)	December 10, 1877 – October 14, 1911 (Died)
	David Josiah Brewer	Associate Justice	Kansas	Stanley Matthews	December 18, 1889 (53–11)	January 6, 1890 – March 28, 1910 (Died)
	Edward Douglass White	Associate Justice	Louisiana	Samuel Blatchford	February 19, 1894 (Acclamation)	March 12, 1894 – December 18, 1910 (Continued as chief justice)
	Rufus W. Peckham	Associate Justice	New York	Howell Edmunds Jackson	December 9, 1895 (Acclamation)	January 6, 1896 – October 24, 1909 (Died)
	Joseph McKenna	Associate Justice	California	Stephen Johnson Field	January 21, 1898 (Acclamation)	January 26, 1898 – January 5, 1925 (Retired)
	Oliver Wendell Holmes Jr.	Associate Justice	Massachusetts	Horace Gray	December 4, 1902 (Acclamation)	December 8, 1902 – January 12, 1932 (Retired)
	William R. Day	Associate Justice	Ohio	George Shiras Jr.	February 23, 1903 (Acclamation)	March 2, 1903 – November 13, 1922 (Retired)
	William Henry Moody	Associate Justice	Massachusetts	Henry Billings Brown	December 12, 1906 (Acclamation)	December 17, 1906 – November 20, 1910 (Retired)

== Notable Cases in 208 U.S. ==
=== Adair v. United States ===
Adair v. United States, 208 U.S. 161 (1908), was a United States labor law case in which the Supreme Court declared that bans on "yellow-dog" contracts (that forbade workers from joining labor unions) were unconstitutional. The decision reaffirmed the doctrine of freedom of contract which was first recognized by the Court in Allgeyer v. Louisiana (1897). For this reason, Adair is often seen as defining what has come to be known as the Lochner era, a period in American legal history in which the Supreme Court tended to invalidate legislation aimed at regulating business.

=== Loewe v. Lawlor ===
Loewe v. Lawlor, 208 U.S. 274 (1908), also called the Danbury Hatters' Case, is a Supreme Court case in United States labor law concerning the application of antitrust laws to labor unions. The Court's decision effectively outlawed the secondary boycott as a violation of the Sherman Antitrust Act, despite union arguments that their actions affected only intrastate commerce. It was also decided that individual unionists could be held personally liable for damages incurred by the activities of their union.

=== Muller v. Oregon ===
In Muller v. Oregon, 208 U.S. 412 (1908), the Supreme Court upheld the general police powers of a state to protect the welfare of women even when it infringed on her fundamental right to negotiate contracts. Inequality, the Court said, was not a deciding factor because the sexes were inherently different in their particular conditions and had completely different functions; labor laws that were made to nurture women's welfare and for the "benefit of all" people were held not to be a violation of the Constitution's Contract Clause.

== Citation style ==
Under the Judiciary Act of 1789 the federal court structure at the time comprised District Courts, which had general trial jurisdiction; Circuit Courts, which had mixed trial and appellate (from the US District Courts) jurisdiction; and the United States Supreme Court, which had appellate jurisdiction over the federal District and Circuit courts—and for certain issues over state courts. The Supreme Court also had limited original jurisdiction (i.e., in which cases could be filed directly with the Supreme Court without first having been heard by a lower federal or state court). There were one or more federal District Courts and/or Circuit Courts in each state, territory, or other geographical region.

The Judiciary Act of 1891 created the United States Courts of Appeals and reassigned the jurisdiction of most routine appeals from the district and circuit courts to these appellate courts. The Act created nine new courts that were originally known as the "United States Circuit Courts of Appeals." The new courts had jurisdiction over most appeals of lower court decisions. The Supreme Court could review either legal issues that a court of appeals certified or decisions of court of appeals by writ of certiorari.

Bluebook citation style is used for case names, citations, and jurisdictions.

- "# Cir." = United States Court of Appeals
  - e.g., "3d Cir." = United States Court of Appeals for the Third Circuit
- "C.C.D." = United States Circuit Court for the District of . . .
  - e.g.,"C.C.D.N.J." = United States Circuit Court for the District of New Jersey
- "D." = United States District Court for the District of . . .
  - e.g.,"D. Mass." = United States District Court for the District of Massachusetts
- "E." = Eastern; "M." = Middle; "N." = Northern; "S." = Southern; "W." = Western
  - e.g.,"C.C.S.D.N.Y." = United States Circuit Court for the Southern District of New York
  - e.g.,"M.D. Ala." = United States District Court for the Middle District of Alabama
- "Ct. Cl." = United States Court of Claims
- The abbreviation of a state's name alone indicates the highest appellate court in that state's judiciary at the time.
  - e.g.,"Pa." = Supreme Court of Pennsylvania
  - e.g.,"Me." = Supreme Judicial Court of Maine

== List of cases in volume 208 U.S. ==
Case Name	Page and year	Opinion of the Court	Concurring opinion(s)	Dissenting opinion(s)	Lower Court	Disposition
Carrington v. United States	1 (1908)	Holmes	none	none	Phil.	reversed
Chin Yow v. United States	8 (1908)	Holmes	none	none	N.D. Cal.	reversed
New York ex rel. E. and J. Burke, Ltd. v. Wells	14 (1908)	Day	none	none	N.Y. Sup. Ct.	affirmed
Yosemite Gold Mining and Milling Company v. Emerson	25 (1908)	Day	none	none	Cal.	affirmed
United States v. Miller	32 (1908)	Day	none	none	Ct. Cl.	affirmed
Wabash Railroad Co. v. Adelbert College of Western Reserve University I	38 (1908)	Moody	none	none	Ohio	reversed
Winslow v. Baltimore and Ohio Railroad Company	59 (1908)	Moody	none	none	D.C. Cir.	affirmed
Bluthenthal v. Jones	64 (1908)	Moody	none	none	Fla.	affirmed
Prosser v. Finn	67 (1908)	Harlan	none	none	Wash.	affirmed
Blacklock v. United States	75 (1908)	Harlan	none	none	Ct. Cl.	affirmed
In re Metropolitan Railway Receivership	90 (1908)	Peckham	none	none	2d Cir.	mandamus denied
I.M. Darnell and Son Company v. City of Memphis	113 (1908)	White	none	none	Tenn.	reversed
Southern Pine Lumber Company v. Ward	126 (1908)	White	none	none	Sup. Ct. Terr. Okla.	affirmed
Ex parte Simon	144 (1908)	Holmes	none	none	C.C.D. (unspecified)	habeas corpus denied
Houghton v. Meyer	149 (1908)	Day	none	none	D.C. Cir.	affirmed
Adair v. United States	161 (1908)	Harlan	none	McKenna; Holmes	E.D. Ky.	reversed
Braxton County v. West Virginia ex rel. Tax Commissioners	192 (1908)	Brewer	none	none	W. Va.	dismissed
United States v. Graf Distilling Company	198 (1908)	Peckham	none	none	8th Cir.	certification
Penn Refining Company, Ltd. v. Western New York and Pennsylvania Railroad Company	208 (1908)	Peckham	none	Moody	3d Cir.	affirmed
Elder v. Wood	226 (1908)	Moody	none	none	Colo.	affirmed
Missouri Valley Land Company v. Wiese	234 (1908)	White	none	none	Neb.	affirmed
Missouri Valley Land Company v. Wrich	250 (1908)	White	none	none	Neb.	affirmed
Minneapolis, St. Paul and Sault Ste. Marie Railroad Company v. Doughty	251 (1908)	McKenna	none	none	N.D.	affirmed
United Dictionary Company v. G. and C. Merriam Company	260 (1908)	Holmes	none	none	7th Cir.	affirmed
Donnell v. Herring Hall Marvin Safe Company	267 (1908)	Holmes	none	none	7th Cir.	reversed
Loewe v. Lawlor	274 (1908)	Fuller	none	none	2d Cir.	reversed
Lewis v. Herrera	309 (1908)	Fuller	none	none	Ariz.	affirmed
Cleveland Terminal and Valley Railroad Company v. Cleveland Steamship Company	316 (1908)	Fuller	none	none	N.D. Ohio	affirmed
The Troy	321 (1908)	Fuller	none	none	W.D. Wis.	affirmed
Armstrong v. Fernandez	324 (1908)	Fuller	none	none	D.P.R.	affirmed
United States v. Larkin	333 (1908)	Fuller	none	none	N.D. Ohio	dismissed
Dick v. United States	340 (1908)	Harlan	none	none	D. Idaho	affirmed
Atlantic Trust Company v. Chapman	360 (1908)	Harlan	none	none	9th Cir.	reversed
Cosmopolitan Club v. Virginia	378 (1908)	Harlan	none	none	Va.	affirmed
Bassing v. Cady	386 (1908)	Harlan	none	none	R.I. Super. Ct.	affirmed
United States v. Bitty	393 (1908)	Harlan	none	none	C.C.S.D.N.Y.	reversed
Henningsen v. United States Fidelity and Guaranty Company of Baltimore	404 (1908)	Brewer	none	none	9th Cir.	affirmed
Muller v. Oregon	412 (1908)	Brewer	none	none	Or.	affirmed
Bien v. Robinson	423 (1908)	White	none	none	C.C.S.D.N.Y.	dismissed
Notley v. Brown	429 (1908)	White	none	none	Sup. Ct. Terr. Haw.	dismissed
Calvo v. De Gutierrez	443 (1908)	White	none	none	Phil.	affirmed
Great Northern Railroad Company v. United States	452 (1908)	White	none	none	8th Cir.	affirmed
Phillips v. Mobile	472 (1908)	Peckham	none	none	Ala.	affirmed
Richard v. Mobile	480 (1908)	Peckham	none	none	C.C.S.D. Ala.	affirmed
Ughbanks v. Armstrong	481 (1908)	Peckham	none	none	Mich.	affirmed
Jetton v. University of the South	489 (1908)	Peckham	none	none	C.C.M.D. Tenn.	reversed
Bennett v. Bennett	505 (1908)	McKenna	none	none	Sup. Ct. Terr. Okla.	affirmed
Crary v. Dye	515 (1908)	McKenna	none	none	Sup. Ct. Terr. N.M.	affirmed
Starr v. Campbell	527 (1908)	McKenna	none	none	C.C.W.D. Wis.	affirmed
Drumm Flato Commission Company v. Edmisson	534 (1908)	McKenna	none	none	Sup. Ct. Terr. Okla.	affirmed
Rankin v. City National Bank	541 (1908)	Holmes	none	none	8th Cir.	affirmed
First National Bank v. Albright	548 (1908)	Holmes	none	none	Sup. Ct. Terr. N.M.	affirmed
Herring Hall Marvin Safe Company v. Hall's Safe Company	554 (1908)	Holmes	none	none	6th Cir.	affirmed
United States v. Sisseton and Wahpeton Bands	561 (1908)	Holmes	none	none	Ct. Cl.	affirmed
Disconto GmbH v. Umbreit	570 (1908)	Day	none	none	Wis. Cir. Ct.	affirmed
Northern Pacific Railroad Company v. Minnesota ex rel. City of Duluth	583 (1908)	Day	none	none	Minn.	affirmed
Hairston v. Danville and Western Railroad Company	598 (1908)	Moody	none	none	Va.	affirmed
Wabash Railroad Co. v. Adelbert College of Western Reserve University II	609 (1908)	Moody	none	none	Ohio	rehearing denied

== See also ==
- Certificate of division
