= Great Railroad Strike of 1922 =

1922 nationwide railroad workers' strike in the US

- Workers leave their railroad duties to strike
- Date: July 1, 1922 – September 1922
- Location: Nationwide
- Caused by: A cut in wages paid to maintenance workers
- Methods: Railway shopmen walked off the job on July 1, 1922 launching a nationwide railway strike.

Parties
Railroad Workers	Railroad Owners; United States Government

Number
400,000	

Casualties
- Deaths: 10

The Great Railroad Strike of 1922, or the Railway Shopmen's Strike, was a nationwide strike of railroad workers in the United States. Launched on July 1, 1922, by seven of the sixteen extant railroad labor organizations, the strike continued into August before collapsing. A sweeping judicial injunction by Judge James Herbert Wilkerson effectively ended the strike on September 1, 1922.

At least ten strikers or family members were killed during the work stoppage. The collective action of some 400,000 workers in the summer of 1922 was the largest railroad strike since the American Railway Union's Pullman Strike of 1894 and the biggest American strike of any kind since the Great Steel Strike of 1919.

The strikes were seen as a major failure for the Harding Administration; the administration's handling of the strikers led by Attorney General Harry Daugherty, were criticized for their heavy handed tactics, and the inability to resolve the dispute damaged their credibility further. The Republicans would suffer major losses in the 1922 United States elections as a consequence of the strike.

== Background ==
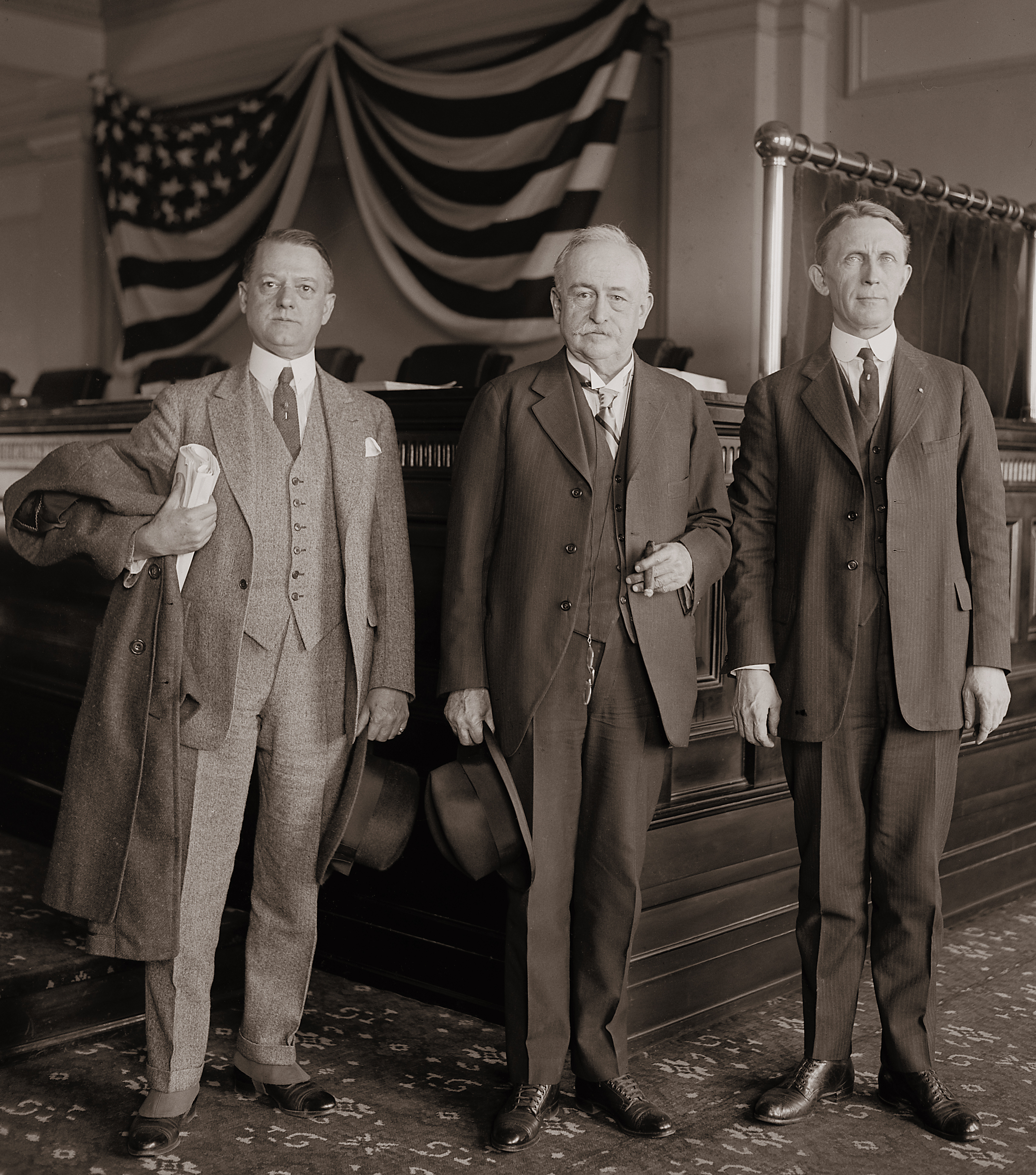
G.W.W. Hanger, R.M. Barton, and Chairman Ben W. Hooper of the Railroad Labor Board, which approved the wage cut for train maintenance workers that prompted the 1922 Railroad Shopmen's Strike.

During American participation in World War I, the American railroad system, the primary mode of freight and passenger transportation in the era, was nationalized by an executive order by President Woodrow Wilson. Operation of the railways was turned over to an institution known as the United States Railroad Administration. A period of relative labor harmony followed, marked by the establishment of the 8-hour day across the railroad industry.

This interval of labor peace proved short-lived, however, following the return of control of the rail system to private hands by the Transportation Act of 1920. A new bureaucratic entity for coordination of the industry was created at this time, a 9-member panel known as the Railroad Labor Board. This body was given the power to oversee the wages and working conditions of more than 2 million American railway workers.

The war years had been a period of dramatic inflation across the American economy. Price levels began to turn in the other direction in the first years of the 1920s as increased wartime demands upon production were regularized and labor supply was expanded with the reintegration of millions of former soldiers into the employment market. In response to the changing economic conditions, railway companies obtained approval from the Railroad Labor Board in 1921 for deep reductions in wage rates for workers across the industry.

Additionally, the railway industry was affected by the open shop movement, which was fostered by large employers throughout the American economy, with an increasing percentage of shop work contracted out by the railway companies to non-union subcontractors. During the war, the various railway shop crafts (machinists, boilermakers, blacksmiths, electricians, sheet-metal workers, and laborers) had fully obtained the right to unionize, and they sought to maintain this economic clout. Deep tension developed between employers and railway workers across the country. Attempts by the National Civic Federation in December 1921 to arrive at an amicable remedy to the conflict were unsuccessful.

== Launch of strike ==
In 1922 the Railroad Labor Board approved yet another cut in wages, this time a cut of 7 cents an hour targeted at railway repair and maintenance workers, representing a loss of an average of 12% for these workers. The overall economy had subsequently improved from its condition in the previous year, however, and railway workers were particularly aggrieved by the new round of wage reductions.

The targeted 1922 cut did not affect the members of the "Big Four" railway brotherhoods, however, and these unions were not affected as were the shop workers. Promises were made by the Railroad Labor Board to the so-called "Big Four" (the Brotherhood of Locomotive Engineers, Brotherhood of Locomotive Firemen and Enginemen, the Order of Railway Conductors, and the Brotherhood of Railroad Trainmen) that no additional wage cuts would be forthcoming. Several others of the 16 American railway unions in existence at the time similarly escaped the latest round of wage reductions.

Strike ballots were sent out to the members of all railway unions over the 1922 wage cuts, but when the votes were counted the members of the "Big Four" brotherhoods broke ranks over the question of a work stoppage. Seven unions representing the railroad shopmen and maintenance of way workers voted to go on strike, however, and the date July 1, 1922, was set for the launch of a coordinated work stoppage. On that day some 400,000 railway workers walked off the job, including nearly 100,000 in the Chicago metropolitan area alone.

== Company counteroffensive ==
Office for the recruiting of strikebreakers in the 1922 Shopmen's Strike. Strikebreakers were frequently housed and fed on-site to avoid having to cross picket lines, leading to promises of "Free Board – Room" in the painted window.

With the conductors, engineers, firemen, and brakemen who actually operated the trains unaffected by the strike, the railroad companies immediately began to replace the skilled and semi-skilled maintenance workers with strikebreakers. In unison, railroads began to establish living facilities for the strikebreakers inside their railway shops and in railroad cars and railroad guards were hired to protect property and defend strikebreakers. Commissaries and kitchens were established to provide for newly-hired workers, and newspaper advertising was published by a number of railway companies in an attempt to win public support for their strikebreaking efforts.

Railway workers were divided not only by craft, however, but also by race. Several of the railway brotherhoods denied African-American workers membership in their ranks on strictly racial grounds; the excluded workers had no economic or moral incentive to honor the work stoppage. Thousands of black railway workers crossed picket lines and helped to undermine strike efforts, but that was not universal; in places like North Carolina, Louisiana, and El Paso, Texas, black workers actively supported the work stoppage.

The railroads took advantage of the strike to undermine the bargaining position of the workers in their maintenance facilities. On July 3, head of the Railroad Labor Board Ben W. Hooper, a former Republican governor of Tennessee and political appointee of conservative President Warren G. Harding, pushed through a so-called "outlaw resolution" that declared that all strikers had forfeited their arbitration rights guaranteed under the Transportation Act of 1920. Railroads were encouraged by the Railway Labor Board to hire replacement workers, who were to be regarded as permanent by the board.

In the Eastern United States, a number of railroads attempted to bring pressure to end the strike by stripping strikers of seniority rights. Seniority was important to railroad shop workers in the process of promotion to skilled status as positions became available and in the avoidance of layoffs during slack times, with employees with the least seniority laid off first. The strategy of stripping strikers of their seniority spread rapidly across the country and the issue of retaining seniority, and its associated benefits thereafter became one of the paramount issues of the strike.

== Conflict and violence ==
One of the tens of thousands of private guards hired by railroad companies to protect company assets and guard strikebreakers during the 1922 Railway Shopmen's Strike.

Bitter labor discord followed. In some towns, local merchants and authorities gave moral and actual help to the strikers, including refusal to sell groceries to strikebreakers and other commercial boycotts and the extension of free goods and discounts to strikers. Picnics were held in support of strikers and in some places, railway guards were disarmed by local sheriffs who were seeking to avert the chance of violence.

Women came to the aid of striking men by both provisioning those who walked picket lines and walking the lines themselves. Women were also instrumental in some places in pressuring strikers to appear on the picket line and in dissuading strikebreakers from continuing to cross strike lines. In Easton, Pennsylvania, for example, a crowd of 50 women and children pelted strikebreakers with sour milk, rotten eggs, and spoiled produce.

Attempts by state and federal authorities to impose order proved to be an accelerant to the physical nature of the conflict. In the initial phase of the conflict, strikers attempted to set up pickets to close down railroad roundhouses and repair shops. Private guards and law enforcement authorities were quick to remove strikers from private property, however, and with the strikebreakers frequently domiciled on the job site, new and more-violent tactics were used, including the issuance of physical threats, the vandalism of strikebreakers' homes, the destruction of railroad property, and instances of physical violence against strikebreakers.

For their part, armed company guards fired upon striking workers with a number of deaths resulting, including incidents in Cleveland, Ohio (July 8 and July 16), Buffalo, New York (July 8), Clinton, Illinois, (a worker's teenaged son, July 8; the worker was wounded), Port Morris, New Jersey (July 12), and in Needles, California (July 12). In Wilmington, North Carolina, a company guard took exception to being called a "scab" by a non-striking railroad engineer and shot him dead. In Buffalo, a woman and two boys were shot by railroad detectives; the boys suffered mortal injuries according to contemporary newspaper accounts. In addition, at least one company guard was shot and killed following the stopping of a train at Superior, Wisconsin, on August 12.

Some strikers did not hesitate to sabotage trains and tracks when the opportunity arose. In one case a train was switched onto side tracks and the cars set upon by a mob, with rocks and metal parts thrown through glass windows. Sections of track were occasionally disrupted with explosives. Vigilante violence was particularly acute in the South and Southwest, with kidnappings and floggings of strikebreakers common. Union leaders condemned the spontaneous violence of strikers and the sometimes-brutal response of company guards and police officials but with little practical effect.

== Termination of strike ==
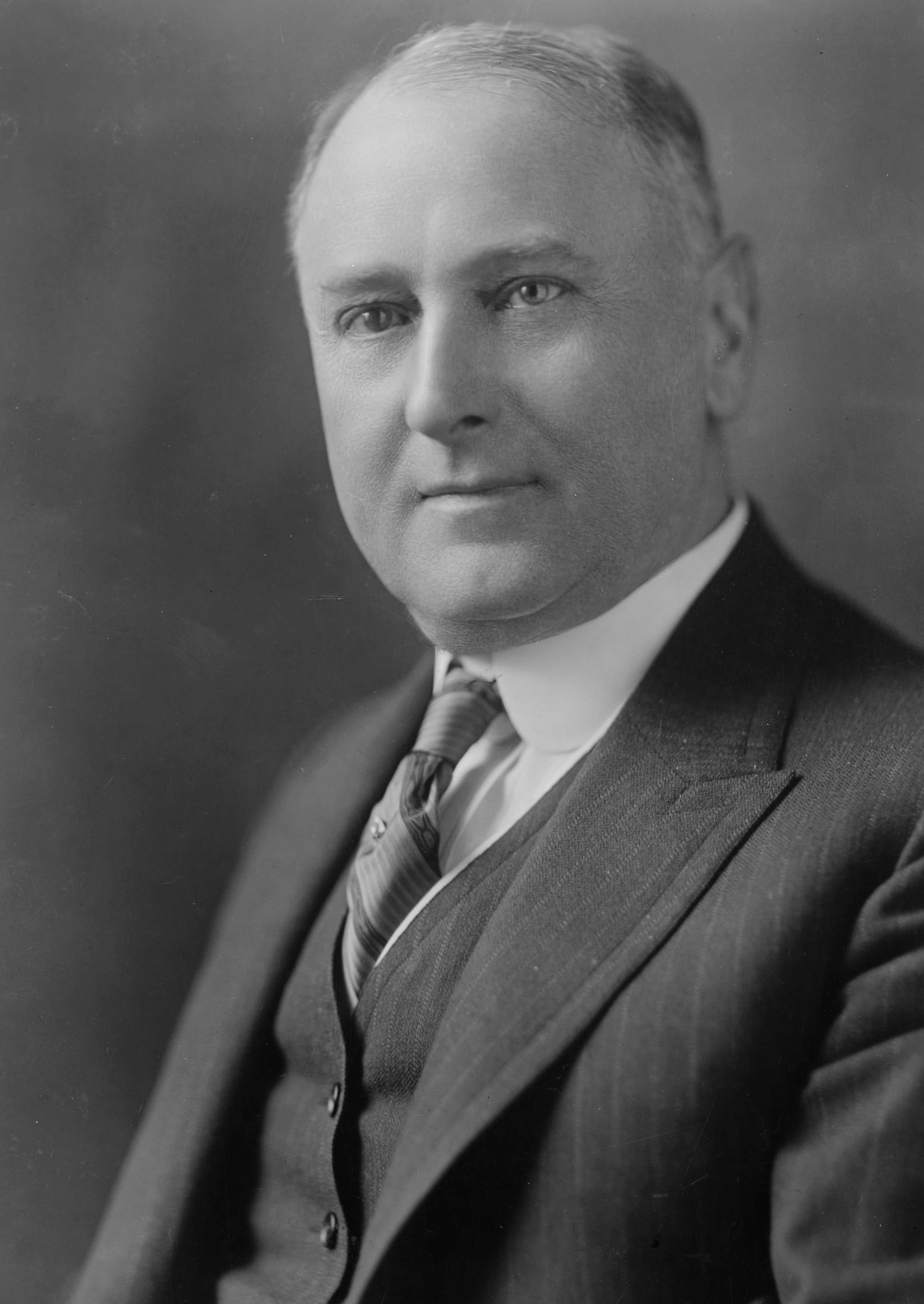
Attorney General Harry M. Daugherty sought an aggressive approach to end the 1922 Railroad Strike and made use of legal injunctions and US Marshals on the railway companies' behalf.

The opportunity for a mediated solution to the strike was brief. On July 11, 1922, President Harding issued a proclamation that attempted to split the difference between the two sides in the conflict, recognizing the merit of the workers' grievances and promising not to destroy organized labor but also recognizing the decision of the Railroad Labor Board that strikebreakers were to be regarded as permanent employees, with "the same indisputable right to work as others have to decline work."

The Railroad Labor Board attempted to mediate an end to the dispute, bringing together union and railroad representatives on July 14 in a joint conference. While the railroad officials pledged to end the subcontracting of work to non-union shops, no retreat was to be made on the issue of restoring seniority to striking workers, and the impasse remained unsettled. Following the failure of this conference, the Railroad Labor Board declared that its efforts to resolve the stoppage had reached an end.

While the US Army was not used to defend railroad company interests in the 1922 Shopmen's Strike, the US National Guard was called out, on a state-by-state basis, by various state governors. Troops bolstered armed company guards in their work protecting railroad property and aiding in the defense and transportation of strikebreakers, thereby working to undermine the strike effort.

US Attorney General Harry M. Daugherty, an outspoken opponent of the labor movement, was instrumental in escalating the federal government's role in bringing about the defeat of the striking railway workers. Daugherty sensationally charged strikers with conducting "a conspiracy worthy of Lenin and Zinoviev" and sent US Marshals into the field to aid the railroads in their efforts to defend their property and defeat the strike. Deputy US Marshals were appointed freely, sometimes from pools of "thugs" that had been gathered by the railways themselves.

Opposing Daugherty in the inner circle of the Harding administration were Secretary of Commerce Herbert Hoover and Secretary of Labor James John Davis, who sought a negotiated end to the strike. Harding was won over to that approach and professed the belief that the role of the federal government in the dispute should be one of an "honest broker" rather than as a violent authority figure.

Harding proposed a settlement on July 28 that would have granted little to the labor unions, but the railroad companies still rejected the compromise, despite interest from the desperate workers. Daugherty, who opposed the unions, pushed for national action against the strike, and on September 1, Judge James Herbert Wilkerson issued a sweeping injunction against striking, assembling, picketing, and a variety of other union activities; it was colloquially known as the "Daugherty Injunction": "One of the most extreme pronouncements in American history violating any number of constitutional guarantees of free speech and free assembly. (But) it effectively broke the strike".

There was widespread opposition to the injunction, and a number of sympathy strikes shut down some railroads completely, but the strike eventually died out, as many shopmen made deals with the railroads on the local level. The often-unpalatable concessions, coupled with memories of the violence and tension during the strike, soured relations between the railroads and the shopmen for quite some time. The outcome of the strike was a major blow to the Harding administration who were criticized for their inability to resolve the situation and would be a major factor to the Republicans losing the 1922 midterms along with Harding's controversial veto of the Bonus Bill.

== See also ==
- List of US strikes by size
- 1922 UMW General coal strike
- 1922 New England textile strike
- Great Railroad Strike of 1877
- Railroad strike of 1946
- History of rail transport in the United States
- List of American railway unions
- Timeline of United States railway history
