= 2022 United States railroad labor dispute =

- Date: 2019 – December 2022
- Location: United States
- Caused by: Precision railroading
- Goals: Improved working conditions
- Methods: Collective bargaining

Parties
12 labor unions: TCU, BRC, IAM, ATDA, SMART-MD, SMART-TD, IBEW, IBB, NCFO, BRS, BLET, BMWE	BNSF Railway, CSX, Norfolk Southern Railway, Union Pacific, Kansas City Southern, Canadian National

The 2022 United States railroad labor dispute was a labor dispute between freight railroads and workers in the United States. Rail companies and unions had tentatively agreed to a deal in September 2022, but it was rejected by a majority of the unions' rank-and-file members. Congress and President Joe Biden intervened to pass the tentative agreement into law on December 2, averting a strike.

The new contract contains an immediate 14% wage increase and 24% salary increase over five years, plus one day of paid leave per year.

The companies and unions had been negotiating since 2019 and began mediation in June 2021. Biden convened a Presidential Emergency Board in July 2022, which issued recommendations and a 30-day cooling off period that expired on September 16, 2022. There were significant concerns that a freight rail strike would further exacerbate ongoing supply chain issues.

== Background ==
The rise of precision scheduled railroading has resulted in resource and staffing cuts; to compensate railroad companies have enacted strict attendance policies for employees. These policies eliminate any free time which workers have, requiring them to be effectively on-call for weeks at a time. Workers have complained of increased levels of stress and fatigue.

Rail companies and unions representing workers have been negotiating since 2019 when the contracts were up for amendment.

In January 2022, BNSF Railway implemented a points attendance system named "Hi Viz" that a union president called, "the worst and most egregious attendance policy ever adopted by any rail carrier." In the system, each worker starts with 30 points and loses points for taking a day off. Workers can accrue 4 points by being on-call for 14 straight days, but any time off, even for illness or a family emergency, resets the clock. Unions representing about 17,000 workers threatened to strike over the points system, but BNSF Railway sued and won a restraining order to prevent the unions from striking.

The Railway Labor Act grants Congress the authority to intervene in any railway or airline strike. Under this authority, the National Mediation Board has mediated negotiations between multiple freight railroads and unions starting in June 2021.

Ten of the twelve unions involved negotiated together under the Coordinated Bargaining Coalition, while the Brotherhood of Maintenance of Way Employes (BMWE) and the International Association of Sheet Metal, Air, Rail and Transportation Workers – Mechanical Division (SMART-MD) bargained together. Although BMWE is part of the International Brotherhood of Teamsters, along with the Brotherhood of Locomotive Engineers and Trainmen (BLET), they negotiated separately. Similarly, SMART-MD and SMART-TD, the union's transportation division, negotiated separately.

Of the railways involved in the dispute, six bargained together, forming the National Carriers Conference Committee. These six were Union Pacific, Norfolk Southern, CSX, BNSF, Kansas City Southern, and Canadian National. Amtrak and Canadian Pacific bargained separately.

== Presidential Emergency Board ==
In July 2022, a Presidential Emergency Board was convened under the Railway Labor Act by President Joe Biden. His Executive order stated, "I have been notified by the National Mediation Board that in its judgment these disputes threaten substantially to interrupt interstate commerce to a degree that would deprive a section of the country of essential transportation service."

The board issued a report on August 16, starting a 30-day cooling off period that prevents any strikes or lockouts. Reuters reported that the board proposed "annual wage increases of between 4% and 7% through 2024" in addition to retroactive pay increases, one extra paid day off and five $1,000 annual bonuses.

By the end of August, three unions representing about 15,000 workers agreed to the recommendations made by the board.

On September 14, near the end of the cooling off period, Secretary of Labor Marty Walsh hosted negotiations at the Department of Labor between the railroad companies, and unions in an attempt to prevent a strike. The Washington Post reported that Biden was "personally involved in the talks", wanting workers to have more flexibility in scheduling.

Early on September 15, Biden announced a deal had been reached to prevent a strike, including an immediate 14% wage increase, but only one day of paid leave per year rather than the 15 days of paid sick leave unions wanted. The deal still needed to be ratified by rank-and-file members of the unions, however, no strike could take place for several weeks regardless of the outcomes of ratification votes.

== Congressional intervention ==
In September 2022, U.S. Senators Richard Burr and Roger Wicker introduced a bill that would have required labor unions to agree to the terms proposed by the Presidential Emergency Board, to prevent a strike. It was blocked by Senator Bernie Sanders, who noted that freight rail workers receive a "grand total of zero sick days" while railroad companies made significant profits. In the House of Representatives, Speaker Nancy Pelosi said, "We’d rather see negotiations prevail so there's no need for any actions from Congress."

In late November, after some unions had rejected the agreement, Biden asked Congress to pass the agreement into law. On November 30, the House of Representatives passed the existing tentative agreement along with an amended version that would require railroad employers to ensure 7 days paid sick leave. On December 1, the Senate passed the tentative agreement with only 1 day of sick leave. President Joe Biden signed the legislation into law on December 2.

Writing for Jacobin, Barry Eidlin, associate professor of sociology at McGill University, said the message sent to the rail workers by the president and Congress was "shut up and get back to work." The Biden administration's intervention in the dispute was condemned by over 500 labor historians in an open letter to Joe Biden and Secretary of Labor Marty Walsh.

== Impact on transit ==
Amtrak announced the preemptive cancellation of several services in anticipation of the strike, including all long-distance services on September 15. The Northeast Corridor would not be impacted by any strike or lockout, as it is not owned or dispatched by freight railroads. Following Biden's announcement that a deal had been reached, Amtrak announced it was resuming normal service.

== Followup agreements ==
In February 2023, CSX announced a deal to provide four days of paid sick leave annually, plus the option of converting three personal days into additional paid sick time with two unions.

== See also ==
- 1992 United States railroad strike
- Norris–La Guardia Act
- Pullman Strike
