= Railway Labor Act =

US labor legislation

- Long title: An Act to provide for the prompt settlement of disputes growing out of grievances or out of interpretation or application of agreements covering rates of pay, rules, or working conditions, between carriers and their employees, and for other purposes
- Enacted by: the 69th United States Congress

Citations
- Public law: Pub. L. 69–257
- Statutes at Large: 44 Stat. 577

Codification
- Acts amended: Transportation Act of 1920
- Acts repealed: Title III of the Transportation Act of 1920
- Titles amended: 45

Legislative history
- Introduced in the House as H.R. 9463 by Samuel E. Winslow; Committee consideration by House Interstate and Foreign Commerce; Passed the House on; Passed the Senate on; Signed into law by President Calvin Coolidge on May 20, 1926

The Railway Labor Act is a United States federal law that governs labor relations in the railroad and airline industries. The Act, enacted in 1926 and amended in 1934 and 1936, seeks to substitute bargaining, arbitration, and mediation for strikes to resolve labor disputes. Its provisions were originally enforced under the Board of Mediation, but they were later enforced under a National Mediation Board.

== Earlier laws ==
In 1877, protests broke out in Martinsburg, West Virginia when the Baltimore and Ohio Railroad (B&O) cut worker pay for the third time in a year. West Virginia Governor Henry M. Mathews sent militia under Colonel Charles J. Faulkner to restore order but was unsuccessful largely because of militia sympathies with the workers. The governor reluctantly called for federal assistance, which restored peace to Martinsburg but proved to be controversial, with many newspapers critical of the governor's characterization of the strikes as an "insurrection", rather than an act of desperation. One notable paper recorded a striking worker's perspective that he "had might as well die by the bullet as to starve to death by inches." A day after federal troops had restored order in Martinsburg, similar protests erupted in Maryland and spread to New York, Pennsylvania, Illinois, and Missouri. The strikes, which lasted six weeks, would come to be known as the Great Railroad Strike of 1877.

Congress later passed the Arbitration Act of 1888, which authorized the creation of arbitration panels with the power to investigate the causes of labor disputes and to issue non-binding arbitration awards. The Act was a complete failure since only one panel was ever convened under the Act: in the case of the 1894 Pullman Strike, it issued its report only after the strike had been ended by a federal court injunction, backed by federal troops.

Congress attempted to correct the shortcomings in the Erdman Act, enacted in 1898. The Erdman Act likewise provided for voluntary arbitration but made any award issued by the panel binding and enforceable in federal court. It also outlawed discrimination against employees for union activities, prohibited "yellow dog contracts" (in which an employee agreed not to join a union during employment), and required both sides to maintain the status quo during any arbitration proceedings and for three months after an award was issued. The arbitration procedures were rarely used. A successor statute, the Newlands Labor Act of 1913, which created the Board of Mediation, proved to be more effective. It was largely superseded when the federal government nationalized the railroads in 1917, after the US entered World War I. (See United States Railroad Administration.)

The Adamson Act, enacted in 1916, provided workers with an eight-hour day at the same daily wage they had received previously for a ten-hour day, and it required time-and-a-half pay for overtime work. Another law enacted that year, amid increasing concerns about the war in Europe, gave US President Woodrow Wilson the power to "take possession of and assume control of any system of transportation" for transportation of troops and war material.

Wilson exercised that authority on December 26, 1917. While Congress considered nationalizing the railroads on a permanent basis after the war, the Wilson administration announced that it was returning the railroad system to its owners. However, Congress tried to preserve, the most successful features of the federal wartime administration, which were the adjustment boards, by creating a Railroad Labor Board (RLB) with the power to issue nonbinding proposals for the resolution of labor disputes, as part of the Esch–Cummins Act (Transportation Act of 1920).

The RLB soon destroyed whatever moral authority its decisions might have had in a series of decisions. In 1921, it ordered a twelve percent reduction in employees' wages, which the railroads were quick to implement. The following year, when shop employees of the railroads launched a national strike, the RLB issued a declaration that purported to outlaw the strike, and the US Department of Justice obtained an injunction that carried out that declaration. From then on, railway unions refused to have anything to do with the RLB.

== Passage and amendment ==
The RLA was the product of negotiations between the major railroad companies and the unions that represented their employees. Like its predecessors, it relied on boards of adjustment, established by the parties, to resolve labor disputes, with a government-appointed Board of Mediation to attempt to resolve those disputes that board of adjustment could not. The RLA promoted voluntary arbitration as the best method for resolving those disputes that the Board of Mediation could not settle.

Congress strengthened the procedures in the 1934 amendments to the Act, which created a procedure for resolving whether a union had the support of the majority of employees in a particular "craft or class", while turning the Board of Mediation into a permanent agency, the National Mediation Board (NMB), with broader powers.

Congress extended the RLA to cover airline employees in 1936.

== Bargaining and strikes ==
Unlike the National Labor Relations Act (NLRA), which adopts a less interventionist approach to the way the parties conduct collective bargaining or resolve their disputes arising under collective bargaining agreements, the RLA specifies both (1) the negotiation and mediation procedures that unions and employers must exhaust before they may change the status quo and (2) the methods for resolving "minor" disputes over the interpretation or application of collective bargaining agreements.

The RLA permits strikes over major disputes only after the union has exhausted the RLA's negotiation and mediation procedures and bars almost all strikes over minor disputes. The RLA also authorizes the courts to enjoin strikes if the union has not exhausted those procedures.

On the other hand, the RLA imposes fewer restrictions on the tactics that unions may use when they do have the right to strike. The RLA, unlike the NLRA, allows secondary boycotts against other RLA-regulated carriers and permits employees to engage in other types of strikes, such as intermittent strikes, that might be unprotected under the NLRA.

=== "Major" and "minor" disputes ===
The RLA categorizes all labor disputes as either "major" disputes, which concern the making or modification of the collective bargaining agreement between the parties, or "minor" disputes, which involve the interpretation or application of collective bargaining agreements. Unions can strike over major disputes only after they have exhausted the RLA's "almost interminable" negotiation and mediation procedures. They cannot, on the other hand, strike over minor disputes, either during the arbitration procedures or after an award is issued.

The federal courts have the power to enjoin a strike over a major dispute if the union has not exhausted the RLA's negotiation and mediation procedures. The Norris–LaGuardia Act dictates the procedures that the court must follow. Once the NMB releases the parties from mediation, however, they retain the power to engage in strikes or lockouts, even if they subsequently resume negotiations or the NMB offers mediation again.

The federal courts likewise have the power to enjoin a union from striking over arbitrable disputes, that is minor disputes. The court may, on the other hand, also require the employer to restore the status quo as a condition of any injunctive relief against a strike.

Major dispute bargaining is handled through the "Section 6" process, named for the section of the Act that describes the bargaining process. The railroad carriers have formed a coalition for national handling of Railway Labor Act bargaining under Section 6, named the National Carriers Conference Committee (NCCC). The railroad unions also form coalitions of various unions to increase bargaining power in the Section 6 process.

=== Discipline and replacement of strikers ===
Carriers may lawfully replace strikers engaged in a lawful strike but may not, however, discharge them except for misconduct or eliminate their jobs to retaliate against them for striking. It is not clear whether the employer can discharge workers for striking before all of the RLA's bargaining and mediation processes have been exhausted.

The employer must also allow strikers to replace replacements hired on a temporary basis and permanent replacements who have not completed the training required before they can become active employees. The employer may, on the other hand, allow less senior employees who crossed the picket line to keep the jobs they were given after crossing the line, even if the seniority rules in effect before the strike would have required the employer to reassign their jobs to returning strikers.

== Representation elections ==
The NMB has the responsibility for conducting elections when a union claims to represent a carrier's employees. The NMB defines the craft or class of employees eligible to vote, which almost always extends to all of the employees performing a particular job function throughout the company's operations, rather than just those at a particular site or in a particular region.

A union seeking to represent an unorganized group of employees must produce signed and dated authorization cards or other proof of support from at least 50% of the craft or class. A party attempting to oust an incumbent union must produce evidence of support from a majority of the craft or class and then the NMB must conduct an election. If the employees are unrepresented and the employer agrees, the NMB may certify the union based on the authorization cards alone.

The NMB usually uses mail ballots to conduct elections, unlike the National Labor Relations Board (NLRB), which has historically preferred walk-in elections under the NLRA. The NMB can order a rerun election if it determines that either an employer or union has interfered with employees' free choice.

== Protecting employees' rights ==
Unlike the NLRA, which gives the NLRB nearly exclusive power to enforce the Act, the RLA allows employees to sue in federal court to challenge an employer's violation of the Act. The courts can grant employees reinstatement and backpay, along with other forms of equitable relief.

== Constitutionality ==
At least one court has ruled that imposition of railroad contract terms does not violate the Constitution's prohibition in Article I, Section 9 against bills of attainder, because they are not a punishment for specific people.

== See also ==
- US labor law
- History of rail transport in the United States
- Category:Rail transportation labor disputes in the United States
