= Brian Clauss =

American lawyer

Brian Clauss is a scholar on the legal issues of military veterans. He is an author, lecturer and commentator on labor and employment issues of the National Guard and Reserve component members. Clauss is the former Director of the Veterans Legal Support Center and Clinic at the John Marshall Law School in Chicago, Illinois.

Clauss also works in the field of alternative dispute resolution and been an instructor for the National Mediation Board, the American Arbitration Association and other groups.

Clauss is a graduate of Lake Forest College and the John Marshall Law School. He was an Assistant States Attorney in Cook County from 1990 to 2004.
