= Loren Sweatt =

American government official

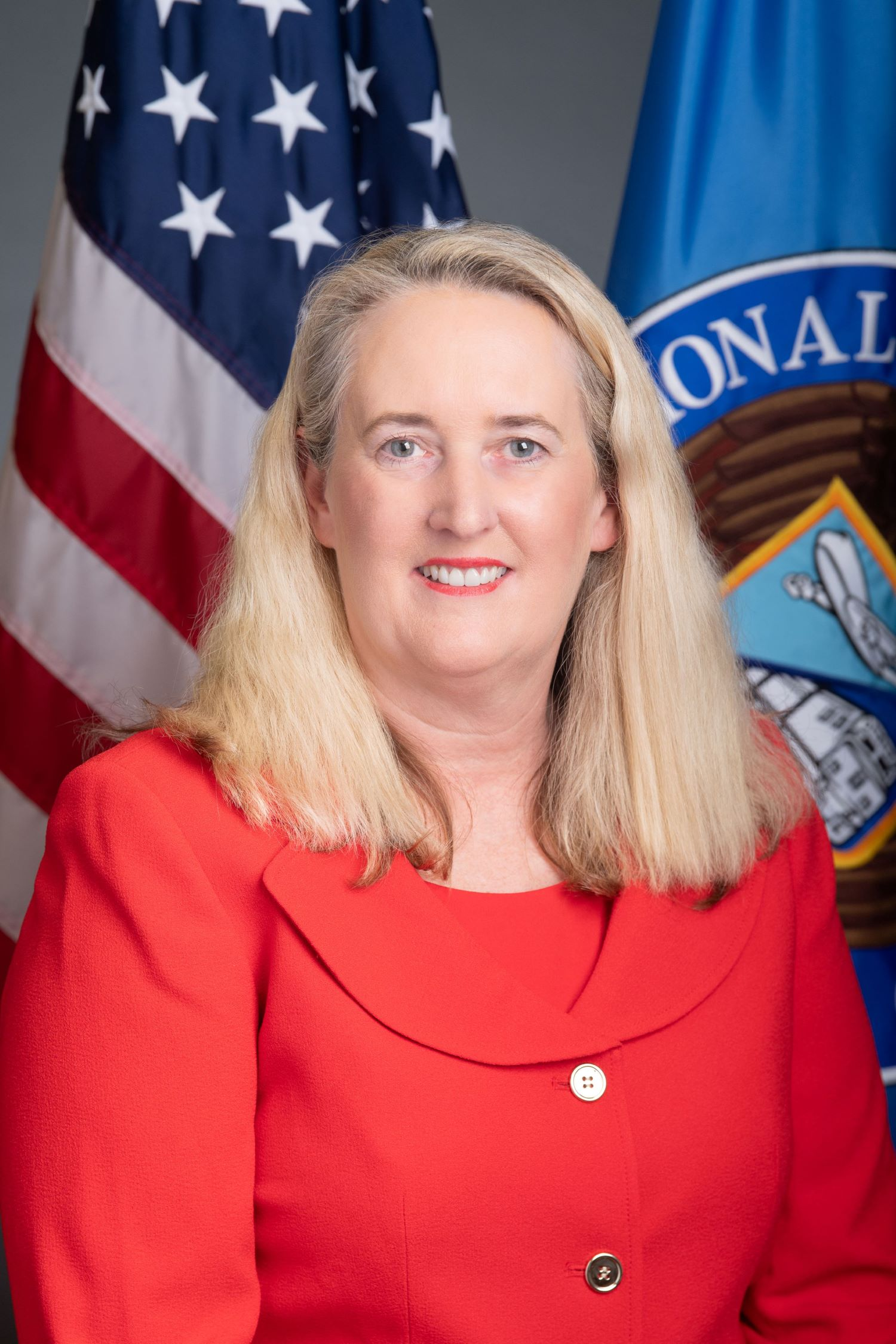

Member of the National Mediation Board
- In office April 2, 2024 – July 1, 2026
- Preceded by: Gerald W. Fauth III

Acting Assistant Secretary of Labor for Occupational Safety and Health
- In office August 2017 – March 2019
- Preceded by: Jordan Barab

Personal details
- Party: Republican
- Education: Texas Christian University (BA); Marymount University (MBA)

Loren E. Sweatt is an American government official who has served as a member of the National Mediation Board (NMB) since 2024. She previously served as Principal Deputy Assistant Secretary of Labor for Occupational Safety and Health (OSHA) from 2017 to 2021, including a period as acting head of the agency.

== Career ==
=== House education and the workforce committee ===
Sweatt spent 15 years as a Senior Policy Advisor at the United States House Committee on Education and the Workforce, where she worked on workplace safety issues involving OSHA and the Mine Safety and Health Administration. Before joining the committee, she worked as a lobbyist for the Associated General Contractors of America.

=== OSHA (2017–2021) ===
Sweatt joined OSHA on July 24, 2017, as Deputy Assistant Secretary of Labor for Occupational Safety and Health, becoming the first OSHA appointee of the Trump administration. She filled the role previously held by Jordan Barab under President Barack Obama.

Because no Assistant Secretary of Labor for Occupational Safety and Health was nominated or confirmed during the Trump administration, Sweatt became the agency's highest-ranking official. She served as acting head of OSHA from August 2017 to March 2019. She later held the title of Principal Deputy Assistant Secretary until stepping down before President Joe Biden's inauguration on January 20, 2021.

=== Senate HELP Committee (2021–2024) ===
In March 2021, Sweatt joined the staff of the United States Senate Committee on Health, Education, Labor, and Pensions (HELP Committee), where she served as a Senior Professional Staff Member.

=== National Mediation Board (2024–present) ===
President Biden nominated Sweatt on March 20, 2023, to fill a Republican seat on the National Mediation Board, succeeding Gerald W. Fauth III.

The HELP Committee reported her nomination favorably by a vote of 21–0. The full Senate confirmed her by voice vote on March 7, 2024. She was sworn in and assumed her position on April 2, 2024.

== Education ==
Sweatt holds a Bachelor of Arts from Texas Christian University and a Master of Business Administration from Marymount University.
