= 1992 United States railroad strike =

Labor strike in the United States in 1992

- Date: June 24–26, 1992 (2 days)
- Location: United States

Parties
International Association of Machinists and Aerospace Workers	CSX Transportation

The 1992 United States railroad strike was a strike by railroad employees between June 24 and June 26, 1992. The strike was launched by the International Association of Machinists, a union representing employees of CSX Transportation. Due to the interconnectedness of the United States railroad system, the strike caused railroads across the country to shut down their operations.

The impact of the strike and subsequent shutdown was so severe that the federal government swiftly intervened to end it. The House and Senate passed the Railway Strike bill (H.J.Res. 517) on June 26 banning both strikes and lockouts, which was then signed by President George H. W. Bush the same day.

== Background ==
In June 1992, tensions were high between railroads and organized labor. A number of unions threatened to launch a strike if their demands were not met by the end of the day on Tuesday the 23rd. However, most unions agreed to extend their deadline amid negotiations with railroads such as Amtrak and Conrail.

Early newspapers on the morning of Wednesday the 24th ran headlines reporting a potential strike by Amtrak employees had been averted. President Bush warned ahead of a potential strike that because of the potential for extreme disruption to the nation's economy, "it ought to end the day it begins".

== The strike ==
The strike began just after midnight on Wednesday June 24. It was launched by the International Association of Machinists among members who worked for CSX Transportation. The union defied the extension of the strike deadline, and no other unions joined in the strike as a result.

Even though the strike was confined to just one railroad, 40 railroads in the United States all responded by halting their operations, which unions said was an attempt by the railroad industry to force government intervention in the strike by instituting a lockout.

As a result of the strike, virtually all freight railroad transport ceased at once. Passenger service along freight lines was also suspended. The only trains that continued operating were passenger trains on lines owned by Amtrak or other passenger railroads. Service along the Northeast Corridor was largely unaffected by the strike, as Amtrak owned the railroad line in question.

The Bush administration asserted that the strike and its effects cost the nation $1 billion per day as a result of lost wages and industries that relied on rail transport being forced to shut down.

== Government intervention ==
Congress reacted rapidly to the strike and subsequent industry lockout. In what the Los Angeles Times described as "with rare speed", the House and Senate both passed the Railway Strike bill in the evening of Thursday June 25 which contained a ban on both strikes by railroad workers and lockouts by railroads against their employees. The bill was passed shortly before three Amtrak unions had threatened to begin a strike, with a deadline of 12:01 AM Friday morning set for a walkout to begin. President Bush signed it into law shortly after it cleared both chambers of Congress.

The law created by congress required mandatory arbitration in disputes between railroads and their employees.

== Reactions ==
A number of members of Congress criticized the bill as being unfriendly to workers. Representative Pat Williams of Montana described the bill as "a fundamental mistake that will haunt railroad workers for decades". In the Senate, Howard Metzenbaum reacted to the bill by saying, "Workers are getting the short end of the stick".

Other members of Congress asserted that the magnitude of the railroad shutdown demanded immediate action, including those traditionally perceived as being pro-labor. Defenders of the bill included senator Ted Kennedy and representative Al Swift. The latter defended the bill, saying "It's a new idea and it treats organized labor better than anything Congress has ever done before."

Alexander Cockburn harshly criticized the government response in an op-ed, asserting that "capital has gone on strike" and comparing it to Italian Fascism.

== See also ==
- Railway Labor Act
- 2022 United States railroad labor dispute
