= William Lea Chambers =

American judge

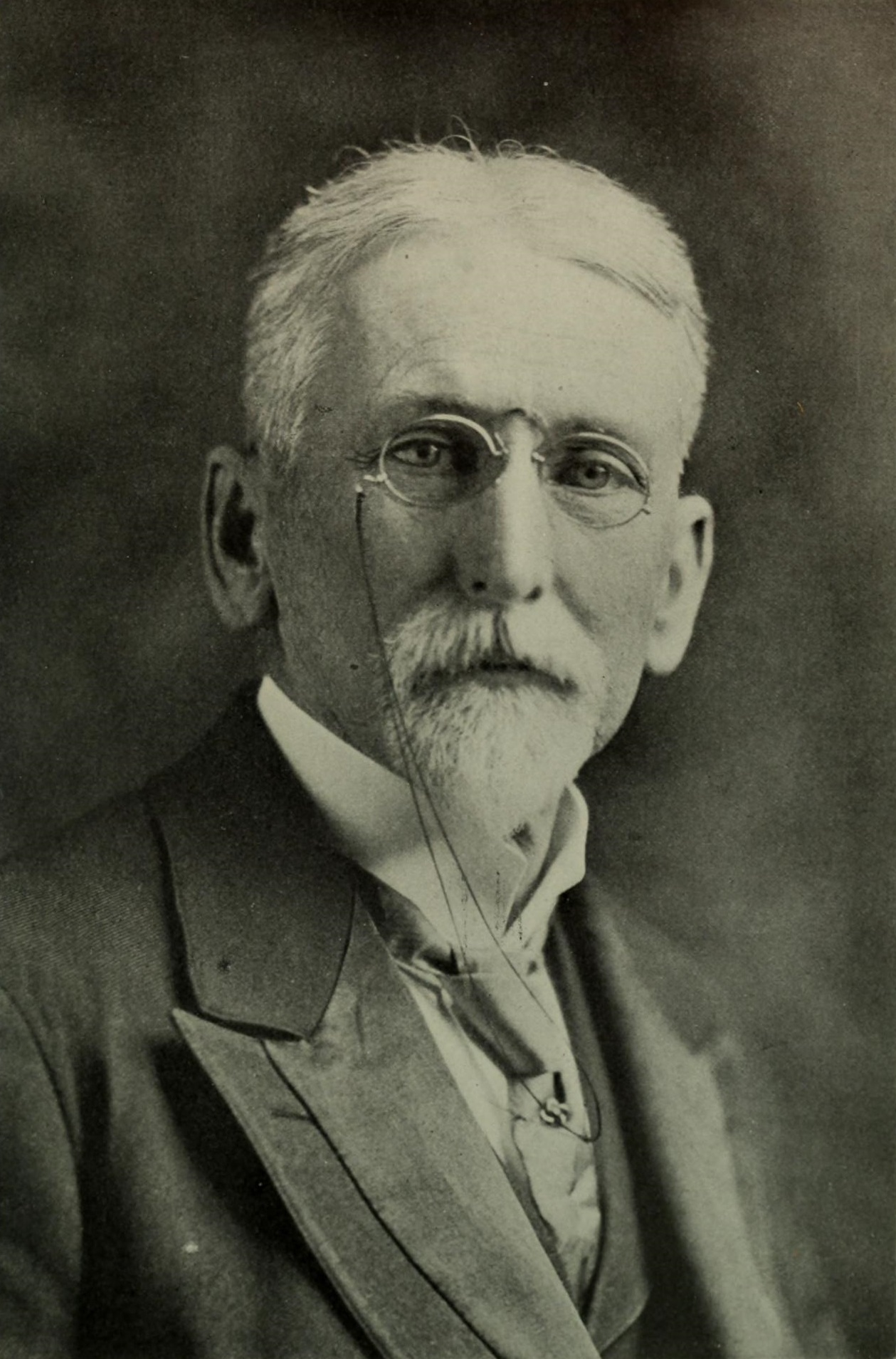
Portrait of William Lea Chambers, by Harris & Ewing.

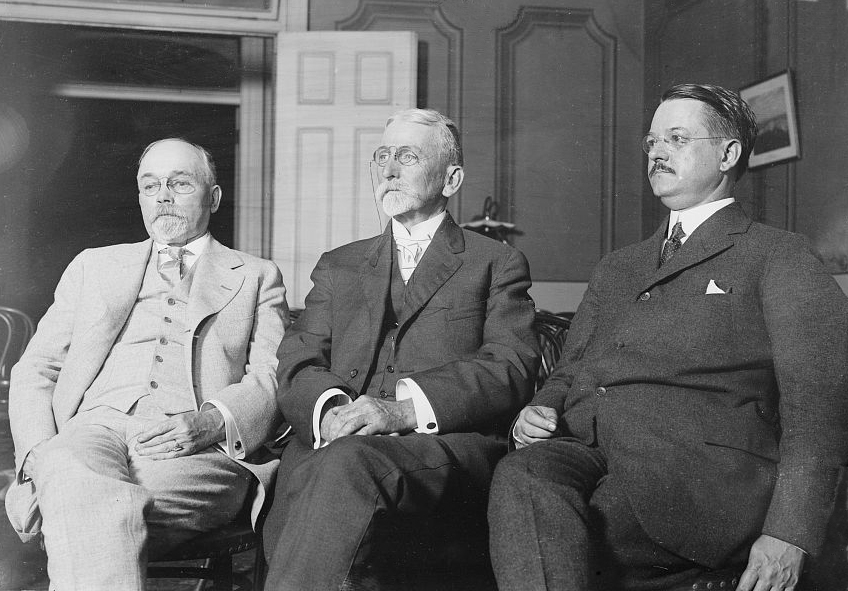
Martin Augustine Knapp, William Lea Chambers and George Wallace William Hanger in 1913

William Lea Chambers (4 March 1852 – 26 August 1933) was a United States federal judge.

== Biography ==
He was born on March 4, 1852, in Columbus, Georgia.

He was appointed Chief Justice of Samoa c.1897, where the English, Germans and Americans were sharing political influence under a tripartite agreement. He was soon forced to adjudicate between rival local claimants to the kingship of Samoa, ruling on a legal technicality in favour of Chief Tanu. A civil war ensued, which had to put down by British naval intervention, severely worsening relations between England and Germany, who had favoured the other claimant. Chambers was eventually pressured into resigning his post c.1900.

In March 1913, he was appointed Commissioner of the United States Board of Mediation and Conciliation.

== Death and family ==
He died in 1933 and was buried in Monocacy Cemetery, Beallsville, Maryland. He had married Laura Ligon Clopton and had several children.

== Publications ==
- Board of Arbitration in the Controversy Between the Eastern Railroads and the Brotherhood of Locomotive Firemen and Enginemen (1913)
