= Gerald Fauth =

American consultant and government official

Gerald W. Fauth III
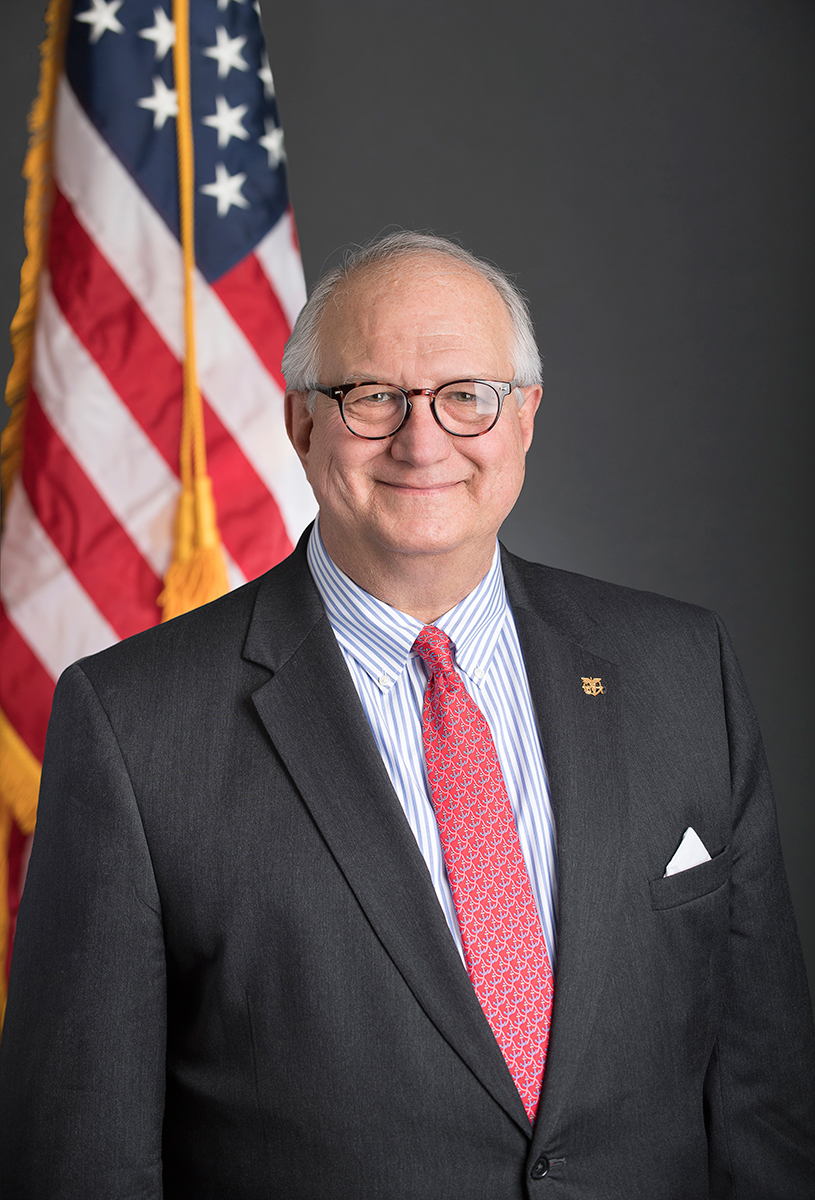
- Official portrait, 2017

Member of the National Mediation Board
- In office November 9, 2017 – April 2, 2024
- President: Donald Trump; Joe Biden
- Preceded by: Harry R. Hoglander
- Succeeded by: Loren Sweatt

Chairman of the National Mediation Board
- In office July 1, 2021 – June 30, 2022
- President: Joe Biden
- Preceded by: Kyle Fortson
- Succeeded by: Linda Puchala
- In office November 9, 2017 – June 30, 2018
- President: Donald Trump
- Preceded by: Harry R. Hoglander
- Succeeded by: Kyle Fortson

Personal details
- Political party: Republican
- Relations: Richard Burr (brother-in-law)
- Education: Hampden–Sydney College (BA)

Gerald Fauth is an American businessperson who served on the National Mediation Board (NMB). Fauth was first appointed to the NMB by President Donald Trump in 2017 and served as its Chairman from November 2017 to June 2018 and again from July 2021 to June 2022. Prior to joining the NMB, he was the president of G.W. Fauth & Associates Inc., a transportation economic consulting firm.

Fauth has been criticized over his decision to dump stocks in February 2020, one week prior to the coronavirus market crash. Fauth dumped the stocks immediately after receiving a phone call from his brother-in-law, Senator Richard Burr, who was privy to material nonpublic information about the impact of COVID-19.

== Education ==
Fauth attended St. Stephen's School for Boys in Alexandria, Virginia, until 1974. In 1978 he earned a Bachelor of Arts in history in government from Hampden-Sydney College.

== Career ==
After graduating from Hampden-Sydney College, Fauth joined G.W. Fauth & Associates (GWF), which was founded by his father in 1957, in a full-time capacity. He worked at the company until November 1, 1999, when he accepted a position with the U.S. Surface Transportation Board (STB). At STB, Fauth was chief of staff for Vice Chairman Wayne O. Burkes. When Burkes ran for a political office, Fauth returned to GWF in June 2003. During his time at the Surface Transportation Board, several rail companies merged, and Fauth was responsible for the resolution of ensuing labor disputes and the harmonizing of bargaining agreements.

From 1999 to 2003, he worked at the Surface Transportation Board as chief of staff and senior advisor.

Fauth is a member of the Transportation Research Forum and the Association of Transportation Law Professionals.

In May 2020, ProPublica reported that Fauth had sold tens of thousands of dollars in stock prior to the 2020 stock market crash, on the same day that his brother-in-law Richard Burr also sold a large number of his shares. Burr, who chaired the Senate Intelligence Committee, is under federal investigation due to suspicions of insider trading. According to the Securities and Exchange Commission, Burr had a 50 second phone conversation with Fauth in February 2020 – immediately afterwards, Fauth called his broker.
