= Adair v. United States =

- Supreme Court of the United States

Argued October 29, 1907 Decided January 27, 1908
- Full case name: William Adair, Plff. in Err. v. United States
- Citations: 208 U.S. 161 (more) 28 S. Ct. 277; 52 L. Ed. 436; 1908 U.S. LEXIS 1431

Case history
- Prior: Error to the District Court of the United States for the Eastern District of Kentucky

Holding
- Section 10 of the Erdman Act which prohibited railroad companies from demanding that a worker not join a union as a condition for employment was unconstitutional because it infringed on the right to liberty of contract under the Fifth Amendment and exceeded Congress' powers under the Commerce Clause.

Court membership
- Chief Justice Melville Fuller Associate Justices John M. Harlan · David J. Brewer; Edward D. White · Rufus W. Peckham; Joseph McKenna · Oliver W. Holmes Jr. William R. Day · William H. Moody

Case opinions
- Majority: Harlan, joined by Fuller, Brewer, White, Peckham, Day
- Dissent: McKenna
- Dissent: Holmes
- Moody took no part in the consideration or decision of the case.

Laws applied
- U.S. Const. amend. V U.S. Const. art. I sec. 8 clause 3
- Superseded by
- Lauf v. E. G. Shinner & Co. (1938)
- Abrogated by
- Norris–La Guardia Act of 1932

Adair v. United States, 208 U.S. 161 (1908), was a US labor law case of the United States Supreme Court which declared that bans on "yellow-dog" contracts (that forbade workers from joining labor unions) were unconstitutional. The decision reaffirmed the doctrine of freedom of contract which was first recognized by the Court in Allgeyer v. Louisiana (1897). For this reason, Adair is often seen as defining what has come to be known as the Lochner era, a period in American legal history in which the Supreme Court tended to invalidate legislation aimed at regulating business.

In earlier cases, the Court had struck down state legislation limiting the freedom of contract by using the due process clause of the Fourteenth Amendment, which only applied to the states. In Adair the doctrine was expanded to include federal legislation by way of the due process clause of the Fifth Amendment.

== Facts ==
The Erdman Act of 1898, section 10, passed by Congress to prevent unrest in the railroad labor industry, prohibited railroad companies engaged in interstate commerce from demanding that a worker not join a union as a condition for employment. The law provided for voluntary arbitration of disputes between the interstate railroads and their workers organized into labor unions. It applied to individuals who worked on moving trains which transported freight and passengers between states. Workers who maintained railroad cars, and station clerks, did not come under the statute's jurisdiction. In 1906, William Adair, a master mechanic who supervised employees at the Louisville & Nashville Railroad, fired O. B. Coppage for belonging to labor union called the Order of Locomotive Fireman. Adair's actions were in direct violation of Section 10 of the Erdman Act which made it illegal for employers to "threaten any employee with loss of employment" or to "unjustly discriminate against an employee because of his membership in ... a labor corporation, organization or association." Adair was indicted in the United States District Court for the Eastern District of Kentucky, which upheld the law as constitutional. In a subsequent trial, Adair was found guilty of violating the act and ordered to pay a $100 fine. Adair appealed the District Court's decision to the Supreme Court.

== Judgment ==
In a 6-2 decision, the Court held that Section 10 of the Erdman act was unconstitutional. In the majority opinion, written by Justice John M. Harlan, the question to be decided was described as such:

May Congress make it a criminal offense against the United States – as by the tenth section of the act of 1898 it does – for an agent or officer of an interstate carrier, having full authority in the premises from the carrier, to discharge an employee from service simply because of his membership in a labor organization?

In answering this question, Harlan first examined whether Section 10 of the act on which the indictment against Adair was based "is repugnant to the Fifth Amendment." Harlan found that the due process clause of the Amendment guarded against "an invasion of the personal liberty, as well as the right of property", and that "[s]uch liberty and right embraces the right to make contracts for the purchase of the labor of others and equally the right to make contracts for the sale of one's own labor". Harlan further cited the landmark decision in Lochner v. New York (1905) in which the Court had struck down state regulation which was found to infringe on the laborers' "liberty of contract". In reference to the prerogatives of both parties in the termination of a labor contract, Harlan wrote:

In all such particulars, the employer and the employee have equality of right, and any legislation that disturbs that equality is an arbitrary interference with the liberty of contract which no government can legally justify in a free land.

Having found that the Fifth Amendment barred against limiting the right of an employer to fire an employee due to membership in a labor union, Harlan concluded that Congress could not criminalize such action. Furthermore, it had been argued by the government in defending the statute that Section 10 was a valid exercise of Congress' powers under the Commerce Clause. In the second part of the opinion, Harlan examined this claim, at first acknowledging that Congress had "a large discretion in the selection or choice of the means to be employed in the regulation of interstate commerce". But this discretion was dependent on the regulation:

Manifestly, any rule prescribed for the conduct of interstate commerce, in order to be within the competency of Congress under its power to regulate commerce among the States, must have some real or substantial relation to or connection with the commerce regulated.

Harlan rejected that the provision had any such connection, asking rhetorically:

But what possible legal or logical connection is there between an employee's membership in a labor organization and the carrying on of interstate commerce? Such relation to a labor organization cannot have, in itself, and in the eye of the law, any bearing upon the commerce with which the employee is connected by his labor and services.

Harlan concluded that Congress' control over interstate commerce did not extend to membership in labor unions:

W]e hold that there is no such connection between interstate commerce and membership in a labor organization as to authorize Congress to make it a crime against the United States for an agent of an interstate carrier to discharge an employee because of such membership on his part.

Justices Joseph McKenna and Oliver W. Holmes, Jr. filed separate dissents.

=== McKenna's dissent ===
In his dissent, McKenna stressed the importance of the purpose of Congress' regulation, viz. its remedial efforts to counter the recurring clashes between workers and management in the railroad industry:

The provisions of the act are explicit, and present a well coordinated plan for the settlement of disputes between carriers and their employees by bringing the disputes to arbitration and accommodation, and thereby prevent strikes and the public disorder and derangement of business that may be consequent upon them. I submit no worthier purpose can engage legislative attention or be the object of legislative action (...)

By the same token, McKenna argued that the invalidation of Section 10 would hamper Congress' intentions, as a scheme devised for effective arbitration would thus come to lack an integral component. In reference to the right of an employer to fire an employee at will, which would unravel Congress' arbitration scheme, McKenna asked:

How can it be an aid, how can controversies which may seriously interrupt or threaten to interrupt the business of carriers (I paraphrase the words of the statute), be averted or composed if the carrier can bring on the conflict or prevent its amicable settlement by the exercise of mere whim and caprice?

In apparent admonition of the reasoning in the majority opinion, McKenna cautioned: "Liberty is an attractive theme, but the liberty which is exercised in sheer antipathy does not plead strongly for recognition." McKenna found that the legislation was within the boundaries of Congress' powers to regulate interstate commerce, and, in regard to the Fifth Amendment, a line was to be drawn between private and public business: "We are dealing with rights exercised in a quasi-public business, and therefore subject to control in the interest of the public."

=== Holmes' dissent ===
Holmes, in a succinct dissent, began by saying that he too thought that the act was constitutional, and that "but for the decision of my brethren, I should have felt pretty clear about it." In Holmes' view, Section 10 presented "in substance, a very limited interference with the liberty of contract, no more." Holmes also criticized past decisions of the Court in this regard, stating that "I confess that I think that the right to make contracts at will that has been derived from the word liberty in the amendments has been stretched to its extreme by the decisions". Like McKenna, Holmes contended that Congress' interest in preventing strikes and make effective its scheme of arbitration was sufficient justification for the act, while also adding, in conclusion:

But suppose the only effect really were to tend to bring about the complete unionizing of such railroad laborers as Congress can deal with, I think that object alone would justify the act. I quite agree that the question what and how much good labor unions do is one on which intelligent people may differ – I think that laboring men sometimes attribute to them advantages, as many attribute to combinations of capital disadvantages, that really are due to economic conditions of a far wider and deeper kind – but I could not pronounce it unwarranted if Congress should decide that to foster a strong union was for the best interest not only of the men, but of the railroads and the country at large.

== Significance ==
The Court followed up the decision in Adair with Coppage v. Kansas (1915), which denied to states as well the power to ban yellow-dog contracts. In 1932, yellow-dog contracts were outlawed in the United States under the Norris–LaGuardia Act.

David P. Currie has remarked that the Court's decision in Adair is difficult to square with two of its other decisions that same year: Damselle Howard v. Illinois Central Railroad Company (1907), in which the Court held that it was within Congress' power to abrogate the fellow-servant rule (which absolves an employer of liability for injury to a worker resulting from the negligence of a co-worker) for railway employees injured in interstate commerce; and Loewe v. Lawlor (1908), in which it held that Congress could prevent union members from boycotting goods shipped from one state to another.

== See also ==
- US labor law
- List of United States Supreme Court cases, volume 208
