= Deirdre Hamilton =

American lawyer

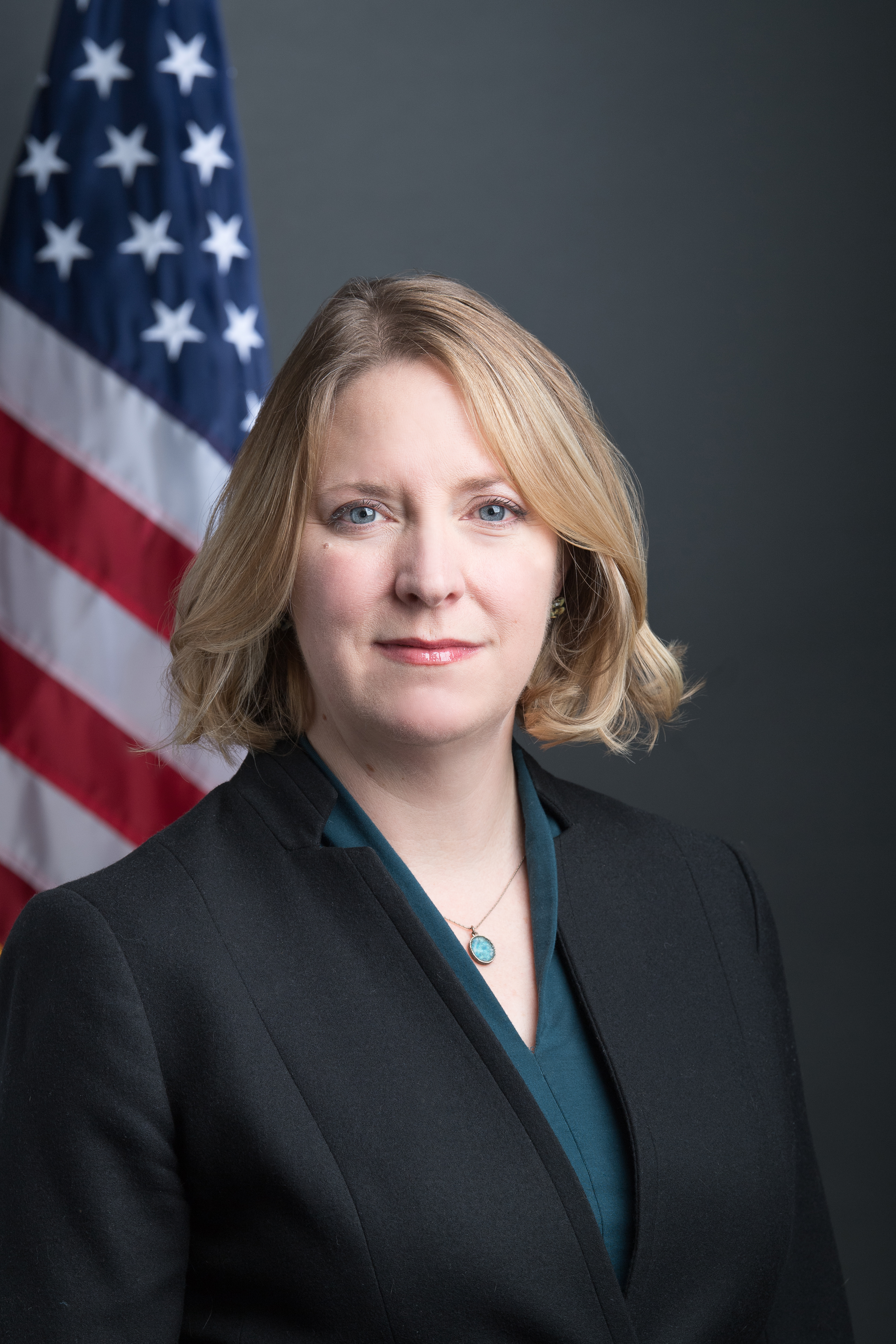

Member of the National Mediation Board
- In office January 25, 2022 – October 14, 2025
- Nominated by: Joe Biden
- Preceded by: Kyle Fortson

Personal details
- Education: Oberlin College (BA); University of Michigan (JD)

Deirdre Hamilton is an American labor lawyer who served as a member of the National Mediation Board from 2022 until her termination by President Donald Trump in 2025. She was previously a staff attorney for the Association of Flight Attendants.

== Education ==
Hamilton earned a Bachelor of Arts degree from Oberlin College and a Juris Doctor from the University of Michigan Law School.

== Career ==
After graduating from law school, Hamilton joined the legal department of the International Association of Machinists and Aerospace Workers. She joined the Association of Flight Attendants as a staff lawyer in 2002 and the airline division of the International Brotherhood of Teamsters in 2014.

Hamilton was sworn in as a member of the National Mediation Board on January 25, 2022.

Her term expired on June 30, 2025, but she continued serving under the board's statute, which provides that a member serve until a successor is nominated by the president and confirmed by the Senate.

=== Termination and litigation ===
On October 8, 2025, Hamilton received a one-sentence email from a White House personnel advisor informing her that her position on the board was terminated.

In February 2026, Hamilton filed suit in the U.S. District Court for the District of Columbia, arguing that the board's governing statute permitted removal of a member only “for inefficiency, neglect of duty, malfeasance in office, or ineligibility,” and that no successor had been nominated to replace her.

In June 2026, the Supreme Court ruled 6–3 in Trump v. Slaughter that statutory removal protections for members of independent agencies violated the separation of powers, overturning the Court's 1935 precedent in Humphrey's Executor v. United States. Following the decision, Hamilton dismissed her lawsuit, and a judge closed the case in July 2026.

In March 2026, she took a position as a lawyer at the Association of Flight Attendants, where she had previously worked.
