= Cleveland Terminal & Valley Railway Co. v. Cleveland Steamship Co. =

Cleveland Terminal and Valley Railway v. Cleveland Steamship Co.
- Supreme Court of the United States

Argued December 17–18, 1907 Decided February 24, 1908
- Full case name: Cleveland Terminal and Valley Railroad Company v. Cleveland Steamship Company
- Citations: 208 U.S. 316 (more) 28 S. Ct. 414; 52 L. Ed. 508

Case history
- Prior: On appeal from the District Court of the United States for the Northern District of Ohio, Eastern Division

Court membership
- Chief Justice Melville Fuller Associate Justices John M. Harlan · David J. Brewer; Edward D. White · Rufus W. Peckham; Joseph McKenna · Oliver W. Holmes Jr. William R. Day · William H. Moody

Case opinion
- Majority: Fuller, joined by a unanimous court

Cleveland Terminal and Valley Railway Co. v. Cleveland Steamship Co., 208 U.S. 316 (1908), is a decision by the United States Supreme Court which held that damages caused to a bridge pier, bridge protective pilings, and docks by a vessel on navigable waters was not a cause for action under United States maritime law. The ruling was legislatively overturned in 1948.

== Background ==
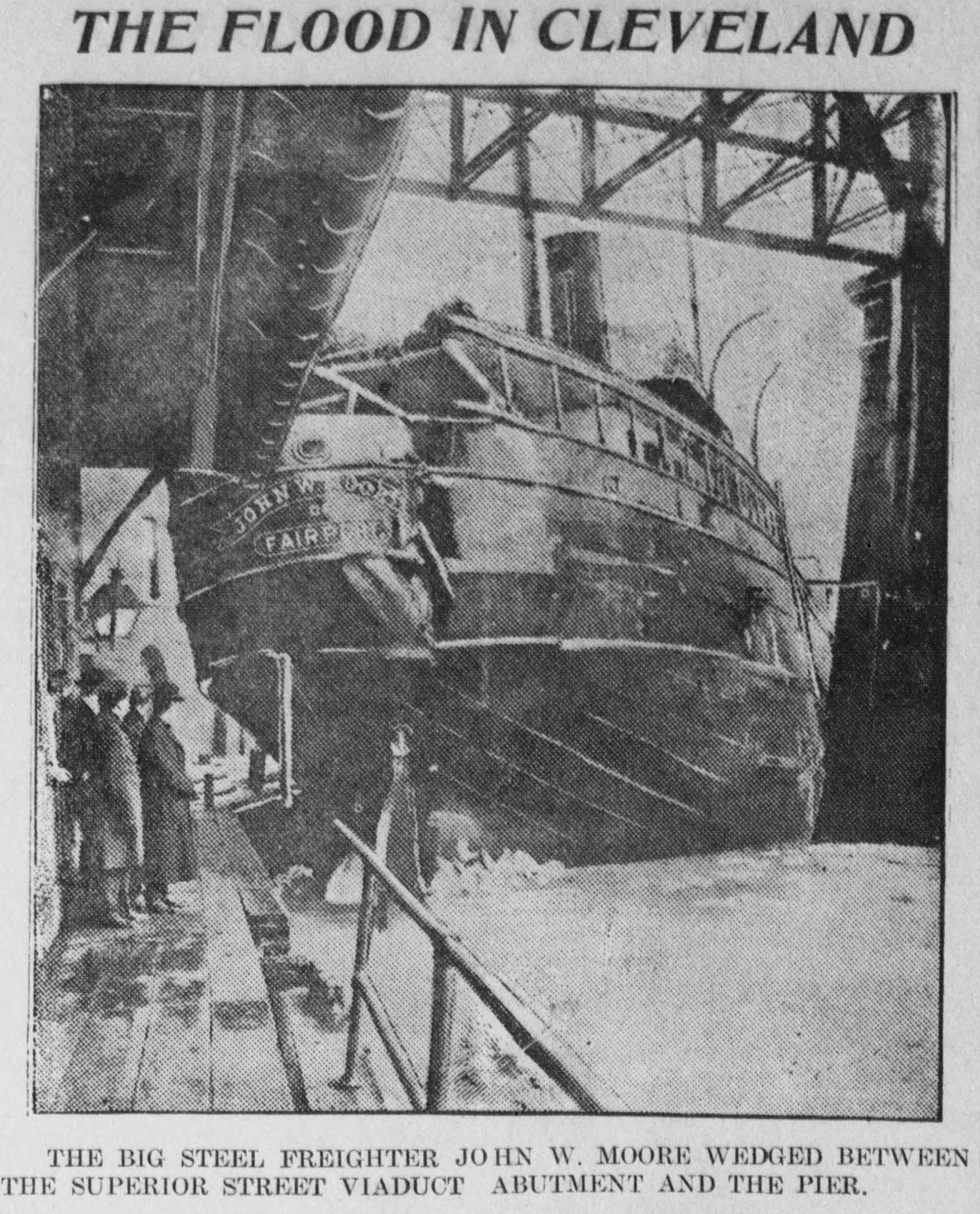
The Moore wedged between the riverside docks and the east pier of the viaduct.

The Cuyahoga River in the U.S. state of Ohio began to flood about January 21, 1904, after two days of continuous rain and a sudden spring thaw melted the area's snowpack and river ice. The 400-foot (120 m) unpowered ore barge William E. Reis was moored to some timber pilings located near Columbus Street in Cleveland, Ohio. The heavily laden Reis broke free and began floating downriver. She crashed into the 246-foot (75 m) steamboat John W. Moore and the 416-foot (127 m) steamboat James B. Eads, doing heavy damage to them and tearing both loose from their moorings. All three vessels continued to float stern-first down the swift, flood-swollen Cuyahoga, the unladen Eads and Moore proceeding downstream faster. The Cleveland, Terminal and Valley Railway (CT&V) owned a swing bridge over the Cuyahoga, located near the intersection of Riverbed and Sycamore Streets. The operators managed to open the swing in the hope that the vessels would pass by. The stern of the Eads struck the east pier of the Superior Viaduct (a bridge carrying Superior Avenue across the river), and her bow swung into the center of the river—striking the center pier of the CT&V swing bridge. The Moore, following the Eads, struck a dock co-owned by the CT&V and the Detroit & Cleveland Navigation Company and then jammed stern first into the space between the eastern pier of the Superior Viaduct and the bank of the river. The bow of the Moore then was forced by the floodwaters against the shore, crushing the dock. The Reis became wedged between the other two vessels.

The three vessels partially dammed the river. The river’s now constrained and redirected current undermined the ships and carved away a large portion of the riverbed, doing considerable damage to the piers of the CT&V swing bridge and the Superior Viaduct.

The owners of the vessels damaged by the Reis sued in rem to recover their costs. The Baltimore and Ohio Railroad, which owned a controlling interest in the CT&V, also sued to recover the cost of repairing the swing bridge pier and pilings and the dock. The United States District Court for the Northern District of Ohio, Eastern Division, sitting as a court of admiralty, found that the ship's owners had failed to properly staff the vessel during the flood, and that the lone shipkeeper aboard the Reis had failed to properly maintain the vessel's moorings during the flood. But United States maritime law, the district court said, did not permit the CT&V from recovering its costs. The dock, pier, and pilings were neither "an instrument of or an aid to navigation", it held, and thus no action was available to the railroad under maritime law.

The railroad appealed to the United States Court of Appeals for the Sixth Circuit, which upheld the district court.

The railway appealed to the U.S. Supreme Court.

== Ruling ==
Chief Justice Melville Fuller delivered the opinion of the unanimous court.

In The Plymouth (1866), 70 U.S. 20 (U.S. 1865)., aff'd. Ex Parte Phenix Ins. Co., 118 U.S. 610 (U.S. 1886)., the Supreme Court had held that a case for damages under maritime law could proceed only if "the substance and consummation" of the wrong had taken place on navigable waters. In each case, the fact that a fire began aboard a ship and spread to land did not bring the tort under admiralty law. In Johnson v. Chicago & Pac. Elev. Co., 119 U.S. 388 (U.S. 1886)., the Supreme Court held that there was no cause under maritime law in the case where a ship's jib struck a building on land. However, in The Blackheath, 195 U.S. 361 (U.S. 1904)., the Supreme Court had held that damage to a maritime navigation beacon permanently attached to the sea floor was properly brought under admiralty law. The Blackheath appeared to overrule the previous cases.

The Court held that The Blackheath had properly distinguished a purely maritime aid to navigation (like a beacon) attached to the bed beneath navigable waters from other structures. "[T]he bridges, shore docks, protection piling, piers, etc., pertained to the land. They were structures connected with the shore and immediately concerned commerce upon land. None of these structures were aids to navigation in the maritime sense, but extensions of the shore, and aids to commerce on land as such," Fuller wrote.

The judgement of the district court was affirmed.

== Subsequent developments ==
The "aids to navigation" rule outlined in Cleveland Terminal and Valley Railway was widely incorporated into American admiralty jurisprudence over the next 40 years. In The Troy, 208 U.S. 321 (U.S. 1908)., the Supreme Court dismissed per curiam a case where a vessel had struck a railroad bridge over the Mississippi River. The high court similarly dismissed per curiam a cause for action in The Phoenix Construction Co. v. Steamer Poughkeepsie, 212 U.S. 558 (U.S. 1908). (a vessel struck a pipe lying on the riverbed). In Martin v. West, 222 U.S. 191 (U.S. 1911)., the Supreme Court permitted a cause for damages to go forward because it was not filed as a maritime action. Cleveland Terminal and Valley Railway was explicitly upheld by the Court in The Raithmoor, 241 U.S. 166 (U.S. 1916).. There, the court held that a navigational beacon still under construction qualified as an "aid to navigation", and its incomplete nature (nor the temporary construction structures supporting that construction) did not remove it from admiralty jurisdiction.

The definition of "aid to navigation" began to become cloudy, however, after The Panoil, 266 U.S. 433 (U.S. 1925). In that case, a ship struck and damaged a levee that had been constructed on a riverbed. The levee was designed to aid navigation by gathering silt (which otherwise would spread into the ship channel), and was not connected to the shore. Nevertheless, the Supreme Court said, "We think the principle of those cases [Blackheath, Raithmoor] does not go so far. The dike constitutes an extension of the shore, and must be regarded as land." The court held no case could proceed under maritime law. The Supreme Court further muddied the waters with its ruling in Doullut and Williams Co. v. United States, 268 U.S. 33 (U.S. 1925). Various ships had damaged pilings driven into a riverbed and used for mooring. At trial, the parties agreed that the pilings were not an aid to navigation. Yet, the Supreme Court without explanation reversed this finding and permitted the cause for damages to go forward under admiralty law.

The Supreme Court's ruling in Cleveland Terminal and Valley Railway Co. v. Cleveland Steamship Co. stood until 1948. That year, Congress enacted the Extension of Admiralty Jurisdiction Act, which extended tort claims under U.S. maritime law to include cases caused by a vessel on navigable waters, whether or not the action occurred or was consummated on land.

== Bibliography ==
- Force, Robert; Yiannopoulos, A.N.; Davies, Martin (2006). Admiralty and Maritime Law. Washington, D.C.: Beard Books. ISBN 9781587982903.
- Robinson, Gustavus H. (April 1936). "Tort Jurisdiction in American Admiralty Law". University of Pennsylvania Law Review. 84 (6): 716–736. doi:10.2307/3307917. JSTOR 3307917. Archived from the original on October 8, 2014.
- Secretary of War (1904). "Appendix AAA: Technical Details of Engineering Methods on Fortifications, Rivers and Harbors, and Other Works". Annual Reports for the War Department for the Year Ended June 30, 1904. Volume VIII: Report of the Chief of Engineers. Part 4 (Report). Washington, D.C.: Government Printing Office.
