= United Dictionary Co. v. G. & C. Merriam Co. =

- Supreme Court of the United States

Argued January 23, 1908 Decided February 3, 1908
- Full case name: United Dictionary Co. v. G. & C. Merriam Co.
- Citations: 208 U.S. 260 (more) 28 S. Ct. 290; 52 L. Ed. 478

Holding
- The copyright statute does not require notice of the American copyright on books published abroad and sold only for use there.

Court membership
- Chief Justice Melville Fuller Associate Justices John M. Harlan · David J. Brewer; Edward D. White · Rufus W. Peckham; Joseph McKenna · Oliver W. Holmes Jr. William R. Day · William H. Moody

Case opinion
- Majority: Holmes, joined by unanimous

United Dictionary Co. v. G. & C. Merriam Co., 208 U.S. 260 (1907), was a United States Supreme Court case in which the Court held the copyright statute does not require notice of the American copyright on books published abroad and sold only for use there.
