= Linda Puchala =

American government official

Linda A. Puchala
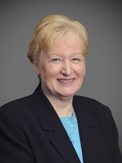

Chairman of the National Mediation Board
- In office July 1, 2022 – June 30, 2023
- President: Joe Biden
- Preceded by: Gerald W. Fauth III
- Succeeded by: Deirdre Hamilton
- In office July 1, 2019 – June 30, 2020
- President: Donald Trump
- Preceded by: Kyle Fortson
- Succeeded by: Kyle Fortson
- In office July 1, 2016 – June 30, 2017
- President: Barack Obama; Donald Trump
- Preceded by: Nicholas Geale
- Succeeded by: Harry R. Hoglander
- In office July 1, 2013 – June 30, 2014
- President: Barack Obama
- Preceded by: Harry R. Hoglander
- Succeeded by: Harry R. Hoglander
- In office July 1, 2011 – June 30, 2012
- President: Barack Obama
- Preceded by: Harry R. Hoglander
- Succeeded by: Harry R. Hoglander
- In office May 26, 2009 – June 30, 2010
- President: Barack Obama
- Preceded by: Read C. Van de Water
- Succeeded by: Harry R. Hoglander

Member of the National Mediation Board
- Incumbent
- Assumed office May 26, 2009
- President: Barack Obama; Donald Trump; Joe Biden
- Preceded by: Read Van de Water

Personal details
- Born: Michigan
- Political party: Democratic
- Education: Cleary University

Linda Puchala is an American government official who has served as a member of the National Mediation Board (NMB) since 2009. Puchala is the former president of the Association of Flight Attendants.

== Career ==
Puchala started as a flight attendant in 1969 with North Central Airlines; in a 1985 article she noted that was a time when women had to resign when they married or reached age 32. North Central Airlines merged with Republic Airlines and Puchala served as the master executive council chairperson.

In 1979 she was elected as president of the Association of Flight Attendants and, once she convinced her family to move to Washington, DC, she served in that role until 1986. Puchala viewed herself as a candidate for the position because of her ability to serve as a mediator. As noted in the 1982 book From sky girl to flight attendant: women and the making of a union, she faced multiple challenges including airline deregulation and rising costs. In 1984 the Association of Flight Attendants union was linked within the AFL–CIO, making Puchala the first female president of a chartered federation union. She was active in addressing issues with discrimination against women in aviation and in 1985 she spoke with the New York Times about how women are turning to unions in the aviation industry because of inequitable treatment. She also worked to increase the association's ability to effectively generate publications that were shared with members. In 1985, when Puchala was denied a place on the executive committee of the Air Line Pilots Association, labor activists were surprised and noted that despite advances, women were still not treated equally in the workplace.

Puchala served on President Barack Obama's transition team and he nominated her for the National Mediation Board in 2009. She was confirmed by the United States Senate on May 21, 2009. Her past with unions was noted as a positive given the pending contract negotiations between airlines and their unions, and the potential for conflict during the negotiations. She help negotiate contracts between labor unions and multiple companies including UPS, US Airways, and United Airlines. Her appointment to the National Mediation Board was viewed by some as a favor to unions given the board's changes to the National Rail Act in May 2010 which made it easier for unions to recruit new members.

President Donald Trump nominated her for an additional term on the National Mediation Board, and she was confirmed to a second term in August 2013.

She was confirmed by the U.S. Senate for her third term on November 2, 2017. In 2022, she was nominated by Joe Biden to serve as a member of the National Mediation Board.

Trade union offices
Preceded by Kelly Rueck	President of the Association of Flight Attendants; 1979–1986	Succeeded by Susan Bianchi-Sand
