= Railroad shopmen =

American rolling stock workers

Machinists working in a repair shop of the Illinois Central Railroad, 1942.

Railroad shopmen were employees of railroad companies charged with the construction, repair, and maintenance of the company's rolling stock. At the turn of the 20th century, approximately one fifth of railroad employees worked as shopmen, a broad group that came to include machinists, carpenters, boilermakers, electricians, sheet metal workers, and other related trades.

In 1922, some 400,000 American railroad shopmen collectively went on strike in a massive work stoppage remembered to history as the 1922 National Railroad Shopmen's Strike.

== Occupational history ==
=== Background ===
Beginning in the late 1820s, the technology of steam locomotion began to emerge as a commercially viable means of transportation in Europe and North America. The laying of train track and the production of locomotive engines, coaches, railroad cars, and other rolling stock became a major growth industry, attracting financial investors and entrepreneurs intent upon establishing lucrative railways for the transport of raw materials, finished goods, and passengers from place to place. The production and maintenance of this railway rolling stock became a major portion of business operations of these emerging transportation firms and dedicated employees collectively known as "railroad shopmen" were hired for the performance of these tasks.

The network of railways grew rapidly during the second half of the 19th century. By 1880 there were approximately 400,000 people (almost exclusively male) employed in the railroad industry of the United States: about 1 worker out of every 40. While the largest part of them were involved in the construction and maintenance of roadbeds and rails, the second-largest group was the shopmen charged with the construction and service of rolling stock. Approximately 20% of railroad employees then worked as shopmen, according to the investigation of one leading scholar.

Shopmen overhauling a locomotive on the Chicago and North Western Railway, 1942.

The railroads continued to grow dramatically through the first two decades of the 20th century. In 1917 in the United States the American government took control of rail transport, in conjunction with its entrance as a combatant in World War I. By then, the American rail network had grown to 360,000 miles of track, worked by 66,000 locomotives pulling approximately 2.5 million freight cars. Railroad employment grew commensurately; by 1920 more than 2.2 million Americans were employed in the railroad industry with the count of railroad shopmen alone topping the 400,000 mark. More Americans worked as railroad shopmen than were employed as steelworkers and meatpackers combined.

By 1920, railroad repair was one of the leading industrial sectors in the United States, with more than 1750 shops generating in excess of $700 million in value-added, an output that ranked third among the country's manufacturing industries.

=== Labor process ===
A variety of different craftspeople were needed for locomotive and car maintenance, including machinists and blacksmiths to fabricate and sustain metal parts, carpenters to produce and repair wooden interiors, and others. The stability of this employment seems to have varied in accordance with individual skill, with the employment of highly skilled mechanics relatively permanent, while less skilled shop hands and apprentices were put to work on a more transient basis.

A situation of uneasiness and distrust existed on some railway lines between the centralized management of the company and the employees at the various local shops. The theft of brass and copper was perceived by some lines as common; others saw periodic scandals in which company workers worked on their own personal projects on company time and with company raw materials or in which local foremen absconded with company lumber and labor to improve their own homes.

== See also ==
- List of American railway unions
- Gandy dancer
