= Yellow-dog contract =

Work contract where an employee agrees to not join a trade union

A yellow-dog contract (a yellow-dog clause of a contract, also known as an ironclad oath) is an agreement between an employer and an employee in which the employee agrees, as a condition of employment, not to be a member of a labor union. In the United States such employment contracts were historically used by employers to prevent the formation of unions, generally by permitting employers to take legal action against union organizers. In 1932, yellow-dog contracts were outlawed in the United States under the Norris–LaGuardia Act.

== Origin of term and brief history ==
Yellow-dog contracts were first observed in England during the first half of the 19th century. However, they would ultimately not matter much in labor struggles in England. Yellow-dog contracts would matter substantially more in labor disputes in the United States.

In the 1870s, a written agreement containing a pledge not to join a union was commonly referred to as the "Infamous Document". This strengthens the belief that American employers in their resort to individual contracts were consciously following English precedents. This anti-union pledge was also called an "iron clad document," and from this time until the close of the 19th century "iron-clad" was the customary name for the non-union promise. Beginning with New York in 1887, sixteen states wrote on their statute books declarations making it a criminal act to force employees to agree not to join unions. The Congress of the United States incorporated in the Erdman Act of 1898 a provision relating to carriers engaged in interstate commerce.

During the last decade of the 19th century and the opening years of the 20th, the individual, anti-union promise declined in importance as an instrument in labor warfare. Its novelty had worn off; workers no longer felt themselves morally bound to live up to it and union organizers, of course, wholly disregarded it. In the early 20th century, the individual, anti-union promise was resorted to frequently in coal mining and in the metal trades. And it was not membership in a union that was usually prohibited, but participation in those essential activities without which membership is valueless.

In 1910, the International United Brotherhood of Leather Workers on Horse Goods, following an unsuccessful conference with the National Saddlery Manufacturers' Association, called a national strike in the saddlery industry for the 8-hour day. The strike proved a failure, and a large number of employers required oral or written promises to abandon and remain out of the organization as a condition of re-employment.

In the case Adair v. United States, the United States Supreme Court's majority held that the provision of the Erdman Act relating to discharge, because it would compel an employer to accept or retain the personal services of another person against the employer's will, was a violation of the Fifth Amendment to the Constitution, which declares that no person shall be deprived of liberty or property without due process of law. The court was careful, however, to restrict the decision to the provision relating to discharge, and to express no opinion as to the remainder of the law. The section of the Erdman Act making it criminal to force employees to sign anti-union agreements therefore remained unadjudicated.

The term yellow dog started appearing in the spring of 1921, in leading articles and editorials devoted to the subject which appeared in the labor press. Typical was the comment of the editor of the United Mine Workers' Journal: "This agreement has been well named. It is yellow dog for sure. It reduces to the level of a yellow dog any man that signs it, for he signs away every right he possesses under the Constitution and laws of the land and makes himself the truckling, helpless slave of the employer."

Even though they were forbidden in the private sector by the Norris–LaGuardia Act in 1932, yellow-dog contracts were allowed in public sector, including many government jobs, such as teachers, until the 1960s, beginning with precedent established in 1915 with Frederick v. Owens.

In 1932, Joel I. Seidman wrote the first-ever book on the topic, The Yellow Dog Contract. It traced their history from the 1830s in the United Kingdom, the 1870s in the United States, the use of the term "yellow dog" following World War I, to a land-mark event when the U.S. Senate rejected the nomination of Judge John J. Parker to the United States Supreme Court.

== Legal status ==
- In the public sector, some union restrictions sometimes persisted until the mid-20th century, but most modern labor regulations effectively prohibit such obligations.

== See also ==
- Christian Labour Association of Canada
- Coppage v. Kansas
- Labor rights
- Labour law
