= George Wallace William Hanger =

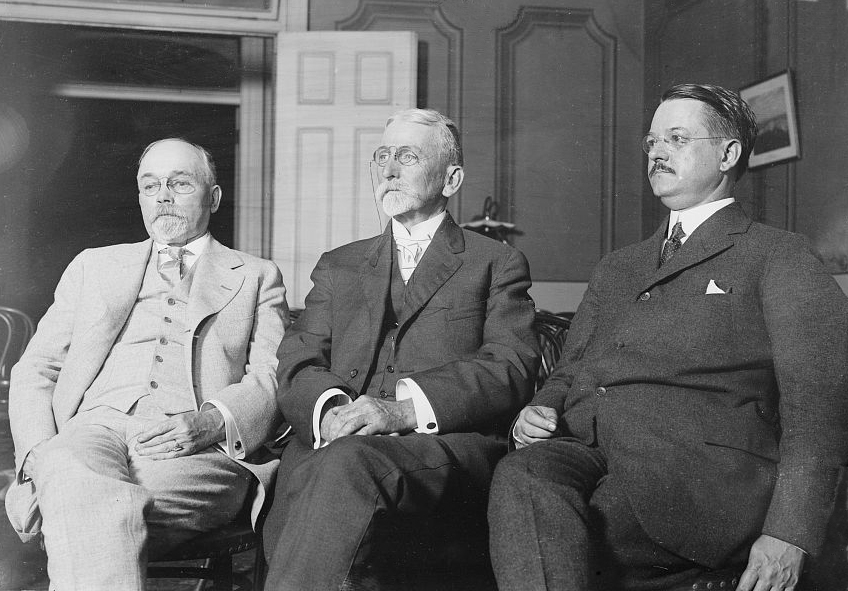
- Martin Augustine Knapp, William Lea Chambers and George W. W. Hanger in 1913

Acting Commissioner of Labor Statistics
- In office May 1913 – August 1913
- President: Woodrow Wilson
- Preceded by: Charles P. Neill
- Succeeded by: Royal Meeker

Personal details
- Born: March 28, 1866; Augusta County, Virginia
- Died: December 26, 1935 (aged 69); New York, New York
- Education: Lebanon Valley College

George Wallace William Hanger (March 28, 1866 – December 26, 1935) was a mediator for the Federal Board of Mediation and Conciliation and held other positions for government agencies involved in the resolution of labor disputes.

== Biography ==
He was born on March 28, 1866. He worked for the United States Bureau of Labor in 1887 as chief statistician and administrative assistant between 1887 and 1913. From 1913 to 1920 he was a member of the Board of Mediation and Conciliation. He was assistant director of the Railroad Labor Board from 1918 to 1920, and remained a member of the Board until 1926, after which he served on the United States Board of Mediation for the remainder of his career. He was involved in the settlement of many major labor disputes, including his 1927 selection by the United States Board of Mediation as a special mediator in the wage dispute between the Eastern railroads and the Brotherhood of Locomotive Firemen and Enginemen. He died on December 26, 1935.
