= List of American railway unions =

The following is a list of unions and brotherhoods playing a significant role in the railroad industry of the United States of America. Many of these entities changed names and merged over the years; this list is based upon the names current during the height of American railway unionism in the first decades of the 20th century.

== Brotherhoods ==
=== "Big Four" brotherhoods ===
July 1895 issue of Brotherhood of Locomotive Engineers Journal, the monthly magazine of the BLE.

Originating as fraternal benefit societies to provide life insurance, sickness benefits, and social interaction for their members, the so-called "Big Four" railroad brotherhoods gradually evolved into trade unions dealing with wages, hours, and safety standards. As the importance of the railway sector to the American economy grew during the last years of the 19th century and first decades of the 20th century, these emerged as among the most powerful group of unions in the United States. In the summer of 1916, the joint threat of the so-called "Big Four" brotherhoods to launch a national railroad strike moved President Woodrow Wilson and the United States Congress to pass the Adamson Act, granting an eight-hour working day to American railway workers.

- Brotherhood of Locomotive Engineers (BLE) — The Brotherhood of Locomotive Engineers was founded in 1863 as the "Brotherhood of the Footboard" to represent the prestigious and relatively well compensated locomotive engineers. The organization was not part of the American Federation of Labor and was governed by conventions of elected delegates held every three years. The brotherhood was financially prosperous and initiated a network of labor banks based in Cleveland, Ohio to better marshal the assets of itself and its members. The BLE published a monthly magazine for its members, Locomotive Engineers' Journal.
- Order of Railway Conductors of America (ORC) — The ORC was established in 1868 in Amboy, Illinois as the "Conductors Union." The ORC represented the interests of train conductors, whose job function approximated that of an ocean ship captain and were consequently the most prestigious and highly compensated railway workers of their era. The ORC was governed by conventions held every three years and was not part of the American Federation of Labor. In later years membership in the union was opened up to railway brakemen and the name of the union was changed to the "Order of Railway Conductors and Brakemen" (ORC&B). In 1969 the ORC&B merged with the Brotherhood of Locomotive Firemen and Enginemen, the Brotherhood of Railroad Trainmen, and the Switchmen's Union of North America to form the "United Transportation Union" (UTU).
- Brotherhood of Locomotive Firemen and Enginemen (B of LF&E) — The "Brotherhood of Locomotive Firemen" was established in 1873 to provide insurance, social benefits, and fraternal association for locomotive firemen, individuals who rode in the locomotive with the train operator and who were primarily charged with stoking the engine with coal or other combustible material to maintain the steam needed for propulsion. Over time, these individuals were frequently promoted to higher-paid positions as engine drivers, while still seeking to maintain membership in the old brotherhood. This prompted a change of name for the organization to "Brotherhood of Locomotive Firemen and Enginemen" (B of LF&E) in 1907. The B of LF was not affiliated with the American Federation of Labor. It published a monthly magazine for its members, Locomotive Firemen's Magazine. In 1969, the B of LF&E merged with the Order of Railway Conductors and Brakemen, the Brotherhood of Railroad Trainmen, and the Switchmen's Union of North America to form the "United Transportation Union" (UTU).
- Brotherhood of Railroad Trainmen (BRT) — Founded in 1883, by the 1920s the Brotherhood of Railroad Trainmen emerged as one of the largest American railway brotherhoods, with a membership of approximately 180,000 in 1925. The brotherhood included among its members freight handlers, as well as other classes of railroad employees and periodically had jurisdictional disputes over coverage of its members with the Order of Railway Conductors. In 1969, the BRT merged with the Order of Railway Conductors and Brakemen, the Brotherhood of Locomotive Firemen and Engineers, and the Switchmen's Union of North America to form the "United Transportation Union" (UTU).

=== Other railroad brotherhoods and unions ===
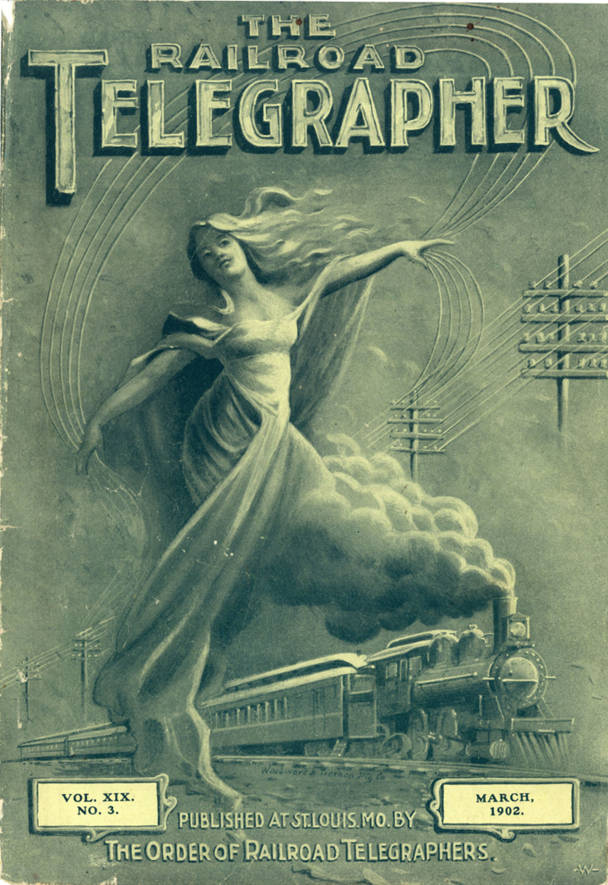
Cover of the March 1902 issue of The Railroad Telegrapher, official organ of the Order of Railroad Telegraphers.

- Railroad Yardmasters of America.
- Grand International Union of Locomotive Firemen – The Grand International Union of Locomotive Firemen was a relatively short-lived rival of the Brotherhood of Locomotive Firemen during the decade of the 1870s. This group actually predated the latter organization, having been launched in April 1866. The Grand International Union of Locomotive Firemen published a monthly magazine in Schenectady, New York for its members, Locomotive Firemen's Journal.
- Order of Railroad Telegraphers (ORT) – The Order of Railroad Telegraphers was launched in 1886 and became part of the American Federation of Labor in 1899. Telegraphers were an integral part of the American railway system coordinating operations throughout the road network. The ORT was governed by delegated conventions held once every three years. The order published a monthly magazine for its members called The Railroad Telegrapher.
- Brotherhood of Maintenance of Way Employes (BMWED) – The Brotherhood of Maintenance of Way Employes' Union was established in July 1887 and joined the American Federation of Labor in 1900. The union represented workers involved in the repair and expansion of roadbeds, track, bridges, structures and buildings as well as semi-skilled railroad shopmen involved with the maintenance of rolling stock. The brotherhood was governed by conventions held every three years. The BMWED is now part of the Rail Conference with the International Brotherhood of Teamsters
- Switchmen's Union of North America – The Switchmen's Union of North America was organized in 1894 and joined the American Federation of Labor in 1906.
- Brotherhood of Railway Clerks (BRC) – This organization was established in 1899 as the "Order of Railway Clerks" but soon changed its name to more closely resemble the monikers of other railway unions of the day.
- Brotherhood of Railroad Signalmen of America (BRS) – The Brotherhood of Railroad Signalmen was founded in 1908 to represent workers charged with physical operation and maintenance of stop-and-go track signals. The brotherhood joined the American Federation of Labor in 1914.
- Brotherhood of Railroad Brakemen (BRB) –
- Brotherhood of Federated Railway Employees (BFRE) –
- Switchmen's Union of North America (SUNA) – In 1969, the SUNA merged with the Order of Railway Conductors and Brakemen, the Brotherhood of Railroad Trainmen, and the Brotherhood of Railroad Trainmen to form the "United Transportation Union" (UTU).
- The American Railway Supervisors Association (ARASA)-

== Unions for African-American railway workers ==
Owing to the segregation of the railroad brotherhoods for much of their history, a parallel network of unions emerged to serve the interests of black railway workers.

- Colored Trainmen of America
- Colored Association of Railroad Employees
- Interstate Association of Negro Trainmen
- Railway Men's Benevolent Industrial Association (RMBIA) – The RMBIA was established in 1915 in an effort to form a single federation of black railway workers. The RMBIA lobbied for legislation banning racial discrimination in rail contracts and participated in lawsuits over wages and working conditions.
- Brotherhood of Sleeping Car Porters (BSCP) – The Brotherhood of Sleeping Car Porters was organized in 1924 as an alternative to a company union formed in 1920. The organization was formed to improve the wages and hours of labor of the porters working in Pullman cars, who were almost exclusively black at the time of the union's formation. Although not affiliated with the American Federation of Labor at the time of its formation, the union worked to organize Pullman porters with the blessings of AF of L President William Green. The chief organizer of the union was A. Philip Randolph and the official publication of the organization during its initial phase was Randolph's monthly magazine, The Messenger.

== Industrial unions ==
- Steam Railroad Men’s Protective Union (SRMPU) – A multi-craft benevolent association which emerged in Boston in 1888. After a quick period of growth to a membership of about 30,000, the organization dissolved in 1890.
- American Railroad Union (ARU) – Established in 1893 by Eugene V. Debs, formerly magazine editor and a functionary of the Brotherhood of Locomotive Firemen. The union won one major strike against the Great Northern Railroad early in 1894 before coming to grief later that summer in a great strike and boycott against the Pullman Palace Car Company of Chicago.
- United Transportation Union (UTU) – Established in 1969 by a merger of the Brotherhood of Locomotive Firemen and Enginemen, the Order of Railway Conductors and Brakemen, the Brotherhood of Railroad Trainmen, and the Switchmen's Union of North America.

== General unions ==
Although not limited in scope to workers on the railroads, these unions included among their members substantial contingents of railway employees.

- Knights of Labor (KOL) –
- International Association of Machinists (IAM) –
- International Brotherhood of Teamsters (IBT) –

== Railroad Worker Grass Roots Organizations ==
- Railroad Workers United [RWU] – While not a union, RWU is a diverse group of cross craft railroad workers whose goals are: Unity of All Rail Crafts, An End to Inter-Union Conflict, Rank-and-File Democracy, Membership Participation and Action, Solidarity, No to Concessionary Bargaining

== See also ==
- History of rail transport in the United States
