= National Mediation Board =

US government railroad and airline labour agency

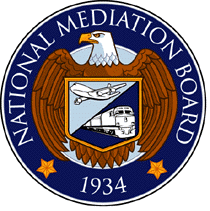
- NMB seal

Agency overview
- Formed: June 21, 1934
- Jurisdiction: Federal government of the United States
- Headquarters: Washington, D.C.
- Employees: 38 (2021)
- Annual budget: $14.3 million (2021)
- Agency executive: Loren Sweatt, Chairman
- Website: www.nmb.gov

The National Mediation Board (NMB) is an independent agency of the United States government that coordinates labor-management relations within the American railroad and airline industries.

== History ==
The board was established by the 1934 amendments to the Railway Labor Act of 1926 and is headed by a three-person panel of Presidential appointees.

NMB programs provide an integrated dispute resolution process to meet the statutory objective of minimizing strikes and other work stoppages in the airline and railroad industries. The NMB's integrated processes specifically are designed to promote three statutory goals:

- The prompt and orderly resolution of disputes arising out of the negotiation of new or revised collective bargaining agreements;
- The effectuation of employee rights of self-organization where a representation dispute exists; and
- The prompt and orderly resolution of disputes over the interpretation or application of existing agreements.

== Contracts ==
Under the Railway Labor Act, an airline or railroad union contract does not expire; it remains in force and amendable until a new contract is ratified by the union members or either side exercises "self-help," which could be a strike by employees or a lockout by management. Before this can happen, the NMB-appointed mediator must declare an impasse in negotiations, which starts a 30-day cooling off period, during which negotiations continue. Once the 30-day period has passed, either side is free to exercise self-help, unless the President authorizes a Presidential Emergency Board, which issues non-binding recommendations followed by another 30-day cooling off period. The US Congress also has the power to impose a contract, as they did for railroads in 2022.

== Board members ==
The Board is composed of three members, nominated by the President of the United States, with the advice and consent of the Senate, for terms of three years. The terms are staggered, so one term expires on July 1 every year. At the end of their term of office a member may continue to serve until a successor takes office, or they are themselves confirmed for another term.

The board annually designates a member to act as chairman. Two members of the board constitutes a quorum.

=== Current board members ===
The current board members as of May 24, 2026:

Position	Name	Party	Sworn in	Term expires
Chair	Loren Sweatt	Republican	April 2, 2024	July 1, 2026
Member	Linda Puchala	Democratic	May 21, 2009	July 1, 2027
Member	Vacant (Note: Deirdre Hamilton was fired by Trump. She is contesting her firing in court.)			July 1, 2028

=== Nominations ===
President Trump has nominated the following to fill seats on the board. They await Senate confirmation.

Name	Party	Term expires	Replacing
Douglas Ralph	—N/a	July 1, 2028	Deirdre Hamilton
Loren Sweatt	Republican	July 1, 2029	Reappointment

== See also ==
- Title 29 of the Code of Federal Regulations
- Newlands Labor Act
- National Labor Relations Board
- Federal Mediation and Conciliation Service (United States)
