= Erdman Act =

- Other short titles: Erdman Arbitration Act · Act of June 1, 1898
- Long title: An Act Concerning carriers engaged in interstate commerce and their employees.
- Enacted by: the 55th United States Congress
- Effective: June 1, 1898

Citations
- Statutes at Large: 30 Stat. 424

Codification
- Acts repealed: Arbitration Act of 1888 (superseded)

Legislative history
- Introduced in the House as H.R. 4372 by D‑PA Constantine Jacob Erdmanth; Committee consideration by House Committee on Labor · Senate Committee on Interstate Commerce; Passed the House on May 5, 1898 (Voice vote); Passed the Senate on May 12, 1898 (Voice vote); Reported by the joint conference committee on May 1898; agreed to by the House on May 19, 1898 (Voice vote (agreed to conference report)) and by the Senate on May 24, 1898 (Voice vote (agreed to conference report)); Signed into law by President William McKinley on June 1, 1898

United States Supreme Court cases
- Adair v. United States (1908)

The Erdman Act of 1898 was a United States federal law regulating railroad labor disputes. The law provided arbitration for disputes between the interstate railroads and their workers organized into unions.

== Major provisions ==
The most significant portion of the act prohibited a railroad company from demanding that a worker not join a union as a condition for employment (Section 10).

The interstate requirement affected individuals who worked on moving trains, such as firemen, brakemen, telegraphers, and conductors, providing that the train transported freight and passengers between states. Workers who maintained railroad cars and station clerks did not come under the statute's jurisdiction. While the arbitration system created by the act was voluntary, the results were binding if all sides agreed to arbitrate.

Capital and labor each chose one of three arbitrators under the act; if they could not agree upon a third, the government would. The Chair of the Interstate Commerce Commission and the United States Commissioner of Labor, acting in concert, made that choice under those circumstances.

The act made it unlawful to strike or fire a worker during the arbitration process; it also made it illegal to terminate the employment of a worker involved in the dispute while arbitration was pending, except for neglecting duty or inefficiency.

In Adair v. United States (1908), the United States Supreme Court declared Section 10 of the Erdman Act unconstitutional.

== See also ==
- History of rail transport in the United States
