= Sparf v. United States =

- Supreme Court of the United States

Submitted March 5, 1894 Decided January 21, 1895
- Full case name: Sparf and Hansen v. United States
- Citations: 156 U.S. 51 (more) 15 S. Ct. 273; 39 L. Ed. 343; 1895 U.S. LEXIS 2120

Case history
- Prior: Error to the Circuit Court of the United States for the Northern District of California

Holding
- If one of two people who have committed murder makes a voluntary confession in front of the other, that confession is admissible against both, however not without the other person witnessing it.; A court may not direct the jury to return a guilty verdict.; A jury may convict someone of a lesser crime provided the elements of that crime are included in the original offense.; A court may instruct the jury to consider guilt only the alleged offenses, in the case of a person accused of murder, rather than any lesser offenses.; Juries shall not be informed of their right to decide the law; however this does not prevent them from doing so.

Court membership
- Chief Justice Melville Fuller Associate Justices Stephen J. Field · John M. Harlan; Horace Gray · David J. Brewer; Henry B. Brown · George Shiras Jr. Howell E. Jackson · Edward D. White

Case opinions
- Majority: Harlan, joined by Fuller, Field, Jackson, White
- Concurrence: Jackson
- Dissent: Brewer, joined by Brown
- Dissent: Gray, joined by Shiras
- This case overturned a previous ruling or rulings
- United States v. Susan B. Anthony (1873)

Sparf v. United States, 156 U.S. 51 (1895), or Sparf and Hansen v. United States, was a United States Supreme Court case testing the admissibility of confessions by multiple defendants accused of the same crime, and the rights of juries.

== Background ==
On the night of January 13, 1884, on a voyage to Tahiti, the second mate, a man called Maurice Fitzgerald, of the Hesper was found to be missing. It was believed that he had been killed and his body thrown overboard. The ship's captain, Sodergren, suspected three men, the crew members St. Clair, Hansen, and Sparf, of being participants in the murder. Sodergren kept the three suspects in holding until they arrived in Tahiti, where they were taken ashore by the United States consul at that island and were subsequently sent, with others, to San Francisco, on the vessel Tropic Bird. There they were tried for the murder of Fitzgerald and convicted.

== Decision ==
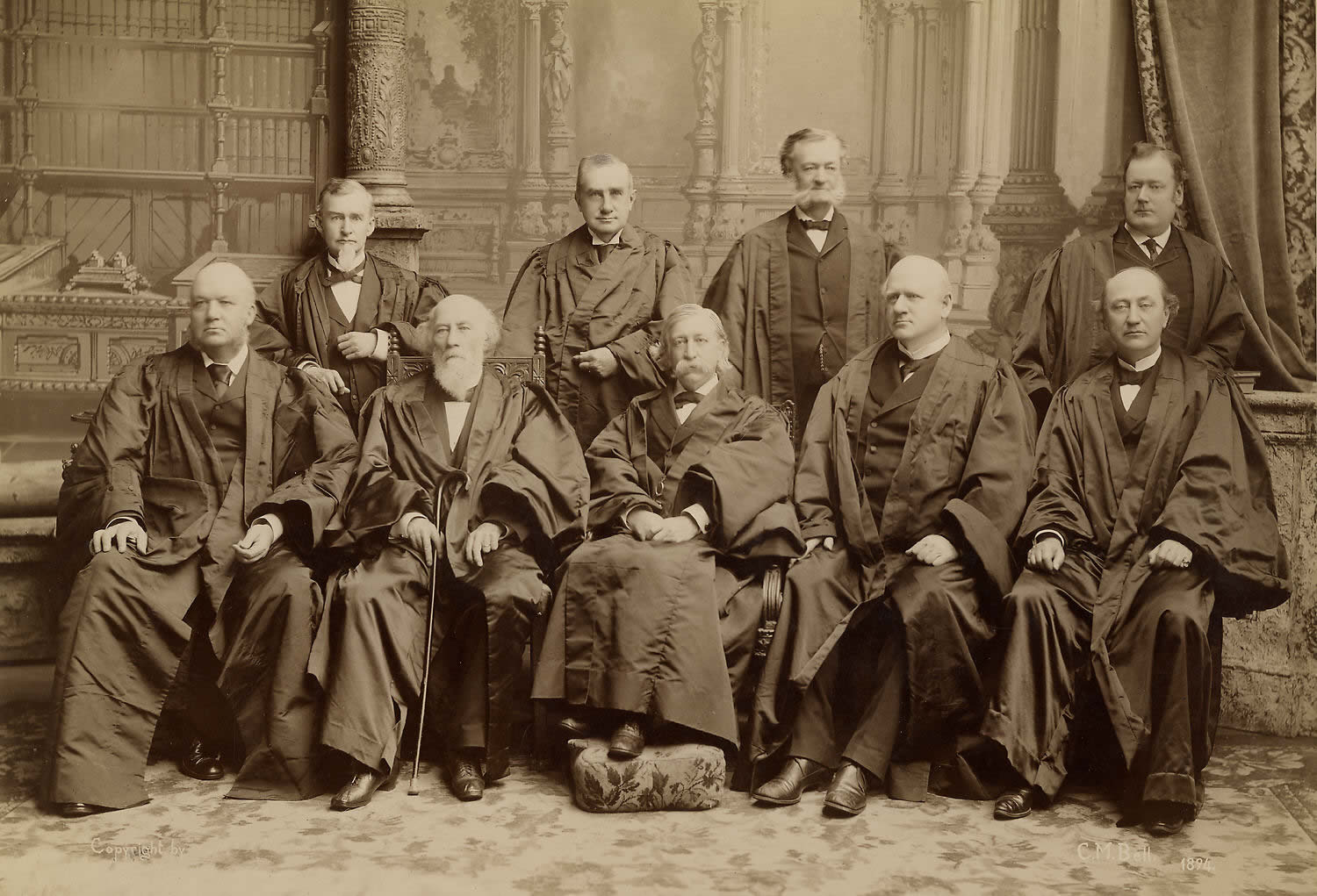
The Fuller Court.

The Court issued its decision on January 21, 1895 by a 5-4 vote, with Justice Harlan giving the majority opinion.

=== Confessions with multiple defendants ===
The court held that if one of two persons, accused of having together committed the crime of murder, makes a voluntary confession in the presence of the other, without threat or coercion, the confession is admissible in evidence against both. However, declarations of one accomplice after the killing made in the absence of the other implicating the guilt of both are admissible in evidence only against the one making the declarations, not against the other.

=== Rights of juries ===
Sparf v. United States ended the 100-years old custom of informing the jury of their right to decide both statutory law and facts. Since then, judges do not inform juries of their power to nullify the case statute, although that power is universally acknowledged.

Justice Harlan, speaking for the majority, quoted Kane v. Com., 1 Cr. Law Mag. 51, 56:

"'... We must hold, to enable us to avoid the inconsistency, that, subject to the qualification that all acquittals are final, the law in criminal cases is to be determined by the court. In this way we have our liberties and rights determined, not by an irresponsible, but by a responsible, tribunal; not by a tribunal ignorant of the law, but by a tribunal trained to and disciplined by the law; not by an irreversible tribunal, but by a reversible tribunal; not by a tribunal which makes its own law, but by a tribunal that obeys the law as made. In this way we maintain two fundamental maxims. The first is that, while juries answer facts, the court answers the laws. The second, which is still more important, is ‘Nullum crimen, nulla poena, sine lege.’ Unless there is a violation of law preannounced, and this by a constant and responsible tribunal, there is no crime, and can be no punishment.' We must therefore accept that the jury are no more judges of law in criminal than in civil cases, with the qualification that, owing to the peculiar doctrine of autrefois acquit, a criminal acquittal by a jury cannot be overhauled by the court.’"

Sparf remains the last direct opinion of the Court on jury nullification.

Justice Gray spoke for those dissenting, saying "It is universally conceded that a verdict of acquittal, although rendered against the instructions of the judge, is final, and cannot be set aside; and consequently that the jury have the legal power to decide for themselves the law involved in the general issues of guilty or not guilty."

== See also ==
- List of United States Supreme Court cases, volume 156
- Jury nullification
