= List of United States Supreme Court cases, volume 156 =

Supreme Court of the United States
- Interactive map of Supreme Court of the United States
- 38°53′26″N 77°00′16″W
- Established: March 4, 1789; 236 years ago
- Location: Washington, D.C.
- Coordinates: 38°53′26″N 77°00′16″W
- Composition method: Presidential nomination with Senate confirmation
- Authorised by: Constitution of the United States, Art. III, § 1
- Judge term length: life tenure, subject to impeachment and removal
- Number of positions: 9 (by statute)
- Website: supremecourt.gov

This is a list of cases reported in volume 156 of United States Reports, decided by the Supreme Court of the United States in 1895.

== Justices of the Supreme Court at the time of volume 156 U.S. ==
The Supreme Court is established by Article III, Section 1 of the Constitution of the United States, which says: "The judicial Power of the United States, shall be vested in one supreme Court . . .". The size of the Court is not specified; the Constitution leaves it to Congress to set the number of justices. Under the Judiciary Act of 1789 Congress originally fixed the number of justices at six (one chief justice and five associate justices). Since 1789 Congress has varied the size of the Court from six to seven, nine, ten, and back to nine justices (always including one chief justice).

When the cases in volume 156 were decided the Court comprised the following nine members:

| Portrait | Justice | Office | Home State | Succeeded | Date confirmed by the Senate (Vote) | Tenure on Supreme Court |
|---|---|---|---|---|---|---|
| | Melville Fuller | Chief Justice | Illinois | Morrison Waite | July 20, 1888 (41–20) | October 8, 1888 – July 4, 1910 (Died) |
| | Stephen Johnson Field | Associate Justice | California | newly created seat | March 10, 1863 (Acclamation) | May 10, 1863 – December 1, 1897 (Retired) |
| | John Marshall Harlan | Associate Justice | Kentucky | David Davis | November 29, 1877 (Acclamation) | December 10, 1877 – October 14, 1911 (Died) |
| | Horace Gray | Associate Justice | Massachusetts | Nathan Clifford | December 20, 1881 (51–5) | January 9, 1882 – September 15, 1902 (Died) |
| | David Josiah Brewer | Associate Justice | Kansas | Stanley Matthews | December 18, 1889 (53–11) | January 6, 1890 – March 28, 1910 (Died) |
| | Henry Billings Brown | Associate Justice | Michigan | Samuel Freeman Miller | December 29, 1890 (Acclamation) | January 5, 1891 – May 28, 1906 (Retired) |
| | George Shiras Jr. | Associate Justice | Pennsylvania | Joseph P. Bradley | July 26, 1892 (Acclamation) | October 10, 1892 – February 23, 1903 (Retired) |
| | Howell Edmunds Jackson | Associate Justice | Tennessee | Lucius Quintus Cincinnatus Lamar | February 18, 1893 (Acclamation) | March 4, 1893 – August 8, 1895 (Died) |
| | Edward Douglass White | Associate Justice | Louisiana | Samuel Blatchford | February 19, 1894 (Acclamation) | March 12, 1894 – December 18, 1910 (Continued as chief justice) |

== Notable Cases in 156 U.S. ==
=== United States v. E.C. Knight Co. ===
United States v. E.C. Knight Co., 156 U.S. 1 (1895), also known as the "Sugar Trust Case," is an antitrust decision that severely limited the federal government's power to pursue antitrust actions under the Sherman Antitrust Act. The Supreme Court held that Congress could not regulate manufacturing, thus giving state governments the sole power to take legal action against manufacturing monopolies. The case has never been overruled, but in Swift & Co. v. United States and subsequent cases the Court has held that Congress can regulate manufacturing when it affects interstate commerce.

=== Sparf v. United States ===
Sparf v. United States, 156 U.S. 51 (1895), is a criminal law decision by the Supreme Court. The Court held that if one of two persons accused of having together committed the crime of murder makes a voluntary confession in the presence of the other, without threat or coercion, then the confession is admissible in evidence against both. In addition, the Court clarified several questions relating to the duty of federal criminal juries, and of federal courts when instructing them.

=== Coffin v. United States ===
In Coffin v. United States, 156 U.S. 432 (1895), the Supreme Court confirmed the presumption of innocence of persons accused of crimes.

== Citation style ==
Under the Judiciary Act of 1789 the federal court structure at the time comprised District Courts, which had general trial jurisdiction; Circuit Courts, which had mixed trial and appellate (from the US District Courts) jurisdiction; and the United States Supreme Court, which had appellate jurisdiction over the federal District and Circuit courts—and for certain issues over state courts. The Supreme Court also had limited original jurisdiction (i.e., in which cases could be filed directly with the Supreme Court without first having been heard by a lower federal or state court). There were one or more federal District Courts and/or Circuit Courts in each state, territory, or other geographical region.

The Judiciary Act of 1891 created the United States Courts of Appeals and reassigned the jurisdiction of most routine appeals from the district and circuit courts to these appellate courts. The Act created nine new courts that were originally known as the "United States circuit courts of appeals." The new courts had jurisdiction over most appeals of lower court decisions. The Supreme Court could review either legal issues that a court of appeals certified or decisions of court of appeals by writ of certiorari.

Bluebook citation style is used for case names, citations, and jurisdictions.

- "# Cir." = United States Court of Appeals
  - e.g., "3d Cir." = United States Court of Appeals for the Third Circuit
- "C.C.D." = United States Circuit Court for the District of . . .
  - e.g.,"C.C.D.N.J." = United States Circuit Court for the District of New Jersey
- "D." = United States District Court for the District of . . .
  - e.g.,"D. Mass." = United States District Court for the District of Massachusetts
- "E." = Eastern; "M." = Middle; "N." = Northern; "S." = Southern; "W." = Western
  - e.g.,"C.C.S.D.N.Y." = United States Circuit Court for the Southern District of New York
  - e.g.,"M.D. Ala." = United States District Court for the Middle District of Alabama
- "Ct. Cl." = United States Court of Claims
- The abbreviation of a state's name alone indicates the highest appellate court in that state's judiciary at the time.
  - e.g.,"Pa." = Supreme Court of Pennsylvania
  - e.g.,"Me." = Supreme Judicial Court of Maine

== List of cases in volume 156 U.S. ==
| Case Name | Page & year | Opinion of the Court | Concurring opinion(s) | Dissenting opinion(s) | Lower Court | Disposition |
|---|---|---|---|---|---|---|
| United States v. E.C. Knight Co. | 1 (1895) | Fuller | none | Harlan | 3d Cir. | affirmed |
| Stuart v. City of Easton | 46 (1895) | Fuller | none | none | C.C.E.D. Pa. | reversed |
| Rouse v. Letcher | 47 (1895) | Fuller | none | none | 8th Cir. | dismissed |
| Sparf v. United States | 51 (1895) | Harlan | none | Brewer | C.C.N.D. Cal. | multiple |
| In re Robertson | 183 (1895) | Fuller | none | none | Va. | dismissed |
| Dunbar v. United States | 185 (1895) | Brewer | none | none | D. Or. | affirmed |
| Delaware et al. Co. v. Pennsylvania | 200 (1895) | Fuller | none | none | Pa. | reversed |
| Lazarus v. Phelps | 202 (1895) | Brown | none | none | C.C.N.D. Tex. | affirmed |
| In re Streep | 207 (1895) | Fuller | none | none | C.C.S.D.N.Y. | mandamus denied |
| Lindsay v. Burgess | 208 (1895) | Fuller | none | none | C.C.E.D. Tenn. | affirmed |
| Postal T.C. Co. v. City of Baltimore | 210 (1895) | Fuller | none | none | Md. | affirmed |
| In Re Chapman | 211 (1895) | Fuller | none | none | Sup. Ct. D.C. | habeas corpus denied |
| McGahan v. Bank of Rondout | 218 (1895) | Fuller | none | none | C.C.D.S.C. | affirmed |
| Mattox v. United States | 237 (1895) | Brown | none | Shiras | D. Kan. | affirmed |
| Roller Mill Patent | 261 (1895) | Brown | none | none | C.C.N.D. Ill. | affirmed |
| Andrews v. Swartz | 272 (1895) | Harlan | none | none | C.C.D.N.J. | affirmed |
| Hudson v. Parker | 277 (1895) | Gray | none | Brewer | W.D. Ark. | mandamus granted |
| Emert v. Missouri | 296 (1895) | Gray | none | none | Mo. | affirmed |
| In re Lehigh M. & M. Co. | 322 (1895) | Fuller | none | none | C.C.W.D. Va. | mandamus denied |
| Brown v. Webster | 328 (1895) | White | none | none | C.C.D. Neb. | affirmed |
| Bank of Rondout v. Smith | 330 (1895) | Fuller | none | none | C.C.D.S.C. | dismissed |
| Connell v. Smiley | 335 (1895) | Fuller | none | none | C.C.D. Neb. | affirmed |
| Palmer v. Village of Corning | 342 (1895) | White | none | none | C.C.N.D.N.Y. | affirmed |
| Maricopa & P.R.R. Co. v. Arizona | 347 (1895) | White | none | none | Sup. Ct. Terr. Ariz. | affirmed |
| United States ex rel. Siegel v. Thoman | 353 (1895) | White | none | none | C.C.E.D. La. | affirmed |
| Waldron v. Waldron | 361 (1895) | White | none | none | C.C.N.D. Ill. | reversed |
| Winter v. City of Montgomery | 385 (1895) | Fuller | none | none | Ala. | dismissed |
| Illinois C.R.R. Co. v. Brown | 386 (1895) | Fuller | none | none | C.C.W.D. Tenn. | dismissed |
| Hays v. Steiger | 387 (1895) | Field | none | none | Cal. | affirmed |
| Mather v. Rillston | 391 (1895) | Field | none | none | C.C.W.D. Mich. | affirmed |
| Cunningham v. Mason & B.R.R. Co. | 400 (1895) | White | none | none | C.C.S.D. Ga. | affirmed |
| Batchelor v. United States | 426 (1895) | Gray | none | none | C.C.D. Mont. | reversed |
| Coffin v. United States | 432 (1895) | White | none | none | D. Ind. | reversed |
| Bannon v. United States | 464 (1895) | Brown | none | none | D. Or. | affirmed |
| Bell S. & C.M. Co. v. First Nat'l Bank | 470 (1895) | Field | none | none | Sup. Ct. Terr. Mont. | affirmed |
| St. Louis et al. Ry. Co. v. Missouri ex rel. Merriam | 478 (1895) | Shiras | none | none | Mo. | dismissed |
| Lindsay v. First Nat'l Bank | 485 (1895) | Shiras | none | none | C.C.W.D. La. | reversed |
| Carr v. Fife | 494 (1895) | Shiras | none | none | C.C.D. Wash. | affirmed |
| National C.R. Co. v. Boston C.I.R. Co. | 502 (1895) | Brown | none | none | C.C.D. Mass. | reversed |
| Goldey v. Morning News | 518 (1895) | Gray | none | none | C.C.E.D.N.Y. | affirmed |
| Evers v. Watson | 527 (1895) | Brown | none | none | C.C.N.D. Miss. | affirmed |
| Ard v. Brandon | 537 (1895) | Brewer | none | none | Kan. | reversed |
| Maddox v. Burnham | 544 (1895) | Brewer | none | none | Kan. | affirmed |
| Wood v. Beach | 548 (1895) | Brewer | none | none | Kan. | affirmed |
| United States v. Berdan F. Mfg. Co. | 552 (1895) | Brewer | none | none | Ct. Cl. | affirmed |
| Corinne Mill C. & S. Co. v. Johnson | 574 (1895) | Brewer | none | none | Sup. Ct. Terr. Utah | affirmed |
| Pittsburgh & S.C. Co. v. Bates | 577 (1895) | Field | none | none | La. | affirmed |
| Pittsburgh & S.C. Co. v. Louisiana | 590 (1895) | Field | none | none | La. | affirmed |
| Saltonstall v. Weibusch | 601 (1895) | Brown | none | none | C.C.D. Mass. | reversed |
| Grimm v. United States | 604 (1895) | Brewer | none | none | E.D. Mo. | affirmed |
| Black Diamond C.M. Co. v. Excelsior C. Co. | 611 (1895) | Brown | none | none | C.C.N.D. Cal. | reversed |
| Johnson v. Atlantic et al. Co. | 618 (1895) | Shiras | none | none | C.C.N.D. Fla. | affirmed |
| St. Louis et al. Ry. Co. v. Gill | 649 (1895) | Shiras | none | none | Ark. | affirmed |
| Norfolk & W.R.R. Co. v. Pendleton | 667 (1895) | Shiras | none | none | Va. | affirmed |
| Fox v. Haarstick | 674 (1895) | Shiras | none | none | Sup. Ct. Terr. Utah | affirmed |
| Davis v. Wakelee | 680 (1895) | Brown | none | none | C.C.S.D.N.Y. | affirmed |
| Citizens' S. & L. Ass'n v. Perry Cnty. | 692 (1895) | Harlan | none | none | C.C.S.D. Ill. | reversed |

== See also ==
- Certificate of division
