= Coffin v. United States =

- Supreme Court of the United States

Argued December 6 – December 7, 1894 Decided March 4, 1895
- Full case name: Coffin, et al. v. United States
- Citations: 156 U.S. 432 (more) 15 S. Ct. 394; 39 L. Ed. 481

Holding
- It is the duty of the judge, in all jurisdictions, when requested, and in some when not requested, to explain the presumption of innocence to the jury in his charge. The usual formula in which this doctrine is expressed is that every man is presumed to be innocent until his guilt is proved beyond a reasonable doubt.

Court membership
- Chief Justice Melville Fuller Associate Justices Stephen J. Field · John M. Harlan; Horace Gray · David J. Brewer; Henry B. Brown · George Shiras Jr. Howell E. Jackson · Edward D. White

Case opinion
- Majority: White, joined by unanimous

Coffin v. United States, 156 U.S. 432 (1895), was an appellate case before the United States Supreme Court in 1895 which established the presumption of innocence of persons accused of crimes in a landmark decision.

F. A. Coffin and Percival B. Coffin, plaintiffs in error, and A. S. Reed had been charged with aiding and abetting the former president of the Indianapolis National Bank, Theodore P. Haughey, in misdemeanor bank fraud between January 1, 1891, and July 26, 1893.

It is a complex case with a 50-count indictment. The most interesting aspect is commentary by the Court regarding presumption of innocence. In the decision, the Court then goes on to detail the complete legal history of presumed innocence.

== See also ==
- List of United States Supreme Court cases, volume 156
