= Fuller Court =

Period of the US Supreme Court from 1888 to 1910

Supreme Court of the United States
Fuller Court
- Waite Court ← → White Court
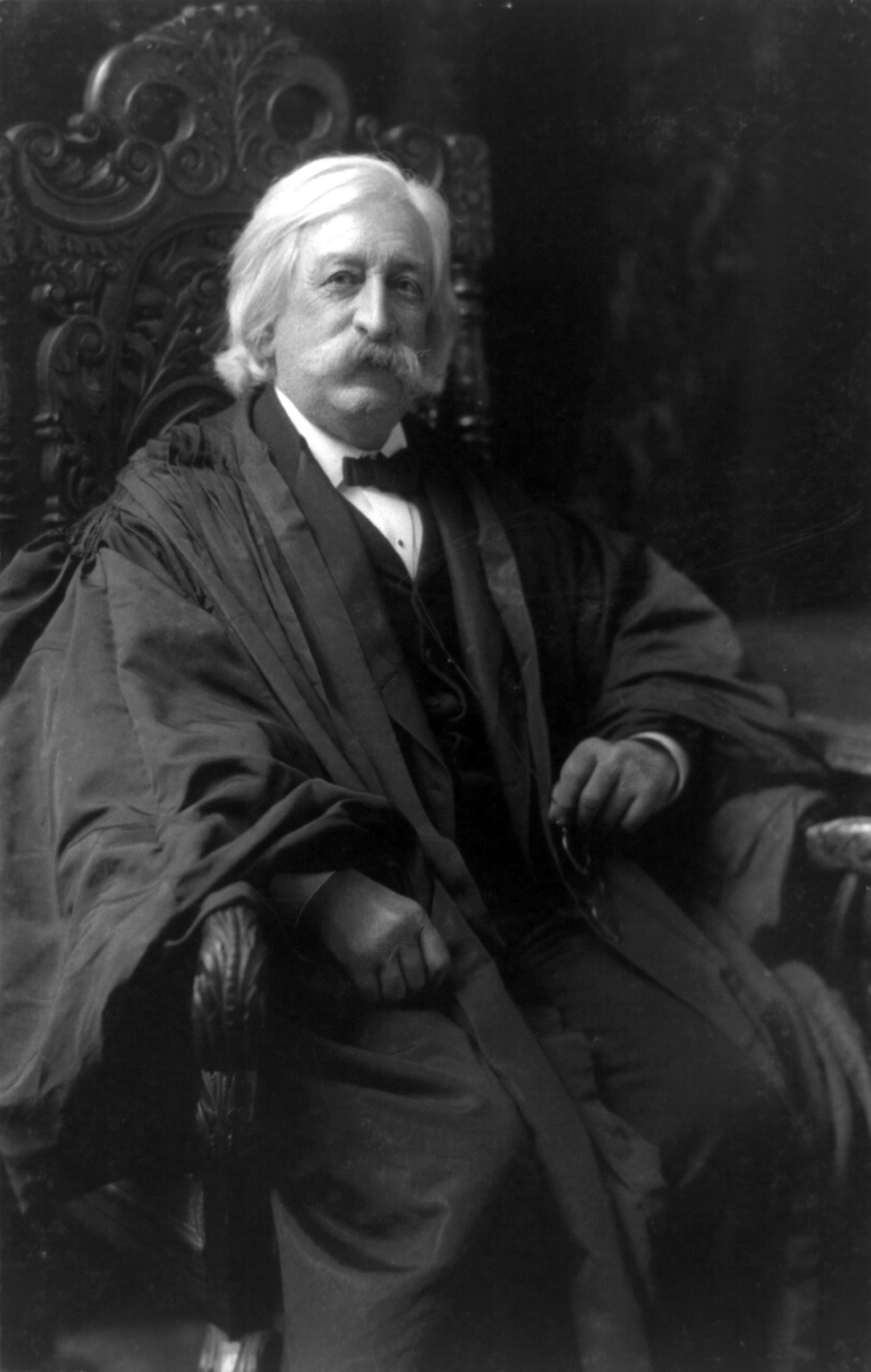
- Chief Justice Melville Fuller
- October 10, 1888 – July 4, 1910 (21 years, 267 days)
- Seat: Old Senate Chamber; Washington, D.C.
- No. of positions: 9
- Fuller Court decisions

The Fuller Court refers to the Supreme Court of the United States from 1888 to 1910, when Melville Fuller served as the eighth Chief Justice of the United States. Fuller succeeded Morrison R. Waite as Chief Justice after the latter's death, and Fuller served as Chief Justice until his death, at which point Associate Justice Edward Douglass White was nominated and confirmed as Fuller's replacement.

During the era of the Fuller Court, the Judiciary Act of 1891 was passed, easing the burden of the Supreme Court by creating the United States courts of appeals. The Fuller Court was the first of three consecutive conservative courts, and established the Lochner era.

== Membership ==
The Fuller court began in October 1888, when the Senate confirmed President Grover Cleveland's nomination of Melville Fuller as the successor to Chief Justice Waite. On Fuller's accession to the office, the Fuller Court consisted of associate justices: Samuel Freeman Miller, Stephen Johnson Field, Joseph P. Bradley, John Marshall Harlan, Stanley Matthews, Horace Gray, Samuel Blatchford, and Lucius Quintus Cincinnatus Lamar II – who had taken office earlier that year.

Matthews, Miller, and Bradley all died between 1889 and 1892, and President Benjamin Harrison appointed David Josiah Brewer, Henry Billings Brown, and George Shiras Jr. to replace them. Lamar and Blatchford both died in 1893, and President Harrison appointed Howell Edmunds Jackson while President Cleveland appointed Edward Douglass White as their replacements. White was Cleveland's third nominee to the seat that had been held by Blatchford, following the Senate's rejections of William B. Hornblower and Wheeler Hazard Peckham. Jackson died in 1895, and was replaced by another Cleveland appointee, Rufus Wheeler Peckham, brother of Wheeler Peckham.

Field retired in 1897, and was replaced by Attorney General Joseph McKenna, the lone appointment made by William McKinley. Gray died in 1902 and Shiras retired in 1903; President Theodore Roosevelt successfully nominated Oliver Wendell Holmes Jr. and William R. Day to replace them. Brown retired in 1906, and Roosevelt appointed William Henry Moody to the court. Peckham died in 1909 and was succeeded by Horace Harmon Lurton, an appointee of President William Howard Taft.

After Fuller's death, Fuller was replaced as Chief Justice by Associate Justice Edward Douglass White, who was elevated by President Taft. Between the death of Fuller and the elevation of White, Charles Evans Hughes joined the court as the successor to David Josiah Brewer, who died in 1910. Moody also retired in 1910, shortly before the elevation of White due to a prolonged illness.

=== Timeline ===
Bar key:
Lincoln appointee Grant appointee Hayes appointee Garfield appointee Arthur appointee Cleveland appointee B. Harrison appointee McKinley appointee T. Roosevelt appointee Taft appointee

== Other branches ==
Presidents during this court included Grover Cleveland (two non-consecutive terms), Benjamin Harrison, William McKinley, Teddy Roosevelt, and William Howard Taft. Congresses during this court included 50th through the 61st United States Congresses.

== Rulings of the Court ==
Major rulings of the Fuller Court include:

- Chae Chan Ping v. United States (1889): In a decision written by Justice Field, the court upheld the Scott Act (an addendum to the Chinese Exclusion Act), holding that Congress has broad powers in setting immigration policy.
- Pollock v. Farmers' Loan & Trust Co. (1895): In a 5–4 decision written by Chief Justice Fuller, the court struck down the Income Tax of 1894. The court ruled that the dividend, interest, and rent taxes levied by the act were unconstitutional because they constituted direct taxes that were not apportioned by state population. The court's ruling was effectively overturned by the Sixteenth Amendment.
- United States v. E. C. Knight Co. (1895): In a decision written by Chief Justice Fuller, the court blocked the government's attempt to use the Sherman Antitrust Act to prevent the American Sugar Refining Company's acquisition of E.C. Knight Co. The court ruled that manufacturing is an intrastate activity, and thus could not be regulated by the federal government.
- Plessy v. Ferguson (1896): In a 7–1 decision written by Justice Brown, the court declared that racial segregation does not violate the Equal Protection Clause so long as the "separate but equal" doctrine is followed. The decision allowed the continued existence of Jim Crow laws. Plessy was overruled by Brown v. Board of Education in 1954, and the Civil Rights Act of 1964 outlawed racial discrimination by the government.
- Allgeyer v. Louisiana (1897): In a decision written by Justice Peckham, the court established that the Due Process Clause created protections for freedom of contract. The case marked the beginning of the Lochner era, during which the court struck down numerous economic regulations.
- Chicago, Burlington & Quincy Railroad Co. v. City of Chicago (1897): In a decision written by Justice Harlan, the court held that the Fourteenth Amendment had incorporated the Takings Clause against state governments. This was the first case that incorporated a clause from the Bill of Rights, though further incorporation did not take place until the 1920s.
- United States v. Wong Kim Ark (1898): In a 7–2 decision written by Justice Gray, the court held that the Citizenship Clause had established birthright citizenship even for those whose parents are not American citizens. Under Elk v. Wilkins (1884), the decision did not apply to Native Americans.
- The Insular Cases (1901): In a series of cases dealing with territories acquired in the Spanish–American War, the court held that the Constitution does not fully extend to unincorporated territories such as Puerto Rico.
- Lone Wolf v. Hitchcock (1903): In a decision written by Justice White, the court ruled that the federal government has the power to unilaterally breach treaties made with Native American tribes. The decision allowed the federal government to take land from Native American tribes without providing compensation.
- Swift & Co. v. United States (1905): In a unanimous decision written by Justice Holmes, the court upheld the government's regulation of the "Beef Trust" under the Sherman Antitrust Act.
- Lochner v. New York (1905): In a 5–4 decision written by Justice Peckham, the court held that a state setting a maximum workweek of 60 hours for bakeries violated freedom of contract. The Lochner Era would continue until West Coast Hotel Co. v. Parrish (1937).
- Hodges v. United States (1906): In a 7–2 decision written by Justice Brewer, the court held that the Thirteenth Amendment does not authorize Congress to protect labor rights from racially motivated attacks such as whitecapping. Jones v. Alfred H. Mayer Co. (1968) later overturned the case.
- Adair v. United States (1908): In a decision written by Justice Harlan, the court struck down part of the Erdman Act and declared that bans on "yellow-dog contracts" (which forbid employees from joining unions) are unconstitutional. The court held that such bans unconstitutionally infringed on freedom of contract. The decision was largely superseded by the Norris–La Guardia Act of 1932.
- Loewe v. Lawlor (1908): In a unanimous decision written by Chief Justice Fuller, the court held that the Sherman Antitrust Act prevents the use of secondary boycotts by unions. The Norris–La Guardia Act effectively overturned this decision.
- Bobbs-Merrill Co. v. Straus (1908): In a unanimous decision written by Justice Day, the court established the first-sale doctrine.
- Ex parte Young (1908): In a decision written by Justice Peckham, the court held that lawsuits against state officials in federal court do not violate sovereign immunity.

== Judicial philosophy ==
In contrast with the Waite Court, the Fuller Court used the Due Process Clause to strike down several economic regulations in defense of a laissez faire economy. The court struck down several federal regulatory laws and sought to maintain the autonomy of the states, but it also struck down state laws that it saw as impediments to interstate commerce. The Fuller Court ruled more favorably to the government in other cases, most notably Plessy, and granted the government wide latitude in administering colonial territories. The court also declined to extend due process protections into the sphere of criminal procedure. Like many other courts prior to 1941, the Fuller Court had strong consensual norms, which helped to keep the number of dissents to a minimum. No clear ideological blocs emerged during Fuller's tenure, but Justices Holmes, Day, Gray, and Brown tended to favor upholding laws, and Justices Shiras, Harlan, White, and Peckham were the most willing to overrule state legislatures. Justice Harlan was notable for his many dissents, earning him the moniker of the "Great Dissenter." The ideological homogeneity was a product of an era in which Republican agendas predominated, and even the lone Democratic president (Cleveland) shared the pro-business views of most Republicans. Fuller himself was regarded as a talented administrator generally in agreement with the court's philosophy, but not a dominant intellectual force.

== Gallery ==
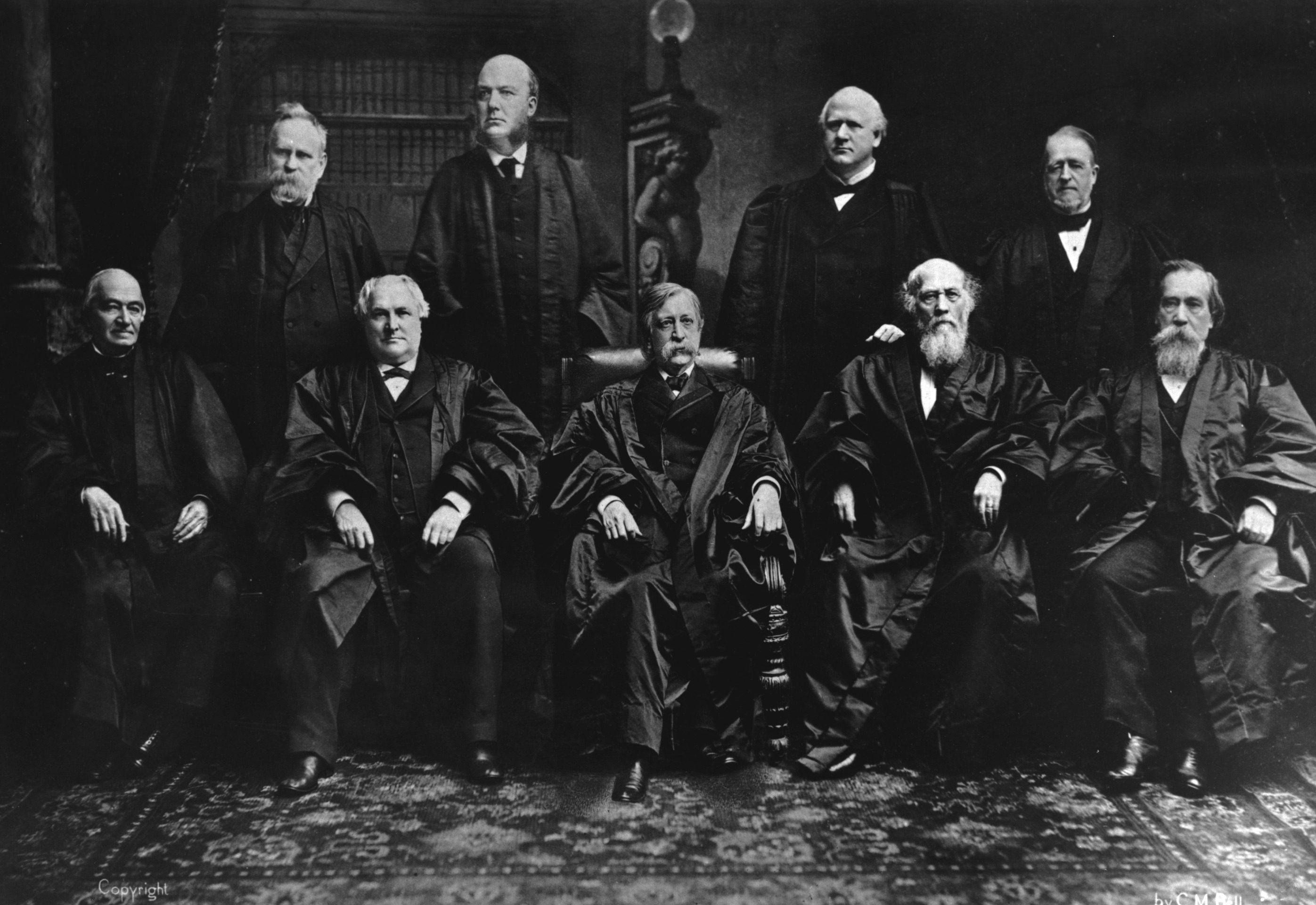
Fuller Court
(October 8, 1888 – March 22, 1889)

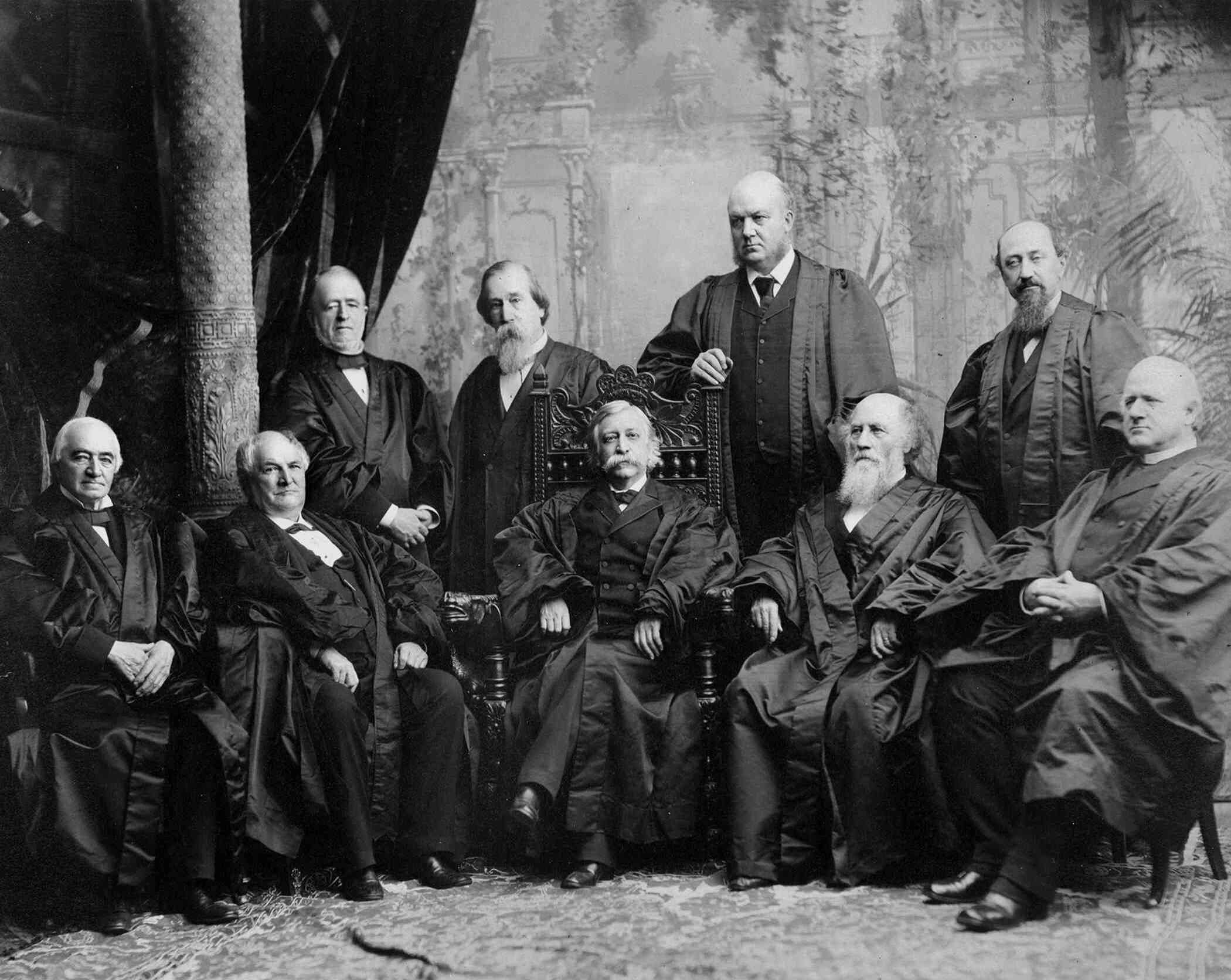
Fuller Court
(January 6, 1890 – October 13, 1890)

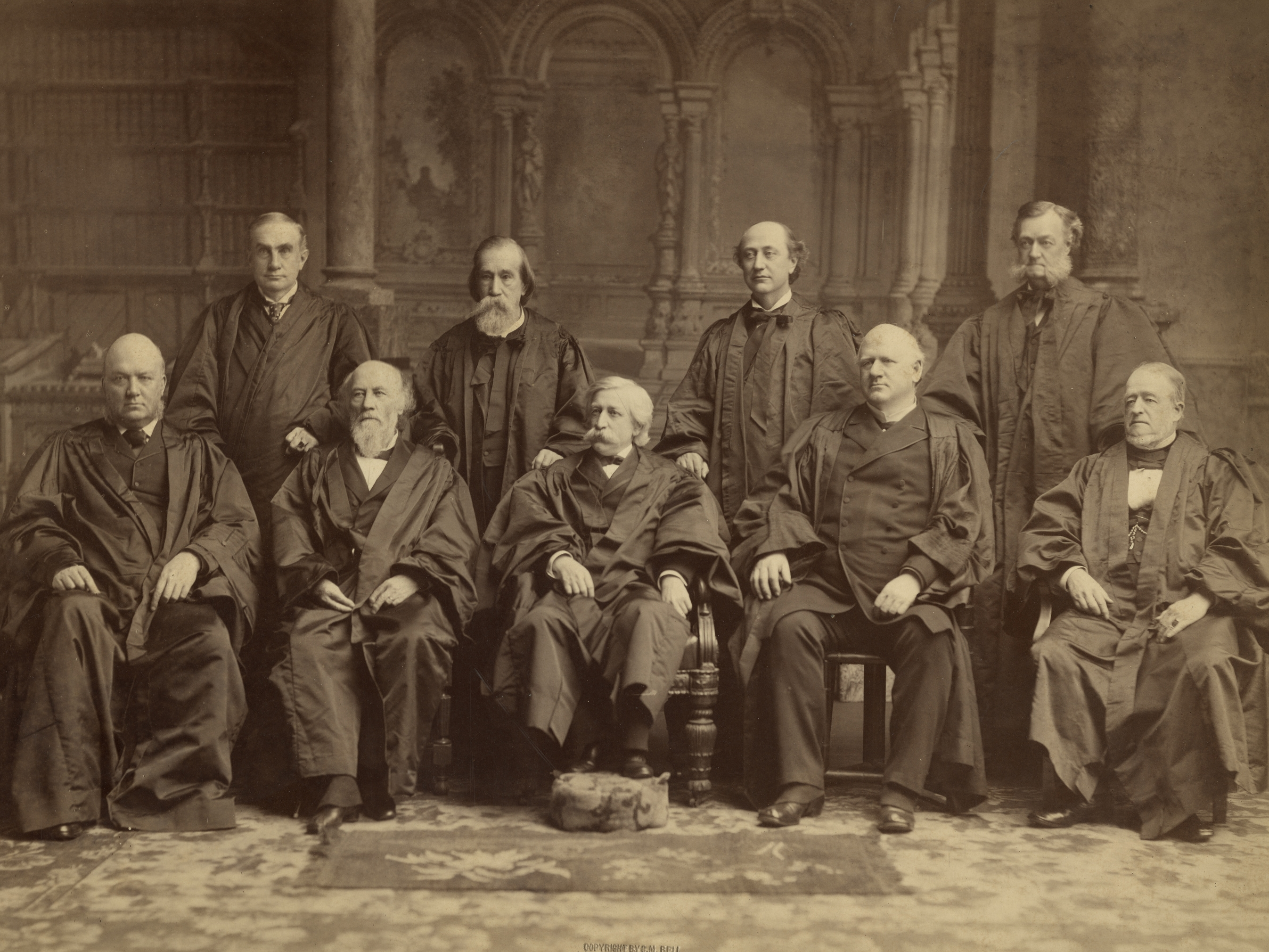
Fuller Court
(October 10, 1892 – January 23, 1893)

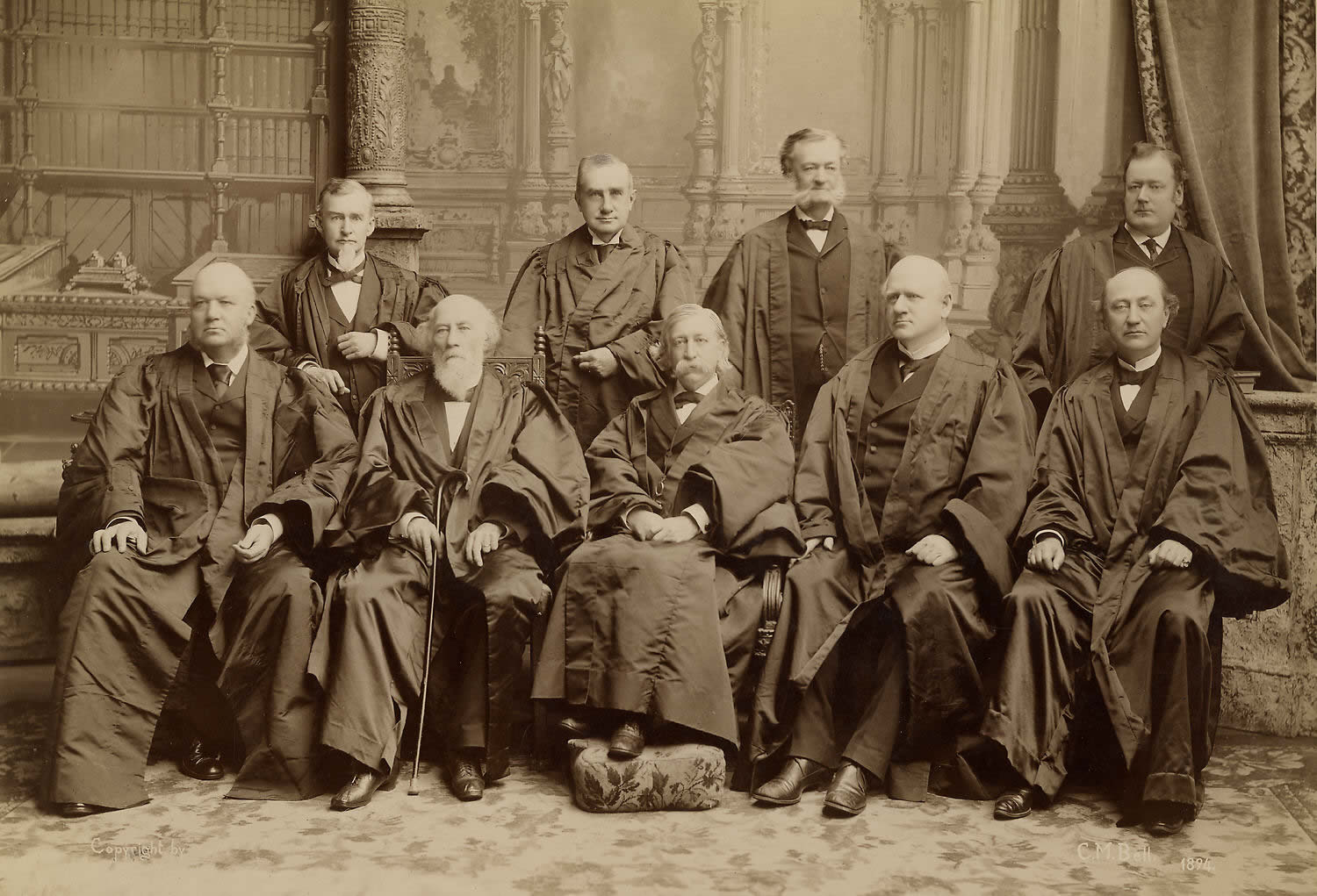
Fuller Court
(March 12, 1894 – August 8, 1895)

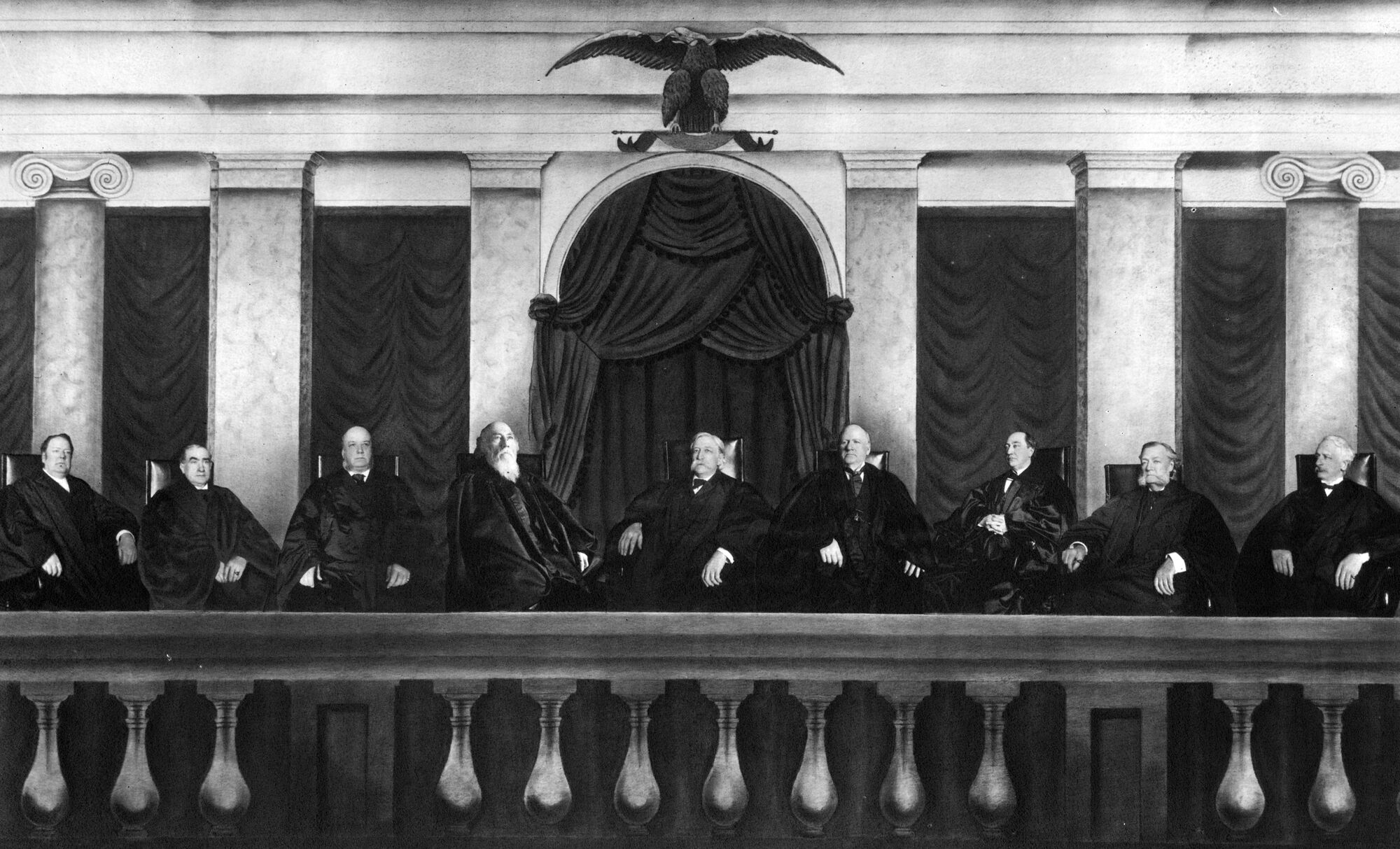
Fuller Court
(January 6, 1896 – December 1, 1897)

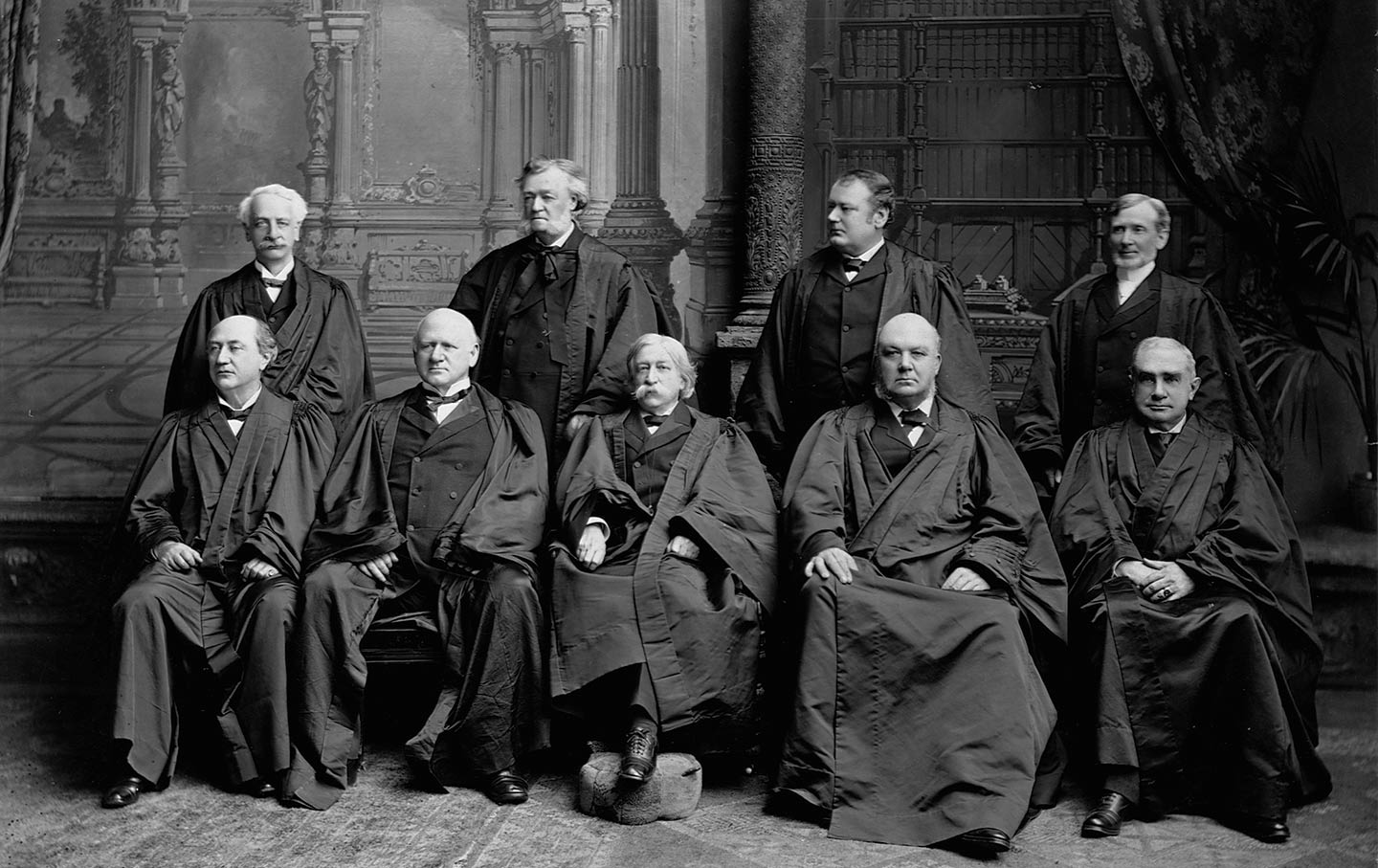
Fuller Court
(January 26, 1898 – September 15, 1902)

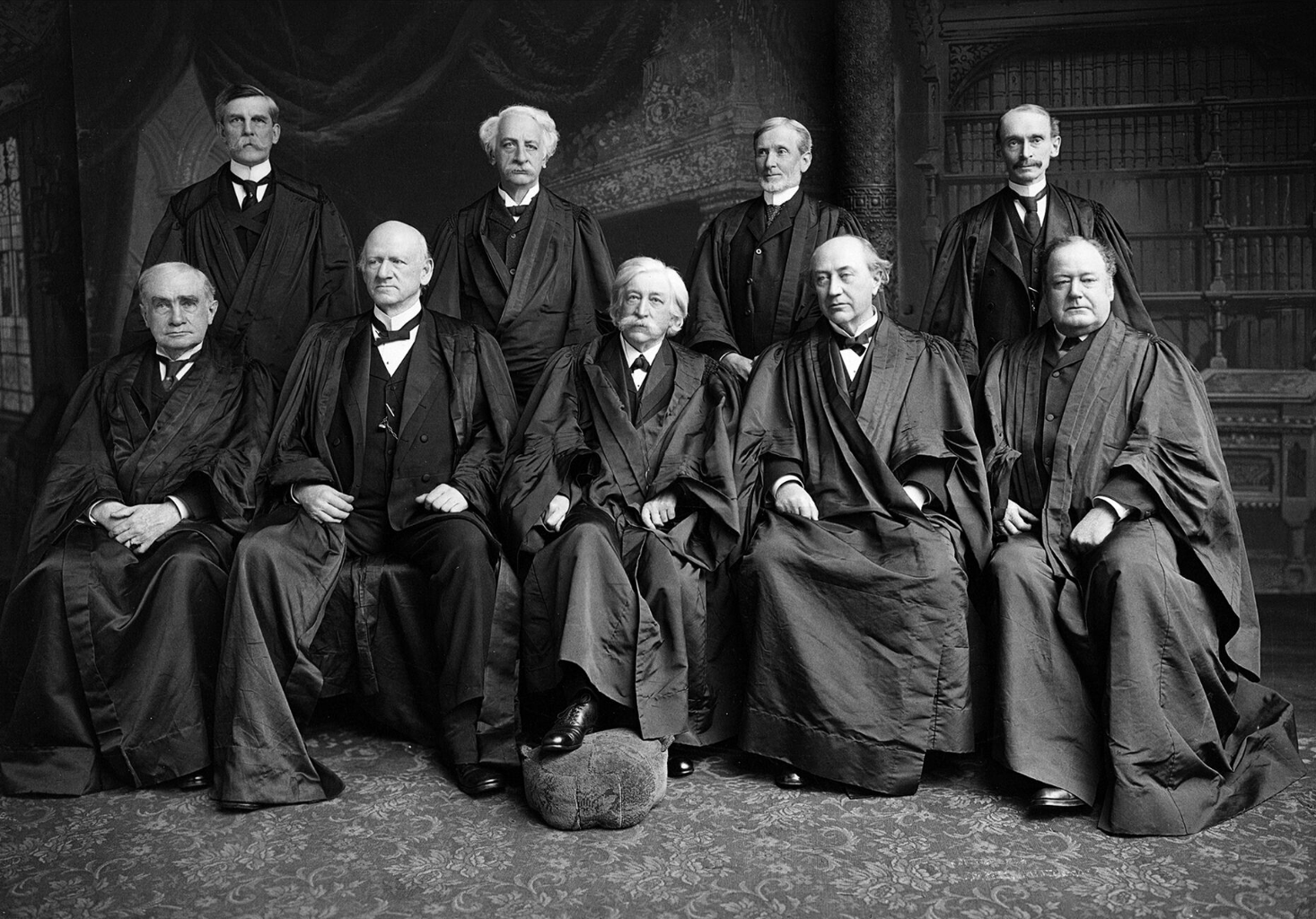
Fuller Court
(March 2, 1903 – May 26, 1906)

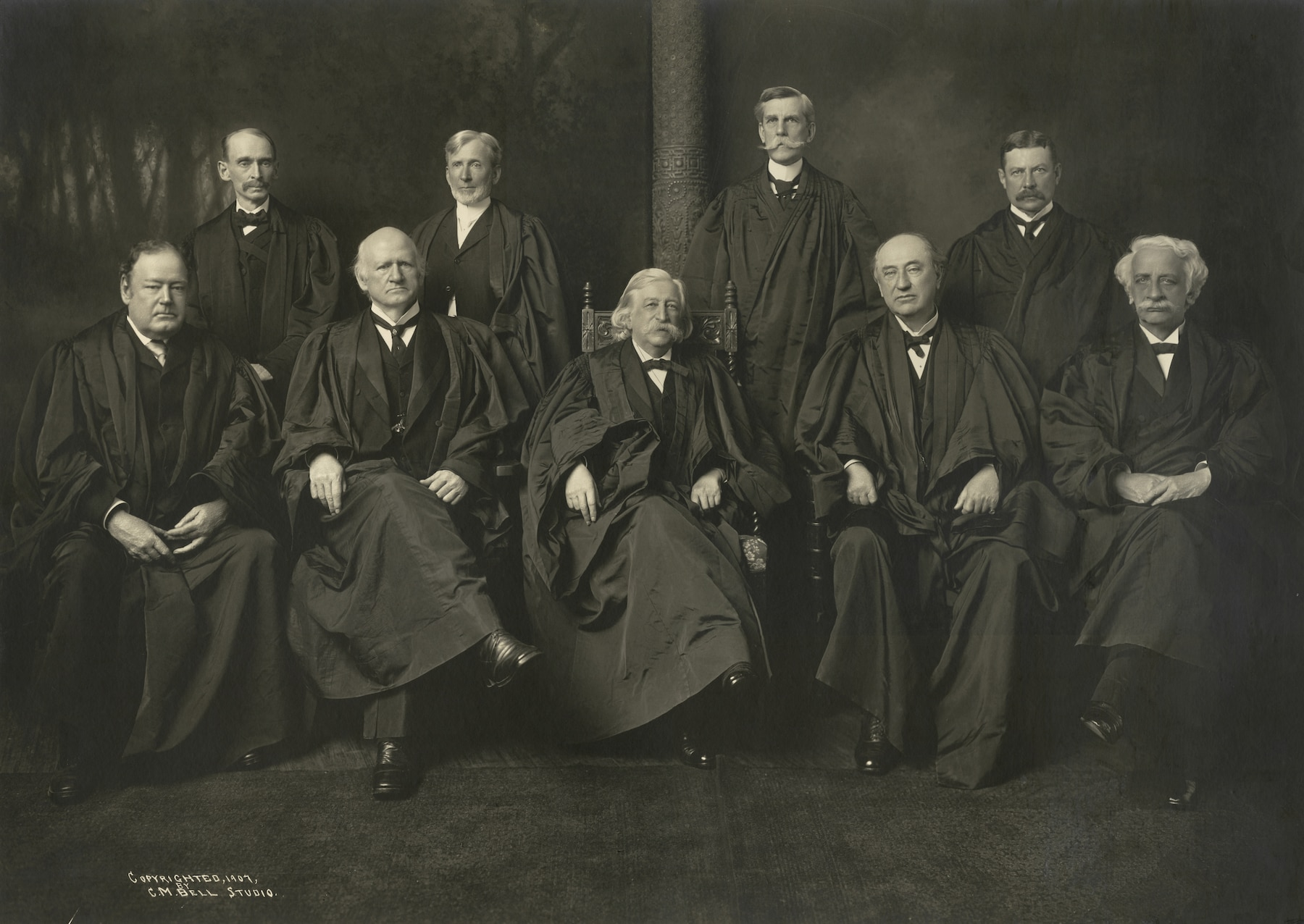
Fuller Court
(December 17, 1906 – October 24, 1909)
