= Reagan v. Farmers' Loan & Trust Co. =

United States Supreme Court case

- Supreme Court of the United States

Argued April 4–5, 1894 Decided May 28, 1894
- Full case name: Reagan v. Farmers' Loan & Trust Co.
- Citations: 154 U.S. 362 (more)

Court membership
- Chief Justice Melville Fuller Associate Justices Stephen J. Field · John M. Harlan; Horace Gray · David J. Brewer; Henry B. Brown · George Shiras Jr. Howell E. Jackson · Edward D. White

Case opinion
- Majority: Brewer

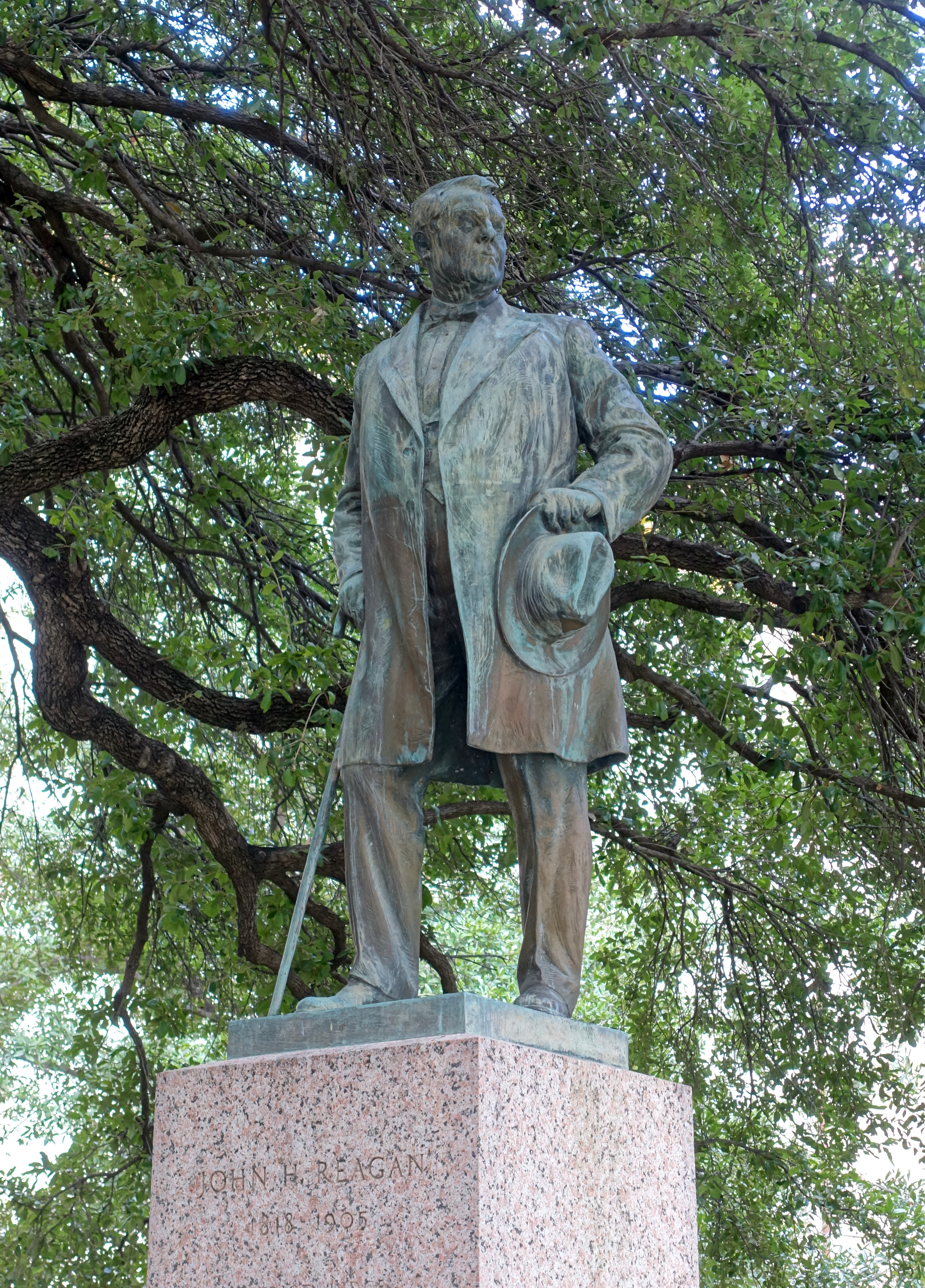
Statue of John H Reagan, a Texas Railroad Commissioner involved in the case.

Reagan v. Farmers Loan & Trust Co. was a United States Supreme Court legal case that was submitted to the court on March 23, 1893, took place in 1894, and is revered in the history of American constitutional law. The case involved a challenge to the constitutionality of the Railroad Commission Act of Texas, which established a commission with the power to regulate railroad rates and practices in the state. The case included the Farmers' Loan and Trust Company, a financial institution that held bonds issued by the Houston and Texas Central Railroad Company, as the plaintiff and Texas railroad commissioners, John H. Reagan, W. P. McLean, and L. L. Foster, the attorney general of the state of Texas, C. A. Culberson, The International & Great Northern Railroad Company and Thomas N. Campbell as the defendants. Farmers Loan & Trust company sued Texas railroad commissioners, the attorney general of the states of Texas, The International & Great Northern Railroad Company, and Thomas N. Campbell because they had recognized that the rates and regulations that were set forth by the Texas Railroad company were unconstitutional. The case was decreed in favor of the plaintiff, the Farmers’ Loan and Trust Company.

== Background ==
The situation began on April 3, 1891, when legislation from the state of Texas passed an act that established a branch of railroad commissioners with the sole purpose of creating a more fair system of taxing the railroad companies. Section 1. of this bill specified that there must be qualifications from three people in order to constitute a commission. The second section was put in place for organizing the commissions. The third section outlines the powers and duties the Railroad Commission of Texas holds regarding the regulation of railroad freight and passenger tariffs. It grants the commission the power and duty to adopt the necessary rates, charges, and regulations to govern railroad tariffs, enforce penalties of noncompliance, and prevent unjust extortion in rates. The commission is also tasked with classifying and subdividing all freight and property that may be transported over railroads in the state and fixing reasonable rates for each class or subdivision for each railroad subject to the act. According to Section 3 of the act, the commission is also responsible for making reasonable rates for the transportation of passengers and for all other services performed by any railroad subject to the act. All of the following sections of the bill specified procedure and rules for the Commission. Through this new act, the Texas Railroad Company had been granted the right to regulate railroad freight and passenger tariffs. The act would also prevent discrimination within the rates they charged. The suit focused largely on the abuse of power on behalf of the Texas Railroad Commission, by way of the authority they were given to regulate rates and enforce penalties for non-compliance.

== Overview ==
During Reagan v. Farmers Loan & Trust Co. on April 4–5, 1894, Farmer’s Loan & Trust Company argued that the Commission's regulatory power violated the company's constitutional rights arguing that it violated the Due Process Clause of the Fourteenth Amendment to the United States Constitution by depriving the company of its property without due process of law. The company claimed that the law allowed the commission to set rates that were unreasonably low and thus deprived the company of its right to earn a reasonable return on its investment. They additionally sued in pursuit of stopping the enforcement of penalties for not abiding by these rules and regulations.

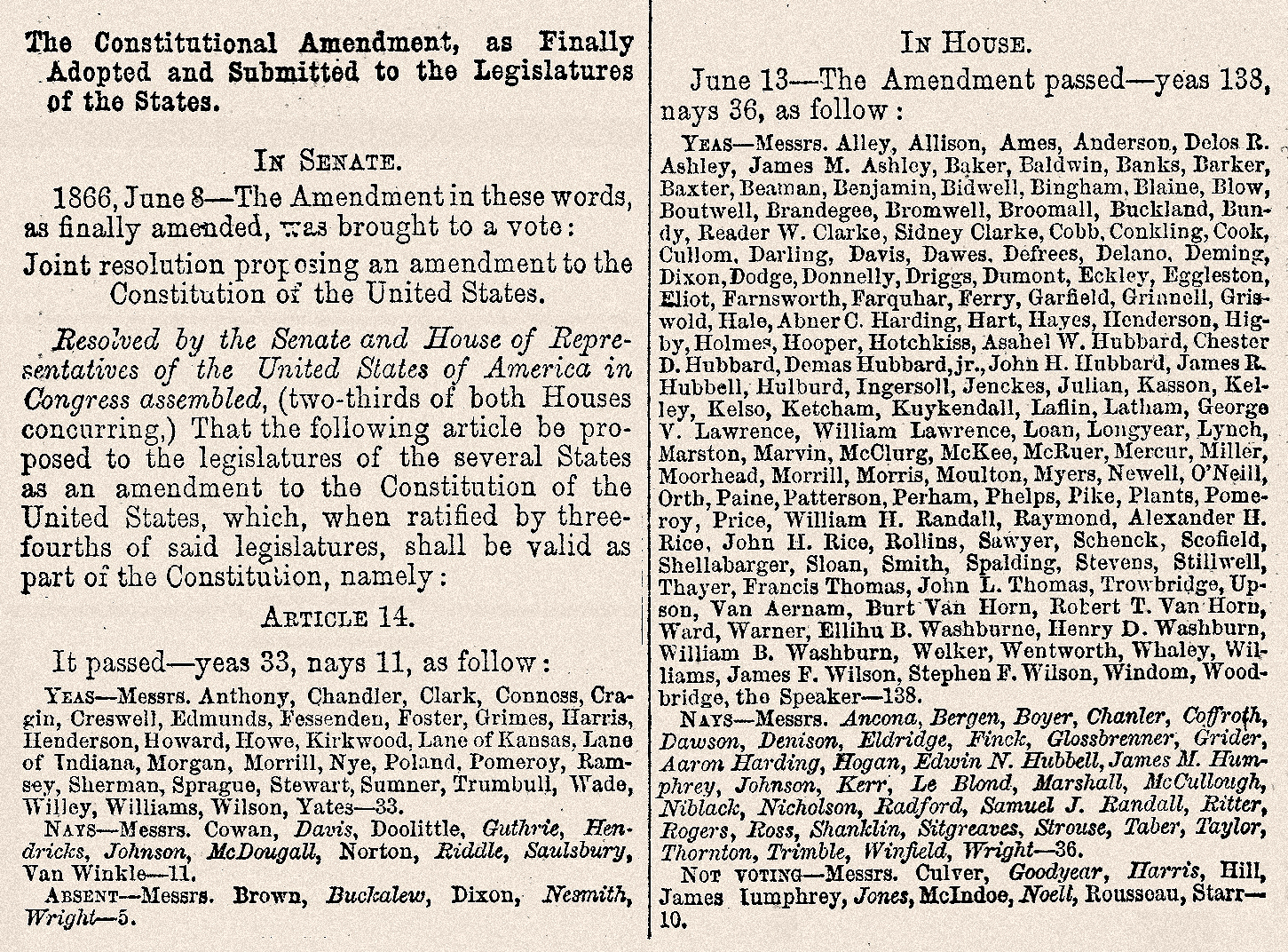
The Fourteenth Amendment

One of the key elements of the Court's decision was its distinction between the regulatory power of the Commission and the power of the courts to review the Commission's decisions. The Court held that while the Commission was granted the power to regulate rates by the Court, the Court was not authorized to establish rates itself or to prevent the Commission from establishing rates. Instead, the Court held that it was within the power of a court of equity to review how reasonable the rates established by the Commission are and to enjoin the Commission if they were found to be unjust or unreasonable. The court can only restrain the enforcement of rates it deems unlawful; it cannot set rates on its own.

Overall, the Reagan v. Farmers' Loan and Trust Co. case upheld the constitutionality of state regulation of railroads and established the principle that state regulatory bodies could set rates for railroads as long as those rates were not unreasonably low and parties had the means to challenge them in court. Ultimately, the Supreme Court didn’t see any abuse of power from the Texas Railroad Commission and decided to uphold the law as constitutional and the case was dismissed.

The Court's decision in Reagan v. Farmers' Loan and Trust Co. has been cited as a precedent in numerous subsequent cases involving the constitutionality of state regulations of various industries, including utilities, transportation, and telecommunications. The case is also notable for its impact on the development of administrative law, which governs the relationship between regulatory agencies and the businesses they regulate. Overall, Reagan v. Farmers' Loan and Trust Co. stands as a landmark case in the history of American constitutional law, and continues to be studied and cited by legal scholars and practitioners alike. The case serves as a reminder of the importance of constitutional protections and the limitations of regulatory bodies in their exercise of power.

== Before Reagan v. Farmers' Loan & Trust Co. ==
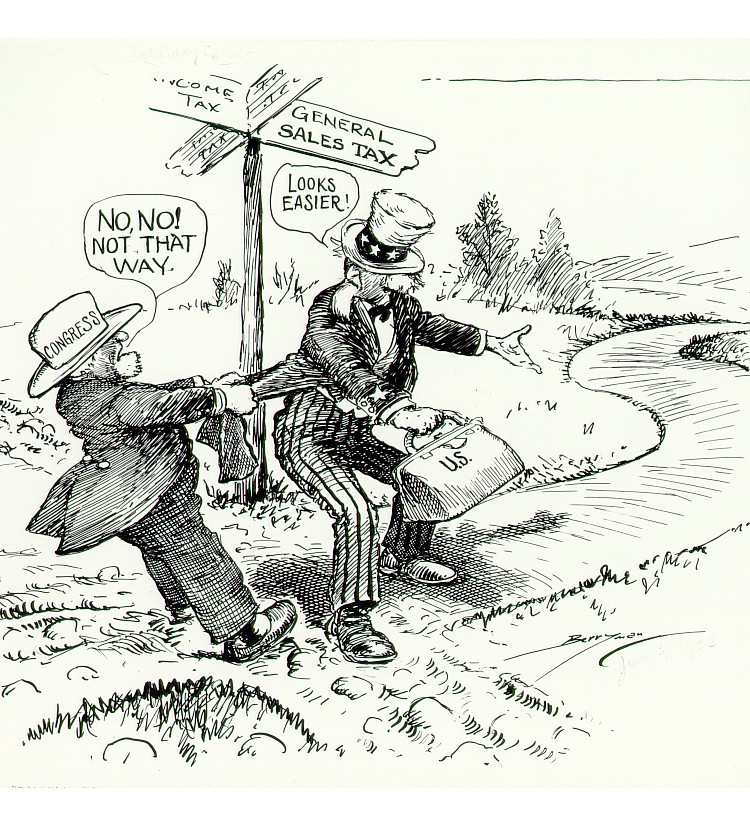
Political cartoon from the early 1890s discussing taxation systems commonly used before the Texas Railroad Commission Act of 1891

Before the Texas Railroad Commission Act of 1891 was passed, the method in which railroads were taxed was completely different and faced major criticism. The way these railroads used to be assessed for taxations would be based strictly on their property value and this included all of the assets of these companies. This was the basis for many railroad companies purposely undervaluing their property in order to avoid paying as much taxes as they would be expected to pay for the true value of their property. The intention of the Texas Railroad Commission act created a more fair and just system for all railroads to be regulated under the same governing body. The commission was given powers by the government and the ability to regulate taxations and they were expected to be a fair mediator and to fight against discrimination of any kind within the industry. Another big change that was introduced with this new act was that these businesses began to be taxed on their incomes rather than their property value which caused a massive shift in the way the industry was run. Over time the Texas Railroad Commission began to stretch far beyond simply managing railroad taxations. The commission also began to monitor the safety of railroad companies, develop alternative energy sources, regulate the local oil industry and enforce rules within the industry among other branches of work. The commission has done a lot for these leading industries in the state of Texas and has been fundamental in creating a more fair and safe community within these industries.

== Ruling of the Supreme Court ==
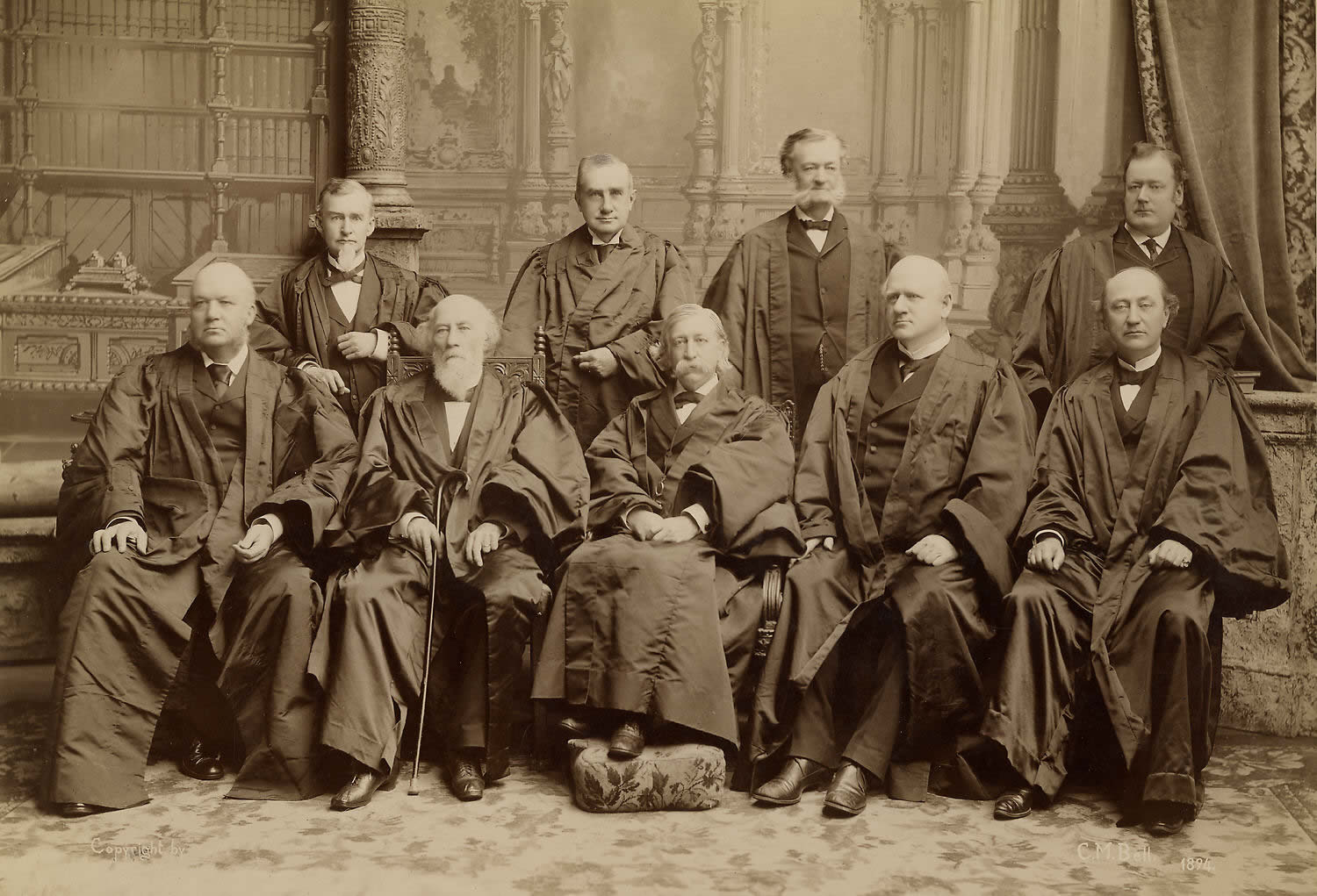
Supreme Court Justices over the Reagan v. Farmers' Loan and Trust Co. trial

The decisions issued in this cause are made perpetual. The International and Great Northern Railroad Company were enjoined from putting or continuing in effect the rates, tariffs, circulars, or orders of the Railroad Commission of Texas, or either or any of them, and from charging or continuing to charge the rates specified in said tariffs, circulars, or orders, or either or any of them. The Railroad Commission of Texas and its members, as well as the Attorney General of the State of Texas and his successors in office, were perpetually prohibited from instituting or authorizing or directing any suit or suits, action or actions, against the defendant railroad company for the recovery of any penalties under the act of the Legislature of the State of Texas approved April 3, 1891. The Railroad Commission of Texas and its members were also are further restrained from certifying or delivering copies of any of the orders, tariffs, or circulars to the Attorney General or any other party. The Railroad Commission of Texas and its members were perpetually prohibited from making, issuing, or delivering to the said railroad company, or causing to be made, issued, or delivered to it, any further tariffs, circulars, orders. All other individuals, persons, or corporations were also perpetually restrained from instituting or prosecuting any suits against the said railroad company for the recovery of any damages, overcharges, or penalties, under the act or any of its provisions or under and by virtue of the said tariffs, orders, or circulars of the Railroad Commission of Texas. All rates, tariffs, circulars, and orders previously made and issued by the Railroad Commission of Texas were declared unreasonable, unfair, and unjust as to complainant and cross-complainant, and they are cancelled and declared null. All costs were taxed against the defendants Reagan, McLean, Culberson, and Foster, and the Railroad Commission of Texas. The Railroad Commission and the Attorney General appealed the decree to the Supreme Court.
