= Swift & Co. v. United States =

- Supreme Court of the United States

Argued January 6, 9, 1905 Decided January 30, 1905
- Full case name: Swift & Co. v. United States
- Citations: 196 U.S. 375 (more) 25 S. Ct. 276; 49 L. Ed. 518; 1905 U.S. LEXIS 908

Holding
- The Commerce Clause allows the federal government to regulate monopolies if it has a direct effect on commerce.

Court membership
- Chief Justice Melville Fuller Associate Justices John M. Harlan · David J. Brewer; Henry B. Brown · Edward D. White; Rufus W. Peckham · Joseph McKenna; Oliver W. Holmes Jr. · William R. Day

Case opinion
- Majority: Holmes, joined by unanimous

Laws applied
- Commerce Clause

Swift & Co. v. United States, 196 U.S. 375 (1905), was a case in which the United States Supreme Court ruled that the Commerce Clause allowed the federal government to regulate monopolies if it has a direct effect on commerce. It marked the success of the Presidency of Theodore Roosevelt in destroying the "Beef Trust". This case established a "stream of commerce" (or "current of commerce") argument that allows Congress to regulate things that fall into either category. In particular it allowed Congress to regulate the Chicago slaughterhouse industry. Even though the slaughterhouse supposedly dealt with only intrastate matters, the butchering of meat was merely a "station" along the way between cow and meat. Thus, as it was part of the greater meat industry that was between the several states, Congress can regulate it. The Court's decision halted price fixing by Swift & Company and its allies.

== Details ==
The case originated in 1902 when President Theodore Roosevelt directed his Attorney General Philander Knox to bring a lawsuit against the "Beef Trust" on antitrust grounds using the Sherman Antitrust Act of 1890. The evidence at trial demonstrated that the "Big Six" leading meatpackers were engaged in a conspiracy to fix prices and divide the market for livestock and meat in their quest for higher prices and higher profits. They blacklisted competitors who failed to go along, used false bids, and accepted rebates from the railroads. The six companies involved were Swift, Armour, Morris, Cudahy, Wilson and Schwartzchild. Together, they did $700 million a year in business and controlled half of the national market, and up to 75% in New York City.

When they were hit with federal injunctions in 1902, the Big Six agreed to merge into one National Packing Company in 1903 to continue to control the trade internally. The case was heard by the Supreme Court in 1905, shortly after it struck down a similar consolidation and the Northern Securities case of 1904. Speaking for the court, Oliver Wendell Holmes Jr. broadened the meaning of "interstate" commerce by including actions that were part of the chain where the chain was clearly interstate in character. In this case, the chain ran from farm to retail store and crossed many state lines.

The federal government's victory in the case encouraged it to pursue other antitrust actions. Public opinion, outraged by Upton Sinclair's novel The Jungle, which depicted horribly unsanitary conditions in Chicago's meatpacking plants, supported the decision. Congress followed by passing in 1906 both the Pure Food and Drug Act and the Meat Inspection Act.

== Aftermath ==
Following the decision, US meatpacking companies expanded into South America, in particular Argentina where they continued to engage in cartel behavior, causing a decline in cattle prices but increase in meat prices.

== See also ==
- United States v. E. C. Knight Co. (1895)
- Skidmore v. Swift & Co. (1944)
