= Owen M. Fiss =

American legal scholar (born 1938)

- Born: 1938 (age 87–88); New York City, U.S.
- Education: Dartmouth College (BA); University of Oxford (BPhil); Harvard University (LLB)
- Scientific career
- Fields: Constitutional law
- Workplaces: Yale University

Owen M. Fiss (born 1938) is an American legal scholar who is a Sterling Professor emeritus at Yale Law School.

== Biography ==
Born in the Bronx, N.Y., Fiss received his B.A. degree from Dartmouth College in 1959, B.Phil. from Oxford University in 1961, and LL.B. from Harvard Law School in 1964.

After graduation from law school, Fiss was admitted to the bar in New York state in 1965. He clerked for U.S. Court of Appeals Judge Thurgood Marshall from 1964 to 1965, and for U.S. Supreme Court Justice William Brennan in 1965. He then worked as a Special Assistant to Assistant Attorney General of the Civil Rights Division of the Department of Justice from 1966 to 1968.

Fiss joined the faculty of University of Chicago in 1968, and became a professor at Yale Law School in 1976.

Courses offered by Fiss include civil procedure, distributive justice, the law of democracy and the First Amendment.

Brian Leiter's law school ratings rank Owen Fiss as one of the top 20 most-cited professors in constitutional law.

== Works ==
- The Civil Rights Injunction, 1978
- Troubled Beginnings of the Modern State, 1888-1910, 1993
- Liberalism Divided, 1996
- The Irony of Free Speech, 1996
- A Community of Equals, 1999
- A Way Out: America's Ghettos and the Legacy of Racism, 2003
- The Law As It Could Be, 2003
- A War Like No Other: The Constitution in a Time of Terror, 2015
- Pillars of Justice, 2017

== Awards ==
- American Philosophical Society's Henry M. Phillips prize (2020)

== See also ==
- List of law clerks for the third seat of the Supreme Court of the United States
