= David J. Brewer =

US Supreme Court justice from 1890 to 1910

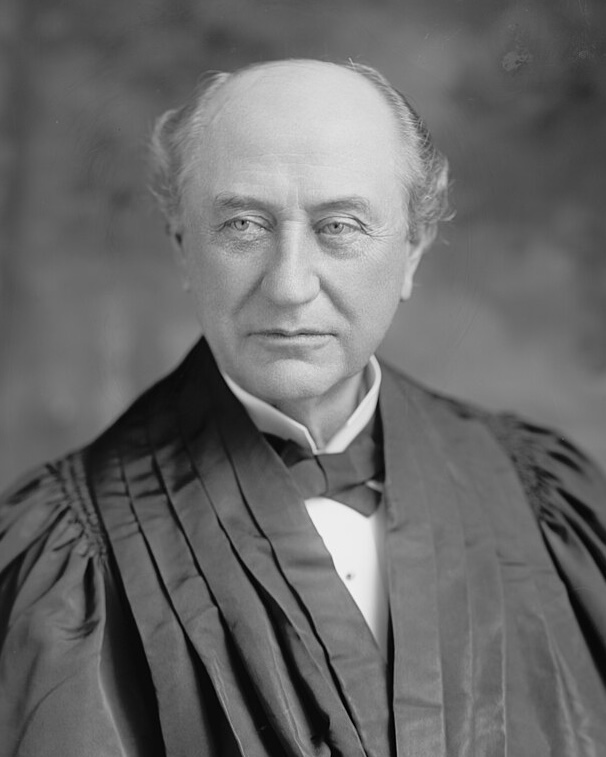
- Justice Brewer, c. 1910

Associate Justice of the Supreme Court of the United States
- In office January 6, 1890 – March 28, 1910
- Nominated by: Benjamin Harrison
- Preceded by: Stanley Matthews
- Succeeded by: Charles Evans Hughes

Judge of the United States Circuit Court for the Eighth Circuit
- In office March 31, 1884 – December 18, 1889
- Nominated by: Chester A. Arthur
- Preceded by: George W. McCrary
- Succeeded by: Henry Clay Caldwell

Justice of the Kansas Supreme Court
- In office January 9, 1871 – April 8, 1884
- Preceded by: Jacob Safford
- Succeeded by: Theodore A. Hurd

Personal details
- Born: June 20, 1837 Smyrna, Ottoman Empire (now İzmir, Turkey)
- Died: March 28, 1910 (aged 72) Washington, D.C., U.S.
- Party: Republican
- Spouses: Louise Landon (m. 1861; died 1898) Emma Mott (m. 1901)
- Children: 4
- Education: Wesleyan University; Yale College (BA); Albany Law School (LLB)

Military service
- Allegiance: United States
- Branch/service: Union Army
- Rank: Second lieutenant
- Unit: Kansas Home Guard: Lane's Rifles
- Battles/wars: American Civil War

David Josiah Brewer (June 20, 1837 – March 28, 1910) was an American jurist who served as an associate justice of the Supreme Court of the United States from 1890 to 1910. An appointee of President Benjamin Harrison, he supported states' rights, opposed broad interpretations of Congress's power to regulate interstate commerce, and voted to strike down economic regulations that he felt infringed on the freedom of contract. He and Justice Rufus W. Peckham were the "intellectual leaders" of the Fuller Court, according to the legal academic Owen M. Fiss. Brewer has been viewed negatively by most scholars, though a few have argued that his reputation as a reactionary deserves to be reconsidered.

Born in Smyrna (modern-day İzmir, Turkey) to Congregationalist missionaries, Brewer attended Wesleyan University, Yale University, and Albany Law School. He headed west and settled in Leavenworth, Kansas, where he practiced law. Brewer was elected to a county judgeship in 1862; he later served as judge of Kansas's First Judicial District and as the county attorney for Leavenworth County. In 1870, he was elected to the Kansas Supreme Court, where he served for fourteen years, participating in decisions on segregation, property rights, women's rights, and other issues. President Chester A. Arthur appointed him as a federal circuit judge in 1884. When Justice Stanley Matthews of the Supreme Court of the United States died in 1889, President Benjamin Harrison nominated Brewer to succeed him. Despite some objections from prohibitionists, the U.S. Senate voted 53–11 to confirm Brewer, and he took the oath of office on January 6, 1890.

Brewer opposed governmental interference in the free market and rejected the Supreme Court's decision in Munn v. Illinois (1877), which had upheld the states' power to regulate businesses, writing: "The paternal theory of government is to me odious." He joined the majority in decisions such as Lochner v. New York (1905), in which the Court invoked the doctrine of substantive due process to strike down a New York labor law. Brewer was not uniformly hostile to regulations, however; his majority opinion in Muller v. Oregon (1908) sustained an Oregon law that set maximum working hours for female laborers. He joined the majority to strike down the federal income tax in Pollock v. Farmers' Loan & Trust Co. (1895), and, writing for the Court in the case of In re Debs (1895), he expanded the judiciary's equitable authority by upholding an injunction against the organizers of a strike. He favored a narrow interpretation of the Sherman Antitrust Act in United States v. E. C. Knight Co. (1895), but he cast the deciding vote in Northern Securities Co. v. United States (1904) to block a corporate merger on antitrust grounds.

Brewer generally ruled against African-Americans in civil rights cases, although he consistently voted in favor of Chinese immigrants. He opposed imperialism and, in the Insular Cases, rejected the idea that the Constitution did not apply in full to the territories. His majority opinion in Church of the Holy Trinity v. United States (1892) contained a frequently criticized claim that the United States "is a Christian nation". Off the bench, he was a prolific public speaker who decried Progressive reforms and criticized President Theodore Roosevelt. He advocated for peace and served on an arbitral commission that resolved a boundary dispute between Venezuela and the United Kingdom. He remained on the Supreme Court until his death in 1910.

== Early life ==
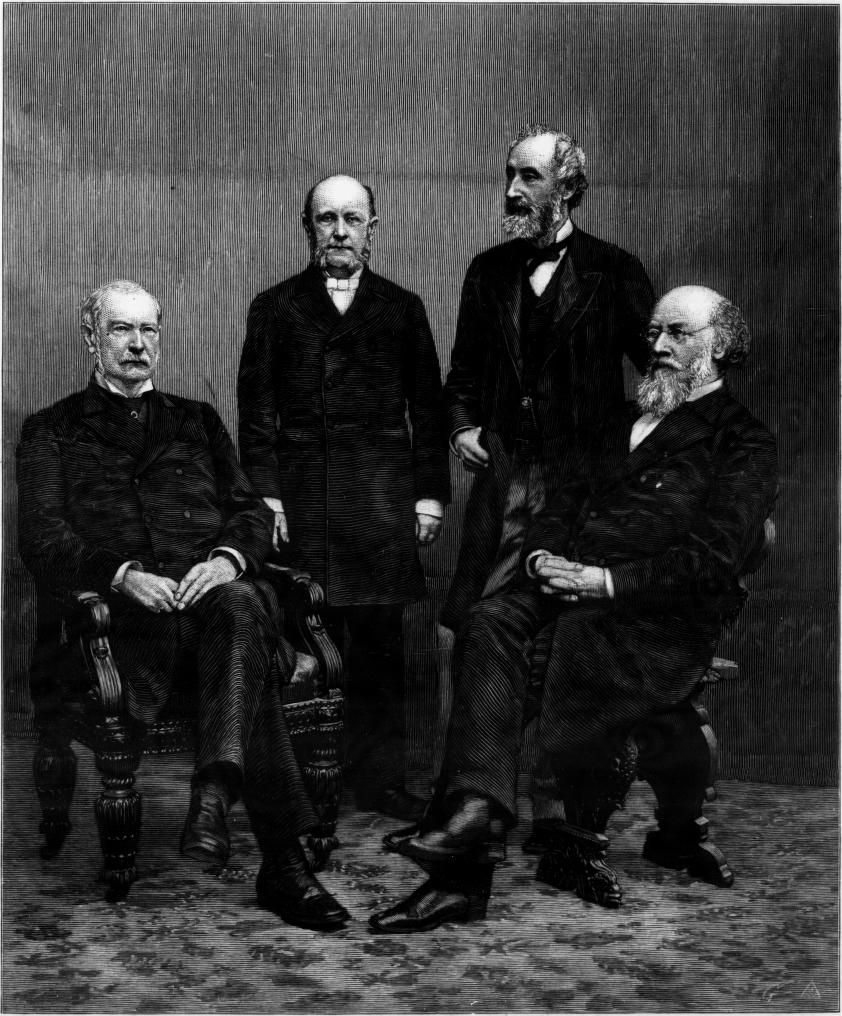
Brewer's four well-known uncles. From left to right: David Dudley Field, Henry M. Field, Cyrus W. Field, and Stephen J. Field.

David Josiah Brewer was born on June 20, 1837, in Smyrna (modern-day İzmir, Turkey), which was at the time a part of the Ottoman Empire. He was the fourth child of Josiah Brewer, a Massachusetts-born Congregationalist missionary to the Mediterranean, and his wife Emilia A. Field, a member of the prominent Field family whose brothers included David Dudley Field (a well-known attorney), Stephen J. Field (a justice of the U.S. Supreme Court), Cyrus W. Field (who developed the Transatlantic telegraph cable), and Henry M. Field (a clergyman). The family returned to the United States in 1838; the elder Brewer pastored several congregations in New England and served as the chaplain of a Connecticut state penitentiary.

When Brewer was fifteen years old, he enrolled at Wesleyan University in Connecticut. At Wesleyan, he joined the Peithologian literary society and a group known as the Mystical Seven. Brewer transferred to Yale two years later; he took classes in political philosophy, the U.S. Constitution, Hebrew, mathematics, theology, and other topics. His classmates included Henry Billings Brown, who later served with him on the Supreme Court, and Chauncey Depew, a future senator. Brewer expressed interest in politics during his college years, and he wrote numerous forceful letters to the editor, including a fiery denunciation of the Supreme Court's Dred Scott decision. One Yale classmate recalled that the future justice had a reputation for "jumping up on the slightest provocation to make a speech, especially on political lines". Brewer graduated from Yale in 1856, receiving an A.B. degree with honors.

Upon his graduation, Brewer moved to New York City, where he read law in the office of his uncle David Dudley Field. After a year, he enrolled at Albany Law School, from which he received an LL.B. degree in 1858. Brewer pondered whether to remain in New York with his uncle David or to move to California to work with his uncle Stephen, but he eventually rejected both options, declaring: "I don't want to grow up to be my uncle's nephew." He moved to Kansas City, Missouri; after practicing law there for a few months, he joined the Pike's Peak gold rush and headed west in search of fortune. Having found no gold, he settled in Leavenworth, Kansas Territory, a city of about ten thousand that was both a center of regional commerce and the home of several notable figures in Kansas's legal community.

== Career ==
After a short period of work at a law firm in Leavenworth, Brewer began a legal practice of his own with a partner. In 1861, he was appointed commissioner of the U.S. Circuit Court for the District of Kansas, an administrative position in which he issued warrants and completed paperwork. He continued to practice law, and he served as a second lieutenant in the "Lane Rifles," a Union Home Guard, during the Civil War. In 1862, after unsuccessfully seeking the Republican nomination for a seat in the state legislature, he hesitantly accepted a nomination to be the party's candidate for judge of Leavenworth County's criminal and probate courts. Although he was only twenty-five years old, he won the election. As a judge, Brewer punished criminals harshly; despite his inexperience, he quickly gained a reputation as a competent jurist. Having been urged by several local attorneys to run, Brewer sought and won election in 1864 as judge of the First Judicial District of Kansas, which encompassed Leavenworth and Wyandotte counties. In that position, he held a general in contempt of court and ruled that a man who was one-quarter black had the right to vote. Brewer was elected county attorney in 1868, serving until 1870; he also resumed the private practice of law.

=== Kansas Supreme Court (1870–1884) ===
In 1870, the state's Republicans unexpectedly nominated Brewer instead of incumbent Justice Jacob Safford for a seat on the Kansas Supreme Court. In the heavily Republican state, Brewer won the general election handily; he was easily reelected in 1876 and 1882. According to Brian J. Moline, his opinions on the state Supreme Court, "while well within the conventions of the time, exhibit an individualistic, even progressive, instinct". In a landmark women's rights decision in Wright v. Noell, (Note: 16 Kan. 601 (1876)) he ruled in favor of a woman who had been elected to serve as county superintendent of public instruction, reversing a lower court's holding that she was ineligible to serve. Brewer rendered rulings that were sympathetic to Native Americans, and he emphasized the best interests of the child in child custody cases.

In Board of Education v. Tinnon, (Note: 26 Kan. 1 (1881)) Brewer dissented when the court held that the city of Ottawa, Kansas, could not lawfully segregate its schools. Justice Daniel M. Valentine's opinion for a 2–1 majority concluded that local school boards had no authority beyond the powers expressly given to them by state law; since state law did not expressly authorize school boards to create separate schools for blacks and whites, he determined that segregation in Ottawa was not permissible. In what the law professor Andrew Kull characterized as an "angry dissent", Brewer disagreed. He maintained that school boards could act without explicit authorization from the legislature, and he also argued that racial segregation did not violate the Fourteenth Amendment to the U.S. Constitution, writing that "each State has the power to classify school children by color, sex, or otherwise, as to its legislature shall seem wisest and best". In his biography of Brewer, the historian Michael J. Brodhead maintained that the justice's reasoning was "not overtly racist" and rested instead on his longstanding support for local self-governance; the legal scholar Arnold M. Paul, by contrast, argued that the opinion exhibited "an insensitivity to social problems ... combined with a simplistic legal formalism".

According to Paul, cases in the 1880s involving Kansas's prohibition of alcohol "mark the decisive turning points in Brewer's shift to hard-line conservatism". In State v. Mugler, (Note: 29 Kan. 252 (1883)) a brewer challenged a state law that forbade the manufacture of beer, arguing that it deprived him of his property without due process of law. The court ruled against him on the basis that the law fell within the state's police power. Although Brewer did not formally dissent, he expressed his reservations about the majority's conclusions, suggesting that the law in effect deprived the brewer of his property without just compensation. (Mugler appealed to the U.S. Supreme Court, but in Mugler v. Kansas, (Note: 123 U.S. 623 (1887)) it ruled that the prohibition law was constitutional.) Brewer's opinion in Mugler presaged the protective attitude toward property rights that he later displayed on the U.S. Supreme Court.

=== Eighth Circuit (1884–1889) ===
When Judge John F. Dillon resigned in 1879, several state officials encouraged President Rutherford B. Hayes to nominate Brewer to the ensuing vacancy on the federal circuit court for the Eighth Circuit. George W. McCrary was appointed instead, but when McCrary resigned in 1884, President Chester A. Arthur nominated Brewer to take his place. Brewer characterized the Eighth Circuit as "an empire in itself": it encompassed Arkansas, Colorado, Iowa, Kansas, Minnesota, Missouri, and Nebraska, to which North Dakota, South Dakota, and Wyoming were added several years after his appointment. As a circuit judge, he heard a wide variety of cases, including federal civil disputes, matters arising under the court's diversity jurisdiction, and the occasional criminal prosecution. Most cases were under the circuit court's original jurisdiction, although Brewer heard a few appeals from federal district courts.

In Chicago & N.W. Railway Co. v. Dey, (Note: 35 F. 866 (C.C.S.D. Iowa 1888)) a railroad company argued that the rates set by the Iowa Railroad Commission were unreasonable and should be enjoined. Despite the Supreme Court's 1877 decision in Munn v. Illinois (Note: 94 U.S. 113 (1877)) that legislatures had the authority to determine whether rates were reasonable, Brewer ruled in the railroad's favor, issuing a preliminary injunction on the grounds that it was unlawful to impose rates that did not adequately compensate the company. Paul argued that the decision was squarely at odds with Munn, although Brodhead maintained that such claims are "at the very least misleading" since Brewer later lauded the commission and upheld the rates. In State v. Walruff, (Note: 26 F. 178 (C.C.D. Kan. 1886)) Brewer firmly reiterated the position that he had expressed in Mugler, appealing to "the guarantees of safety and protection to private property" to rule that the Fourteenth Amendment required Kansas to compensate beer manufacturers affected by prohibition laws. Citing Walruff and other cases, Paul commented that the future justice's "growing conservatism" was evident during this period.

== Supreme Court nomination ==
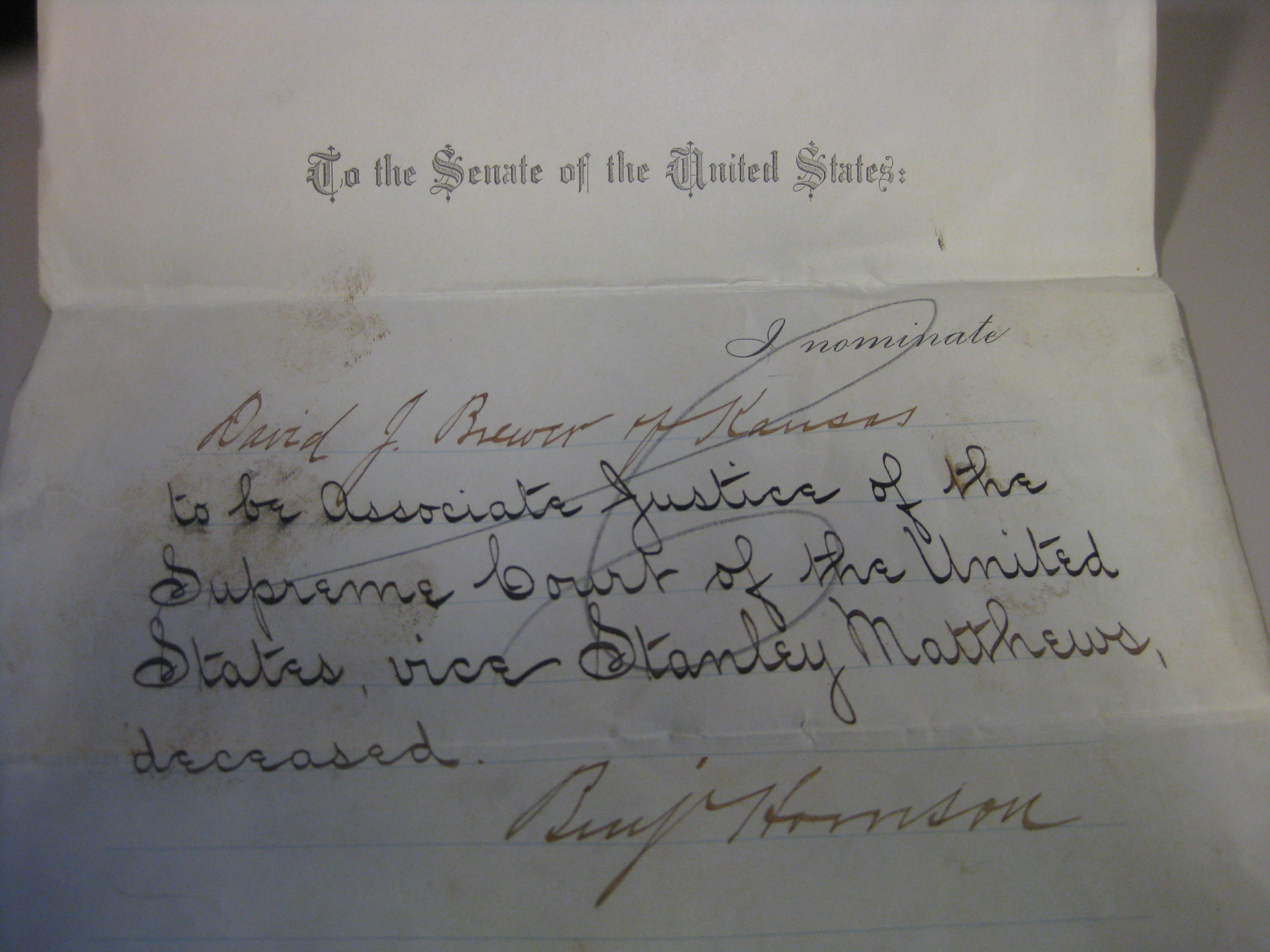
Brewer's Supreme Court nomination

Justice Stanley Matthews's death in March 1889 created a vacancy on the U.S. Supreme Court for President Benjamin Harrison to fill. It took Harrison nearly nine months to select a nominee, during which time he considered forty candidates. Politicians from Matthews's home state of Ohio, including Governor Joseph Foraker, urged him to appoint the prominent Cincinnati attorney Thomas McDougall; after McDougall declined to be considered, Foraker lent his support to William Howard Taft, who was then a municipal judge in Cincinnati. Other candidates suggested to Harrison included the Detroit attorney Alfred Russell, whom Vice President Levi P. Morton endorsed, and McCrary, who was favored by many Midwestern politicians and jurists. Harrison eventually narrowed the field to two candidates, both of whom were conservative Republicans from the Midwest: Brewer—who had the vigorous support of Senator Preston B. Plumb of Kansas and Chief Justice Albert H. Horton of the Kansas Supreme Court—and Henry Billings Brown, a federal judge from Michigan who was endorsed by several of that state's prominent political figures. During the selection process, a letter came to Harrison's attention in which Brewer suggested that Brown—his friend and former classmate at Yale—should be appointed instead of him. Harrison was reputedly so impressed by Brewer's unselfishness that he decided to nominate him to the Court.

Harrison announced his selection of the surprised Brewer on December 4, 1889, sending the nomination to the Senate. Prohibitionists, maintaining that Brewer's opinion in Walruff was "conclusive proof of what we already fear—the total surrender to the liquor dealers of the country", expressed opposition, but the selection was otherwise viewed favorably. The Senate Judiciary Committee, chaired by George F. Edmunds, considered the nomination for a week, longer than usual; despite some criticism, its members endorsed Brewer's nomination. The full Senate, in a secret session that The New York Times characterized as "absurd", heard prolonged speeches from several members who opposed the nominee on the grounds that he was hostile to prohibition or partial toward the railroad interests. Brewer was confirmed on December 18, 1889, by a vote of 53–11, and he took the oath of office on January 6, 1890.

== Supreme Court (1890–1910) ==
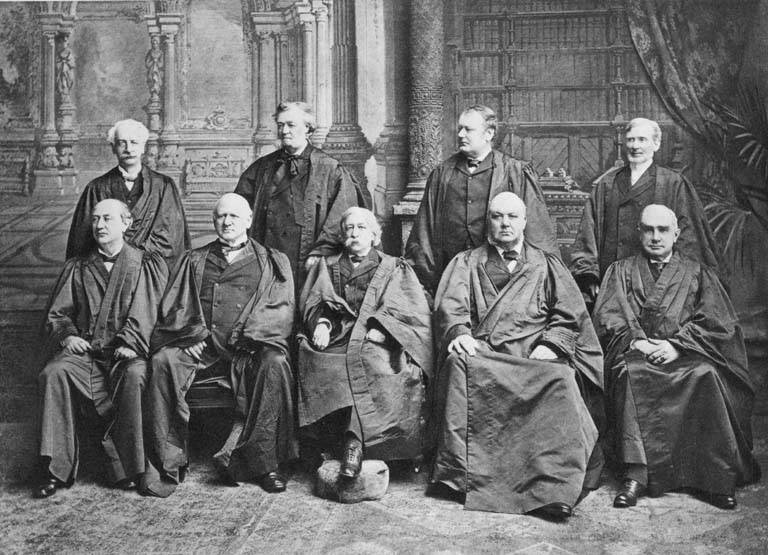
Supreme Court justices, 1899. Brewer is in the bottom row, first from the left.

Brewer remained on the Court for twenty years, serving until his death in 1910. In the 4,430 cases in which he participated, he wrote 539 majority or plurality opinions, 65 dissenting opinions, and 14 concurring opinions. Melville Fuller was chief justice throughout Brewer's tenure; the Fuller Court has been described as mainly loyal to business interests and laissez-faire economic principles, although late-twentieth-century revisionist scholars have rejected that narrative. Brewer has often been described as an extremely conservative justice. According to Paul, he "held to a strictly conservative, sometimes reactionary, position on the Court, opposing firmly the expansion of government regulatory power, state or federal" and making "little pretense of 'judicial self-restraint' and few compromises to Court consensus". Some scholars argued in the 1990s that Brewer's jurisprudence was less extreme than generally thought, contending that his reputation as a reactionary was based largely on a small and unrepresentative sample of his comments and opinions. While accepting that "Brewer can fairly be labeled a conservative", the legal scholar J. Gordon Hylton wrote in 1994 that "to say that he was a self-conscious defender of the interests of corporate America or an enthusiastic disciple of laissez-faire is both unfair and inaccurate".

Brewer held an activist conception of the judicial role. His constitutional views were shaped by his religious beliefs, and he emphasized natural justice in his written opinions. According to the legal scholar Owen M. Fiss, Brewer and his "constant ally" Rufus W. Peckham were the "intellectual leaders" of the Fuller Court—justices who, while not always in the majority, were "influential within the dominant coalition and the source of the ideas that gave the Court its sweep and direction". Brewer's views were also aligned with those of his uncle—Justice Stephen J. Field—a staunch defender of property rights with whom he served for eight years. Brewer supported states' rights and felt that the judiciary should limit governmental actions that interfere with the free market, although the legal historian Kermit L. Hall writes that his jurisprudence "was not altogether predictable" because "[h]is Congregational, missionary, and anti-slavery roots" gave him "a sympathetic ear for the disadvantaged".

=== Substantive due process ===
Brewer and his fellow conservative justices led the Court toward rulings that interpreted the Due Process Clauses of the Fifth and Fourteenth Amendments broadly to protect property rights from various regulations. Three months after his appointment, he joined the majority in Chicago, Milwaukee & St. Paul Railway Co. v. Minnesota, (Note: 134 U.S. 418 (1890)) a case in which the Court struck down the railroad rates set by a Minnesota commission. The decision, which endorsed the idea that the Due Process Clause contained a substantive component that limited state regulatory authority, was at odds with the Court's holding in Munn that rate-setting was a matter for legislators, not judges, to decide. Strenuously dissenting in Budd v. New York, (Note: 143 U.S. 517 (1892)) Brewer derided Munn as "radically unsound" and, using a phrase that according to Brodhead "has ever since linked his name to opposition to reform", wrote: "The paternal theory of government is to me odious." His opinion for a unanimous Court in Reagan v. Farmers' Loan & Trust Co. built on the Chicago, Milwaukee decision, curtailing Munn and asserting that the judiciary could review the reasonableness of railroad rates. He joined the majority in Allgeyer v. Louisiana, (Note: 165 U.S. 578 (1897)) the first case to deploy the liberty of contract doctrine; the decision held that the Due Process Clause protected the right to make contracts.

The era of substantive due process reached its zenith in the 1905 case of Lochner v. New York. (Note: 198 U.S. 45 (1905)) Lochner involved a New York law that capped hours for bakery workers at sixty hours a week. In a decision widely viewed to be among the Supreme Court's worst, a five-justice majority held the law to be unconstitutional under the Due Process Clause. Brewer joined the Court's opinion, which was written by Peckham; it maintained that due process included a right to enter labor contracts without being subject to unreasonable governmental regulation. Peckham rejected the state's argument that the law was intended to protect workers' health, citing the "common understanding" that baking was not unhealthy. He maintained that bakers could protect their own health, arguing that the law was in fact a labor regulation in disguise. The decision provoked a now-famous dissent from Justice Oliver Wendell Holmes Jr., who accused the majority of substituting its own economic preferences for the requirements of the Constitution. Brewer voted to strike down labor laws in other cases, such as Holden v. Hardy, (Note: 169 U.S. 366 (1898)) which involved a maximum-hour law for miners, and Adair v. United States, (Note: 208 U.S. 161 (1908)) which voided a federal law against yellow-dog contracts.

According to Hylton, the common view that Brewer uniformly opposed regulations is inaccurate.Maintaining that "Brewer's bark proved to be worse than his bite", he observes that the justice voted to uphold state regulatory action in nearly eighty percent of cases. When an Oregon law that kept female employees of factories and laundries from working more than ten hours a day was challenged in the 1908 case of Muller v. Oregon, (Note: 208 U.S. 412 (1908)) Brewer wrote the Court's unanimous opinion upholding it. He favorably cited an extensive brief filed by Louis Brandeis (the Brandeis brief) that, using statistics and other evidence, argued that the law was appropriate as a matter of public policy. In an opinion that has been condemned as patronizing toward women, Brewer argued that Oregon's law was different from the one at issue in Lochner because female workers were in special need of protection due to their "physical structure and the performance of maternal functions", which put them "at a disadvantage in the struggle for subsistence". In other cases, he voted to uphold labor regulations involving seamen and those performing hazardous work, and he disfavored attempts to invoke the freedom-of-contract doctrine in cases that did not pertain to employment. Addressing the justice's reasons for upholding some regulations while invalidating others, Hylton comments that "Brewer 'knew an unconstitutional use of the police power when he saw one', but he was never able to define precisely what made it so".

=== Federal power ===
==== Taxation ====
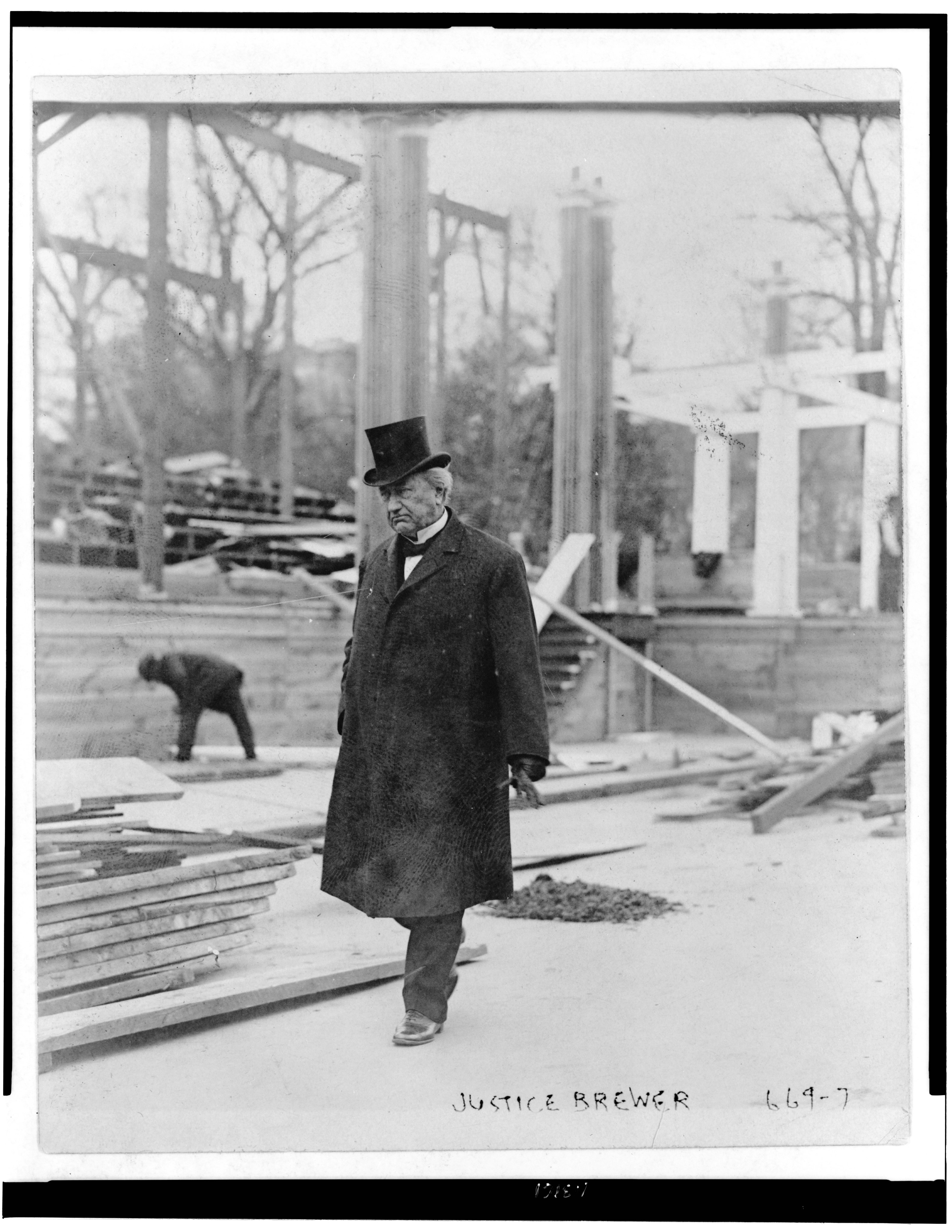
Brewer walks past a construction worker.

Brewer joined the majority in the case of Pollock v. Farmers' Loan & Trust Co., (Note: 157 U.S. 429 (1895) and 158 U.S. 601 (1895)) a decision that, according to Brodhead, "contributed much to [the Fuller Court's] reputation for favoritism toward corporate and other forms of wealth". Pollock involved a provision of the Wilson–Gorman Tariff Act of 1894 that levied a two-percent tax on incomes and corporate profits that exceeded $4000 a year. Its challengers took the tax to court, where they argued that it was a direct tax that had not been apportioned evenly among the states, in violation of a provision of the Constitution. The Supreme Court, which had only eight members at the time because Justice Howell Edmunds Jackson was ill, initially split four-to-four on the tax's constitutionality. After Jackson returned to Washington, the justices reheard the case and, in an opinion by Fuller, struck down the tax by a 5–4 vote. (Jackson ended up dissenting, meaning that a justice switched his position; scholars have suggested a number of possible explanations, but Brodhead concludes that Brewer was unlikely to have changed his vote.) The Pollock decision, which was in effect overruled by the Sixteenth Amendment to the U.S. Constitution, has conventionally been condemned as unfaithful to precedent, at odds with public opinion, and protective of the interests of the rich. In two cases—Magoun v. Illinois Trust and Savings Bank (Note: 170 U.S. 283 (1898)) and Knowlton v. Moore (Note: 178 U.S. 41 (1900))—in which the Court upheld graduated inheritance taxes by votes of 8–1 and 7–1, respectively, Brewer was the sole dissenter.

==== Interstate commerce ====
Brewer was generally hesitant to interpret the federal government's power to regulate interstate commerce expansively. He dissented in Champion v. Ames, (Note: 188 U.S. 321 (1903)) a case in which the Court sustained a federal law that forbade the interstate transportation of lottery tickets. He joined an opinion by Fuller, who argued that the majority was disturbing the balance between states and the federal government by effectively giving the latter a general police power. In United States v. E. C. Knight Co., (Note: 156 U.S. 1 (1895)) Brewer joined Fuller's opinion for an 8–1 majority holding that the Sherman Antitrust Act of 1890 did not forbid manufacturing monopolies because manufacturing was not commerce. The decision limited the Sherman Act's scope, provoking a dissent from Harlan and complaints that the Court was endeavoring to protect big business from regulation.

Nonetheless, Brewer was not uniformly deferential to the interests of business. In Northern Securities Co. v. United States, (Note: 193 U.S. 197 (1904)) he cast the deciding vote to block a merger between James J. Hill and J. P. Morgan, two of the era's leading corporate barons. In a brief concurrence that according to the legal scholar John E. Semonche "illustrates his integrity, competence, and sophistication" better than any of his other opinions, Brewer expressed support for property rights but concluded that the proposed merger was an unlawful attempt to suppress competition. His opinion endorsed the rule of reason—the idea, later accepted by his colleagues, that the Sherman Act outlawed only unreasonable restraints on commerce. Brewer joined the majority in other decisions that applied the antitrust laws more broadly, including United States v. Trans-Missouri Freight Association (Note: 166 U.S. 290 (1897)) and Addyston Pipe & Steel Co. v. United States. (Note: 175 U.S. 211 (1899))

==== In re Debs ====
In the well-known case of In re Debs, (Note: 158 U.S. 564 (1895)) Brewer's opinion for the Court "open[ed] the door for more extensive use of injunctive power by the government", according to the legal scholar James W. Ely. After members of the American Railway Union went on strike in 1894 against the Pullman Palace Car Company, the federal government sought an injunction against the union's leaders, arguing that the strike interfered with the delivery of mail. A federal court issued the injunction and, when Eugene V. Debs and other union officials ignored it, held them in contempt of court. Having been fined and imprisoned, they sought relief before the Supreme Court on the grounds that the court had no authority to issue the injunction. Brewer, writing for a unanimous Court, disagreed. He wrote that the executive branch had the power "to brush away all obstructions" to interstate commerce by force if necessary and concluded that an injunction could lawfully be issued to suppress a public nuisance. Brewer was, according to the legal historian Edward A. Purcell Jr., an "impassioned advocate of judicial power", and the ruling in Debs expanded the federal judiciary's equitable authority. The public generally approved of the decision, although it was deplored by organized labor and, together with the contemporaneous rulings in Pollock and Knight, provoked charges that the Court was biased toward the wealthy.

=== "A Christian nation": Church of the Holy Trinity v. United States ===
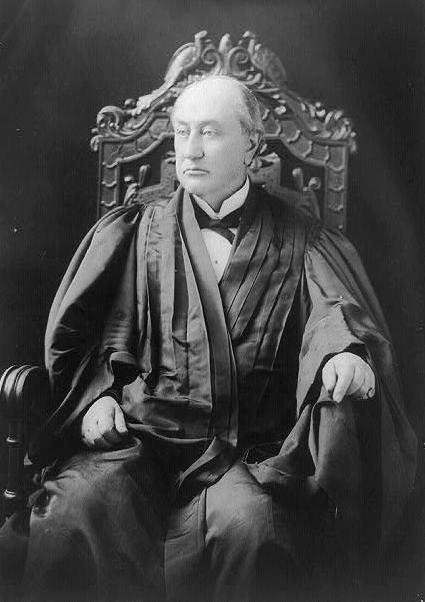
Photograph, 1907

One of Brewer's best-known opinions came in Church of the Holy Trinity v. United States. (Note: 143 U.S. 457 (1892)) The case arose when the Holy Trinity Episcopal Church hired E. Walpole Warren, a British clergyman, to be the church's rector. The church was fined $1000 for violating the Alien Contract Labor Act of 1885, under which it was "unlawful for any person, company, partnership, or corporation ... to prepay the transportation, or in any way assist or encourage the importation or migration of any alien ... under contract ... to perform labor or service of any kind in the United States". The statute did not exempt members of the clergy, and according to Semonche "the words were clear and the application logically unassailable". Yet in an opinion by Brewer, the Court unanimously reversed the conviction. Writing that "if a literal construction of the words of a statute be absurd, the act must be so construed as to avoid the absurdity", Brewer reasoned that the law was clearly intended to forbid the importation of unskilled laborers rather than ministers. The case's emphasis on Congress's intent over the statute's text marked a turning point in the Court's treatment of legislative history, and the approach it represents has drawn substantial criticism from jurists such as Antonin Scalia, who described the decision as a "prototypical" example of how statutes ought not to be interpreted.

Brewer's opinion in Holy Trinity also contained a statement that, according to the legal scholar William M. Wiecek, "would be unthinkable today" from a Supreme Court justice: that the United States "is a Christian nation". He cited religious elements of historical documents, court decisions, and "American life as expressed by its laws, its business, its customs and its society" in support of his thesis that Congress could not have intended to bar clergymen from the country. The decision came during an era in which the idea that America was a Protestant country was not particularly controversial, and few objected to Brewer's comments at the time. But legal scholars and later justices have heavily criticized the "Christian nation" claim: for instance, Justice William J. Brennan decried the declaration as "arrogant[]" in a 1984 dissent. Wiecek suggests that, while Brewer was a deeply religious man who favored Christian influence on American culture, the "Christian nation" statement was "a descriptive judgment, not a normative one" and was not of great importance as a matter of law.

=== Race ===
Like most of his colleagues, Brewer rarely sided with African-Americans in civil rights cases. Writing for the Court in Berea College v. Kentucky, (Note: 211 U.S. 45 (1908)) for instance, he upheld a law that forbade schools from racially integrating their classes. Berea College had invoked Lochner to maintain that the statute infringed on its right to practice an occupation without unreasonable interference by the government. In an opinion that stood in conspicuous conflict with his ordinary support for property rights, Brewer (over Harlan's dissent) rejected that argument, concluding that states had the ability to amend corporate charters. His majority opinion in Hodges v. United States (Note: 203 U.S. 1 (1906)) held that the federal government had no authority to prosecute a group of Arkansas whites who had driven blacks away from their jobs. He interpreted federal laws against peonage narrowly in Clyatt v. United States (Note: 197 U.S. 207 (1905)) and struck down a provision of the Civil Rights Act of 1870 in James v. Bowman. (Note: 190 U.S. 127 (1903)) Of the twenty-nine cases involving African-Americans' civil rights in which he participated, he ruled in their favor only six times. Although Brewer did not cast a vote in the landmark case of Plessy v. Ferguson (Note: 163 U.S. 537 (1896))—he had returned home to Kansas due to the death of his daughter—Paul states that he undoubtedly would have joined the majority opinion upholding "separate but equal" segregation laws had he been present.

=== Citizenship, immigration, and the territories ===
Brewer "passionately protested the treatment of the Chinese, on both procedural and substantive grounds", according to Fiss. In Fong Yue Ting v. United States, (Note: 149 U.S. 698 (1893)) he vigorously dissented when the Court ruled that Chinese non-citizens could be deported without being provided with due process, decrying the majority's understanding of the federal government's powers as "indefinite and dangerous". A displeased Brewer dissented in both United States v. Sing Tuck (Note: 194 U.S. 161 (1904)) and United States v. Ju Toy, (Note: 198 U.S. 253 (1905)) immigration cases in which the majority declined to review the decisions of administrative officials; in Sing Tuck, he wrote: "I cannot believe that the courts of this republic are so burdened with controversies about property that they cannot take time to determine the right of personal liberty by one claiming to be a citizen." He joined the majority when the Court held in United States v. Wong Kim Ark (Note: 169 U.S. 649 (1898)) that all persons born on U.S. soil are American citizens, and he dissented when a majority in Yamataya v. Fisher (Note: 189 U.S. 86 (1903)) rebuffed a Japanese deportee's due process claim. Although the Court as a whole sided with Asians in only 6 out of the 23 cases decided during his tenure, Brewer voted in their favor 18 times. Brodhead suggests that the justice, a lifelong advocate of Christian efforts to evangelize the world, may have felt that treating the Chinese compassionately would further the missionary cause.

In the Insular Cases (a group of decisions on whether constitutional protections applied to those living in the territories that the United States acquired after the Spanish–American War), Brewer opposed Justice Edward Douglass White's doctrine of incorporation—the idea that the Constitution did not fully apply to Guam, Hawaii, the Philippines, and Puerto Rico because they had not been "incorporated" by Congress. He joined the majority in DeLima v. Bidwell, (Note: 182 U.S. 1 (1901)) a case in which the Court held by a 5–4 vote that Puerto Rico was not a foreign country under federal tariff law. In another Insular Case, Downes v. Bidwell, (Note: 182 U.S. 244 (1901)) Brewer joined Fuller's dissent when the Court upheld a provision of the Foraker Act that imposed an otherwise-unconstitutional tariff on Puerto Rico. In that dissent, the Chief Justice accepted that the federal government had the ability to obtain new territories but contended that the Constitution limited its sovereignty over them. Although Brewer did not write an opinion in any of the Insular Cases, he held strong views on the matters they presented: he opposed imperialism in public remarks and wrote a letter to Fuller urging him to "stay on the court till we overthrow this unconstitutional idea of colonial supreme control".

=== Extrajudicial activities ===
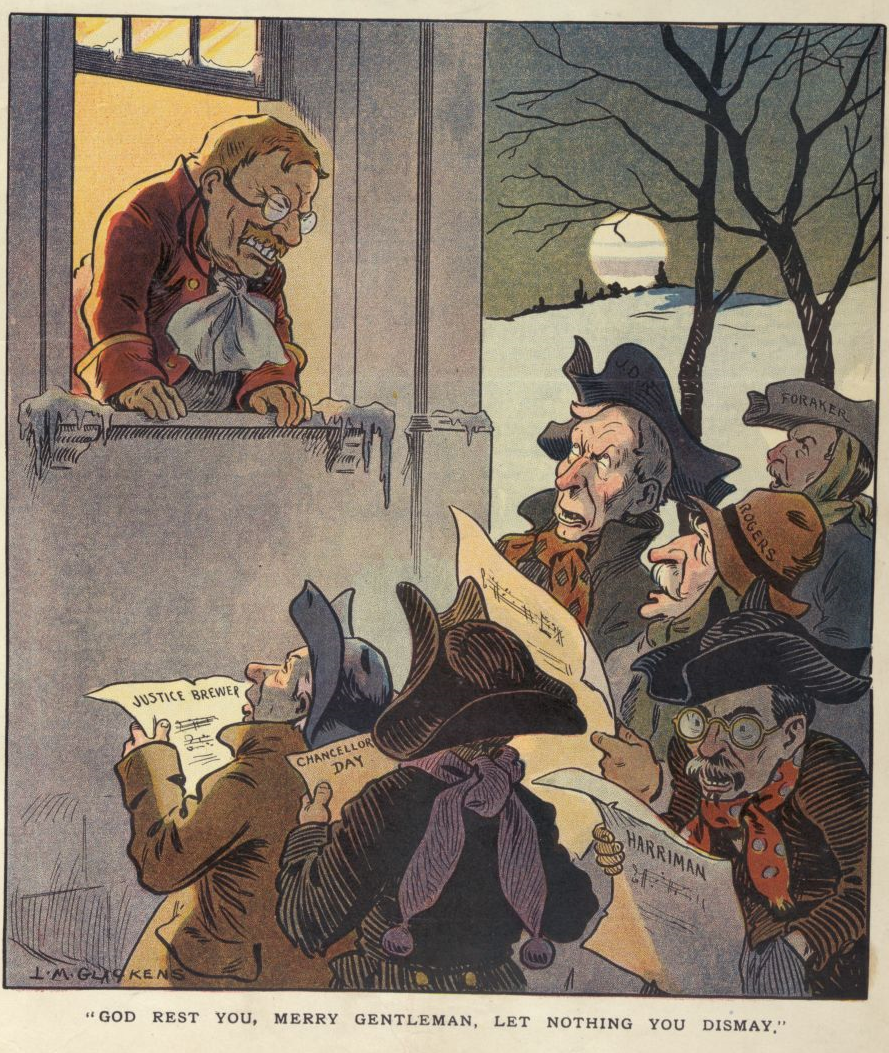
This 1907 Puck political cartoon by L. M. Glackens depicts several of Roosevelt's critics, including Brewer (bottom left), singing Christmas carols outside the President's window.

According to the historian Linda Przybyszewski, Brewer was "probably the most widely read jurist in the United States at the turn of the twentieth century" due to what Justice Holmes characterized as his "itch for public speaking". He spoke prolifically on various issues, often drawing criticism from his colleagues for his frankness. The topic about which he spoke most fervently was peace: in his public addresses he decried imperialism, arms buildups, and the horrors of war. He supported the peaceable resolution of international disputes via arbitration, and he served with Fuller on the arbitral tribunal that resolved a boundary dispute between Venezuela and the United Kingdom. Brewer was not an unqualified pacifist, but Brodhead writes that he "was a tireless, dedicated, and eloquent advocate of peace and among the most visible and vocal critics of militarism in his time". He also expressed support for education, charities, and the rights of women and ethnic minorities. Many of Brewer's speeches were later published in print; he also edited ten-volume collections of The World's Best Essays and The World's Best Orations and co-authored with Charles Henry Butler a brief treatise on international law. In his later years, he spoke increasingly on political topics: he decried Progressive reforms and inveighed against President Theodore Roosevelt, who in turn loathed Brewer and stated in private that he had "a sweetbread for a brain" and was a "menace to the welfare of the Nation".

== Personal life and death ==
Brewer adhered to a liberal form of Congregationalism, focusing on Jesus's ethical teachings and God's love for humankind instead of sin, hell, and theological principles more generally. He attended church all his life and taught Sunday school in Kansas and Washington, D.C. A firm supporter of missionary efforts, he was a member of the American Bible Society and the American Board of Commissioners for Foreign Missions. Brewer married Louise R. Landon, a native of Vermont, in 1861; they had four children. Louise died in 1898, and Brewer wed Emma Miner Mott three years afterward. Brewer's hobbies included going to the theater, hunting, playing cards, reading detective stories, and vacationing at a cottage in Vermont on Lake Champlain. He was known as a friendly and patient man.

Brewer had planned to retire from the Court when he turned seventy in 1907, but he changed his mind, saying he was "too young in spirit" to retire. In 1909, President William Howard Taft characterized the Court's state as "pitiable", writing that Fuller was "almost senile", that Harlan was doing "no work", that Brewer was "so deaf that he cannot hear" and had "got beyond the point of commonest accuracy in writing his opinions", and that Brewer and Harlan were sleeping during arguments. On March 28, 1910, Brewer, who had until then been in good health, experienced a massive stroke in his Washington, D.C., home and, before doctors could arrive, died. He was seventy-two years old. The U.S. Senate adjourned on March 29 out of respect for the justice, and Taft stated that he was an "able judge". Brewer's body was returned to Leavenworth, and a funeral was held at that city's First Congregational Church; he was buried at the Mount Muncie Cemetery in nearby Lansing. Taft nominated Charles Evans Hughes to take his place.

== Legacy ==
"History has not been kind to David Brewer", comments Fiss. He has faded into obscurity, in part because some of his colleagues—Field, Harlan, and Holmes—were figures of great prominence. Moreover, although public sentiment regarding the justice was mixed in the years following his death, he was almost never discussed favorably after the 1930s, being generally described as an ultra-conservative who adhered closely to laissez-faire principles and made the courts subservient to corporations. Although late-twentieth century revisionist scholarship took a less negative view of the Fuller Court as a whole, Brewer's reputation did not rise: Hylton comments that "[b]y advancing a more moderate interpretation of the Fuller Court as a body, some revisionist historians actually made Brewer seem even more of a reactionary figure than before". Nonetheless, a few scholarly voices, including Semonche, Brodhead, Hylton, and Purcell, have favored reevaluating the justice's reputation. Brodhead concluded his 1994 biography of Brewer by writing that he "deserves to be remembered as an important figure of a much misunderstood period in the judicial history of the United States".

== See also ==
- List of justices of the Supreme Court of the United States

== Notes ==
Legal offices
Preceded by Jacob Safford	Justice of the Kansas Supreme Court; 1871–1884	Succeeded by Theodore A. Hurd
Preceded by George W. McCrary	Judge of the United States Circuit Court for the Eighth Circuit; 1884–1889	Succeeded by Henry Clay Caldwell
Preceded by Stanley Matthews	Associate Justice of the Supreme Court of the United States; 1890–1910	Succeeded by Charles Evans Hughes
