= Preamble to the United States Constitution =

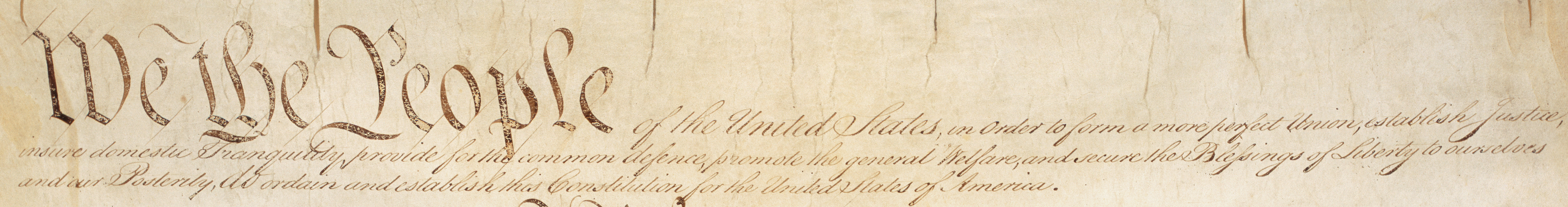
Detail of the official handwritten copy of the Preamble, engrossed by Jacob Shallus

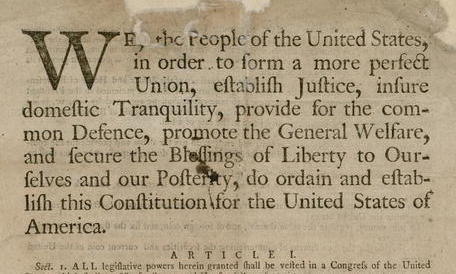
Preamble detail from a Dunlap & Claypoole original printing of the United States Constitution, 1787. (Note that there is a parenthetical comma in "We, the People of the United States" as well as multiple instances of the long s (ſ).)

The Preamble to the United States Constitution, beginning with the words "We the People", is a brief introductory statement of the Constitution's fundamental purposes and guiding principles. Courts have referred to it as reliable evidence of the Founding Fathers' intentions regarding the Constitution's meaning and what they hoped the Constitution would achieve.

The preamble was mainly written by Gouverneur Morris, a Pennsylvania delegate to the 1787 Constitutional Convention held at Independence Hall in Philadelphia.

== Text ==
We the People of the United States, in order to form a more perfect Union, establish Justice, insure domestic Tranquility, provide for the common defence, (Note: In the handwritten engrossed copy of the Constitution maintained in the National Archives, the spelling "defence", now considered British, is used in the preamble; in addition the "d" is lower case, unlike the other use of "defence" in the Constitution (Article I, Section 8) and unlike most of the other nouns in the Preamble. (See the National Archives transcription and the Archives' image of the engrossed document. Retrieved both web pages on April 17, 2016.)) promote the general Welfare, and secure the Blessings of Liberty to ourselves and our Posterity, do ordain and establish this Constitution for the United States of America.

== Drafting ==
The Preamble was placed in the Constitution during the last days of the Constitutional Convention by the Committee on Style, which wrote its final draft, with Gouverneur Morris leading the effort. It was not proposed or discussed on the floor of the convention beforehand. The initial wording of the preamble did not refer to the people of the United States; rather, it referred to people of the various states, which was the norm.

In earlier documents, including the 1778 Treaty of Alliance with France, the Articles of Confederation, and the 1783 Treaty of Paris recognizing American independence, the word "people" was not used, and the phrase the United States was followed immediately by a listing of the states, from north to south. The change was made out of necessity, as the Constitution provided that, whenever the popularly elected ratifying conventions of nine states gave their approval, it would go into effect for those nine, irrespective of whether any of the remaining states ratified.

== Meaning and application ==
The Preamble serves solely as an introduction and does not assign powers to the federal government, nor does it provide specific limitations on government action. No court has ever used it as a decisive factor in case adjudication, except as regards frivolous litigation.

=== Judicial relevance ===
The courts have shown interest in any clues they can find in the Preamble regarding the Constitution's meaning. Courts have developed several techniques for interpreting the meaning of statutes and these are also used to interpret the Constitution. As a result, the courts have said that interpretive techniques that focus on the exact text of a document should be used in interpreting the meaning of the Constitution. Balanced against these techniques are those that focus more attention on broader efforts to discern the meaning of the document from more than just the wording; the Preamble is also useful for these efforts to identify the "spirit" of the Constitution.

Additionally, when interpreting a legal document, courts are usually interested in understanding the document as its authors did and their motivations for creating it; as a result, the courts have cited the Preamble for evidence of the history, intent and meaning of the Constitution as it was understood by the Founders. Although revolutionary in some ways, the Constitution maintained many common law concepts (such as habeas corpus, trial by jury, and sovereign immunity), and courts deem that the Founders' perceptions of the legal system that the Constitution created (i.e., the interaction between what it changed and what it kept from the British legal system) are uniquely important because of the authority "the People" invested them with to create it. Along with evidence of the understandings of the men who debated and drafted the Constitution at the Constitutional Convention, the courts are also interested in the way that government officials have put into practice the Constitution's provisions, particularly early government officials, although the courts reserve to themselves the final authority to determine the Constitution's meaning. However, this focus on historical understandings of the Constitution is sometimes in tension with the changed circumstances of modern society from the late 18th century society that drafted the Constitution; courts have ruled that the Constitution must be interpreted in light of these changed circumstances. All of these considerations of the political theory behind the Constitution have prompted the Supreme Court to articulate a variety of special rules of construction and principles for interpreting it. For example, the Court's rendering of the purposes behind the Constitution have led it to express a preference for broad interpretations of individual freedoms.

=== Examples ===
An example of the way courts utilize the Preamble is Ellis v. City of Grand Rapids. Substantively, the case was about eminent domain. The City of Grand Rapids wanted to use eminent domain to force landowners to sell property in the city identified as "blighted", and convey the property to owners that would develop it in ostensibly beneficial ways: in this case, to St. Mary's Hospital, a Catholic organization. This area of substantive constitutional law is governed by the Fifth Amendment, which is understood to require that property acquired via eminent domain must be put to a "public use". In deciding whether the proposed project constituted a "public use", the court pointed to the Preamble's reference to "promot[ing] the general Welfare" as evidence that "[t]he health of the people was in the minds of our forefathers". "[T]he concerted effort for renewal and expansion of hospital and medical care centers, as a part of our nation's system of hospitals, is as a public service and use within the highest meaning of such terms. Surely this is in accord with an objective of the United States Constitution: '* * * promote the general Welfare.'"

On the other hand, courts will not interpret the Preamble to give the government powers that are not articulated elsewhere in the Constitution. United States v. Kinnebrew Motor Co. is an example of this. In that case, the defendants were a car manufacturer and dealership indicted for a criminal violation of the National Industrial Recovery Act. The Congress passed the statute in order to cope with the Great Depression, and one of its provisions purported to give to the President authority to fix "the prices at which new cars may be sold". The dealership, located in Oklahoma City, had sold an automobile to a customer (also from Oklahoma City) for less than the price for new cars fixed pursuant to the Act. Substantively, the case was about whether the transaction in question constituted "interstate commerce" that Congress could regulate pursuant to the Commerce Clause. Although the government argued that the scope of the Commerce Clause included this transaction, it also argued that the Preamble's statement that the Constitution was created to "promote the general Welfare" should be understood to permit Congress to regulate transactions such as the one in this case, particularly in the face of an obvious national emergency like the Great Depression. The court, however, dismissed this argument as erroneous and insisted that the only relevant issue was whether the transaction that prompted the indictment actually constituted "interstate commerce" under the Supreme Court's precedents that interpreted the scope of the Commerce Clause.

=== Interpretation ===
==== Aspects of national sovereignty ====
The Preamble's reference to the "United States of America" has been interpreted over the years to explain the nature of the governmental entity that the Constitution created (i.e., the federal government). In contemporary international law, the world consists of sovereign states (or "sovereign nations" in modern equivalent). A state is said to be "sovereign" if any of its ruling inhabitants are the supreme authority over it; the concept is distinct from mere land-title or "ownership." While each state was originally recognized as sovereign unto itself, the Supreme Court held that the "United States of America" consists of only one sovereign nation with respect to foreign affairs and international relations; the individual states may not conduct foreign relations. Although the Constitution expressly delegates to the federal government only some of the usual powers of sovereign governments (such as the powers to declare war and make treaties), all such powers inherently belong to the federal government as the country's representative in the international community.

Domestically, the federal government's sovereignty means that it may perform acts such as entering into contracts or accepting bonds, which are typical of governmental entities but not expressly provided for in the Constitution or laws. Similarly, the federal government, as an attribute of sovereignty, has the power to enforce those powers that are granted to it (e.g., the power to "establish Post Offices and Post Roads" includes the power to punish those who interfere with the postal system so established). The Court has recognized the federal government's supreme power over those limited matters entrusted to it. Thus, no state may interfere with the federal government's operations as though its sovereignty is superior to the federal government's (discussed more below); for example, states may not interfere with the federal government's near absolute discretion to sell its own real property, even when that real property is located in one or another state. The federal government exercises its supreme power not as a unitary entity, but instead via the three coordinate branches of the government (legislative, executive, and judicial), each of which has its own prescribed powers and limitations under the Constitution. In addition, the doctrine of separation of powers functions as a limitation on each branch of the federal government's exercise of sovereign power.

One aspect of the American system of government is that, while the rest of the world now views the United States as one country, domestically American constitutional law recognizes a federation of state governments separate from (and not subdivisions of) the federal government, each of which is sovereign over its own affairs. Sometimes, the Supreme Court has even analogized the States to being foreign countries to each other to explain the American system of State sovereignty. However, each state's sovereignty is limited by the U.S. Constitution, which is the supreme law of both the United States as a nation and each state; in the event of a conflict, a valid federal law controls. As a result, although the federal government is (as discussed above) recognized as sovereign and has supreme power over those matters within its control, the American constitutional system also recognizes the concept of "State sovereignty", where certain matters are susceptible to government regulation, but only at the State and not the federal level. For example, although the federal government prosecutes crimes against the United States (such as treason, or interference with the postal system), the general administration of criminal justice is reserved to the States. Notwithstanding sometimes broad statements by the Supreme Court regarding the "supreme" and "exclusive" powers the State and Federal governments exercise, the Supreme Court and State courts have also recognized that much of their power is held and exercised concurrently.

==== People of the United States ====
The phrase "People of the United States" has been understood to mean "nationals and citizens." This approach reasons that, if the political community speaking for itself in the Preamble ("We the People") includes only U.S. nationals and citizens, by negative implication it specifically excludes non-citizens in some way. It has also been construed to mean something like "all under the sovereign jurisdiction and authority of the United States." The phrase has been construed as affirming that the national government created by the Constitution derives its sovereignty from the people, (whereas "United Colonies" had identified external monarchical sovereignty) as well as confirming that the government under the Constitution was intended to govern and protect "the people" directly, as one society, instead of governing only the states as political units. The Court has also understood this language to mean that the sovereignty of the government under the U.S. Constitution is superior to that of the States. Stated in negative terms, the Preamble has been interpreted as meaning that the Constitution was not the act of sovereign and independent states.

==== The popular nature of the Constitution ====
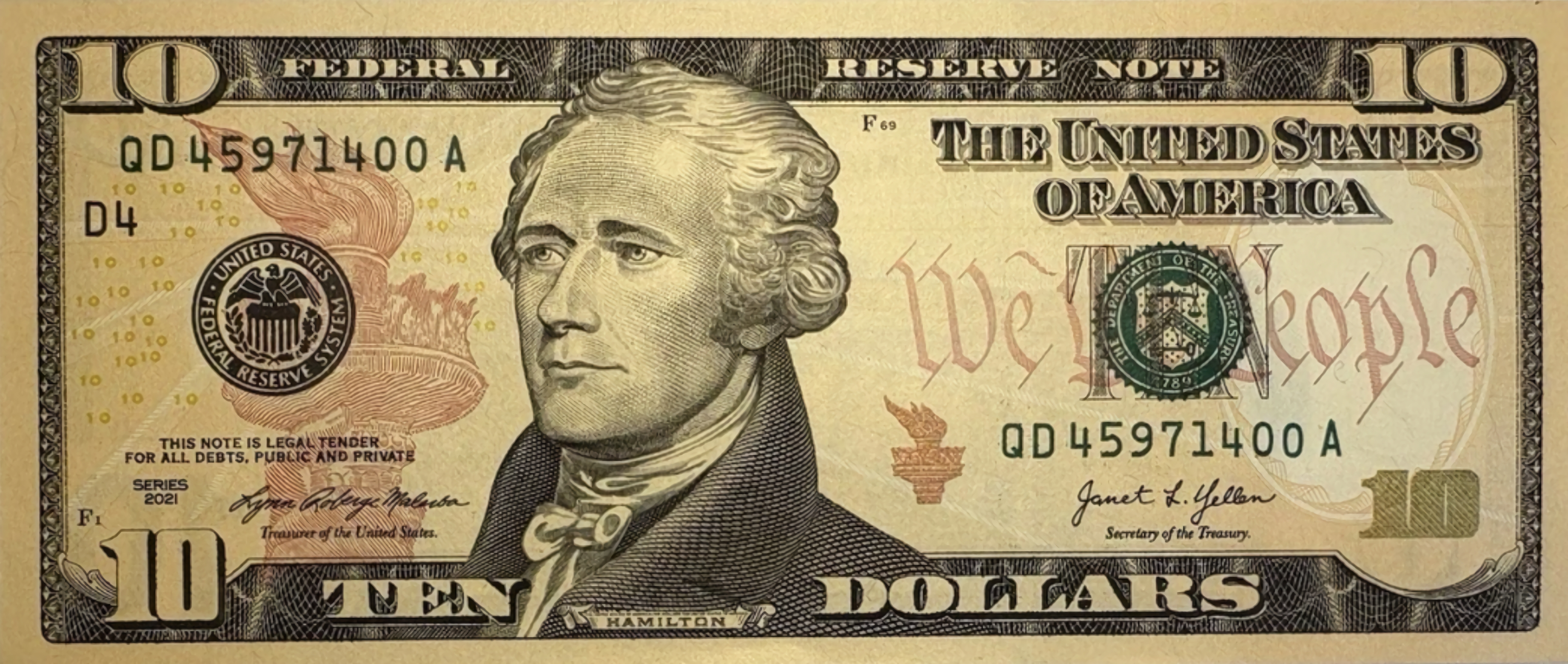
"We the People" from the original engrossed constitution has been displayed on the obverse of the United States ten-dollar bill since 2006

The Constitution claims to be an act of "We the People." However, because it represents a general social contract, there are limits on the ability of individual citizens to pursue legal claims allegedly arising out of the Constitution. For example, if a law were enacted which violated the Constitution, not just anybody could challenge the statute's constitutionality in court; instead, only an individual who was negatively affected by the unconstitutional statute could bring such a challenge. For example, a person claiming certain benefits that are created by a statute cannot then challenge, on constitutional grounds, the administrative mechanism that awards them. These same principles apply to corporate entities, and can implicate the doctrine of exhaustion of remedies.

In this same vein, courts will not answer hypothetical questions about the constitutionality of a statute. The judiciary does not have the authority to invalidate unconstitutional laws solely because they are unconstitutional, but may declare a law unconstitutional if its operation would injure a person's interests. For example, creditors who lose some measure of what they are owed when a bankrupt's debts are discharged cannot claim injury, because Congress' power to enact bankruptcy laws is also in the Constitution and inherent in it is the ability to declare certain debts valueless. Similarly, while a person may not generally challenge as unconstitutional a law that they are not accused of violating, once charged, a person may challenge the law's validity, even if the challenge is unrelated to the circumstances of the crime.

==== Where the Constitution is legally effective ====
The Preamble has been used to confirm that the Constitution was made for, and is binding only in, the United States of America. For example, in Casement v. Squier, a serviceman in China during World War II was convicted of murder in the United States Court for China. After being sent to prison in the State of Washington, he filed a writ of habeas corpus with the local federal court, claiming he had been unconstitutionally put on trial without a jury. The court held that, since his trial was conducted by an American court and was, by American standards, basically fair, he was not entitled to the specific constitutional right of trial by jury while overseas.

The Supreme Court held in 1901 that since the Preamble declares the Constitution to have been created by the "People of the United States", "there may be places within the jurisdiction of the United States that are no part of the Union." The following examples help demonstrate the meaning of this distinction:

- Geofroy v. Riggs, 133 U.S. 258 (1890): the Supreme Court held that a certain treaty between the United States and France which was applicable in "the States of the Union" was also applicable in Washington, D.C., even though it is not a state or a part of a state.
- DeLima v. Bidwell, 182 U.S. 1 (1901): the Supreme Court ruled that a customs collector could not, under a statute providing for taxes on imported goods, collect taxes on goods coming from Puerto Rico after it had been ceded to the United States from Spain, reasoning that although it was not a State, it was under the jurisdiction of U.S. sovereignty, and thus the goods were not being imported from a foreign country. However, in Downes v. Bidwell, 182 U.S. 244 (1901), the Court held that the Congress could constitutionally enact a statute taxing goods sent from Puerto Rico to ports in the United States differently from other commerce, in spite of the constitutional requirement that "all Duties, Imposts and Excises shall be uniform throughout the United States," on the theory that although Puerto Rico could not be treated as a foreign country, it did not count as part of the "United States" and thus was not guaranteed "uniform" tax treatment by that clause of the Constitution. This was not the only constitutional clause held not to apply in Puerto Rico: later, a lower court went on to hold that goods brought from Puerto Rico into New York before the enactment of the tax statute held constitutional in Downes, could retroactively have the taxes applied to them notwithstanding the Constitution's ban on ex post facto laws, even if at the time they were brought into the United States no tax could be applied to the goods because Puerto Rico was not a foreign country.
- Ochoa v. Hernandez y Morales, 230 U.S. 139 (1913): the Fifth Amendment's requirement that "no person shall ... be deprived of ... property, without due process of law" was held, by the Supreme Court, to apply in Puerto Rico, even though it was not a State and thus not "part" of the United States.

==== To form a more perfect Union ====
The phrase "to form a more perfect Union" has been construed as referring to the shift to the Constitution from the Articles of Confederation. The contemporaneous meaning of the word "perfect" was complete, finished, fully informed, confident, or certain. The phrase has been interpreted in various ways throughout history based on the context of the times. For example, shortly after the Civil War and the ratification of the Fourteenth Amendment, the Supreme Court said that the "Union" was made "more perfect" by the creation of a federal government with enough power to act directly upon citizens, rather than a government with narrowly limited power that could act on citizens only indirectly through the states, e.g., by imposing taxes. Also, the institution was created as a government over the States and people, not an agreement (union) between the States.

In the 21st century, following a pivotal, widely reported speech entitled "A More Perfect Union" by then-candidate Barack Obama in 2008, the phrase has also come to mean the continual process of improvement of the country.

To know what has come before is to be armed against despair. If the men and women of the past, with all their flaws and limitations and ambitions and appetites, could press on through ignorance and superstition, racism and sexism, selfishness and greed, to create a freer, stronger nation, then perhaps we, too, can right wrongs and take another step toward that most enchanting and elusive destinations: a more perfect Union."

— Jon Meacham, 2018

The phrase has also been interpreted to support the constitution's Supremacy Clause as well as to demonstrate that state nullification of any federal law, dissolution of the Union, or secession from it, are not contemplated by the Constitution.

== In education ==
Beginning in 1976, many children in the United States learned the words of the preamble from a Schoolhouse Rock! segment titled "The Preamble". Later studies showed that the segment was effective in teaching and reinforcing long-term memory of the words, although a spoken version was more effective for understanding their meaning. Though "The Preamble" proved memorable, for metric reasons it deviated from the actual wording by omitting the words "of the United States" from the first line.

== See also ==
- Liberty
- Preamble
