= American Samoan citizenship and nationality =

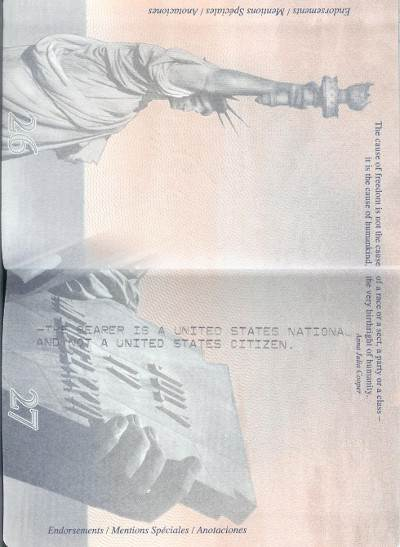
Message in the passport of an American Samoan, stating that the passport holder is a "national", but not a citizen, of the United States

American Samoa is a territory of the United States with a population of about 44,000 people, but the people of American Samoa do not have birthright citizenship in the United States. Instead of being considered citizens, they are classified as non-citizen "nationals" of the United States. American Samoa is the only permanently inhabited territory of the United States whose inhabitants do not have birthright citizenship.

Non-citizen nationals do not have full protection of their rights, though they may reside and work in the United States and can gain entry without a visa. Territorial citizens do not have the ability for full participation in national politics and American Samoans cannot serve as officers in the U.S. military or in many federal jobs, vote in local elections, serve on a jury, or hold public office or civil-service positions even when residing in a U.S. state. Like non-Americans, American Samoans can apply to become naturalized U.S. citizens once they reach the age of 18 and have resided in the U.S., including in American Samoa, for five years without leaving the U.S. for more than 6 months at a time.

Nationality is the legal means in which inhabitants acquire formal membership in a nation without regard to its governance type, whereas citizenship is the relationship between the government and the governed, i.e. a set of rights and obligations that each owes the other once someone has been classified as a citizen of a nation.

American Samoa consists of a group of two coral atolls and five volcanic islands in the South Pacific Ocean of Oceania. The first permanent European settlement was founded in 1830 by British missionaries, who were followed by explorers from the United States, in 1839, and German traders in 1845. Based upon the Tripartite Convention of 1899, the United States, Great Britain, and Germany agreed to partition the islands into German Samoa and American Samoa. Though the territory was ceded to the United States in a series of transactions in 1900, 1904, and 1925, Congress did not formally confirm its acquisition until 1929.

== History ==
=== Background (1722–1922) ===
A brief 2016 story on American Samoan nationality from Voice of America

The Dutch first sighted the Samoan Islands in 1722. The French later noted them in 1768, giving them the name Navigator Islands. No permanent European settlements occurred until John Williams of the London Missionary Society established a mission in the islands in 1830. Charles Wilkes led the United States Exploring Expedition, which surveyed the islands and drafted commercial regulations in 1839 and in 1845, George Pritchard arrived as the British consul. The German trading firm J.C. Godeffroy & Sohn began commercial operations in the Samoan archipelago in 1857. German expansion on the island included oil extraction and founding the first coconut plantations. Struggle for control of the area by Western powers eventually led to the Tripartite Convention of 1899, in which the United States, Great Britain, and Germany agreed to partition the islands into German Samoa and American Samoa.

Prior to 1898, all persons born in U.S. possessions were treated as having been born in the United States, and upon acquisition, provisions were made for collective naturalization of the inhabitants. After that date, possessions have been selectively judged to be foreign localities and not subject to the Citizenship Clause of the Fourteenth Amendment. Under the Insular Cases (1901–1922), the US Supreme Court ruled that unincorporated territories and insular possessions of the United States, which were not on a path toward statehood, had limited applicability of the U.S. Constitution. At the time, these included Guam, the Philippines, and Puerto Rico, acquired in 1898 at the end of the Spanish–American War. According to the decisions, those born in insular possessions or unincorporated territories were not eligible for citizenship, though they were considered nationals and could hold a U.S. passport and gain diplomatic protection from the United States. Because of the rulings, all persons in the U.S. outlying possessions were considered U.S. non-citizen nationals, until Congress chose to convey full rights of citizenship.

=== Establishing nationality for American Samoa (1900–1951) ===
On February 16, 1900, the agreement was ratified, and on April 17, Tutuila was ceded by Samoan chiefs to the United States. Four years later the Manuʻa Islands group were also ceded by their chiefs. The islands came under the administration of the United States Navy with the proviso that U.S. laws in the territory could not conflict with traditional Samoan custom. Since ratification in 1900, all inhabitants born in American Samoa have been United States nationals and since 1906, when the U.S. Congress passed special provisions, persons born in unincorporated territories can be naturalized in the United States. Failure of the acting governor, Benjamin Franklin Tilley, to sign the Deeds of Cession, led to a thirty-year delay in formal recognition by the U.S. government. The chiefs, who had exchanged their lands for U.S. citizenship pressed for clarification of their status. Swains Island was acquired and incorporated into American Samoa in 1925, but the United States was indifferent to formal annexation of the island and incorporating its non-white inhabitants into equal partnership in the nation.

The Mau movement, which was pushing for independence and an end to colonialism, finally led to action by Congress to acknowledge Samoa. Conflicts arose over naval laws and local custom, such as a 1919 law banning interracial marriage. The navy justified the law by arguing that it was protection against extinction of Polynesians and in agreement with other legislation in the United States. However, in the United States at that time, two laws governed marriages between foreigners and U.S. citizens. The 1855 Nationality Act required foreign women to automatically acquire the nationality of the husband upon marriage and the Expatriation Act of 1907 definitively stated that U.S.-born women lost their nationality upon marriage if their spouse was a foreigner. (Note: Immigration appeals later confirmed that American Samoan women did not lose their nationality after 1922 upon marriage to foreign men, even if the husband was an excluded class, because the Cable Act expressly stated that women citizens who married ineligible foreigners lost their nationality. As American Samoan women were non-citizen nationals, the law was inapplicable.) The miscegenation law fueled Samoan belief that the navy believed them to be an inferior and primitive people. The initial demands of the Samoans in the Mau movement were creation of a local Samoan assembly with an executive council to advise on governance and the removal of naval administration, repeal of the anti-miscegenation law on marriage, publication of laws in the Samoan language, and various improvements to infrastructure.

In 1928, in response to media pressure about the Mau movement and naval rule of American Samoa, a commission was formed to investigate conditions in the territory and make recommendations for legislation to address concerns of Samoans. After consultations with Samoan elders and communities, in 1929, Congress confirmed the acquisition of the territory, designating its inhabitants non-citizen nationals of the United States. The commission recommended that Congress collectively naturalize and extend federal citizenship to all inhabitants of American Samoa who were living in Samoa, Hawaii, or the United States on February 20, 1929, and that they create territorial citizenship for Samoans. Because the Territorial Clause of the Constitution gave Congress sole authority to regulate on behalf of United States territories and possessions, the matter of drafting an organic act for American Samoa rested with Congress. Though an organic act was drafted in 1930, Congress never ratified it, in part due to the lack of support by naval personnel and in part due to fears of spending funds abroad when many people in the United States were suffering because of the Great Depression. Instead, they drafted a Bill of Rights, which was added to the Code of American Samoa, gave more autonomy for local affairs to Samoan leaders, and created a commission to address land ownership disputes.

Though islanders continued to press for an organic act, none was forthcoming, despite Congressional hearings being held in 1931, 1936, and 1937. In the late 1940s, island leadership requested that legislation on the citizenship of Samoans be curtailed for ten years. The US Nationality Act of 1940 provided that American Samoans, born to U.S. nationals who were indigenous to Samoa, on or after February 16, 1900, or on Swains Island on or after March 4, 1925, and in both cases before January 13, 1941, were non-citizen nationals of the United States. This was amended by the Nationality Act of 1952, to confirm the acquisition of non-citizen nationality by birth for those born in American Samoa on or after it was formally acquired. Under international and domestic pressure at the end of World War II, the United States passed administration of the territory from the navy to the US Interior Department in 1951.

== Current schemes ==
=== Domestic citizenship (1900–present) ===
In 1900, local administration was authorized by the "Declaration of the Form of Government", which established a judiciary system. In 1930, a Bill of Rights was added to the American Samoan Code and the secretary of native affairs and chief justice of the high court became separate offices. In 1953, a constitutional committee was established in American Samoa and its first constitution was promulgated in 1960. The constitution provided for organization of executive, judiciary, and legislative (known as the Fono) structures similar to the United States, but policies for each branch are dependent upon Samoan culture. Among those policies are the concept of ʻaiga, a kinship system of regulating extended families and family leaders known as matai who regulate and protect community governance and communal land ownership. Because the constitution was accepted by the Department of the Interior, rather than the U.S. Congress, the territory remains unorganized. In 1967, a revised Constitution was adopted in American Samoa. Territorial citizens are allowed to vote in elections for the executive and House representatives and those who are U.S. nationals and are twenty-five years old and have lived in American Samoa for five years can run for office. Senators are selected by matai in local council meetings. High judges are appointed by the Secretary of the Interior, and associate judges are selected by the executive from the matai. Matai must be registered and the court has the authority to determine if candidates are qualified to represent their kin groups. Land in American Samoa, unless they are freehold lands and not subject to communal family property requirements, can only be owned by persons who have at least fifty percent Samoan blood and were born in American Samoa, are descended of a Samoan family, and intend to reside in the territory for life. Since the decision in King v. Andrus (452 F. Supp. 11 D.D.C., 1977), trial by jury has been required in criminal cases in American Samoa.

=== Federal citizenship controversy (1960–present) ===
Finding in Leneuoti Tuaua v. USA, U.S. Court of Appeals for the District of Columbia Circuit from 2015

In 1960, discussion renewed on whether an organic act should be passed for American Samoa. In 1969, such legislation was rejected because of concerns that conflicts in U.S. law would damage the traditional social structure of the territory. The issue was revisited in 1975, and though it was supported by Samoans, no change was made to the status of the territory, but it was granted official congressional delegate status for its delegate to the United States House of Representatives in 1978. Despite changes in local ordinances, American Samoans do not have full protection of their constitutional rights, though they may reside in the United States and gain entry without a visa. They cannot serve as officers in the U.S. military or in many federal jobs, are unable to bear arms, cannot serve on a jury, cannot vote in federal or local elections outside of their territory, or hold public office or civil-service positions even when residing in a U.S. state.

Because of the unequal status of territorial citizens, inhabitants have instituted legal actions to address discrepancies. In 2012, Leneuoti Tuaua, an American Samoan, filed suit after he was prevented from becoming a police officer in California. His suit claimed that all people in the United States have birthright citizenship under the 14th Amendment. In 2015, the United States Court of Appeals for the District of Columbia Circuit ruled in Tuaua v. United States (788 F.3d 300, D.C. Cir., 2015) that birthright citizenship as outlined in the Constitution is a vague concept and that it did not apply to American Samoa. Though appealed to the U.S. Supreme Court, the justices refused to review the decision. In 2018, John Fitisemanu, an American Samoan who had lived and paid taxes in Utah for twenty years, sued the United States because of his inability to vote. The government of American Samoa intervened with permission of the United States District Court for the District of Utah, arguing that U.S. citizenship should not be imposed upon American Samoa. In 2019, U.S. District Judge Clark Waddoups struck down the status of non-citizen nationals as unconstitutional and in violation of the 14th Amendment. He rejected government attorneys' arguments based on Downes v. Bidwell (182 U.S. 244, 1901) as Downes was not a 14th Amendment issue, but rather involved taxation. In 2021, a divided panel of the United States Court of Appeals for the Tenth Circuit ruled in Fitisemanu v. United States (No. 20-4017, 10th Cir. 2021) that "neither the Constitution nor Supreme Court precedent demands the district court's decision", and reversed it. A petition for a writ of certiorari in the case of Fitisemanu v. United States was denied on October 17, 2022, by the Supreme Court of the United States.
