= Fitisemanu v. United States =

2021 federal legal case regarding birthright citizenship in US territories

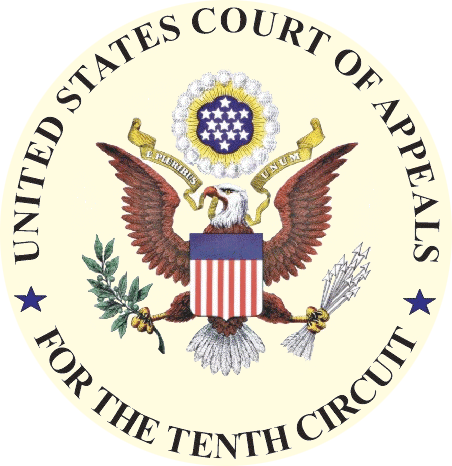
- Court: United States Court of Appeals for the Tenth Circuit
- Decided: December 27 2021

Holding
- People born in American Samoa are not entitled to birthright citizenship under the Fourteenth Amendment to the United States Constitution

Fitisemanu v. United States, 1 F.4th 862 (10th Cir. 2021), was a case in which the Supreme Court of the United States was asked to consider if the Insular Cases should be overturned and whether people living in American territories such as American Samoa are guaranteed birthright citizenship under the Fourteenth Amendment to the United States Constitution.

The petition for certiorari was filed six days after Justice Neil Gorsuch called, in a concurring opinion to United States v. Vaello Madero, for the Insular Cases to be overturned in "an appropriate case." He wrote that the Insular Cases are "shameful," "have no foundation in the Constitution and rest instead on racial stereotypes," and "deserve no place in our law."

The Supreme Court discussed the case in their conference of October 14, 2022, and decided to deny certiorari.

== Background ==
Since 1900, American Samoa has been a territory of the United States of America. However, people born in American Samoa are not entitled to birthright citizenship as are people born in the fifty states and all other major territories. They are considered to be "United States nationals" instead.

The three petitioners in this case are from American Samoa and are suing the United States to allow them to automatically receive United States citizenship, arguing that they should be given American citizenship as they live in American territories and seek the court to overturn the Insular Cases. The District Court of Utah agreed with the petitioners that they should be given birthright citizenship. In his opinion, Judge Waddoups cited United States v. Wong Kim Ark (1898) and ruled that American Samoans are entitled to birthright citizenship under Section 1 of the Fourteenth Amendment to the United States Constitution and struck down the non-citizen status of American Samoans.

The United States appealed and in a 2–1 decision the United States Court of Appeals for the Tenth Circuit reversed the district court decision with Judge Bacharach dissenting. The court cited one of the Insular Cases, Downes v. Bidwell, as a Supreme Court Precedent not to affirm the lower court's decision. The Court of Appeals also denied an en banc hearing, over the dissent of Judges Bacharach and Moritz.

A petition for writ of certiorari was filed in the United States Supreme Court on April 27 and was discussed in their conference on October 14, 2022 and decided to deny certiorari on October 17, 2022.

== Previous and related cases ==
In Tuaua v. United States (2012), the United States Court of Appeals for the District of Columbia ruled that American Samoans are not entitled to birthright citizenship under the Fourteenth Amendment to the United States Constitution.

In United States v. Vaello Madero (2022), Justice Gorsuch concurred with the majority opinion; however, he wrote that the Insular Cases rested on a "rotten foundation" and expressed his willingness to overrule that decision.

== See also ==
- Pacific Islands Americans
