= Isabel González =

Puerto Rican activist

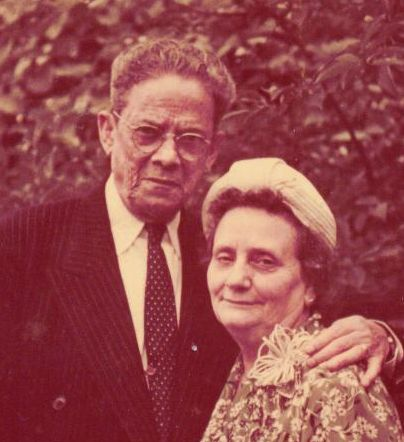
- Isabel González with her husband Juan Francisco Torres. Isabel paved the way for Puerto Ricans to be given United States citizenship
- Born: May 2, 1882; San Juan, Puerto Rico
- Died: June 11, 1971 (aged 89); New Jersey
- Occupation: Activist
- Spouse: Juan Francisco Torres
- Relatives: Parents: Severo González and Antonia Dávila of San Juan, Puerto Rico

Isabel González (May 2, 1882 – June 11, 1971) was a Puerto Rican activist who helped pave the way for Puerto Ricans to be given United States citizenship. As a young unwed pregnant woman, González had her plans to find and marry the father of her unborn child derailed by the United States Treasury Department when she was excluded as an alien "likely to become a public charge" upon her arrival in New York City. González challenged the Government of the United States in the groundbreaking case Gonzales v. Williams (192 U.S. 1 (1904)). Officially the case was known as Isabella Gonzales, Appellant, v. William Williams, United States Commissioner of Immigration at the Port of New York No. 225, argued December 4, 7, 1903, and decided January 4, 1904. Her case was an appeal from the Circuit Court of the United States for the Southern District of New York, filed February 27, 1903, after also having her writ of habeas corpus (HC. 1-187) dismissed. Her Supreme Court case is the first time that the Court confronted the citizenship status of inhabitants of territories acquired by the United States. González actively pursued the cause of U.S. citizenship for all Puerto Ricans by writing letters published in The New York Times.

== Early years ==
González was born and raised in San Juan, Puerto Rico when the island was still a possession of the Spanish Crown. Therefore, she was a native inhabitant of Puerto Rico and a Spanish subject, though not of the Peninsula (Spain). Her parents were Severo González and Antonia Dávila. She was residing in the island on April 11, 1899, the date of the proclamation of the Treaty of Paris of 1898 which ceded the island to the United States. One of the conditions of the treaty was to transfer by cession the allegiance of the islanders to the United States. González was a citizen of Puerto Rico, but not of the United States even though the island was governed by that nation.

González's fiancé traveled to New York City in 1902, leaving her behind, pregnant and with another child from a previous marriage (she was a widow). He went with the intention of finding a job in a factory in Linoleumville, Staten Island, in the neighborhood where Isabel's brother Luis González worked. González was to join her fiancé there and they were to marry after he found a place to live.

== Situation in Puerto Rico pre-1904 ==
Under the terms of the Treaty of Paris of 1898 which was ratified on December 10, 1898, Puerto Rico was annexed by the United States after the 1898 Spanish–American War. Spain had lost its last colony in the Western Hemisphere. The United States established a military government which acted as both head of the army of occupation and administrator of civil affairs. Almost immediately, the United States began the "Americanization" process of Puerto Rico. The U.S. occupation brought about a total change in Puerto Rico's economy and polity and did not apply democratic principles in their colony. Puerto Rico was classified as an "unincorporated territory" which meant that the protections of the United States Constitution — including the right of citizenship — did not automatically apply, because the island belonged to the U.S., but was not part of the U.S.

On January 15, 1899, the military government changed the name of Puerto Rico to Porto Rico (On May 17, 1932, the U.S. Congress changed the name back to "Puerto Rico") and the island's currency was changed from the Puerto Rican peso to the American dollar, integrating the island's currency into the U.S. monetary system. The United States exerted its control over the economy of the island by prohibiting Puerto Rico from negotiating commercial treaties with other nations, from determining tariffs, and from shipping goods to the mainland on other than U.S. carriers.

== Opposition to U.S. citizenship for Puerto Ricans ==
There were various factors which contributed to the opposition of giving United States citizenship to Puerto Ricans by the Government of the United States. The U.S. Congress was reluctant to fully incorporate Puerto Rico because its population was deemed racially and socially inferior to that of the mainland. In 1899, a letter to the editor published in The New York Times described Puerto Ricans as "a light-hearted, simple-minded, harmless, indolent, docile people," claiming that "while they gamble and are fond of wine, women, music, and dancing, they are honest and sober," but compared them to "children" who lacked "sufficient knowledge to govern themselves" and were in need of education as to "what government of the people means."

Prior to 1898, the United States had organized new acquisitions from non-tribal governments into largely self-governing territories as a prelude to statehood and had generally extended broad constitutional protections and U.S. citizenship to free, non-tribal residents. After 1898, this process changed, and Congress established a centrally controlled administration in Puerto Rico, declining to recognize Puerto Ricans as U.S. citizens. As a result, many Dominicans started marrying Puerto Ricans in greater numbers in order to stop immigration problems at US ports of entry. After 1917, the citizenship of Puerto Ricans became transferable to some nationalities, mostly from Latin America, such as the Colombians and Venezuelans.

In the Downes v. Bidwell case of 1901, the U.S. Supreme Court acknowledged that the U.S. Constitution functioned differently in Puerto Rico from the way it did on the mainland. Justice Edward Douglass White introduced the concept of unincorporated territories and reasoned that, unlike prior territories, Puerto Rico had not been incorporated by Congress or by treaty into the U.S. union. It was thus "foreign to the United States in a domestic sense", that is, foreign for domestic law purposes, yet also part of the United States under international law. The decision permitted the establishment of unequal, undemocratic polities in such territories, did not demand that those territories eventually be incorporated, and granted wide latitude to Congress and the executive in structuring those polities.

== González travels to New York City ==
In August 1902, González boarded the S.S. Philadelphia, a small Red D Line steamship that departed from San Juan, Puerto Rico, with the Port of New York as its destination. She sent a telegram to her family about her expected arrival, which would normally be at the docks of New York. But while the S.S. Philadelphia was en route, the United States Treasury Department's Immigration Commissioner General F. P. Sargent issued new immigration guidelines that changed González's and her fellow countrymen's status to that of aliens. Gonzalez and the others arrived on August 4, 1902, and were transferred to Ellis Island.

The new commissioner of immigration at Ellis Island was William Williams, a former Wall Street lawyer. He was aggressively leveling the statutory bar on those aliens "likely to become a public charge", and he was strictly enforcing immigration laws. Williams directed inspectors to treat aliens as suspect if traveling with less than ten dollars. He also instructed his inspectors to attach the label of "public charge" to unmarried mothers and their children, despite most of them already expecting to receive a job upon admission to the United States. Ellis Island policy dictated that "unmarried pregnant women were always detained for further investigation" and that single women were released only if family members came to claim them.

González was detained by the Immigration Commissioner at that port as an "alien immigrant" so that she might be returned to Puerto Rico if it appeared that she was likely to become a public charge. Gonzalez had eleven dollars in cash on her person and her family was to pick her up, however the immigration officials discovered her pregnancy during her early line inspection and a Board of Special Inquiry opened a file on her (her surname was later misspelled as "Gonzales" by immigration officials).

== Board Hearings ==
A hearing was held the next day and González's uncle, Domingo Collazo, and her brother, Luis González, joined her (her fiancé did not appear, as he was not permitted to miss work). During the hearings, the family focused on the question of preserving González's honor and bringing her to New York. Inspectors weighed proof of legitimate family relations against presumptions that certain kinds of women were inadequate mothers and certain kinds of men were insufficient fathers and husbands. Williams said:

It will be a very easy matter to fill up this country rapidly with immigrants upon whom responsibility for the proper bringing up of their offspring sits lightly, but it cannot be claimed that this will enure to the benefit of the American people.

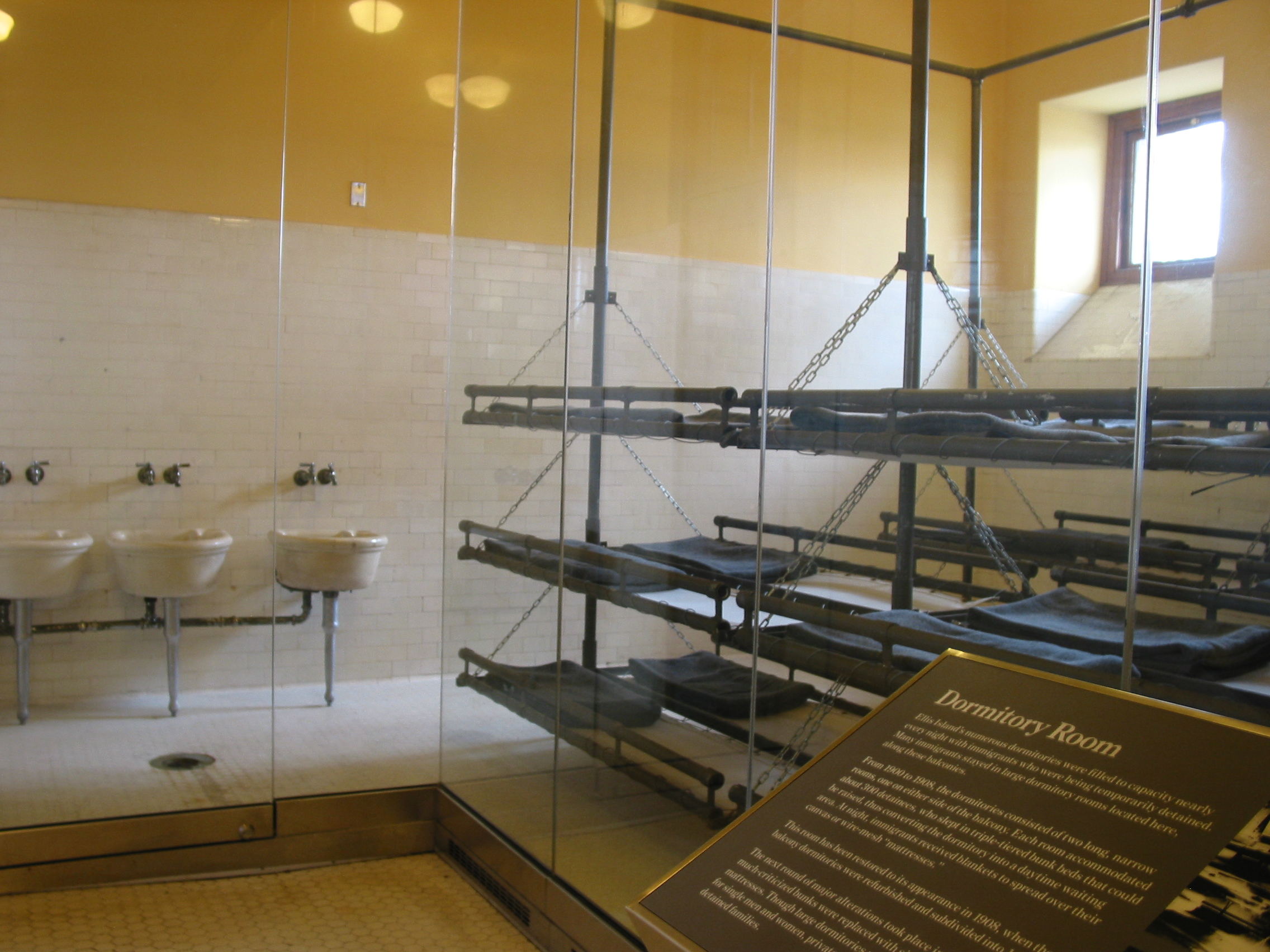
Dormitory room in Ellis Island for detained immigrants

Two days later, without help from the father of Isabel González's expected child, González's brother and Domingo Collazo's wife, Hermina Collazo (Isabel's aunt), tried to assure the court they could help González. The family insisted that Gonzalez would not be a burden to the State's Welfare system since they had the economic means to support her. These attempts failed, in part because González's fiancé failed to appear at the hearing. The immigration authorities placed emphasis on his absence in its decision to stop her from entering the mainland US.

Collazo drew on his political and professional connections. In the 1890s, he had been active in the Revolutionary Committee of Puerto Rico, a radical wing of the Cuban Revolutionary Party that sought an Antillean social revolution to improve the status of workers and people of African descent. He had attended meetings with the Antillean activists Arturo Alfonso Schomburg and Rosendo Rodríguez. Collazo swore a habeas corpus petition for González. A friend of González related the story to Orrel A. Parker, a lawyer. His partner Charles E. Le Barbier became interested in the case and filed Collazo's petition with the U.S. Circuit Court for the Southern District of New York. Seven weeks later, however, the court issued its opinion, ruling that the petitioner was an alien and upholding her exclusion.

== United States Supreme Court: Gonzales v. Williams ==
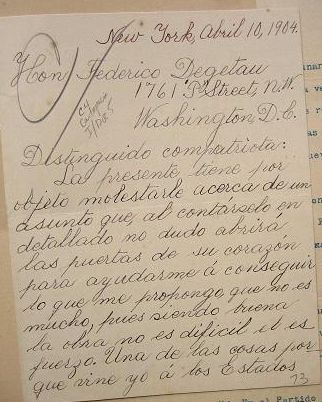
Letter written by Isabel Gonzalez to Federico Degetau in April 1904

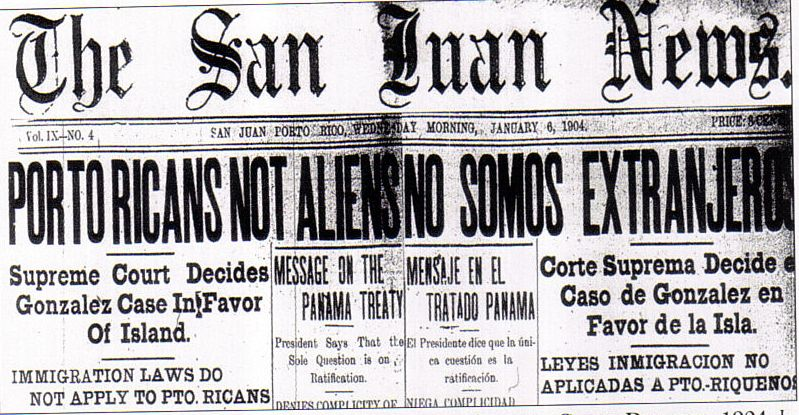
Cover of The San Juan News announcing the Supreme Court decision in the Isabel Gonzalez case of 1904.

On August 30, 1902, Federico Degetau, an expert in international law and the first Resident Commissioner of Puerto Rico to the United States House of Representatives, unaware of the Gonzalez situation, wrote to the Secretary of State in protest of the new rules that made Puerto Ricans subject to immigration laws. His protest was forwarded to the Treasury Department. Degetau then contacted Le Barbier and Parker, who informed him that they planned to appeal Gonzalez's case to the Supreme Court.

Once González lost her administrative appeal, she switched tactics. She decided to appeal and to take her case to the United States Supreme Court, however this time instead of focusing on the "public charge" issue, she decided to take up the issue that all Puerto Ricans were citizens of the United States and as such should not be detained, treated as aliens and denied entry into the United States.

Degetau saw in the case of González the perfect "test case" because now it would not be about whether immigration inspectors, following guidelines suffused with concepts of race and gender, deemed González and her family desirable. The case now would be about settling the status of all the native islanders who were in existence at the time the Spanish possessions were annexed by the United States. By February 16, 1903, Frederic René Coudert, Jr., an international law attorney from New York, who launched the Downes v. Bidwell case for clients protesting tariffs levied on goods shipped between Puerto Rico and the United States, joined Paul Fuller, Charles E. LeBarbier and Degetau in the Gonzalez case as a collaborator.

The case, which became known as Gonzales v. Williams, was argued in the U.S. Supreme Court on December 4 and 7, 1903, with Chief Justice Melville Weston Fuller presiding. The case sparked administrative, legal, and media discussions about the status of Puerto Ricans. It also questioned the issues of immigration and U.S. doctrines in the treatment of U.S. citizens, chiefly women and people of color (dark-skinned). González and her lawyers moved among the legal realms, aided by shared languages of race, gender, and morality, while the U.S. solicitor general Henry M. Hoyt, focused on what he considered were failed parents, rearing children outside moral, economically self-sufficient homes.

González, who was out on bond, secretly married her fiancé and thus became "a citizen of this country through marriage", and acquired the right to remain stateside. Despite being able to end her appeal, she instead decided to press the claim that all Puerto Ricans were U.S. citizens.

On January 4, 1904, the Court determined that under the immigration laws, González was not an alien, and therefore could not be denied entry into New York. The court, however declined to declare that she was a U.S. citizen. The question of the citizenship status of the inhabitants of the new island territories, and their situation remained confusing, ambiguous, and contested. Puerto Ricans came to be known as something in between: "noncitizen nationals".

== Aftermath ==
González had five children. She married Juan Francisco Torres on November 17, 1915, and stayed in New York until the 1930s when they moved to New Jersey (1930 Cranford Township NJ Census). She actively pursued the cause of U.S. citizenship for all Puerto Ricans because she believed that if the people of Puerto Rico were deceived out of one honorable status—Spanish citizenship—the United States was obliged to extend Puerto Ricans a new honorable status—U.S. citizenship. She wrote published letters in The New York Times that the decision and surrounding events of her case revealed that the United States failed to treat Puerto Ricans honorably, breaking promises to them and marking them as inferior to "full-fledged American citizens". González wrote the following:

"Gen. Miles went to Porto Rico to save us, and proclaimed to the wide winds his 'liberating' speech." But instead of U.S. citizenship, Puerto Ricans got "the actual (current) incongruous status—'neither Americans nor foreigners,' as it was vouchsafed by the United States Supreme Court apropos of my detention at Ellis Island for the crime of being an 'alien.'"

Federico Degetau traveled to Washington, D.C., as Puerto Rico's first "Resident Commissioner", or nonvoting representative. He dedicated himself to the struggle to gain U.S. citizenship for all Puerto Ricans.

Frederic René Coudert, Jr. became a member of the State Senate from 1939 to 1946 and was elected as a Republican to the Eightieth and to the five succeeding United States Congresses (January 3, 1947 – January 3, 1959; was not a candidate for the 86th Congress).

== Legacy ==
González's struggle was not in vain. In 1917, the United States Congress passed the Jones-Shafroth Act which conferred a statutory United States citizenship on all the citizens of Puerto Rico, This meant that the citizenship was not guaranteed by the Constitution. Two months later President Wilson signed a compulsory military service act which gave the United States the right to draft Puerto Ricans for military service in World War I. The act, which was signed into law by President Woodrow Wilson on March 2, 1917, also revised the system of the government in Puerto Rico. González moved to Cranford Township, New Jersey around 1930 with her husband Juan Francisco Torres. Her descendants went on to live in New Jersey, Florida, California and Colorado. She died on June 11, 1971, and is buried with her husband at Holy Cross Cemetery in North Arlington, New Jersey. Her great granddaughter, Belinda Torres-Mary, now actively pursues and maintains information regarding González's history and immigration struggle and is the keeper of the family documents.

== See also ==
- History of women in Puerto Rico
- Insular Cases
- List of Puerto Ricans
