= Tuaua v. United States =

Court case concerning citizenship of American Samoans

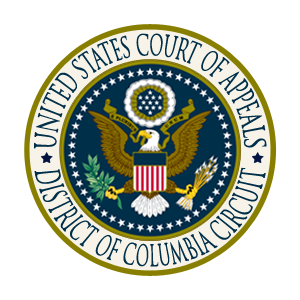
- Court: United States Court of Appeals for the District of Columbia Circuit
- Decided: June 5 2015

Holding
- People born in American Samoa are not entitled to birthright citizenship under the Fourteenth Amendment to the United States Constitution

Tuaua v. United States is a court case, originally filed in 2012, in which a group of American Samoans sued the State Department and the Obama administration. They sued to force the government to recognize American Samoans' birthright citizenship, arguing that the Fourteenth Amendment to the United States Constitution guarantees that anyone born in the United States is automatically granted citizenship.

== Background ==
The case originated as a complaint filed in 2012 in the U.S. District Court for the District of Columbia, by American Samoan and U.S. national Leneuoti Tuaua, who was prohibited from becoming a police officer in California because he was not a U.S. citizen.

The case was docketed in the U.S. Court of Appeals for the District of Columbia in 2013. Briefs were filed on May 12, 2014, and an oral argument was made on February 9, 2015. On June 5, 2015, the U.S. Court of Appeals for the District of Columbia ruled 3–0 to deny birthright citizenship to American Samoans, ruling that the guarantee of such citizenship to citizens in the Fourteenth Amendment does not apply to unincorporated U.S. territories.

On February 1, 2016, attorneys filed a petition requesting that the Supreme Court of the United States review the Appeals Court's decision.

On June 13, 2016, the Supreme Court denied certiorari, meaning the case will not be heard, and the lower court's ruling stands.

== Subsequent cases ==
In Fitisemanu v. United States, the U.S. Court of Appeals for the Tenth Circuit ruled 2–1 to reverse a lower court's decision that stated that American Samoans are entitled to birthright citizenship and to overturn the Insular Cases. Despite Justice Gorsuch showing his willingness to overrule the Insular Cases in his concurrence in United States v. Vaello Madero, the case was similarly denied certiorari on October 17, 2022.

== See also ==
- Pacific Islands Americans
- American Samoan citizenship and nationality
