= Foraker Act =

1900 US federal law regarding Puerto Rico

Organic Act of 1900
- Other short titles: Foraker Act
- Long title: An Act Temporarily to provide revenues and a civic government for Puerto Rico, and for other purposes
- Enacted by: the 56th United States Congress
- Effective: May 1, 1900

Citations
- Public law: Pub. L. 56–191
- Statutes at Large: 31 Stat. 77

Legislative history
- Introduced in the Senate by Joseph B. Foraker (R–OH); Signed into law by President William McKinley on April 12, 1900

United States Supreme Court cases
- Downes v. Bidwell 182 U.S. 244

The Foraker Act (Pub. L. 56–191, 31 Stat. 77, enacted April 12, 1900), officially called the Organic Act of 1900 and most commonly known by the name of its sponsor, Senator Joseph B. Foraker, (R-Ohio), is an organic act of the 56th United States Congress that was signed into law by President William McKinley on April 12, 1900, to take effect May 1, 1900. The Act replaced the military government of Puerto Rico, which was established by the United States after the annexation of the archipelago and island during the Spanish–American War in 1898, with a civil insular government under the continued federal jurisdiction of the United States as the local administration of an unincorporated territory. It served as the primary organic law for the government of Puerto Rico and its relation with the United States until it was superseded by the Jones–Shafroth Act of 1917.

The Foraker Act imposed tariffs imported into the United States from the territory and established a civil government in Puerto Rico modeled after the federal government of the United States. It divided the local government of the unincorporated territory into three branches: an executive, consisting of a Governor and an 11-member Executive Council appointed by the President of the United States, a legislative, composed of bicameral Legislative Assembly, with the Executive Council as its upper chamber and a 35-member House of Delegates elected by the residents of Puerto Rico as its lower chamber, and a judicial, headed by a chief justice and a district judge appointed by the President. The Act created the office of Resident Commissioner, a non-voting member to the United States House of Representatives elected by the residents of Puerto Rico. It also established Puerto Rican citizenship and extended American nationality to Puerto Ricans.

The Foraker Act extended some measure of local self-government to Puerto Rico with the creation of a popularly elected lower chamber of the legislative branch, but the preponderant control of the local government of Puerto Rico was retained by the United States through the authority of the President to appoint the entire executive branch and half of the legislative branch, and the power of the United States Congress to annul any law enacted by the legislative branch. However, the residents of Puerto Rico had some opportunity to influence executive policies through the five appointed members of the Executive Council, who were required to be native Puerto Ricans by the Act.

== Background: Foraker and Standard Oil ==
In 1900, while Senator Joseph B. Foraker presented the bill that would become the Foraker Act, the first organic law establishing civil government in Puerto Rico, he received a total of $44,000 in payments from Standard Oil Company. The relationship was documented in more than twenty letters between Foraker and Standard Oil vice president John D. Archbold, later published by William Randolph Hearst in 1912.

That same year, Foraker's annual Senate salary was $5,000. Historian Nieve de los Angeles Vazquez documents in El Jefe that the Standard Oil payments exceeded his Senate salary by nearly nine times in the year he designed Puerto Rico's civil governance framework.

== Synopsis ==
A brief summery of sections of the Foraker Act of 1900 is as follows:

2 Required that the same tariffs, customs, and duties be levied collected and paid upon all articles imported into Puerto Rico from ports other than those of the United States which are required by law to be collected upon importation into the United States from foreign countries.

3 Implemented a temporary tariff on goods transferred between Puerto Rico and the United States. This tariff was set to expire either upon the implementation of local taxation by the Legislature of Puerto Rico sufficient to "meet the necessities of the government" or on the first day of March 1902.

4 Provided that the tariff collected under section 2 would be placed into a fund and held in trust for the benefit of the people of Puerto Rico until the legislature was fully established. After the establishment of the new government, the funds would be transferred to the local treasury.

6 Established the capital of Puerto Rico as the city of San Juan and established that the seat of government would be maintained there.

7 Established that residents of Puerto Rico who were Spanish Citizens who decide to remain in Puerto Rico until the 11th day of April 1899 and their children would be considered citizens of Puerto Rico and be entitled to the protection of the United States. A provision was also made for residents who wanted to remain citizens of Spain.

11 Provided for the replacement of Spanish currency on the island with US Dollars. Also established that all debts previously payable in Puerto Rican currency would henceforth be payable with US Dollars.

13 Provided a mechanism to transfer all property held by the United States Government as ceded by Spain to the newly established government of Puerto Rico upon its establishment.

14 Established that the statutes of the United States would apply if applicable to the citizens of Puerto Rico with the exception of internal revenue laws.

15 Enabled the newly formed government to amend or repeal any law that was implemented in the course of the transition.

16 Established a judicial system similar to that of the United States and provided that all government officials take an oath to support both the constitution of the United States and the laws of Puerto Rico.

17 Established a chief executive with the title of governor who is appointed by the President of the United States with the advice and consent of the United States Senate for a term of four years.

18 Established an executive council for the Governor of Puerto Rico that is appointed by the President of the United States with the advice and consent of the United States Senate for a term of four years.

27 Established a bicameral legislative body with one house consisting of the executive council as established in 18 and the other consisting of 35 elected members serving a term of two years. The territory was to be split into seven districts.

28,29 Provided for the general election of members of the legislative body.

30 Established the requirements for office in the legislative body.

31 Defined the mechanisms by which bills become law. A bill can be proposed in either house but must be passed by a majority vote in both houses to become a law. A bill that is passed by both houses is presented to the Governor for his signature. Upon the signature of the governor, the bill becomes law. If the governor does not sign the bill or vetoes it, the legislature can override the veto with a 2/3rd majority vote. Requires that all bills passed by the legislative body be reported to the United States Congress and enables the United States Congress to annul them.

33 Provided for the transition of then existing court system unto the official court system. Provided for the nomination of the chief justice by the President of the United States with the advice and consent of the United States Senate.

34 Created the United States District of Puerto Rico and established a district judge to be appointed by the President of the United States with the advice and consent of the United States Senate for a term of four years.

38 Prevented export duties from being levied and collected. Provided that the legislative body may implement taxes for the general purposes of government, protecting the public credit, and reimbursing the United States government for funds expended out of the emergency fund of the War Department for relief of the industrial situation caused by the hurricane of August 8, 1899. Prevented the government of Puerto Rico and all of its municipalities from entering into debt in excess of seven percent of the aggregate tax value of its property.

39 Created the position of Resident Commissioner to the United States with a term of two years.

40 Created a three-member commission consisting of three citizens of Puerto Rico and appointed by the President of the United States with the advice and consent of the United States Senate. The commission was tasked to compile and revise the laws of Puerto Rico as well as the codes of procedure and systems of municipal government to provide for "a simple, harmonious, and economical government", establish justice and secure its prompt and efficient administration, inaugurate a general system of education and public instruction, provide buildings and funds therefore, equalize and simplify taxation and all the methods of raising revenue, and make all other provisions that may be necessary to secure and extend the benefits of a republican form of government to all the inhabitants of Puerto Rico. The final report of this committee was to be presented to the United States Congress within a year of the passing of the act.

== See also ==
- United States territorial courts
