= List of United States Supreme Court cases, volume 195 =

Supreme Court of the United States
- Interactive map of Supreme Court of the United States
- 38°53′26″N 77°00′16″W
- Established: March 4, 1789; 236 years ago
- Location: Washington, D.C.
- Coordinates: 38°53′26″N 77°00′16″W
- Composition method: Presidential nomination with Senate confirmation
- Authorised by: Constitution of the United States, Art. III, § 1
- Judge term length: life tenure, subject to impeachment and removal
- Number of positions: 9 (by statute)
- Website: supremecourt.gov

This is a list of cases reported in volume 195 of United States Reports, decided by the Supreme Court of the United States in 1904.

== Justices of the Supreme Court at the time of volume 195 U.S. ==
The Supreme Court is established by Article III, Section 1 of the Constitution of the United States, which says: "The judicial Power of the United States, shall be vested in one supreme Court . . .". The size of the Court is not specified; the Constitution leaves it to Congress to set the number of justices. Under the Judiciary Act of 1789 Congress originally fixed the number of justices at six (one chief justice and five associate justices). Since 1789 Congress has varied the size of the Court from six to seven, nine, ten, and back to nine justices (always including one chief justice).

When the cases in volume 195 were decided the Court comprised the following nine members:

Portrait	Justice	Office	Home State	Succeeded	Date confirmed by the Senate (Vote)	Tenure on Supreme Court
	Melville Fuller	Chief Justice	Illinois	Morrison Waite	July 20, 1888 (41–20)	October 8, 1888 – July 4, 1910 (Died)
	John Marshall Harlan	Associate Justice	Kentucky	David Davis	November 29, 1877 (Acclamation)	December 10, 1877 – October 14, 1911 (Died)
	David Josiah Brewer	Associate Justice	Kansas	Stanley Matthews	December 18, 1889 (53–11)	January 6, 1890 – March 28, 1910 (Died)
	Henry Billings Brown	Associate Justice	Michigan	Samuel Freeman Miller	December 29, 1890 (Acclamation)	January 5, 1891 – May 28, 1906 (Retired)
	Edward Douglass White	Associate Justice	Louisiana	Samuel Blatchford	February 19, 1894 (Acclamation)	March 12, 1894 – December 18, 1910 (Continued as chief justice)
	Rufus W. Peckham	Associate Justice	New York	Howell Edmunds Jackson	December 9, 1895 (Acclamation)	January 6, 1896 – October 24, 1909 (Died)
	Joseph McKenna	Associate Justice	California	Stephen Johnson Field	January 21, 1898 (Acclamation)	January 26, 1898 – January 5, 1925 (Retired)
	Oliver Wendell Holmes Jr.	Associate Justice	Massachusetts	Horace Gray	December 4, 1902 (Acclamation)	December 8, 1902 – January 12, 1932 (Retired)
	William R. Day	Associate Justice	Ohio	George Shiras Jr.	February 23, 1903 (Acclamation)	March 2, 1903 – November 13, 1922 (Retired)

== Citation style ==
Under the Judiciary Act of 1789 the federal court structure at the time comprised District Courts, which had general trial jurisdiction; Circuit Courts, which had mixed trial and appellate (from the US District Courts) jurisdiction; and the United States Supreme Court, which had appellate jurisdiction over the federal District and Circuit courts—and for certain issues over state courts. The Supreme Court also had limited original jurisdiction (i.e., in which cases could be filed directly with the Supreme Court without first having been heard by a lower federal or state court). There were one or more federal District Courts and/or Circuit Courts in each state, territory, or other geographical region.

The Judiciary Act of 1891 created the United States Courts of Appeals and reassigned the jurisdiction of most routine appeals from the district and circuit courts to these appellate courts. The Act created nine new courts that were originally known as the "United States Circuit Courts of Appeals." The new courts had jurisdiction over most appeals of lower court decisions. The Supreme Court could review either legal issues that a court of appeals certified or decisions of court of appeals by writ of certiorari.

Bluebook citation style is used for case names, citations, and jurisdictions.

- "# Cir." = United States Court of Appeals
  - e.g., "3d Cir." = United States Court of Appeals for the Third Circuit
- "C.C.D." = United States Circuit Court for the District of . . .
  - e.g.,"C.C.D.N.J." = United States Circuit Court for the District of New Jersey
- "D." = United States District Court for the District of . . .
  - e.g.,"D. Mass." = United States District Court for the District of Massachusetts
- "E." = Eastern; "M." = Middle; "N." = Northern; "S." = Southern; "W." = Western
  - e.g.,"C.C.S.D.N.Y." = United States Circuit Court for the Southern District of New York
  - e.g.,"M.D. Ala." = United States District Court for the Middle District of Alabama
- "Ct. Cl." = United States Court of Claims
- The abbreviation of a state's name alone indicates the highest appellate court in that state's judiciary at the time.
  - e.g.,"Pa." = Supreme Court of Pennsylvania
  - e.g.,"Me." = Supreme Judicial Court of Maine

== List of cases in volume 195 U.S. ==
Case Name	Page & year	Opinion of the Court	Concurring opinion(s)	Dissenting opinion(s)	Lower Court	Disposition
Bradley v. Lightcap I	1 (1904)	Fuller	none	none	Ill.	reversed
Bradley v. Lightcap II	24 (1904)	Fuller	none	none	Ill.	reversed
Bradley v. Lightcap III	25 (1904)	Fuller	none	none	C.C.N.D. Ill.	affirmed
McCray v. United States	27 (1904)	White	none	none	S.D. Ohio	affirmed
Schick v. United States	65 (1904)	Brewer	none	Harlan	N.D. Ill.	affirmed
Kepner v. United States	100 (1904)	Day	none	Holmes, Brown	Phil.	reversed
Dorr v. United States	138 (1904)	Day	Peckham	Harlan	Phil.	affirmed
Mendezona y Mendezona v. United States	158 (1904)	Day	none	none	Phil.	reversed
Cliff v. United States	159 (1904)	Brewer	none	none	N.D. Ill.	affirmed
Stevenson v. Fain	165 (1904)	Fuller	none	none	6th Cir.	dismissed
Schweer v. Brown	171 (1904)	Fuller	none	none	E.D. Ark.	dismissed
Amado v. United States	172 (1904)	Harlan	none	none	D.P.R.	dismissed
Crawford v. Burke	176 (1904)	Brown	none	none	Ill.	reversed
Aikens v. Wisconsin	194 (1904)	Holmes	none	White	Wis.	affirmed
Thomas v. Ohio State University	207 (1904)	Harlan	none	none	6th Cir.	certification
Wright v. Louisville and Nashville Railroad Company	219 (1904)	Holmes	none	none	5th Cir.	reversed
Dobbins v. City of Los Angeles	223 (1904)	Day	none	none	Cal.	reversed
Daly v. Elton	242 (1904)	Day	none	none	Cal.	reversed
Bradford v. Southern Railway Company	243 (1904)	Fuller	none	none	6th Cir.	certification
New v. Oklahoma	252 (1904)	Fuller	none	none	Sup. Ct. Terr. Okla.	dismissed
National Exchange Bank of Tiffin v. Wiley	257 (1904)	Harlan	none	none	Neb.	affirmed
Kaufman v. Tredway	271 (1904)	Brewer	none	none	Pa. Super. Ct.	reversed
Fayerweather v. Ritch	276 (1904)	Brewer	none	none	C.C.S.D.N.Y.	affirmed
Patterson v. Hewitt	309 (1904)	Brown	none	none	Sup. Ct. Terr. N.M.	affirmed
Metropolitan Railroad Company v. District of Columbia	322 (1904)	White	none	none	D.C. Cir.	affirmed
Olsen v. Smith	332 (1904)	White	none	none	Tex. Civ. App.	affirmed
Birkett v. Columbia Bank	345 (1904)	McKenna	none	none	N.Y. Sup. Ct.	affirmed
City of Seattle v. Kelleher	351 (1904)	Holmes	none	none	C.C.D. Wash.	reversed
The Blackheath	361 (1904)	Holmes	Brown	none	S.D. Ala.	reversed
Citizens' National Bank v. Donnell	369 (1904)	Holmes	none	none	Mo.	affirmed
Baltimore Shipbuilding and Dry Dock Company v. City of Baltimore	375 (1904)	Holmes	none	none	Md.	affirmed
Helena Water Works Company v. City of Helena	383 (1904)	Day	none	none	9th Cir.	affirmed
Hill v. McCord	395 (1904)	Brewer	none	none	Wis.	affirmed
Cramer v. Wilson	408 (1904)	Brown	none	none	Ill.	affirmed
United States v. Thomas	418 (1904)	Brown	none	none	Ct. Cl.	reversed
Lockhart v. Leeds	427 (1904)	Peckham	none	none	Sup. Ct. Terr. N.M.	reversed
Northern Pacific Railroad Company v. American Trading Company	439 (1904)	Peckham	none	none	2d Cir.	affirmed
United States v. Martinez	469 (1904)	Day	none	White	Ct. Cl.	reversed
Humbird v. Avery	480 (1904)	Harlan	none	none	8th Cir.	affirmed
City of San Juan v. St John's Gas Company	510 (1904)	White	none	none	D.P.R.	reversed
United States v. Chicago, et al. Railway Company	524 (1904)	Peckham	none	none	8th Cir.	affirmed
Western Union Telegraph Company v. Pennsylvania Railroad Company	540 (1904)	McKenna	Brewer	Harlan	3d Cir.	affirmed
Ex parte Republic of Colombia	604 (1904)	Holmes	none	none	C.C.N.D.W. Va.	mandamus denied
Bullis v. O'Beirne	606 (1904)	Day	none	none	N.Y. Sup. Ct.	affirmed

== See also ==
- Certificate of division
