= Savage (pejorative term) =

Pejorative term describing someone uncivilized

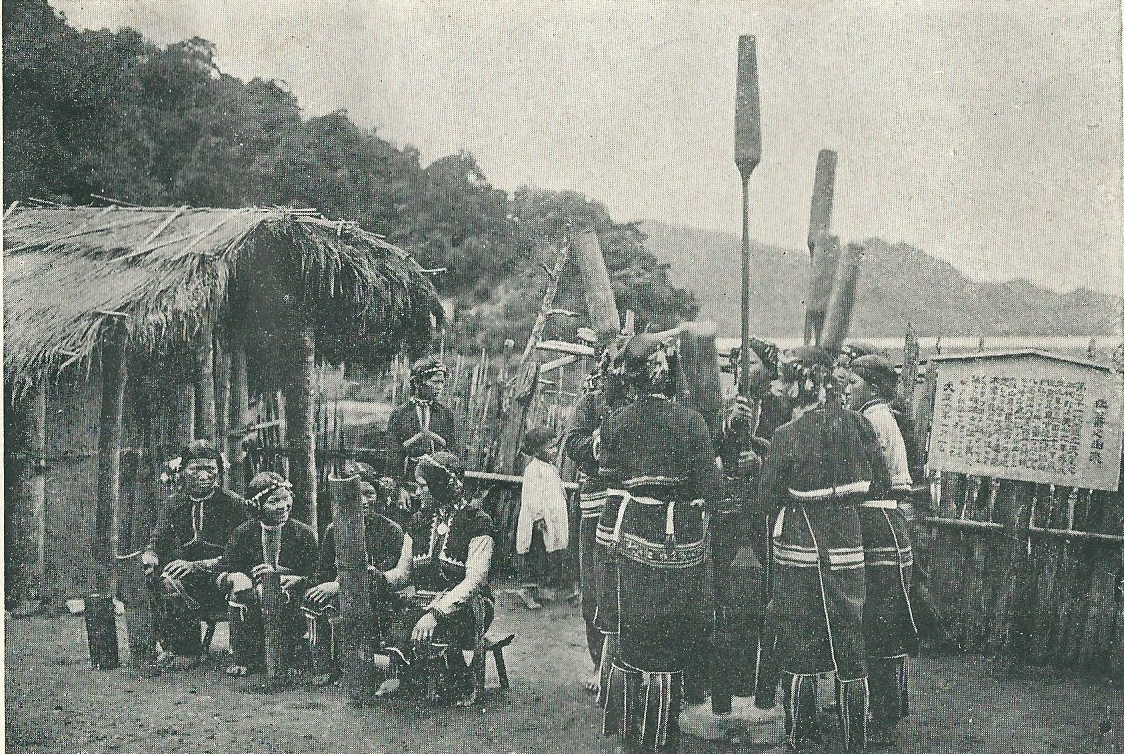
Taiwanese indigenous peoples in Japanese Taiwan, from a 1926 book titled The Savage Tribes of Formosa

Savage is a derogatory term to describe a person or people the speaker regards as primitive and uncivilized. It has predominantly been used to refer to Indigenous, tribal, and nomadic peoples. Sometimes a legal, military, and ethnic term, it has shifted in meaning since its first usages in the 16th century.

Between the 16th and 19th centuries, the term was most commonly applied to American Indians. According to the National Museum of the American Indian, the word "served to justify the taking of Native lands, sometimes by treaty and other times through coercion or conquest."

American politicians more recently have used the term savage to refer to those affiliated with Nazism, Communism, and terrorism.

During the 16th century, the noble savage, a romanticized literary archetype, emerged in Western anthropology, philosophy, and literature. The stock character symbolizes the mythical innate goodness and moral superiority of a character in tune with nature and uncorrupted by civilization.

== English usage ==
=== British usage ===
An 1874 passage from Ecce Veritas epitomizes the overlap between the use of "savage" and eugenicist, white supremacist, and Social Darwinist views:

...the prevailing [natural] law seems to be — "once a savage always a savage." Like the Red Indians and nomads generally, we may extirpate but can never civilise them. Science declares, as does Mr. Darwin, that the earlier races of mankind were barbarous; ... it is the superior races that have thrust out the older and inferior, supplanting them as if by uniform law.

The 1884 English pamphlet titled Can the independent chiefs of savage tribes cede to any private individual the whole or a part of their states...? counterposes "European" and "Christian" nations with "nomads and savages" from "feeble races", including Native North Americans, Syrian Bedouins, Iraqi Turkmen, and Central Africans including the Kongo people.

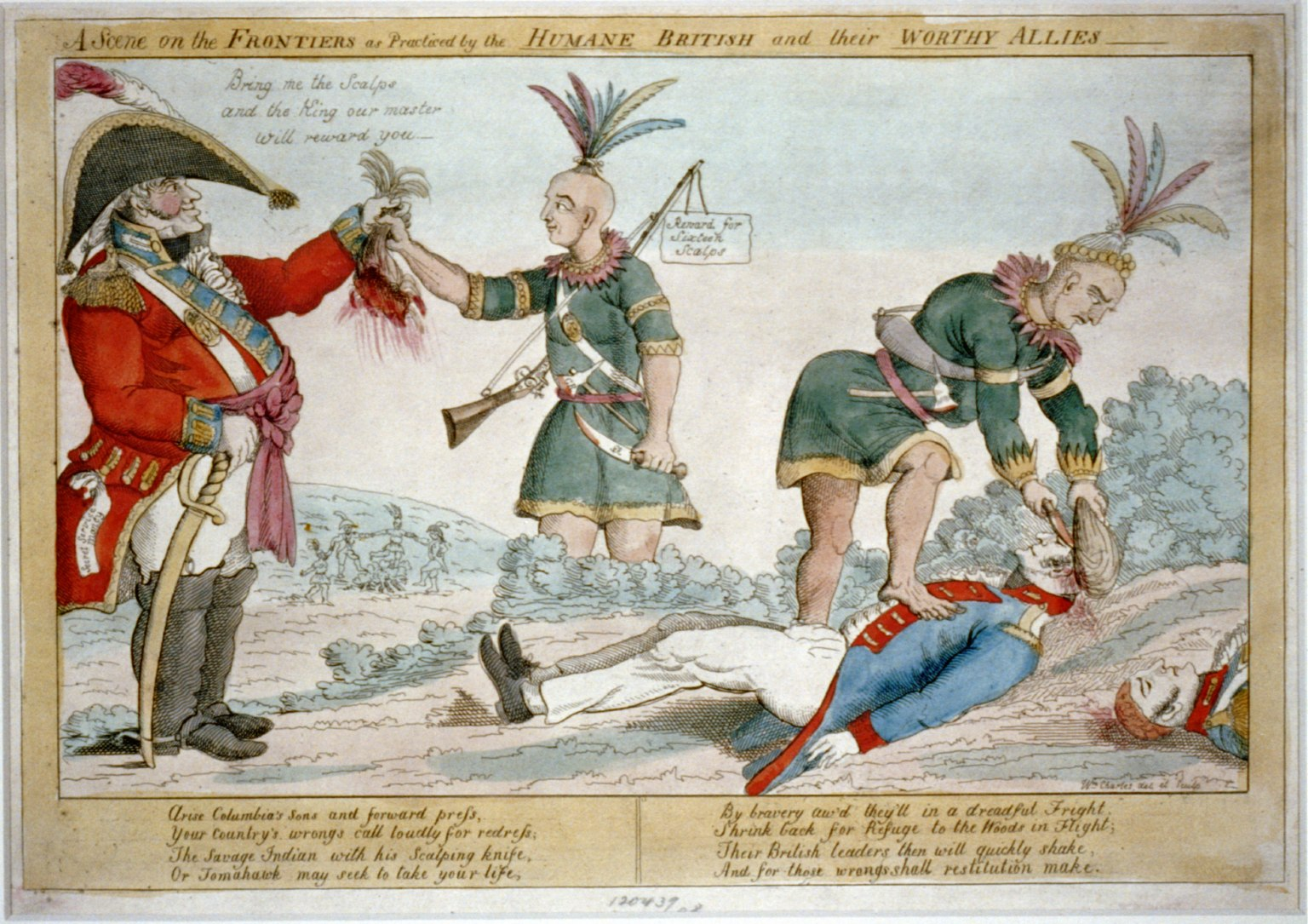
1812 American propaganda poster, poeticizing the British alliance with the "savage Indian" during the War of 1812 and demonstrating scalping

=== American usage ===
In the 1776 United States Declaration of Independence, Thomas Jefferson describes Native Americans as "merciless Indian Savages, whose known rule of warfare, is undistinguished destruction of all ages, sexes and conditions".

The 1873 Reports of the Committee of Investigation sent by the Mexican Government to the Frontier of Texas contains 76 uses of the term "savages", possibly in reference to Tejanos.

The 1899 book The Dark Continent...At Our Doors by Christian evangelist Emilio Dolsson compares the continent of South America with the continent of Africa under the heading "Among the Savage Tribes."

==== American territories ====
In 1901, the US Supreme Court described inhabitants of its recently acquired territories — Guam, Puerto Rico, and the Philippines — as "savage tribes" as part of the Insular Cases' DeLima v. Bidwell ruling. In 2023, the ACLU condemned this language, stating it was a method of denying "millions of people...certain constitutional rights and protections", which "showed obvious contempt for the predominately Asian, Black, Indigenous, Latine, and Pacific Islander residents of these territories". The ACLU claimed this continues to contribute to systemic racism today.

==== During the Vietnam War ====
The American military used the term used to describe Viet Cong soldiers. During a 1971 court hearing, American airborne ranger Robert Bowie Johnson Jr. stated, "It is like there are savages out there, there are gooks out there. In the same way we slaughtered the Indian's buffalo, we would slaughter the water buffalo in Vietnam". He claimed soldiers also used the term "Indian country" to refer to free-fire zones in South Vietnam.

==== War on terror ====
The day after the 9/11 attacks on September 11, 2001, president George W. Bush declared a war on terror.

On an address to the Judiciary Committee on September 24, 2001, Attorney General John Ashcroft reiterated the description of the US as "the civil" and terrorists as "the savage":

[The] attacks of September 11 drew a bright line of demarcation between the civil and the savage, and our nation will never be the same...Today I call upon Congress to act to strengthen our ability to fight this evil wherever it exists, and to ensure that the line between the civil and the savage, so brightly drawn on September 11, is never crossed again.

In 2020, Jérôme Viala-Gaudefroy of the Université Sorbonne Nouvelle drew a correlation between "The Evil Savage Other as Enemy in Modern U.S. Presidential Discourse", claiming the "savage Other" has been defined as "American Indians of the Frontier, the British during the American Revolution, the immigrants in the early 20th century, the Nazis, the Communists, and more recently...terrorists". Viala-Gaudefroy claims this same strategy was employed to prepare the American public for the Iraq War and to increase support for Trumpism.

In 2023, the National Park System's Advisory Committee on Reconciliation in Place Names stated their belief that "all instances of 'savage' should be removed from lands, including geographic features". The committee wrote that the term "has a historic derogatory association with Native Americans".

== In popular culture ==
Citing 1922 Wild West Weekly illustrations, Bowling Green State University claims that, "Historically and today, representations of Native American men have frequently relied on stereotypes of violence, savagery, or primitivism".

The 1995 Disney animated film Pocahontas features a song devoted to the term, in which both the English colonists and the Powhatan tribe members use the term against the other.

Beginning in about 2008, the term became an American slang term meaning "bad-ass, cool, and violent".

In 2019, while browsing orange shirts to honor Native victims of residential schools for Canada's National Day for Truth and Reconciliation, a teacher at Harrison Trimble High School in Moncton came across an orange shirt which read "Savage est. 1998". Sold by retailer Urban Planet, the orange shirt's text was framed by a white-and-black circular design. This paralleled the NDTR's Every Child Matters shirt, designed by artist Andy Everson of the K'ómoks First Nation. The Every Child Matters shirt was designed for nonprofits, to honor "the thousands of children who died in the federally funded, church-run boarding schools", but was frequently misappropriated by non-charitable groups. Douglas Stewart, a teacher of the Sylix/Okanagan Nation, pointed out the similarities and told CBC News, "It's important to understand that for Indigenous people, this word is our N-word". The assistant manager of the Fredericton Urban Planet agreed that the word should be removed from its clothing, stating, "It's affected Indigenous people for hundreds of years; it still affects them. It would be the same as any other racial slurs printed and then sold in stores".

In 2020, a clothing company and a restaurant changed its name along with public apologies regarding their usages of the term. VII Apparel Company, formerly Savage Apparel, wrote:

It feels as if the word has been completely separated from its racist past — and that belief made us feel justified...But despite its origins, it is an indisputable fact that the word savage was used as a racial slur to describe Native American and Indigenous people...And recognizing that fact is what ultimately brought us to the decision to change our name.

The restaurant SHIFT (formerly named Savage) in St. Louis, Missouri issued an apology the same year, stating the term has "a troubled history and it was a mistake to celebrate that" and described themselves as "truly sorry".

== International usage ==
In 2004, Pakistani al-Qaeda CEO Mohammad Hasan Khalil al-Hakim published Management of Savagery (also translated as Administration of Savagery) which described a strategy for Islamic extremists to create a new Islamic caliphate.

In 2015, the European Union funded a "Savage Warfare" project, using the term to apply to British and American colonial campaigns between 1885 and 1914. Funded for €269 857,80, the project aimed to "reconfigure how historians debate Europe’s colonial past, as well as influence current popular interpretations of this crucial period of world history".

== See also ==
- Indian giver
