= Insular Cases =

Series of U.S. Supreme Court cases

The Insular Cases are a series of opinions by the Supreme Court of the United States in 1901 pertaining to the status of U.S. territories acquired in the Spanish–American War. The term "insular" refers to the territories that were islands administered by the War Department's Bureau of Insular Affairs. Today, the legal rulings outlined in the Insular Cases continue to govern the United States' territories of Puerto Rico, Guam, American Samoa, the U.S. Virgin Islands, and the Commonwealth of the Northern Mariana Islands.

In one of the cases, the Court established the landmark doctrine of territorial incorporation. This doctrine is the legal principle that makes distinctions on where the Constitution applies in regards to non-contiguous territories of the United States. Incorporated territories are those that the United States Congress deems on a path to statehood, and where the Constitution is applied fully. Alaska and Hawaii were former incorporated territories that are now admitted into the statehood. On the contrary, unincorporated territories are not on track to statehood, and thus, effectively allowed for the Constitution to apply differently.

Many legal scholars such as José Julián Álvarez González and Christina Burnett refer to the Insular Cases as a constitutional justification for colonialism and annexation of places not within United States boundaries. The Insular Cases "authorized the colonial regime created by Congress, which allowed the United States to continue its administration—and exploitation—of the territories acquired from Spain after the Spanish–American War." These Supreme Court rulings allowed for the United States government to extend unilateral power over these newly acquired territories.

Moreover, the Insular Cases are widely considered racist. The Downes v. Bidwell case called the people of the Insular areas "alien races" and the DeLima v. Bidwell ruling termed them "savage tribes". Downes further claimed that "the administration of government and justice according to Anglo-Saxon principles may for a time be impossible". The District Court of the Virgin Islands has since repudiated the cases' "racist doctrine" and the era's "intrinsically racist imperialism".

== Background ==
In 1898, the United States signed the Treaty of Paris (which entered into force on April 11, 1899), which ended the Spanish–American War and granted the United States sovereignty over the Philippines, Puerto Rico, and Guam. Additionally, Cuba remained under the jurisdiction of the United States Military Government until its independence on May 20, 1902.

The acquisition of the former Spanish colonies prompted debate in the United States about how the former Spanish land would be governed. The United States had to answer the question of whether or not people in newly acquired territories were citizens, a question the country had never faced before. The answer came from the Insular Cases, which responded to the question of how American constitutional rights apply to those in United States territories. The Supreme Court held that full constitutional protection of rights does not automatically (or ex proprio vigore—i.e., of its own force) extend to all places under American control. This meant that inhabitants of unincorporated territories such as Puerto Rico—"even if they are U.S. citizens"—may lack some constitutional rights (e.g., the right to remain part of the United States in case of de-annexation) because they were not part of the United States.

In 1900, Congress passed the Foraker Act, which established governmental structure in Puerto Rico. It allowed the United States to appoint the governor, a portion of the legislature, and the entirety of the Puerto Rico Supreme Court. The act also imposed taxes and duties collected on goods imported from the United States to Puerto Rico. This raised serious constitutionality issues, and formed the legal basis of the Insular Cases.

In addition to the Foraker Act, the Citizenship Clause found in the Fourteenth Amendment of the United States Constitution informed the Insular Cases decisions. Scholar Lisa Marie Perez writes in the Virginia Law Review that "[t]he Citizenship Clause of the Fourteenth Amendment provides that 'All persons born or naturalized in the United States, and subject to the jurisdiction thereof, are citizens of the United States.'" However, the Insular Cases soon set a precedent that the territories are not inherently part of the United States and therefore, the Citizenship Clause or other portions of the United States Constitution do not automatically apply. Furthermore, the Citizenship Clause was crucial throughout the 1800s in the United States, as both the country and citizenship expanded. Soon, the precedent from the Insular Cases became very different from early interpretations of the Citizenship Clause.

== List of the Insular Cases ==
Many legal scholars and jurists have listed what they consider are the legitimate constituents of the Insular Cases.

Juan R. Torruella, a judge on the U.S. Court of Appeals for the First Circuit (the federal appeals court with jurisdiction over the Federal Court for the District of Puerto Rico), considers that the landmark decisions consist of six fundamental cases only, all decided in 1901: "strictly speaking the Insular Cases are the original six opinions issued concerning acquired territories as a result of the 1898 Treaty of Paris". These six cases were:

- DeLima v. Bidwell, 182 U.S. 1 (1901); Argued: January 8–11, 1901; Decided: May 27, 1901
- Goetze v. United States, 182 U.S. 221 (1901); Argued: December 17–20, 1900; January 14–15, 1901; Decided: May 27, 1901
- Dooley v. United States, 182 U.S. 222 (1901); Argued: January 8–11, 1901. Decided: May 27, 1901
- Armstrong v. United States, 182 U.S. 243 (1901); Argued: January 8–11, 1901; Decided: May 27, 1901
- Downes v. Bidwell, 182 U.S. 244 (1901); Argued: January 8–11, 1901; Decided: May 27, 1901
- Huus v. New York and Porto Rico Steamship Co., 182 U.S. 392 (1901); Argued: January 11, 14, 1901; Decided: May 27, 1901

Another jurist, José Trías Monge, former Chief Justice of the Puerto Rico Supreme Court, states that the list also includes these additional two cases also decided in 1901:

- Dooley v. United States, 183 U.S. 151 (1901)
- Fourteen Diamond Rings v. United States, 183 U.S. 176 (1901); Argued: December 17–20, 1900. Decided: December 2, 1901

Law professor Pedro A. Malavet wrote in his book America's Colony: The Political and Cultural Conflict Between the United States and Puerto Rico, that while many law experts include cases from 1903 to 1979, some scholars limit the number of cases in the list to just nine, adding Crossman v. United States, 182 U.S. 221 (1901).

The U.S. Congress passed a resolution that collected the relevant records, briefs, and oral arguments of the 1901 cases concerning the U.S. Territories. In the compilation, the cases considered at the time of their decision as the Insular Cases were DeLima, Goetze, Dooley, Dooley, Armstrong, Downes, Crossman, and Huus.

Six of the nine Insular Cases deal exclusively with Puerto Rico.

Constitutional law professor Efrén Rivera-Ramos argues that the "Insular Cases" designation has been extended beyond the first nine cases in 1901 to include additional cases decided between 1903 and 1914:

- Hawaii v. Mankichi, 190 U.S. 197 (1903)
- Gonzales v. Williams, 192 U.S. 1 (1904)
- Kepner v. United States, 195 U.S. 100 (1904)
- Dorr v. United States, 195 U.S. 138 (1904)
- Mendozana v. United States, 195 U.S. 158 (1904)
- Rasmussen v. United States, 197 U.S. 516 (1905)
- Trono v. United States, 199 U.S. 521 (1905)
- Grafton v. United States, 206 U.S. 333 (1907)
- Kent v. Porto Rico, 207 U.S. 113 (1907)
- Kopel v. Bingham, 211 U.S. 468 (1909)
- Dowdell v. United States, 221 U.S. 325 (1911)
- Ochoa v. Hernández, 230 U.S. 139 (1913)
- Ocampo v. United States, 234 U.S. 91 (1914)

Some include the later Supreme Court rulings of:

- Balzac v. Porto Rico, 258 U.S. 298 (1922)
- Dorr v. United States, 195 U.S. 138 (1904)

In Balzac, the Supreme Court found that Puerto Ricans, who were granted statutory citizenship through the Jones Act (1917), are not guaranteed a trial by jury, an inherent aspect of the United States Constitution. Similarly, in Dorr v. United States (1904), the Supreme Court ruled against right to trial by jury for Philippines residents. These two cases reiterate the idea established in the Insular Cases; the Constitution does not automatically extend to territories ex proprio vigore, or by its own force.

== Doctrine of incorporation ==
An instrumental part of the Insular Cases is the creation of a doctrine that allows the United States to acquire and govern non-contiguous territories. The most important doctrinal lines from the Insular Cases include the idea of incorporated and unincorporated territories, and the overarching principle that the Constitution does not inherently extend to unincorporated territories.

Downes v. Bidwell (1901) created the distinction between incorporated and unincorporated territories. The former is on path to statehood, while the latter is not. The Supreme Court came to this decision by examining Congress' right to impose tariffs on states and territories. Legal scholar Bartholomew Sparrow writes that in Downes v. Bidwell, "the Court found that Congress could tax trade between Puerto Rico and the states. Puerto Rico was thus not a part of the United States for tariff purposes—contrary to the Uniformity Clause." Although the Uniformity Clause states that Congress must enforce tariffs equally throughout the United States, the Supreme Court created a distinction between territories that were fully part of the union and those that were not, allowing them to ignore the Uniformity Clause.

Justice Edward Douglas White described the incorporated territories as "an integral part of the United States," and on the likely path towards statehood. On the other hand, he described unincorporated territories as "appurtenant" to the United States, and "foreign... in the domestic sense." After this ruling, Puerto Rico, Guam, and the Philippines became unincorporated territories. With this new legal establishment, the Court also found that in these said territories, the Constitution "did not apply in full". Instead, it could be extended at Congress' discretion. The lines of reasoning from Downes v. Bidwell created legal precedent for the remainder of the Insular Cases.

In DeLima v. Bidwell (1901), the Supreme Court found "Puerto Rico was part of the United States for the purpose of the Uniformity Clause." Therefore, duties could not be collected from Puerto Rico. The Supreme Court set alternative precedents in Downes v. Bidwell and DeLima v. Bidwell based on the differing interpretation of the Uniformity Clause of the United States Constitution and the subsequent implications of these rulings.

== Political debate ==
The Insular Cases came at a time when America was building and expanding its empire. Throughout history, empire-building and colonial expansion have been a contentious topic. The reaction within the United States to the Insular decisions was no different, with both supporters and dissenters voicing their opinions. In Downes, Justice Henry Brown claimed that the United States should be able to possess the same power over the insular territories that Spain had. Scholar Krishanti Vigarajah argues that this allowed the insular territories to be seen as satellite colonies, and for the United States to exert colonial-style rule. This was controversial, due to the idea that the founding anti-colonial values of the United States were not compatible with exertion of colonial power.

The political debate surrounding the Insular Cases was split between expansionists and anti-expansionists, which largely followed Democratic-Republican party lines. Following the American Civil War and preceding the Spanish-American War, the Reconstruction Constitution that had guaranteed any inhabitants of American annexed territories the full benefit of United States citizenship and ultimate statehood. Historian Sam Erman notes that the strength of the Reconstruction Constitution had become weakened by the time of the Insular Cases, as a result of Southern Democrats' efforts to disenfranchise African-Americans in the South, and Republicans' waning support for Reconstruction measures.

For anti-expansionists, this discouraged overseas territorial acquisition during reconstruction by guaranteeing any annexed territories' eventual statehood and its people the full rights of citizenship.

Expansionists wished to separate U.S. action from the behavior of Spain, whose colonialism they viewed as motivated only by commercial interests and a continued desire to subjugate. The United States presented its own imperial ambitions as a path to liberation for former colonial subjects and an opportunity to gain republican government and modernity. However, expansionists also had to contend with questions about how to expand U.S. borders without extending citizenship to those they considered "alien".

== American reaction ==
Scholar Bartholomew Sparrow notes that almost all of the Insular Case opinions were 5–4 within the Supreme Court, demonstrating the contentious nature of the topic even from the highest voice of law in the United States. In Downes v. Bidwell (1901), the Supreme Court reached a decision after "one of the most spirited discussions ever held within the sacred circle of the Supreme Court bench." Reactions to the Insular Cases also exemplify the divide that existed at the time in the United States government surrounding empire building.

Sparrow notes that Republicans found that "the decision is a complete vindication of the position held by the Republican party with respect to the power of Congress to legislate for Porto Rico and the Philippines." Republicans not only favored expansion, but authored the Foraker Act. Additionally, John K. Richards, who as Solicitor General argued several of the cases for the government, said that "they sustain to the fullest extent the so-called insular policy of the administration. The government now has the sanction of the Supreme Court for governing these islands as their needs require."

Despite support from Republicans, many former representatives spoke in opposition about the rulings. Former Maine Congressman Charles E. Littlefield wrote in the Harvard Law Review that "the Insular Cases, in the manner in which the results were reached, the incongruity of the results, and the variety of inconsistent views expressed by the different members of the court, are, I believe, without parallel in our judicial history." Additionally, former US Senator and Representative George S. Boutwell commented that "the opinion of the majority seems to justify the conclusion that the power of acquiring territories is an indefinite power." Thus, the divisive nature of the Insular decisions was revealed through the opinions held by those active in government.

Outside of the government, the announcement of the Downes v. Bidwell decision in 1901 displayed the interest the American public had in the outcome of the case. Newspapers around the country also took great interest in the outcome of the Insular Cases, and many were highly critical of the decisions. The New York Herald wrote that the Supreme Court "by a bare majority of one holds that the constitution is supreme only in the States, and that a million square miles, or one-fourth of the national domain, and ten million people are subject to no law but the will of Congress." Furthermore, The Denver Post exclaimed the "Downes decision 'at one fell swoop' brought the United States 'into the ownership of colonies and putting us into the rank of land grabbing nations of Europe.'"

== Scholarly criticism ==
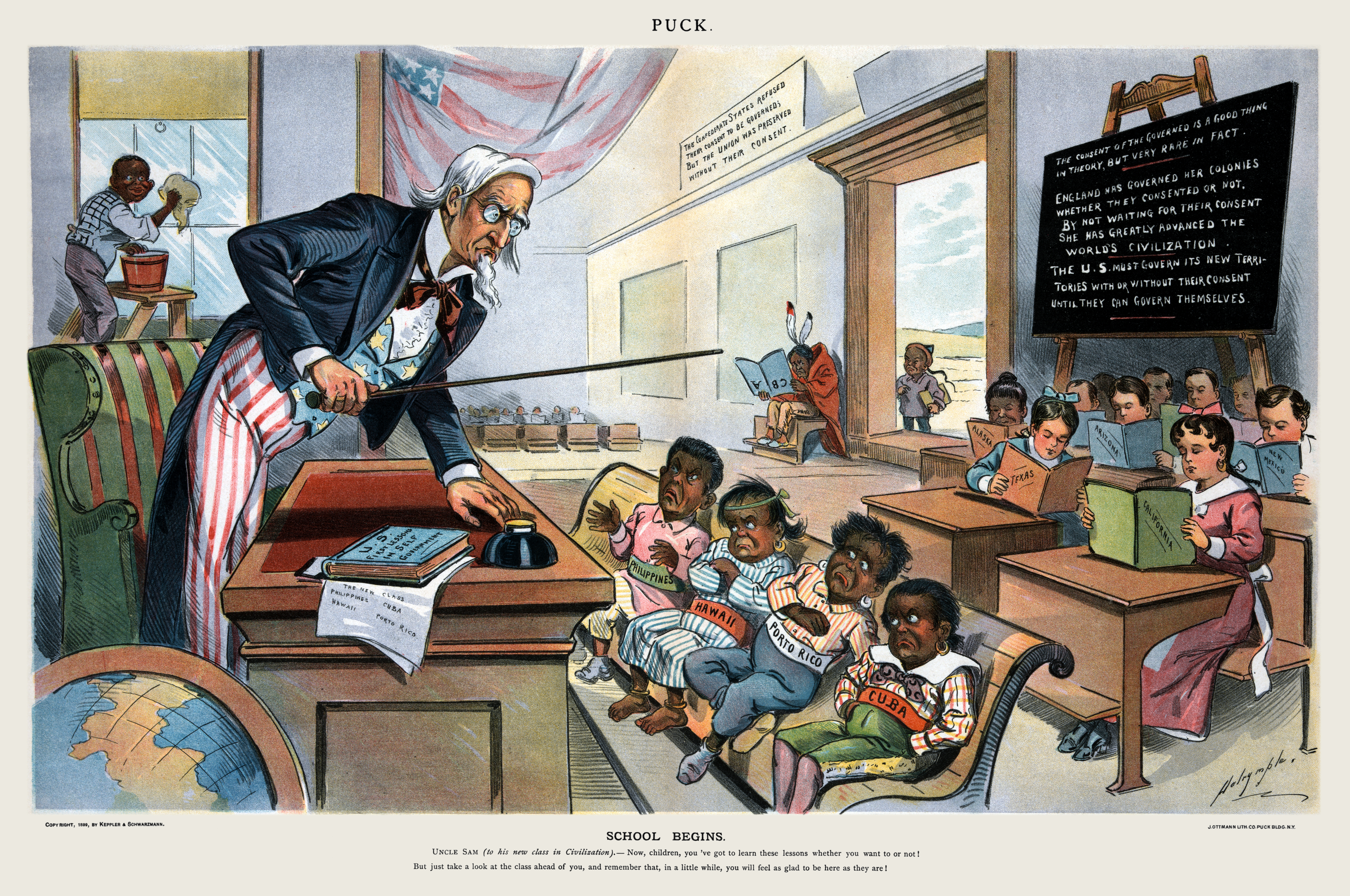
The Insular Cases drew unabashedly on ideas of racial inferiority. (Puck cartoon, 1899)

It is now commonly acknowledged that the decisions made in the Insular Cases were influenced by racist ideas of the period. Scholar Rick Baldoz notes that American political "anxieties about immigration, race, and economic competition" strongly influenced the debate surrounding the Insular Cases.

Downes and DeLima have been criticized for their inconsistency, and the alternative precedents sent in each one, in which Puerto Rico was first defined in Downes as not a "foreign country" but defined in DeLima as not part of the United States.

The Insular Cases have also been criticized for having been inconsistent in application between the two largest insular territories, the Philippines and Puerto Rico. Puerto Rico was seen as "an important geo-strategic asset" for emerging U.S. imperialism and a gateway to Latin America, while insular control over the Philippines was a "temporary attachment born of political expediency". This was attributed to the relative geographic proximity of the two nations, and the relative commercial capabilities of each at the time.

Notably, American beliefs about race at the time also characterized the difference in treatment between Puerto Rico and the Philippines. Puerto Ricans were more likely to be viewed as white by Americans than Filipinos were. However, both Puerto Ricans and Filipinos were seen as too "alien" to be considered for U.S. citizenship and statehood, unlike other former U.S. territories that had achieved statehood. This has been criticized by scholar Mark Weiner as "Teutonic Constitutionalism".

Writing in 2001, former Puerto Rico Supreme Court Chief Justice José Trías Monge contends that the Insular Cases were based on premises that would be legally and politically unacceptable in the 21st century, premises such as:

- Democracy and colonialism are "fully compatible".
- There is "nothing wrong when a democracy such as the United States engages in the business of governing other" subjects that have not participated in their democratic election process.
- People are not created equal, some races being superior to others.
- It is the "burden of the superior peoples, the white man's burden, to bring up others in their image, except to the extent that the nation which possesses them should in due time determine".

Scholar Krishanti Vignarajah has also argued that the Court's decisions in the Insular Cases could have been considered judicial overreach. They were initially considered a political issue, and the Treaty of Paris specified that "the civil rights and political status of the native inhabitants of the territories ... shall be determined by the Congress", but was later transformed into a legitimate judicial issue. This set a new standard for judicial involvement in issues of international affairs.

== Judicial criticism and later challenges ==
In Harris v. Rosario, 446 U.S. 651 (1980), the Court applied Califano v. Torres, 435 U.S. 1 (1978) in a succinct per curiam order, holding that less aid to Puerto Rican families with dependent children did not violate the Equal Protection Clause, because in U.S. territories Congress can discriminate against its citizens applying a rational basis review. Justice Thurgood Marshall wrote a staunch dissent, noting that Puerto Ricans are U.S. citizens and that the Insular Cases are questionable.

In Torres v. Puerto Rico, 442 U.S. 465 (1979), cited above, Justice William Brennan, with whom Justice Potter Stewart, Justice Marshall, and Justice Harry Blackmun joined, concurring in the judgment, cited Reid v. Covert, 354 U.S. 1, 14 (1957), in which Justice Hugo Black said the "concept that the Bill of Rights and other constitutional protections against arbitrary government are inoperative when they become inconvenient or when expediency dictates otherwise is a very dangerous doctrine and if allowed to flourish would destroy the benefit of a written Constitution and undermine the basis of our Government".

In United States v. Vaello Madero, No. 20-303, 596 U.S. ___ (2022), Justice Neil Gorsuch concurred and noted that "The Insular Cases have no foundation in the Constitution and rest instead on racial stereotypes. They deserve no place in our law." Gorsuch argues that the Court must find a case to overrule the Insular Cases which were "based on racist assumptions and imperial ambitions."

The Supreme Court had the opportunity to overturn the Insular Cases in the case of Fitisemanu v. United States, but in October 2022, denied certiorari. The United States Court of Appeals for the Tenth Circuit had ruled in this case that the Insular Cases should stand.

== Impact of the Insular Cases ==
The Philippines was recognized as an independent country in 1946, following World War II. Guam and Puerto Rico have remained unincorporated territories. Additionally, the U.S. has gained several other unincorporated territories, including American Samoa, the U.S. Virgin Islands, and the Commonwealth of the Northern Mariana Islands. The implications of the ruling extends to these territories as well.

For Puerto Rico, the outcomes of the Insular Cases laid a foundation for the modern "political question" of Puerto Rican status in relation to the United States, in which Puerto Ricans continue to be classified as alien. The incorporation doctrine's "uncertainty" has allowed U.S. courts the ability to discriminate against Puerto Rican plaintiffs on issues of individual welfare and entitlement into the current day.

In American Samoa, the Insular Cases serve as a mechanism for defense in further assimilating into the American way of life. Given its unincorporated status, its people lack full constitutional rights, including birthright citizenship. However, American Samoans believe that the full application of the Constitution affects their values and ways of life. The American Samoan government has even intervened in multiple lawsuits to defend the Insular Cases, despite the growing interest to overturn them.

The implications of the rulings affects every territory differently. The contrast between Puerto Rico and American Samoa reflect the surmounting pressure to balance interests on both sides.

The United States now has only one incorporated territory left: the United States Territory of Palmyra Island; a remote, uninhabited coral atoll in the middle of the Pacific Ocean. Palmyra had been part of the incorporated Territory of Hawaii until 1959, when Palmyra was deliberately excluded from the new State of Hawaii by the Hawaii Admission Act. Palmyra is left as a remnant of the old incorporated territory, therefore, the Constitution applies there in full.

Amy Kaplan argues that the Insular Cases helped create the legal backing of the Guantánamo Bay Detention Camp in Guantánamo, Cuba, where constitutional rights "remain indeterminate".

== Other cases ==
- Calero-Toledo v. Pearson Yacht Leasing Co., 416 U.S. 663 (1974)
- Examining Bd. v. Flores de Otero, 426 U.S. 572 (1976)
- Rodriguez v. Popular Democratic Party, 457 U.S. 1 (1982)
- Puerto Rico v. Sanchez Valle, No. 15-108, 579 U.S. ___ (2016)
- Puerto Rico v. Franklin California Tax-Free Trust, No. 15-233, 579 U.S. ___ (2016)
- Financial Oversight and Management Board for Puerto Rico v. Aurelius Investment, LLC, No. 18-1334, 590 U.S. ___ (2020)
- Financial Oversight and Management Board for Puerto Rico v. Centro de Periodismo Investigativo, Inc., No. 22-96, 598 U.S. ___ (2023)
- Tuaua v. United States – Court case concerning citizenship of American Samoans (2015)
- Fitisemanu v. United States – 2021 federal legal case regarding birthright citizenship in US territories

== See also ==
- Insular area
- Guano Islands Act
- Guantánamo Bay
- Philippine–American War
- Puerto Rico
- Unincorporated territories of the United States
