= DeLima v. Bidwell =

- Supreme Court of the United States

Argued January 8–11, 1901 Decided May 27, 1901
- Full case name: Elias S.A. DeLima, et al., plaintiffs in error, v. George R. Bidwell
- Citations: 182 U.S. 1 (more) 21 S. Ct. 743; 45 L. Ed. 1041

Holding
- Upon ratification of the Treaty of Paris, Puerto Rico was not a foreign country for purposes of the tariff laws of the United States, which required payment of duties on goods moving into the United States from a foreign country.

Court membership
- Chief Justice Melville Fuller Associate Justices John M. Harlan · Horace Gray; David J. Brewer · Henry B. Brown; George Shiras Jr. · Edward D. White; Rufus W. Peckham · Joseph McKenna

Case opinions
- Majority: Brown, joined by Fuller, Harlan, Peckham, Brewer
- Dissent: McKenna, joined by Shiras, White
- Dissent: Gray

DeLima v. Bidwell, 182 U.S. 1 (1901), was one of a group of the first Insular Cases decided by the US Supreme Court.

The case was argued on January 8–11, 1901 and was decided on May 27, 1901.

== Background ==
The DeLima Sugar Importing Company sued George R. Bidwell, Collector of the Port of New York, to recover duties on sugar imported from Puerto Rico after 1899, when Puerto Rico was ceded to the United States. DeLima argued that the Collector had no authority to collect those duties since Puerto Rico had been annexed by the United States.

The lower appellate court held the following:

1. Although the Collector had the right to challenge the factual sufficiency, he was barred from challenging federal jurisdiction on the basis of wrongful removal where the case was removed upon his own petition.
2. The Customs Administrative Act did not decide whether the sugar was imported from a foreign country and so the court case was a proper legal action.
3. Puerto Rico was not a foreign country for tariff purposes but was a United States territory because by the Treaty of Paris, the district was ceded to and in the possession of the United States. It was not necessary for an Act of Congress to embrace the territory for the purpose of tariff laws. Therefore, the duties on sugar were illegal, and DeLima Sugar Importing Company was entitled to a refund of its duties on sugar.

== Decision ==
The Supreme Court ruled 5–4 that Puerto Rico, since its cession to the United States by the Treaty of Paris (1898), was not a foreign country for the purposes of US tariff laws, which required payment of duties on goods moving into the United States from a foreign country. In the absence of congressional legislation, the US government could not collect customs duties on sugar from Puerto Rico shipped to other parts of the United States by classifying Puerto Rico as a foreign country.

The majority opinion was authored by Justice Henry Billings Brown and joined by Justices Melville Fuller, John Marshall Harlan, Rufus Wheeler Peckham and David Josiah Brewer.

Justice Joseph McKenna authored a dissenting opinion, which was joined by Justices George Shiras Jr., and Edward Douglass White. Justice Horace Gray authored a separate dissenting opinion.

The decision is similar to Downes v. Bidwell, 182 U.S. 244 (1901), which was decided on the same date.

== Contemporary reaction ==
In 2023, the ACLU condemned the case's description of inhabitants of Guam, Puerto Rico, and the Philippines as "savage tribes".

They claimed these rulings "still prevent millions of people — overwhelmingly, people of color — from accessing certain constitutional rights and protections. These rulings continue to uphold systemic racism today".

== See also ==
- Insular Cases
- List of United States Supreme Court cases, volume 182
