= United States v. Vaello Madero =

- Supreme Court of the United States

Argued November 9, 2021 Decided April 21, 2022
- Full case name: United States v. Jose Luis Vaello Madero
- Docket no.: 20-303
- Citations: 596 U.S. ___ (more)
- Argument: Oral argument
- Decision: Opinion

Holding
- The Constitution does not require Congress to extend Supplemental Security Income benefits to residents of Puerto Rico.

Court membership
- Chief Justice John Roberts Associate Justices Clarence Thomas · Stephen Breyer; Samuel Alito · Sonia Sotomayor; Elena Kagan · Neil Gorsuch; Brett Kavanaugh · Amy Coney Barrett

Case opinions
- Majority: Kavanaugh, joined by Roberts, Thomas, Breyer, Alito, Kagan, Gorsuch, Barrett
- Concurrence: Thomas
- Concurrence: Gorsuch
- Dissent: Sotomayor

Laws applied
- U.S. Const. art. IV; U.S. Const. amend. V

United States v. Vaello Madero, 596 U.S. 159 (2022), was a United States Supreme Court case related to the constitutionality of the exclusion of United States citizens residing in Puerto Rico from the Supplemental Security Income program. In an 8–1 decision, the Court ruled that as Congress had been granted broad oversight of United States territories by Article Four of the United States Constitution, the exclusion of the territories by Congress from programs like Supplemental Security Income did not violate the Due Process Clause of the Fifth Amendment.

== Background ==
The Supplemental Security Income (SSI) program is a benefit for older or disabled citizens who are unable to care for themselves. As established by act of Congress, the benefits are available to all citizens of the 50 states, the District of Columbia, and the Northern Mariana Islands, but do not cover residents of the other United States territories, including Puerto Rico.

Jose Luis Vaello Madero was a recipient of SSI benefits while living in New York, and then moved to Puerto Rico in 2013. He continued to receive SSI benefits, but eventually the government discovered his new residence, terminated the SSI benefits and sought to recover approximately $28,000 he had improperly received while in Puerto Rico. A federal district judge and the United States Court of Appeals for the First Circuit found that this exclusion violated the equal protection principle of the Fifth Amendment to the United States Constitution's due process clause, which was first established in Bolling v. Sharpe.

== Supreme Court ==
Certiorari was granted in the case on March 1, 2021. The argument in this case was held on November 9, 2021, and the decision was announced on April 21, 2022. Associate Justice Brett Kavanaugh delivered the opinion of the court. Associate Justices Clarence Thomas and Neil Gorsuch wrote concurrences. Associate Justice Sonia Sotomayor wrote a dissenting opinion.

=== Opinion of the Court ===
Justice Kavanaugh's opinion represented the views of eight justices; all sitting justices except Justice Sotomayor. The Court held that the "equal-protection component" of the Fifth Amendment's Due Process Clause did not require Congress to allow Puerto Rico residents to receive Supplemental Security Income benefits. The Court gave several reasons for this ruling. First, Congress has broad authority under the Territory Clause of Article IV, Section 3 to "make all needful Rules and Regulations respecting the Territory ... belonging to the United States". The Court noted that residents of Puerto Rico are not required by Congress to pay certain federal taxes, and in return do not get some federal benefits. Second, the Court noted that the statute authorizing the Supplemental Security Income program specifically defined the United States as "the 50 states and the District of Columbia". Third, the Court noted its prior decisions of Califano v. Torres (1978), which found Congress's exclusion of Puerto Rico from SSI did not violate the right to interstate travel, and Harris v. Rosario (1980), which found that Congress can "treat Puerto Rico differently from States so long as there is a rational basis for its actions" and that Puerto Rico's different tax burden was a rational basis to exclude Puerto Rico from a different benefit program. The Court found these precedents "dictate the result here". The Court concluded by saying that Congress could include Puerto Rico in the SSI program, but it was not required to do so.

=== Concurrences ===
Both Justice Thomas and Justice Gorsuch joined the opinion of the Court in full. Justice Thomas wrote separately to question whether the Fifth Amendment contains an "equal-protection component" and to suggest that the Fourteenth Amendment's Citizenship Clause may be the text of the Constitution that prohibits racial discrimination by the federal government. Justice Gorsuch wrote separately to call for the overruling of the Insular Cases, which stated that Puerto Rico and other unincorporated Territories could be ruled by the federal government "largely without regard to the Constitution".

==== Justice Thomas's concurrence ====
Justice Thomas noted that he previously has joined and written opinions applying the "doctrine" that the Fifth Amendment's Due Process Clause has an "equal protection component" that is similar to the Fourteenth Amendment's Equal Protection Clause. However, he "now doubt[s] whether it comports with the original meaning of the Constitution".

===== Section I =====
In Section I, Justice Thomas discusses how the Supreme Court has previously interpreted the Fifth Amendment's Due Process Clause and lists his criticisms of the logic behind Bolling v. Sharpe (1954). Thomas claims that Bolling "read an equal protection principle into the Fifth Amendment". He then criticizes the logic of Bolling as similar to Lochner v. New York (1905), and reiterates his long-standing opposition to substantive due process. He also critiques Bolling for interpreting "liberty" in the Fifth Amendment's Due Process Clause to include positive rights, rather than only negative rights; he notes that if it only includes negative rights, this would mean there is no right for Vaello-Madero to access Supplemental Security Income benefits. He also worries that the logic of Bolling would make Section 1 of the Fourteenth Amendment redundant. Finally, he doubts the assertion in Bolling that "it would be unthinkable that the same Constitution would impose a lesser duty on the Federal Government" to not engage in racial segregation. His two reasons for this are: several parts of the Constitution apply exclusively to the states or apply exclusively to the federal government and the enactors of the Fourteenth Amendment may have trusted the federal government to uphold racial minorities' rights more than the states.

===== Section II =====
In Section II, Justice Thomas discusses his alternative reasoning for Bolling v. Sharpe (1954), namely the Citizenship Clause in the Fourteenth Amendment. He argues that citizenship was historically associated with equality so that "the absence or presence of one entailed the absence or presence of the other". In Section II-A, Thomas discusses how even Chief Justice Roger B. Taney's infamous opinion in Dred Scott v. Sandford (1857) demonstrated the connection between citizenship and equal protection when Taney, "erroneously in [Thomas's] view", claimed that the "States' longstanding and widespread practice of denying free blacks equal civil rights conclusively showed that blacks were not citizens entitled to various constitutional protections". Thomas explains that even after the Civil War and the Thirteenth Amendment, southern states refused to acknowledge black people as citizens and refused to respect their rights. In response, Congress enacted the Civil Rights Act of 1866 and sent the Fourteenth Amendment to the states. Justice Thomas cited the debates surrounding these laws as evidence that the Citizenship Clause of the Fourteenth Amendment may include an equal protection component. In Section II-B, Justice Thomas briefly discusses various decisions from 1868 (after the ratification of the Fourteenth Amendment) to 1896 (the year Plessy v. Ferguson was decided) that support the view that the Citizenship Clause of the Fourteenth Amendment was understood by some justices on the Supreme Court (especially John Marshall Harlan) to prohibit the federal government from denying equal protection of the laws. Ultimately, Thomas concludes, "Rather than continue to invoke the Fifth Amendment's Due Process Clause to justify Bolling, in an appropriate case, we should more carefully consider whether this interpretation of the Citizenship Clause would yield a similar, and more supportable, result".

==== Justice Gorsuch's concurrence ====
Justice Gorsuch began by claiming that "it is past time to acknowledge the gravity of this error and admit what we know to be true: The Insular Cases have no foundation in the Constitution and rest instead on racial stereotypes. They deserve no place in our law". In Section I, he wrote about how the United States acquired Puerto Rico and Guam through the Spanish–American War. He noted that these new territories "ignited a fierce debate" about whether these new territories should be treated like colonies and the Constitution should have a limited application or whether they should be considered part of the American republic and covered fully by the Constitution. He then described how this debate impacted the justices' opinions in the Insular Cases. In Section II, Gorsuch explains why the Insular Cases must be overruled. According to Gorsuch, they "claim support in the academic work of the period, ugly racial stereotypes, and the theories of Social Darwinists. But they have no home in our Constitution or its original understanding". He compared how the Court treated cases concerning the Utah Territory with how it treated cases concerning Puerto Rico and found that the Insular Cases deviated from the previous cases. Then, he noted that the Court "devised a workaround" to avoid overruling the cases directly. However, he saw this as ineffective because lower courts are still required to follow the Insular Cases and require judges to claim some parts of the Constitution are more "fundamental" than other parts. He noted the absurdity of full Constitutional rights applying on the uninhabited Palmyra Atoll, but not for 3 million people on Puerto Rico. Gorsuch accepted that both parties, the United States and Vaello Madero, assumed that the equal protection component of the Fifth Amendment's Due Process Clause is "fundamental" and applies to Puerto Rico. So, this "may obviate the necessity of overruling the Insular Cases today." He concluded, "Because no party asks us to overrule the Insular Cases to resolve today's dispute, I join the Court's opinion".

=== Dissent ===
Justice Sotomayor dissented because Congress's reasoning for excluding Puerto Rico from the Supplemental Security Income program fails rational basis review, and therefore violates the equal protection component of the Fifth Amendment's Due Process Clause. In Section I, Sotomayor describes the changes from the previous state-by-state programs partially funded by the federal government to the SSI program which was uniform and fully funded and controlled by the federal government. Specifically, "Congress displaced the States" in this one particular program. She noted that the SSI statute defined residents of the United States to exclude Puerto Rico. However, she noted Congress's frequent choices to define the "United States" as including Puerto Rico. She also emphasized that residents of Puerto Rico are United States citizens. In Section II, Sotomayor describes the history of the case, including what caused the lawsuit and what lower courts had decided. In Section III, Sotomayor describes how even assuming rational basis review, a "deferential" but not "toothless" standard, the decision to exclude Puerto Rico residents from SSI is impermissible. She also notes her agreement with Justice Gorsuch that the Court should consider overruling the Insular Cases in the future. In Section III-A, Sotomayor explains that "under the current system, the jurisdiction in which an SSI recipient resides has no bearing at all on the purposes or requirements of the SSI program", because the SSI program is a "direct relationship" between the individual and the federal government. Sotomayor claims this feature of the program means that location is not a rational basis for classification in this situation. She also notes that "by definition, SSI recipients pay few if any taxes at all", casting doubt on the majority's reliance on the tax burdens and benefits as a rational basis for classification. In Section III-B, Sotomayor questions whether this holding may apply to states; for instance, if "Congress could exclude needy residents of Vermont, Wyoming, South Dakota, North Dakota, Montana, and Alaska". She also states that the federal government had not brought to the Court's attention any other program that "operates in such a uniform, nationalized, and direct manner". Sotomayor concludes that while it is true that the Constitution gives Congress the authority to "make all needful Rules and Regulations" for territories, that does not allow Congress to ignore the "constitutional command that it treat United States citizens equally".

== See also ==
- Fitisemanu v. United States
