= List of United States Supreme Court cases, volume 230 =

Supreme Court of the United States
- Interactive map of Supreme Court of the United States
- 38°53′26″N 77°00′16″W
- Established: March 4, 1789; 236 years ago
- Location: Washington, D.C.
- Coordinates: 38°53′26″N 77°00′16″W
- Composition method: Presidential nomination with Senate confirmation
- Authorised by: Constitution of the United States, Art. III, § 1
- Judge term length: life tenure, subject to impeachment and removal
- Number of positions: 9 (by statute)
- Website: supremecourt.gov

This is a list of cases reported in volume 230 of United States Reports, decided by the Supreme Court of the United States in 1913.

== Justices of the Supreme Court at the time of volume 230 U.S. ==
The Supreme Court is established by Article III, Section 1 of the Constitution of the United States, which says: "The judicial Power of the United States, shall be vested in one supreme Court . . .". The size of the Court is not specified; the Constitution leaves it to Congress to set the number of justices. Under the Judiciary Act of 1789 Congress originally fixed the number of justices at six (one chief justice and five associate justices). Since 1789 Congress has varied the size of the Court from six to seven, nine, ten, and back to nine justices (always including one chief justice).

When the cases in volume 230 were decided the Court comprised the following nine members:

Portrait	Justice	Office	Home State	Succeeded	Date confirmed by the Senate (Vote)	Tenure on Supreme Court
	Edward Douglass White	Chief Justice	Louisiana	Melville Fuller	December 12, 1910 (Acclamation)	December 19, 1910 – May 19, 1921 (Died)
	Joseph McKenna	Associate Justice	California	Stephen Johnson Field	January 21, 1898 (Acclamation)	January 26, 1898 – January 5, 1925 (Retired)
	Oliver Wendell Holmes Jr.	Associate Justice	Massachusetts	Horace Gray	December 4, 1902 (Acclamation)	December 8, 1902 – January 12, 1932 (Retired)
	William R. Day	Associate Justice	Ohio	George Shiras Jr.	February 23, 1903 (Acclamation)	March 2, 1903 – November 13, 1922 (Retired)
	Horace Harmon Lurton	Associate Justice	Tennessee	Rufus W. Peckham	December 20, 1909 (Acclamation)	January 3, 1910 – July 12, 1914 (Died)
	Charles Evans Hughes	Associate Justice	New York	David Josiah Brewer	May 2, 1910 (Acclamation)	October 10, 1910 – June 10, 1916 (Resigned)
	Willis Van Devanter	Associate Justice	Wyoming	Edward Douglass White (as Associate Justice)	December 15, 1910 (Acclamation)	January 3, 1911 – June 2, 1937 (Retired)
	Joseph Rucker Lamar	Associate Justice	Georgia	William Henry Moody	December 15, 1910 (Acclamation)	January 3, 1911 – January 2, 1916 (Died)
	Mahlon Pitney	Associate Justice	New Jersey	John Marshall Harlan	March 13, 1912 (50–26)	March 18, 1912 – December 31, 1922 (Resigned)

== Citation style ==
Under the Judiciary Act of 1789 the federal court structure at the time comprised District Courts, which had general trial jurisdiction; Circuit Courts, which had mixed trial and appellate (from the US District Courts) jurisdiction; and the United States Supreme Court, which had appellate jurisdiction over the federal District and Circuit courts—and for certain issues over state courts. The Supreme Court also had limited original jurisdiction (i.e., in which cases could be filed directly with the Supreme Court without first having been heard by a lower federal or state court). There were one or more federal District Courts and/or Circuit Courts in each state, territory, or other geographical region.

The Judiciary Act of 1891 created the United States Courts of Appeals and reassigned the jurisdiction of most routine appeals from the district and circuit courts to these appellate courts. The Act created nine new courts that were originally known as the "United States Circuit Courts of Appeals." The new courts had jurisdiction over most appeals of lower court decisions. The Supreme Court could review either legal issues that a court of appeals certified or decisions of court of appeals by writ of certiorari.

On January 1, 1912, the effective date of the Judicial Code of 1911, the old Circuit Courts were abolished, with their remaining trial court jurisdiction transferred to the U.S. District Courts.

Bluebook citation style is used for case names, citations, and jurisdictions.

- "# Cir." = United States Court of Appeals
  - e.g., "3d Cir." = United States Court of Appeals for the Third Circuit
- "C.C.D." = United States Circuit Court for the District of . . .
  - e.g.,"C.C.D.N.J." = United States Circuit Court for the District of New Jersey
- "D." = United States District Court for the District of . . .
  - e.g.,"D. Mass." = United States District Court for the District of Massachusetts
- "E." = Eastern; "M." = Middle; "N." = Northern; "S." = Southern; "W." = Western
  - e.g.,"C.C.S.D.N.Y." = United States Circuit Court for the Southern District of New York
  - e.g.,"M.D. Ala." = United States District Court for the Middle District of Alabama
- "Ct. Cl." = United States Court of Claims
- The abbreviation of a state's name alone indicates the highest appellate court in that state's judiciary at the time.
  - e.g.,"Pa." = Supreme Court of Pennsylvania
  - e.g.,"Me." = Supreme Judicial Court of Maine

== List of cases in volume 230 U.S. ==
Case Name	Page & year	Opinion of the Court	Concurring opinion(s)	Dissenting opinion(s)	Lower Court	Disposition
Jackson v. United States	1 (1913)	White	none	none	Ct. Cl.	affirmed
Hughes v. United States	24 (1913)	White	none	none	Ct. Cl.	multiple
Ex parte American Steamboat Company	35 (1913)	Lurton	none	none	multiple	mandamus denied
Arizona Copper Company v. Gillespie	46 (1913)	Lurton	none	none	Ariz.	affirmed
City of Owensboro v. Cumberland Telephone and Telegraph Company	58 (1913)	Lurton	none	Day	C.C.W.D. Ky.	affirmed
Boise Artesian Hot and Cold Water Company v. City of Boise I	84 (1913)	Lurton	none	none	D. Idaho	reversed
Boise Artesian Hot and Cold Water Company v. City of Boise II	98 (1913)	Lurton	none	none	9th Cir.	dismissed
Old Colony Trust Company v. City of Omaha	100 (1913)	VanDevanter	none	none	D. Neb.	reversed
Omaha Electric Light and Power Company v. City of Omaha	123 (1913)	VanDevanter	none	none	8th Cir.	dismissed
Butts v. Merchants and Miners Transportation Company	126 (1913)	VanDevanter	none	none	D. Mass.	affirmed
Ochoa v. Hernandez y Morales	139 (1913)	Pitney	none	none	D.P.R.	affirmed
Nalle v. Oyster	165 (1913)	Pitney	none	none	D.C. Cir.	reversed
Pennsylvania Railroad Company v. International Coal Mining Company	184 (1913)	Lamar	none	Pitney	3d Cir.	reversed
Mitchell C. and C. Company v. Pennsylvania Railroad Company	247 (1913)	Lamar	none	Pitney	E.D. Pa.	multiple
Morrisdale Coal Company v. Pennsylvania Railroad Company	304 (1913)	Lamar	none	none	3d Cir.	affirmed
Fourche River Lumber Company v. Bryant Lumber Company	316 (1913)	Lamar	none	none	Ark.	reversed
Omaha and Council Bluffs Railway and Bridge Company v. Interstate Commerce Commission	324 (1913)	Lamar	none	none	Comm. Ct.	reversed
Missouri Pacific Railroad Company v. Tucker	340 (1913)	VanDevanter	none	none	Kan.	reversed
Minnesota Rate Cases	352 (1913)	Hughes	none	none	C.C.D. Minn.	multiple
Missouri Rate Cases	474 (1913)	Hughes	none	none	C.C.W.D. Mo.	multiple
Knott v. St. Louis Southwestern Railway Company	509 (1913)	Hughes	none	none	C.C.W.D. Mo.	dismissed
Knott v. St. Louis, Kansas City and Colorado Railroad Company	512 (1913)	Hughes	none	none	C.C.W.D. Mo.	reversed
Chesapeake and Ohio Railway Company v. Conley	513 (1913)	Hughes	none	none	W. Va.	affirmed
Oregon Railroad and Navigation Company v. Campbell	525 (1913)	Hughes	none	none	C.C.D. Or.	affirmed
Southern Pacific Company v. Campbell	537 (1913)	Hughes	none	none	C.C.D. Or.	affirmed
Allen v. St. Louis, Iron Mountain and Southern Railway Company	553 (1913)	Hughes	none	none	C.C.E.D. Ark.	reversed
