= List of United States Supreme Court cases, volume 182 =

Supreme Court of the United States
- Interactive map of Supreme Court of the United States
- 38°53′26″N 77°00′16″W
- Established: March 4, 1789; 236 years ago
- Location: Washington, D.C.
- Coordinates: 38°53′26″N 77°00′16″W
- Composition method: Presidential nomination with Senate confirmation
- Authorised by: Constitution of the United States, Art. III, § 1
- Judge term length: life tenure, subject to impeachment and removal
- Number of positions: 9 (by statute)
- Website: supremecourt.gov

This is a list of cases reported in volume 182 of United States Reports, decided by the Supreme Court of the United States in 1901.

== Justices of the Supreme Court at the time of volume 182 U.S. ==
The Supreme Court is established by Article III, Section 1 of the Constitution of the United States, which says: "The judicial Power of the United States, shall be vested in one supreme Court . . .". The size of the Court is not specified; the Constitution leaves it to Congress to set the number of justices. Under the Judiciary Act of 1789 Congress originally fixed the number of justices at six (one chief justice and five associate justices). Since 1789 Congress has varied the size of the Court from six to seven, nine, ten, and back to nine justices (always including one chief justice).

When the cases in volume 182 were decided the Court comprised the following nine members:

Portrait	Justice	Office	Home State	Succeeded	Date confirmed by the Senate (Vote)	Tenure on Supreme Court
	Melville Fuller	Chief Justice	Illinois	Morrison Waite	July 20, 1888 (41–20)	October 8, 1888 – July 4, 1910 (Died)
	John Marshall Harlan	Associate Justice	Kentucky	David Davis	November 29, 1877 (Acclamation)	December 10, 1877 – October 14, 1911 (Died)
	Horace Gray	Associate Justice	Massachusetts	Nathan Clifford	December 20, 1881 (51–5)	January 9, 1882 – September 15, 1902 (Died)
	David Josiah Brewer	Associate Justice	Kansas	Stanley Matthews	December 18, 1889 (53–11)	January 6, 1890 – March 28, 1910 (Died)
	Henry Billings Brown	Associate Justice	Michigan	Samuel Freeman Miller	December 29, 1890 (Acclamation)	January 5, 1891 – May 28, 1906 (Retired)
	George Shiras Jr.	Associate Justice	Pennsylvania	Joseph P. Bradley	July 26, 1892 (Acclamation)	October 10, 1892 – February 23, 1903 (Retired)
	Edward Douglass White	Associate Justice	Louisiana	Samuel Blatchford	February 19, 1894 (Acclamation)	March 12, 1894 – December 18, 1910 (Continued as chief justice)
	Rufus W. Peckham	Associate Justice	New York	Howell Edmunds Jackson	December 9, 1895 (Acclamation)	January 6, 1896 – October 24, 1909 (Died)
	Joseph McKenna	Associate Justice	California	Stephen Johnson Field	January 21, 1898 (Acclamation)	January 26, 1898 – January 5, 1925 (Retired)

== Notable Cases in 182 U.S. ==
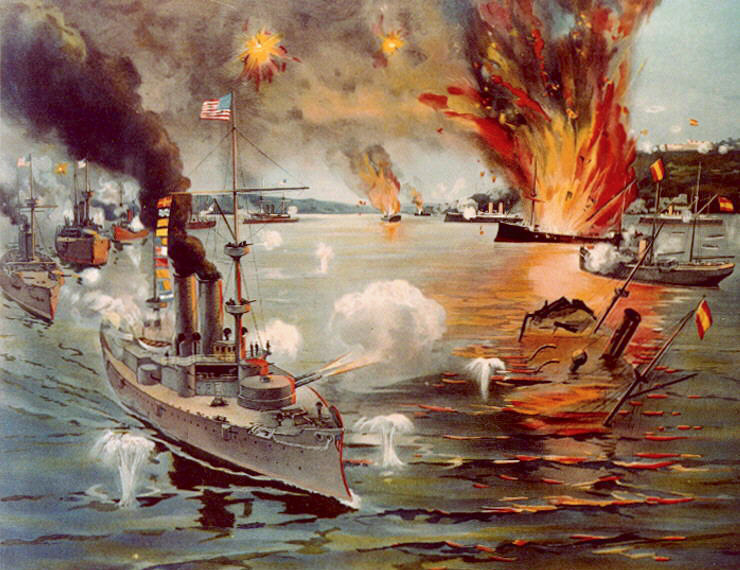
Battle of Manila Bay in 1898

=== Insular Cases ===
The Insular Cases are a series of opinions by the Supreme Court in 1901 (the first six opinions in 182 U.S., at pages 1–397, all authored by Justice Henry Billings Brown, along with various concurring and dissenting opinions by other Justices), about the status of U.S. territories acquired in the Spanish–American War, such as the Philippines. The Supreme Court held in the Insular Cases that full constitutional protection of rights does not automatically extend to all places under American control. This meant that inhabitants of unincorporated territories such as Puerto Rico—"even if they are U.S. citizens"—may lack some constitutional rights (e.g., the right to remain part of the United States in case of de-annexation) because they were not part of the United States.

== Citation style ==
Under the Judiciary Act of 1789 the federal court structure at the time comprised District Courts, which had general trial jurisdiction; Circuit Courts, which had mixed trial and appellate (from the US District Courts) jurisdiction; and the United States Supreme Court, which had appellate jurisdiction over the federal District and Circuit courts—and for certain issues over state courts. The Supreme Court also had limited original jurisdiction (i.e., in which cases could be filed directly with the Supreme Court without first having been heard by a lower federal or state court). There were one or more federal District Courts and/or Circuit Courts in each state, territory, or other geographical region.

The Judiciary Act of 1891 created the United States Courts of Appeals and reassigned the jurisdiction of most routine appeals from the district and circuit courts to these appellate courts. The Act created nine new courts that were originally known as the "United States Circuit Courts of Appeals." The new courts had jurisdiction over most appeals of lower court decisions. The Supreme Court could review either legal issues that a court of appeals certified or decisions of court of appeals by writ of certiorari.

Bluebook citation style is used for case names, citations, and jurisdictions.

- "# Cir." = United States Court of Appeals
  - e.g., "3d Cir." = United States Court of Appeals for the Third Circuit
- "C.C.D." = United States Circuit Court for the District of . . .
  - e.g.,"C.C.D.N.J." = United States Circuit Court for the District of New Jersey
- "D." = United States District Court for the District of . . .
  - e.g.,"D. Mass." = United States District Court for the District of Massachusetts
- "E." = Eastern; "M." = Middle; "N." = Northern; "S." = Southern; "W." = Western
  - e.g.,"C.C.S.D.N.Y." = United States Circuit Court for the Southern District of New York
  - e.g.,"M.D. Ala." = United States District Court for the Middle District of Alabama
- "Ct. Cl." = United States Court of Claims
- The abbreviation of a state's name alone indicates the highest appellate court in that state's judiciary at the time.
  - e.g.,"Pa." = Supreme Court of Pennsylvania
  - e.g.,"Me." = Supreme Judicial Court of Maine

== List of cases in volume 182 U.S. ==
Case Name	Page and year	Opinion of the Court	Concurring opinion(s)	Dissenting opinion(s)	Lower Court	Disposition
DeLima v. Bidwell (an Insular Case)	1 (1901)	Brown	none	McKenna; Gray	C.C.S.D.N.Y.	reversed
Goetze v. United States (an Insular Case)	221 (1901)	Brown	none	none	C.C.S.D.N.Y.	reversed
Dooley v. United States (an Insular Case)	222 (1901)	Brown	none	White	C.C.S.D.N.Y.	reversed
Armstrong v. United States (an Insular Case)	243 (1901)	Brown	none	none	Ct. Cl.	reversed
Downes v. Bidwell (an Insular Case)	244 (1901)	Brown	White; Gray	Fuller; Harlan	C.C.S.D.N.Y.	affirmed
Huus v. New York and Port Rico Steamship Company (an Insular Case)	392 (1901)	Brown	none	none	2d Cir.	certification
Carson v. Brockton Sewage Commission	398 (1901)	Brown	none	none	Mass.	affirmed
Homer Ramsdell Transportation Company v. Compagnie Generale Transatlantique	406 (1901)	Gray	none	none	2d Cir.	certification
Lake Street Elevated Railroad Company v. Farmers' Loan and Trust Company	417 (1901)	Shiras	none	none	Ill.	dismissed
Reagan v. United States	419 (1901)	Fuller	none	none	Ct. Cl.	affirmed
Simon v. Craft	427 (1901)	White	none	none	Ala.	affirmed
Pirie v. Chicago Title and Trust Company	438 (1901)	McKenna	none	Fuller	7th Cir.	affirmed
United States ex rel. Queen v. Alvey	456 (1901)	McKenna	none	none	D.C. Cir.	rule discharged
Clews v. Jamieson	461 (1901)	Peckham	none	Harlan	7th Cir.	reversed
Calhoun Gold Mining Company v. Ajax Gold Mining Company	499 (1901)	McKenna	none	none	Colo.	affirmed
District of Columbia v. Talty	510 (1901)	McKenna	none	none	Ct. Cl.	affirmed
Russell v. United States	516 (1901)	McKenna	none	none	Ct. Cl.	affirmed
Lantry v. Wallace	536 (1901)	Harlan	none	none	8th Cir.	affirmed
Hood v. Wallace	555 (1901)	Harlan	none	none	8th Cir.	affirmed
Commerce National Bank v. Chambers	556 (1901)	White	none	none	Utah	affirmed
Fuller v. United States	562 (1901)	Harlan	none	none	Ct. App. Indian Terr.	rule discharged
District of Columbia v. Moulton	576 (1901)	White	none	none	D.C. Cir.	reversed
Jacobs v. Marks	583 (1901)	Shiras	none	none	Ill.	affirmed
Glavey v. United States	595 (1901)	Harlan	none	none	Ct. Cl.	reversed

== See also ==
- Certificate of division
