= Downes v. Bidwell =

- Supreme Court of the United States

Argued January 8–11, 1901 Decided May 27, 1901
- Full case name: Samuel Downes v. George R. Bidwell
- Citations: 182 U.S. 244 (more) 21 S. Ct. 770; 45 L. Ed. 1088

Holding
- The Constitution does not necessarily apply to territories. Instead, Congress has jurisdiction to create law within territories in certain circumstances, particularly those dealing with revenue, which would not be allowed by the Constitution for states within the union.

Court membership
- Chief Justice Melville Fuller Associate Justices John M. Harlan · Horace Gray; David J. Brewer · Henry B. Brown; George Shiras Jr. · Edward D. White; Rufus W. Peckham · Joseph McKenna

Case opinions
- Plurality: Brown
- Concurrence: White, joined by Shiras, McKenna
- Concurrence: Gray
- Dissent: Fuller, joined by Harlan, Brewer, Peckham
- Dissent: Harlan

Laws applied
- U.S. Const. art. 1, § 8; art. IV, § 3, cl. 2 Foraker Act

Downes v. Bidwell, 182 U.S. 244 (1901), was a case in which the US Supreme Court decided whether US territories were subject to the provisions and protections of the US Constitution. The issue is sometimes stated as whether the Constitution follows the flag. The decision narrowly held that the Constitution does not necessarily apply to territories. Instead, the US Congress has jurisdiction to create law within territories in certain circumstances, particularly those dealing with revenue, which would not be allowed by the Constitution for US states. It has become known as one of the "Insular Cases".

== Background ==
The case specifically concerned a merchant, Samuel Downes, who owned S. B. Downes & Company. His company had imported oranges into the Port of New York from the newly-acquired territory of Puerto Rico and had been forced to pay import duties on them. He sued George R. Bidwell, the US customs inspector for the port of New York.

The Supreme Court in DeLima v. Bidwell had decided that ever since Puerto Rico had been acquired by the United States from Spain in the Treaty of Paris (1898), normal customs levied on imports from foreign countries did not apply to imports from Puerto Rico since it had ceased to be a foreign country.

However, the Foraker Act now levied customs specifically on imports from Puerto Rico. Downes disputed its constitutionality on the grounds that such duties were under the jurisdiction of Article I, Section 8, of the US Constitution, which provides that "all duties, imposts, and excises shall be uniform throughout the United States." Since the duty on oranges did not exist for other parts of the United States, he argued that it should not exist for Puerto Rico.

== Decision ==
The Supreme Court decided 5–4 that the newly-annexed territories were not properly part of the United States for purposes of the Constitution in the matter of revenues, administrative matters, and the like. However, the court was careful to note that the constitutional guarantees of a citizen's rights of liberty and property were applicable to all and "cannot be under any circumstances transcended", according to Justice Edward Douglass White's concurring opinion.

Territories were due the full protections of the Constitution only when Congress had incorporated them as an "integral part" of the United States. The court's doctrinal statement distinguished the District of Columbia (which exists under provisions providing for its existence in the constitution, not the Property Clause) from the territories by observing that it had been derived from land that was within state boundaries. The court said that, once Congress extended the Constitution's full reach to that land, Congress lacked the power to withdraw it by any means.

One of two dissenting opinions was written by Justice John Marshall Harlan, who would have held that Congress was always bound to enact laws within the jurisdiction of the Constitution: "This nation is under the control of a written constitution, the supreme law of the land and the only source of the powers which our government, or any branch or officer of it, may exert at any time or at any place." He held that the Congress had no existence and thus had no authority outside the Constitution. He continued:

The idea prevails with some, indeed it has expression in arguments at the bar, that we have in this country substantially two national governments; one to be maintained under the Constitution, with all its restrictions; the other to be maintained by Congress outside and independently of that instrument, by exercising such powers as other nations of the earth are accustomed to. ... I take leave to say that, if the principles thus announced should ever receive the sanction of a majority of this court, a radical and mischievous change in our system will result. We will, in that event, pass from the era of constitutional liberty guarded and protected by a written constitution into an era of legislative absolutism. ... It will be an evil day for American Liberty if the theory of a government outside the Supreme Law of the Land finds lodgment in our Constitutional Jurisprudence. No higher duty rests upon this court than to exert its full authority to prevent all violation of the principles of the Constitution.

== Aftermath ==
The idea of territorial incorporation is generally agreed to have arisen from Justice White's concurring decision noted above. "Incorporation", in this sense, does not refer to the legal process whereby a company takes on certain of the characteristics of a person (see incorporation). The concept of "territorial incorporation" is that the United States can be proprietor of a territory without having actually incorporated that territory into the United States.

Unincorporated territories are not due the full benefits of the US Constitution, as noted from Justice White's decision above.

The idea has been used in court cases ever since to affirm that the citizens of certain territories can be subject to laws and regulations that are not constitutionally applicable to other citizens of the United States. Many citizens of territories that have been designated unincorporated have seen the principle of territorial incorporation as a form of oppression.
