= Mugler v. Kansas =

- Supreme Court of the United States

Argued April 11, 1887 Reargued October 11, 1887 Decided December 5, 1887
- Full case name: Peter Mugler v. Kansas; Kansas v. Ziebold & Hagelin
- Citations: 123 U.S. 623 (more) 8 S. Ct. 273; 31 L. Ed. 205; 1887 U.S. LEXIS 2204

Case history
- Prior: Defendant, Mugler, convicted for manufacture and sale of intoxicating liquors without a permit. Kansas Supreme Court affirmed conviction.

Holding
- The regulation and prohibition of alcohol are constitutional exercises of state police power. Conviction affirmed.

Court membership
- Chief Justice Morrison Waite Associate Justices Samuel F. Miller · Stephen J. Field; Joseph P. Bradley · John M. Harlan; Stanley Matthews · Horace Gray; Samuel Blatchford

Case opinions
- Majority: Harlan, joined by Waite, Miller, Bradley, Matthews, Gray, and Blatchford
- Concur/dissent: Field

Laws applied
- U.S. Const. amend. XIV

Mugler v. Kansas, 123 U.S. 623 (1887), was an important United States Supreme Court case in which the 7–1 opinion was written by John Marshall Harlan with a lone partial dissent by Stephen Johnson Field. The decision laid the foundation for the Supreme Court's later acceptance and defense during the Lochner era of Justice Field's theory of economic substantive due process under the Due Process Clause of the Fourteenth Amendment.

== Background ==
As part of the burgeoning temperance movement, the people of Kansas amended their state constitution on November 2, 1880: "The manufacture and sale of intoxicating liquors shall be forever prohibited in this state, except for medical, scientific and mechanical purposes." The Kansas Legislature subsequently enacted an accompanying statute on February 19, 1881, that provided that after May 1, 1881, any person who manufactured or aided in the manufacture of any liquor without an appropriate permit would be guilty of a misdemeanor. First-time violators were to be fined not less than $100 nor more than $500 or to be imprisoned in the county jail for not less than 20 nor more than 90 days.

On March 7, 1885, the legislature supplemented the statute by providing that all places in which intoxicating liquors were manufactured, sold, bartered, or given away or kept for sale, barter, or use were a nuisance and subject to abatement where a court judged them so. Courts adjudicating nuisance complaints were to sit in equity; also, the statute required the state meet the burden of proving that the defendant did not possess a permit, in which case the judge must declare the place complained of a nuisance. Offending owners of nuisances were to be fined not less than $100 nor more than $500 or to be imprisoned in the county jail for not less than 30 nor more than 90 days.

In 1877, prior to the passage of the Kansas constitutional amendment and its accompanying statute, Peter Mugler had built a brewery in Salina, Kansas. He spent $10,000 on the brewery's construction and had obtained a corporate charter from the state allowing him to operate a brewery. It was completed in 1877 and used for the manufacture of intoxicating malt liquor, commonly known as beer, up until May 1, 1881. Following the enactment of the statute, Mugler did not obtain a permit for the manufacture or sale of alcohol. Further, the brewery-specific design of Mugler's facility allegedly made it difficult to employ in other trades, subsequently dropping the value of the building to only $2500.

=== Procedural history ===
In November 1881, authorities indicted Peter Mugler in the District Court of Saline County, Kansas, for violation of the statutes. The first indictment contained five counts alleging that Mugler had sold, bartered, or given away intoxicating liquors without a permit and a sixth count alleging that his brewery was a public nuisance for being a place used in violation of the statute. The second indictment contained one count alleging Mugler had manufactured intoxicating liquors without a permit.

The District Court found Mugler guilty and fined him $100 and court fees. It subsequently rejected the defendant's motions for a new trial and for an arrest of judgment. The Kansas Supreme Court affirmed on appeal.

In August 1886, authorities filed an information in the District Court of Atchison County, Kansas against Ziebold and Hagelin for operating a brewery. The State of Kansas asked for an injunction to prevent Ziebold and Hagelin from selling, bartering or distributing intoxicating drinks, and also that the brewery be shut down as a common nuisance. On defendant's motion, the case was removed to the United States Circuit Court to be heard in equity jurisdiction. The Circuit Court dismissed the bill of information. (Note: "In all case of public nuisances, properly so called, an indictment lies to abate them, and to punish the offenders. But an information lies in equity to redress the grievance by way of injunction." (Quoting Joseph Story at 672-3)) The State of Kansas appealed The Supreme Court agreed to hear the cases.

== Supreme Court ==
=== Question ===
Does a state law prohibiting the manufacture and sale of intoxicating liquors, subsequently rendering property used for the purposes described of little economic value, deprive the owner of that property in conflict with the Due Process Clause of the Fourteenth Amendment?

=== Arguments ===
Mugler's attorney posited two arguments:

1. A substantive due process argument that, under the Fourteenth Amendment, Kansas lacked any authority to prohibit the manufacture of intoxicating liquors for personal use or for the purpose of export.
2. A takings argument citing the devaluation of Mugler's property from $10,000 to $2500 by the statute, the building's brewery-specific design, and the difficulty of employing the building in other lawful trades. Mugler's attorney backed this argument with the holding of Pumpelly v. Green Bay Co., which found the damming of a nearby river in order to improve navigation and had flooded the plaintiff's land, rendering it useless and without value, was a taking requiring compensation.

The attorney for Ziebold and Hagelin echoed Mugler's two arguments but posited an additional argument attacking the nuisance statute, which allowed for the destruction of all property used in keeping and maintaining the nuisance without a trial by jury, as a denial of due process. The state, according to Ziebold and Hagelin's attorney, was using the nuisance provision out of order; instead of trying and convicting the defendants first, and then subsequently declaring the property a nuisance on the fact of their conviction and enabling authorities to destroy the liquors, the state was instead using the nuisance statutes to convict the defendants without trial. The statute removed the presumption of innocence once the state had proved the owners of the alleged nuisance did not have a permit.

=== Decision ===
On December 5, 1887, the US Supreme Court upheld 7–1 the ruling of the Supreme Court of Kansas, thus affirming Mugler's convictions. Associate Justice John Marshall Harlan, writing for the majority, held that a state's legislation prohibiting the manufacture of intoxicating liquor within its jurisdiction does not infringe on any right or privilege secured by the Constitution of the United States. Addressing Mugler's first argument, the Court stated its belief that the principle requiring property holders not to use their property so as to be injurious to the community was compatible with the Fourteenth Amendment.

However, the Court decided that it possessed the power to inquire into the intentions of the legislature behind police power regulations to settle disputes over the relatedness of the regulation to a state's use of the police power:

The courts are not bound by mere forms, nor are they to be misled by mere pretenses. They are at liberty—indeed, are under a solemn duty—to look at the substance of things, whenever they enter upon the inquiry whether the legislature has transcended the limits of its authority. If, therefore, a statute purporting to have been enacted to protect the public health, the public morals, or the public safety has no real or substantial relation to those objects, or is a palpable invasion of the rights secured by the fundamental law, it is the duty of the courts to so adjudge, and thereby give effect to the Constitution.

Turning to Mugler's second argument, the Court found the authority for the statute in this case strictly relied upon Kansas's police power. Since the statute dealt with the health, the safety, and the morals of the population, the Court rejected Mugler's reliance on Pumpelly, distinguishing the Pumpelly case as a use solely of the state's power of eminent domain; the Court reasoned that a prohibition on the use of property, by valid legislation, for purposes of protecting the health and safety of the community cannot be deemed a taking or an appropriation of property for public benefit. Since the legislation did not restrict the owners control, right to dispose, or ability to use for lawful purposes, no taking had occurred: "No one may rightfully do that which the law-making power, upon reasonable grounds, declares to be prejudicial to the welfare."

Further, the Court held that states cannot be burdened with the condition that they must compensate individual owners for incidental losses suffered as a result of a prohibition on the use of property. Additionally, property values which depreciate as a result of the state's exercise of the police power is different from taking property for public use. In one case a nuisance is abated; in the other, property is taken away from the owner completely. If public safety requires certain action be taken by the legislature, lawmakers cannot be persuaded from discontinuing such activity because individuals will suffer incidental inconveniences.

== See also ==
- The Slaughterhouse Cases, 83 U.S. 36 (1873)
- Munn v. Illinois, 94 U.S. 113 (1876)
- Allgeyer v. Louisiana, 165 U.S. 578 (1897)
- Lochner v. New York, 198 U.S. 45 (1905)
