= Lochner v. New York =

1905 U.S. Supreme Court case on the freedom of contract

- Supreme Court of the United States

Argued February 24, 1905 Decided April 17, 1905
- Full case name: Joseph Lochner, Plaintiff in Error v. People of the State of New York
- Citations: 198 U.S. 45 (more) 25 S. Ct. 539; 49 L. Ed. 937; 1905 U.S. LEXIS 1153

Case history
- Prior: Defendant convicted, Oneida County Court, New York, February 12, 1902; affirmed, 76 N.Y.S. 396 (N.Y. App. Div. 1902); affirmed, 69 N.E. 373 (N.Y. 1904)

Holding
- New York State's regulation of the working hours of bakers was not a justifiable restriction on the right of freedom of contract under the Fourteenth Amendment's guarantee of liberty.

Court membership
- Chief Justice Melville Fuller Associate Justices John M. Harlan · David J. Brewer; Henry B. Brown · Edward D. White; Rufus W. Peckham · Joseph McKenna; Oliver W. Holmes Jr. · William R. Day

Case opinions
- Majority: Peckham, joined by Fuller, Brewer, Brown, McKenna
- Dissent: Harlan, joined by White, Day
- Dissent: Holmes

Laws applied
- U.S. Const. amend. XIV; 1897 N.Y. Laws art. 8, ch. 415, § 110
- Abrogated by
- West Coast Hotel Co. v. Parrish (1937)

Lochner v. New York, 198 U.S. 45 (1905), was a landmark decision of the U.S. Supreme Court holding that a New York State statute that prescribed maximum working hours for bakers violated the bakers' right to freedom of contract under the Fourteenth Amendment to the U.S. Constitution. The decision has since been effectively overturned.

The case began in 1899 when Joseph Lochner, a German immigrant who owned a bakery in Utica, New York, was charged with violating New York's Bakeshop Act of 1895. The Bakeshop Act had made it a crime for New York bakeries to employ bakers for more than 10 hours per day or 60 hours per week. He was convicted and ultimately appealed to the U.S. Supreme Court. A five-justice majority of the Supreme Court held that the law violated the Due Process Clause, stating that the law constituted an "unreasonable, unnecessary and arbitrary interference with the right and liberty of the individual to contract". Four dissenting justices rejected that view, and the dissent of Oliver Wendell Holmes Jr., in particular, became one of the most famous opinions in U.S. history.

Lochner is one of the most controversial decisions in the Supreme Court's history and gave the name to what is known as the Lochner era. During that time, the Supreme Court issued several decisions invalidating federal and state statutes that sought to regulate working conditions during the Progressive Era and the Great Depression. The period ended with West Coast Hotel Co. v. Parrish (1937), in which the Supreme Court upheld the constitutionality of minimum wage legislation enacted by Washington State.

== Background ==
In 1895, the New York State Legislature passed a law called the "Bakeshop Act" that made it a crime for any bakery in New York to employ a worker for more than 10 hours per day or more than 60 hours per week. Four years later, in 1899, New York authorities indicted Joseph Lochner, a German immigrant who owned a bakery in Utica, New York, on a charge of violating the Bakeshop Act by permitting an employee to work more than 60 hours in one week. Unlike other bakeries, which used two separate shifts for evening and morning work, Lochner's bakery employed only a single crew of bakers. His bakers would arrive in the evening and prepare the bread dough, then sleep for several hours in an on-site dormitory before waking up in the early morning and baking the loaves of bread. Lochner counted the time his bakers spent sleeping in the dormitory as working hours and paid them for it.

At Lochner's trial, his lawyer argued that the right to contract freely to be one of the rights encompassed by substantive due process. Lochner's case was argued by Henry Weismann, who had been one of the foremost advocates of the Bakeshop Act when he was Secretary of the Journeymen Bakers' Union. In his brief, Weismann decried the idea that "the treasured freedom of the individual... should be swept away under the guise of the police power of the State." He denied New York's argument that the Bakeshop Act was a necessary health measure by claiming that the "average bakery of the present day is well ventilated, comfortable both summer and winter, and always sweet smelling." Weismann's brief contained an appendix providing statistics showing that bakers' mortality rates were comparable to that of white-collar professionals.

Weismann's arguments were unsuccessful. The trial court found Lochner guilty and fined him $50 (equivalent to $1,935 in 2025). Lochner appealed to the New York Supreme Court, Appellate Division, which affirmed his conviction, then appealed to the New York Court of Appeals, which also affirmed it. He then appealed to the U.S. Supreme Court.

== Supreme Court decision ==
On April 17, 1905, the Supreme Court issued a 5–4 decision in favor of Lochner that struck down the New York Bakeshop Act's limits on bakers' working hours as unconstitutional.

=== Opinion of the Court ===
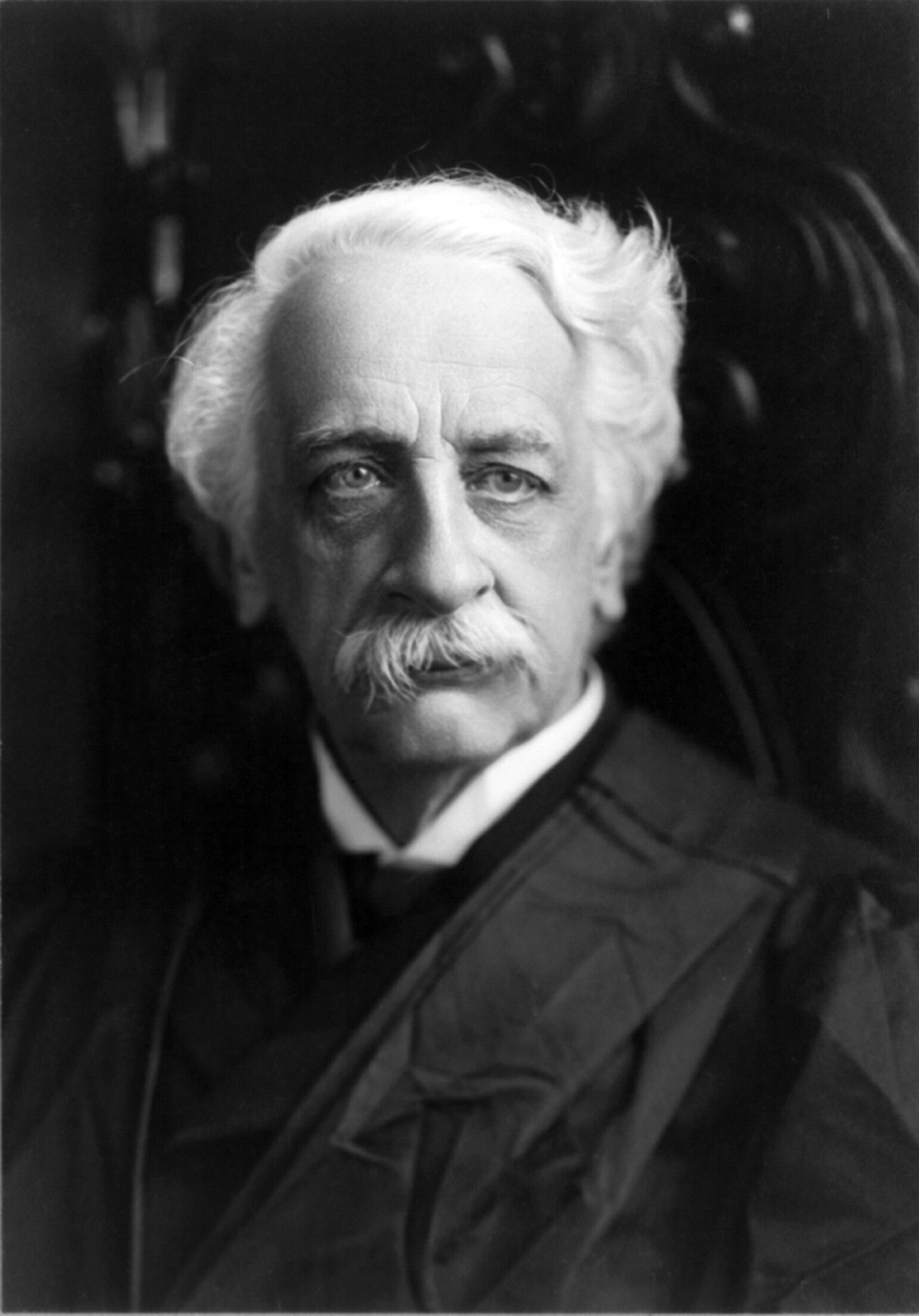
Justice Rufus Peckham, the author of the majority opinion in Lochner

Five justices formed the majority and joined an opinion written by Justice Rufus Peckham. The Court began with the question of whether the protections of the Fourteenth Amendment applied to freedom of contract. Citing its 1897 decision Allgeyer v. Louisiana, in which it had struck down a Louisiana law that banned buying shipping insurance from companies in other states on grounds that it violated the freedom to make contracts to carry out a trade or profession, the Court held that freedom of contract was a basic right covered by the protections for "life, liberty, and property" in the Fourteenth Amendment's Due Process Clause.

The general right to make a contract in relation to his business is part of the liberty of the individual protected by the Fourteenth Amendment to the Federal Constitution. Under that provision, no State can deprive any person of life, liberty or property without due process of law. The right to purchase or to sell labor is part of the liberty protected by this amendment unless there are circumstances which exclude the right.

— Lochner, 198 U.S. at 53 (citation omitted).

The Court explained that by "circumstances which exclude the right", it meant when a state passed a law under the "police power"—the inherent authority of U.S. state governments to pass laws governing "health, safety, and morals". The Court said that because the Due Process Clause protected freedom of contract, state laws could only interfere with it if they were valid exercises of the police power. To guarantee this freedom, the Court said American courts had to scrutinize state laws regulating economic freedom, such as New York's bakery law, to ensure they served valid police-power purposes.

Applying these legal principles to the facts of the case, the Court first determined that the job of a baker was not dangerous enough to need special government protection. The Court distinguished New York's law for bakers from a Utah law for miners the Court had upheld against a Due Process challenge in its 1898 decision Holden v. Hardy, saying that, unlike mining, baking was not an unusually dangerous activity. The Court also determined that the Bakeshop Act had no relation to public health. Reasoning that the New York Legislature could not rationally have enacted the law for health reasons, the Court concluded that the Act was really a "labor law" that could not be justified under the police power.

Clean and wholesome bread does not depend upon whether the baker works but ten hours per day or only sixty hours a week. ... The [Bakeshop] act is not, within any fair meaning of the term, a health law, but is an illegal interference with the rights of individuals, both employers and employees, to make contracts regarding labor upon such terms as they may think best, or which they may agree upon with the other parties to such contracts.

— Lochner, 198 U.S. at 57, 61.

The Court concluded that New York had failed to prove that the Bakeshop Act's maximum-hours provision had any close connection to public health. It said that if it were to conclude otherwise, then state governments would have unlimited power over citizens' lives.

It is also urged ... that it is to the interest of the State that its population should be strong and robust, and therefore any legislation which may be said to tend to make people healthy must be valid as health laws, enacted under the police power. ... Scarcely any law but might find shelter under such assumptions, and conduct, properly so called, as well as contract, would come under the restrictive sway of the legislature. Not only the hours of employees, but the hours of employers, could be regulated, and doctors, lawyers, scientists, all professional men, as well as athletes and artisans, could be forbidden to fatigue their brains and bodies by prolonged hours of exercise, lest the fighting strength of the State be impaired.

— Lochner, 198 U.S. at 60–61.

Lastly, the Court said that state laws ostensibly enacted for police-power purposes were often really intended to redistribute wealth or to help a certain group at the expense of others.

It is impossible for us to shut our eyes to the fact that many laws of this character, while passed under what is claimed to be the police power for the purpose of protecting the public health or welfare, are, in reality, passed for other motives.

— Lochner, 198 U.S. at 64.

Having determined that Bakeshop Act had no relation to public health and that the baking profession was not unusually dangerous, the Court concluded that "the limit of the police power has been reached and passed in this case", and it struck down the act as a violation of the Fourteenth Amendment's Due Process Clause.

=== Dissents ===
==== Harlan ====
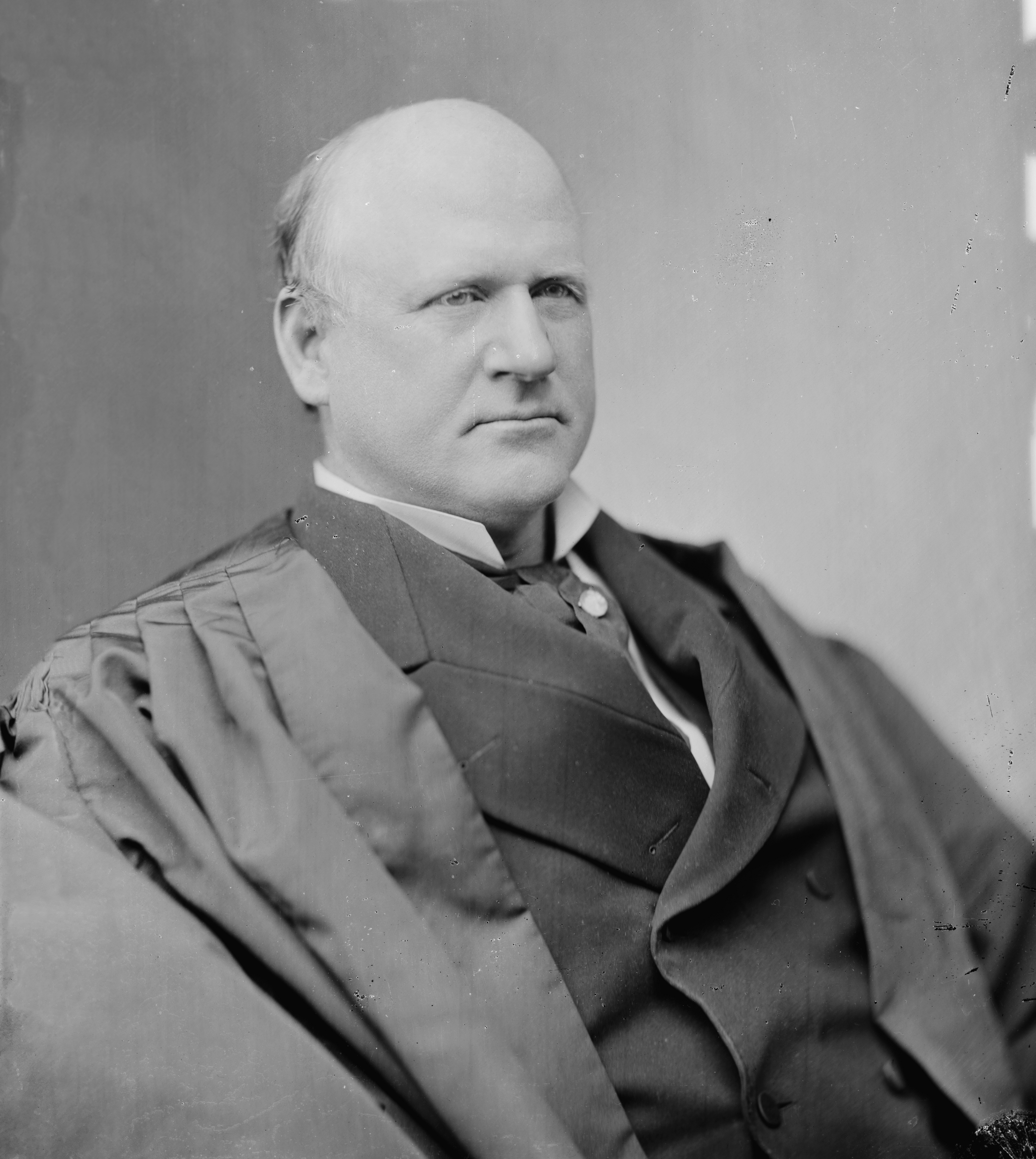
Justice John Marshall Harlan, who authored the first dissent in Lochner

Justice John Marshall Harlan wrote a dissenting opinion that was joined by Justices Edward Douglass White and William R. Day.

Harlan contended that the liberty to contract is subject to regulation imposed by a state acting within the scope of its police powers. He offered the following rule for determining whether such statutes are unconstitutional:

The power of the courts to review legislative action in respect of a matter affecting the general welfare exists only "when that which the legislature has done comes within the rule that, if a statute purporting to have been enacted to protect the public health, the public morals or the public safety, has no real or substantial relation to those objects, or is, beyond all question, a plain, palpable invasion of rights secured by the fundamental law."

Harlan asserted that the burden of proof should rest with the party seeking to have such a statute deemed unconstitutional.

Harlan argued that the Court gave insufficient weight to the state's argument that the law was a valid health measure addressing a legitimate state interest. He contended that it was "plain that this statute was enacted to protect the physical well-being of those who work in bakery and confectionery establishments." Responding to the majority's assertion that the profession of a baker was not an unhealthy one, he quoted at length from academic studies describing the respiratory ailments and other risks that bakers faced. He argued that the Supreme Court should have deferred to the New York Legislature's judgment that long working hours threatened the health of bakery employees: "If the end which the legislature seeks to accomplish be one to which its power extends, and if the means employed to that end, although not the wisest or best, are yet not plainly and palpably unauthorized by law, then the court cannot interfere."

==== Holmes ====
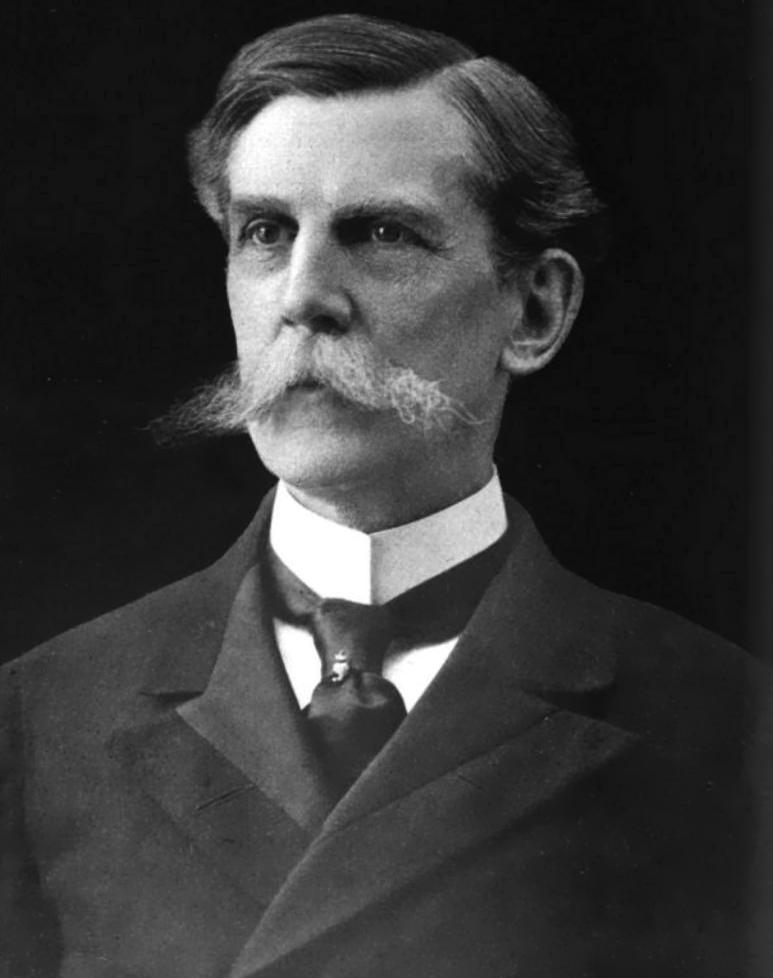
Justice Oliver Wendell Holmes Jr., who wrote the second dissent in Lochner

Justice Oliver Wendell Holmes Jr. also dissented from the Court's opinion and wrote a three-paragraph dissent that has become one of the most famous in U.S. Supreme Court history. Holmes began by accusing the majority of deciding Lochner's case by following laissez-faire economics rather than legal principles.

This case is decided upon an economic theory which a large part of the country does not entertain. If it were a question whether I agreed with that theory, I should desire to study it further and long before making up my mind. But I do not conceive that to be my duty, because I strongly believe that my agreement or disagreement has nothing to do with the right of a majority to embody their opinions in law. ... [A] Constitution is not intended to embody a particular economic theory, whether of paternalism and the organic relation of the citizen to the state or of laissez faire. It is made for people of fundamentally differing views ....

— Lochner, 198 U.S. at 75–76 (Holmes, J., dissenting).

Holmes pointed out that there were many American laws restricting citizens' freedom of contract that had never been found unconstitutional. As "ancient examples", Holmes pointed to usury laws, which set caps on interest rates for loans of money, and Sunday laws, which outlawed certain economic activities on Sundays in order to promote Christian observance of the Sabbath. Holmes analogized the majority's interpretation of the Fourteenth Amendment to the writings of Herbert Spencer, the 19th-century British sociologist who coined the term "survival of the fittest" and whose ideas later became associated with social Darwinism.

The liberty of the citizen to do as he likes so long as he does not interfere with the liberty of others to do the same, which has been a shibboleth for some well known writers, is interfered with by school laws, by the Post Office, by every state or municipal institution which takes his money for purposes thought desirable, whether he likes it or not. The Fourteenth Amendment does not enact Mr. Herbert Spencer's Social Statics.

— Lochner, 198 U.S. at 75 (Holmes, J., dissenting).

Holmes wrote that, in his view, a duly enacted state law could only be unconstitutional under the Due Process Clause's guarantee of liberty if it could rationally be said to "infringe fundamental principles" in the American tradition, and he maintained that the Bakeshop Act clearly did not do so.

Every opinion tends to become a law. I think that the word liberty in the Fourteenth Amendment is perverted when it is held to prevent the natural outcome of a dominant opinion, unless it can be said that a rational and fair man necessarily would admit that the statute proposed would infringe fundamental principles as they have been understood by the traditions of our people and our law. It does not need research to show that no such sweeping condemnation can be passed upon the statute before us.

— Lochner, 198 U.S. at 76 (Holmes, J., dissenting).

== Significance and legacy ==
The case is famous because there is virtually universal agreement among judges and scholars that it was incorrectly decided. More important, it is the case in which Justice Oliver Wendell Holmes wrote the most influential dissenting opinion in the Court's history.

— Retired Justice John Paul Stevens, writing in 2011.

The Supreme Court's due process jurisprudence over the next three decades was inconsistent, but it took a narrow view of states' police powers in several major labor cases after Lochner. For example, in Coppage v. Kansas (1915), the Court struck down statutes forbidding "yellow-dog contracts." Similarly, in Adkins v. Children's Hospital (1923), the Supreme Court held that minimum wage laws violated the due process clause, but Chief Justice William Howard Taft strongly dissented and suggested that the Court instead should have overruled Lochner. The doctrine of substantive due process was coupled with a narrow interpretation of congressional power under the Commerce Clause. Justices James McReynolds, George Sutherland, Willis Van Devanter, and Pierce Butler emerged during the 1920s and the 1930s as the foremost defenders of traditional limitations on government power on the Supreme Court and so were collectively dubbed by supporters of the New Deal the "Four Horsemen of Reaction." All four of them believed in laissez-faire economics.

In 1934, the Supreme Court decided in Nebbia v. New York that there is no constitutional fundamental right to freedom of contract. In 1937, the Supreme Court decided West Coast Hotel Co. v. Parrish, which expressly overruled Adkins and implicitly signaled the end of the Lochner era by repudiating the idea that freedom of contract should be unrestricted.

Although the Supreme Court did not explicitly overrule Lochner, it agreed to give more deference to the decisions of state legislatures. The Supreme Court sounded the death knell for economic substantive due process several years later in Williamson v. Lee Optical of Oklahoma (1955) by unanimously declaring, "The day is gone when this Court uses the Due Process Clause of the Fourteenth Amendment to strike down state laws, regulatory of business and industrial conditions, because they may be unwise, improvident, or out of harmony with a particular school of thought."

=== Modern substantive due process ===
Since the end of the Lochner era, the Supreme Court has applied a lower standard of review to confront restrictions on economic liberty. A higher standard is used in reviewing legislation infringing on personal liberties. A line of cases dating back to the 1923 opinion by Justice McReynolds in Meyer v. Nebraska, which cited Lochner as establishing limits on the police power, has established a privacy right under substantive due process. More recently, in Roe v. Wade (1973), the Supreme Court held that women have a privacy right to determine whether or not to have an abortion. In Planned Parenthood v. Casey (1992), the Supreme Court reaffirmed that right but no longer used the term "privacy" to describe it. The abortion right was later overruled in Dobbs v. Jackson Women's Health Organization (2022).

=== Scholarly reaction ===
The Supreme Court's decision in Lochner v. New York has been criticized by legal scholars. The law professor Bernard Siegan described it as "one of the most condemned cases in United States history." According to the Center for American Progress, a left-leaning thinktank, law professors often use Lochner, along with Plessy v. Ferguson and Korematsu v. United States, as examples of "how judges should not behave."

Lochner is sometimes used as shorthand for extreme right-wing constitutional theory. However, it has come under harsh criticism from conservative and libertarian jurists as well because Lochner embraced substantive due process, a doctrine that was arguably at odds with the original understanding of the Constitution. For example, the conservative legal scholar Robert Bork called the decision an "abomination" and the "quintessence of judicial usurpation of power." Similarly, former Attorney General Edwin Meese said that the Supreme Court "ignored the limitations of the Constitution and blatantly usurped legislative authority." Siegan, a self-described libertarian, described it as "a symbol of judicial dereliction and abuse."

Scholars have noted that when the Fourteenth Amendment was adopted in 1868, 27 of the 37 state constitutions had adopted references to Locke's labor theory of property, which typically said: "All men are by nature free and independent, and have certain inalienable rights, among which are those of enjoying and defending life and liberty, acquiring and possessing and protecting property: and pursuing and obtaining safety and happiness." As such clauses were "deeply rooted in American history and tradition," they likely informed the original meaning of the scope and nature of the fundamental rights protected by the Fourteenth Amendment in the eyes of Lochner-era justices.

However, the decision also has attracted libertarian defenders: the Cato Institute and the scholars Richard Epstein and Randy Barnett, who argue that it correctly protected economic liberty.

Barnett has argued that the decision was basically correct in its presumption in favor of liberty of contract and that the decision was wrong only by perpetuating the misinterpretation of the Fourteenth Amendment that had been established in the Slaughter-House Cases. According to Barnett, the liberty of contract is properly found in the Privileges or Immunities Clause, not in the Due Process Clause of the Fourteenth Amendment. David Bernstein, in Rehabilitating Lochner: Defending Individual Rights Against Progressive Reform, has argued that Lochner was well grounded in Supreme Court precedent and that its emphasis on limits to the states' police powers informed the Supreme Court's early civil liberties and civil rights cases.

== See also ==
- Anticanon
- List of United States Supreme Court cases, volume 198
- Slaughterhouse Cases, 83 U.S. 36 (1873)
- Munn v. Illinois, 94 U.S. 113 (1876)
- Mugler v. Kansas, 123 U.S. 623 (1887)
- Allgeyer v. Louisiana, 165 U.S. 578 (1897)
- Adkins v. Children's Hospital, 261 U.S. 525 (1923) case about the minimum wage
