= Lochner era =

Period in U.S. legal history, ~1900 to 1937

The Lochner era was a period in American legal history from around 1900 to 1937 in which the Supreme Court of the United States is said to have made it a common practice "to strike down economic regulations adopted by a State based on the Court's own notions of the most appropriate means for the State to implement its considered policies". The court did this by using its interpretation of substantive due process to strike down laws held to be infringing on economic liberty or private contract rights. The era takes its name from Lochner v. New York (1905), but may also be seen to begin with Allgeyer v. Louisiana (1897). The end is usually defined as coinciding with the overturning of a Lochner-era decision in West Coast Hotel Co. v. Parrish (1937).

The Supreme Court during the Lochner era has been described as "play[ing] a judicially activist but politically conservative role". The Court sometimes invalidated state and federal legislation that inhibited business or otherwise limited the free market, including minimum wage laws, federal (but not state) child labor laws, regulations of banking, insurance and transportation industries. The Lochner era ended when the Court's tendency to invalidate labor and market regulations came into direct conflict with Congress's regulatory efforts in the New Deal.

Since the 1930s, Lochner has been widely discredited as a product of a "bygone era" in legal history. Robert Bork called Lochner "the symbol, indeed the quintessence, of judicial usurpation of power". In his confirmation hearings to become Chief Justice, John Roberts said: "You go to a case like the Lochner case, you can read that opinion today and it's quite clear that they're not interpreting the law, they're making the law." He added that the Lochner court substituted its own judgment for the legislature's findings.

== Philosophical roots ==
The causes of the Lochner era have been the subject of debate. Matthew J. Lindsay, writing in the Harvard Law Review, recounts the view of Progressive commentators in the decades since the New Deal:

According to progressive scholars, American judges steeped in laissez-faire economic theory, who identified with the nation's capitalist class and harbored contempt for any effort to redistribute wealth or otherwise meddle with the private marketplace, acted on their own economic and political biases to strike down legislation that threatened to burden corporations or disturb the existing economic hierarchy. In order to mask this fit of legally unjustified, intellectually dishonest judicial activism, the progressive interpretation runs, judges invented novel economic "rights" – most notably "substantive due process" and "liberty of contract" – that they engrafted upon the Due Process Clause of the Fourteenth Amendment.

Citing more recent scholarship since the 1970s, Lindsay advances a more modern interpretation of the Lochner era:

The Lochner era is best understood not as a politically motivated binge of judicial activism, but rather as a sincere and principled, if sometimes anachronistic, “effort to maintain one of the central distinctions in nineteenth-century constitutional law — the distinction between valid economic regulation” calculated to serve the general good and invalid “class” legislation designed to extend special privileges to a favored class of beneficiaries.

Cass R. Sunstein, in an influential essay from 1987, describes the Lochner era as the result of a Court which believed market ordering under common law to be part of nature rather than a legal construct and sought to preserve natural distribution of wealth against redistributive regulations:

The Lochner Court required government neutrality and was skeptical of government "intervention"; it defined both notions in terms of whether the state had threatened to alter the common law distribution of entitlements and wealth, which was taken to be a part of nature rather than a legal construct. Once the common law system came to be seen as a product of legal rules, the baseline from which constitutional decisions were made had to shift. When the Lochner framework was abandoned in West Coast Hotel, the common law system itself appeared to be a subsidy to employers. The West Coast Hotel Court thus adopted an alternative baseline and rejected Lochner era understandings of neutrality and action.

Howard Gillman, in the book The Constitution Besieged: The Rise & Demise of Lochner Era Police Powers Jurisprudence, argues that the decisions of the era can be understood as adhering to a constitutional tradition rooted in the Founding Fathers' conception of appropriate and inappropriate policymaking in a commercial republic. A central tenet of this tradition was that government should not exhibit favoritism or hostility toward market competitors (referred to as "class legislation", which Gillman equates with the modern notion of special interests), and that it should exercise its police power in a neutral manner so as not to benefit one class over another. This would make for a faction free republic, with the underlying assumption that the American economy could provide for all citizens and social dependency as had been observed in Europe could be avoided. These ideas, according to Gillman, had been inherited by the Lochnerian judges, whose jurisprudence reflected a good faith attempt to preserve a tradition that was increasingly being undermined by changing industrial relations in the United States.

This view has been criticized by David E. Bernstein, who claims that Gillman overstates the importance of class legislation on the jurisprudence. Bernstein has also criticized Sunstein's thesis, arguing in part that the notion of a common law baseline runs counter to numerous decisions in which the Court upheld statutory replacements of common law rules, notably in the field of workers' compensation. Bernstein's view is that the Lochner era demonstrates "the Justices' belief that Americans had fundamental unenumerated constitutional rights" which were protected by the due process clause of the Fourteenth Amendment. In discovering these rights, "[t]he Justices had a generally historicist outlook, seeking to discover the content of fundamental rights through an understanding of which rights had created and advanced liberty among the Anglo-American people."

== Jurisprudence ==
The constitutional jurisprudence of the Lochner era is marked by the use of substantive due process to invalidate legislation held to infringe on economic liberties, particularly the freedom of contract. Between 1899 and 1937, the Supreme Court held 159 statutes unconstitutional under the due process and Equal Protection clauses (excluding civil rights cases), and another 25 were struck down in reference to the due process clause coupled with some other provision. The Court's interpretation of the due process clause during the Lochner era has been dubbed in contemporary scholarship as "economic substantive due process". This doctrine can be divided into three elements:

1. The due process clauses of the Fifth and Fourteenth Amendments, which limits the federal and state governments from making laws that deprive "any person of life, liberty, or property without due process of law", require protection for individual liberties from state action, in the Lochner case, the liberty to "purchase and sell labor".
2. These liberties are not absolute and can be regulated for a limited set of purposes, including the "safety, health, morals, and general welfare of the public."
3. The Court may examine legislation in order to ensure that the means used by the legislature to further its legitimate purposes are well-designed to achieve those purposes and not unduly restrictive of market choices.

In addition, the Court limited the power of the federal government under the Commerce Clause; restricting Congress' ability to regulate industrial production. It also showed a marked hostility towards labor unions and consistently voted to invalidate laws that aided union activity. This body of doctrine has been characterized as "laissez-faire constitutionalism", although this has been contested.

Scholars have noted that when the Fourteenth Amendment was adopted in 1868, 27 out of 37 state constitutions had provisions which typically said: "All men are by nature free and independent, and have certain inalienable rights, among which are those of enjoying and defending life and liberty, acquiring and possessing and protecting property: and pursuing and obtaining safety and happiness." As such clauses were "deeply rooted in American history and tradition," they likely informed the original meaning of the scope and nature of the fundamental rights protected by the Fourteenth Amendment in the eyes of Lochner-era Justices.

It should also be noted that two early cases that use substantive due process to protect civil liberties, Pierce v. Society of Sisters and Meyer v. Nebraska, were decided during the Lochner era. Michael J. Phillips writes that "due largely to their 'familial' nature, these two cases helped legitimize the modern substantive due process decisions creating the constitutional right to privacy."

== Beginning ==
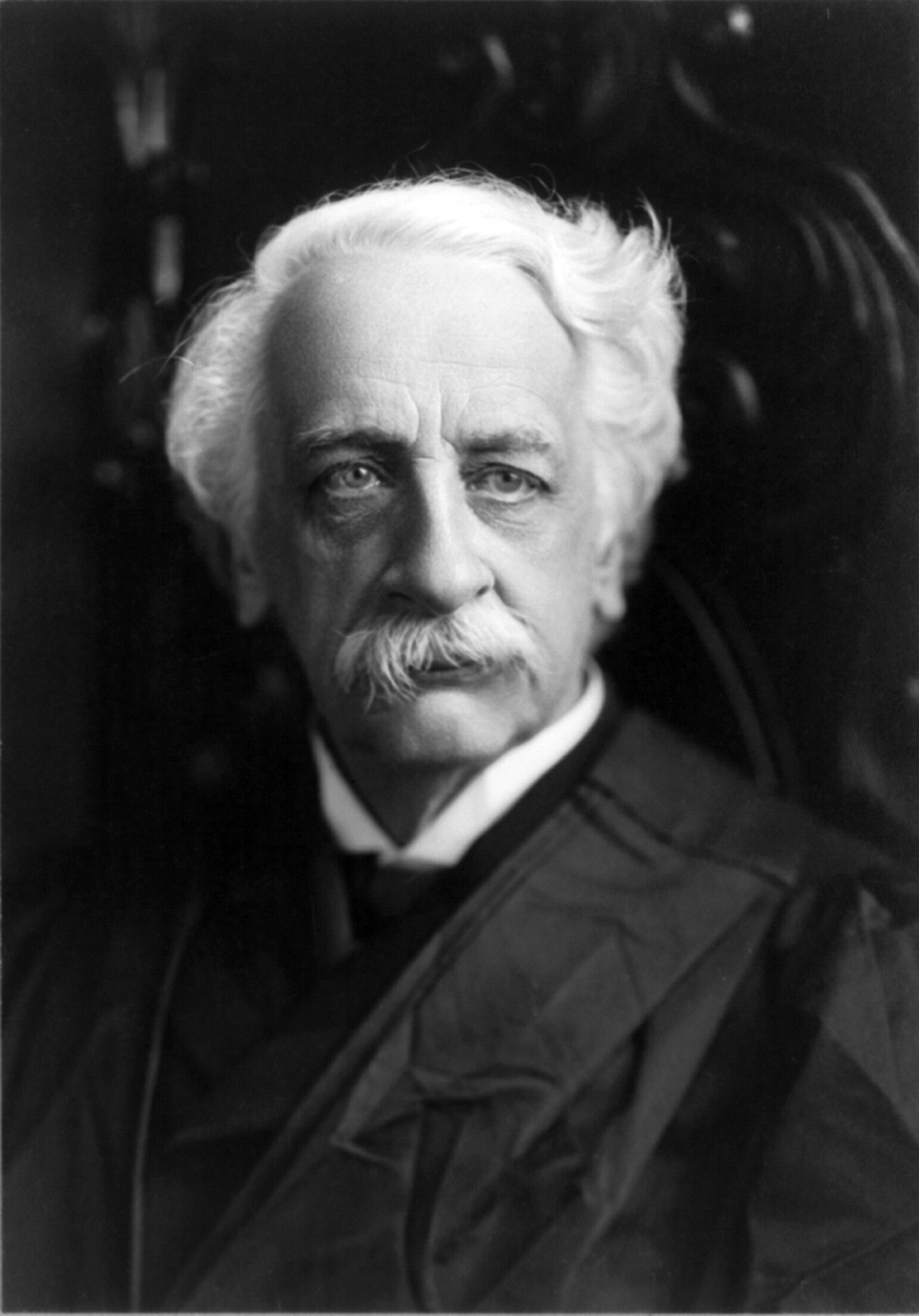
Justice Rufus Wheeler Peckham wrote the majority opinion in Lochner v. New York.

The case of Mugler v. Kansas (1887) is often regarded as a precursor to the Lochner era and the doctrine of economic substantive due process. Mugler had been convicted of violating a Kansas statute prohibiting the manufacture and sale of alcohol. He argued in part that the statute was unconstitutional under the due process clause of the Fourteenth Amendment. The Court affirmed the conviction, but stated its willingness to review the legitimacy of a state using its police power as potentially incompatible with substantive rights guaranteed by the due process clause:

If, therefore, a statute purporting to have been enacted to protect the public health, the public morals, or the public safety has no real or substantial relation to those objects, or is a palpable invasion of rights secured by the fundamental law, it is the duty of the courts to so adjudge, and thereby give effect to the Constitution.

The Court first held that the due process clause of the Fourteenth Amendment protected an individual's "liberty to contract" in the 1897 case of Allgeyer v. Louisiana. In a unanimous opinion, the Court stated that Fourteenth Amendment liberty includes:

... the right of the citizen to be free in the enjoyment of all his faculties; to be free to use them in all lawful ways; to live and work where he will; to earn his livelihood by any lawful calling; to pursue any livelihood or avocation; and for that purpose to enter into all contracts which may be proper, necessary and essential to his carrying out to a successful conclusion the purposes above mentioned.

In the era's namesake case of Lochner v. New York (1905), the Court struck down a New York State law limiting the number of hours bakers could work on the grounds that it violated the bakers' "right to contract". In the majority opinion in Lochner, Justice Rufus Peckham stated:

In every case that comes before this court, therefore, where legislation of this character is concerned and where the protection of the Federal Constitution is sought, the question necessarily arises: Is this a fair, reasonable and appropriate exercise of the police power of the State, or is it an unreasonable, unnecessary and arbitrary interference with the right of the individual to his personal liberty or to enter into those contracts in relation to labor which may seem to him appropriate or necessary for the support of himself and his family?

== Timeline and illustrative cases ==
The following Supreme Court decisions are usually considered to be representative of the Lochner era:

- United States v. E. C. Knight Co., 156 U.S. 1 (1895): limiting Congress' power to prevent monopolies
- Allgeyer v. Louisiana, 165 U.S. 578 (1897): striking down state legislation prohibiting foreign corporations from doing business in the state
- Atkin v. Kansas, 191 U.S. 207 (1903)
- Lochner v. New York, 198 U.S. 45 (1905): striking down state legislation limiting weekly working hours
- Adair v. United States, 208 U.S. 161 (1908): striking down federal legislation prohibiting railroad companies from demanding that a worker not join a labor union as a condition for employment ("yellow-dog contract")
- Loewe v. Lawlor, 208 U.S. 274 (1908): construing federal legislation not to exempt labor unions from antitrust lawsuits
- Smith v. Texas, 233 U.S. 630 (1914): striking down a state statute which prohibited anyone from serving as a train conductor who had not already served for two years as conductor or brakeman
- Coppage v. Kansas, 236 U.S. 1 (1915): striking down state legislation prohibiting yellow-dog contracts
- Truax v. Raich, 239 U.S. 33 (1915): striking down a state statute limiting the number of aliens that an employer could employ
- State Board of Control v Buckstegge, 158 Pac 837, 842 (1916): Arizona Supreme Court striking down a new state pension law
- Adams v. Tanner, 244 U.S. 590 (1917): striking down state legislation preventing privately owned employment agencies from assessing fees for their services
- Buchanan v. Warley, 245 U.S. 60 (1917): striking down a zoning ordinance that enforced residential segregation by prohibiting the sale of real property on the basis of ethnicity
- Hammer v. Dagenhart, 247 U.S. 251 (1918): striking down federal regulation of child labor
- Duplex Printing Press Co. v. Deering, 254 U.S. 443 (1921): construing federal legislation not to exempt labor unions from antitrust lawsuits
- Truax v. Corrigan, 257 U.S. 312 (1921): striking down a state statute prohibiting state courts from issuing injunctions against labor unions involved in disputes with employers over terms of employment
- Bailey v. Drexel Furniture Co., 259 U.S. 20 (1922): invalidating a federal tax on interstate commerce by employers hiring children
- Adkins v. Children's Hospital, 261 U.S. 525 (1923): striking down federal legislation mandating a minimum wage level for women and children in the District of Columbia
- Jay Burns Baking Co. v. Bryan, 264 U.S. 504 (1924): striking down a state statute prohibiting the manufacture or sale of loaves of bread weighing more or less than specified amounts
- Nichols v. Coolidge, 274 U.S. 531 (1927):
- Railroad Retirement Board v. Alton Railroad Co, 295 U.S. 330 (1935): striking down a compulsory contributory pension scheme for rail workers
- Louisville Joint Stock Land Bank v. Radford, 295 U.S. 555 (1935): striking down federal legislation that restricted the ability of banks to repossess farms
- United States v. Butler, 297 U.S. 1 (1936): construing congressional taxing power to invalidate the Agricultural Adjustment Act
- Carter v. Carter Coal Co., 298 U.S. 238 (1936): striking down federal legislation regulating the coal industry

== Ending ==
The Lochner era is usually considered to have ended with the overturning of Adkins v. Children's Hospital in the 1937 case of West Coast Hotel Co. v. Parrish. An often-cited account explaining the ending is that the Supreme Court bowed to political pressure after President Roosevelt's announcement of a legislative proposal to enlarge the Court. The Judicial Procedures Reform Bill of 1937 would have allowed for the President to appoint an additional Justice, up to a maximum of six, for every sitting member over the age of 70½. The official reason for the bill was that the older Justices were unable to handle the increasing workload; but it was widely recognized that the real purpose was to obtain favorable rulings on New Deal legislation that had previously been ruled unconstitutional. In West Coast Hotel, Justice Owen Roberts, who had previously voted to strike down similar legislation, joined the wing more sympathetic to the New Deal and upheld a Washington state law setting a minimum wage for women. Roberts' move came to be known as "the switch in time that saved nine" (the nine-justice Court) as Roosevelt's court-packing plan ultimately failed after the Court changed direction. Roosevelt believed that his overwhelming popular victory in the 1936 election had persuaded Roberts to sideline his own political beliefs and side with Chief Justice Hughes on New Deal cases.

This traditional interpretation of events has been disputed. Hughes himself wrote in his autobiographical notes that Roosevelt's court reform proposal "had not the slightest effect on our decision," but due to the delayed announcement of its decision the Court was seen as retreating under fire.

Barry Cushman, in Rethinking the New Deal Court: The Structure of a Constitutional Revolution, argues that the real shift occurred in Nebbia v. New York (1934), in which the Court by a one-vote majority upheld state legislation regulating the price of milk. In Cushman's view, the distinctive laissez-faire constitutionalism of the Lochner era eroded after World War I, as high unemployment made regulation of labor relations an increasingly pressing concern. This was accompanied by an evolving view of Congress' police power under the Commerce Clause to regulate in the public interest, even when this entered the previously delimited private sphere, undoing the underlying free-market constitutional doctrine which distinguished between public and private enterprise. Thus, the true cause for the demise of Lochner was not short-term political considerations, but the Court's evolving judicial perspective on the validity of governmental regulation.

Alan J. Meese has pointed out that several members of the Court, even after the decision in West Coast Hotel, continued to apply Lochnerian premises. The decision did not overrule Lochner v. New York or any other liberty-of-occupation case not involving an attempt to require employers to pay a subsistence wage. It was not until Roosevelt began appointing new Justices, starting with Hugo Black in August 1937, that a majority was formed which completely rejected Lochnerian reasoning. In United States v. Carolene Products Co. (1938), the Court held that the constitutional authority of state and federal legislatures over economic matters is plenary, and that laws passed to regulate such matters are entitled to a presumption of constitutionality. Black, in a 1949 opinion upholding a state law prohibiting union discrimination, wrote that the Court by then had repudiated "the Allgeyer-Lochner-Adair-Coppage constitutional doctrine".

== Assessment ==
The Lochner era has been criticized from the left for judicial activism, routinely overturning the will of Congress, and also for the Court's failure to allow the political process to redress increasingly unequal distributions of wealth and power.

Criticism among conservative scholars has focused on the use of substantive due process as a vehicle for protecting rights not explicitly mentioned in the Constitution. Robert Bork called the Court's decision in Lochner v. New York an "abomination" that "lives in the law as a symbol, indeed the quintessence of judicial usurpation of power."

The Lochner era has, however, found support among some libertarian scholars who defend the Court for "securing property rights and economic freedom". Richard A. Epstein has contested the widespread allegation of judicial activism, stating that "[t]he conceptual defense of the Lochner era is much stronger on structural grounds than its manifold critics commonly suppose." Michael J. Phillips, in the book The Lochner Court, Myth and Reality, makes the case that the conventional view of the Lochner era as deeply reactionary is misguided, and the Court's "occasional exercises of economic activism were not entirely, or even mainly, bad things." In Rehabilitating Lochner, David Bernstein argues that many of the civil liberties and civil rights innovations of the post-New Deal Court actually had their origins in Lochner era cases that have been forgotten or misinterpreted.

The Lochner era has notably been spotlighted by a number of non-American legal authorities as a cautionary tale of judicial overreaching, including Arthur Chaskalson, Antonio Lamer and Aharon Barak.

== See also ==
- History of the Supreme Court of the United States
- History of labor law in the United States
