= Allgeyer v. Louisiana =

- Supreme Court of the United States

Argued January 6, 1897 Decided March 1, 1897
- Full case name: E. Allgeyer & Co. v. Louisiana
- Citations: 165 U.S. 578 (more) 17 S. Ct. 427; 41 L. Ed. 832; 1897 U.S. LEXIS 1998

Case history
- Prior: Trial court held for defendant, Allgeyer. Louisiana Supreme Court reversed. 48 La. Ann. 104.

Holding
- 1. States may not prohibit citizens from contracting insurance out of state for acts performed outside the state.; 2. States may not prohibit citizens from contracting insurance out of state by written communication, even if the property to be insured is within the state.

Court membership
- Chief Justice Melville Fuller Associate Justices Stephen J. Field · John M. Harlan; Horace Gray · David J. Brewer; Henry B. Brown · George Shiras Jr. Edward D. White · Rufus W. Peckham

Case opinion
- Majority: Peckham, joined by unanimous

Laws applied
- U.S. Const. amend. XIV

Allgeyer v. Louisiana, 165 U.S. 578 (1897), was a landmark case of the Supreme Court of the United States in which a unanimous bench struck down a Louisiana statute for violating an individual's liberty of contract. It was the first case in which the Supreme Court interpreted the word liberty in the Due Process Clause of the Fourteenth Amendment to mean economic liberty. The decision marked the beginning of the Lochner era during which the Supreme Court struck many state regulations for infringing on an individual's right to contract. The Lochner era lasted 40 years and ended when West Coast Hotel Co. v. Parrish was decided in 1937.

== Statute ==
In 1894, the Louisiana legislature passed a statute, "An act to prevent persons, corporations or firms from dealing with marine insurance companies that have not complied with law." The ostensible purpose of the statute was to prevent fraud by requiring state citizens and corporations to abstain from business with out-of-state marine insurance companies. Compliance with the statute required all out-of-state insurance companies to have an appointed agent within the state. The text of the statute read:

That any person, firm or corporation who shall fill up, sign or issue in this State any certificate of insurance under an open marine policy, or who in any manner whatever does any act in this State to effect, for himself or for another, insurance on property, then in this State, in any marine insurance company which has not complied in all respects with the laws of this State, shall be subject to a fine of one thousand dollars, for each offense, which shall be sued for in any competent court by the attorney general for the use and benefit of the charity hospitals in New Orleans and in Shreveport.

== Case ==
On October 27, 1894, E. Allgeyer & Co. dispatched mail from New Orleans to the Atlantic Mutual Insurance Company in New York City to insure an international shipment of cotton, at the time in Louisiana, under an open policy that Allgeyer had with the insurance company.

On December 21, 1894, the State of Louisiana filed a petition in Orleans Parish court alleging Allgeyer had violated the statute in three counts and sought a cumulative fine of $3,000 (equivalent to $109,000 in 2024). Instead of offering an argument of innocence, Allgeyer challenged the statute on grounds for violating the Due Process Clause of the Fourteenth Amendment of the US Constitution.

The case went to trial, and the parish court entered a judgment for Allgeyer.

The Louisiana Supreme Court reversed the decision on appeal for one count and found that the other two counts were not proved. As a result, Allgeyer was fined $1,000 (equivalent to $36,000 in 2024).

== Issue ==
May a state prohibit a party within its jurisdiction from insuring property within the state through an out-of-state insurance company, which has no appointed agent within the state, if the insurance contract is made outside the state?

Attorneys for Allgeyer claimed that the statute violated both the Louisiana and the US Constitutions. They reasoned that liberty in the Due Process Clause entitled citizens to be free from arbitrary restrictions. In particular, the attorneys claimed the following:

- The statute deprived Allgeyer of property without due process
- The statute violated Allgeyer's right to equal protection
- The action prosecuted fell outside the jurisdiction of Louisiana, making the statute inapplicable.
- The insurance contracts and all business which transpired under them were under the jurisdiction of New York and so were lawfully made under that jurisdiction.
- Allgeyer had the right to perform all acts necessary to execute the contracts in Louisiana.

== Decision ==
A unanimous court held for Allgeyer. Associate Justice Rufus Peckham authored the opinion of the court that the statute violated the Fourteenth Amendment.

The 'liberty' mentioned in [the Fourteenth] amendment means not only the right of the citizen to be free from the mere physical restraint of his person, as by incarceration, but the term is deemed to embrace the right of the citizen to be free in the enjoyment of all his faculties, to be free to use them in all lawful ways, to live and work where he will, to earn his livelihood by any lawful calling, to pursue any livelihood or avocation, and for that purpose to enter into all contracts which may be proper, necessary, and essential to his carrying out to a successful conclusion the purposes above mentioned.

Justice Peckham then defined liberty by using the dissent of Associate Justice Joseph P. Bradley from the Slaughter-House Cases. However, Peckham did not give any indication of the limits of permissible inroads of state police power upon the right. He left such determinations to be made by future courts over "each case as it arises."

== See also ==
- Slaughter-House Cases, 83 U.S. 36 (1873)
- Munn v. Illinois, 94 U.S. 113 (1876)
- Mugler v. Kansas, 123 U.S. 623 (1887)
- Lochner v. New York, 198 U.S. 45 (1905)
