= Ah Sin v. Wittman =

- Supreme Court of the United States

Decided May 29, 1905
- Full case name: Ah Sin v. Wittman
- Citations: 198 U.S. 500 (more)

Holding
- To prove abuse of discretion in the enforcement of criminal law that violates the Equal Protection Clause, it is necessary to show that there were people of other races who committed the same crime without being prosecuted.

Court membership
- Chief Justice Melville Fuller Associate Justices John M. Harlan · David J. Brewer; Henry B. Brown · Edward D. White; Rufus W. Peckham · Joseph McKenna; Oliver W. Holmes Jr. · William R. Day

Case opinions
- Majority: McKenna
- Dissent: Peckham

Ah Sin v. Wittman, 198 U.S. 500 (1905), was a United States Supreme Court case in which the Court held that, to prove abuse of discretion in the enforcement of criminal law that violates the Equal Protection Clause, it is necessary to show that there were people of other races who committed the same crime without being prosecuted. This case involved anti-Chinese sentiment at the turn of the 20th century. Justice Rufus W. Peckham dissented without writing an opinion.
