= Ex parte Joins =

- Supreme Court of the United States

Argued October 19, 1903 Decided November 9, 1903
- Full case name: Ex parte Joins
- Citations: 191 U.S. 93 (more) 24 S. Ct. 27; 48 L. Ed. 110

Holding
- Held that a request for a writ of prohibition was moot, as the lower court case had already been completed prior to the petition being heard at the Supreme Court.

Court membership
- Chief Justice Melville Fuller Associate Justices John M. Harlan · David J. Brewer; Henry B. Brown · Edward D. White; Rufus W. Peckham · Joseph McKenna; Oliver W. Holmes Jr. · William R. Day

Case opinion
- Majority: Holmes, joined by unanimous

Laws applied
- 32 Stat. 641

Ex parte Joins, 191 U.S. 93 (1903), was a case in which the Supreme Court of the United States held that a request for a writ of prohibition was moot, as the lower court case had already been completed prior to the petition being heard at the Supreme Court.

== Background ==
In 1893, Congress created the Dawes Commission to break up the Five Civilized Tribes by allotting individual tribal members sections of land that previously had been held by the tribe. The tribes resisted this process and in 1896 Congress gave the commission the additional power to determine who were tribal members and allot tribal land to these members based on the tribal rolls that the commission prepared. An appeal of the decision of the commission was permitted to the United States district court for the Indian Territory and the court's decision was final.

Both the Choctaw and Chickasaw tribes prepared their own tribal rolls and presented these rolls to the commission. After arguments presented by tribal attorneys, the commission placed 2,075 on the rolls of the Five Civilized Tribes, out of approximately 75,000 applicants. At this point, tribal citizenship appeals moved to the federal courts. By 1902 Congress, in an effort to resolve the situation, created a new court, known as the Choctaw-Chickasaw Citizenship Court to determine the citizenship issues for the tribes. This court was also given the power to hear a bill in equity to vacate the decisions of the district courts, which it immediately did.

One of the claimants, Joins, then filed for a writ of prohibition to stop the Citizenship Court from hearing any cases. The Supreme Court granted certiorari to hear the case.

== Opinion of the Court ==
Justice Oliver Wendell Holmes Jr. delivered the opinion of the court. Holmes stated that since the Citizenship Court had already completed its work on the case, a writ of prohibition could not and would not issue. The petition was dismissed.
