= Substantive due process =

Legal principle

Substantive due process is a principle in United States constitutional law that allows courts to establish and protect substantive laws and certain fundamental rights from government interference, even if they are unenumerated elsewhere in the U.S. Constitution. Courts have asserted that such protections stem from the due process clauses of the Fifth and Fourteenth Amendments to the U.S. Constitution, which prohibit the federal and state governments, respectively, from depriving any person of "liberty ... without due process of law." Substantive due process demarcates the line between acts that courts deem subject to government regulation or legislation and those they consider beyond the reach of governmental interference. Whether the Fifth or Fourteenth Amendments were intended to serve that function continues to be a matter of scholarly and judicial discussion and dissent.

Substantive due process is to be distinguished from procedural due process. The distinction arises from the words "of law" in the phrase "due process of law". Procedural due process protects individuals from the coercive power of government by ensuring that adjudication processes, under valid laws, are fair and impartial. Such protections, for example, include sufficient and timely notice of why a party is required to appear before a court or other governmental body, the right to an impartial trier of fact and trier of law, and the right to give testimony and present relevant evidence at hearings. In contrast, substantive due process protects individuals against majoritarian policy enactments that exceed the limits of governmental authority: courts may find that a majority's enactment is not law and cannot be enforced as such, even if the processes of enactment and enforcement were actually fair.

The term was first used explicitly in 1930s legal casebooks as a categorical distinction of selected due process cases, and by 1952 Supreme Court opinions had mentioned it twice. The term "substantive due process" itself is commonly used in two ways: to identify a particular line of case law and to signify a particular political attitude toward judicial review under the two due process clauses.

Much substantive due process litigation involves legal challenges to the validity of unenumerated rights and seeks particular outcomes instead of merely contesting procedures and their effects. In successful cases, the Supreme Court recognizes a constitutionally based liberty and considers laws that seek to limit that liberty to be unenforceable or limited in scope. Critics of substantive due process decisions usually assert that such decisions should be left to the purview of more politically-accountable branches of government.

== Conceptual basics ==
The courts have viewed the Due Process Clause and sometimes other clauses of the Constitution as embracing the fundamental rights that are "implicit in the concept of ordered liberty". The rights have not been clearly identified and the Supreme Court's authority to enforce the unenumerated rights is unclear. Some of the rights have been said to be "deeply rooted" in American history and tradition; that phrase was used for rights related to the institution of the family.

The courts have largely abandoned the Lochner era approach (c. 1897–1937), when substantive due process was used to strike down minimum wage and labor laws to protect freedom of contract. Since then, the Supreme Court has decided that the Constitution protects numerous other freedoms, even if they are not in the text. If the federal courts' doctrine of substantive due process did not protect them, they could nevertheless be protected in other ways; for example, other provisions of the state or federal constitutions or legislatures protect some rights.

Today, the Supreme Court provides special protection for three types of rights under substantive due process in the Fourteenth Amendment – an approach which originated in United States v. Carolene Products Co., 304 U.S. 144 (1938), footnote 4:

- Rights enumerated in and derived from the first eight amendments to the Constitution
- The right to participate in the political process, such as the rights of voting, association, and free speech
- The rights of "discrete and insular minorities"

The Supreme Court usually looks first to see whether the right is a fundamental right by examining whether it is deeply rooted in American history and traditions. If the right is not a fundamental right, the court applies a rational basis test: if the violation of the right can be rationally related to a legitimate government purpose, the law is then held valid. If the court establishes that the right being violated is a fundamental right, it applies strict scrutiny and asks whether the law is necessary to achieve a compelling state interest and whether the law is narrowly tailored to address that interest.

== History of jurisprudence ==
Early in American judicial history, various jurists attempted to form theories of natural rights and natural justice to limit the power of government, especially on property and the rights of persons. Opposing "vested rights" were other jurists, who argued that the written constitution was the supreme law of the State and that judicial review could look only to that document, not to the "unwritten law" of "natural rights". Opponents also argued that the "police power" of government allowed legislatures to regulate the holding of property in the public interest, subject only to specific prohibitions of the written constitution.

=== Early origins ===
The phrase substantive due process was not used until the 20th century, but the concept arguably existed in the 19th century. The idea was a way to import natural law norms into the Constitution; prior to the American Civil War, the state courts were the site of the struggle. Critics of substantive due process claim that the doctrine began, at the federal level, with the infamous 1857 slavery case of Dred Scott v. Sandford. Advocates of substantive due process acknowledge that the doctrine was employed in Dred Scott but claim that it was employed incorrectly. Indeed, abolitionists and others argued that both before and after Dred Scott, the Due Process Clause actually prohibited the federal government from recognizing slavery.

The "vested rights" jurists saw the "law of the land" and "due process" clauses of state constitutions as restrictions on the substantive content of legislation. They were sometimes successful in arguing that certain government infringements were prohibited, regardless of procedure. For example, in 1856, the New York Court of Appeals held in Wynehamer v. New York that "without 'due process of law', no act of legislation can deprive a man of his property, and that in civil cases an act of the legislature alone is wholly inoperative to take from a man his property". However, in 1887 the U.S. Supreme Court subsequently rejected the rationale of Wynehamer. Other antebellum cases on due process include Murray's Lessee v. Hoboken Land & Improvement Co., which dealt with procedural due process, but the Supreme Court subsequently characterized the rationale of Murray, in the case of Hurtado v. California, as not providing "an indispensable test" of due process.

Another important pre-Civil War milestone in the history of due process was Daniel Webster's argument to the Supreme Court as counsel in Dartmouth College v. Woodward that the Due Process Clause forbids bills of attainder and various other types of depriving legislation. Nevertheless, the Supreme Court declined in the case to address that aspect of Webster's argument, the New Hampshire Supreme Court having already rejected it.

Roger Taney, in his Dred Scott opinion, pronounced without elaboration that the Missouri Compromise was unconstitutional because an "act of Congress that deprived a citizen of his liberty or property merely because he came himself or brought his property into a particular territory of the United States, and who had committed no offence against the laws, could hardly be dignified with the name of due process of law". In the case, neither Taney nor the dissenting Benjamin Robbins Curtis mentioned or relied upon the Court's previous discussion of due process in Murray, and Curtis disagreed with Taney about what "due process" meant.

=== Lochner era ===
Following the Civil War, the Fourteenth Amendment's due process clause prompted substantive due process interpretations to be urged on the Supreme Court as a limitation on state legislation. Initially, however, the Supreme Court rejected substantive due process as it came to be understood, including in the seminal Slaughter-House Cases. Beginning in the 1870s through the late 1880s, the Supreme Court hinted in dicta that various state statutes challenged under a different constitutional provision may have been invalidated under the due process clause. The first case to invalidate a state government economic regulation under this theory was Allgeyer v. Louisiana in 1897 which interpreted the word "liberty" in the due process clause to mean economic liberty. The Supreme Court would go on to impose on both federal and state legislation a firm judicial hand on property and economics right until the Great Depression in the 1930s.

The Court typically invalidated statutes during the Lochner era (named after Lochner v. New York) by declaring the statutes in violation of the right to contract. The Court invalidated state laws prohibiting employers from insisting, as a condition of employment, that their employees agree not to join a union. The Court also declared a state minimum wage law for women unconstitutional. Because many of the first applications protected the rights of corporations and employers to be free of governmental regulation, some scholars believe that substantive due process developed as a consequence of the Court's desire to accommodate 19th-century railroads and trusts.

=== Later development ===
The end of the Lochner era came in 1937 with the Supreme Court's holding in West Coast Hotel Co. v. Parrish. In that case, the Court upheld the state of Washington's "Minimum Wages for Women" act, reasoning that the Constitution permitted the restriction of liberty of contract by state law where such restriction protected the community, health and safety, or vulnerable groups.

Although economic due process restrictions on legislation were largely abandoned by the courts, substantive due process rights continue to be successfully asserted today in non-economic legislation that affects intimate issues like bodily integrity, marriage, religion, childbirth, child-rearing, and sexuality.

Privacy, which is not mentioned in the Constitution, was at issue in Griswold v. Connecticut, when the Court held, in 1965, that criminal prohibition of contraceptive devices for married couples violated federal, judicially enforceable privacy rights. The right to contraceptives was found in what the Court called the "penumbras", or shadow edges, of certain amendments that arguably refer to certain privacy rights, such as the First Amendment, which protects freedom of expression; the Third Amendment, which protects homes from being taken for use by soldiers; and the Fourth Amendment, which provides security against unreasonable searches. The penumbra-based rationale of Griswold has since been discarded; the Supreme Court now uses the Due Process Clause as a basis for various unenumerated privacy rights, as John Marshall Harlan II had argued in his concurring Griswold opinion, instead of relying on the "penumbras" and "emanations" of the Bill of Rights, as the majority opinion did in Griswold.

Although it has never been the majority view, some have argued that the Ninth Amendment, on unenumerated rights, could be used as a source of fundamental judicially enforceable rights, including a general right to privacy, as discussed by Arthur Goldberg in concurring in Griswold.

The Supreme Court also recognized a substantive due process right "to control the education of one's children", thus voiding state laws mandating for all students to attend public school. In Pierce v. Society of Sisters, the Supreme Court said in 1925:

We think it entirely plain that the Act of 1922 unreasonably interferes with the liberty of parents and guardians to direct the upbringing and education of children under their control. As often heretofore pointed out, rights guaranteed by the Constitution may not be abridged by legislation which has no reasonable relation to some purpose within the competency of the state. The fundamental theory of liberty upon which all governments in this Union repose excludes any general power of the state to standardize its children by forcing them to accept instruction from public teachers only.

Some justices have argued, however, that a substantive due process claim may not be necessary in cases of this type, as it is possible for those laws to be deemed to violate "First Amendment principles" as well. Justice Anthony Kennedy speculated in the 2000 case of Troxel v. Granville that current Supreme Court doctrine prohibits the judiciary from using the Due Process Clause instead of an applicable specific constitutional provision if one is available.

The right to marry a person of a different race was addressed in Loving v. Virginia, in which the Court said, in 1967, that its decision striking down anti-miscegenation laws could be justified either by substantive due process, or by the Equal Protection Clause. The unconstitutionality of bans on and refusals to recognize same-sex marriage was decided partly on substantive due process grounds by Obergefell v. Hodges in 2015. A right to have children was addressed in Skinner v. Oklahoma, but the Court in Skinner, in 1942, explicitly declined to base its decision on due process but instead cited the Equal Protection Clause since the Oklahoma law required sterilization of some three-time felons but not others. A substantive due process right of a parent to educate a young child (before ninth grade) in a foreign language was recognized in Meyer v. Nebraska, in 1923, with two justices dissenting, and Justice Kennedy has mentioned that Meyer might be decided on different grounds in modern times. Laws that "shock the conscience" of the Court were generally deemed unconstitutional, in 1952, in Rochin v. California, but in concurring, Justices Black and Douglas argued that pumping a defendant's stomach for evidence should have been deemed unconstitutional on the narrower ground that it violates the Fifth Amendment's right against self-incrimination. The Court, in O'Connor v. Donaldson, in 1975, said that due process is violated by confining a nondangerous mentally ill person who is capable of surviving safely in freedom. Chief Justice Burger's concurring opinion was that such confinement may also amount to "punishment" for being mentally ill, violating the Court's interpretation of the Eighth Amendment in Robinson v. California. Freedom from excessive punitive damages was deemed to be a due process right in BMW v. Gore, in 1996, but four justices disagreed. The Court, in Cruzan v. Missouri, decided, in 1990, that due process is not violated if a state applies "a clear and convincing evidence standard in proceedings where a guardian seeks to discontinue nutrition and hydration of a person diagnosed to be in a persistent vegetative state".

==== The Glucksberg Test ====
In Washington v. Glucksberg (1997), the Court articulated a "history and tradition" test, which consists of two prongs: whether the asserted right was narrowly articulated, and whether such articulation was "deeply rooted in the nation's history". This test has been inconsistently applied, most notably being relied upon by the majority opinion in Dobbs v. Jackson Women's Health Organization (2022).

== Criticisms ==
Critics argue that judges are making determinations of policy and morality that properly belong with legislators ("legislating from the bench"), that they are reading doctrines and principles into the Constitution that are not expressed in or implied by the document, or that they are claiming power to expand the liberty of some people at the expense of other people's liberty (such as in Dred Scott v. Sandford).

Justice Oliver Wendell Holmes Jr., a proponent of legal realism, worried that the Court was overstepping its boundaries and wrote, in 1930, in one of his last dissents:

I have not yet adequately expressed the more than anxiety that I feel at the ever increasing scope given to the Fourteenth Amendment in cutting down what I believe to be the constitutional rights of the States. As the decisions now stand, I see hardly any limit but the sky to the invalidating of those rights if they happen to strike a majority of this Court as for any reason undesirable. I cannot believe that the Amendment was intended to give us carte blanche to embody our economic or moral beliefs in its prohibitions. Yet I can think of no narrower reason that seems to me to justify the present and the earlier decisions to which I have referred. Of course the words due process of law, if taken in their literal meaning, have no application to this case; and while it is too late to deny that they have been given a much more extended and artificial signification, still we ought to remember the great caution shown by the Constitution in limiting the power of the States, and should be slow to construe the clause in the Fourteenth Amendment as committing to the Court, with no guide but the Court's own discretion, the validity of whatever laws the States may pass.

Originalists, such as Supreme Court Justices Clarence Thomas, who rejects the substantive due process doctrine, and Antonin Scalia, who also questioned the legitimacy of the doctrine, have called substantive due process a "judicial usurpation" or an "oxymoron". Both Scalia and Thomas occasionally joined Court opinions that mention the doctrine and, in their dissents, often argued over how substantive due process should be employed based on Court precedent.

Many non-originalists, like Justice Byron White, have also been critical of substantive due process. As propounded in his dissents in Moore v. East Cleveland and Roe v. Wade, as well as his majority opinion in Bowers v. Hardwick, White argued that the doctrine of substantive due process gives the judiciary too much power over the governance of the nation and takes away such power from the elected branches of government. He argued that the fact that the Court has created new substantive rights in the past should not lead it to "repeat the process at will". In his book Democracy and Distrust, non-originalist John Hart Ely criticized "substantive due process" as a glaring non sequitur. Ely argued the phrase was both a contradiction in terms, like the phrase green pastel redness, and radically undemocratic by allowing judges to impose substantive values on the political process. Ely argued that the courts should serve to reinforce the democratic process, not to displace the substantive value choices of the people's elected representatives.

An alternative to strict originalist theory is advocated by former Supreme Court Justice Stephen Breyer, one of the Court's supporters of substantive due process rights. Breyer believes the justices need to look at cases in light of how their decisions will promote what he calls "active liberty", the Constitution's aim of promoting participation by citizens in the processes of government. That is an approach that ostensibly emphasizes "the document's underlying values" and a broad look at a law's purpose and consequences. Critics charge that such an approach would also give judges the ability to look very broadly at the consequences and unwritten purpose of constitutional provisions, such as the Due Process Clause, thus removing issues from the democratic process.

Originalism is usually linked to opposition against substantive due process rights, and the reasons can be found in the following explanation that was endorsed unanimously by the Supreme Court in the 1985 case University of Michigan v. Ewing: "we must always bear in mind that the substantive content of the [Due Process] Clause is suggested neither by its language nor by preconstitutional history; that content is nothing more than the accumulated product of judicial interpretation of the Fifth and Fourteenth Amendments."

Originalists do not necessarily oppose protection of rights protected by substantive due process. Most originalists believe that such rights should be identified and protected legislatively or by further constitutional amendments or other existing provisions of the Constitution. For example, some substantive due process liberties may be protectable according to the original meaning of the Privileges or Immunities Clause of the Fourteenth Amendment. Most originalists believe that rights should be identified and protected by the majority legislatively or, if legislatures lack the power, by constitutional amendments.

The original perceived scope of the Due Process Clause was different from the one in use today. For instance, even though many of the Framers of the Bill of Rights believed that slavery violated the fundamental natural rights of African Americans, legal scholar Robert Cover argued in 1975 that a "theory that declared slavery to be a violation of the due process clause of the Fifth Amendment ... requires nothing more than a suspension of reason concerning the origin, intent, and past interpretation of the clause". The Thirteenth Amendment ultimately abolished slavery and removed the federal judiciary from the business of returning fugitive slaves. Until then, it was "scarcely questioned" (as Abraham Lincoln put it) that the Constitution "was intended by those who made it, for the reclaiming of what we call fugitive slaves; and the intention of the law-giver is the law".

== Judicial review ==
When a law or other act of government is challenged as a violation of individual liberty under the Due Process Clause, courts now use two forms of scrutiny or judicial review. The inquiry balances the importance of the governmental interest being served and the appropriateness of the method of implementation against the resulting infringement of individual rights. If the governmental action infringes upon a fundamental right, the highest level of review, strict scrutiny, is used. To pass strict scrutiny, the law or the act must be both narrowly tailored and the least restrictive means of furthering a compelling government interest.

If the governmental restriction restricts liberty in a manner that does not implicate a fundamental right, rational basis review is used, which determines whether a law or act is rationally related to a legitimate government interest. The government's goal must be something that it is acceptable for the government to pursue. The legislation must use reasonable means to the government's goals but not necessarily the best. Under a rational basis test, the burden of proof is on the challenger so laws are rarely overturned by a rational basis test.

There is also a middle level of scrutiny, called intermediate scrutiny, but it is used primarily in Equal Protection cases, rather than in Due Process cases: "The standards of intermediate scrutiny have yet to make an appearance in a due process case." To pass intermediate scrutiny, the challenged law must further an important government interest by means that are substantially related to that interest.

== See also ==
- Thomas M. Cooley § Development of constitutional law jurisprudence as to due process of law

== Sources ==
- Bernstein, David Eliot (2016). "The History Of 'Substantive' Due Process: It's Complicated" (PDF). Texas Law Review. 95 (1): 1–11. SSRN 2908130.
- Lewis, Thomas Tandy (2001). "The Ironic History of Substantive Due Process: Three Constitutional Revolutions". International Social Science Review. 76 (1/2): 21–35. JSTOR 41887055.
- Katz, Claudio J. (2013). "Protective Labor Legislation in the Courts: Substantive Due Process and Fairness in the Progressive Era". Law and History Review. 31 (2): 275–323. doi:10.1017/S0738248013000047. JSTOR 23489482. ProQuest 1426551656.
- Keynes, Edward (1996). Liberty, Property, and Privacy. doi:10.1515/9780271072715. ISBN 978-0-271-07271-5.
- White, G. Edward (2000). The Constitution and the New Deal. Harvard University Press. doi:10.2307/j.ctv1smjtdq. ISBN 978-0-674-00341-5. JSTOR j.ctv1smjtdq.
