= McLoughlin v. Raphael Tuck & Sons Co. =

- Supreme Court of the United States

Argued November 11–12, 1903 Decided November 30, 1903
- Full case name: McLoughlin v. Raphael Tuck & Sons Co.
- Citations: 191 U.S. 267 (more) 24 S. Ct. 105; 48 L. Ed. 178

Holding
- The Constitution prohibits ex-post facto law, so articles of a class made illegal by a statute that existed in the United States before the statute came into effect are still legal. The statute in question specifically immunized such items, so the lower courts were affirmed.

Court membership
- Chief Justice Melville Fuller Associate Justices John M. Harlan · David J. Brewer; Henry B. Brown · Edward D. White; Rufus W. Peckham · Joseph McKenna; Oliver W. Holmes Jr. · William R. Day

Case opinion
- Majority: White, joined by Fuller, Harlan, Brewer, Brown, Peckham, McKenna, Day
- Holmes took no part in the consideration or decision of the case.

McLoughlin v. Raphael Tuck & Sons Co., 191 U.S. 267 (1903), was a United States Supreme Court ruling dealing with copyright. It dealt with the interpretation of Section 4963 of the Revised Statutes of the United States before and after the pertinent section's amendment in 1897.

== Background ==
Originally, Section 4963 forbade any person from stamping a work as copyrighted while not holding the pertinent copyright. The section included a $50 bounty for the person who identified the illicit article and sued, with another $50 going to the government, paid by the printer of the material.

On 3 March 1897, the section was amended to also specifically forbid knowingly selling or importing articles falsely stamped as copyrighted in the United States, whether or not the article was subject to copyright in the United States at all. Importantly, the amendment also noted that these new rules did not apply to articles brought into the country before the amendment's adoption, preventing ex post facto law and observing Article 1, Section 9 of the Constitution.

The case dealt with 83 books and pamphlets with false copyright marks that had been printed outside the United States, identified by the plaintiff, James McLoughlin. McLoughlin was suing for Section 4963's bounty. The defendants, Raphael Tuck and Sons Co., admitted that the marks were false, but proved that the articles in question had been imported before the 1897 amendment to Section 4963. Because the amendment provided immunity to articles imported before its inaction, the lower courts ruled in the defendants' favor. Appeals eventually moved the case to the Supreme Court.

== Opinion of the Court ==
The lower court's rulings in favor of the defendant were affirmed by the Supreme Court. The Court questioned the quality of certain testimony in the case, but did not consider that relevant to the statutory question.

Justice Oliver Wendell Holmes Jr. did not hear this argument and was not party to the decision.
