= United States v. Ju Toy =

US v. Ju Toy
- Supreme Court of the United States

Argued April 3, 1905 Decided May 8, 1905
- Full case name: United States v. Ju Toy
- Citations: 198 U.S. 253 (more) 25 S. Ct. 644; 49 L. Ed. 1040

Case history
- Prior: Federal District Court ruled that Ju Toy was a person native to the United States and ordered his release.

Holding
- The petition for habeas corpus should have been denied, refusing entry at a port does not deny due process and the findings of the immigration officials were conclusive and not subject to judicial review.

Court membership
- Chief Justice Melville Fuller Associate Justices John M. Harlan · David J. Brewer; Henry B. Brown · Edward D. White; Rufus W. Peckham · Joseph McKenna; Oliver W. Holmes Jr. · William R. Day

Case opinions
- Majority: Holmes, joined by Fuller, Harlan, Brown, White, McKenna
- Dissent: Brewer, joined by Peckham, Day

United States v. Ju Toy, 198 U.S. 253 (1905), is a United States Supreme Court case in which the Supreme Court conceded its right to judicial review over immigration matters. The case held that "a citizen of Chinese parentage seeking admission to the United States" could be excluded by the administrative immigration authorities, even when being denied a hearing before a judicial body on the question whether they were indeed a citizen. The Court determined that refusing entry at a port does not deny due process and held that findings by immigration officials are conclusive and not subject to judicial review unless there is evidence of bias or negligence. This case marked a shift in the court in respect to habeas corpus petitions and altered the judicial landscape for citizens applying for admission into the United States as well as for those facing deportation.

== History ==
The Chinese Exclusion Act of 1882 prohibited the immigration of Chinese laborers for a period of ten years and restricted all Chinese immigrants from obtaining naturalized citizenship, while at the same time allowing "merchants, teachers, students, travelers, and diplomats" to be exempt from these exclusions. Chinese in the United States before the 1882 Chinese Exclusion Act was passed were able to return without impediment to the United States if they "obtained a certificate before their departure and could produce this document upon their return". In 1888, Congress passed the Scott Act which revoked the right of Chinese laborers to re-enter the United States after visiting China. The Scott Act was renewed with the passing of the Geary Act in 1892 which also "required all alien Chinese then residing in the United States to register" and those caught without their registration form on their person could potentially be arrested or deported. The combination of these acts increased the restrictions on and exclusion of Chinese and Chinese Americans. As a result the Chinese combatted discrimination and exclusion through the judicial system, often via petition of habeas corpus, and many Chinese found relief through the judicial system until the United States v. Ju Toy decision.

Ju Toy was a Chinese man who had been born in the United States and was not subject to the 1882 Chinese Exclusion Act nor the Scott Act of 1888. Ju Toy visited China and returned to San Francisco on the steamship Doric, but on his return Ju Toy was denied permission to land and was ordered to be deported by immigration officials even though he was not an immigrant. Ju Toy then sued out of a writ of habeas corpus from a Federal District Court. The Federal District Court ruled that Ju Toy was a person native to the United States and ordered his release. The Government appealed and the case was brought to the Supreme Court and heard for arguments on April 3, 1905.

== Ruling ==
Justice Holmes delivered the majority opinion on May 8, 1905. The majority held that the petition for habeas corpus should have been denied because it alleged nothing except citizenship and since it "disclosed neither abuse of authority nor the existence of evidence not laid before the Secretary". The Supreme Court maintained that while the acts of Congress give no authority to exclude citizens, the acts grants administrative officials the power to determine finally whether or not a given person is a citizen. Holmes argued that even if Ju Toy was a native American, he could not get any relief from the Courts since the findings of the immigration officials were conclusive and not subject to judicial review. The Supreme Court determined that refusing entry at a port does not deny due process since due process can be given without a judicial trial for citizens applying for admission. Therefore Ju Toy could not obtain reprieve from the judicial system and was subject to be deported to China.

=== Dissenting opinion ===
Justice Brewer with Justice Peckham dissented. Justice Day also dissented. The dissent argued that Ju Toy had been judicially determined to be a "free-born American citizen" and has been guilty of no crime since returning to one's native land is not a crime for citizens. Brewer contested that allowing a citizen, guilty of no crime, to be deported without a trial by jury, and without judicial examination, strips him of all his rights which are given to a citizen.

== Significance ==
Prior to US v. Ju Toy, many Chinese employed the judicial system to "temper the effects of exclusion", but after the Ju Toy decision, the Chinese lost an important measure to resisting exclusion, since they could no longer use courts in the same way to review the administrative decisions that denied them entry. As a result of the decision, as well as the legislation passed in the United States, China launched a dramatic boycott of American goods in protest, a sign that the struggle over Chinese exclusion had not ended. After the decision, the Court received much criticism, especially regarding the Court's serious departure from constitutional principles. Some of the greatest criticism surrounded Holmes' contention that due process did not require a judicial trial for citizens applying for admission. In prior cases, the Court had made distinctions between the constitutional rights of aliens and of citizens, "holding that aliens could not use the Constitution to shield themselves from administrative actions". With the decision of Ju Toy, the Court blurred the distinction between alien and citizens and determined that both are subject to the same bureaucratic discretion and authority. This decision placed alleged citizens on the same level in admission proceedings before the Bureau of Immigration.

However, even though discomfort with the decision persisted, the Court's basic holding endured, and Federal courts no longer had to investigate the right of a petitioner to enter the United States, accepting the Bureau of Immigration's investigation as final and refusing to hear new evidence. The Ju Toy decision also granted immigration officials the power to determine whether an individual applying for admission to their own country was in fact a citizen authorized to enter through the port, since due process could be satisfied by summary administrative proceedings. After United States v. Ju Toy, the number of habeas corpus petitions filed by Chinese in the Northern District of California plummeted from 153 cases in 1904, to 32 in 1905 and to 9 in 1906. The Ju Toy decision also led the district court in San Francisco to often dismiss Chinese petitions for habeas corpus, unless "there was evidence that the officials had taken unlawful or arbitrary action". This decision curtailed Chinese access to courts concerning admission decisions, allowing the Bureau of Immigration to create their own admission proceedings, yet deportation decisions still rested with the judicial courts.

In 1917, Congress removed the provision "allowing Chinese a judicial hearing in deportation cases". This allowed for immigration officials to arrest Chinese for deportation under general immigration laws and use their own judicial system, unless the deportable offense came solely under the Chinese Exclusion Act, in which case a judicial hearing was still required. In 1910, the Ninth Circuit Court of Appeals extended the ruling in Ju Toy to allow the bureau complete control over the deportation of alleged citizens as well. These combined actions stemming from the Ju Toy decision provided the Immigration Bureau with the authority over all immigration matters and led to the creation of the American contemporary immigration judicial system.

However, the Court came to a different conclusion in 1922, that habeas corpus petitioners are entitled to a de novo judicial hearing to determine whether they are U.S. citizens. In Ng Fung Ho v. White, the Court held that to deport a detainee who claimed U.S. citizenship "obviously deprives him of liberty," and that "[j]urisdiction in the executive to order deportation exists only if the person arrested is an alien. The claim of citizenship is thus a denial of an essential jurisdictional fact."
