= List of United States Supreme Court cases, volume 191 =

Supreme Court of the United States
- Interactive map of Supreme Court of the United States
- 38°53′26″N 77°00′16″W
- Established: March 4, 1789; 236 years ago
- Location: Washington, D.C.
- Coordinates: 38°53′26″N 77°00′16″W
- Composition method: Presidential nomination with Senate confirmation
- Authorised by: Constitution of the United States, Art. III, § 1
- Judge term length: life tenure, subject to impeachment and removal
- Number of positions: 9 (by statute)
- Website: supremecourt.gov

This is a list of cases reported in volume 191 of United States Reports, decided by the Supreme Court of the United States in 1903.

== Justices of the Supreme Court at the time of volume 191 U.S. ==
The Supreme Court is established by Article III, Section 1 of the Constitution of the United States, which says: "The judicial Power of the United States, shall be vested in one supreme Court . . .". The size of the Court is not specified; the Constitution leaves it to Congress to set the number of justices. Under the Judiciary Act of 1789 Congress originally fixed the number of justices at six (one chief justice and five associate justices). Since 1789 Congress has varied the size of the Court from six to seven, nine, ten, and back to nine justices (always including one chief justice).

When the cases in volume 191 were decided the Court comprised the following nine members:

Portrait	Justice	Office	Home State	Succeeded	Date confirmed by the Senate (Vote)	Tenure on Supreme Court
	Melville Fuller	Chief Justice	Illinois	Morrison Waite	July 20, 1888 (41–20)	October 8, 1888 – July 4, 1910 (Died)
	John Marshall Harlan	Associate Justice	Kentucky	David Davis	November 29, 1877 (Acclamation)	December 10, 1877 – October 14, 1911 (Died)
	David Josiah Brewer	Associate Justice	Kansas	Stanley Matthews	December 18, 1889 (53–11)	January 6, 1890 – March 28, 1910 (Died)
	Henry Billings Brown	Associate Justice	Michigan	Samuel Freeman Miller	December 29, 1890 (Acclamation)	January 5, 1891 – May 28, 1906 (Retired)
	Edward Douglass White	Associate Justice	Louisiana	Samuel Blatchford	February 19, 1894 (Acclamation)	March 12, 1894 – December 18, 1910 (Continued as chief justice)
	Rufus W. Peckham	Associate Justice	New York	Howell Edmunds Jackson	December 9, 1895 (Acclamation)	January 6, 1896 – October 24, 1909 (Died)
	Joseph McKenna	Associate Justice	California	Stephen Johnson Field	January 21, 1898 (Acclamation)	January 26, 1898 – January 5, 1925 (Retired)
	Oliver Wendell Holmes Jr.	Associate Justice	Massachusetts	Horace Gray	December 4, 1902 (Acclamation)	December 8, 1902 – January 12, 1932 (Retired)
	William R. Day	Associate Justice	Ohio	George Shiras Jr.	February 23, 1903 (Acclamation)	March 2, 1903 – November 13, 1922 (Retired)

== Citation style ==
Under the Judiciary Act of 1789 the federal court structure at the time comprised District Courts, which had general trial jurisdiction; Circuit Courts, which had mixed trial and appellate (from the US District Courts) jurisdiction; and the United States Supreme Court, which had appellate jurisdiction over the federal District and Circuit courts—and for certain issues over state courts. The Supreme Court also had limited original jurisdiction (i.e., in which cases could be filed directly with the Supreme Court without first having been heard by a lower federal or state court). There were one or more federal District Courts and/or Circuit Courts in each state, territory, or other geographical region.

The Judiciary Act of 1891 created the United States Courts of Appeals and reassigned the jurisdiction of most routine appeals from the district and circuit courts to these appellate courts. The Act created nine new courts that were originally known as the "United States Circuit Courts of Appeals." The new courts had jurisdiction over most appeals of lower court decisions. The Supreme Court could review either legal issues that a court of appeals certified or decisions of court of appeals by writ of certiorari.

Bluebook citation style is used for case names, citations, and jurisdictions.

- "# Cir." = United States Court of Appeals
  - e.g., "3d Cir." = United States Court of Appeals for the Third Circuit
- "C.C.D." = United States Circuit Court for the District of . . .
  - e.g.,"C.C.D.N.J." = United States Circuit Court for the District of New Jersey
- "D." = United States District Court for the District of . . .
  - e.g.,"D. Mass." = United States District Court for the District of Massachusetts
- "E." = Eastern; "M." = Middle; "N." = Northern; "S." = Southern; "W." = Western
  - e.g.,"C.C.S.D.N.Y." = United States Circuit Court for the Southern District of New York
  - e.g.,"M.D. Ala." = United States District Court for the Middle District of Alabama
- "Ct. Cl." = United States Court of Claims
- The abbreviation of a state's name alone indicates the highest appellate court in that state's judiciary at the time.
  - e.g.,"Pa." = Supreme Court of Pennsylvania
  - e.g.,"Me." = Supreme Judicial Court of Maine

== List of cases in volume 191 U.S. ==
Case Name	Page and year	Opinion of the Court	Concurring opinion(s)	Dissenting opinion(s)	Lower Court	Disposition
The Southwark	1 (1903)	Day	none	none	3d Cir.	reversed
The Robert W. Parsons	17 (1903)	Brown	none	Brewer	N.Y. Sup. Ct.	reversed
Wright v. Morgan	55 (1903)	Holmes	none	none	8th Cir.	affirmed
Ross v. Aguirre	60 (1903)	McKenna	none	none	C.C.N.D. Cal.	affirmed
Choctaw, Oklahoma and Gulf Railroad Company v. McDade	64 (1903)	Day	none	none	6th Cir.	affirmed
Hubbert v. Campbellsville Lumber Company	70 (1903)	Brewer	none	none	6th Cir.	affirmed
Kinney v. Columbia Savings and Loan Association	78 (1903)	Brewer	none	none	C.C.D. Utah	affirmed
United States v. Denver and Rio Grand Railroad Company	84 (1903)	Brown	none	none	Sup. Ct. Terr. N.M.	reversed
Ex parte Joins	93 (1903)	Holmes	none	none	C. and C. C'ship Ct.	prohibition denied
Ex parte Blake	102 (1903)	per curiam	none	none	C. and C. C'ship Ct.	prohibition denied
Eckington and Soldiers' Home Railway Company v. McDevitt	103 (1903)	Fuller	none	none	D.C. Cir.	reversed
Holden v. Stratton	115 (1903)	Fuller	none	none	9th Cir.	dismissed
Continental National Bank of Memphis v. Buford	119 (1903)	Harlan	none	none	8th Cir.	dismissed
Howard v. Fleming	126 (1903)	Brewer	none	none	multiple	multiple
Smith v. Indiana	138 (1903)	Brown	none	none	Ind.	dismissed
City of Joplin v. Southwest Missouri Light Company	150 (1903)	McKenna	none	none	C.C.W.D. Mo.	reversed
St. Louis Hay and Grain Company v. United States	159 (1903)	Holmes	none	none	Ct. Cl.	affirmed
Missouri v. Dockery	165 (1903)	Holmes	none	none	Mo.	affirmed
Allen v. Pullman's Palace Car Company	171 (1903)	Day	none	none	C.C.M.D. Tenn.	affirmed
Defiance Water Company v. City of Defiance	184 (1903)	Fuller	none	none	C.C.N.D. Ohio	reversed
Warner v. Searle and Hereth Company	195 (1903)	Fuller	none	none	7th Cir.	affirmed
Atkin v. Kansas	207 (1903)	Harlan	none	none	Kan.	affirmed
Louisville Trust Company v. Knott	225 (1903)	Harlan	none	none	C.C.W.D. Ky.	dismissed
Gertgens v. O'Connor	237 (1903)	Brewer	none	none	Minn.	affirmed
Mosheuvel v. District of Columbia	247 (1903)	White	none	none	D.C. Cir.	reversed
McLoughlin v. Raphael Tuck and Sons Company	267 (1903)	White	none	none	2d Cir.	affirmed
People's National Bank v. Marye	272 (1903)	Peckham	none	none	C.C.E.D. Va.	affirmed
Cable v. United States Life Insurance Company	288 (1903)	Peckham	none	none	7th Cir.	reversed
Hibben v. Smith	310 (1903)	Peckham	none	none	Ind.	affirmed
Choctaw, Oklahoma and Gulf Railroad Company v. Tennessee	326 (1903)	Peckham	none	none	8th Cir.	affirmed
Choctaw, Oklahoma and Gulf Railroad Company v. Holloway	334 (1903)	Peckham	none	none	8th Cir.	affirmed
Sharp v. United States	341 (1903)	Peckham	none	none	3d Cir.	affirmed
City of Owensboro v. Owensboro Waterworks Company	358 (1903)	McKenna	none	none	C.C.W.D. Ky.	reversed
Anglo-American Provision Company v. Davis Provision Company I	373 (1903)	Holmes	none	none	N.Y.	affirmed
Anglo-American Provision Company v. Davis Provision Company II	376 (1903)	Holmes	none	none	C.C.S.D.N.Y.	dismissed
Wisconsin and Michigan Railway Company v. Powers	379 (1903)	Holmes	none	none	C.C.E.D. Mich.	affirmed
Louisiana State Board of Assessors v. Comptoir national d'escompte de Paris	388 (1903)	Day	none	none	C.C.E.D. La.	reversed
Arbuckle v. Blackburn	405 (1903)	Fuller	none	none	6th Cir.	dismissed
Guaranty Company v. Pressed Brick Company	416 (1903)	Brown	none	none	8th Cir.	certification
French Republic v. Saratoga Vichy Spring Co.	427 (1903)	Brown	none	none	2d Cir.	affirmed
A foreign government cannot invoke the rule of nullum tempus to answer a defense of laches, where the government's interest is merely nominal; A geographic mark that has become generic and is not used in a misleading manner by subsequent parties will not support injunction.
Norfolk and Western Railway Company v. Sims	441 (1903)	Brown	none	none	N.C.	reversed
Schuyler National Bank v. Gadsden	451 (1903)	White	none	Brown	Neb.	reversed
Baltimore and Potomac Railroad Company v. Landrigan	461 (1903)	McKenna	none	none	D.C. Cir.	affirmed
Pennsylvania Railroad Company v. Hughes	477 (1903)	Day	none	none	Pa.	affirmed
Beasley v. Texas Pacific Railroad Company	492 (1903)	Holmes	none	none	5th Cir.	affirmed
Deposit Bank v. City of Frankfort	499 (1903)	Day	none	Fuller	Ky.	reversed
Spencer v. Duplan Silk Company	526 (1903)	Fuller	none	none	3d Cir.	dismissed
Toltec Ranch Company v. Cook	532 (1903)	McKenna	none	none	Utah	affirmed
Toltec Ranch Company v. Babcock	542 (1903)	McKenna	none	none	Utah	affirmed
White v. United States	545 (1903)	Day	none	none	Ct. Cl.	affirmed
Northern Securities Company v. United States	555 (1903)	Fuller	none	none	C.C.D. Minn.	amicus filing denied

== See also ==
- Certificate of division
