= Choctaw and Chickasaw Citizenship Court =

United States federal court (1902–1903)

The Choctaw and Chickasaw Citizenship Court was a short-lived United States federal court which existed between 1902 and 1903.

== History ==
=== Background ===
Beginning with the Dawes Act of 1887, Congress passed several laws designed to divide and allocate land between members of the Cherokee, Chickasaw, Choctaw, Creek and Seminole tribes in the Indian Territory (modern-day Oklahoma). As part of this scheme, subsequent legislation authorized a “Commission to the Five Civilized Tribes,” commonly known as the Dawes Commission, to determine the citizenship of Native Americans claiming membership in these tribes. Unsuccessful applicants were entitled to appeal to the United States Court for the Indian Territory.

The Choctaw and Chickasaw nations objected to the admission on appeal of several individuals without notice to them. In response, Congress reached an agreement with the nations promulgated on July 1, 1902 (32 Stat. 641), whereby it created a new court known as the Choctaw and Chickasaw Citizenship Court. As part of this agreement, Congress authorized the tribes to initiate a suit, with ten named defendants standing for the class of individuals admitted as citizens without notice, and gave the court appellate jurisdiction over the United States Court in the Indian Territory for the purposes of these citizenship determinations.

=== Composition and mandate ===
The court was staffed by a Chief Judge and two associate judges, each of whom was appointed by the President of the United States by and with the advice and consent of the Senate. Because the court’s jurisdiction was limited to the issue of citizenship admission of individuals appealing from the Dawes Commission’s initial decision, the agreement stipulated that the court would terminate upon final determination of that question, but no later than December 31, 1903.

The court's Chief Judge was Spencer B. Adams of North Carolina, and its associate judges were Walter L. Weaver of Ohio and Henry S. Foote of California.

=== Dissolution ===
The court reached a final judgment in the test case and certified its decision to the Dawes Commission on January 15, 1903. A later 1903 Supreme Court opinion denied an attempt to challenge the court’s authority via a writ of prohibition because the court itself had ceased to exist on termination of the case. The court is thus unusual in the history of the judiciary for deciding a single matter and for existing for less than seven months.
