= List of United States Supreme Court cases, volume 123 =

Supreme Court of the United States
- Interactive map of Supreme Court of the United States
- 38°53′26″N 77°00′16″W
- Established: March 4, 1789; 236 years ago
- Location: Washington, D.C.
- Coordinates: 38°53′26″N 77°00′16″W
- Composition method: Presidential nomination with Senate confirmation
- Authorised by: Constitution of the United States, Art. III, § 1
- Judge term length: life tenure, subject to impeachment and removal
- Number of positions: 9 (by statute)
- Website: supremecourt.gov

This is a list of cases reported in volume 123 of United States Reports, decided by the Supreme Court of the United States in 1887.

== Justices of the Supreme Court at the time of volume 123 U.S. ==
The Supreme Court is established by Article III, Section 1 of the Constitution of the United States, which says: "The judicial Power of the United States, shall be vested in one supreme Court . . .". The size of the Court is not specified; the Constitution leaves it to Congress to set the number of justices. Under the Judiciary Act of 1789 Congress originally fixed the number of justices at six (one chief justice and five associate justices). Since 1789 Congress has varied the size of the Court from six to seven, nine, ten, and back to nine justices (always including one chief justice).

After the death of Justice William Burnham Woods in May 1887, when the cases in volume 123 U.S. were decided the Court comprised the following eight members:

Portrait	Justice	Office	Home State	Succeeded	Date confirmed by the Senate (Vote)	Tenure on Supreme Court
	Morrison Waite	Chief Justice	Ohio	Salmon P. Chase	January 21, 1874 (63–0)	March 4, 1874 – March 23, 1888 (Died)
	Samuel Freeman Miller	Associate Justice	Iowa	Peter Vivian Daniel	July 16, 1862 (Acclamation)	July 21, 1862 – October 13, 1890 (Died)
	Stephen Johnson Field	Associate Justice	California	newly created seat	March 10, 1863 (Acclamation)	May 10, 1863 – December 1, 1897 (Retired)
	Joseph P. Bradley	Associate Justice	New Jersey	newly created seat	March 21, 1870 (46–9)	March 23, 1870 – January 22, 1892 (Died)
	John Marshall Harlan	Associate Justice	Kentucky	David Davis	November 29, 1877 (Acclamation)	December 10, 1877 – October 14, 1911 (Died)
	Stanley Matthews	Associate Justice	Ohio	Noah Haynes Swayne	May 12, 1881 (24–23)	May 17, 1881 – March 22, 1889 (Died)
	Horace Gray	Associate Justice	Massachusetts	Nathan Clifford	December 20, 1881 (51–5)	January 9, 1882 – September 15, 1902 (Died)
	Samuel Blatchford	Associate Justice	New York	Ward Hunt	March 22, 1882 (Acclamation)	April 3, 1882 – July 7, 1893 (Died)

== Notable Case in 123 U.S. ==
=== Mugler v. Kansas ===
In Mugler v. Kansas, 123 U.S. 623 (1887), the Supreme Court held that state law prohibiting the manufacture of intoxicating liquor does not infringe on a right or privilege secured by the federal Constitution. The Court, however, decided that it had the power to inquire into the intentions behind regulations to determine the connection between the regulations and the state's police power.

== Citation style ==
Under the Judiciary Act of 1789 the federal court structure at the time comprised District Courts, which had general trial jurisdiction; Circuit Courts, which had mixed trial and appellate (from the US District Courts) jurisdiction; and the United States Supreme Court, which had appellate jurisdiction over the federal District and Circuit courts—and for certain issues over state courts. The Supreme Court also had limited original jurisdiction (i.e., in which cases could be filed directly with the Supreme Court without first having been heard by a lower federal or state court). There were one or more federal District Courts and/or Circuit Courts in each state, territory, or other geographical region.

Bluebook citation style is used for case names, citations, and jurisdictions.

- "C.C.D." = United States Circuit Court for the District of . . .
  - e.g.,"C.C.D.N.J." = United States Circuit Court for the District of New Jersey
- "D." = United States District Court for the District of . . .
  - e.g.,"D. Mass." = United States District Court for the District of Massachusetts
- "E." = Eastern; "M." = Middle; "N." = Northern; "S." = Southern; "W." = Western
  - e.g.,"C.C.S.D.N.Y." = United States Circuit Court for the Southern District of New York
  - e.g.,"M.D. Ala." = United States District Court for the Middle District of Alabama
- "Ct. Cl." = United States Court of Claims
- The abbreviation of a state's name alone indicates the highest appellate court in that state's judiciary at the time.
  - e.g.,"Pa." = Supreme Court of Pennsylvania
  - e.g.,"Me." = Supreme Judicial Court of Maine

== List of cases in volume 123 U.S. ==
Case Name	Page and year	Opinion of the Court	Concurring opinion(s)	Dissenting opinion(s)	Lower court	Disposition
Coffee v. Groover	1 (1887)	Bradley	none	none	Fla.	reversed
United States v. Louisiana	32 (1887)	Field	none	none	Ct. Cl.	affirmed
United States v. Alabama	39 (1887)	Field	none	none	Ct. Cl.	affirmed
The Excelsior	40 (1887)	Blatchford	none	none	C.C.E.D. Va.	affirmed
Burlington, Cedar Rapids and Northern Railway Company v. Simmons	52 (1887)	Waite	none	none	C.C.S.D. Iowa	dismissed
Morey v. Lockhart	56 (1887)	Waite	none	none	C.C.E.D. La.	dismissed
Gilson v. Town of Dayton	59 (1887)	Waite	none	none	C.C.N.D. Ill.	affirmed
Henderson v. Louisville and Nashville Railroad Company	61 (1887)	Gray	none	none	C.C.E.D. La.	affirmed
Sun Mutual Insurance Company v. Kountz Transportation Company	65 (1887)	Harlan	none	none	C.C.E.D. La.	rehearing denied
Orient Mutual Insurance Company v. Adams	67 (1887)	Harlan	none	none	C.C.W.D. Pa.	affirmed
Tufts v. Tufts	76 (1887)	Waite	none	none	Sup. Ct. Terr. Utah	affirmed
Davis v. Key	79 (1887)	Blatchford	none	none	Sup. Ct. D.C.	affirmed
Davenport National Bank v. Board of Equalization	83 (1887)	Miller	none	none	Iowa	affirmed
Parker and Whipple Company v. Yale Clock Company	87 (1887)	Blatchford	none	none	C.C.D. Conn.	affirmed
Bull v. Bank of Kasson	105 (1887)	Field	none	none	C.C.D. Minn.	reversed
United States v. Philadelphia and Reading Railroad Company	113 (1887)	Gray	none	none	C.C.E.D. Pa.	affirmed
Coan v. Flagg	117 (1887)	Matthews	none	none	Ohio	affirmed
Spies v. Illinois	131 (1887)	Waite	none	none	Ill.	dismissed
Mathews v. United States	182 (1887)	Harlan	none	none	Ct. Cl.	affirmed
United States v. Mullan	186 (1887)	Blatchford	none	none	Ct. Cl.	affirmed
Craig v. Leitensdorfer	189 (1887)	Matthews	none	none	C.C.D. Colo.	reversed
Missouri ex rel. Harshman v. Winterbottom	215 (1887)	Miller	none	none	C.C.E.D. Mo.	affirmed
Hoard v. Chesapeake and Ohio Railway Company	222 (1887)	Miller	none	none	C.C.D.W. Va.	affirmed
Finn v. United States	227 (1887)	Harlan	none	none	Ct. Cl.	affirmed
Richter v. Jerome	233 (1887)	Waite	none	none	C.C.W.D. Mich.	affirmed
Smith and Griggs Manufacturing Company v. Sprague	249 (1887)	Matthews	none	none	C.C.D. Conn.	reversed
Andrews v. Hovey	267 (1887)	Blatchford	none	none	C.C.S.D. Iowa	affirmed
Siemens's Administrator v. Sellers	276 (1887)	Bradley	none	none	C.C.E.D. Pa.	affirmed
Wilkinson v. Nebraska ex rel. Cleveland Society	286 (1887)	Waite	none	none	C.C.D. Neb.	dismissed
Sands v. Manistee River Improvement Company	288 (1887)	Field	none	none	Mich.	affirmed
Ruggles v. Manistee River Improvement Company	297 (1887)	Field	none	none	Mich.	affirmed
Hitz v. Jenks	297 (1887)	Gray	none	none	Sup. Ct. D.C.	affirmed
Colorado Coal and Iron Company v. United States	307 (1887)	Matthews	none	none	C.C.D. Colo.	reversed
Dewey v. West Fairmont Gas Coal Company	329 (1887)	Matthews	none	none	C.C.D.W. Va.	affirmed
United States v. Morant	335 (1887)	Bradley	none	none	N.D. Fla.	affirmed
United States v. Allen	345 (1887)	Harlan	none	none	Ct. Cl.	reversed
The Maggie J. Smith	349 (1887)	Field	none	none	C.C.D. Md.	affirmed
Oelbermann and Company v. Merritt	356 (1887)	Blatchford	none	none	C.C.S.D.N.Y.	reversed
Mustin and Company v. Cadwalader	369 (1887)	Blatchford	none	none	C.C.E.D. Pa.	reversed
In re Henry	372 (1887)	Waite	none	none	W.D.S.C.	dismissed
Cox v. Western Land and Cattle Company	375 (1887)	Waite	none	none	C.C.N.D. Ill.	dismissed
Lamaster v. Keeler	376 (1887)	Field	none	none	C.C.D. Neb.	reversed
White v. Barber	392 (1887)	Blatchford	none	none	C.C.N.D. Ill.	affirmed
Jewell and Sons v. Knight	426 (1887)	Gray	none	none	C.C.D. Ind.	dismissed
Smith v. Craft	436 (1887)	Gray	none	none	C.C.D. Ind.	dismissed
In re Ayers	443 (1887)	Matthews	Field	Harlan	C.C.E.D. Va.	reversed
Spraul v. Louisiana	516 (1887)	Waite	none	none	La.	show cause denied
Benites v. Hampton	519 (1887)	Waite	none	none	Sup. Ct. Terr. Utah	dismissed
Le Sassier v. Kennedy	521 (1887)	Waite	none	none	La.	dismissed
New York, Lake Erie and Western Railroad Company v. Madison	524 (1887)	Waite	none	none	C.C.N.D. Ohio	affirmed
Stryker v. Goodnow's Administrator	527 (1887)	Waite	none	none	Iowa	affirmed
Chapman v. Goodnow's Administrator	540 (1887)	Waite	none	none	Iowa	affirmed
Litchfield v. Goodnow's Administrator	549 (1887)	Waite	none	none	Iowa	affirmed
Des Moines Navigation and Railroad Company v. Iowa Homestead Company	552 (1887)	Waite	none	none	Iowa	reversed
Plumb v. Goodnow's Administrator	560 (1887)	Waite	none	none	Iowa	reversed
Lacombe v. E.J. Forstall's Sons	562 (1887)	Miller	none	none	C.C.E.D. La.	affirmed
J. Teal and Company v. Bilby	572 (1887)	Miller	none	none	C.C.W.D. Mo.	affirmed
Hailes v. Albany Stove Company	582 (1887)	Bradley	none	none	C.C.N.D.N.Y.	affirmed
Crawford v. Heysinger	589 (1887)	Blatchford	none	none	C.C.E.D. Pa.	reversed
Wilson v. Riddle	608 (1887)	Blatchford	none	none	C.C.S.D. Ga.	affirmed
L. Zeckendorf and Company v. Johnson	617 (1887)	Waite	none	none	Sup. Ct. Terr. Ariz.	affirmed
Bond v. Davenport	619 (1887)	Waite	none	none	C.C.S.D. Iowa	reversed
Mugler v. Kansas	623 (1887)	Harlan	none	Field	Kan.; C.C.D. Kan.	multiple
Sherman v. Grinnell	679 (1887)	Waite	none	none	C.C.S.D.N.Y.	dismissed
United States v. Hill	681 (1887)	Waite	none	none	C.C.D. Mass.	dismissed
Texas and Pacific Railway Company v. Marlor	687 (1887)	Blatchford	none	none	C.C.S.D.N.Y.	affirmed
Robison v. Female Orphan Asylum	702 (1887)	Matthews	none	none	C.C.D. Me.	affirmed
Northern Pacific Railway Company v. Mares	710 (1887)	Matthews	none	none	Sup. Ct. Terr. Dakota	affirmed
Marquette, Houghton and Ontonagon Railroad Company v. United States	722 (1887)	Waite	none	none	C.C.W.D. Mich.	reversed
Radford v. Folsom	725 (1887)	Waite	none	none	C.C.S.D. Iowa	dismissed
North Pennsylvania Railroad Company v. Commercial National Bank	727 (1887)	Field	none	none	C.C.E.D. Pa.	affirmed
Aetna Life Insurance Company v. Davey	739 (1887)	Harlan	none	none	C.C.D.N.J.	reversed
Talkington v. Dumbleton	745 (1887)	Waite	none	none	C.C.D. Or.	dismissed
Hefner v. Northwestern Mutual Life Insurance Company	747 (1887)	Gray	none	none	C.C.S.D. Iowa	affirmed
