= List of United States Supreme Court cases, volume 165 =

Supreme Court of the United States
- Interactive map of Supreme Court of the United States
- 38°53′26″N 77°00′16″W
- Established: March 4, 1789; 236 years ago
- Location: Washington, D.C.
- Coordinates: 38°53′26″N 77°00′16″W
- Composition method: Presidential nomination with Senate confirmation
- Authorised by: Constitution of the United States, Art. III, § 1
- Judge term length: life tenure, subject to impeachment and removal
- Number of positions: 9 (by statute)
- Website: supremecourt.gov

This is a list of cases reported in volume 165 of United States Reports, decided by the Supreme Court of the United States in 1897.

== Justices of the Supreme Court at the time of volume 165 U.S. ==
The Supreme Court is established by Article III, Section 1 of the Constitution of the United States, which says: "The judicial Power of the United States, shall be vested in one supreme Court . . .". The size of the Court is not specified; the Constitution leaves it to Congress to set the number of justices. Under the Judiciary Act of 1789 Congress originally fixed the number of justices at six (one chief justice and five associate justices). Since 1789 Congress has varied the size of the Court from six to seven, nine, ten, and back to nine justices (always including one chief justice).

When the cases in volume 165 were decided the Court comprised the following nine members:

Portrait	Justice	Office	Home State	Succeeded	Date confirmed by the Senate (Vote)	Tenure on Supreme Court
	Melville Fuller	Chief Justice	Illinois	Morrison Waite	July 20, 1888 (41–20)	October 8, 1888 – July 4, 1910 (Died)
	Stephen Johnson Field	Associate Justice	California	newly created seat	March 10, 1863 (Acclamation)	May 10, 1863 – December 1, 1897 (Retired)
	John Marshall Harlan	Associate Justice	Kentucky	David Davis	November 29, 1877 (Acclamation)	December 10, 1877 – October 14, 1911 (Died)
	Horace Gray	Associate Justice	Massachusetts	Nathan Clifford	December 20, 1881 (51–5)	January 9, 1882 – September 15, 1902 (Died)
	David Josiah Brewer	Associate Justice	Kansas	Stanley Matthews	December 18, 1889 (53–11)	January 6, 1890 – March 28, 1910 (Died)
	Henry Billings Brown	Associate Justice	Michigan	Samuel Freeman Miller	December 29, 1890 (Acclamation)	January 5, 1891 – May 28, 1906 (Retired)
	George Shiras Jr.	Associate Justice	Pennsylvania	Joseph P. Bradley	July 26, 1892 (Acclamation)	October 10, 1892 – February 23, 1903 (Retired)
	Edward Douglass White	Associate Justice	Louisiana	Samuel Blatchford	February 19, 1894 (Acclamation)	March 12, 1894 – December 18, 1910 (Continued as chief justice)
	Rufus W. Peckham	Associate Justice	New York	Howell Edmunds Jackson	December 9, 1895 (Acclamation)	January 6, 1896 – October 24, 1909 (Died)

== Notable Case in 165 U.S. ==
=== Allgeyer v. Louisiana ===
Allgeyer v. Louisiana, 165 U.S. 578 (1897), was a landmark decision in which the Supreme Court struck down a Louisiana statute for violating an individual's liberty of contract. It was the first case in which the Court interpreted the word liberty in the Due Process Clause of the Fourteenth Amendment to mean "economic liberty". The decision was the beginning of the Lochner era during which the Supreme Court struck many state regulations for infringing on an individual's right to contract. The Lochner era lasted 40 years and ended with West Coast Hotel Co. v. Parrish in 1937.

== Citation style ==
Under the Judiciary Act of 1789 the federal court structure at the time comprised District Courts, which had general trial jurisdiction; Circuit Courts, which had mixed trial and appellate (from the US District Courts) jurisdiction; and the United States Supreme Court, which had appellate jurisdiction over the federal District and Circuit courts—and for certain issues over state courts. The Supreme Court also had limited original jurisdiction (i.e., in which cases could be filed directly with the Supreme Court without first having been heard by a lower federal or state court). There were one or more federal District Courts and/or Circuit Courts in each state, territory, or other geographical region.

The Judiciary Act of 1891 created the United States Courts of Appeals and reassigned the jurisdiction of most routine appeals from the district and circuit courts to these appellate courts. The Act created nine new courts that were originally known as the "United States Circuit Courts of Appeals." The new courts had jurisdiction over most appeals of lower court decisions. The Supreme Court could review either legal issues that a court of appeals certified or decisions of court of appeals by writ of certiorari.

Bluebook citation style is used for case names, citations, and jurisdictions.

- "# Cir." = United States Court of Appeals
  - e.g., "3d Cir." = United States Court of Appeals for the Third Circuit
- "C.C.D." = United States Circuit Court for the District of . . .
  - e.g.,"C.C.D.N.J." = United States Circuit Court for the District of New Jersey
- "D." = United States District Court for the District of . . .
  - e.g.,"D. Mass." = United States District Court for the District of Massachusetts
- "E." = Eastern; "M." = Middle; "N." = Northern; "S." = Southern; "W." = Western
  - e.g.,"C.C.S.D.N.Y." = United States Circuit Court for the Southern District of New York
  - e.g.,"M.D. Ala." = United States District Court for the Middle District of Alabama
- "Ct. Cl." = United States Court of Claims
- The abbreviation of a state's name alone indicates the highest appellate court in that state's judiciary at the time.
  - e.g.,"Pa." = Supreme Court of Pennsylvania
  - e.g.,"Me." = Supreme Judicial Court of Maine

== List of cases in volume 165 U.S. ==
Case Name	Page and year	Opinion of the Court	Concurring opinion(s)	Dissenting opinion(s)	Lower Court	Disposition
St. Louis–San Francisco Railway Company v. Mathews	1 (1897)	Gray	none	none	Mo.	affirmed
Missouri Pacific Railroad Company v. Simmons	27 (1897)	Gray	none	none	Mo.	affirmed
Warner Valley Stock Company v. Smith	28 (1897)	Gray	none	none	D.C. Cir.	reversed
Agnew v. United States	36 (1897)	Fuller	none	none	C.C.S.D. Fla.	affirmed
Scott v. Donald I	58 (1897)	Shiras	none	Brown	C.C.D.S.C.	affirmed
Scott v. Donald II	107 (1897)	Shiras	none	none	C.C.D.S.C.	affirmed
Missouri v. Iowa	118 (1897)	Fuller	none	none	original	boundary set
Hussman v. Durham	144 (1897)	Brewer	none	none	Iowa	affirmed
Gulf, Colorado and Santa Fe Railway Company v. Ellis	150 (1897)	Brewer	none	Gray	Tex.	reversed
Clarke v. McDade	168 (1897)	Peckham	none	none	Cal. Super. Ct.	dismissed
United States v. Barnette	174 (1897)	Gray	none	none	Ct. Cl.	affirmed
Jones v. Brim	180 (1897)	White	none	none	Sup. Ct. Terr. Utah	affirmed
Addington v. United States	184 (1897)	Harlan	none	none	C.C.E.D. Tex.	affirmed
Egan v. Hart	188 (1897)	White	none	none	La.	dismissed
Adams Express Company v. Ohio	194 (1897)	Fuller	none	White	6th Cir.	affirmed
American Express Company v. Indiana	255 (1897)	Fuller	none	White	Ind. Cir. Ct.	affirmed
Rosecrans v. United States	257 (1897)	Brewer	none	none	C.C.D. Mont.	affirmed
The Valencia	264 (1897)	Harlan	none	none	2d Cir.	certification
Pim v. City of St. Louis	273 (1897)	Harlan	none	none	Mo.	dismissed
Robertson v. Baldwin	275 (1897)	Brown	none	Harlan	C.C.N.D. Cal.	affirmed
Western Union Telegraph Company v. Indiana	304 (1897)	Fuller	none	none	Ind.	affirmed
Price v. United States	311 (1897)	Peckham	none	none	C.C.N.D. Cal.	affirmed
United States v. Gorham	316 (1897)	Peckham	none	none	Ct. Cl.	affirmed
Graves v. United States	323 (1897)	Peckham	none	none	C.C.N.D. Iowa	reversed
District of Columbia v. Johnson	330 (1897)	Peckham	none	none	Ct. Cl.	reversed
District of Columbia v. Hall	340 (1897)	Peckham	none	none	D.C. Cir.	reversed
District of Columbia v. Dickson	341 (1897)	Peckham	none	none	Ct. Cl.	reversed
Hopkins v. Grimshaw	342 (1897)	Gray	none	none	Sup. Ct. D.C.	reversed
Robinson v. Caldwell	359 (1897)	Harlan	none	none	C.C.D. Idaho	dismissed
Oakes v. Mase	363 (1897)	White	none	none	8th Cir.	reversed
Lake Shore and Michigan Southern Railway Company v. Ohio	365 (1897)	White	none	none	Ohio	affirmed
Burlington Gaslight Company v. Burlington, Cedar Rapids and Northern Railway Company	370 (1897)	Brewer	none	none	Iowa	affirmed
Davis v. United States	373 (1897)	Brewer	none	none	C.C.W.D. Ark.	affirmed
Germania Iron Company v. United States	379 (1897)	Brewer	none	none	8th Cir.	affirmed
Deweese v. Reinhard	386 (1897)	Brewer	none	none	8th Cir.	affirmed
Glover v. Patten	394 (1897)	Brown	none	none	D.C. Cir.	affirmed
Atlantic and Pacific Railroad Company v. Mingus	413 (1897)	Brown	none	none	Sup. Ct. Terr. N.M.	affirmed
In re Chetwood	443 (1897)	Fuller	none	none	C.C.N.D. Cal.	certiorari granted
United States v. Winona and St. Peter Railroad Company	463 (1897)	Brewer	none	none	8th Cir.	affirmed
United States v. Union Pacific Railroad Company	482 (1897)	Brewer	none	none	8th Cir.	affirmed
Winona and St. Peter Railroad Company v. United States	483 (1897)	Brewer	none	none	8th Cir.	affirmed
Dunlop v. United States	486 (1897)	Brown	none	none	C.C.N.D. Ill.	affirmed
United States v. McMillan	504 (1897)	Gray	none	none	Sup. Ct. Terr. Utah	reversed
Smith v. Vulcan Iron Works	518 (1897)	Gray	none	none	9th Cir.	dismissed
In re Kollock	526 (1897)	Fuller	none	none	D.C. Cir.	habeas corpus denied
McCormick v. Market National Bank	538 (1897)	Gray	none	none	Ill.	affirmed
Swaim v. United States	553 (1897)	Shiras	none	none	Ct. Cl.	affirmed
De Vaughn v. Hutchinson	566 (1897)	Shiras	none	none	D.C. Cir.	affirmed
Allgeyer v. Louisiana	578 (1897)	Peckham	none	none	La.	reversed
Walker v. New Mexico and Southern Pacific Railroad Company	593 (1897)	Brewer	none	none	Sup. Ct. Terr. N.M.	affirmed
Pauly v. State Loan and Trust Company	606 (1897)	Harlan	none	none	9th Cir.	affirmed
Wade v. Lawder	624 (1897)	Fuller	none	none	Mo.	dismissed
New York, New Haven and Hartford Railroad Company v. New York	628 (1897)	Harlan	none	none	N.Y. Sup. Ct.	affirmed
Fourth St. National Bank v. Yardley	634 (1897)	White	none	none	3d Cir.	certification
Walker v. Brown	654 (1897)	White	none	none	8th Cir.	reversed
United States v. City of Santa Fe	675 (1897)	White	none	none	Ct. Priv. Land Cl.	reversed

== See also ==
- Certificate of division
