= List of United States Supreme Court cases, volume 198 =

Supreme Court of the United States
- Interactive map of Supreme Court of the United States
- 38°53′26″N 77°00′16″W
- Established: March 4, 1789; 237 years ago
- Location: Washington, D.C.
- Coordinates: 38°53′26″N 77°00′16″W
- Composition method: Presidential nomination with Senate confirmation
- Authorised by: Constitution of the United States, Art. III, § 1
- Judge term length: life tenure, subject to impeachment and removal
- Number of positions: 9 (by statute)
- Website: supremecourt.gov

This is a list of cases reported in volume 198 of United States Reports, decided by the Supreme Court of the United States in 1905.

== Justices of the Supreme Court at the time of volume 198 U.S. ==
The Supreme Court is established by Article III, Section 1 of the Constitution of the United States, which says: "The judicial Power of the United States, shall be vested in one supreme Court . . .". The size of the Court is not specified; the Constitution leaves it to Congress to set the number of justices. Under the Judiciary Act of 1789 Congress originally fixed the number of justices at six (one chief justice and five associate justices). Since 1789 Congress has varied the size of the Court from six to seven, nine, ten, and back to nine justices (always including one chief justice).

When the cases in volume 198 were decided the Court comprised the following nine members:

Portrait	Justice	Office	Home State	Succeeded	Date confirmed by the Senate (Vote)	Tenure on Supreme Court
	Melville Fuller	Chief Justice	Illinois	Morrison Waite	July 20, 1888 (41–20)	October 8, 1888 – July 4, 1910 (Died)
	John Marshall Harlan	Associate Justice	Kentucky	David Davis	November 29, 1877 (Acclamation)	December 10, 1877 – October 14, 1911 (Died)
	David Josiah Brewer	Associate Justice	Kansas	Stanley Matthews	December 18, 1889 (53–11)	January 6, 1890 – March 28, 1910 (Died)
	Henry Billings Brown	Associate Justice	Michigan	Samuel Freeman Miller	December 29, 1890 (Acclamation)	January 5, 1891 – May 28, 1906 (Retired)
	Edward Douglass White	Associate Justice	Louisiana	Samuel Blatchford	February 19, 1894 (Acclamation)	March 12, 1894 – December 18, 1910 (Continued as chief justice)
	Rufus W. Peckham	Associate Justice	New York	Howell Edmunds Jackson	December 9, 1895 (Acclamation)	January 6, 1896 – October 24, 1909 (Died)
	Joseph McKenna	Associate Justice	California	Stephen Johnson Field	January 21, 1898 (Acclamation)	January 26, 1898 – January 5, 1925 (Retired)
	Oliver Wendell Holmes Jr.	Associate Justice	Massachusetts	Horace Gray	December 4, 1902 (Acclamation)	December 8, 1902 – January 12, 1932 (Retired)
	William R. Day	Associate Justice	Ohio	George Shiras Jr.	February 23, 1903 (Acclamation)	March 2, 1903 – November 13, 1922 (Retired)

== Notable Cases in 198 U.S. ==
=== Lochner v. New York ===
Lochner v. New York, 198 U.S. 45 (1905), is a landmark decision in which the Supreme Court ruled that a New York state law setting maximum working hours for bakers violated the bakers' right to freedom of contract under the Fourteenth Amendment to the U.S. Constitution. The underlying case began in 1899 when Joseph Lochner, a German immigrant who owned a bakery in Utica, New York, was charged with violating New York's Bakeshop Act of 1895. The Bakeshop Act had made it a crime for New York bakeries to employ bakers for more than 10 hours per day or 60 hours per week. He was convicted and ultimately appealed to the U.S. Supreme Court. A majority of the Supreme Court held that the law violated the due process clause, stating that the law constituted an "unreasonable, unnecessary and arbitrary interference with the right and liberty of the individual to contract". Four dissenting justices rejected that view, and the dissent of Justice Oliver Wendell Holmes Jr., in particular, became one of the most famous opinions in US legal history. Holmes wrote:

"[A] constitution is not intended to embody a particular economic theory, whether of paternalism and the organic relation of the citizen to the State or of laissez faire. It is made for people of fundamentally differing views, and the accident of our finding certain opinions natural and familiar or novel and even shocking ought not to conclude our judgment upon the question whether statutes embodying them conflict with the Constitution of the United States. General propositions do not decide concrete cases". (198 U.S. 75-76)

=== United States v. Ju Toy ===
In United States v. Ju Toy, 198 U.S. 253 (1905), the Supreme Court held that a citizen of the United States could be barred entry into the country based solely on an administrative decision, without routine recourse to the courts even on the factual question of citizenship. The Court determined that refusing entry at a port does not deny due process, and held that findings by immigration officials are conclusive and not subject to judicial review unless there is evidence of bias or negligence. This case marked a shift in the Court in respect to habeas corpus petitions and altered the judicial landscape for citizens applying for admission into the United States as well as for those facing deportation. The Court came to a different conclusion in 1922, that habeas corpus petitioners are entitled to a de novo judicial hearing to determine whether they are U.S. citizens (Ng Fung Ho v. White).

== Citation style ==
Under the Judiciary Act of 1789 the federal court structure at the time comprised District Courts, which had general trial jurisdiction; Circuit Courts, which had mixed trial and appellate (from the US District Courts) jurisdiction; and the United States Supreme Court, which had appellate jurisdiction over the federal District and Circuit courts—and for certain issues over state courts. The Supreme Court also had limited original jurisdiction (i.e., in which cases could be filed directly with the Supreme Court without first having been heard by a lower federal or state court). There were one or more federal District Courts and/or Circuit Courts in each state, territory, or other geographical region.

The Judiciary Act of 1891 created the United States Courts of Appeals and reassigned the jurisdiction of most routine appeals from the district and circuit courts to these appellate courts. The Act created nine new courts that were originally known as the "United States Circuit Courts of Appeals." The new courts had jurisdiction over most appeals of lower court decisions. The Supreme Court could review either legal issues that a court of appeals certified or decisions of court of appeals by writ of certiorari.

Bluebook citation style is used for case names, citations, and jurisdictions.

- "# Cir." = United States Court of Appeals
  - e.g., "3d Cir." = United States Court of Appeals for the Third Circuit
- "C.C.D." = United States Circuit Court for the District of . . .
  - e.g.,"C.C.D.N.J." = United States Circuit Court for the District of New Jersey
- "D." = United States District Court for the District of . . .
  - e.g.,"D. Mass." = United States District Court for the District of Massachusetts
- "E." = Eastern; "M." = Middle; "N." = Northern; "S." = Southern; "W." = Western
  - e.g.,"C.C.S.D.N.Y." = United States Circuit Court for the Southern District of New York
  - e.g.,"M.D. Ala." = United States District Court for the Middle District of Alabama
- "Ct. Cl." = United States Court of Claims
- The abbreviation of a state's name alone indicates the highest appellate court in that state's judiciary at the time.
  - e.g.,"Pa." = Supreme Court of Pennsylvania
  - e.g.,"Me." = Supreme Judicial Court of Maine

== List of cases in volume 198 U.S. ==
Case Name	Page & year	Opinion of the Court	Concurring opinion(s)	Dissenting opinion(s)	Lower Court	Disposition
Benson v. Henkel	1 (1905)	Brown	Day	none	C.C.S.D.N.Y.	affirmed
Pabst B. Co. v. Crenshaw	17 (1905)	White	none	Brown	C.C.W.D. Mo.	affirmed
Lochner v. New York	45 (1905)	Peckham	none	Harlan; Holmes	Oneida Cnty. Ct.	reversed
Beavers v. Haubert	77 (1905)	McKenna	none	none	E.D.N.Y.	affirmed
Humphrey v. Tatman	91 (1905)	Holmes	none	none	Mass. Super. Ct.	reversed
Remington v. Central P.R.R. Co.	95 (1905)	Holmes	none	none	C.C.N.D.N.Y.	affirmed
City of Covington v. First Nat'l Bank	100 (1905)	Day	none	none	C.C.E.D. Ky.	affirmed
Bonin v. Gulf Co.	115 (1905)	Fuller	none	none	5th Cir.	dismissed
Howe S. Co. v. Wyckoff, S. & B.	118 (1905)	Fuller	none	none	2d Cir.	reversed
Parties have the right to use their names in trade as an individual, a firm, and a corporation, except as cover for unfair competition.
Steigleder v. McQuesten	141 (1905)	Harlan	none	none	C.C.D. Wash.	affirmed
Jaster v. Currie	144 (1905)	Holmes	none	none	Neb.	reversed
Allen v. Arguimbau	149 (1905)	Fuller	none	none	Fla.	dismissed
Rodriguez v. United States	156 (1905)	Harlan	none	none	D.P.R.	affirmed
Dunbar v. Green	166 (1905)	Brown	none	none	Kan.	reversed
In re Glaser	171 (1905)	Fuller	none	none	C.C.E.D.N.Y.	mandamus denied
Schlosser v. Hemphill	173 (1905)	Fuller	none	none	Iowa	dismissed
Wells Co. v. Gastonia C. Mfg. Co.	177 (1905)	Harlan	none	none	4th Cir.	reversed
Riverdale C.M. v. Alabama G. Mfg. Co.	188 (1905)	Brewer	none	none	5th Cir.	affirmed
Holden v. Stratton	202 (1905)	White	none	none	9th Cir.	reversed
Harris v. Balk	215 (1905)	Peckham	none	none	N.C.	reversed
Harley v. United States	229 (1905)	McKenna	none	none	Ct. Cl.	affirmed
Chicago Bd. Trade v. Christie G. & S. Co.	236 (1905)	Holmes	none	none	8th Cir.	multiple
United States v. Ju Toy	253 (1905)	Holmes	none	Brewer	9th Cir.	certification
First Nat'l Bank v. Chicago T. & T. Co.	280 (1905)	Fuller	none	none	7th Cir.	reversed
Empire State et al. Co. v. Hanley	292 (1905)	Fuller	none	none	9th Cir.	dismissed
Old Dominion S.S. Co. v. Virginia	299 (1905)	Brewer	none	none	Va.	affirmed
Thompson v. Darden	310 (1905)	White	none	none	Va.	affirmed
Harding v. Harding	317 (1905)	White	none	none	Cal.	reversed
Delaware et al. R.R. Co. v. Pennsylvania	341 (1905)	Peckham	none	none	Pa.	reversed
Clark v. Nash	361 (1905)	Peckham	none	none	Utah	affirmed
United States v. Winans	371 (1905)	McKenna	none	none	C.C.D. Wash.	reversed
Chicago et al. Ry. Co. v. United States	385 (1905)	McKenna	none	none	Ct. Cl.	affirmed
Birrell v. New York & H.R.R. Co.	390 (1905)	McKenna	none	none	N.Y. Sup. Ct.	reversed
Savannah et al. Ry. v. City of Savannah	392 (1905)	Holmes	none	none	Ga.	affirmed
Cimiotti U. Co. v. American F.R. Co.	399 (1905)	Day	none	none	3d Cir.	affirmed
Leonard v. Vicksburg et al. R.R. Co.	416 (1905)	Fuller	none	none	La.	dismissed
Chicago Bd. Trade v. Hammond E. Co.	424 (1905)	Brown	none	none	C.C.N.D. Ill.	reversed
Lavagnino v. Uhlig	443 (1905)	White	none	none	Utah	affirmed
Cunnius v. Reading Sch. Dist.	458 (1905)	White	none	none	Pa.	affirmed
Kendall v. American A.L. Co.	477 (1905)	Peckham	none	none	C.C.S.D.N.Y.	affirmed
Louisville & N.R.R. Co. v. West C.N.S. Co.	483 (1905)	Peckham	none	none	5th Cir.	reversed
Ah Sin v. Wittman	500 (1905)	McKenna	none	none	Cal. Super. Ct.	affirmed
Knights of Pythias v. Meyer	508 (1905)	McKenna	none	none	N.Y. Sup. Ct.	affirmed
Texas & P. Ry. Co. v. Dashiell	521 (1905)	McKenna	none	none	5th Cir.	affirmed
Union T. Co. v. Wilson	530 (1905)	Holmes	none	none	7th Cir.	certification
Whitney v. Wenman	539 (1905)	Day	none	none	S.D.N.Y.	reversed
Van Reed v. People's Nat'l Bank	554 (1905)	Day	none	none	N.Y.	affirmed
Great et al. Co. v. Harris	561 (1905)	Day	none	none	2d Cir.	affirmed

== See also ==
- Certificate of division
