= List of United States Supreme Court cases by the Chase Court =

Supreme Court of the United States
Chase Court
- Taney Court ← → Waite Court
- December 15, 1864 – May 7, 1873 (8 years, 143 days)
- Seat: Old Senate Chamber; Washington, D.C.
- No. of positions: 10 (1864-1866); 8 (1866-1869); 9 (1869-1873)
- Chase Court decisions

This is a partial chronological list of cases decided by the United States Supreme Court decided during the Chase Court, the tenure of Chief Justice Salmon P. Chase from December 15, 1864 through May 7, 1873.

Case name	Citation	Summary
Ex parte Milligan	71 U.S. 2 (1866)	habeas corpus, military tribunals
Ex parte Garland	71 U.S. 333 (1866)	retroactive civil disability for former Confederate officers
Mississippi v. Johnson	71 U.S. 475 (1867)	power of the Supreme Court to constitutionally issue an injunction directed at the President
Pervear v. Massachusetts	72 U.S. 475 (1866)	upholding harsh penalty for violation of state liquor laws, and declining to apply Eighth Amendment to the states
Crandall v. Nevada	73 U.S. 35 (1868)	Right to travel bars taxation of parties leaving a state
Georgia v. Stanton	73 U.S. 50 (1868)	power of the Court to rule on constitutionality of Reconstruction Acts; parameters of the Court's jurisdiction
United States v. Kirby	74 U.S. 482 (1868)	construction of criminal statutes
Ex parte McCardle	74 U.S. 506 (1868)	congressional power to limit Supreme Court’s appellate jurisdiction
Texas v. White	74 U.S. 700 (1869)	constitutionality of state secession
Ex parte Yerger	75 U.S. 85 (1869)	habeas corpus case that became moot when Yerger was released before the court ruling; therefore not actually heard by the Supreme Court
Paul v. Virginia	75 U.S. 168 (1869)	Privileges & Immunities Clause does not apply to corporations, Commerce Clause does not apply to insurance policies
Hepburn v. Griswold	75 U.S. 603 (1870)	constitutionality of legal tender laws
Baker v. Morton	79 U.S. 150 (1870)	land claims in the Nebraska Territory
United States v. Klein	80 U.S. 128 (1871)	separation of powers
Taylor v. Taintor	83 U.S. 366 (1872)	rights and responsibilities of bail bondsmen
Slaughterhouse Cases	83 U.S. 36 (1873)	freedom of employment
Bradwell v. State of Illinois	83 U.S. 130 (1873)	equal protection, exclusion of women from employment
