= Tarble's Case =

- Supreme Court of the United States

Argued November 4, 1871 Decided March 4, 1872
- Full case name: Tarble's Case
- Citations: 80 U.S. 397 (more) 13 Wall. 397; 20 L. Ed. 597

Case history
- Prior: On writ of error to the Wisconsin Supreme Court

Holding
- A State judge has no jurisdiction to issue a writ of habeas corpus, or to continue proceedings under the writ when issued, for the discharge of a person held under the authority, or claim and color of the authority, of the United States by an officer of that government.

Court membership
- Chief Justice Salmon P. Chase Associate Justices Samuel Nelson · Nathan Clifford; Noah H. Swayne · Samuel F. Miller; David Davis · Stephen J. Field; William Strong · Joseph P. Bradley

Case opinions
- Majority: Field, joined by Nelson, Clifford, Swayne, Miller, Davis, Strong, Bradley
- Dissent: Chase

Laws applied
- U.S. Const. art. VI, cl. 2

Tarble's Case, 80 U.S. (13 Wall.) 397 (1872), was a United States Supreme Court case in which the Court held that a State judge has no jurisdiction to issue a writ of habeas corpus, or to continue proceedings under the writ when issued, for the discharge of a person held by the authority, or claim and color of the authority, of the United States by an officer of that government.

== Background ==
Edward Tarble was being held for desertion from the United States Army by Lieutenant Stone, an Army officer in Wisconsin. Tarble's father filed a writ of habeas corpus on the ground that Tarble was a minor at the time of his enlistment, and that he enlisted without the consent of his father. A state judge of Dane County, Wisconsin issued the writ over the objection of the Army officer and ordered Tarble released on August 12, 1869. Stone appealed the decision to the Wisconsin Supreme Court. The Wisconsin Supreme Court affirmed the decision of the lower court in April 1870, and the United States petitioned for certiorari to the United States Supreme Court.

== Opinion of the Court ==
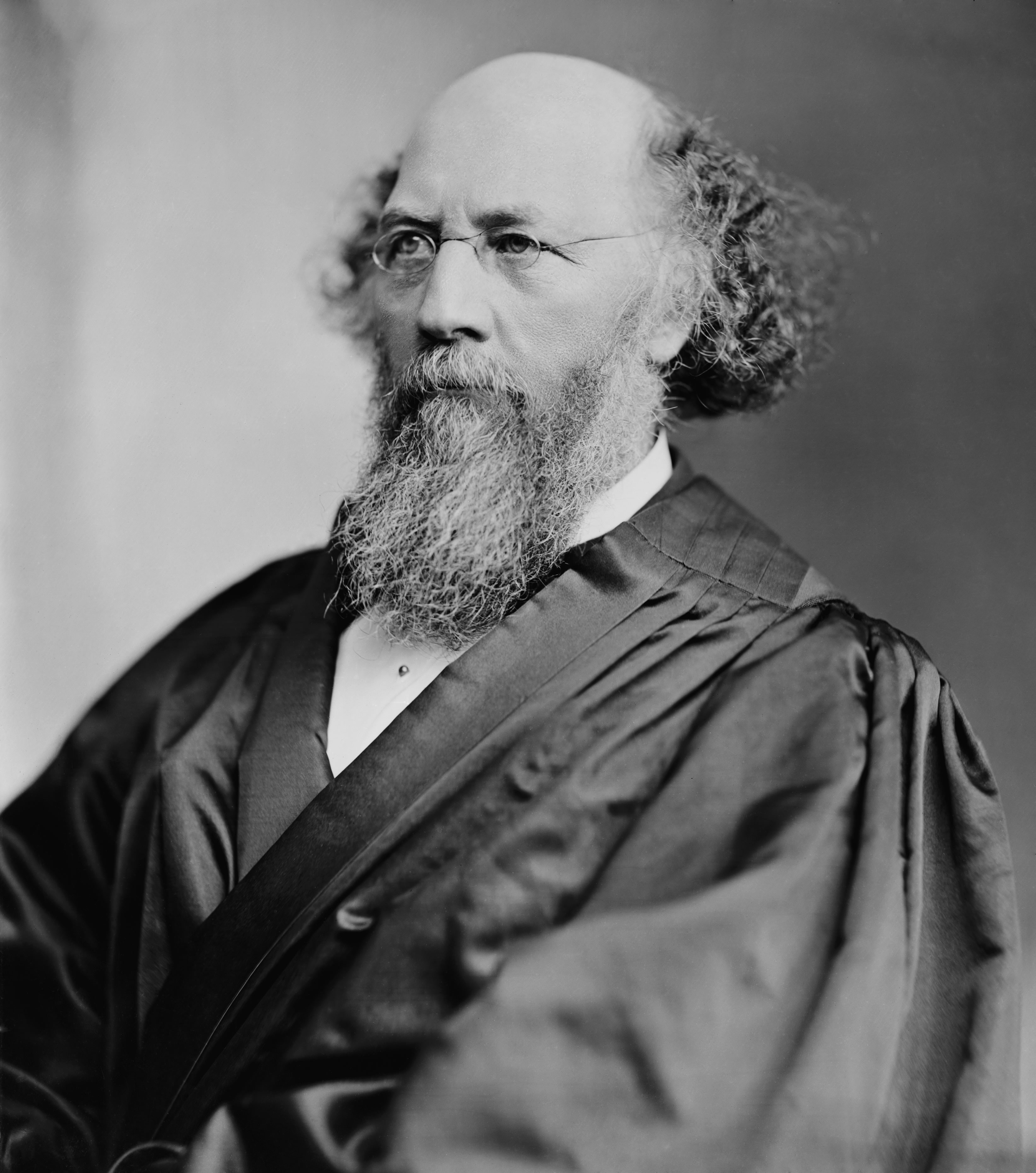
Justice Field, author of the majority opinion

Justice Stephen Field delivered the opinion of the Court. Field stated that both Ableman v. Booth and United States v. Booth had answered the question of jurisdiction. The United States Constitution is the supreme law of the land, "anything in the constitution or laws of any State to the contrary notwithstanding." A state court does not have the jurisdiction "to interfere with the authority of the United States, whether that authority be exercised by a Federal officer or be exercised by a Federal tribunal." A state court may have jurisdiction under state law to issue the writ unless it appears on its face to be directed at an officer of the federal government. The state judge was without jurisdiction to issue the writ and the judgment was reversed.

Chief Justice Salmon P. Chase dissented from the majority opinion. Chase believed that a state court had the authority to issue the writ of habeas corpus, and that to deny that authority denied the rights of citizens to be protected from arbitrary imprisonment.
