= Pennsylvania College Cases =

Trustees of Jefferson College in Canonsburg v. Washington and Jefferson College
- Supreme Court of the United States

Decided December 1, 1871
- Full case name: Trustees of Jefferson College in Canonsburg v. Washington and Jefferson College
- Citations: 80 U.S. 190 (more) 13 Wall. 190; 20 L. Ed. 550; 1871 U.S. LEXIS 1330;

Court membership
- Chief Justice Salmon P. Chase Associate Justices Samuel Nelson · Nathan Clifford; Noah H. Swayne · Samuel F. Miller; David Davis · Stephen J. Field; William Strong · Joseph P. Bradley

Case opinion
- Majority: Clifford, joined by unanimous

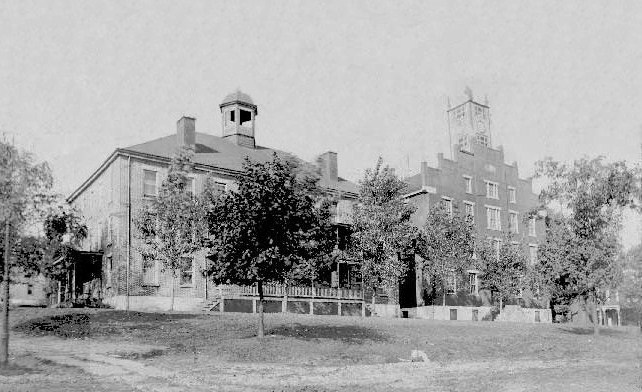
The main buildings at Jefferson College in Canonsburg, Pennsylvania as they appeared ca. 1850

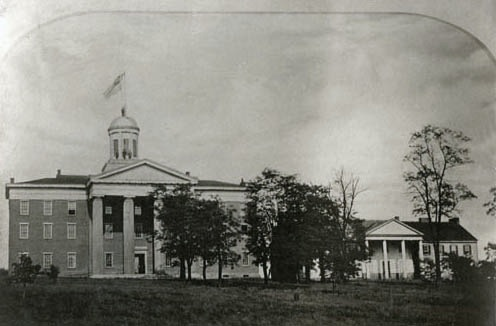
Old Main and McMillan Hall at Washington College in Washington, Pennsylvania as they appeared ca. 1850.
These buildings would be part of the unified Washington & Jefferson College; Old Main would later be adorned with two spires to symbolize the union.

The Pennsylvania College Cases, also known as Trustees of Jefferson College in Canonsburg v. Washington and Jefferson College, was a United States Supreme Court case that was decided in 1871. Justice Nathan Clifford wrote the opinion, ruling in favor of Washington & Jefferson College.

In 1865, two colleges in Washington County, Pennsylvania, Jefferson College in Canonsburg and Washington College in Washington merged to form Washington & Jefferson College, which maintained two campuses, one in each of the towns.

That arrangement failed, and in 1869, the trustees voted to consolidate the two campuses in Washington.

Shortly thereafter, a number of Canonsburg residents and dissident trustees of Jefferson College sued, claiming that the consolidation was unconstitutional. They argued that the original 1802 charter for Jefferson College had been illegally usurped in the process. Specifically, they argued that the provision in the Jefferson College Charter that it "shall not be altered or alterable by any ordinance or law of the said trustees, nor in any other manner than by an act of the legislature of the Commonwealth" prohibited such a move. Their lawsuit went to the Pennsylvania Supreme Court. It ruled, on January 3, 1870, that the consolidation had been done in a legal manner. The Jefferson College partisans appealed to the United States Supreme Court, saying that the consolidation had been contrary to the United States Constitution. The court ruled otherwise, and upheld the consolidation in a December 1871 opinion written by Justice Nathan Clifford.
