= Paige v. Banks =

- Supreme Court of the United States

Argued Apr. 11, 16, 1872 Decided May 6, 1872
- Full case name: Paige v. Banks
- Citations: 80 U.S. 608 (more) 13 Wall. 608; 20 L. Ed. 709

Holding
- An agreement that transfers a copyright from the original author to a second party for perpetuity does not end with the statutory limit of copyright at the time the parties made the deal. If a later act of Congress extends copyright and the extension is available to the work, the second party still controls the copyright or perpetual license to that copyright.

Court membership
- Chief Justice Salmon P. Chase Associate Justices Samuel Nelson · Nathan Clifford; Noah H. Swayne · Samuel F. Miller; David Davis · Stephen J. Field; William Strong · Joseph P. Bradley

Paige v. Banks, 80 U.S. (13 Wall.) 608 (1872), was a United States Supreme Court case in which the Court held an agreement that transfers a copyright from the original author to a second party for perpetuity does not end with the statutory limit of copyright at the time the parties made the deal. If a later act of Congress extends copyright and the extension is available to the work, the second party still controls the copyright or perpetual license to that copyright.

This is a notable departure from the Statute of Anne, a 1709 law from Great Britain that was influential in the United States's copyright history. That statute, from which the United States borrowed for the Copyright Act of 1790, provided for a maximum of two fourteen year terms of the author controlling a work's copyright monopoly before it entered the public domain. Under that British scheme, an author could sign away their copyright during the first term and it would automatically return to them at the beginning of the second term.
