= Clinton v. Englebrecht =

- Supreme Court of the United States

Decided April 15, 1872
- Full case name: Clinton v. Englebrecht
- Citations: 80 U.S. 434 (more)

Holding
- A federal tribunal that is not organized under Article III cannot use statutes referring to Article III courts to call a jury and cannot call a jury at all unless its operating statute grants that power to it.

Court membership
- Chief Justice Salmon P. Chase Associate Justices Samuel Nelson · Nathan Clifford; Noah H. Swayne · Samuel F. Miller; David Davis · Stephen J. Field; William Strong · Joseph P. Bradley

Case opinion
- Majority: Chase, joined by unanimous

Clinton v. Englebrecht, 80 U.S. 434 (1872), was a United States Supreme Court case in which the court held that a federal tribunal that is not organized under Article III cannot use statutes referring to Article III courts to call a jury and cannot call a jury at all unless its operating statute grants that power to it. The tribunal in this case was an Article IV tribunal called a territorial court.

== Background ==
=== Judicial oppression of Mormons in Utah Territory ===
Although Civil-War-era Republicanism is remembered for its anti-slavery, another of its primary political causes was anti-polygamy. Republicans regarded Utah Territory, home to many Mormon polygamists who used the territory's capacity for home rule to legitimize the practice, as just as bad as the slaver South. However, despite their relative autonomy, the territories contain federal courts run by federal judges who can by political appointees. Utah Territory was no different. Thus, anti-polygamy members of the Utah Territory Supreme Court, appointed by Republican presidents, actively persecuted Mormons throughout the nineteenth century, carrying out many prosecutions for adultery and cohabitation.

Constitutionally, a territorial court sits both as a federal court and as a court of the territory. This means that Congress may define the jurisdiction of the territorial court in its authorization statute or it may delegate the authority of organizing the territorial court to the territorial government.

In the 1850s, the territorial legislature responded to the federal judges' persecution by granting its local probate courts concurrent jurisdiction over civil and criminal matters, making the federal courts in the territory redundant. Additionally, the legislature required the territorial courts to use jury panels prepared by the probate courts. In 1870, a recently appointed federal judge on the Utah Territory Supreme Court, Justice James B. McKean, decided to reassert the power of the federal courts by having the territorial courts call their own juries anyway. The federal trial court began assembling non-Mormon grand juries to indict and non-Mormon trial juries to convict people for polygamy again.

=== The case ===
The plaintiffs were retail liquor dealers in the City of Salt Lake, and had refused to take out a license as required by an ordinance of the city. The defendants, acting under the same ordinance, thereupon proceeded to the store of the plaintiffs and destroyed $22,000 of liquors. The statute gave an action against any person who should willfully and maliciously damage or destroy the property of another and allowed the plaintiff to seek treble damages based on the value of whatever was destroyed. They did so.

The act of the territorial legislature, passed in 1859 and in force when the jury in this cause was summoned, required that "the county court" in each county to make a list of fifty men qualified to serve as jurors, and it directed the court's clerk to summon 24 eligible men to serve as petit jurors by drawing lots from this pool. Provision was further made for the drawing of the trial panel from this final list and for its completion by a new drawing or summons in case of a juror became ineligible or unavailable. For the trial of the cause, the record showed that the court originally directed a venire to be issued in conformity with this law, and that a venire was issued accordingly, but not served or returned.

The record also showed that under an order subsequently made, an open venire was issued to the federal marshal, which was served and returned with a panel of eighteen petit jurors. The court did this under the authority of statutes governing jury selection for Article III courts. The jurors thus summoned were summoned from the body of the county at the discretion of the marshal. Twelve jurors of this panel were placed in the jury box.

The defendants challenged the jury panel on the ground that the jurors had not been selected or summoned in conformity with the laws of the territory and with the original order of the court. This challenge was overruled. A judgment was entered for the plaintiffs for $59,063.25, which was affirmed on appeal by the Utah Territory Supreme Court. A writ of error to that court brought the cause to the United States Supreme Court.

== Opinion of the court ==
The Supreme Court issued an opinion on April 15, 1872. In response to the government's argument that the territory's law requiring the federal court's juries to be assembled by another body was unconstitutional, the court said "[W]e repeat that the alleged defects of the Utah jury law are not here in question. What we are to pass upon is the legality of the mode actually adopted for empanelling the jury in this case. If the court had no authority to adopt that mode, the challenge to the array was well taken, and should have been allowed." Because the territory's courts were not Article III courts, they could not use the jury statute referring to Article III courts. Therefore, the Supreme Court held that the judges of the territorial courts had violated the law.

== Later developments ==
This decision was chaotic for Utah Territory's court system. It retroactively invalidated all cases that relied on juries called by the territorial court in the preceding two years. It caused the release of around 138 people who had been criminally convicted in that time, including Mormons who had been persecuted by Utah Territory Supreme Court Justice James B. McKean. It also provided relief to people who McKean was currently targeting, because it invalidated grand jury indictments and released people held on magistrates' warrants for "lewd and lascivious behavior," a criminal law that McKean frequently used to target Mormons for practicing polygamy.

Because the territorial legislature's statute still did not authorize Utah's federal courts to call juries, the Englebrecht decision meant that no cases requiring juries could be heard in those courts. This ground them to a halt. The territory's local probate court and ecclesiastical court continued on as before. The Poland Act of 1874, passed by Congress, made it clear that criminal law in the territory was a federal matter, taking those issues away from the local courts that were friendlier to Mormons.
