= Blyew v. United States =

1871 United States Supreme Court case

- Supreme Court of the United States

Argued February 20–21, 1871 Decided April 1, 1872
- Full case name: Blyew v. United States
- Citations: 80 U.S. 581 (more) 13 Wall. 581

Court membership
- Chief Justice Salmon P. Chase Associate Justices Samuel Nelson · Nathan Clifford; Noah H. Swayne · Samuel F. Miller; David Davis · Stephen J. Field; William Strong · Joseph P. Bradley

Case opinions
- Majority: Strong, joined by Nelson, Clifford, Miller, Davis, and Field
- Dissent: Bradley, joined by Swayne
- Chase took no part in the consideration or decision of the case.

Laws applied
- Civil Rights Act of 1866

Blyew v. United States, 80 U.S. 581 (1872), is a United States Supreme Court case that upheld a Kentucky law prohibiting African Americans from testifying against white defendants.

== Background ==
On August 29, 1868, two white men named John Blyew and George Kennard entered the house of the Foster family, an African American home in Lewis County, Kentucky. The two white men had a woman with them, and they were arguing with the Foster family insisting they needed to house the woman. The two white men attacked the family with an axe; four African-Americans died and many were injured, including children. Kennard used an axe and another bladed tool to hack at the bodies of the family members. Jack, his wife Sallie, and his grandmother Lucy Armstrong, who was blind, were killed outright. Richard, the Foster's 16-year-old son, hid under his father's body. He later regained consciousness and crawled 300 yards to a neighbor's house for help, but died two days later. The two youngest children were the only survivors: 8-year-old Laura Foster, who hid, and her 6-year-old sister Amelia, who was hacked in the head, but lived.

The case was heard before the United States Supreme Court in February 1871 addressing the civil rights of African Americans, as well as states' rights issues. The case involved the testimony of African-American victims of the attack. At the time of the murders, Kentucky law prohibited the testimony of a "Negro" against a white man and barred African Americans from serving on juries (the law was repealed in 1872). The testimony revealed that among the reasons for the murders was retaliation for the American Civil War and the potential for another war about African Americans. According to Blyew, Kennard had declared that "he thought there would soon be another war about the niggers; that when it did come, he intended to go to killing niggers, and he was not sure that he would not begin his work of killing them before the war should actually commence." The case was eventually moved to federal court under the Civil Rights Act of 1866, where the attackers were convicted. Both men were sentenced to death by hanging.

== Supreme Court ==
The Kentucky state government appealed to the Supreme Court, citing states' rights in defense of its laws prohibiting African Americans from testifying against whites. Writing for the majority, Associate Justice William Strong agreeing, ruling that this state murder cases could not be moved to federal court because an African American's interest in testifying is irrelevant to the law's focus on the rights of plaintiffs and defendants.

Associate Justices Joseph P. Bradley and Noah Haynes Swayne dissented, arguing that the Kentucky law perpetuated slavery by deeming Black witnesses unfit to testify. In 1866, Swayne had moved a Kentucky robbery case to a federal district court while riding circuit in United States v. Rhodes over the same issues involved in this case.

== Aftermath ==
The case was moved back to state court. Blyew's case ended in a hung jury. In 1873, however, before he could be retried, he escaped from prison with several other inmates. He was recaptured in 1890, found guilty of murder, and sentenced to life in prison. Blyew was pardoned by Acting Governor William Jackson Worthington, who had expressed doubts over the evidence used to convict him, on December 8, 1896. He was reported living with his daughter in Ohio in 1900. In 1876, Kennard was found guilty of murder and sentenced to life in prison with hard labor. According to one report at the time, his refusal to escape when he had the judge may have been in a factor in the jury's decision to spare his life. Kennard was pardoned by Governor Luke P. Blackburn on health grounds in 1883 and died on April 5, 1923, at the age of 82.
