= Attorney General McCormick =

Attorney General McCormick may refer to:

- Edward J. McCormack Jr. (1923–1997), Attorney General of Massachusetts
- Henry Clay McCormick (1844–1902), Attorney General of Pennsylvania
- Joseph McCormick (Ohio lawyer) (1814–1879), Attorney General of Ohio
