= Henry Stanbery =

28th U.S. Attorney General

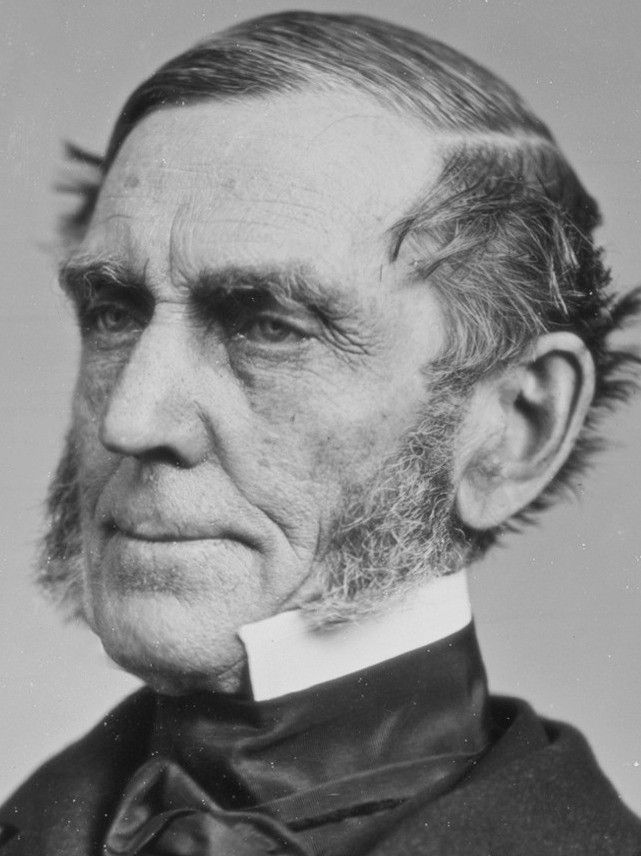

28th United States Attorney General
- In office July 23, 1866 – March 12, 1868
- President: Andrew Johnson
- Preceded by: James Speed
- Succeeded by: William Evarts

1st Attorney General of Ohio
- In office February 1846 – May 1851
- Governor: Mordecai Bartley; William Bebb; Seabury Ford; Reuben Wood
- Preceded by: Position established
- Succeeded by: Joseph McCormick

Personal details
- Born: February 20, 1803 New York City, New York
- Died: June 26, 1881 (aged 78) New York City
- Resting place: Spring Grove Cemetery, Cincinnati, Ohio
- Party: Whig (Before 1854); Republican (from 1854)
- Spouse(s): Frances Elizabeth Beecher (m. 1829-1840, her death); Cecilia Key Bond (m. 1841-1881, his death)
- Relations: William Stanbery (half-brother); Philemon Beecher (father-in-law); William Key Bond (father-in-law)
- Children: 5
- Education: Washington and Jefferson College (BA)
- Profession: Attorney
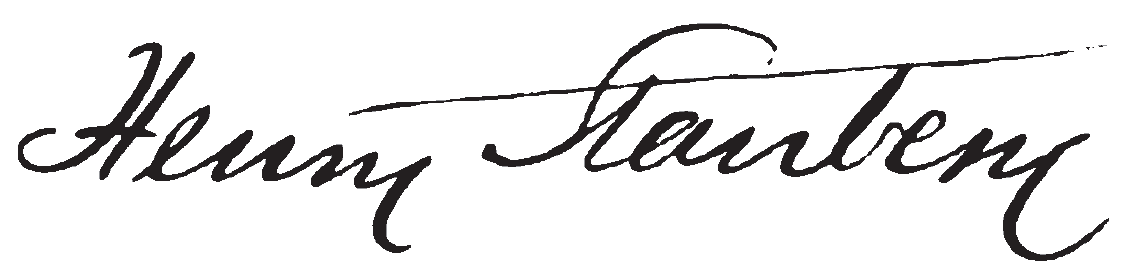
- Signature

Henry Stanbery (February 20, 1803 – June 26, 1881) was an American lawyer from Ohio. He was Ohio's first attorney general from 1846 to 1851 and the United States Attorney General from 1866 to 1868.

A native of New York City who was raised in Zanesville, Ohio, Stanbery graduated from Washington College in 1819 at age 16, studied law with two Zanesville attorneys, and attained admission to the bar as soon as he reached the minimum required age of 21.

Stanbery resided for many years in Lancaster, where he practiced law in partnership with Thomas Ewing. Stanbery was selected by the state legislature to serve as Ohio's first state attorney general, a post he held from 1846 to 1851. After leaving office he relocated to the Cincinnati area, where he continued to practice law.

In 1866, Stanbery was appointed U.S. Attorney General. He served until 1868 and worked to sustain President Andrew Johnson's view that the president should control post-Civil War Reconstruction, and that the former Confederate states should be readmitted to the Union even if they took no steps to guarantee rights to former slaves. In 1868, Stanbery resigned so he could join Johnson's defense team during his impeachment trial. Johnson was acquitted, and Johnson attempted to reappoint him as attorney general, but the U.S. Senate would not confirm him.

After Johnson left office, Stanbery returned to the Cincinnati area, where he continued to practice law until failing eyesight curbed his activities in 1880. He traveled to New York City for surgery to remove cataracts, which did not improve his vision, and he was blind for the last six months of his life. He was residing temporarily in New York City while continuing to seek treatment when he died on June 26, 1881. Stanbery was buried at Spring Grove Cemetery in Cincinnati.

== Early life ==
Henry Stanbery was born in New York City on February 20, 1803, a son of Jonas Stanbery, a physician and land speculator, and his second wife Ann Lucy (McCready) Seaman Stanbery. The family moved to Zanesville, Ohio, in 1814, and Stanbery revealed himself to be a precocious student while attending a special private school. At age 12, he began attendance at Washington College in Washington, Pennsylvania (now Washington and Jefferson College), where he was a member of the Union Literary Society.

== Legal career ==
=== Start ===
After his 1819 college graduation, Stanbery studied law in Zanesville first with attorney Ebenezer Granger, and after Granger's death with Charles B. Goddard. He was admitted to the bar in 1824, and began to practice with Thomas Ewing in Fairfield County, Ohio.

=== Ohio Attorney General ===
In 1846, the Ohio General Assembly elected Stanbery to serve as Ohio Attorney General, the first person to hold the post. He moved from his home in Lancaster to the state capital of Columbus to assume his new duties. As the initial holder of the position, Stanbery spent much of his time and effort on determining its duties and responsibilities and organizing his staff. His work included creation of a case-tracking system and uniform crime report format for county prosecutors and a successful lobbying campaign to obtain the power to negotiate with individuals and corporations that were in debt to the state. Once he obtained this power in 1848, Stanbery cleared a backlog of existing lawsuits and cases by entering into agreements for partial payment or payment over time.

In 1850 he was elected a delegate to the 1850-1851 state constitutional convention. In 1853 he moved to Cincinnati, and in 1857 he moved across the Ohio River to Fort Thomas, Kentucky, where he owned an elegant hilltop mansion, The Highlands.

=== U.S. Supreme Court nomination ===
On April 16, 1866, President Andrew Johnson nominated Stanbery as an associate justice on the United States Supreme Court, to fill the vacancy created by the death of John Catron. The Republicans who controlled Congress were at odds with Johnson over post-Civil War Reconstruction. Therefore, rather than consider the Stanbery nomination, Congress instead passed the Judicial Circuits Act in July 1866 reducing the size of the Supreme Court.

Prior to being nominated, in March 1866, Stanbery assisted Attorney General James Speed in arguing Ex parte Milligan before the Supreme Court. In its decision the Court held that military tribunals for civilian defendants were illegal in jurisdictions where the civilian criminal justice system was functioning.

=== U.S. Attorney General ===
Johnson then nominated Stanbery for Attorney General, and he was confirmed by the U.S. Senate.

Stanbery loyally supported Johnson during his longstanding fight with Congress over Reconstruction. He assisted in drafting Johnson's veto of the first Reconstruction Act. After Congress overrode Johnson's vetoes of the first and second Reconstruction Acts, Stanbery provided opinions containing narrow interpretations bolstering Johnson's position on the issue. In Johnson's view, the president had responsibility for Reconstruction, and he intended to return the former Confederate states to the Union and full Congressional representation as soon as possible, without guaranteeing the rights of the former slaves who had been freed during the war. Stanbery agreed, arguing that the federal government had no right to interfere with the states in their administration of their governments and legal systems. Congress determined to take control of Reconstruction, compel former Confederates to prove their loyalty before readmission to the Union, and protect the rights of African Americans. In the third Reconstruction Act, which Johnson and Stanbery opposed, Congress limited the president's authority with respect to post-war Reconstruction and became predominant in the process.

As Attorney General, he argued Mississippi v. Johnson (1867), which held that the separation of powers barred the Supreme Court from issuing an injunction against the President when he implemented Reconstruction by executive action, in effect leaving Reconstruction as a political matter to be decided between the president and Congress. In Georgia v. Stanton (1868), Stanbery successfully argued that the court did not have jurisdiction over the political question of Reconstruction, which again left the matter to the executive and legislative branches.

=== Andrew Johnson impeachment trial ===
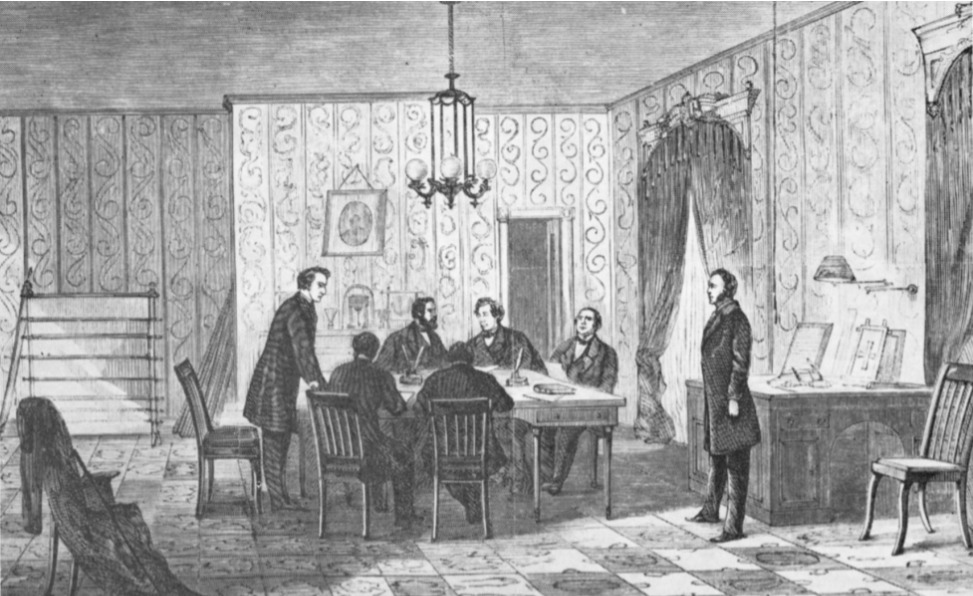
Illustration of President Johnson consulting with his counsel

When Congress moved to impeach Johnson as the result of the Reconstruction dispute, Stanbery resigned as attorney general on March 12, 1868, and joined his defense team. An illness limited Stanbery's participation in Johnson's trial, but he submitted several opinions and arguments in writing to aid Johnson's other attorneys. Much of his effort focused on ensuring that Johnson received due process, which had the effect of slowing the proceedings and making a conviction in the heat of the moment less likely. By the time Johnson was acquitted, Stanbery had rejoined the team, and he took part in several pro-Johnson celebrations.

After the trial, Johnson renominated Stanbery for Attorney General, but the U.S. Senate refused to confirm him. Stanbery then returned to Ohio to resume his law practice.

== Later career ==
Stanbery returned to the Cincinnati area, where he resumed practicing law and served as president of the city's bar association from 1873 to 1876. He wrote occasional articles on political and legal questions, and also delivered lectures and speeches. He was also a longtime member of St. Paul's Episcopal Church in Newport, Kentucky.

== Retirement and death ==
In his later years, Stanbery's eyesight worsened as the result of cataracts, and his wife and he moved to New York City to seek treatment. He underwent surgery to remove the cataracts, but his eyesight continued to fail until he was blind for the last six months of his life. He continued to reside in New York City while seeking treatment, but died there on June 26, 1881, after bronchitis left him unable to breathe while on a carriage ride in Central Park. He was buried at Spring Grove Cemetery in Cincinnati.

== Family ==
Stanbery was married in 1829 to Frances E. Beecher of Lancaster, a daughter of Philemon Beecher. They had five children - Frances E., Henry, Philemon B., Louisa, and George - the last three of whom survived him. Frances Beecher Stanbery died in 1840, and in 1841 Stanbery married Cecilia Key Bond, a daughter of William Key Bond.

Henry Stanbery's half-brother William Stanbery was also an attorney, and served in the United States House of Representatives from 1827 to 1833.

== See also ==
- Unsuccessful nominations to the Cabinet of the United States
- Unsuccessful nominations to the Supreme Court of the United States

Legal offices
| New office | Attorney General of Ohio; 1846–1851 | Succeeded by Joseph McCormick |
| Preceded by James Speed | United States Attorney General; 1866–1868 | Succeeded by William Evarts |
