= List of United States Supreme Court cases, volume 80 =

Supreme Court of the United States
- Interactive map of Supreme Court of the United States
- 38°53′26″N 77°00′16″W
- Established: March 4, 1789; 236 years ago
- Location: Washington, D.C.
- Coordinates: 38°53′26″N 77°00′16″W
- Composition method: Presidential nomination with Senate confirmation
- Authorised by: Constitution of the United States, Art. III, § 1
- Judge term length: life tenure, subject to impeachment and removal
- Number of positions: 9 (by statute)
- Website: supremecourt.gov

This is a list of cases reported in volume 80 (13 Wall.) of United States Reports, decided by the Supreme Court of the United States in 1872.

== Nominative reports ==
In 1874, the U.S. government created the United States Reports, and retroactively numbered older privately published case reports as part of the new series. As a result, cases appearing in volumes 1–90 of U.S. Reports have dual citation forms; one for the volume number of U.S. Reports, and one for the volume number of the reports named for the relevant reporter of decisions (these are called "nominative reports").

=== John William Wallace ===
Starting with the 66th volume of U.S. Reports, the Reporter of Decisions of the Supreme Court of the United States was John William Wallace. Wallace was Reporter of Decisions from 1863 to 1874, covering volumes 68 through 90 of United States Reports which correspond to volumes 1 through 23 of his Wallace's Reports. As such, the dual form of citation to, for example, Pumpelly v. Green Bay Co. is 80 U.S. (13 Wall.) 166 (1872).

Wallace's Reports were the final nominative reports for the US Supreme Court; starting with volume 91, cases were identified simply as "(volume #) U.S. (page #) (year)".

== Justices of the Supreme Court at the time of 80 U.S. (13 Wall.) ==
The Supreme Court is established by Article III, Section 1 of the Constitution of the United States, which says: "The judicial Power of the United States, shall be vested in one supreme Court . . .". The size of the Court is not specified; the Constitution leaves it to Congress to set the number of justices. Under the Judiciary Act of 1789 Congress originally fixed the number of justices at six (one chief justice and five associate justices). Since 1789 Congress has varied the size of the Court from six to seven, nine, ten, and back to nine justices (always including one chief justice).

When the cases in 80 U.S. (13 Wall.) were decided the Court comprised these nine members:

Portrait	Justice	Office	Home State	Succeeded	Date confirmed by the Senate (Vote)	Tenure on Supreme Court
	Salmon P. Chase	Chief Justice	Ohio	Roger B. Taney	December 6, 1864 (Acclamation)	December 15, 1864 – May 7, 1873 (Died)
	Samuel Nelson	Associate Justice	New York	Smith Thompson	February 14, 1845 (Acclamation)	February 27, 1845 – November 28, 1872 (Retired)
	Nathan Clifford	Associate Justice	Maine	Benjamin Robbins Curtis	January 12, 1858 (26–23)	January 21, 1858 – July 25, 1881 (Died)
	Noah Haynes Swayne	Associate Justice	Ohio	John McLean	January 24, 1862 (38–1)	January 27, 1862 – January 24, 1881 (Retired)
	Samuel Freeman Miller	Associate Justice	Iowa	Peter Vivian Daniel	July 16, 1862 (Acclamation)	July 21, 1862 – October 13, 1890 (Died)
	David Davis	Associate Justice	Illinois	John Archibald Campbell	December 8, 1862 (Acclamation)	December 10, 1862 – March 4, 1877 (Resigned)
	Stephen Johnson Field	Associate Justice	California	newly created seat	March 10, 1863 (Acclamation)	May 10, 1863 – December 1, 1897 (Retired)
	William Strong	Associate Justice	Pennsylvania	Robert Cooper Grier	February 18, 1870 (No vote recorded)	March 14, 1870 – December 14, 1880 (Retired)
	Joseph P. Bradley	Associate Justice	New Jersey	newly created seat	March 21, 1870 (46–9)	March 23, 1870 – January 22, 1892 (Died)

== Notable Cases in 80 U.S. (13 Wall.) ==
=== United States v. Klein ===
The Supreme Court's decision in United States v. Klein, 80 U.S. (13 Wall.) 128 (1872) stands for the proposition that the legislative branch cannot impair the exclusive powers of another branch; it recognizes and supports the fundamental value of separation of powers defined by the Constitution. Specifically, Klein means that Congress may not direct the outcome of a case by prescribing the rule of decision, nor may Congress impair the power and effect of a Presidential pardon.

=== Tarble's Case ===
In Tarble's Case, 80 U.S. (13 Wall.) 397 (1872), the Supreme Court held that a state judge has no jurisdiction to issue a writ of habeas corpus, or to continue proceedings under the writ once issued, for the discharge of a person held by the authority of the United States by an officer of the federal government.

=== Watson v. Jones ===
Watson v. Jones, 80 U.S. (13 Wall.) 679 (1872), was based upon a dispute regarding the Walnut Street Presbyterian Church in Kentucky. The Court held that in adjudications of church property disputes: (1) courts cannot rule on the truth or falsity of a religious teaching; (2) if a previous ecclesiastical authority structure existed before the dispute, then courts should defer to the decision of that structure; and (3) in the absence of such an internal authority structure, courts should defer to the wishes of a majority of the congregation.

== Citation style ==
Under the Judiciary Act of 1789 the federal court structure at the time comprised District Courts, which had general trial jurisdiction; Circuit Courts, which had mixed trial and appellate (from the US District Courts) jurisdiction; and the United States Supreme Court, which had appellate jurisdiction over the federal District and Circuit courts—and for certain issues over state courts. The Supreme Court also had limited original jurisdiction (i.e., in which cases could be filed directly with the Supreme Court without first having been heard by a lower federal or state court). There were one or more federal District Courts and/or Circuit Courts in each state, territory, or other geographical region.

Bluebook citation style is used for case names, citations, and jurisdictions.

- "C.C.D." = United States Circuit Court for the District of . . .
  - e.g.,"C.C.D.N.J." = United States Circuit Court for the District of New Jersey
- "D." = United States District Court for the District of . . .
  - e.g.,"D. Mass." = United States District Court for the District of Massachusetts
- "E." = Eastern; "M." = Middle; "N." = Northern; "S." = Southern; "W." = Western
  - e.g.,"C.C.S.D.N.Y." = United States Circuit Court for the Southern District of New York
  - e.g.,"M.D. Ala." = United States District Court for the Middle District of Alabama
- "Ct. Cl." = United States Court of Claims
- The abbreviation of a state's name alone indicates the highest appellate court in that state's judiciary at the time.
  - e.g.,"Pa." = Supreme Court of Pennsylvania
  - e.g.,"Me." = Supreme Judicial Court of Maine

== List of cases in 80 U.S. (13 Wall.) ==
Case Name	Page and year	Opinion of the Court	Concurring opinion(s)	Dissenting opinion(s)	Lower court	Disposition
Bethell v. Mathews	1 (1872)	Chase	none	none	C.C.D. La.	affirmed
Norwich Transportation Company v. Flint	3 (1872)	Bradley	none	none	C.C.D. Conn.	affirmed
Yeager v. Farwell	6 (1872)	Davis	none	none	C.C.D. Mo.	affirmed
Webb v. Sharp	14 (1872)	Bradley	none	none	Sup. Ct. D.C.	affirmed
Boyden v. United States	17 (1872)	Strong	none	none	C.C.D. Wis.	affirmed
United States v. Wormer	25 (1872)	Bradley	none	none	Ct. Cl.	reversed
Low v. Austin	29 (1872)	Field	none	none	Cal.	reversed
United States v. Clyde	35 (1872)	Bradley	none	none	Ct. Cl.	reversed
Clyde v. United States	38 (1872)	Bradley	none	none	Ct. Cl.	reversed
Toof v. Martin	40 (1872)	Field	none	none	C.C.D. Ark.	affirmed
Wheeler v. Harris	51 (1872)	Chase	none	none	C.C.S.D.N.Y.	dismissed
Bevans v. United States	56 (1872)	Strong	none	Chase	C.C.E.D. Ark.	affirmed
Halliburton v. United States	63 (1872)	Strong	none	Chase	C.C.E.D. Ark.	affirmed
Rice v. Houston	66 (1872)	Davis	none	none	C.C.M.D. Tenn.	affirmed
Curtis v. Whitney	68 (1872)	Miller	none	none	Wis.	affirmed
Johnson v. Towsley	72 (1872)	Miller	none	Clifford	Neb.	affirmed
Samson v. Smiley	91 (1872)	Miller	none	none	Neb.	affirmed
Gibson v. Chouteau	92 (1872)	Field	none	none	Mo.	reversed
Norwich Company v. Wright	104 (1872)	Bradley	none	none	C.C.D. Conn.	affirmed
United States v. Klein	128 (1872)	Chase	none	Miller	Ct. Cl.	affirmed
Carroll v. United States	151 (1872)	Chase	none	none	Ct. Cl.	reversed
Armstrong v. United States	154 (1872)	Chase	none	none	Ct. Cl.	reversed
Pargoud v. United States	156 (1872)	Chase	none	none	Ct. Cl.	reversed
Semmes v. Hartford Insurance Company	158 (1872)	Miller	none	none	C.C.D. Conn.	reversed
Reiche v. Smythe	162 (1872)	Davis	none	none	C.C.S.D.N.Y.	reversed
Pumpelly v. Green Bay and Mississippi Canal Company	166 (1872)	Miller	none	none	C.C.D. Wis.	reversed
Steinbach v. Insurance Company	183 (1872)	Chase	none	none	C.C.D. Md.	affirmed
Philip v. Nock	185 (1872)	Chase	none	none	Sup. Ct. D.C.	dismissal denied
Hampton v. Rouse	187 (1872)	Chase	none	none	C.C.S.D. Miss.	dismissed
Wells v. McGregor	188 (1872)	Chase	none	none	Mont.	dismissed
Pennsylvania College Cases	190 (1872)	Clifford	none	none	Pa.	affirmed (both cases)
Union Mutual Insurance Company v. Wilkinson	222 (1872)	Miller	none	none	C.C.D. Iowa	affirmed
Ex parte McNiel	236 (1872)	Swayne	none	none	E.D.N.Y.	prohibition denied
Bath County v. Amy	244 (1872)	Strong	none	none	C.C.D. Ky.	reversed
United States v. Avery	251 (1872)	Chase	none	none	C.C.D.S.C.	certification
United States v. Wilder	254 (1872)	Davis	none	none	Ct. Cl.	reversed
Klinger v. Missouri	257 (1872)	Bradley	none	none	Mo.	dismissed
Wilmington and Weldon Railroad Company v. Reid	264 (1872)	Davis	none	none	N.C.	reversed
Raleigh and Gaston Railroad Company v. Reid	269 (1872)	Davis	none	none	N.C.	reversed
Chicago and Northwestern Railway Company v. Whitton's Administrator	270 (1872)	Field	none	none	C.C.E.D. Wis.	affirmed
Myers v. Croft	291 (1872)	Davis	none	none	C.C.D. Neb.	affirmed
Pendleton County v. Amy	297 (1872)	Strong	none	none	C.C.D. Ky.	reversed
Williams v. Kirtland	306 (1872)	Field	none	none	C.C.D. Minn.	reversed
Delaware and Hudson Canal Company v. Clark	311 (1872)	Strong	none	none	C.C.S.D.N.Y.	affirmed
Geographical names designating the good's place of production (as opposed to the good's producer) cannot be trademarked.
The Patapsco	329 (1872)	Davis	none	none	C.C.S.D.N.Y.	affirmed
Bradley v. Fisher	335 (1872)	Field	none	none	Sup. Ct. D.C.	affirmed
Gay's Gold	358 (1872)	Miller	none	none	C.C.D. La.	affirmed
Robinson v. United States	363 (1872)	Davis	none	none	C.C.D. Cal.	affirmed
Hall and Long v. Nashville and Chattanooga Railroad Company	367 (1872)	Strong	none	none	C.C.M.D. Tenn.	reversed
East Saginaw Salt Manufacturing Company v. City of East Saginaw	373 (1872)	Bradley	none	none	Mich.	affirmed
Slaughter's Administrator v. Gerson	379 (1872)	Field	none	none	C.C.D. Md.	affirmed
Alexander v. Roulet	386 (1872)	Davis	none	none	C.C.D. Cal.	affirmed
The Siren	389 (1872)	Swayne	none	none	D. Mass.	affirmed
Tarble's Case	397 (1872)	Field	none	Chase	Wis.	reversed
Kitchen v. Bedford	413 (1872)	Bradley	none	none	C.C.D. Kan.	reversed
Davenport v. Lamb	418 (1872)	Field	none	none	C.C.D. Ore.	affirmed
West Tennessee Bank v. Citizens' Bank	432 (1872)	Swayne	none	none	La.	dismissed
Clinton v. Englebrecht	434 (1872)	Chase	none	none	Sup. Ct. Terr. Utah	reversed
United States v. Vigil	449 (1872)	Davis	none	none	Sup. Ct. Terr. N.M.	reversed
Tucker v. Spalding	453 (1872)	Miller	none	none	C.C.D. Cal.	reversed
Butler v. Watkins	456 (1872)	Strong	none	none	C.C.D. La.	reversed
Caujolle v. Ferri	465 (1872)	Davis	none	none	C.C.D.N.Y.	affirmed
The Ariadne	475 (1872)	Swayne	none	none	C.C.S.D.N.Y.	reversed
Carpentier v. Montgomery	480 (1872)	Bradley	none	none	C.C.D. Cal.	affirmed
Chew v. Brumagen	497 (1872)	Strong	none	none	N.J.	reversed
French v. Edwards	506 (1872)	Field	none	Miller	C.C.D. Cal.	reversed
Milwaukee and St. Paul Railway Company v. Soutter	517 (1872)	Bradley	none	Field	C.C.D. Wis.	affirmed
Kentucky v. Boutwell	526 (1872)	Davis	none	none	original	mandamus denied
Stockwell v. United States	531 (1872)	Strong	none	Field, Miller	C.C.D. Me.	affirmed
The Twenty Per Cent Cases	568 (1872)	Clifford	none	none	Ct. Cl.	affirmed (all cases)
Blyew v. United States	581 (1872)	Strong	none	Bradley	C.C.D. Ky.	reversed
Mason v. Rollins	602 (1872)	Chase	none	none	C.C.N.D. Ill.	affirmed
Insurance Company v. Barton	603 (1872)	Swayne	none	none	C.C.D. Mo.	affirmed
Dooley v. Smith	604 (1872)	Miller	none	Field	Ky.	reversed
Paige v. Banks	608 (1872)	Davis	none	none	C.C.S.D.N.Y.	affirmed
Phoenix Mutual Life Insurance Company v. Bailey	616 (1872)	Clifford	none	none	Sup. Ct. D.C.	affirmed
United States v. Russell	623 (1872)	Clifford	none	none	Ct. Cl.	affirmed
Pugh v. United States	633 (1872)	Chase	none	none	Ct. Cl.	affirmed
United States v. Kimbal	636 (1872)	Swayne	none	none	Ct. Cl.	reversed
White v. Hart	646 (1872)	Swayne	none	none	Ga.	reversed
Osborn v. Nicholson	654 (1872)	Swayne	none	Chase	C.C.D. Ark.	reversed
Ex parte Russell	664 (1872)	Bradley	none	Chase	Ct. Cl.	mandamus denied
Great Western Insurance Company v. Thwing	672 (1872)	Bradley	none	Clifford	C.C.D. Mass.	reversed
Watson v. Jones	679 (1872)	Miller	none	Clifford	C.C.D. Ky.	affirmed
The Mabey	738 (1872)	Clifford	none	none	C.C.D.N.Y.	commission denied

== See also ==
certificate of division
