= List of United States Supreme Court cases, volume 73 =

Supreme Court of the United States
- Interactive map of Supreme Court of the United States
- 38°53′26″N 77°00′16″W
- Established: March 4, 1789; 237 years ago
- Location: Washington, D.C.
- Coordinates: 38°53′26″N 77°00′16″W
- Composition method: Presidential nomination with Senate confirmation
- Authorised by: Constitution of the United States, Art. III, § 1
- Judge term length: life tenure, subject to impeachment and removal
- Number of positions: 9 (by statute)
- Website: supremecourt.gov

This is a list of cases reported in volume 73 (6 Wall.) of United States Reports, decided by the Supreme Court of the United States in 1867 and 1868.

== Nominative reports ==
In 1874, the U.S. government created the United States Reports, and retroactively numbered older privately published case reports as part of the new series. As a result, cases appearing in volumes 1–90 of U.S. Reports have dual citation forms; one for the volume number of U.S. Reports, and one for the volume number of the reports named for the relevant reporter of decisions (these are called "nominative reports").

=== John William Wallace ===
Starting with the 66th volume of U.S. Reports, the Reporter of Decisions of the Supreme Court of the United States was John William Wallace. Wallace was Reporter of Decisions from 1863 to 1874, covering volumes 68 through 90 of United States Reports which correspond to volumes 1 through 23 of his Wallace's Reports. As such, the dual form of citation to, for example, Prentice v. Pickersgill is 73 U.S. (6 Wall.) 511 (1867).

Wallace's Reports were the final nominative reports for the US Supreme Court; starting with volume 91, cases were identified simply as "(volume #) U.S. (page #) (year)".

== Justices of the Supreme Court at the time of 73 U.S. (6 Wall.) ==
The Supreme Court is established by Article III, Section 1 of the Constitution of the United States, which says: "The judicial Power of the United States, shall be vested in one supreme Court . . .". The size of the Court is not specified; the Constitution leaves it to Congress to set the number of justices. Under the Judiciary Act of 1789 Congress originally fixed the number of justices at six (one chief justice and five associate justices). Since 1789 Congress has varied the size of the Court from six to seven, nine, ten, and back to nine justices (always including one chief justice).

To prevent President Andrew Johnson from appointing any justices, a hostile Congress passed the Judicial Circuits Act of 1866, eliminating three of the ten seats from the Supreme Court as they became vacant, and so potentially reducing the size of the court to seven justices. The vacancy caused by the death of Justice John Catron in 1865 had not been filled, so after Justice James Moore Wayne died in July 1867 there were eight justices left on the court when the cases in 73 U.S. (6 Wall.) were decided:

Portrait	Justice	Office	Home State	Succeeded	Date confirmed by the Senate (Vote)	Tenure on Supreme Court
	Salmon P. Chase	Chief Justice	Ohio	Roger B. Taney	December 6, 1864 (Acclamation)	December 15, 1864 – May 7, 1873 (Died)
	Samuel Nelson	Associate Justice	New York	Smith Thompson	February 14, 1845 (Acclamation)	February 27, 1845 – November 28, 1872 (Retired)
	Robert Cooper Grier	Associate Justice	Pennsylvania	Henry Baldwin	August 4, 1846 (Acclamation)	August 10, 1846 – January 31, 1870 (Retired)
	Nathan Clifford	Associate Justice	Maine	Benjamin Robbins Curtis	January 12, 1858 (26–23)	January 21, 1858 – July 25, 1881 (Died)
	Noah Haynes Swayne	Associate Justice	Ohio	John McLean	January 24, 1862 (38–1)	January 27, 1862 – January 24, 1881 (Retired)
	Samuel Freeman Miller	Associate Justice	Iowa	Peter Vivian Daniel	July 16, 1862 (Acclamation)	July 21, 1862 – October 13, 1890 (Died)
	David Davis	Associate Justice	Illinois	John Archibald Campbell	December 8, 1862 (Acclamation)	December 10, 1862 – March 4, 1877 (Resigned)
	Stephen Johnson Field	Associate Justice	California	newly created seat	March 10, 1863 (Acclamation)	May 10, 1863 – December 1, 1897 (Retired)

== Notable Cases in 73 U.S. (6 Wall.) ==
=== Crandall v. Nevada ===
In Crandall v. Nevada, 73 U.S. (6 Wall.) 35 (1868), the Supreme Court held that a state cannot inhibit people from leaving the state by taxing them. A Nevada statute imposed a $1 tax on every person leaving the state by railroad, stage coach, or other vehicles engaged or employed in the business of transporting passengers for hire. The Court reasoned that the right to travel is a fundamental right. The people of the United States constitute one nation, and so no state may impose a tax on a person for the "privilege" of travel from or for passing through it.

=== Georgia v. Stanton ===
In Georgia v. Stanton, 73 U.S. (6 Wall.) 50 (1868), the Supreme Court held that it does not have jurisdiction over the political question of enforcement of the Reconstruction Acts against southern states. The case involved the federal government annulling state governments and replacing them with new ones.

== Citation style ==
Under the Judiciary Act of 1789 the federal court structure at the time comprised District Courts, which had general trial jurisdiction; Circuit Courts, which had mixed trial and appellate (from the US District Courts) jurisdiction; and the United States Supreme Court, which had appellate jurisdiction over the federal District and Circuit courts—and for certain issues over state courts. The Supreme Court also had limited original jurisdiction (i.e., in which cases could be filed directly with the Supreme Court without first having been heard by a lower federal or state court). There were one or more federal District Courts and/or Circuit Courts in each state, territory, or other geographical region.

Bluebook citation style is used for case names, citations, and jurisdictions.

- "C.C.D." = United States Circuit Court for the District of . . .
  - e.g.,"C.C.D.N.J." = United States Circuit Court for the District of New Jersey
- "D." = United States District Court for the District of . . .
  - e.g.,"D. Mass." = United States District Court for the District of Massachusetts
- "E." = Eastern; "M." = Middle; "N." = Northern; "S." = Southern; "W." = Western
  - e.g.,"C.C.S.D.N.Y." = United States Circuit Court for the Southern District of New York
  - e.g.,"M.D. Ala." = United States District Court for the Middle District of Alabama
- "Ct. Cl." = United States Court of Claims
- The abbreviation of a state's name alone indicates the highest appellate court in that state's judiciary at the time.
  - e.g.,"Pa." = Supreme Court of Pennsylvania
  - e.g.,"Me." = Supreme Judicial Court of Maine

== List of cases in 73 U.S. (6 Wall.) ==
Case Name	Page & year	Opinion of the Court	Concurring opinion(s)	Dissenting opinion(s)	Lower Court	Disposition
Mauran v. Alliance Ins. Co.	1 (1868)	Nelson	none	Chase	C.C.D. Mass.	affirmed
Haight v. Pittsburgh et al. R.R. Co.	15 (1868)	Grier	none	none	C.C.W.D. Pa.	affirmed
The Amelie	18 (1868)	Davis	none	none	C.C.D. Mass.	affirmed
Southern S.S. Co. v. Port of New Orleans	31 (1867)	Chase	none	none	La.	reversed
Crandall v. Nevada	35 (1868)	Miller	none	Clifford	Nev.	reversed
Georgia v. Stanton	50 (1868)	Nelson	Chase	none	original	dismissed
Lukins v. Aird	78 (1867)	Davis	none	none	W.D. Ark.	reversed
Wood v. Steele	80 (1867)	Swayne	none	none	C.C.D. Minn.	affirmed
Wilson v. Wall	83 (1867)	Grier	none	none	Ala.	reversed
The Watchful	91(1868)	Miller	none	none	E.D. La.	multiple
Wicker v. Hoppock	94 (1867)	Swayne	none	none	C.C.N.D. Ill.	affirmed
United States v. Adams	101 (1868)	Miller	none	none	Ct. Cl.	dismissal denied
League v. Atchison	112 (1868)	Grier	none	none	E.D. Tex.	reversed
Osterman v. Baldwin	116 (1867)	Davis	none	none	E.D. Tex.	affirmed
Walker v. Villavaso	124 (1868)	Nelson	none	none	La.	dismissed
Aetna Ins. Co. v. Webster	129 (1868)	Chase	none	none	C.C.E.D. Mich.	affirmed
Thompson v. Central O.R.R. Co.	134 (1868)	Davis	none	none	C.C.S.D. Ohio	reversed
West v. City of Aurora	139 (1868)	Chase	none	none	C.C.D. Ind.	affirmed
Rector v. Ashley	142 (1867)	Miller	none	none	Ark.	affirmed
Providence R. Co. v. Goodyear	153 (1868)	Chase	none	none	C.C.D.R.I.	dismissal denied
Savery v. Sypher	157 (1868)	Davis	none	none	C.C.D. Iowa	affirmed
Reichart v. Felps	160 (1868)	Grier	none	none	Ill.	affirmed
Riggs v. Johnson Cnty.	166 (1868)	Clifford	none	Miller	C.C.D. Iowa	reversed
Weber v. Lee Cnty.	210 (1868)	Clifford	none	none	C.C.N.D. Ill.	reversed
The Rock Island R.R.B.	213 (1867)	Field	none	none	N.D. Ill.	affirmed
The Hypodame	216 (1868)	Grier	none	none	C.C.S.D.N.Y.	affirmed
The Vanderbilt	225 (1868)	Clifford	none	none	C.C.S.D.N.Y.	affirmed
Mason v. Eldred	231 (1868)	Field	none	none	C.C.D. Wis.	certification
Georgia v. Grant	241 (1868)	Chase	none	none	original	continued
The Sea Witch	242 (1868)	Chase	none	none	E.D. La.	affirmed
McClane v. Boon	244 (1868)	Nelson	none	none	Or.	dismissed
Agricultural Co. v. Pierce Cnty.	246 (1867)	Miller	none	none	Sup. Ct. Terr. Wash.	dismissed
City of Nashville v. Cooper	247 (1868)	Swayne	none	none	C.C.M.D. Tenn.	reversed
Andrews v. Hensler	254 (1867)	Field	none	none	C.C.E.D. La.	affirmed
Millingar v. Hartupee	258 (1868)	Chase	none	none	Pa.	dismissed
The Flying Scud	263 (1867)	Nelson	none	none	E.D. La.	multiple
The Adela	266 (1868)	Chase	none	none	S.D. Fla.	affirmed
Slater v. Maxwell	268 (1868)	Field	none	none	D.W. Va.	reversed
Lum v. Robertson	277 (1867)	Davis	none	none	E.D. Tex.	affirmed
Barney v. City of Baltimore	280 (1868)	Miller	none	Clifford	C.C.D. Md.	reversed
United States ex rel. Crawford v. Addison	291 (1868)	Field	none	none	Sup. Ct. D.C.	reversed
Clements v. Moore	299 (1868)	Swayne	none	none	W.D. Tex.	reversed
Thompson v. Bowman	316 (1867)	Field	none	none	N.D. Miss.	reversed
Ex parte McCardle	318 (1868)	Chase	none	none	C.C.D. Miss.	dismissal denied
Selz v. Unna	327 (1868)	Clifford	none	none	C.C.N.D. Ill.	affirmed
Lorings v. Marsh	337 (1868)	Nelson	none	none	C.C.D. Mass.	affirmed
Mussina v. Cavazos	355 (1867)	Miller	none	none	E.D. Tex.	dismissal denied
Grisar v. McDowell	363 (1868)	Field	none	none	C.C.D. Cal.	affirmed
The Victory	382 (1868)	Miller	none	none	Mo.	dismissed
United States v. Hartwell	385 (1868)	Swayne	none	Miller	C.C.D. Mass.	certification
Stark v. Starrs	402 (1868)	Field	none	none	Or.	reversed
Turton v. Dufief	420 (1868)	Grier	none	none	C.C.D. Md.	affirmed
Mumford v. Wardwell	423 (1867)	Clifford	none	none	C.C.N.D. Cal.	affirmed
Silver v. Ladd	440 (1868)	Chase	none	none	Or.	dismissal denied
The Grace Girdler	441 (1867)	Chase	none	none	C.C.S.D.N.Y.	dismissal denied
White v. Cannon	443 (1868)	Field	none	none	La.	affirmed
Kail v. Wetmore	451 (1868)	Nelson	none	none	C.C.N.D. Ill.	dismissed
Vose v. Bronson	452 (1868)	Davis	none	none	C.C.D. Wis.	affirmed
Alviso v. United States	457 (1868)	Nelson	none	none	N.D. Cal.	appeal reinstated
Doe v. Considine	458 (1868)	Swayne	none	Grier	C.C.S.D. Ohio	affirmed
Walkley v. City of Muscatine	481 (1868)	Nelson	none	none	C.C.D. Iowa	affirmed
United States v. Eckford	484 (1868)	Clifford	none	none	Ct. Cl.	reversed
Foley v. Smith	492 (1868)	Miller	none	none	C.C.E.D. La.	affirmed
City of Washington v. Dennison	495 (1868)	Nelson	none	none	Sup. Ct. D.C.	supersedeas denied
Ex parte de Groot	497 (1868)	Nelson	none	none	Sup. Ct. D.C.	mandamus denied
The Battle	498 (1868)	Nelson	none	none	S.D. Fla.	affirmed
Gardner v. Collector	499 (1868)	Miller	none	none	C.C.S.D.N.Y.	affirmed
Prentice v. Pickersgill	511 (1868)	Chase	none	none	C.C.W.D. Pa.	affirmed
United States v. City of Keokuk I	514 (1868)	Clifford	none	none	C.C.N.D. Ill.	reversed
United States v. City of Keokuk II	518 (1868)	Clifford	none	none	C.C.N.D. Ill.	reversed
The Ouachita Cotton	521 (1868)	Swayne	none	none	C.C.D. Ill.	affirmed
Hanger v. Abbott	532 (1868)	Clifford	none	none	C.C.E.D. Ark.	affirmed
Clark v. United States	543 (1868)	Miller	none	none	Ct. Cl.	reversed
Tome v. Dubois	548 (1868)	Clifford	none	none	C.C.D. Md.	affirmed
Aetna Ins. Co. v. Hallock	556 (1868)	Miller	none	none	C.C.D. Ind.	affirmed
South F.C. Co. v. Gordon	561 (1868)	Swayne	none	Field	C.C.N.D. Cal.	reversed
United States v. Alire	573 (1868)	Nelson	none	none	Ct. Cl.	reversed
Roberts v. Graham	578 (1868)	Swayne	none	none	C.C.N.D. Cal.	affirmed
The Wren	582 (1868)	Nelson	none	none	S.D. Fla.	reversed
Stearns v. United States	589 (1868)	Swayne	none	none	N.D. Cal.	affirmed
Society for Sav. v. Coite	594 (1868)	Clifford	none	Chase	Conn.	affirmed
Provident Inst. v. Massachusetts	611 (1868)	Clifford	none	Chase	Mass.	affirmed
Hamilton Mfg. Co. v. Massachusetts	632 (1868)	Clifford	none	Chase	Mass.	affirmed
Gaines v. City of New Orleans	642 (1868)	Davis	none	none	C.C.D. La.	reversed
Gaines v. De la Croix	719 (1868)	Davis	none	none	C.C.D. La.	reversed
Williamson v. Suydam	723 (1868)	Clifford	none	none	C.C.S.D.N.Y.	affirmed
Crawshay v. Soutter	739 (1868)	Davis	none	none	C.C.D. Wis.	affirmed
Minnesota R.R. Co. v. Milwaukee & S.P.R.R. Co.	742 (1868)	Nelson	none	none	C.C.D. Wis.	affirmed
Fleming v. Soutter	747 (1868)	Nelson	none	none	C.C.D. Wis.	affirmed
Milwaukee & M.R.R. Co. v. Chamberlain	748 (1868)	Nelson	none	none	C.C.D. Wis.	multiple
La Crosse & M.R.R. Co. v. James	750 (1868)	Nelson	none	none	C.C.D. Wis.	affirmed
James v. Railroad Co.	752 (1868)	Nelson	none	none	C.C.D. Wis.	various
Smith v. Cockrill	756 (1868)	Nelson	none	none	C.C.D. Kan.	affirmed
Union Ins. Co. v. United States	759 (1868)	Chase	none	none	C.C.E.D. La.	reversed
Armstrong's Foundry	766 (1868)	Chase	none	none	C.C.E.D. La.	reversed
United States v. Hart	770 (1868)	Nelson	none	none	Sup. Ct. Terr. N.M.	affirmed
Cavazos v. Trevino	773 (1868)	Swayne	none	none	E.D. Tex.	affirmed
Strong v. United States	788 (1867)	Clifford	none	none	N.D. Fla.	affirmed

== See also ==
certificate of division
