= Newton Deming Strong =

American politician

Newton Deming Strong (October 17, 1809 – August 8, 1866) was an American lawyer and politician.

Strong, the second son of Rev. William Lightbourn Strong, and Harriet (Deming) Strong, was born October 17, 1809, while his father was settled at Somers, Conn. He graduated from Yale College in 1831. During one year, 1834–35, he was a tutor in the college. He then settled in Alton, Illinois, in the practice of the law, and in partnership with his classmate, Junius Hall. After about ten years residence at Alton, during a part of which time he was a member of the Illinois House of Representatives, he removed to Reading, Pa., being there in partnership with his brother, Hon. William Strong. He afterward practiced law in St. Louis, where he died, August 8, 1866, aged 56 years.

He married Matilda B. Edwards of Alton, in Sept., 1846, who died February 7, 1851, leaving no children.
