= Crandall v. Nevada =

- Supreme Court of the United States

Argued February 19, 1868 Decided March 16, 1868
- Full case name: Crandall v. State of Nevada
- Citations: 73 U.S. 35 (more) 6 Wall. 35; 18 L. Ed. 745; 1867 U.S. LEXIS 936

Holding
- A U.S. state cannot inhibit a person from leaving the state by taxing them. Judgment reversed, and the case remanded to the Supreme Court of the State of Nevada, with directions to discharge the plaintiff in error from custody.

Court membership
- Chief Justice Salmon P. Chase Associate Justices Samuel Nelson · Robert C. Grier; Nathan Clifford · Noah H. Swayne; Samuel F. Miller · David Davis; Stephen J. Field

Case opinions
- Majority: Miller
- Concurrence: Chase
- Concurrence: Clifford

Laws applied
- U.S. Const. art. I, § 8, cl. 3

Crandall v. Nevada, 73 U.S. (6 Wall.) 35 (1868), was a landmark decision of the US Supreme Court that affirmed that a state cannot inhibit people from leaving the state by taxing them.

The decision was written by Justice Miller. Chief Justice Chase and Justice Clifford concurred.

== Background ==
In 1867, a Nevada statute imposed a $1 tax on every person leaving the state by railroad, stage coach, or other vehicles engaged or employed in the business of transporting passengers for hire.

== Questions raised ==
- Does the tax violate Article I, Section 8, Clause 3 of the U.S. Constitution - the Commerce Clause - that gives the federal government authority to regulate commerce?

== Majority opinion ==
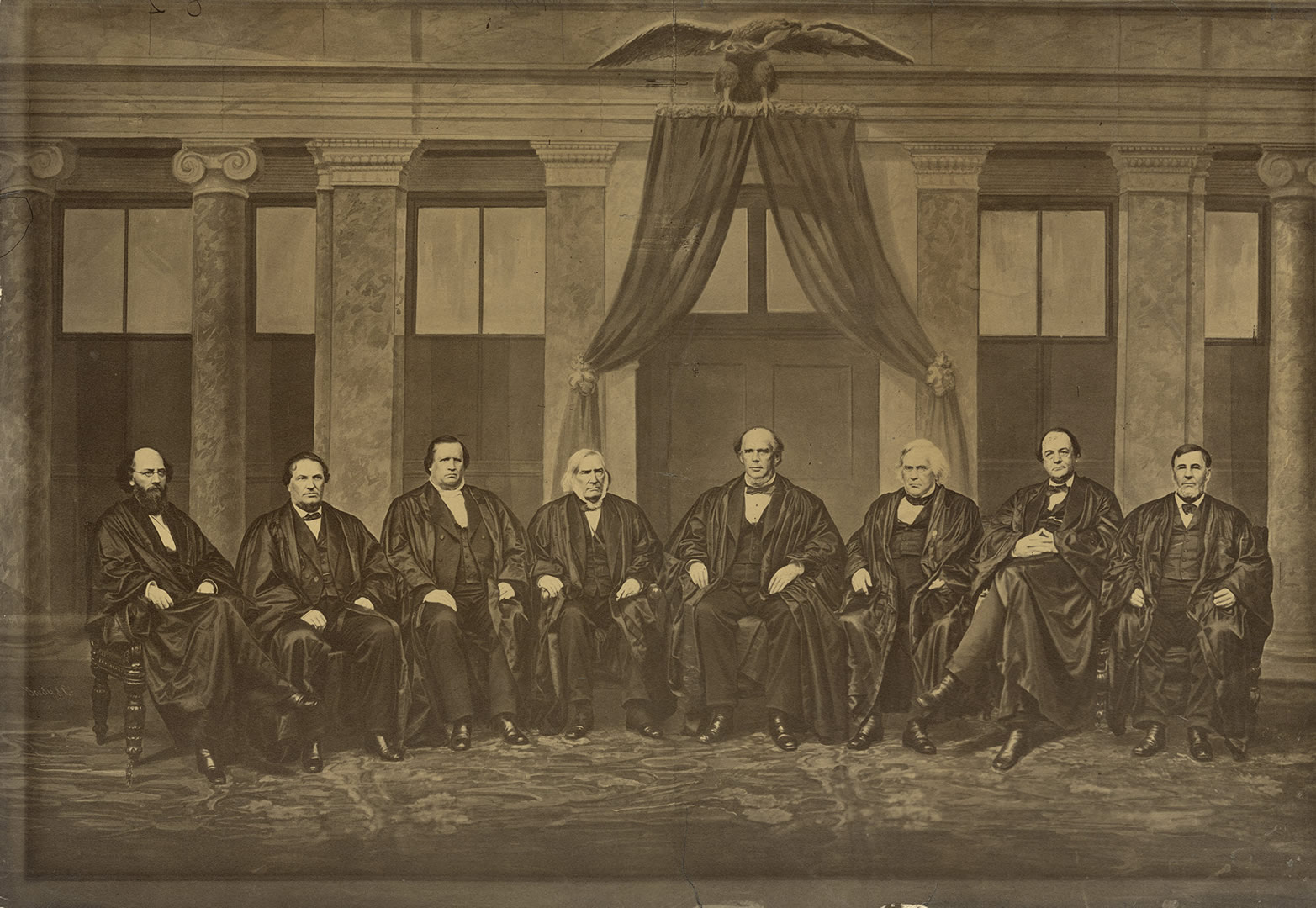
The Chase Court in 1868.

The Court reasoned that the right to travel is a fundamental right. The people of the United States constituting one nation, a State may not impose a tax on a person for the "privilege" of traveling from or for passing through it.

The Court stated that a person traveling is different from the transportation of a good, which prevents imposts or duties on a person. The tax was not a prohibited impost, and precedent from Cooley v. Board of Wardens was cited to show that a tax "does not itself institute any regulation of commerce of a national character...."

The Court also used precedent from McCulloch v. Maryland to show it is the very presence of the tax that is unconstitutional, not how much of a burden it is:

"But if the government has these rights on her own account, the citizen also has correlative rights. He has the right to come to the seat of the government... this right is in its nature independent of the will of any State over whose soil he must pass in the exercise of it."

== Concurring opinions ==
Chief Justice Chase and Justice Clifford concurred by basing their reasoning on the Commerce Clause of the Constitution. They claimed that the tax impeded interstate commerce.

== See also ==
- List of United States Supreme Court cases, volume 73
