= United States v. Klein =

- Supreme Court of the United States

Decided January 29, 1872
- Full case name: United States v. Klein
- Citations: 80 U.S. 128 (more) 13 Wall. 128; 20 L. Ed. 519; 1871 U.S. LEXIS 1319

Holding
- The 1870 statute was unconstitutional and Congress had exceeded its power by invading the province of the judicial branch by prescribing the rule of decision in a particular cause. Independently, the statute was unconstitutional as an encroachment on the President's power to issue pardons.

Court membership
- Chief Justice Salmon P. Chase Associate Justices Samuel Nelson · Nathan Clifford; Noah H. Swayne · Samuel F. Miller; David Davis · Stephen J. Field; William Strong · Joseph P. Bradley

Case opinions
- Majority: Chase, joined by Nelson, Clifford, Swayne, Davis, Field, Strong
- Dissent: Miller, joined by Bradley

United States v. Klein, 80 U.S. (13 Wall.) 128 (1871), was a landmark United States Supreme Court case stemming from the American Civil War (1861–1865) where Chief Justice Salmon P. Chase held that a Congressional statute "impairing the effect of a pardon, and thus infringing the constitutional power of the Executive" was unconstitutional.

== Background ==
On December 8, 1863, President Abraham Lincoln issued a proclamation offering a pardon to any person who had supported or fought for the Confederate Army, with full restoration of property rights, subject only to taking an oath of allegiance. The United States Congress had passed an act in 1863 that permitted an owner of property confiscated during the war to receive the proceeds from the sale of the confiscated property.

Based on the statute and the President's proclamation, V.F. Wilson took the oath of allegiance and honored it until his death on July 22, 1865. John A. Klein, administrator of Wilson's estate, then applied properly to the Court of Claims to recover the proceeds of the sale of property seized from Mr. Wilson.

Congress repealed the statute in 1867. The Court of Claims in 1869 decided that Wilson's estate was entitled to the proceeds from the sale of his property. In 1870, Congress passed a law that prohibited the use of a presidential pardon as the basis for claiming sale proceeds and further said that the acceptance of such a pardon was evidence that the person pardoned had provided support to the South and was ineligible to recover sale proceeds. The statute contained a jurisdiction stripping provision: "the Supreme Court, on appeal, shall have no further jurisdiction of the cause, and shall dismiss the same for want of jurisdiction".

The United States appealed to the Supreme Court based on the 1870 statute, which provided that since Wilson had accepted a presidential pardon, his estate was not entitled to the sale proceeds.

== Decision ==
In 1871, the Supreme Court ruled that the 1870 statute was unconstitutional and that Congress had exceeded its power by invading the province of the judicial branch by prescribing the rule of decision in a particular cause. The Court also ruled that Congress had impermissibly infringed the power of the executive branch by limiting the effect of a Presidential pardon.

Broadly speaking, Klein stands for the proposition that the legislative branch cannot impair the exclusive powers of another branch. Put another way, Klein recognizes and supports the fundamental value of separation of powers defined by the Constitution. Specifically, Klein means that Congress may not direct the outcome of a case by prescribing the rule of decision, nor may Congress impair the power and effect of a Presidential pardon. Read more broadly, Klein suggests, but does not state, that Congress may not use the Exceptions Clause to cripple the Court's ability to be the final arbiter of what the Constitution means; this conclusion is strengthened by the Court's holdings in City of Boerne v. Flores, 521 U.S. 507, and especially Dickerson v. United States, 530 U.S. 428.

The essence of the argument is one of separation of powers: that the Constitution vests the judicial power in the judicial branch, and that neither the legislative nor the executive branch may interfere with the functioning of the judiciary. When Congress passed a law that had the effect of prescribing the rule of decision in a particular cause, Congress "inadvertently passed the limit which separates the legislative from the judicial power." Klein, 80 U.S. at 147. As the Court says: "It is the intention of the Constitution that each of the great co-ordinate departments of the government — the Legislative, the Executive, and the Judicial — shall be, in its sphere, independent of the others." Id.

Justice Samuel F. Miller dissented, but only because he believed the respondent was not entitled to the property under the acts passed by Congress and the President's pardons. He wrote specifically (and since his opinion was joined by Justice Joseph P. Bradley, the decision of the Court in this respect was unanimous) that he agreed that "the act is unconstitutional, so far as it attempts to prescribe to the judiciary the effect to be given to an act of pardon or amnesty by the President. This power of pardon is confided to the President by the Constitution, and ... the legislative branch of the government cannot impair its force or effect in a judicial proceeding." Klein, 80 U.S. (13 Wall.) at 148.

== Subsequent case law ==
In Robertson v. Seattle Audubon Society, 503 U.S. 429 (1992), environmental groups filed separate lawsuits against the United States Forest Service and alleged that harvesting timber in forests home to an endangered owl violated several federal statutes. While litigation was pending, Congress had passed compromise legislation that prevented harvesting in certain areas, but it also stated, "Congress hereby determines and directs that management [of the forests] according to subsections (b)(3) and (b)(5)... is adequate consideration for the purpose of meeting the statutory requirements that are the basis for [the two cases,]" which were identified by name and caption number. The Court of Appeals held that to be an unconstitutional intrusion on the judiciary's authority, based on Klein because it directed a particular result in both cases. The Supreme Court reversed and upheld the statutes because it found that they had amended the applicable law.

In Bank Markazi v. Peterson, 578 U.S. ___ (2016), the Supreme Court upheld a law that abrogated all defenses of a party (Bank Markazi) in a single case, which was identified by docket number, and directed that if certain criteria relating to ownership of a bank account were met, the money in the account would be used to pay compensation previous awarded by the courts against the bank. The bank argued that the court should rely on Klein to find that Congress had unconstitutionally directed the outcome of the case. The majority opinion found that more recent case law, particularly Robertson v. Seattle Audubon Society, has reduced the precedent value of Klein, but the Court clarified the role that Klein still has in American jurisprudence:

Given the issue before the Court—Presidential pardons Congress sought to nullify by withdrawing federal-court jurisdiction—commentators have rightly read Klein to have at least this contemporary significance: Congress "may not exercise [its authority, including its power to regulate federal jurisdiction,] in a way that requires a federal court to act unconstitutionally." Meltzer, Congress, Courts, and Constitutional Remedies, 86 Geo. L. J. 2537, 2549 (1998). See also Tyler 112 ("Congress may not employ the courts in a way that forces them to become active participants in violating the Constitution.").

— Bank Markazi, 578 U.S. at ___ (2016)(slip op. at 15)(fn. 19)

In Patchak v. Zinke, 138 S. Ct. 897 (2018), the Supreme Court upheld a statute that stripped the federal courts of jurisdiction over claims related to a particular governmental decision to take particular piece of land into trust for the benefit of a Native American Tribe. The result of the statute was to terminate a particular, pending case in favor of the government. There was no majority opinion, but Justice Thomas, for a plurality, opined that Klein did not apply because Congress changed the law, requiring the court to apply the new law to the pending case. The plurality read Congress's power under the Exceptions Clause of the Constitution broadly, suggesting that Congress has nearly unlimited power to strip jurisdiction from the federal courts, even if the result is to terminate a pending case in favor of an identifiable party. In dissent, Chief Justice Roberts opined that not every statutory change "changes the law" within the meaning of Klein and that the Exceptions Clause does not permit Congress to withdraw jurisdiction to intervene in a particular pending case in a way that cuts out the role of the judiciary.
