= George E. Pugh =

American politician

George Ellis Pugh
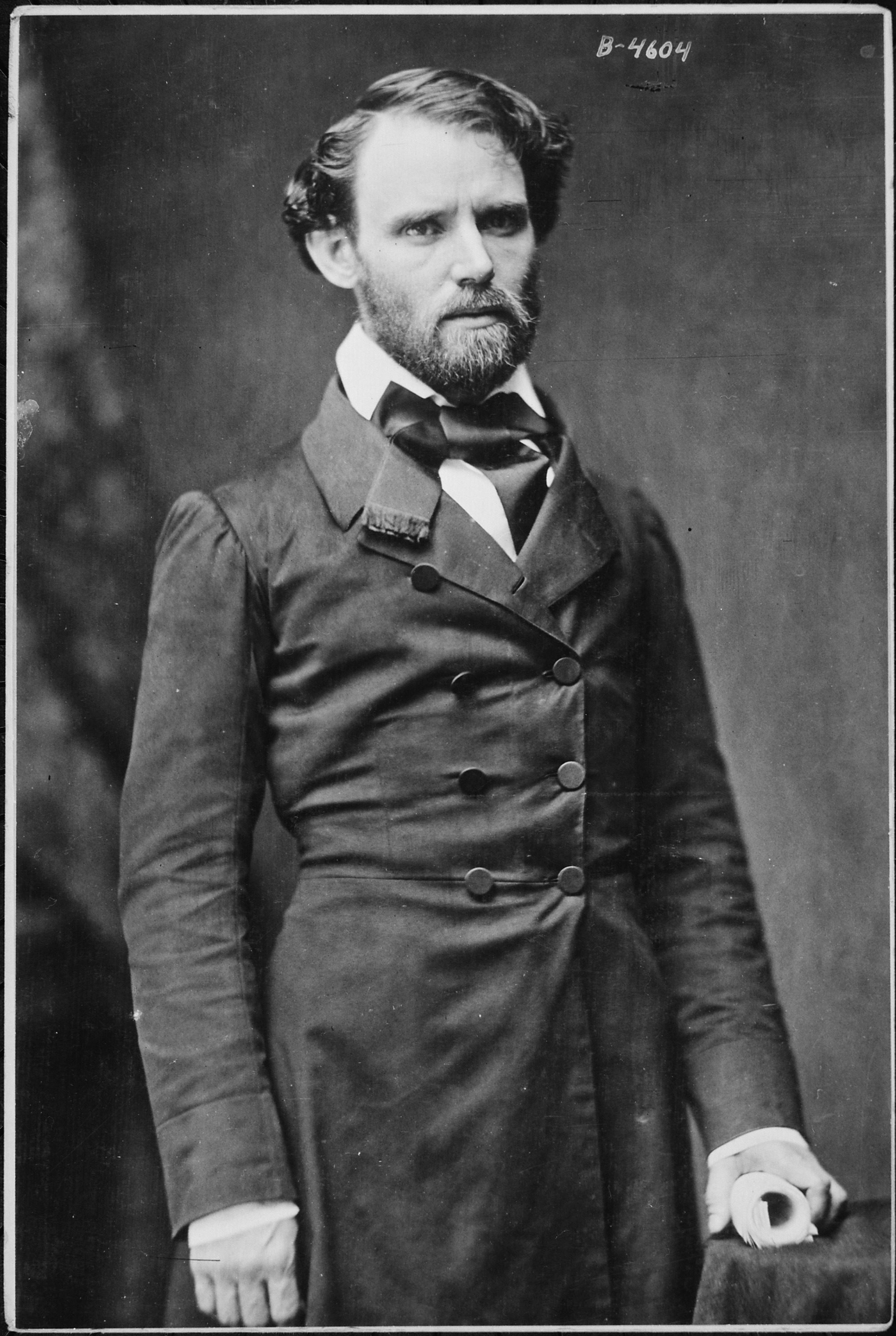

United States Senator from Ohio
- In office March 4, 1855 – March 3, 1861
- Preceded by: Salmon P. Chase
- Succeeded by: Salmon P. Chase

3rd Ohio Attorney General
- In office January 12, 1852 – January 9, 1854
- Governor: Reuben Wood; William Medill
- Preceded by: Joseph McCormick
- Succeeded by: George Wythe McCook

Member of the Ohio House of Representatives from the Hamilton County district
- In office December 4, 1848 – December 1, 1850 Serving with Alexander Long and five others
- Preceded by: four others
- Succeeded by: five others

Personal details
- Born: November 28, 1822 Cincinnati, Ohio
- Died: July 19, 1876 (aged 53) Cincinnati, Ohio
- Resting place: Spring Grove Cemetery
- Party: Democratic
- Spouse: Theresa Chalfant
- Children: three
- Education: Miami University

George Ellis Pugh (November 28, 1822 – July 19, 1876) was a Democratic politician from Ohio. He served in the U.S. Senate from 1855 to 1861.

== Early life ==
Pugh was born in Cincinnati, Ohio. He was the son of Lot and Rachel (née Anthony) Pugh, who were married in Hamilton County, Ohio, on July 7, 1814. George had three brothers and a sister.

George Ellis Pugh descended from Ellis Pugh, Sr. (1656–1718), an early Welsh immigrant to Pennsylvania and Quaker minister who, with his wife Sinah, emigrated to Pennsylvania to escape religious persecution in 1686.

Pugh attended Miami University.

== Career ==
He began practicing law in 1843, later serving as a captain in the 4th Ohio Regiment in the Mexican–American War. He was commended for gallantry and bravery in action at the battle of Atlexco. After serving in the Ohio House of Representatives from 1848 to 1850, he served as State Attorney General from 1852 to 1854. Pugh served a single term in the United States Senate from 1855 to 1861, losing a re-election bid to Salmon P. Chase, whom he had replaced.

In the Senate, he became a champion of the Western Democracy, that is, Midwestern Democrats, first against the Republicans, and later against Stephen A. Douglas' opponents inside the Democratic Party. He spoke in favor of the Lecompton Constitution on March 16, 1858, but followed the instructions of the Ohio legislature in voting against that constitution.

On February 23, 1859, during the lame-duck session, Albert Gallatin Brown attacked Douglas over popular sovereignty. Douglas defended his position, and was joined by Charles E. Stuart of Michigan, David C. Broderick of California, and Pugh. Pugh said, "In the whole Dred Scott case, there was no act of a Territorial legislature before them [the justices] in any shape or form." Pugh explained, "This is the first time I ever heard, in a case where nine judges pronounce their opinions seriatim, that because one of them {Roger B. Taney} in illustration collaterally makes a reference, that becomes the decision of the court." Pugh answered the demand for a federal slave code, to be imposed on all territories, in this way: "Never; while I live, never! I consider it a monstrous demand."

Pugh later had an exchange with Jefferson Davis about the difference, if any, between Douglas' Freeport Doctrine on popular sovereignty and the doctrine Davis had set forth in a speech at Portland, Maine.

Despite his loss to Republican Salmon P. Chase in his attempt to secure a second term to the Senate in 1860, Pugh continued to speak out politically during his remaining time in office. Most notably, during the secession crisis following the election of Abraham Lincoln to the presidency, Pugh was one of the most vocal voices in Congress in arguing against the use of force against the seceding Southern states. After he left the Senate, the leading voices for this position were fellow Ohio Democrats Clement L. Vallandigham and George H. Pendleton in the House of Representatives.

He is best known as a member of the counsel for the defense of Clement L. Vallandigham in 1863. During the Civil War, he fell into disfavor with the citizens of Ohio because he was a Democrat and for defending Vallandigham and later in 1863, he lost the election for the office of Lieutenant Governor. He also lost in the election for Congress in 1864 and refrained from seeking public office for several years while continuing his legal profession.

He emerged to the political front again in 1873 when he was elected to become a delegate to the Ohio State Constitutional Convention but withdrew from the deliberations and declined to serve. He died in Cincinnati in 1876 when he was 53 years old.

Pugh ran for the lieutenant governorship in 1863 and the United States House of Representatives in 1864, losing both times.

== Personal life ==
Pugh married Theresa Chalfant in 1840 and had three children, Robert Chalfont, Nina Theresa and Thomas. He became a Roman Catholic in 1855.

Legal offices
Preceded by Joseph McCormick	Attorney General of Ohio; 1852–54	Succeeded by George Wythe McCook
U.S. Senate
Preceded by Salmon P. Chase	U.S. senator (Class 3) from Ohio; 1855–61; Served alongside: Benjamin F. Wade	Succeeded by Salmon P. Chase
