= Joseph McCormick (Ohio lawyer) =

American politician

2nd Ohio Attorney General
- In office 1851–1852
- Governor: Reuben Wood
- Preceded by: Henry Stanbery
- Succeeded by: George Ellis Pugh

Personal details
- Born: 1814 Cincinnati, Ohio
- Died: 1879 (aged 64–65) California
- Party: Democratic
- Spouse: Elizabeth Smith

Joseph McCormick (1814 – 1879) was a Democratic lawyer in the U.S. state of Ohio who participated in the second State Constitutional Convention and was Ohio Attorney General for a few months 1851–1852.

== Biography ==
Joseph McCormick was born in 1814 in Cincinnati, Ohio, the only child of Adam McCormick and his wife Margaret Ellison. He lived as a child in Cincinnati and West Union. He may have attended Marietta College of Ohio. In 1831 and 1832, he was in Pine Grove Furnace, Ohio as a storekeeper. He studied law under Nelson Barrere and was admitted to the bar in 1835. He located in Portsmouth for a few months, and then in Cincinnati until 1838.

In 1838, McCormick became Prosecuting Attorney of Adams County. Again in 1843, first by appointment, and then by election, was again prosecutor until 1845. On May 20, 1840, he was married to Elizabeth Smith, sister of Judge John M. Smith of West Union. They had two sons and one daughter, but only Adam Ellison, born 1843, survived to adulthood.

Joseph McCormick was an alcoholic, and, when his father died in 1849, he left a large estate. He left a life estate to Joseph, with the remainder to the two grandchildren then alive. He directed the trustee of the estate to turn over the entire estate to Joseph should he reform his drinking habit. The estate was held in trust until Joseph's death, when it was turned over to his son.

McCormick was elected from Adams County to the second Ohio Constitutional Convention in 1850. On May 5, 1851, he was appointed by Governor Reuben Wood as the second Ohio Attorney General, to replace Henry Stanbery, whose term had expired. He served about seven months, until George E. Pugh, who was elected under the new constitution, assumed the office.

In about 1857, McCormick went to California, where he died in 1879. His wife and son remained in Manchester from 1857 until her death in 1872.

Legal offices
Preceded by Henry Stanbery	Attorney General of Ohio; 1851–1852	Succeeded by George Ellis Pugh
