= Georgia v. Stanton =

- Supreme Court of the United States

Decided February 10, 1868
- Full case name: Georgia, Florida, and Alabama v. Stanton, Secretary of War; Grant, General of the Army, and Pope, Major-General, assigned to the command of the Third Military District
- Citations: 73 U.S. 50 (more) 6 Wall. 50; 18 L. Ed. 721

Holding
- The Supreme Court lacks jurisdiction over federal government action under the Reconstruction Acts.

Court membership
- Chief Justice Salmon P. Chase Associate Justices Samuel Nelson · Robert C. Grier; Nathan Clifford · Noah H. Swayne; Samuel F. Miller · David Davis; Stephen J. Field

Case opinions
- Majority: Nelson, joined by Grier, Clifford, Swayne, Miller, Davis, Field
- Concurrence: Chase

Georgia v. Stanton, 73 U.S. (6 Wall.) 50 (1868), also called the Library Case, was a case in which the Supreme Court of the United States held that the court does not hold jurisdiction over the political question of enforcement of the Reconstruction Acts against the Southern States. The court did recognize its original jurisdiction in the matter and its ability to decide issues of the rights of persons or property. Nevertheless, the case before it was not one of persons or property, but the political question of whether the federal government could annul state governments and replace them with new ones. Since it found that the issue raised by the three Southern States was a political one, the court decided it did not possess jurisdiction over the subject matter of the case.

== Background ==
In an attempt to prevent the enforcement of the Reconstruction Acts following the civil war, the state of Georgia filed suit against the Secretary of War and two of his generals. "The case arose under the Court's original jurisdiction."

== See also ==
- List of United States Supreme Court cases, volume 73
