= Judicial Circuits Act =

Judicial Circuits Act of 1866
- Long title: An Act to fix the Number of Judges of the Supreme Court of the United States, and to change certain Judicial Circuits.
- Enacted by: the 39th United States Congress
- Effective: July 23, 1866

Citations
- Statutes at Large: 14 Stat. 209

Codification
- Acts amended: Judiciary Act of 1789; Judiciary Act of 1863

Legislative history
- Introduced in the House as H.R. 334 by James F. Wilson on April 9, 1866; Committee consideration by House Committee on the Judiciary; Passed the House on June 13, 1866; Passed the Senate on July 10, 1866; Signed into law by President Andrew Johnson on July 23, 1866

The Judicial Circuits Act of 1866 (ch. 210, 14 Stat. 209) reorganized the United States circuit courts and provided for the gradual elimination of several seats on the Supreme Court of the United States. It was signed into law on July 23, 1866, by President Andrew Johnson. It in effect denied him the opportunity of appointing any justices to the Supreme Court.

The act redrew the boundaries of the judicial circuits and reduced the number of circuits from ten to nine. It also provided for the gradual reduction in the number of seats on the Supreme Court from the ten that had been authorized in 1863 to seven and established in large measure the geographical outlines of the circuits ever since.

Be it enacted by the Senate and House of Representatives of the United States of America in Congress assembled, That no vacancy in the office of associate justice of the supreme court shall be filled by appointment until the number of associate justices shall be reduced to six; and thereafter the said supreme court shall consist of a chief justice of the United States and six associate justices, any four of whom shall be a quorum; and the said court shall hold one term annually at the seat of government, and such adjourned or special terms as it may find necessary for the despatch of business. (bold added)

— Judicial Circuits Act, 1866

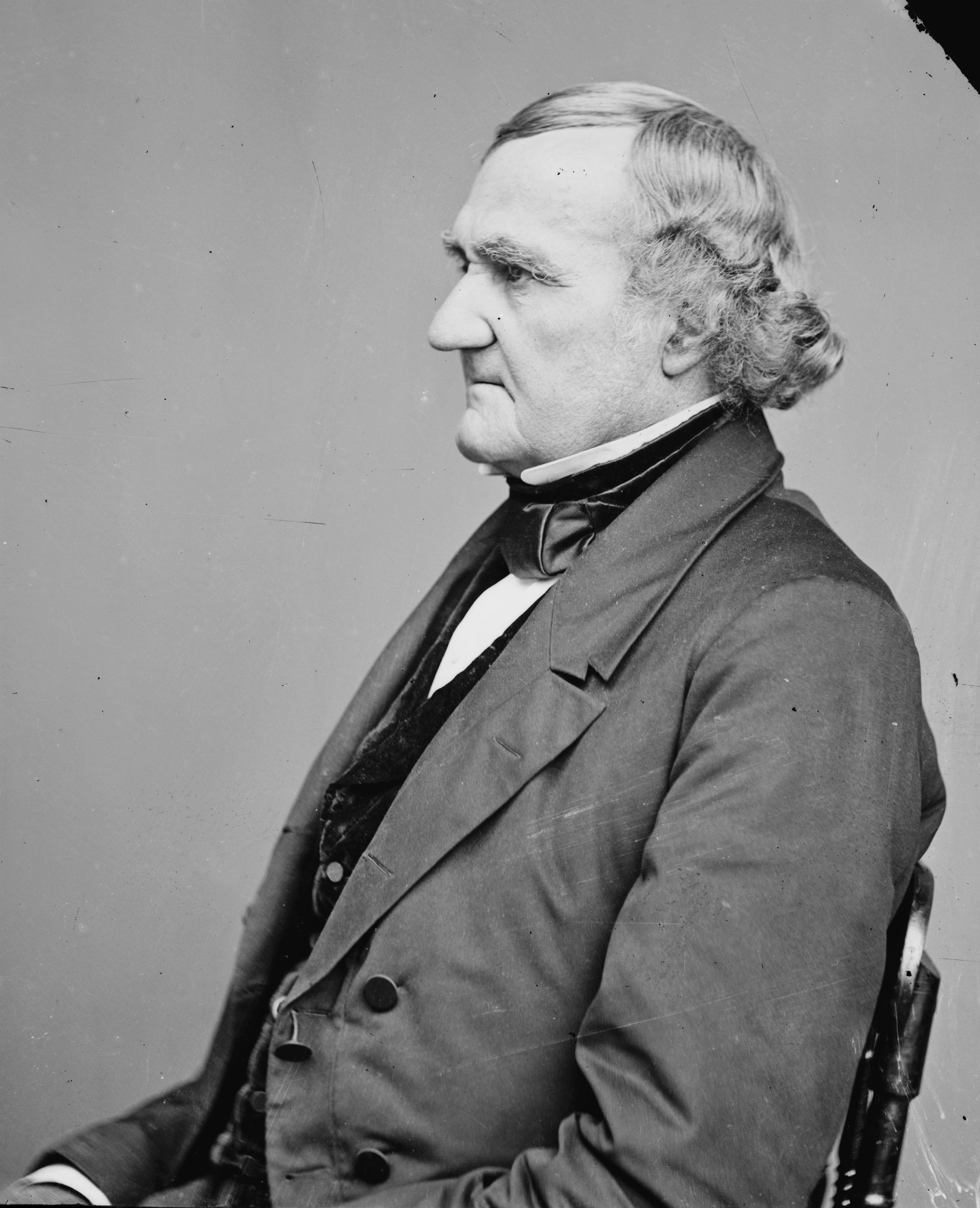
After John Catron's death, the Judicial Circuits Act reduced the Supreme Court's size to nine

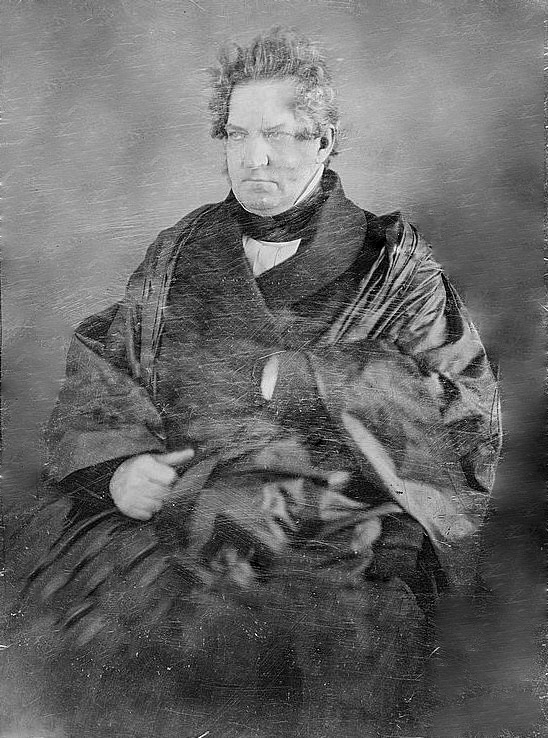
James Moore Wayne's death in 1867 reduced the Supreme Court's size to eight

One of the ten seats (that of John Catron) was already vacant and became abolished; a second seat (that of James Moore Wayne) became abolished in 1867. Before a third seat could become abolished, the Judicial Circuits Act was superseded by the Judiciary Act of 1869, which increased the number of Supreme Court seats to nine.

The subsequent stability in circuit organization ended a period of frequent rearrangement of the states within the circuits. After establishing nine circuits in 1837, Congress in 1842 shifted several southern states to accommodate transportation routes used by the justices when traveling on circuit. In 1862 Congress incorporated six additional states into a restructured system of nine circuits, and within another year had abolished the California Circuit, placed California and Oregon in a Tenth Circuit, and reorganized the mid-western states. The 1866 act ended a period in which the arrangement of the states into circuits was periodically reorganized. Since then, the geographical outline of the circuits has only been altered by the addition of new states to circuits and the division of two large circuits in the twentieth century.

The geographical reorganization of the circuits in 1866 coincided with the broader effort of the Republican majority in Congress to reduce what it considered the disproportionate influence enjoyed by the southern states before the Civil War. Between 1837 and 1862, five of the nine circuits comprised exclusively slave states. The tradition of appointing a justice from each circuit allowed supporters of slavery to dominate the Supreme Court. After reducing the number of all-southern circuits in 1862, Congress in 1866 left only two circuits that comprised only former slave states, and only one that comprised only former Confederate states.

The reduction in the size of the Supreme Court nullified President Johnson's pending nomination of Henry Stanbery to the tenth seat on the court and prevented Johnson from appointing a justice during the remainder of his term. The legislation owed less to the Republican opposition to Johnson, who signed the act, than to the efforts of Chief Justice Salmon P. Chase. The first draft of the bill proposed a return to nine justices, preventing tie votes on the court and providing a justice for each circuit. In communication with influential members of Congress and fellow justices, Chase privately urged a further reduction in the number of seats in hopes of winning approval for an increase in the justices' salaries. This effort failed, however, as Congress did not approve an increase in judicial salaries until 1871, after it had returned the size of the court to nine seats.
