= William Strong (Supreme Court justice) =

US Supreme Court justice from 1870 to 1880

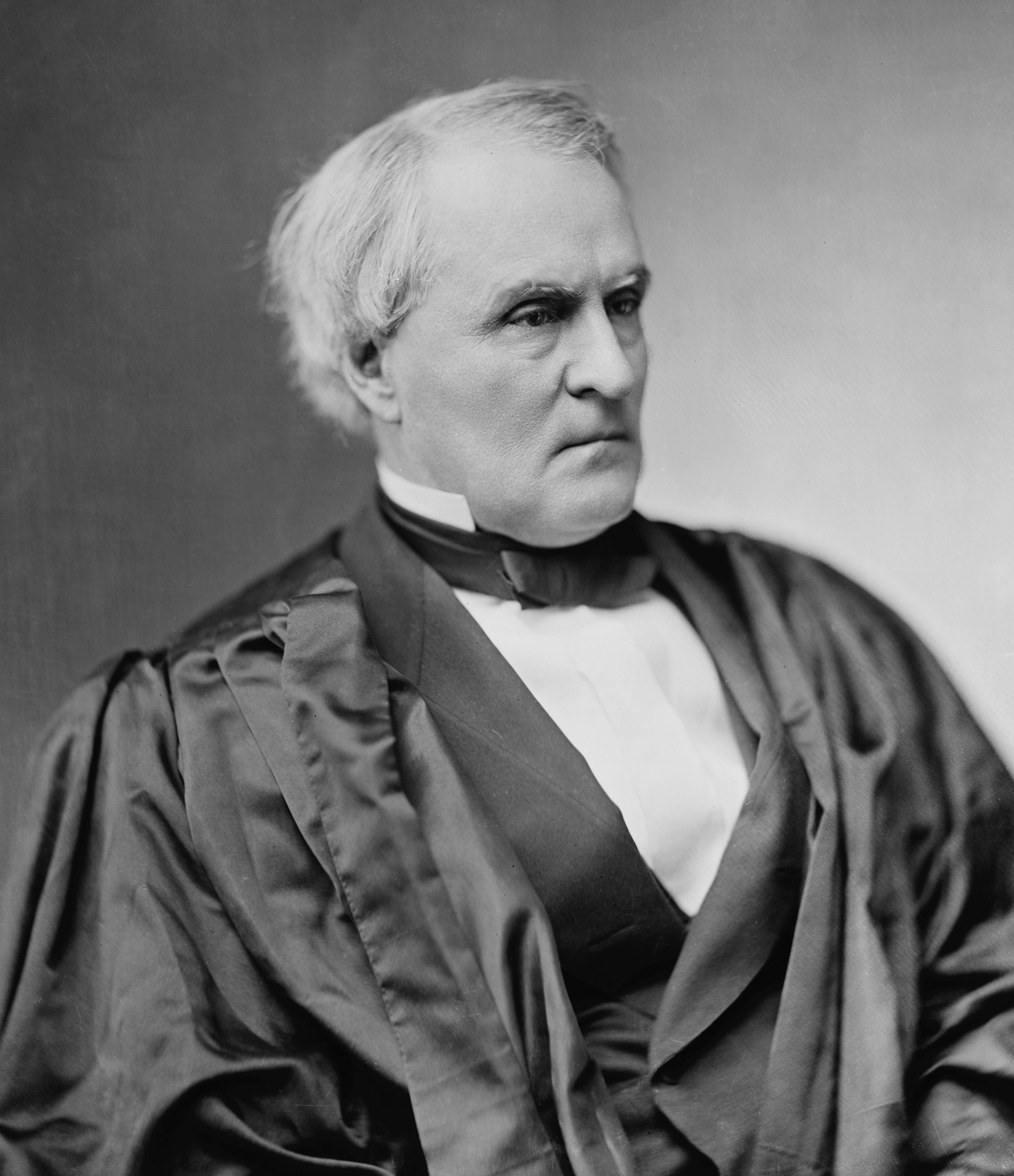
- Strong, 1865–1880

Associate Justice of the Supreme Court of the United States
- In office March 14, 1870 – December 14, 1880
- Nominated by: Ulysses S. Grant
- Preceded by: Robert Cooper Grier
- Succeeded by: William Burnham Woods

Member of the U.S. House of Representatives from Pennsylvania's 9th district
- In office March 4, 1847 – March 3, 1851
- Preceded by: John Ritter
- Succeeded by: Glancy Jones

Personal details
- Born: May 6, 1808 Somers, Connecticut, U.S.
- Died: August 19, 1895 (aged 87) Lake Minnewaska, New York, U.S.
- Resting place: Charles Evans Cemetery
- Party: Democratic (Before 1868); Republican (1868–1895)
- Education: Yale University (BA, MA)

William Strong (May 6, 1808 – August 19, 1895) was an American lawyer, jurist, and politician who served as an associate justice of the Supreme Court of the United States from 1870 to 1880, writing majority opinions in landmark cases like Strauder v. West Virginia. Strong previously served as a U.S. representative from Pennsylvania from 1847 to 1851 and as a justice of the Supreme Court of Pennsylvania from 1857 to 1868. He also served on the commission that adjudicated the disputed presidential election of 1876.

== Early life ==
Strong was born in Somers, Connecticut and later moved to Pennsylvania. He was the eldest of eleven children of William Lightbourn Strong, a descendant of Elder John Strong and Harriet (Deming) Strong. He was the brother of Newton Deming Strong and the cousin of U.S. Representative Theron Rudd Strong of New York. William Strong attended the Monson Academy in Massachusetts, and graduated from Yale University in 1828, where he was a member of Brothers in Unity and Phi Beta Kappa. He taught school in Burlington, New Jersey while studying law with Garret D. Wall, and then completed his legal education with a six-month course at Yale Law School. After being admitted to the bar Strong started a legal practice in Reading, Pennsylvania, remaining in practice from 1832 to 1857. He was elected as a member of the American Philosophical Society in 1866.

== House of Representatives ==
In 1846, Strong was elected to the United States House of Representatives as an abolitionist Democrat. Strong served two terms in the House, and was the chairman of the U.S. House Committee on Elections during his second term. He did not seek reelection in 1850, but returned to private practice.

== Judicial service ==
=== Supreme Court of Pennsylvania ===
Strong was elected to the Supreme Court of Pennsylvania in 1857 as a Democrat, succeeding James Armstrong, who had been temporarily appointed to the seat. Strong switched to the Republican Party soon after taking the bench. He resigned from the court in 1868 to return to a lucrative private practice in Philadelphia.

=== United States Supreme Court ===
In December 1869, Justice Robert C. Grier announced his intention to retire from the United States Supreme Court effective February 1, 1870. President Ulysses S. Grant was heavily lobbied to nominate former Secretary of War Edwin Stanton. Stanton was nominated, and confirmed by the United States Senate on December 20, 1869, but he died just four days later without having served on the Court. After Grier retired, Grant nominated Strong to succeed him. He was confirmed by the Senate on February 18, 1870, and was sworn in on March 14, 1870.

Strong ruled for states rights and against the Civil Rights Act of 1866, which had allowed African Americans to testify against Whites, in Blyew v. United States. In United States v. Given, 25 F. Cas. 1324 (C.C.D. Del. 1873), Strong, riding on circuit, upheld an indictment under the Enforcement Act of 1870 when election officials prevented black Americans from voting. Strong held that the Reconstruction Amendments allowed Congress to enact legislation punishing private individuals when a state failed to protect constitutional rights. Strong wrote the opinion for an early equal protection case in Strauder v. West Virginia, 100 U.S. 303 (1879).

==== 1876 election ====
Strong was one of five Supreme Court justices who sat on the Electoral Commission that was convened to resolve the disputed electoral votes in the U.S. presidential election of 1876. Strong voted along with his fellow Republicans, who held the majority on the Commission, to award every disputed vote to Rutherford B. Hayes, the Republican candidate, thus ensuring his presidency.

Strong served on the Supreme Court until December 14, 1880, when he retired despite still being in good health, partly to set an example for several infirm justices who refused to give up their seats. He resumed the practice of law and pursued religious causes until his death, at Lake Minnewaska in Ulster County, New York, on August 19, 1895. Following funeral services at the chapel of the Charles Evans Cemetery in Reading, Pennsylvania, he was laid to rest at that cemetery. The Historical Society of Berks County has in its collection a few pieces relating to Justice Strong.

=== International arbitration ===
After his retirement from the Supreme Court, Strong served as an arbitrator for an international dispute between Haiti and the United States, according to a 1884 agreement between the two nations. Two American citizens claimed damages due to the conduct of the Haitian government. He issued his award on June 13, 1885.

== National Reform Association ==
While serving as an associate justice, Strong presided over the National Reform Association from 1868 to 1873. In this capacity, he advocated for the formal establishment of the United States as a Christian nation and campaigned for a sixteenth amendment to the U.S. Constitution. This proposed amendment sought to incorporate references to God and Jesus Christ into the preamble. In 1872, Strong assisted Anthony Comstock and Cephas Brainerd in refining and strengthening the legislative language of what would become the Comstock Act of 1873. This federal anti-obscenity statute criminalized the use of the U.S. Postal Service to distribute "obscene, lewd, or lascivious" materials, explicitly prohibiting the mailing of contraceptives, abortifacients, and information regarding birth control or abortion.

== Personal ==
Justice William Strong's grandson, Lieutenant William N. Strong, Jr. (1887-1919), of Washington, DC, served in the Canadian Army during World War I, enlisting in January 1915. He was gassed on the battlefield of Ypres, and in the Battle of Vimy Ridge in 1917. He died in Pasadena, California of complications from the gassing. The Washington Post describes him as the first Washingtonian to join the Allies.

== See also ==
- List of justices of the Supreme Court of the United States

== Sources ==
- "William Strong". Biographical Directory of the United States Congress.
- The Political Graveyard

U.S. House of Representatives
Preceded by John Ritter	Member of the U.S. House of Representatives from Pennsylvania's 9th congressional district 1847–1851	Succeeded by Glancy Jones
Preceded by Robert Grier	Chair of the House Elections Committee; 1849–1851	Succeeded by Richard Thompson
Legal offices
Preceded by Robert Grier	Associate Justice of the Supreme Court of the United States; 1870–1880	Succeeded by William Woods
