= Stephen Johnson Field =

US Supreme Court justice from 1863 to 1897

- Field, c. 1875

Associate Justice of the Supreme Court of the United States
- In office May 20, 1863 – December 1, 1897
- Nominated by: Abraham Lincoln
- Preceded by: Seat established
- Succeeded by: Joseph McKenna

5th Chief Justice of the Supreme Court of California
- In office September 12, 1859 – May 20, 1863
- Nominated by: John B. Weller
- Preceded by: David S. Terry
- Succeeded by: Warner Cope

Associate Justice of the Supreme Court of California
- In office October 13, 1857 – September 12, 1859
- Nominated by: J. Neely Johnson
- Preceded by: Hugh Murray
- Succeeded by: Edwin B. Crocker

Member of the California State Assembly from the 14th district
- In office January 6, 1851 – January 5, 1852
- Preceded by: Constituency established
- Succeeded by: A. G. Caldwell

Personal details
- Born: November 4, 1816 Haddam, Connecticut, U.S.
- Died: April 9, 1899 (aged 82) Washington, D.C., U.S.
- Resting place: Rock Creek Cemetery; Washington, D.C., U.S.
- Party: Democratic
- Spouse: Sue Virginia Swearingen (m. 1859)
- Education: Williams College (BA)

Stephen Johnson Field (November 4, 1816 – April 9, 1899) was an American jurist. He was an Associate Justice of the United States Supreme Court from 1863 to 1897, and prior to that, he was the fifth Chief Justice of California. He had the third-longest tenure of any U.S. Supreme Court justice and is the only one to have served contemporaneously with a relative: his nephew, David J. Brewer.

== Early life and education ==
An early daguerreotype of Field, possibly by Alexander Gardner

Born in Haddam, Connecticut, he was the sixth of the nine children of David Dudley Field I, a Congregationalist minister, and his wife Submit Dickinson, a teacher. His family produced three other children of major prominence in 19th century America: David Dudley Field II the prominent attorney, Cyrus Field, the millionaire investor and creator of the Atlantic Cable, and Rev. Henry Martyn Field, a prominent clergyman and travel writer. He grew up in Stockbridge, Massachusetts, and went to Turkey at thirteen with his sister Emilia and her missionary husband, Rev. Josiah Brewer. He received a B.A. from Williams College, Williamstown, Massachusetts, in 1837. While attending Williams College he was one of the original Founders of the Delta Upsilon fraternity. After reading law in Albany with Harmanus Bleecker and New York City with his brother David, Stephen was admitted to the bar. He practiced law with David until 1848, when he went to California during the Gold Rush.

Field was an uncle of future Associate Justice David Josiah Brewer. Other notable relatives include Paul Stephen Field and legal scholar Anne Field.

== Career in California politics and law ==
In California, Field's legal practice boomed and he was elected alcalde, a form of mayor and justice of the peace under the old Mexican rule of law, of Marysville (curiously, he was elected Alcalde just three days after his arrival in Marysville). He appointed George Congdon Gorham his clerk, and the two became lifelong friends. Because the Gold Rush city could not afford a jail, and it cost too much to transport prisoners to San Francisco, Field implemented the whipping post, believing that without such a brutal implement many in the rough and tumble city would be hanged for minor crimes. The voters sent him to the California State Assembly in 1850 to represent Yuba County, but he lost a race the next year for the State Senate. His successful legal practice led to his election to the California Supreme Court in 1857, serving six years.

While serving on the California Supreme Court, Field had a special coat made with pockets large enough to hold two pistols so that he could fire the weapons inside the pockets. In 1858, he was challenged to a duel by fellow Judge William T. Barbour (who accused Field of being behind an offensive article written by Gorham), but at the dueling ground, neither man fired his gun.

In 1859, Field replaced the David S. Terry as chief justice of the California Supreme Court. Terry resigned from the court the day before he killed a U.S. Senator David Colbreth Broderick in a duel. Field and Terry's paths crossed again 30 years later when Field, acting in his capacity as a circuit judge of the 9th Federal Circuit Court, ruled against Terry in a convoluted divorce case (and had him sent to jail for contempt of court as well). Seeking revenge, Terry attempted to kill Field in 1889 near Stockton, California, but was instead shot dead by Field's bodyguard, U.S. Marshal David B. Neagle. Legal issues arising from the killing of Terry came before the Supreme Court in the 1890 habeas corpus case of In re Neagle. The Court ruled the United States Attorney General had authority to appoint U.S. Marshals as bodyguards to Supreme Court justices and Marshal Neagle had acted within the scope of his authority in shooting Terry. Field recused himself from the case.

Field was determined and vengeful when others disagreed with him, and he easily made enemies. An opponent of his wrote that Field's life would be "found to be one series of little-mindedness, meanlinesses, of braggadocio, pusillanimity, and contemptible vanity."

== U.S. Supreme Court justice ==
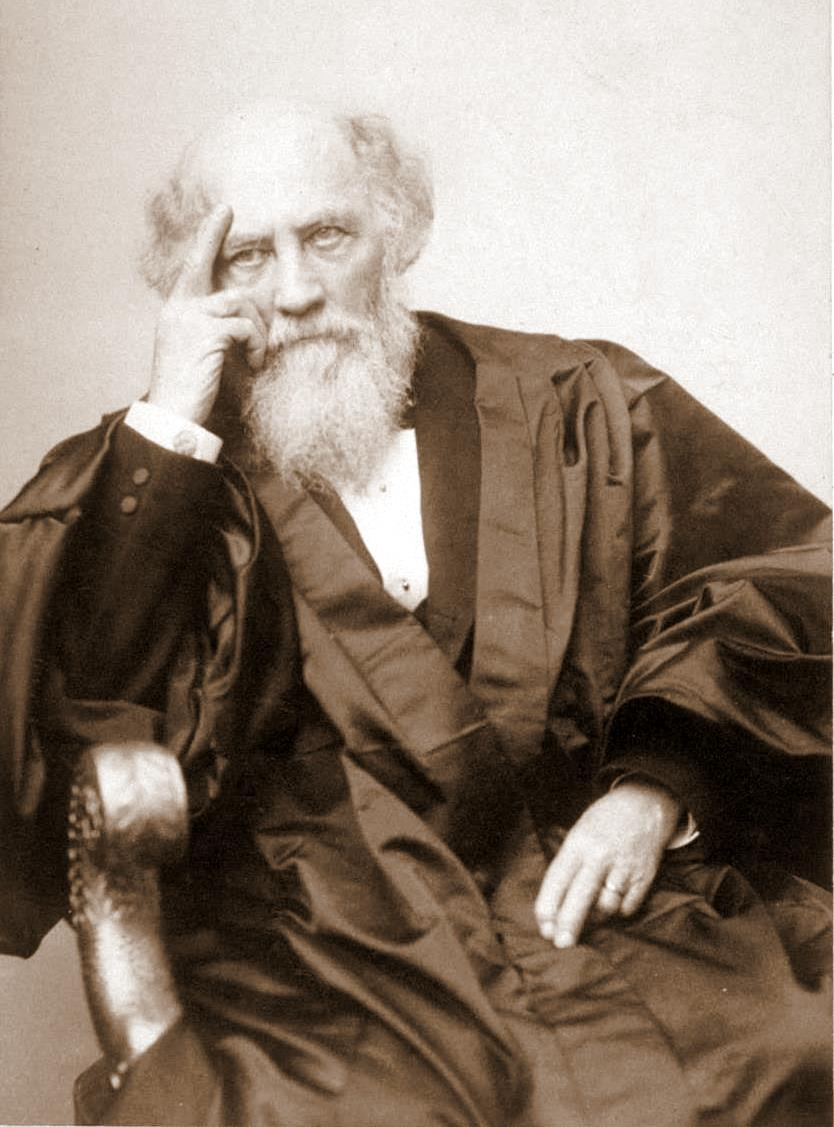
Stephen Johnson Field

The number of seats on the United States Supreme Court was expanded from nine to ten in March 1863, as a result of the Tenth Circuit Act. This gave President Abraham Lincoln an opportunity to nominate a new associate justice, which he did on March 6, 1863. Seeking to effect both a regional and political balance on the Court, Lincoln selected Field, a westerner and Unionist Democrat. Field was confirmed by the United States Senate on March 10, 1863, and took the judicial oath of office on May 20, 1863.

Field insisted on breaking John Marshall's record of 34 years on the court, even when he was no longer able to handle the workload. His colleagues asked him to resign due to him being intermittently senile, but he refused; at one point John Marshall Harlan urged Field to retire, reminding Field that he had been part of a committee to urge Justice Robert Grier to retire. Finding Field dozing in the robing room, Harlan later related what happened next: “The old man listened, gradually became alert, and finally, with his eyes blazing with the fire of youth, he burst out, ‘Yes, and a dirtier day’s work I never did in my life.'”

In March 1896, he wrote what would be his final opinion on behalf of the Court, but remained on the bench for another twenty months, finally retiring on December 1, 1897. Field would become the last veteran of both the Taney Court and the Chase Court to remain on the bench. He would remain the longest serving member of the Court until his record was surpassed by William O. Douglas, who served from 1939 to 1975.

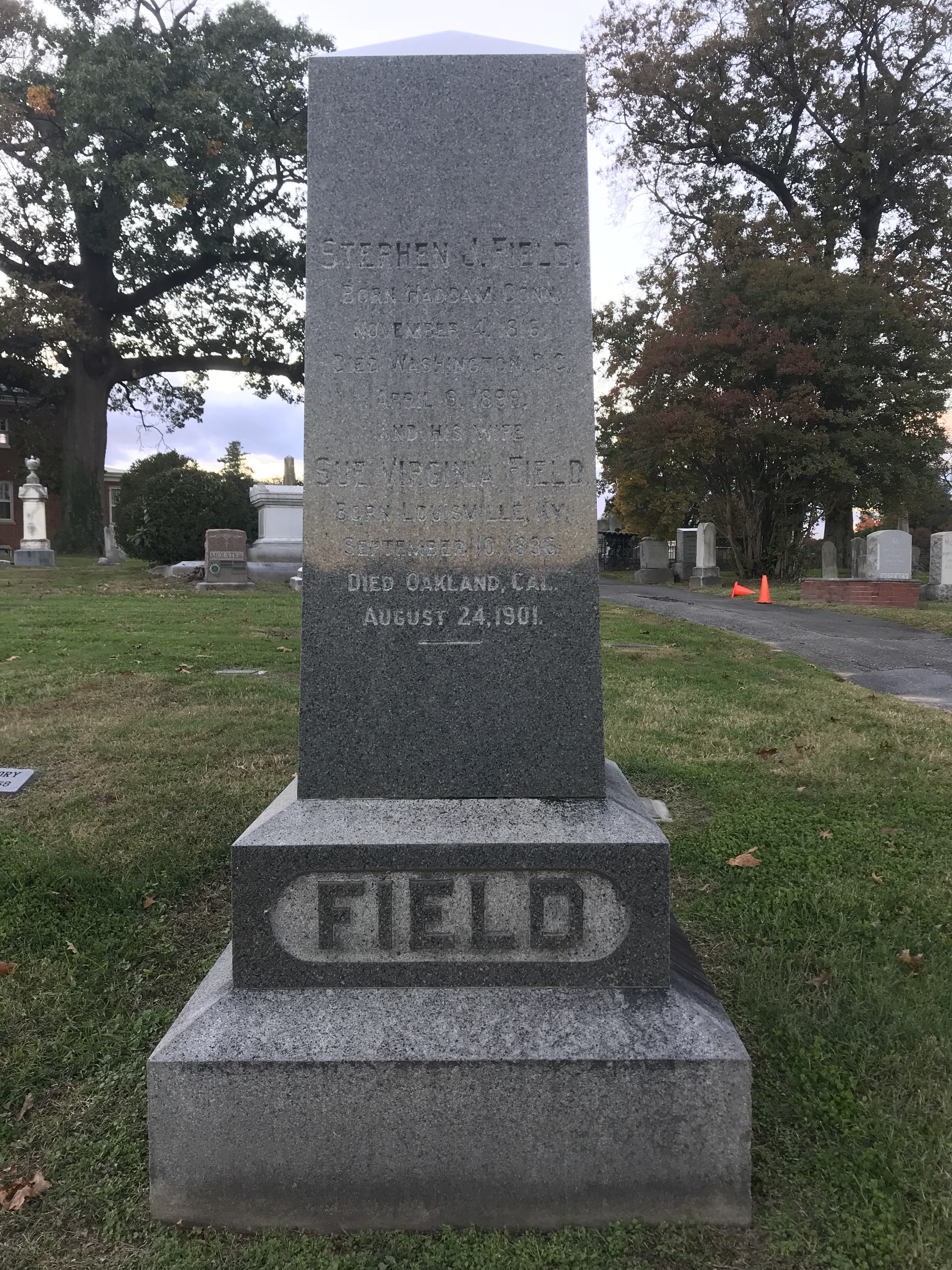
Field's gravesite

He died in Washington, D.C., on April 9, 1899, and was buried there in the Rock Creek Cemetery.

== Jurisprudence ==
Field wrote 544 opinions, more than any other justice save for Samuel Miller, John P. Stevens, and Clarence Thomas (by comparison, Chief Justice Marshall wrote 508 opinions in his 34 years on the court). According to journalist Brian Doherty, "Field was one of the pioneers of the concept (beloved by many libertarian legal thinkers) of substantive due process – the notion that the due process protected by the Fourteenth Amendment applied not merely to procedures but to the substance of laws as well." Field's vocal advocacy of substantive due process was illustrated in his dissents to the Slaughter-House Cases (1873) and Munn v. Illinois (1877). In the Slaughter-House Cases, Justice Field's dissent focused on the Privileges or Immunities clause, not the Due Process clause (which was important in the dissent of Justice Bradley as well as the dissent of Justice Swayne). In both Munn and Mugler v. Kansas (1887), Justice Field based his dissent on the protection of property interests by the Due Process clause. One of Field's most notable opinions was his majority opinion in Pennoyer v. Neff (1878), which set the standard on personal jurisdiction for the next 100 years. His views on due process were eventually adopted by the court's majority after he left the Supreme Court. In other cases he helped end the income tax (Pollock v. Farmers' Loan and Trust Company (1895)) and limit antitrust law (United States v. E.C. Knight Company (1895)). He also joined the majority in Plessy v. Ferguson (1896) that upheld racial segregation. Field dissented in Strauder v. West Virginia (1880), where the majority opinion held that the exclusion of African-Americans from juries violated the Fourteenth Amendment's Equal Protection Clause. Field's most notable contribution to Equal Protection Clause jurisprudence was in 1888, with Pembina Consolidated Silver Mining Co. v. Pennsylvania, where he wrote for the majority in holding that the Equal Protection Clause recognizes the personhood of legal entities.

"Judge Righteous Judgement," a caricature of Field published in The Wasp following his ruling against the Pigtail Ordinance, August 9, 1879

In addition to his direct work on the Supreme Court of the United States, Field also wrote notable opinions, mainly concerning Chinese immigrants, while he sat by designation on federal trial courts in California. In an 1879 ruling, Ho Ah Kow v. Nunan, Field invalidated the colloquially termed "Pigtail Ordinance," a prison sanitation measure that, although facially neutral, was in practice applied as a means of humiliating Chinese persons, for which Field received criticism in the Californian press as a result of his ruling. In an 1884 ruling, In re Look Tin Sing, Field held that birthright citizenship under the Fourteenth Amendment did not depend upon the ancestry of a person's parents or those parents' eligibility for naturalization. Field's views towards immigration later shifted and he wrote the majority opinion in Chae Chan Ping v. United States (1889), which upheld a piece of follow-up legislation to the Chinese Exclusion Act.

=== Academic work ===
In November 1885, Field served as an original trustee of Stanford University.

== See also ==
- Juristic person (Corporate personhood)
- Demographics of the Supreme Court of the United States
- List of justices of the Supreme Court of the United States
- List of United States Supreme Court cases by the Chase Court
- List of United States Supreme Court cases by the Fuller Court
- List of United States Supreme Court cases by the Taney Court
- List of United States Supreme Court cases by the Waite Court
- List of justices of the Supreme Court of California
- List of United States federal judges by longevity of service

California Assembly
New constituency	Member of the California State Assembly from the 14th district 1851–1852	Succeeded by A. G. Caldwell
Legal offices
Preceded by David Terry	Chief Justice of California; 1859–1863	Succeeded by Warner Cope
New seat	Associate Justice of the Supreme Court of the United States; 1863–1897	Succeeded by Joseph McKenna
