= Willard v. Tayloe =

- Supreme Court of the United States
- Full case name: Willard v. Tayloe
- Citations: 75 U.S. 557 (more) 8 Wall. 557; 19 L. Ed. 501

Case history
- Prior: On appeal from the Supreme Court of the District of Columbia

Case opinions
- Majority: Field, joined by Grier, Clifford, Swayne, Miller, Davis
- Concurrence: Chase, Nelson

Willard v. Tayloe, 75 U.S. (8 Wall.) 557 (1869), was a decision by the Supreme Court of the United States that courts of equity deciding issues of contract have discretion to determine the form of relief based on the circumstances of each individual case. The Court established a new rule to determine the form of relief: Relief should serve the ends of justice, and should be withheld if it appears likely to produce hardship or injustice to either party.

In the case, the Court held that plaintiff Henry Willard had not acted in bad faith by tendering United States Notes as down payment for the sale of property, even though the contract in question specified payment in gold or silver coin. Nonetheless, the contract specified payment in coin, and payment in coin must be made. The Court also held that fluctuations in the price of the property between the date on which the contract was agreed and the date the down payment was made do not create issues of equity.

== Background ==
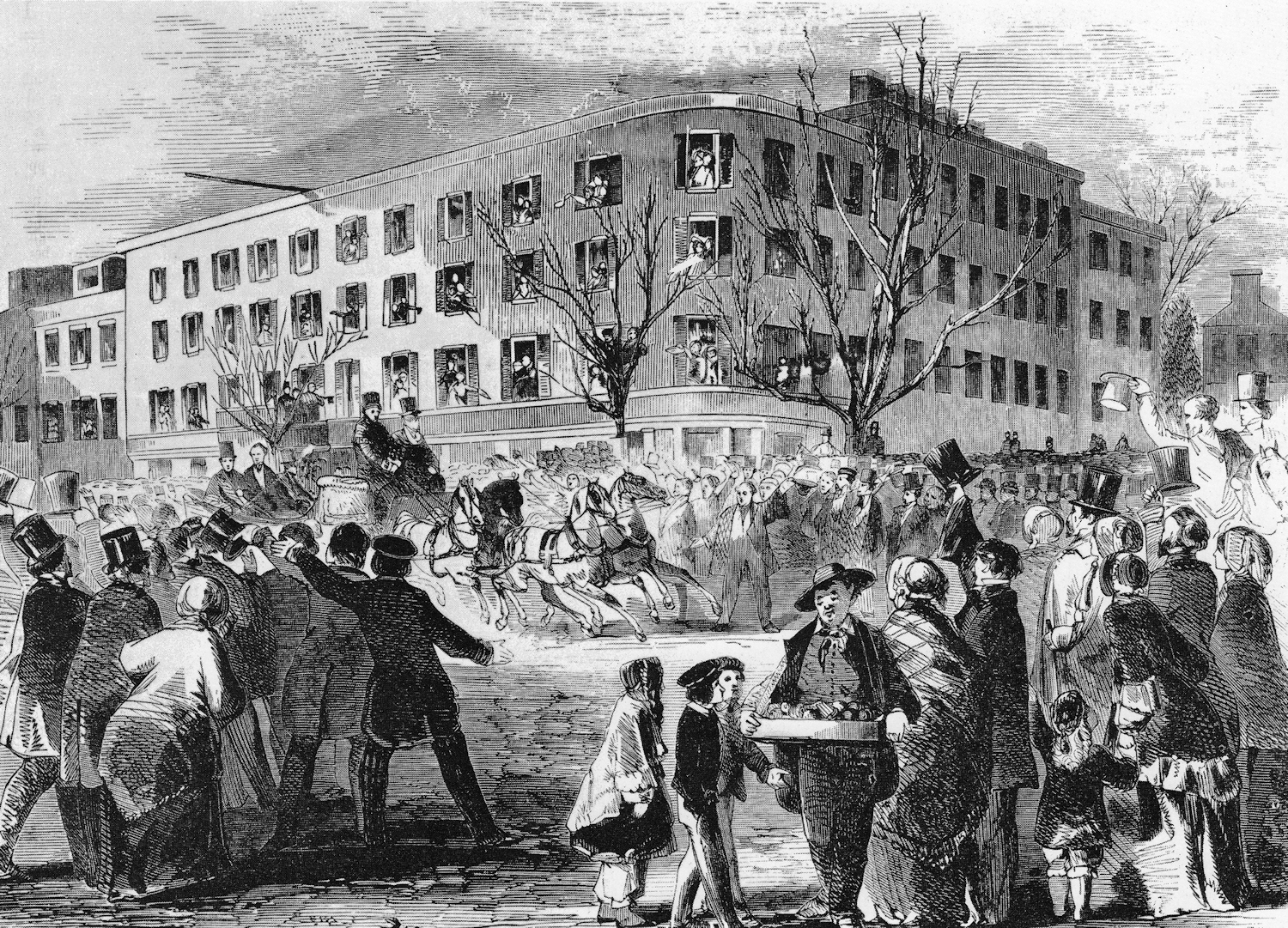
An 1853 engraving depicting President Franklin Pierce leaving the Willard Hotel.

Colonel John Tayloe III built six two-story row houses facing Pennsylvania Avenue at 14th Street NW in the city of Washington, D.C., in 1816. Col. Tayloe leased them in 1817 to John Tennison, who turned them into a hotel under the name "Tennison's Hotel". The structures served as a hotel for the next three decades, the leaseholder and name changing several times: Williamson's Mansion Hotel, Fullers American House, and the City Hotel.

Col. Tayloe died on March 23, 1828, and his son, Benjamin Ogle Tayloe, inherited the property. Mr. Tayloe renovated the properties in 1843 and 1844. But by 1847 the structures were in disrepair and he was eager to find a tenant who would maintain them and run the enterprise profitably.

A chance encounter led to a new lease and the eventual sale of the property. Tayloe had become engaged to Phoebe Warren, a wealthy young woman from Troy, New York. Miss Warren was traveling on the steamer Niagara (a vessel which traveled up and down the Hudson River) when she met Henry Willard, a Chief Steward aboard the vessel. Warren was so impressed with the way Willard handled the ship's and passengers' needs that she recommended him to her fiancé. Willard visited Washington, D.C., in October 1847 to meet with Tayloe, who subsequently leased the six buildings to him for use as a hotel. Willard combined the six structures into one building in 1850, added two additional stories, and called the new business the Willard Hotel.

In 1854, Tayloe leased the property again to Willard, this time for 10 years at a rate of $1,200 per year. The lease contained a provision that Willard could purchase the entire property at any time during the life of the lease for $22,500—$2,000 in "cash" down payment and another $2,000 a year (plus interest) thereafter until the mortgage was paid. During the lease, the American Civil War broke out and property values in Washington, D.C., skyrocketed. Nearly all Northern banks suspended the use of specie (money backed by gold deposits) due to bank runs, and the federal government followed suit shortly thereafter. In 1863, Congress passed the National Banking Act, which authorized the federal government to issue United States Notes (paper money) rather than coins made of gold or silver. The U.S. Notes were not convertible into gold, and quickly depreciated in value.

On April 15, 1864, two weeks before the lease was due to expire, Willard tendered the down payment to Tayloe in paper money. Tayloe refused to issue the mortgage and turn over the deed, claiming that the hotel was now worth much more than $22,500 and that Willard had not paid in gold (the only form of cash available in 1854) as specified in the lease. Worse, due to inflation, the Notes were worth only about half what gold specie was worth. Willard sued for relief.

The Supreme Court of the District of Columbia held in favor of Tayloe. Willard appealed to the U.S. Supreme Court, which granted certiorari.

== Decision ==
=== Majority opinion ===
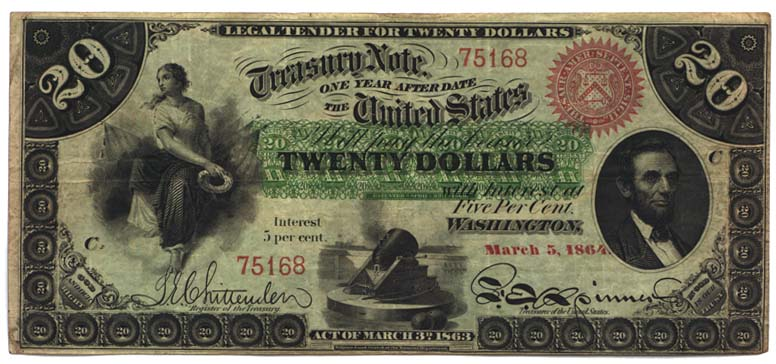
A $20 U.S. Bank Note from 1864.

Associate Justice Stephen Johnson Field delivered the unanimous opinion of the Court.

Justice Field concluded that contract law usually required courts to apply the terms of the contract as specified. But relief in cases of equity is a matter of discretion: "When a contract is of this character, it is the usual practice of courts of equity to enforce its specific execution upon the application of the party who has complied with its stipulations on his part or has seasonably and in good faith offered and continues ready to comply with them. But it is not the invariable practice. This form of relief is not a matter of absolute right to either party; it is a matter resting in the discretion of the court, to be exercised upon a consideration of all the circumstances of each particular case." That the initial contract was a fair one was not in dispute, Field noted: The sale price ($22,500) was much higher than the assessed value ($15,000), and no one could have foreseen that property values would more than double over the next 10 years.

The majority held that if "the contract [is] fair in its terms," discretion regarding relief may be exercised "if ... subsequent events, or even ... collateral circumstances... would work hardship or injustice to either of the parties." "[E]stablished doctrines and settled principles of equity" should be employed to determine the relief to be imposed, and the "specific relief will be granted when it is apparent from a view of all the circumstances of the particular case that it will subserve the ends of justice, and that it will be withheld when from a like view it appears that it will produce hardship or injustice to either of the parties."

Two issues now confronted the Court.

The first was the nature of the "cash" which the contract specified be used as the down payment in 1854. Justice Field concluded that "cash" meant gold coin, as no other form of legal tender existed in 1854. The creation of paper currency subsequent to the 1854 contract did not alleviate Willard of the requirement that the down payment be made in "cash" (e.g., gold coin), Field held. But the issue did not end there. Had Willard acted in good faith in offering the U.S. Notes? If not, then no relief was likely: The contract had expired, and Willard had not acted in a timely fashion to secure his rights under it by submitting a cash down-payment. But if he had acted in good faith, then Willard would be able to seek relief from courts of equity. The constitutionality of the National Banking Act was not at issue, the Court said, because the issue before the Court was not whether paper currency constituted "cash" but whether Willard acted in good faith (e.g., had assumed in good faith that U.S. Notes constitute cash, as Congress had said they did). Field laid out extensive reasons for why Willard had acted in good faith:

1. Congress had declared the Notes to be legal tender for all debts, and the National Banking Act made no distinction between debts contracted before or after this change.
2. Gold was no longer used for currency, and U.S. Notes constituted almost the entire currency.
3. Almost every state court had upheld the constitutionality of the National Banking Act.
4. Tayloe had left the city before the expiration of the contract, preventing Willard from discussing with him the nature of the "cash" to be used for the down payment.
5. Willard had petitioned the courts in a timely matter, expressing his desire to fulfill the contract in good faith.

Since Willard had acted in good faith, the Court concluded, the contract was still in force.

The second issue confronting the Court was the effect which inflation had on the sale price of the property. The Court flatly refused to overturn the contract on grounds of equity simply because the assessed value had exceeded the anticipated rate of inflation. The parties had considered the effect inflation might have, and had agreed on the terms. No objection had been raised at any time by either party prior to agreement, and the contract was (as Field previously noted) fair. But the Court also recognized that forcing Tayloe to accept paper currency valued at one-half that of coin would also be unjust.

The Court also dispensed with a third issue, which Tayloe had raised. Willard had transferred a half-interest in the deed to the property to his brother. Tayloe argued this rendered the contract void because he had not agreed to make the brother a party to the agreement. But the majority rejected this argument: "[T]hat is a matter with which the defendant has no concern."

The majority remanded the case back to the district court with the instruction that Willard make the down payment, subsequent purchase price payments, interest payments, and yearly rent to Tayloe in gold and silver coin. Upon satisfaction of the down payment, Tayloe must convey the deed to Willard. The price of the property, however, was not adjusted.

=== Concurrence ===
Chief Justice Salmon P. Chase and Associate Justice Samuel Nelson concurred in the decision regarding payment in gold and silver coin, but not the reasoning behind the holding.

== Impact of the case ==
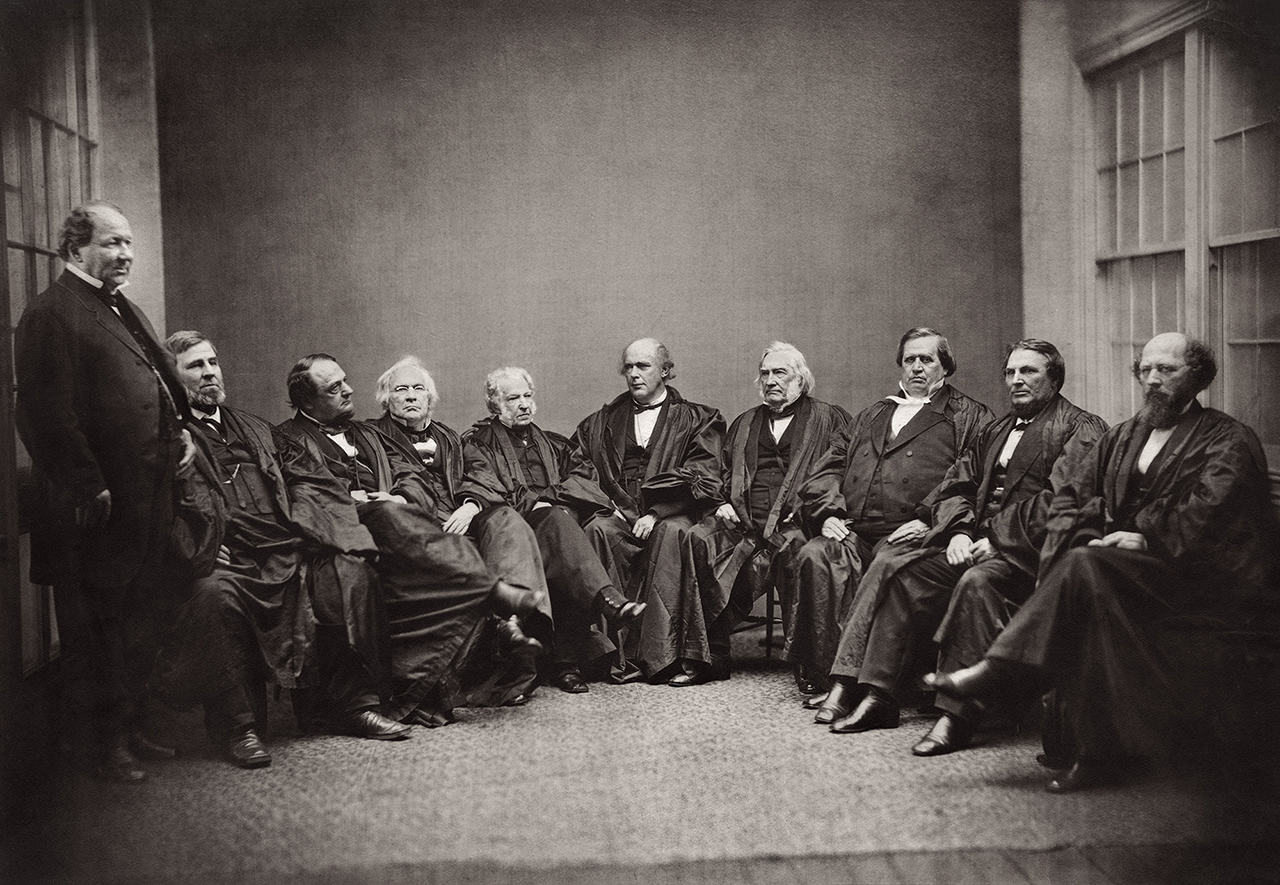
The members of the Chase Court.

Henry Willard successfully purchased the property from Benjamin Ogle Tayloe, and the Willard Hotel became one of Washington, D.C.'s, landmark hotels. It still exists, although the name has changed to the Willard InterContinental Hotel, and it is one of the city's best-known luxury hotels.

Willard v. Tayloe was an important decision of the Chase Court. The case went directly to the heart of Chase's core convictions regarding banking and monetary policy. While Chase favored a banking system that was national and centralized, he was initially opposed to the introduction of paper money and (contrary to President Abraham Lincoln's policy) believed U.S. Bank Notes should be convertible into gold. Willard v. Tayloe and the Legal Tender Cases were "the most significant set of cases decided by the Chase Court".

The Willard decision is a classic example of a "conditional order of specific performance." Courts of equity often use a monetary calculus to judge hardship. Frustration of purpose can occur when the terms of a contract are applied literally and automatically without taking into consideration radical changes in the economic or physical environment.

The Willard court was also wrestling with a 19th-century concept of money that was quickly becoming outmoded. This concept, known as "nominalism," assumed that money had an intrinsic value which did not change. The value of a gold coin of a certain size was always the value of such a gold coin, and inflation did not exist. Metallism (using coins of some valuable metal like gold or silver) is a nominalistic money system, one which the United States had moved away from with the National Banking Act of 1863. Nominalism was critical to the development of the law of contract and the modern industrial economy. Most nations adhered to it until the 20th century but abandoned it thereafter. This trend away from nominalism was under way at the time the Willard case came before the Supreme Court, and it represents the Court's attempt to reconcile this modern economics with contract law.

The Supreme Court's ruling in Willard also was certainly influenced by the forthcoming Legal Tender Cases. The Court was ready to take up Hepburn v. Griswold, a case it would decide in 1870 and which would hold that the issuance of U.S. Notes was unconstitutional. Within a year, however, the Supreme Court would overrule Hepburn v. Griswold, and in Knox v. Lee, 79 U.S. 457 (1871) and Parker v. Davis, 79 U.S. 457 (1871) uphold the constitutionality of the Legal Tender Act of 1862. It would more broadly do so again in Juilliard v. Greenman, 110 U.S. 421 (1884). The problem for the Willard court was how to craft a conditional order of specific performance, for any adjustment in the amount of paper currency tendered by Willard would have tacitly indicated that paper currency was valid (e.g., constitutionally issued).

The decision is also notable for being the only one of four major Supreme Court decisions on equity which invoked the English common law roots of American equity jurisprudence. Even so, Justice Field never addressed the main point of English common law equity, which was to protect public interests.

For many years, the Willard decision was the leading case in contract law regarding intent and enforcement. The case is still considered the leading decision on frustration of purpose regarding inflation in contracts. The Willard Court's conclusion that coin rather than paper currency be the form of payment (even though coin was no longer used) has drawn criticism from modern commentators, who found it inequitable. At least one modern commentator has characterized the decision "temporizing and cautious". Another has observed that the ruling never attempts to distinguish legitimate inflation from speculation or economic bubbles. The fact-specific nature of the Court-fashioned relief has also tended to limit the ruling's applicability. In part, this may be because modern contracts often require an independent re-appraisal of the land prior to sale.

A 1978 United States district court case, Iowa Elec. Light & Power Co. v. Atlas Corp., 467 F. Supp. 129 (N.D. Iowa), has called into question the Supreme Court's assertion of discretion in equity cases, arguing that courts only have the ability to alter the time, place, and manner of payment and not the actual price.

== See also ==
- List of United States Supreme Court cases, volume 75
- Knox v. Lee
- Legal Tender Cases

== Bibliography ==
- Blue, Frederick J. Salmon P. Chase: A Life in Politics. Kent, Ohio: Kent State University Press, 1987.
- Burlingame, Michael. With Lincoln in the White House: Letters, Memoranda, and Other Writings of John G. Nicolay, 1860-1865. Carbondale, Ill.: SIU Press, 2006.
- Corbin, Arthur L. Corbin on Contracts. St. Paul, Minn.: West Publishing Co., 1964.
- Dawson, John P. "Judicial Revision of Frustrated Contracts: The United States." Boston University Law Review. 64:1 (January 1984).
- Dawson, John P. and Cooper, Frank E. "The Effect of Inflation on Private Contracts: United States, 1862-79." Michigan Law Review. 33:6 (1935).
- Denby, Elaine. Grand Hotels: Reality & Illusion. London: Reaktion Books, 1998.
- "Events Subsequent to the Contract As a Defence to Specific Performance." Columbia Law Review. May 1916.
- Fleming, John G. "The Impact of Inflation on Tort Compensation." American Journal of Comparative Law. 26:51 (Winter 1978).
- Goode, James M. Capital Losses: A Cultural History of Washington's Destroyed Buildings. 2d ed. Washington, D.C.: Smithsonian Institution, 2003.
- Hardy, Stella Pickett. Colonial Families of the Southern States of America: A History and Genealogy of Colonial Families Who Settled in the Colonies Prior to the Revolution. New York: Wright, 1911.
- Harman, Steven G. "Note: Alleviating Hardship Arising From Inflation and Court Congestion: Toward the Use of the Conditional Specific Performance Decree." Southern California Law Review. 56:795 (March 1983).
- Hirschberg, Eliy Ahn. The Nominalistic Principle: A Legal Approach to Inflation, Deflation, Devaluation and Revaluation. Ramat-Gan, Israel: Bar-Ilan University, 1971.
- Hogarth, Paul. Walking Tours of Old Washington and Alexandria. McLean, Va.: EPM Publications, 1985.
- Johnson, Robert Underwood and Buel, Clarence Clough. Battles and Leaders of the Civil War. New York: Century Co., 1888.
- Kregel, Jan. (January 1990). "The Rise of the Greenback - US Dollar - The Fortunes of Money". UNESCO Courier. Archived from the original on January 21, 2005 – via FindArticles.
- Levy, Daniel W. "A Legal History of Irrational Exuberance." Case Western Reserve Law Review. 48:799 (Summer 1998).
- McPherson, James M. Battle Cry of Freedom: The Civil War Era. New York: Oxford University Press, 1988.
- Mitchell, Wesley C. A History of the Greenbacks, With Special Reference to the Economic Consequences of Their Issue: 1862-65. Chicago: University of Chicago Press, 1903.
- Moeller, Gerard Martin and Weeks, Christopher. AIA Guide to the Architecture of Washington, D.C. Baltimore, Md.: Johns Hopkins University Press, 2006.
- Niven, John. Salmon P. Chase: A Biography. New York: Oxford University Press, 1995.
- O'Leary, Paul M. "Repeal of the Greenback Conversion Clause." The American Journal of Economics and Sociology. 22:4 (October 1963).
- Renner, Shirley. Inflation and the Enforcement of Contracts. Cheltenham, England: Elgar, 1999.
- Resnik, Judith. "Constricting Remedies: The Rehnquist Judiciary, Congress, and Federal Power." Indiana Law Journal. 78:223 (Winter/Spring 2003).
- Tindall, William. Standard History of the City of Washington From a Study of the Original Sources. Knoxville, Tenn.: H.W. Crew & Co., 1914.
- Watson, Winslow Marston. In Memoriam: Benjamin Ogle Tayloe. Philadelphia: Sherman & Co., 1872.
- White, G. Edward. "Reconstructing the Constitutional Jurisprudence of Salmon P. Chase." Northern Kentucky Law Review. 21:41 (Fall 1993).
- Willard, Henry Kellogg. "Henry Augustus Willard: His Life and Times." Records of the Columbia Historical Society. 1917.
- Wilson, Mark R. The Business of Civil War: Military Mobilization and the State, 1861-1865. Baltimore, Md.: Johns Hopkins University Press, 2006.
