= Horace Gray =

US Supreme Court justice from 1882 to 1902

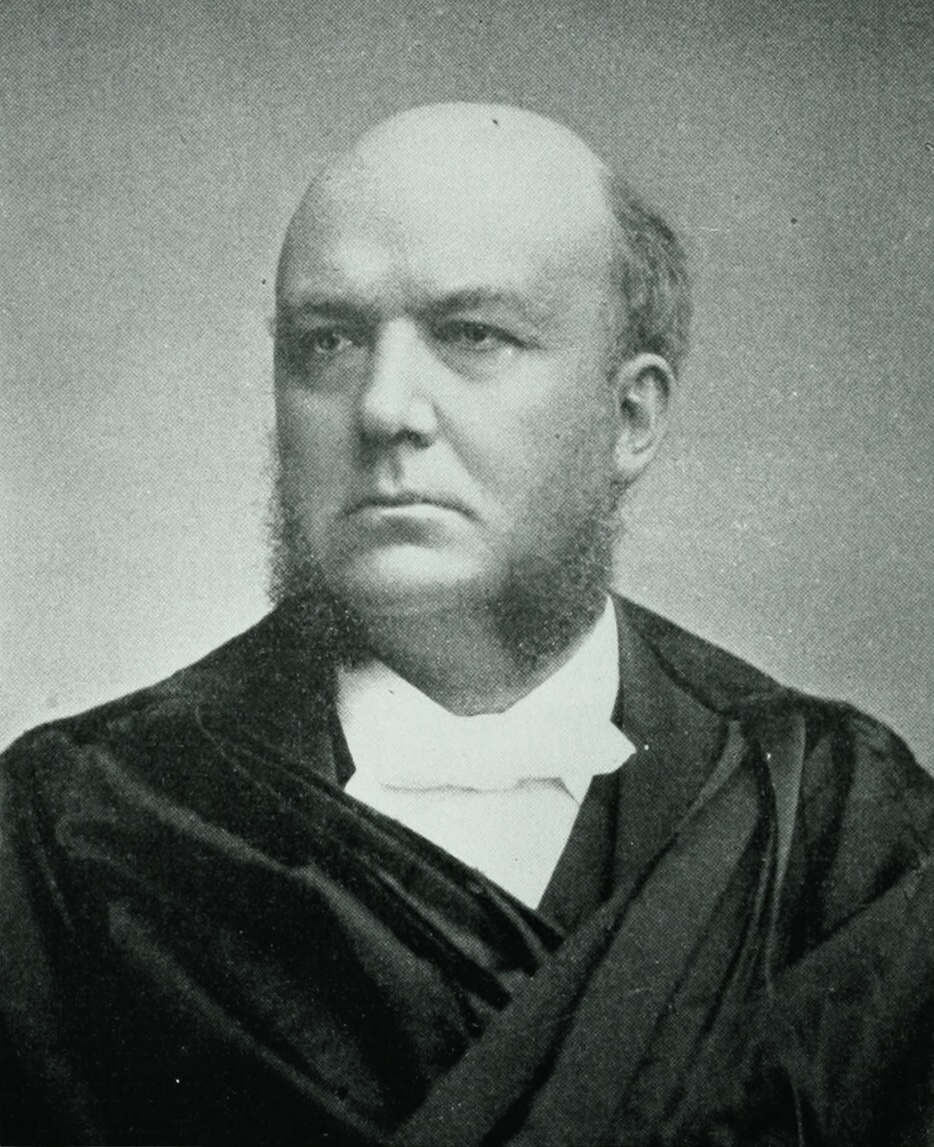
- Justice Gray, c. 1899

Associate Justice of the Supreme Court of the United States
- In office January 9, 1882 – September 15, 1902
- Nominated by: Chester Arthur
- Preceded by: Nathan Clifford
- Succeeded by: Oliver Wendell Holmes Jr.

Chief Justice of the Massachusetts Supreme Judicial Court
- In office September 5, 1873 – January 9, 1882
- Nominated by: William Washburn
- Preceded by: Reuben Chapman
- Succeeded by: Marcus Morton

Associate Justice of the Massachusetts Supreme Judicial Court
- In office August 23, 1864 – September 5, 1873
- Nominated by: John Andrew
- Preceded by: Pliny Merrick
- Succeeded by: Charles Devens

Personal details
- Born: March 24, 1828 Boston, Massachusetts, U.S.
- Died: September 15, 1902 (aged 74) Nahant, Massachusetts, U.S.
- Party: Republican
- Spouse: Jane Matthews (m. 1889)
- Education: Harvard University (AB, LLB)

Horace Gray (March 24, 1828 – September 15, 1902) was an American jurist who served on the Massachusetts Supreme Judicial Court, and then on the United States Supreme Court, where he frequently interpreted the Constitution in ways that increased the powers of Congress. He was a staunch supporter of the authority of precedent throughout his career, and would write landmark opinions in cases such as Elk v. Wilkins and United States v. Wong Kim Ark.

== Early life ==
Gray was born in Boston, Massachusetts, the son of Horace and Harriet (née Upham) Gray, and grandson of merchant and politician William Gray. He enrolled at Harvard College at the age of 13, and graduated four years later. After traveling in Europe for a time, Gray entered Harvard Law School, from which he graduated with an LL.B. in 1849. Gray was admitted to the bar in 1851, and practiced law in Boston for 13 years.

== Judicial career ==
=== Massachusetts state courts ===
In 1854, he was named Reporter of Decisions for the Massachusetts Supreme Judicial Court. While serving in this capacity, Gray edited sixteen volumes of court records, and also served as a counselor to the governor of Massachusetts on legal and constitutional questions. The quality of Gray's work earned him a reputation for historical scholarship and legal research.

Gray was appointed to the Massachusetts Supreme Judicial Court as an associate justice in 1864. At age 36, he was the youngest appointee in the Court's history. Nine years later he was elevated to chief justice. While serving as chief justice, Gray hired Louis D. Brandeis as a clerk, becoming the first justice of that court to hire a law clerk.

=== United States Supreme Court ===
In December 1881, President Chester A. Arthur nominated Gray to fill the vacancy on the U.S. Supreme Court created by the death of Nathan Clifford. The United States Senate quickly confirmed his appointment, and on January 9, 1882, he officially joined the Court.

As he had been in Massachusetts, Gray was also the first U.S. Supreme Court justice to hire a law clerk. He used his own funds to pay the clerk's salary, as no government money was appropriated for this purpose at the time. Additionally, he was one of the few Supreme Court appointees in the latter half of the 19th century who had not previously been a politician, and he maintained the opinion that law and politics were entirely separate fields.

Two years after joining the Court, he wrote the majority opinion in Juilliard v. Greenman (1884), the last of the post–Civil War Legal Tender Cases, which reaffirmed that Congress did have the power to issue paper money as legal tender. The 8–1 decision rested largely on prior court cases as well as an assessment of what the Framers of the Constitution intended to achieve (i.e. their original intent) through their grant of certain "Enumerated powers" to Congress in Article I, Section 8.

The most enduring of his written opinions is the one he authored in Mutual Life Insurance Co. of New York v. Hillmon (1892), which held that a declarant's out-of-court statement of his intention to do something or go somewhere in the future is admissible under the "state-of-mind" hearsay exception. "The letters in question were competent, not as narratives of facts communicated to [Walters] by others, nor yet as proof that he actually went away from Wichita, but as evidence that, shortly before the time when other evidence tended to show that he went away, he had the intention of going, and of going with Hillmon, which made it more probable both that he did go and that he went with Hillmon, than if there had been no proof of such intention." This holding was subsequently codified in Rule 803(3) of the Federal Rules of Evidence, as well as the evidence laws in most states.

Gray was also the author of the 1898 case United States v. Wong Kim Ark, ruling that "a child born in the United States, of parents of Chinese descent, who, at the time of his birth, are subjects of the Emperor of China, but have a permanent domicil and residence in the United States, and are there carrying on business, and are not employed in any diplomatic or official capacity under the Emperor of China, becomes at the time of his birth a citizen of the United States.".

He joined the majority in Pollock v. Farmers' Loan & Trust Co. (1895), a 5–4 ruling that the unapportioned income taxes on interest, dividends and rents imposed by the Income Tax Act of 1894 were unconstitutional. This case was heard twice, though only the second hearing resulted in a decision; the justices, feeling that the opinions written had not adequately explained their view of the situation, wished to rehear the case. After the first hearing, Gray wrote that he sided with the defendant (Farmer's Loan & Trust), arguing that the tax was indeed constitutional. He was in the minority, however. After the second hearing, Gray changed his stance, joining with the majority in favor of the plaintiff. He also sided with the majority in Plessy v. Ferguson (1896), a 7–1 ruling that upheld the constitutionality of racial segregation laws for public facilities as long as the segregated facilities were equal in quality.

Gray served on the US Supreme Court for over 20 years, until his death on September 15, 1902. He was succeeded by a fellow Massachusetts native, Oliver Wendell Holmes Jr., who, like Gray, previously served on the Massachusetts Supreme Judicial Court.

== Personal life ==
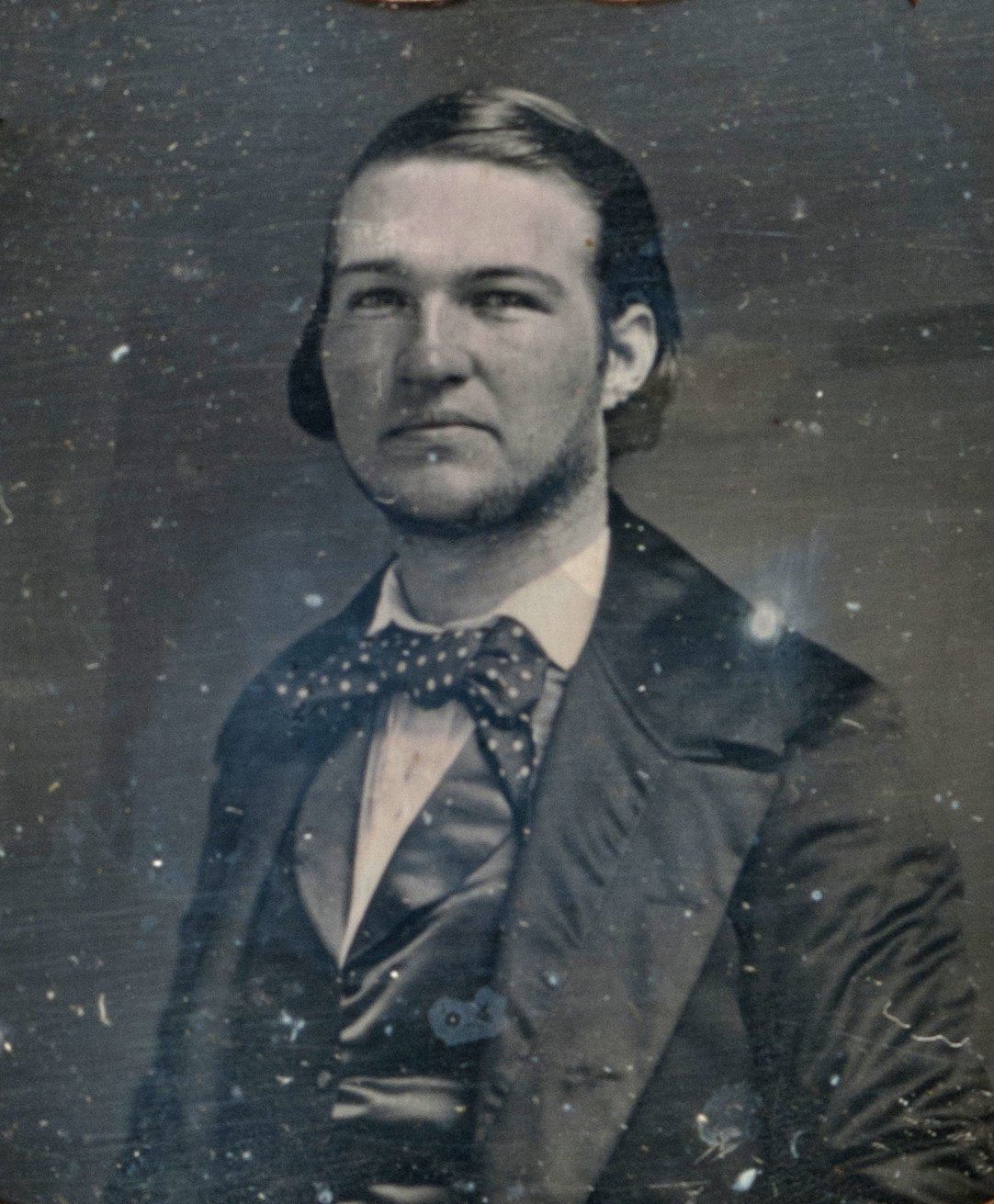
Horace Gray circa 1850

He was elected a member of the American Antiquarian Society in 1860, and in 1866, was elected a Fellow of the American Academy of Arts and Sciences. In 1889, Gray married Jane Matthews (1860–1949), daughter of fellow associate justice Stanley Matthews.

Gray's half-brother, John Chipman Gray, was long-time professor at Harvard Law School, and is noted for his formative text on the rule against perpetuities.

Horace Gray is buried in Mount Auburn Cemetery in Middlesex County, Massachusetts. His home in Washington, D.C. later became the site of the Third Church of Christ, Scientist, which was demolished in 2014.

== Legacy ==
The World War II Liberty Ship SS Horace Gray was named in his honor.

== See also ==
- List of justices of the Supreme Court of the United States

Legal offices
Preceded by Pliny Merrick	Associate Justice of the Massachusetts Supreme Judicial Court; 1864–1873	Succeeded by Charles Devens
Preceded by Reuben Chapman	Chief Justice of the Massachusetts Supreme Judicial Court; 1873–1882	Succeeded by Marcus Morton
Preceded by Nathan Clifford	Associate Justice of the Supreme Court of the United States; 1881–1902	Succeeded by Oliver Holmes
