= United States Note =

Type of paper money that was issued from 1862 to 1971 in the United States

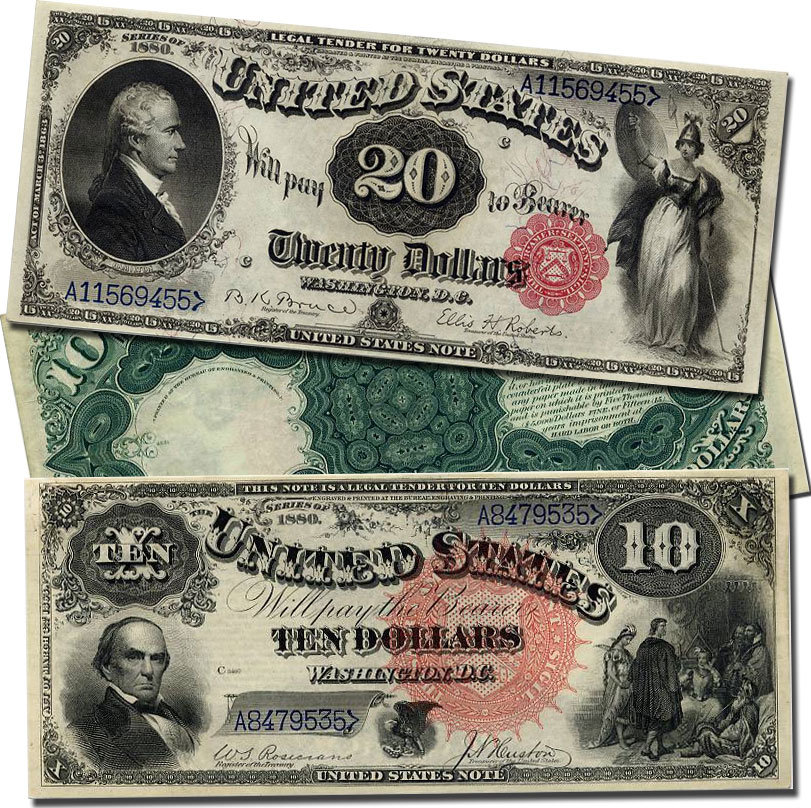
Large-sized Series of 1880 United States Notes; the $20 note displays Alexander Hamilton and a red scalloped Treasury seal, and the $10 note displays Daniel Webster and a large red spiked Treasury seal

A United States Note, also known as a Legal Tender Note, is a type of paper money that was issued from 1862 to 1971 in the United States. Having been current for 109 years, they were issued for longer than any other form of U.S. paper money other than the currently issued Federal Reserve Note. They were known popularly as "greenbacks", a name inherited from the earlier greenbacks, the Demand Notes, that they replaced in 1862. Often termed Legal Tender Notes, they were named United States Notes by the First Legal Tender Act, which authorized them as a form of fiat currency. During the early 1860s the so-called second obligation on the reverse of the notes stated:

This Note is a Legal Tender for all debts public and private except Duties on Imports and Interest on the Public Debt; and is receivable in payment of all loans made to the United States.

By the 1930s, this obligation would eventually be shortened to:

This note is a legal tender at its face value for all debts public and private

They were originally issued directly into circulation by the U.S. Treasury to pay expenses incurred by the Union during the American Civil War. During the next century, the legislation governing these notes was modified many times and numerous versions were issued by the Treasury.

United States Notes that were issued in the large-size format, before 1929, differ dramatically in appearance when compared to modern American currency, but those issued in the small-size format, starting 1929, are very similar to contemporary Federal Reserve Notes of the same denominations with the distinction of having red U.S. Treasury Seals and serial numbers in place of green ones. Also, while a variety of denominations were issued as United States Notes during the large-size era, only the $1, $2, $5, and $100 denominations were ever issued as small-size notes.

Existing United States Notes are still fully usable and are still legal tender. However, as no United States Notes have been issued since January 1971, all issues have all but disappeared from circulation, and command higher prices than face value as items of numismatic interest.

== History ==
=== Demand Notes ===
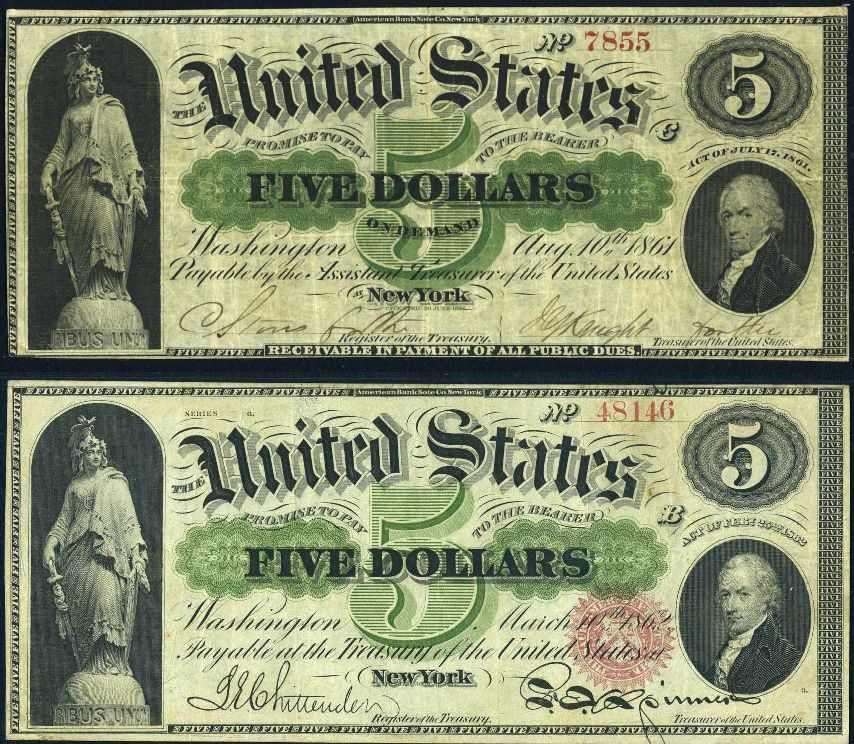
Comparison of a $5 Demand Note (upper image) and an 1862 issue $5 United States Note (lower image) in which the words "On Demand" and the phrase "Receivable in Payment of All Public Dues" are removed and the Treasury Seal is added

During 1861, the first year of the American Civil War, the expenses incurred by the Union Government much exceeded its limited revenues from taxation, and borrowing was the main vehicle for financing the war. The Act of July 17, 1861 authorized United States Secretary of the Treasury Salmon P. Chase to raise money via the issuance of $50,000,000 in Treasury Notes payable on demand. These Demand Notes were paid to creditors directly and used to meet the payroll of soldiers in the field. While issued within the legal framework of Treasury Note Debt, the Demand Notes were intended to circulate as currency and were of the same size as banknotes and closely resembled them in appearance. During December 1861, economic conditions deteriorated and with the suspension of specie payment the government broke the promise to redeeming the Demand Notes on demand. It did however continue to accept them as payment for import duties and almost all Demand Notes were eventually redeemed.

=== The Legal Tender Acts ===
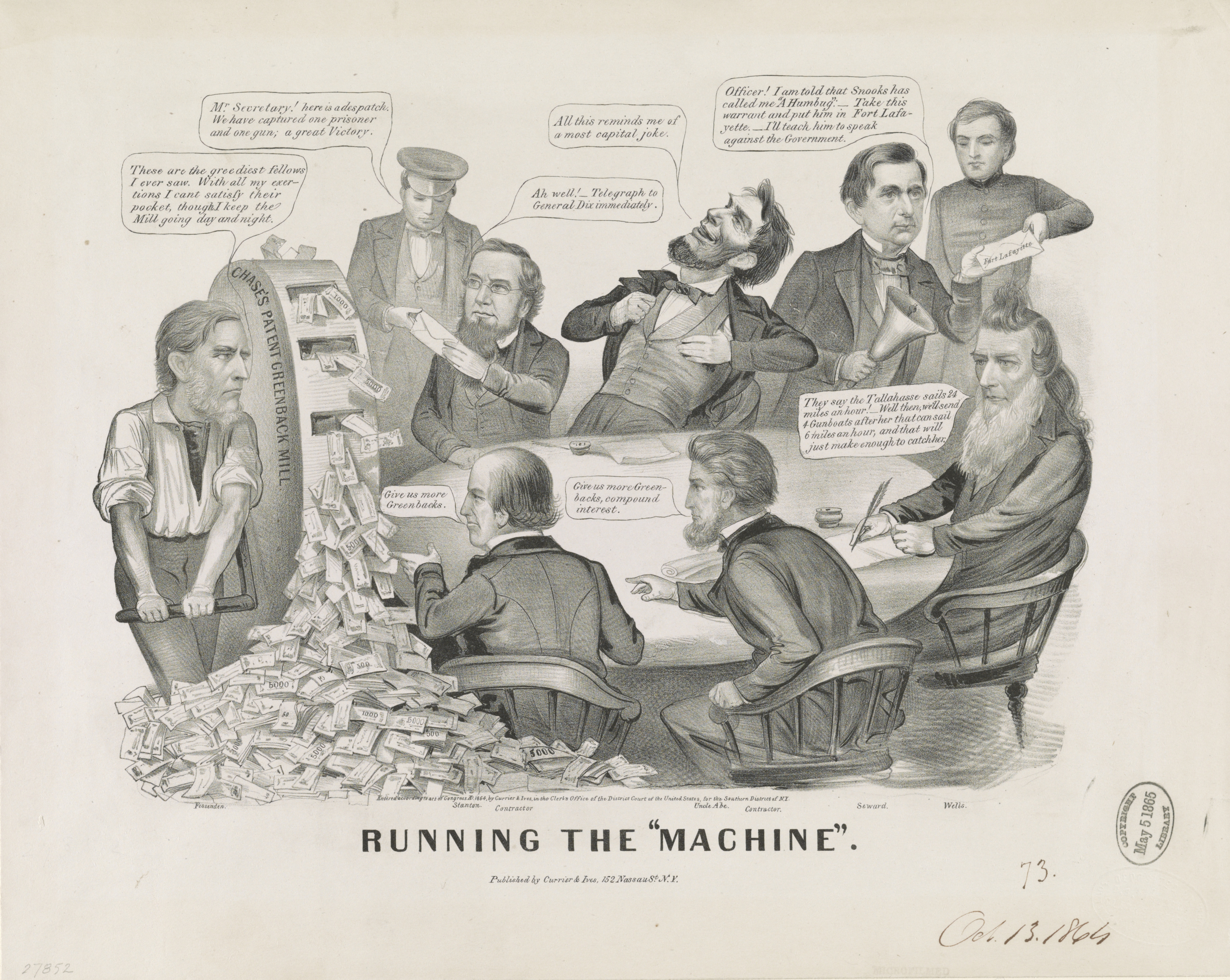
A political cartoon from the 1864 U.S. presidential election depicting Secretary Fessenden of the Lincoln administration operating "Chase's Mill" at left to flood the country with Greenbacks.

The beginning of 1862 found the Union's expenses increasing, and the government was having trouble funding the escalating war. U.S. Demand Notes—which were used, among other things, to pay Union soldiers—were unredeemable, and the value of the notes began to deteriorate. Congressman and Buffalo banker Elbridge G. Spaulding prepared a bill, based on the Free Banking Law of New York, that eventually became the National Banking Act of 1863.

Recognizing, however, that his proposal would take many months to pass Congress, during early February Spaulding introduced another bill to permit the U.S. Treasury to issue $150 million in notes as legal tender. This caused tremendous controversy in Congress, as hitherto the Constitution had been interpreted as not granting the government the power to issue a paper currency. "The bill before us is a war measure, a measure of necessity, and not of choice," Spaulding argued before the House, adding, "These are extraordinary times, and extraordinary measures must be resorted to in order to save our Government, and preserve our nationality." Spaulding justified the action as a "necessary means of carrying into execution the powers granted in the Constitution 'to raise and support armies', and 'to provide and maintain a navy'". Despite strong opposition, President Abraham Lincoln signed the First Legal Tender Act, enacted February 25, 1862, into law, authorizing the issuance of United States Notes as a legal tender—the paper currency soon to be known as "greenbacks".

Initially, the emission was limited to $150,000,000 total face value between the new Legal Tender Notes and the existing Demand Notes. The Act also intended for the new notes to be used to replace the Demand Notes as soon as practical. The Demand Notes had been issued in denominations of $5, $10, and $20, and these were replaced by United States Notes nearly identical in appearance on the obverse. In addition, notes of entirely new design were introduced in denominations of $50, $100, $500 and $1,000. The Demand Notes' printed promise of payment "On Demand" was removed and the statement "This Note is a Legal Tender" was added.

Legal tender status guaranteed that creditors would have to accept the notes despite the fact that they were not backed by gold, bank deposits, or government reserves, and had no interest. However, the First Legal Tender Act did not make the notes an unlimited legal tender as they could not be used by merchants to pay customs duties on imports and could not be used by the government to pay interest on its bonds. The Act did provide that the notes be receivable by the government for short term deposits at 5% interest, and for the purchase of 6% interest 20-year bonds at par. The rationale for these terms was that the Union government would preserve its credit-worthiness by supporting the value of its bonds by paying their interest in gold. Early in the war, customs duties were a large part of government tax revenue and by making these payable in gold, the government would generate the coin necessary to make the interest payments on the bonds. Lastly, by making the bonds available for purchase at par in United States Notes, the value of the latter would be confirmed as well. The limitations of the legal tender status were quite controversial. Thaddeus Stevens, the Chairman of the House of Representatives Committee of Ways and Means, which had authored an earlier version of the Legal Tender Act that would have made United States Notes a legal tender for all debts, denounced the exceptions, calling the new bill "mischievous" because it made United States Notes an intentionally depreciated currency for the masses, while the banks who loaned to the government got "sound money" in gold. This controversy would continue until the removal of the exceptions during 1933.

By the First Legal Tender Act, Congress limited the Treasury's emission of United States Notes to $150,000,000; however, by 1863, the Second Legal Tender Act, enacted July 11, 1862, a Joint Resolution of Congress, and the Third Legal Tender Act, enacted March 3, 1863, had expanded the limit to $450,000,000, the option to exchange the notes for United States bonds at par had been revoked, and notes of $1 and $2 denominations had been introduced as the appearance of pure 'fiat currency' had per Gresham's law driven even silver coinage out of circulation. The greenback began to trade at a substantial discount from gold, which prompted Congress to pass the short-lived Anti-Gold Futures Act of 1864, which was soon repealed after it seemed to accelerate the decrease of greenback value.

The largest amount of greenbacks outstanding at any one time was calculated as $447,300,203.10. The Union's reliance on expanding the circulation of greenbacks eventually ended with the emission of Interest Bearing and Compound Interest Treasury Notes, and the passage of the National Banking Act. However, the end of the war found the greenbacks trading for only about half of their nominal value in gold. The Secret Service was founded on July 5, 1865, to minimize counterfeiting, which accounted for up to half of the currency.

=== Post Civil War ===
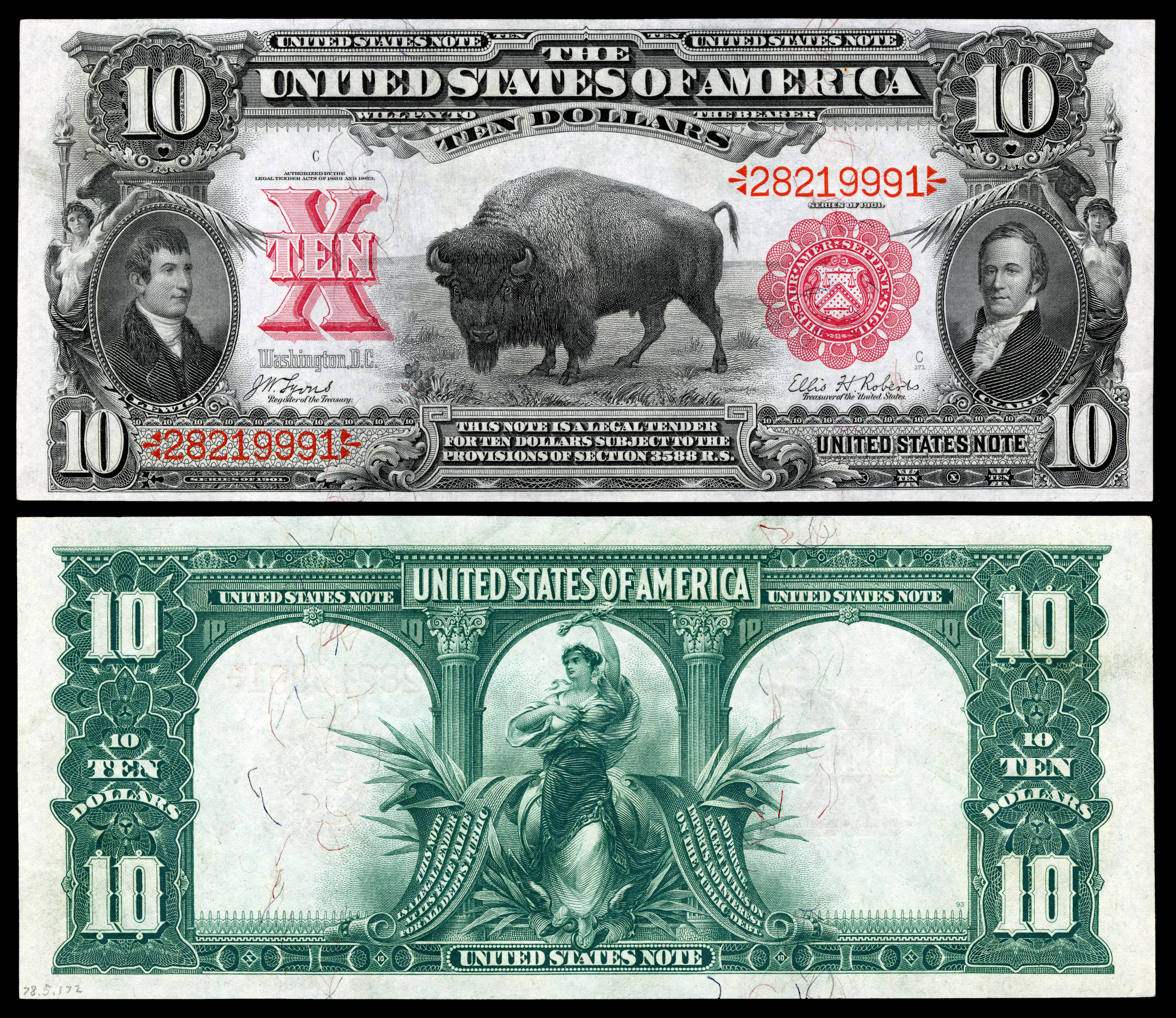
Series of 1901 $10 Legal Tender depicting military explorers Meriwether Lewis, William Clark, and an American bison

At the end of the American Civil War, some economists, such as Henry Charles Carey, argued for building on the precedent of non-interest-based fiat money and making the greenback system permanent. However, Secretary of the Treasury McCulloch argued that the Legal Tender Acts had been war measures, and that the United States should soon reverse them and return to the gold standard. The House of Representatives voted overwhelmingly to endorse the Secretary's argument. With an eventual return to gold convertibility in mind, the Funding Act of April 12, 1866 was passed, authorizing McCulloch to retire $10 million of the Greenbacks within six months and up to $4 million per month thereafter. This he proceeded to do until only $356,000,000 were outstanding during February 1868. By this time, the wartime economic prosperity was ended, the crop harvest was poor, and a financial panic in Great Britain caused a recession and a sharp decrease of prices in the United States. The contraction of the money supply was blamed for the deflationary effects, and caused debtors to agitate successfully for a halt to the notes' retirement.

During the early 1870s, Treasury Secretaries George S. Boutwell and William Adams Richardson maintained that, though Congress had mandated $356,000,000 as the minimum Greenback circulation, the old Civil War statutes still authorized a maximum of $400,000,000 (Note: While the three Legal Tender Acts had authorized $450,000,000 of notes, the Second Legal Tender Act, in taking the total from $150,000,000 to $300,000,000 had reserved $50,000,000 of the increase for the purpose of redeeming balances in a temporary deposit program. The Act of June 30, 1864, reiterated this limitation, and as the temporary loan program had ceased to exist, only $400,000,000 of the $450,000,000 ceiling were available.)—and thus they had at their discretion a "reserve" of $44,000,000. While the Senate Finance Committee under John Sherman disagreed, being of the opinion that the $356,000,000 was a maximum as well as a minimum, no legislation was passed to assert the committee's opinion. Starting in 1872, Boutwell and Richardson used the "reserve" to counteract seasonal demands for currency, and eventually expanded the circulation of the Greenbacks to $382,000,000 in response to the Panic of 1873.

In June 1874, Congress established a maximum for Greenback circulation of $382,000,000, and in January 1875, approved the Specie Payment Resumption Act, which authorized a reduction of the circulation of Greenbacks towards a revised limit of $300,000,000, and required the government to redeem them for gold, on demand, after January 1, 1879. As a result, the currency strengthened and by April 1876, the notes were on par with silver coins which then began to re-emerge into circulation. On May 31, 1878, the contraction in the circulation was halted at $346,681,016—a level which would be maintained for almost 100 years afterwards. While $346,681,016 was a significant figure at the time, it is now a very small fraction of the total currency in circulation in the United States. The year 1879 found Sherman, now Secretary of the Treasury, in possession of sufficient specie to redeem notes as requested, but as this brought the value of the greenbacks into parity with gold for the first time since the Specie Suspension of December 1861, the public voluntarily accepted the greenbacks as part of the circulating medium.

While the United States Notes had been used as a form of debt issuance during the Civil War, afterwards they were used as a way of moderately influencing the money supply by the federal government—such as through the actions of Boutwell and Richardson. During the Panic of 1907, President Theodore Roosevelt attempted to increase liquidity in the markets by authorizing the Treasury to issue more Greenbacks, but the Aldrich–Vreeland Act provided for the needed flexibility by the National Bank Note supply instead. Eventually, the perceived need for an elastic currency was addressed with the Federal Reserve Notes authorized by the Federal Reserve Act of 1913, and attempts to alter the circulating quantity of United States Notes ended.

=== End of the United States Note ===
Soon after private ownership of gold was banned in 1933 (a ban that would be lifted in 1974), all of the remaining types of circulating currency, National Bank Notes, silver certificates, Federal Reserve Notes, and United States Notes, were redeemable by individuals only for silver. Eventually, even silver redemption stopped in June 1968, during a time in which all U.S. currency (both coins and paper currency) was changed to 'fiat currency'. For the general public, there was then little to distinguish United States Notes from Federal Reserve Notes. As a result, the public circulation of United States Notes, in the form of $2 and $5 bills was discontinued in August 1966, and replaced with $5 Federal Reserve Notes and, eventually, $2 Federal Reserve Notes as well. United States Notes became rare in hand-to-hand commerce and also beginning in 1966, the Treasury converted the outstanding balance into new $100 United States Notes, the majority of which sat unissued in bank vaults. Series 1966 and Series 1966A $100 United States Notes were printed from 1966 to 1969, with distribution into public circulation officially ending January 21, 1971.

In September 1994, the Riegle Improvement Act released the Treasury from its long-standing obligation to keep United States Notes in circulation. Just prior to the Riegle act, the Treasury considered releasing its large remaining stockpile of unissued $100 United States Notes into general circulation, but with the recently redesigned series 1996 $100 Federal Reserve Note, it was decided confusion would likely arise with the sudden appearance of two very different $100 notes in circulation. The Treasury announced in 1996 that the remaining stock of $100 United States Notes had been destroyed.

== Comparison to Federal Reserve Notes ==
Both United States Notes and Federal Reserve Notes have been legal tender since the gold recall of 1933. Both have been used in circulation as money in the same way. However, the issuing authority for them came from different statutes. United States Notes are, depending on their issue, redeemable directly for precious metal – as after the specie resumption of 1879 which authorized federal officials to do so if requested. The difference between a United States Note and a Federal Reserve Note is that a United States Note represented a "bill of credit" and, since it was issued by the government itself and does not involve either lending or borrowing, was inserted by the Treasury directly into circulation free of interest. The twelve Federal Reserve Banks issue them into circulation pursuant to the Federal Reserve Act of 1913. A commercial bank belonging to the Federal Reserve System can obtain Federal Reserve Notes from the Federal Reserve Bank in its district whenever it wishes. It must pay for them in full, dollar for dollar, by drawing down its account with its district Federal Reserve Bank.

== Characteristics ==
The size of the United States Note changed from large (gray) to small (green) with plate position letters and the slightly smaller modern Federal Reserve Note (blue) super-imposed on bottom left 1928-size note

Like all U.S. currency, United States Notes were produced in a large sized format until 1929, at which time the notes' sizes were reduced to the small-size format of the present day. (Note: Large size notes represent the earlier types or series of U.S. banknotes. Their average dimension is 7.375 in × 3.125 in (187 mm × 79 mm). Small size notes (described as such due to their size relative to the earlier large size notes) are an average 6.125 in × 2.625 in (156 mm × 67 mm), the size of modern U.S. currency. Each measurement is ±0.08 in (2 mm) to account for margins and cutting.) Per the Treasury Department Appropriation Bill of 1929, notes issued before October 1928 were 7 7/16 × 3 9/64 inches and later issues were to be 6 5/16 × 2 11/16 inches, which allowed the Treasury Department to produce 12 notes per 16 1/4 × 13 1/4 inch sheet of paper that previously would yield 8 notes at the old size.

The original large-sized Civil War issues were dated 1862 and 1863, and issued in denominations of $1, $2, $5, $10, $20, $50, $100, $500 and $1,000. The United States Notes were dramatically redesigned for the Series of 1869, the so-called Rainbow Notes. The notes were again redesigned for the Series of 1874, 1875 and 1878. The Series of 1878 included, for the first and last time, notes of $5,000 and $10,000 denominations. The final across-the-board redesign of the large-sized notes was the Series of 1880. Individual denominations were redesigned in 1901, 1907, 1917 and 1923.

On small-sized United States Notes, the U.S. Treasury Seal and the serial numbers are printed in red (contrasting with Federal Reserve Notes, where they appear in green). By the time the treasury adopted the small-size format in 1928, the Federal Reserve System had existed for fifteen years and there had been a decline in the need for United States Notes; the notes were mainly issued in $2 and $5 denominations in the Series years of 1928, 1953, and 1963. There was a limited issue of $1 notes in the Series of 1928, most of which were released in 1948 in Puerto Rico, and an issue of $100 notes in the Series year of 1966, mainly to satisfy the legacy legal requirement of maintaining the mandated quantity in circulation after the $2 and $5 denominations had been discontinued in August 1966. The Bureau of Engraving and Printing also printed but did not issue $10 notes in the 1928 Series. An example was displayed at the 1933 Worlds Fair in Chicago.

Section 5119(b)(2) of Title 31, United States Code, was amended by the Riegle Community Development and Regulatory Improvement Act of 1994 (Public Law 103–325) to read as follows: "The Secretary shall not be required to reissue United States currency notes upon redemption." This does not change the legal tender status of United States Notes nor does it require a recall of those notes already in circulation. This provision means that United States Notes are to be canceled and destroyed but not reissued. This will eventually result in a decrease in the amount of these notes outstanding.

=== Large-size United States Notes (1862–1923) ===
Complete type set of United States Notes (aka Legal Tender)
Value	Year	Fr. #	Image	Portrait (Note: Names in parentheses are either the engravers or artists responsible for the concept and/or initial design.)
$1	1862–63	Fr.16c		Salmon P. Chase (Joseph P. Ourdan)
$1	1869	Fr.18		George Washington
$1	1878	Fr.27		George Washington
$1	1880	Fr.29		George Washington
$1	1923	Fr.40	1923 $1 United States Note (Fr. 40).	George Washington
$2	1862–63	Fr.41		Alexander Hamilton
$2	1869	Fr.42		Thomas Jefferson
$2	1874	Fr.43	1874 $2 United States Note (Fr. 43).	Thomas Jefferson
$2	1875	Fr.47		Thomas Jefferson
$2	1880	Fr.52		Thomas Jefferson
$2	1917	Fr.60	1917 $2 United States Note (Fr. 60).	Thomas Jefferson
$5	1862–63	Fr.61a		Freedom (Owen G. Hanks, eng; Thomas Crawford, art); Alexander Hamilton
$5	1869	Fr.64		Andrew Jackson
$5	1875	Fr.68		Andrew Jackson
$5	1880	Fr.72		Andrew Jackson
$10	1862–63	Fr.95b		Abraham Lincoln (Frederick Girsch); Eagle; Art
$10	1869	Fr.96		Daniel Webster
$10	1875	Fr.98		Daniel Webster
$10	1880	Fr.102		Daniel Webster
$10	1901	Fr.114		Lewis & Clark
$10	1923	Fr.123		Andrew Jackson
$20	1862–63	Fr.126b		Liberty
$20	1869	Fr.127		Alexander Hamilton
$20	1875	Fr.128		Alexander Hamilton
$20	1880	Fr.145		Alexander Hamilton
$50	1862–63	Fr.148a		Alexander Hamilton (Joseph P. Ourdan)
$50	1869	Fr.151		Henry Clay
$50	1874	Fr.152		Benjamin Franklin
$50	1880	Fr.164		Benjamin Franklin
$100	1862–63	Fr.167		Vignette spread eagle (Joseph P. Ourdan)
$100	1869	Fr.168		Abraham Lincoln
$100	1878	Fr.171		Abraham Lincoln
$100	1880	Fr.181		Abraham Lincoln
$500	1862–63	Fr.183c		Albert Gallatin
$500	1869	Fr.184		John Quincy Adams (Charles Burt)
$500	1875	Fr.185b		Joseph K. Mansfield
$500	1880	Fr.185l		Joseph K. Mansfield
$1,000	1862–63	Fr.186e		Robert Morris (Charles Schlecht)
$1,000	1869	Fr.186f		DeWitt Clinton
$1,000	1878	Fr.187a		DeWitt Clinton
$1,000	1880	Fr.187k		DeWitt Clinton
$5,000	1878	Fr.188		James Madison
$10,000	1878	Fr.189		Andrew Jackson

=== Series 1928 United States Notes ===
United States Notes – First small-size issue, Series 1928 (Smithsonian Institution)
Image	Value	Dimensions	Main Color		
Obverse/Reverse	Value	Dimensions	Main Color	Obverse	Reverse
	$1 United States Note	6.140 in × 2.610 in (155.956 mm × 66.294 mm)	Green; Black	George Washington	Stylized "One Dollar"
	$2 United States Note	6.140 in × 2.610 in (155.956 mm × 66.294 mm)	Green; Black	Thomas Jefferson	Monticello
	$5 United States Note	6.140 in × 2.610 in (155.956 mm × 66.294 mm)	Green; Black	Abraham Lincoln	Lincoln Memorial

=== Series 1953 United States Notes ===
United States Notes – Small-size issue, Series 1953
Image	Value	Dimensions	Main Color		
Obverse/Reverse	Value	Dimensions	Main Color	Obverse	Reverse
	$2 United States Note	6.140 in × 2.610 in (155.956 mm × 66.294 mm)	Green; Black	Thomas Jefferson	Monticello
	$5 United States Note	6.140 in × 2.610 in (155.956 mm × 66.294 mm)	Green; Black	Abraham Lincoln	Lincoln Memorial

=== Series 1963 United States Notes ===
United States Notes – Small-size issue, Series 1963
Image	Value	Dimensions	Main Color		
Obverse/Reverse	Value	Dimensions	Main Color	Obverse	Reverse
	$2 United States Note	6.140 in × 2.610 in (155.956 mm × 66.294 mm)	Green; Black	Thomas Jefferson	Monticello
	$5 United States Note	6.140 in × 2.610 in (155.956 mm × 66.294 mm)	Green; Black	Abraham Lincoln	Lincoln Memorial

=== Series 1966 United States Notes ===
United States Notes – Small-size issue, Series 1966
Image	Value	Dimensions	Main Color		
Obverse/Reverse	Value	Dimensions	Main Color	Obverse	Reverse
	$100 United States Note	6.140 in × 2.610 in (155.956 mm × 66.294 mm)	Green; Black	Benjamin Franklin	Independence Hall

== Public debt of the United States ==
As of December 2012, the U.S. Treasury calculates that $239 million in United States Notes are in circulation and, in accordance with debt ceiling legislation, excludes this amount from the statutory debt limit of the United States. The $239 million excludes $25 million in United States Notes issued prior to July 1, 1929, determined pursuant to Act of June 30, 1961, 31 U.S.C. 5119, to have been destroyed or irretrievably lost.

== Politics and controversy ==
The United States Notes were introduced as fiat money rather than the precious metal medium of exchange that the United States had traditionally used. Their introduction was thus contentious.

The United States Congress had enacted the Legal Tender Acts during the American Civil War when southern Democrats were absent from the Congress, and thus their Jacksonian hard money views were underrepresented. After the war, the Supreme Court ruled on the Legal Tender Cases to determine the constitutionality of the use of greenbacks. The 1870 case Hepburn v. Griswold found unconstitutional the use of greenbacks when applied to debts established prior to the First Legal Tender Act as the five Democrats on the Court, Nelson, Grier, Clifford, Field, and Chase, ruled against the Civil War legislation in a 5–3 decision. Secretary Chase had become Chief Justice of the United States and a Democrat, and spearheaded the decision invalidating his own actions during the war. However, Grier retired from the Court, and President Grant appointed two new Republicans, Strong and Bradley, who joined the three sitting Republicans, Swayne, Miller, and Davis, to reverse Hepburn, 5–4, in the 1871 cases Knox v. Lee and Parker v. Davis. In 1884, the Court, controlled 8–1 by Republicans, granted the federal government very broad power to issue Legal Tender paper through the case Juilliard v. Greenman, with only the lone remaining Democrat, Field, dissenting.

The states in the far west stayed loyal to the Union, but also had hard money sympathies. During the specie suspension from 1862 to 1878, western states used the gold dollar as a unit of account whenever possible and accepted greenbacks at a discount wherever they could. The preferred forms of paper money were gold certificates and National Gold Bank Notes, the latter having been created specifically to address the desire for hard money in California.

During the 1870s and 1880s, the Greenback Party existed for the primary purpose of advocating an increased circulation of United States Notes as a way of creating inflation according to the quantity theory of money. However, as the 1870s unfolded, the market price of silver decreased with respect to gold, and inflationists found a new cause in the Free Silver movement. Opposition to the resumption of specie convertibility of the Greenbacks during 1879 was accordingly muted.

== See also ==
- History of central banking in the United States
