= List of United States Supreme Court cases, volume 75 =

Supreme Court of the United States
- Interactive map of Supreme Court of the United States
- 38°53′26″N 77°00′16″W
- Established: March 4, 1789; 236 years ago
- Location: Washington, D.C.
- Coordinates: 38°53′26″N 77°00′16″W
- Composition method: Presidential nomination with Senate confirmation
- Authorised by: Constitution of the United States, Art. III, § 1
- Judge term length: life tenure, subject to impeachment and removal
- Number of positions: 9 (by statute)
- Website: supremecourt.gov

This is a list of cases reported in volume 75 (8 Wall.) of United States Reports, decided by the Supreme Court of the United States in 1869.

== Nominative reports ==
In 1874, the U.S. government created the United States Reports, and retroactively numbered older privately published case reports as part of the new series. As a result, cases appearing in volumes 1–90 of U.S. Reports have dual citation forms; one for the volume number of U.S. Reports, and one for the volume number of the reports named for the relevant reporter of decisions (these are called "nominative reports").

=== John William Wallace ===
Starting with the 66th volume of U.S. Reports, the Reporter of Decisions of the Supreme Court of the United States was John William Wallace. Wallace was Reporter of Decisions from 1863 to 1874, covering volumes 68 through 90 of United States Reports which correspond to volumes 1 through 23 of his Wallace's Reports. As such, the dual form of citation to, for example, Hudson Canal Co v. Pennsylvania Coal Co. is 75 U.S. (8 Wall.) 276 (1869).

Wallace's Reports were the final nominative reports for the US Supreme Court; starting with volume 91, cases were identified simply as "(volume #) U.S. (page #) (year)".

== Justices of the Supreme Court at the time of 75 U.S. (8 Wall.) ==
The Supreme Court is established by Article III, Section 1 of the Constitution of the United States, which says: "The judicial Power of the United States, shall be vested in one supreme Court . . .". The size of the Court is not specified; the Constitution leaves it to Congress to set the number of justices. Under the Judiciary Act of 1789 Congress originally fixed the number of justices at six (one chief justice and five associate justices). Since 1789 Congress has varied the size of the Court from six to seven, nine, ten, and back to nine justices (always including one chief justice).

To prevent President Andrew Johnson from appointing any justices, a hostile Congress passed the Judicial Circuits Act of 1866, eliminating three of the 10 seats from the Supreme Court as they became vacant, and so potentially reducing the size of the court to seven justices. The vacancy caused by the death of Justice John Catron in 1865 had not been filled, so after Justice James Moore Wayne died in July 1867 there were eight justices left on the court when the cases in 75 U.S. (8 Wall.) were decided:

Portrait	Justice	Office	Home State	Succeeded	Date confirmed by the Senate (Vote)	Tenure on Supreme Court
	Salmon P. Chase	Chief Justice	Ohio	Roger B. Taney	December 6, 1864 (Acclamation)	December 15, 1864 – May 7, 1873 (Died)
	Samuel Nelson	Associate Justice	New York	Smith Thompson	February 14, 1845 (Acclamation)	February 27, 1845 – November 28, 1872 (Retired)
	Robert Cooper Grier	Associate Justice	Pennsylvania	Henry Baldwin	August 4, 1846 (Acclamation)	August 10, 1846 – January 31, 1870 (Retired)
	Nathan Clifford	Associate Justice	Maine	Benjamin Robbins Curtis	January 12, 1858 (26–23)	January 21, 1858 – July 25, 1881 (Died)
	Noah Haynes Swayne	Associate Justice	Ohio	John McLean	January 24, 1862 (38–1)	January 27, 1862 – January 24, 1881 (Retired)
	Samuel Freeman Miller	Associate Justice	Iowa	Peter Vivian Daniel	July 16, 1862 (Acclamation)	July 21, 1862 – October 13, 1890 (Died)
	David Davis	Associate Justice	Illinois	John Archibald Campbell	December 8, 1862 (Acclamation)	December 10, 1862 – March 4, 1877 (Resigned)
	Stephen Johnson Field	Associate Justice	California	newly created seat	March 10, 1863 (Acclamation)	May 10, 1863 – December 1, 1897 (Retired)

== Citation style ==
Under the Judiciary Act of 1789 the federal court structure at the time comprised District Courts, which had general trial jurisdiction; Circuit Courts, which had mixed trial and appellate (from the US District Courts) jurisdiction; and the United States Supreme Court, which had appellate jurisdiction over the federal District and Circuit courts—and for certain issues over state courts. The Supreme Court also had limited original jurisdiction (i.e., in which cases could be filed directly with the Supreme Court without first having been heard by a lower federal or state court). There were one or more federal District Courts and/or Circuit Courts in each state, territory, or other geographical region.

Bluebook citation style is used for case names, citations, and jurisdictions.

- "C.C.D." = United States Circuit Court for the District of . . .
  - e.g.,"C.C.D.N.J." = United States Circuit Court for the District of New Jersey
- "D." = United States District Court for the District of . . .
  - e.g.,"D. Mass." = United States District Court for the District of Massachusetts
- "E." = Eastern; "M." = Middle; "N." = Northern; "S." = Southern; "W." = Western
  - e.g.,"C.C.S.D.N.Y." = United States Circuit Court for the Southern District of New York
  - e.g.,"M.D. Ala." = United States District Court for the Middle District of Alabama
- "Ct. Cl." = United States Court of Claims
- The abbreviation of a state's name alone indicates the highest appellate court in that state's judiciary at the time.
  - e.g.,"Pa." = Supreme Court of Pennsylvania
  - e.g.,"Me." = Supreme Judicial Court of Maine

== List of cases in 75 United States (8 Wall.) ==
Case Name	Page and year	Opinion of the Court	Concurring opinion(s)	Dissenting opinion(s)	Lower court	Disposition
Thorington v. Smith	1 (1869)	Chase	none	none	M.D. Ala.	reversed
Dean v. Younell's Administrator	14 (1869)	Chase	none	none	C.C.N.D. Ga.	affirmed
The Eagle	15 (1869)	Nelson	none	none	C.C.E.D. Mich.	affirmed
Mills v. Smith	27 (1869)	Grier	none	none	C.C.N.D. Ill.	affirmed
Stansbury v. United States	33 (1869)	Davis	none	none	Ct. Cl.	affirmed
Reeside v. United States	38 (1869)	Nelson	none	none	Ct. Cl.	reversed
Furman v. Nichol	44 (1869)	Davis	none	none	Tenn.	reversed
City of Memphis v. Dean	64 (1869)	Nelson	none	none	C.C.W.D. Tenn.	reversed
United States v. Speed	77 (1869)	Miller	none	none	Ct. Cl.	affirmed
Ex parte Yerger	85 (1869)	Chase	none	none	C.C.S.D. Miss.	affirmed
Nailor v. Williams	107 (1869)	Miller	none	none	Sup. Ct. D.C.	affirmed
Waring v. City of Mobile	110 (1869)	Clifford	none	none	Ala.	affirmed
Woodruff v. Parham	123 (1869)	Miller	none	Nelson	Ala.	affirmed
Hinson v. Lott	148 (1869)	Miller	none	none	Ala.	affirmed
The Propeller Mohawk	153 (1869)	Nelson	none	none	C.C.N.D. Ill.	affirmed
McKee v. United States	163 (1869)	Davis	none	none	S.D. Ill.	affirmed
Paul v. Virginia	168 (1869)	Field	none	none	Va.	affirmed
United States v. Lane	185 (1869)	Davis	none	none	Ct. Cl.	reversed
Seymour v. Freer	202 (1869)	Swayne	none	Field	C.C.N.D. Ill.	affirmed
Morey v. Lockwood	230 (1869)	Nelson	none	none	C.C.D. Mass.	affirmed
Drakely v. Gregg	242 (1869)	Davis	none	none	C.C.D. Md.	reversed
Gibbons v. United States	269 (1869)	Miller	none	none	Ct. Cl.	affirmed
Hudson Canal Company v. Pennsylvania Coal Company	276 (1869)	Clifford	none	none	C.C.S.D.N.Y.	affirmed
Patterson v. De la Ronde	292 (1869)	Field	none	none	C.C.D. La.	affirmed
The Carroll	302 (1869)	Davis	none	none	not indicated	affirmed
The Lucy	307 (1869)	Chase	none	none	S.D. Fla.	dismissed
Mandelbaum v. Nevada	310 (1869)	Nelson	none	none	Sup. Ct. Terr. Nev.	reversed
Gibson v. Chouteau	314 (1869)	Miller	none	none	Mo.	dismissed
Clark v. Reyburn	318 (1869)	Swayne	none	none	C.C.D. Kan.	reversed
The Lady Franklin	325 (1869)	Davis	none	none	C.C.N.D. Ill.	affirmed
United States v. Gilmore	330 (1869)	Chase	none	none	Ct. Cl.	reversed
American Wood-Paper Company v. Heft	333 (1869)	Nelson	none	none	C.C.E.D. Pa.	dismissed
Alviso v. United States	337 (1869)	Field	none	none	D. Cal.	affirmed
United States Express Company v. Kountze Brothers	342 (1869)	Davis	none	none	C.C.D. Neb.	affirmed
Young v. Martin	354 (1869)	Field	none	none	Sup. Ct. Terr. Utah	affirmed
Gilbert v. United States	358 (1869)	Miller	none	none	Ct. Cl.	affirmed
Kempner v. Churchill	362 (1869)	Grier	none	none	C.C.N.D. Ill.	affirmed
Mattingly v. Nye	370 (1869)	Swayne	none	none	Sup. Ct. D.C.	affirmed
Avendano v. Gay	376 (1869)	Miller	none	none	C.C.D. La.	affirmed
The Baltimore	377 (1869)	Clifford	none	none	Sup. Ct. D.C.	reversed
Bardley v. Rhines' Administrators	393 (1869)	Miller	none	none	C.C.W.D. Pa.	affirmed
Travelers' Insurance Company v. Mosley	397 (1869)	Swayne	none	Clifford	C.C.N.D. Ill.	affirmed
Blanchard v. Putnam	420 (1869)	Clifford	none	Swayne	C.C.S.D. Ohio	reversed
Home of the Friendless v. Rouse	430 (1869)	Davis	none	none	Mo.	reversed
Washington University v. Rouse	439 (1869)	Davis	none	Miller	Mo.	reversed
Bronson v. Kimpton	444 (1869)	Chase	none	none	N.Y.	reversed
Bennet v. Fowler	445 (1869)	Nelson	none	none	C.C.N.D. Ill.	affirmed
The Camanche	448 (1869)	Clifford	none	none	C.C.D. Cal.	affirmed
Allen v. Killinger	480 (1869)	Miller	none	Nelson	C.C.N.D. Ill.	reversed
Parish v. United States	489 (1869)	Field	none	none	Ct. Cl.	affirmed
Aldrich v. Aetna Insurance Company	491 (1869)	Nelson	none	none	N.Y.	reversed
Kennedy v. Gibson	498 (1869)	Swayne	none	none	C.C.D. Md.	affirmed
Morris's Cotton	507 (1869)	Clifford	none	none	M.D. Ala.	reversed
Carpenter v. Dexter	513 (1869)	Field	none	none	C.C.N.D. Ill.	affirmed
Veazie Bank v. Fenno	533 (1869)	Chase	none	Nelson	C.C.D. Me.	certification
Willard v. Tayloe	557 (1869)	Field	Chase	none	Sup. Ct. D.C.	reversed
Butz v. City of Muscatine	575 (1869)	Swayne	none	Miller	C.C.D. Iowa	reversed
United States v. Smith	587 (1869)	Grier	none	none	C.C.N.D. Ohio	certification
The Potomac	590 (1869)	Davis	none	none	C.C.D.N.Y.	affirmed
Drehman v. Stifle	595 (1869)	Swayne	none	none	Mo.	affirmed
Hepburn v. Griswold	603 (1869)	Chase	none	Miller	Ky.	affirmed
Broderick's Executor v. Magraw	639 (1869)	Chase	none	none	Cal.	affirmed
McVeigh v. United States	640 (1869)	per curiam	none	none	not indicated	dismissal denied
Chicopee Bank v. 7th National Bank	641 (1869)	Nelson	none	none	not indicated	affirmed
Maguire v. Tyler	650 (1869)	Clifford	none	none	Mo.	reversed

== See also ==
certificate of division
