= Anti-Gold Futures Act of 1864 =

The Anti-Gold Futures Act of 1864 (13 Stat. 132) was the first instance of United States Federal regulation of derivatives. More formally titled "An Act to Prohibit Certain Sales of Gold and Foreign Exchange," the Act was passed by Congress on June 17, 1864.

It was a response to Congressional perceptions that the low value the fiat currency greenbacks were then trading at relative to gold was as a result of a failure of the private market. The Act prohibited the trading of gold futures, and also criminalized the sale of foreign exchange more than ten days in the future. Congress's action was followed by a further sharp drop in the value of the greenbacks. Two weeks later Congress repealed the act.
