= List of United States Supreme Court cases, volume 79 =

Supreme Court of the United States
- Interactive map of Supreme Court of the United States
- 38°53′26″N 77°00′16″W
- Established: March 4, 1789; 236 years ago
- Location: Washington, D.C.
- Coordinates: 38°53′26″N 77°00′16″W
- Composition method: Presidential nomination with Senate confirmation
- Authorised by: Constitution of the United States, Art. III, § 1
- Judge term length: life tenure, subject to impeachment and removal
- Number of positions: 9 (by statute)
- Website: supremecourt.gov

This is a list of cases reported in volume 79 (12 Wall.) of United States Reports, decided by the Supreme Court of the United States in 1871 and 1872, and one case from 1870.

== Nominative reports ==
In 1874, the U.S. government created the United States Reports, and retroactively numbered older privately published case reports as part of the new series. As a result, cases appearing in volumes 1–90 of U.S. Reports have dual citation forms; one for the volume number of U.S. Reports, and one for the volume number of the reports named for the relevant reporter of decisions (these are called "nominative reports").

=== John William Wallace ===
Starting with the 66th volume of U.S. Reports, the Reporter of Decisions of the Supreme Court of the United States was John William Wallace. Wallace was Reporter of Decisions from 1863 to 1874, covering volumes 68 through 90 of United States Reports which correspond to volumes 1 through 23 of his Wallace's Reports. As such, the dual form of citation to, for example, Fowler v. Rathbones is 79 U.S. (12 Wall.) 102 (1871).

Wallace's Reports were the final nominative reports for the US Supreme Court; starting with volume 91, cases were identified simply as "(volume #) U.S. (page #) (year)".

== Justices of the Supreme Court at the time of 79 U.S. (12 Wall.) ==
The Supreme Court is established by Article III, Section 1 of the Constitution of the United States, which says: "The judicial Power of the United States, shall be vested in one supreme Court . . ". The size of the Court is not specified; the Constitution leaves it to Congress to set the number of justices. Under the Judiciary Act of 1789 Congress originally fixed the number of justices at six (one chief justice and five associate justices). Since 1789 Congress has varied the size of the Court from six to seven, nine, ten, and back to nine justices (always including one chief justice).

When the cases in 79 U.S. (12 Wall.) were decided the Court comprised these nine members:

Portrait	Justice	Office	Home State	Succeeded	Date confirmed by the Senate (Vote)	Tenure on Supreme Court
	Salmon P. Chase	Chief Justice	Ohio	Roger B. Taney	December 6, 1864 (Acclamation)	December 15, 1864 – May 7, 1873 (Died)
	Samuel Nelson	Associate Justice	New York	Smith Thompson	February 14, 1845 (Acclamation)	February 27, 1845 – November 28, 1872 (Retired)
	Nathan Clifford	Associate Justice	Maine	Benjamin Robbins Curtis	January 12, 1858 (26–23)	January 21, 1858 – July 25, 1881 (Died)
	Noah Haynes Swayne	Associate Justice	Ohio	John McLean	January 24, 1862 (38–1)	January 27, 1862 – January 24, 1881 (Retired)
	Samuel Freeman Miller	Associate Justice	Iowa	Peter Vivian Daniel	July 16, 1862 (Acclamation)	July 21, 1862 – October 13, 1890 (Died)
	David Davis	Associate Justice	Illinois	John Archibald Campbell	December 8, 1862 (Acclamation)	December 10, 1862 – March 4, 1877 (Resigned)
	Stephen Johnson Field	Associate Justice	California	newly created seat	March 10, 1863 (Acclamation)	May 10, 1863 – December 1, 1897 (Retired)
	William Strong	Associate Justice	Pennsylvania	Robert Cooper Grier	February 18, 1870 (No vote recorded)	March 14, 1870 – December 14, 1880 (Retired)
	Joseph P. Bradley	Associate Justice	New Jersey	newly created seat	March 21, 1870 (46–9)	March 23, 1870 – January 22, 1892 (Died)

== Notable Cases in 79 U.S. (12 Wall.) ==
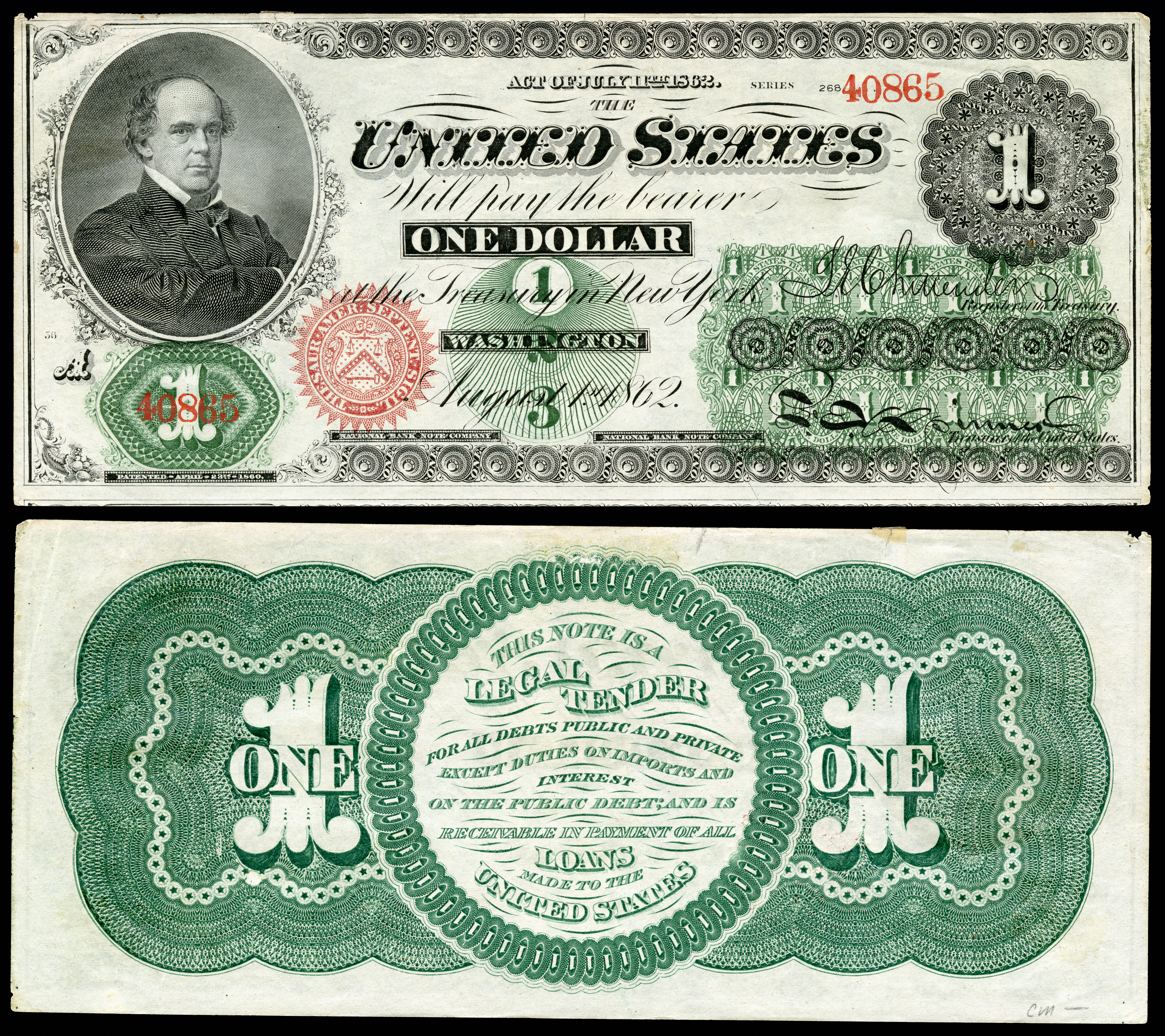
Legal Tender Note, 1862–63

=== Legal Tender Cases ===
The Legal Tender Cases 79 U.S. (12 Wall.) 457 (1871) were two consolidated cases that affirmed the constitutionality of paper money. The U.S. government had issued paper money known as United States Notes during the American Civil War under the Legal Tender Act of 1861. In the Legal Tender Cases the Court held that United States Notes could be used to re-pay pre-existing debts.

== Citation style ==
Under the Judiciary Act of 1789 the federal court structure at the time comprised District Courts, which had general trial jurisdiction; Circuit Courts, which had mixed trial and appellate (from the US District Courts) jurisdiction; and the United States Supreme Court, which had appellate jurisdiction over the federal District and Circuit courts—and for certain issues over state courts. The Supreme Court also had limited original jurisdiction (i.e., in which cases could be filed directly with the Supreme Court without first having been heard by a lower federal or state court). There were one or more federal District Courts and/or Circuit Courts in each state, territory, or other geographical region.

Bluebook citation style is used for case names, citations, and jurisdictions.

- "C.C.D." = United States Circuit Court for the District of . . .
  - e.g.,"C.C.D.N.J." = United States Circuit Court for the District of New Jersey
- "D." = United States District Court for the District of . . .
  - e.g.,"D. Mass." = United States District Court for the District of Massachusetts
- "E." = Eastern; "M." = Middle; "N." = Northern; "S." = Southern; "W." = Western
  - e.g.,"C.C.S.D.N.Y." = United States Circuit Court for the Southern District of New York
  - e.g.,"M.D. Ala." = United States District Court for the Middle District of Alabama
- "Ct. Cl." = United States Court of Claims
- The abbreviation of a state's name alone indicates the highest appellate court in that state's judiciary at the time.
  - e.g.,"Pa." = Supreme Court of Pennsylvania
  - e.g.,"Me." = Supreme Judicial Court of Maine

== List of cases in 79 U.S. (12 Wall.) ==
Case Name	Page & year	Opinion of the Court	Concurring opinion(s)	Dissenting opinion(s)	Lower Court	Disposition
Collector v. Hubbard	1 (1871)	Clifford	none	none	Conn.	reversed
Sturges v. Collector	19 (1871)	Clifford	none	none	C.C.D.N.Y.	affirmed
The Maria Martin	31 (1871)	Clifford	none	none	C.C.D. Wis.	affirmed
Philadelphia et al. R.R. Co. v. Dubois	47 (1871)	Strong	none	none	C.C.D. Md.	affirmed
Baltimore & O.R.R. Co. v. Harris	65 (1871)	Swayne	none	none	Sup. Ct. D.C.	affirmed
French v. Shoemaker	86 (1871)	Clifford	none	none	C.C.D. Va.	dismissal denied
Fowler v. Rathbones	102 (1871)	Clifford	none	none	C.C.S.D.N.Y.	affirmed
Noonan v. Bradley	121 (1871)	Clifford	none	none	C.C.D. Wis.	abatement denied
New Orleans M. Co. v. Flanders	130 (1870)	Clifford	none	none	C.C.E.D. La.	affirmed
The Eutaw	136 (1871)	Clifford	none	none	C.C.D.N.Y.	dismissal denied
Bigler v. Waller	142 (1871)	Clifford	none	none	C.C.D. Va.	dismissed
Baker v. Morton	150 (1871)	Clifford	none	none	C.C.D. Neb.	reversed
Miller v. New York	159 (1871)	Clifford	none	none	N.Y.	advancement denied
Ward v. Maryland	163 (1871)	Clifford	none	none	Md.	advancement denied
Merchants' Ins. Co. v. Huchbergers	164 (1871)	Chase	none	none	N.D. Ill.	affirmed
The Steamer Syracuse	167 (1871)	Davis	none	none	C.C.S.D.N.Y.	affirmed
Handlin v. Wickliffe	173 (1871)	Chase	none	none	La.	affirmed
United States v. Crusell	175 (1871)	Chase	none	none	Ct. Cl.	continued
United States v. Alexander	177 (1871)	Strong	none	none	Ct. Cl.	reversed
Hoffman Co. v. Bank of Milw.	181 (1871)	Clifford	none	none	C.C.D. Wis.	affirmed
Howard F. Ins. v. Norwich et al. Co.	194 (1871)	Strong	none	none	C.C.D. Conn.	affirmed
Western M. Ins. Co. v. Transportation Co.	201 (1871)	Strong	none	none	not indicated	affirmed
State Tonnage Tax Cases	204 (1871)	Clifford	none	none	Tex.	reversed
Junction R.R. Co. v. Bank of Ashland	226 (1871)	Bradley	none	none	C.C.D. Ind.	affirmed
United States v. Child Co.	232 (1871)	Miller	none	Clifford	Ct. Cl.	reversed
United States v. Burns	246 (1871)	Field	none	none	Ct. Cl.	affirmed
Holladay v. Kennard	254 (1871)	Bradley	none	none	C.C.S.D.N.Y.	affirmed
Germain v. Mason	259 (1871)	Miller	none	none	Sup. Ct. Terr. Mont.	joinder denied
Hannibal et al. R.R. v. Swift	262 (1871)	Field	none	none	C.C.D. Mo.	affirmed
Kearney v. Case	275 (1871)	Miller	none	none	C.C.D. La.	affirmed
Miller v. Brooklyn L. Ins. Co.	285 (1871)	Clifford	none	none	C.C.D. Md.	affirmed
Avery v. United States	304 (1871)	Davis	none	none	C.C.W.D. Tenn.	affirmed
Wadsworth v. Warren	307 (1871)	Strong	none	none	C.C.N.D. Ill.	affirmed
Perrin v. United States	315 (1871)	Clifford	none	none	Ct. Cl.	affirmed
Rogers v. Ritter	317 (1871)	Davis	none	none	C.C.D. Cal.	affirmed
Villa v. Rodriguez	323 (1871)	Swayne	none	none	C.C.D. Cal.	reversed
Hanauer v. Doane	342 (1871)	Bradley	none	none	C.C.E.D. Ark.	reversed
Thomas v. City of Richmond	349 (1871)	Bradley	none	none	C.C.D. Va.	affirmed
Smith v. Sheeley	358 (1871)	Davis	none	none	C.C.D. Neb.	affirmed
United States v. New Orleans R.R.	362 (1871)	Bradley	none	none	C.C.D. Ky.	affirmed
The Spray	366 (1871)	Davis	none	none	C.C.D. Cal.	affirmed
Shoemaker v. Kingsbury	369 (1871)	Field	none	none	C.C.D. Kan.	reversed
Knox v. Exchange Bank	379 (1871)	Miller	none	none	Va.	dismissed
Northern R.R. v. New York	384 (1871)	Miller	none	none	N.Y. Sup. Ct.	dismissed
The Western Metropolis	389 (1871)	Chase	none	none	C.C.D.N.Y.	commission granted
Parker v. Latey	390 (1871)	Clifford	none	none	C.C.D. Neb.	dismissed
Cooley v. O'Connor	391 (1871)	Strong	none	none	C.C.D.S.C.	reversed
Barth v. Clise	400 (1871)	Swayne	none	none	C.C.D. Wis.	affirmed
Phoenix Ins. Co. v. Slaughter	404 (1871)	Davis	none	none	C.C.S.D. Miss.	affirmed
Thorp v. Hammond	408 (1871)	Strong	none	none	C.C.S.D.N.Y.	reversed
Ward v. Maryland	418 (1871)	Clifford	Bradley	none	Md.	reversed
Insurance Cos. v. Boykin	433 (1871)	Miller	none	none	C.C.D.S.C.	reversed
Hennessy v. Sheldon	440 (1871)	Chase	none	none	C.C.E.D. Tex.	affirmed
Walker v. Dreville	440 (1871)	Miller	none	none	C.C.D. La.	dismissed
Scott v. United States	443 (1871)	Swayne	none	none	Ct. Cl.	affirmed
Edwards v. Tanneret	446 (1871)	Strong	none	none	C.C.D. La.	affirmed
The Patapsco	451 (1871)	Chase	none	none	C.C.S.D.N.Y.	dismissal denied
Hall v. Allen's Assignee	452 (1871)	Chase	none	none	C.C.D. Mo.	dismissed
New York v. Central R.R. Co.	455 (1871)	Chase	none	none	N.Y. Sup. Ct.	dismissed
Legal Tender Cases	457 (1871)	Strong	Bradley	Chase; Clifford; Field	multiple	affirmed
Bronson's Ex'r v. Chappell	681 (1871)	Swayne	none	none	C.C.D. Wis.	affirmed
Trebilcock v. Wilson	687 (1872)	Field	none	Bradley; Miller	Iowa	reversed
The Protector	700 (1872)	Chase	none	none	C.C.D. La.	dismissed

== See also ==
certificate of division
