= SS Nathan Clifford =

Liberty ship of WWII

History

United States
- Name: Nathan Clifford
- Namesake: Nathan Clifford
- Owner: War Shipping Administration (WSA)
- Operator: American Foreign Steamship Corp.
- Ordered: as type (EC2-S-C1) hull, MCE hull 944
- Awarded: 30 January 1942
- Builder: Bethlehem-Fairfield Shipyard, Baltimore, Maryland
- Cost: $1,072,829
- Yard number: 2094
- Way number: 12
- Laid down: 1 January 1943
- Launched: 18 February 1943
- Completed: 3 March 1943
- Identification: Call sign: KKAY
- Fate: Sold, 26 March 1947

United States
- Name: American Oriole
- Owner: American Foreign Steamship Corp.
- Fate: Sold, 1957

Liberia
- Name: Atlantic Oriole
- Owner: Atlantic Oriole SS Co.
- Operator: American Foreign Steamship Corp.
- Fate: Sold, 1961

Liberia
- Name: Kyma
- Owner: Marsuerte Cia. Nav. S.A, Panama
- Operator: Maritime Managers Co. (1961-1964); Admanthos Shipping Agency (1964-1965)
- Fate: Sold, 1965

Greece
- Name: Tassia
- Owner: Marsuerte Cia. Nav. S.A, Panama (1965); A.A. Catsogeorgis & Co. (1965)
- Fate: Sunk, 5 September 1965

General characteristics
- Class & type: Liberty ship; type EC2-S-C1, standard
- Tonnage: 10,865 LT DWT; 7,176 GRT
- Displacement: 3,380 long tons (3,434 t) (light); 14,245 long tons (14,474 t) (max)
- Length: 441 feet 6 inches (135 m) oa; 416 feet (127 m) pp; 427 feet (130 m) lwl
- Beam: 57 feet (17 m)
- Draft: 27 ft 9.25 in (8.4646 m)
- Installed power: 2 × Oil fired 450 °F (232 °C) boilers, operating at 220 psi (1,500 kPa); 2,500 hp (1,900 kW)
- Propulsion: 1 × triple-expansion steam engine, (manufactured by Ellicott Machine Corp., Baltimore, Maryland); 1 × screw propeller
- Speed: 11.5 knots (21.3 km/h; 13.2 mph)
- Capacity: 562,608 cubic feet (15,931 m^{3}) (grain); 499,573 cubic feet (14,146 m^{3}) (bale)
- Complement: 38–62 USMM; 21–40 USNAG
- Armament: Varied by ship; Bow-mounted 3-inch (76 mm)/50-caliber gun; Stern-mounted 4-inch (102 mm)/50-caliber gun; 2–8 × single 20-millimeter (0.79 in) Oerlikon anti-aircraft (AA) cannons and/or, 2–8 × 37-millimeter (1.46 in) M1 AA guns

SS Nathan Clifford was a Liberty ship built in the United States during World War II. She was named after Nathan Clifford, was an American statesman, diplomat and jurist. He represented Maine, in the US House of Representatives from 1839 to 1843, then served as the US Attorney General from 1846 to 1848, and as the US Ambassador to Mexico from 1848 to 1849. In the latter office, he signed the Treaty of Guadalupe Hidalgo. In 1858, he was appointed to be an Associate Justice of the Supreme Court of the United States, where he served until his death in 1881.

== Construction ==
Nathan Clifford was laid down on 1 January 1943, under a Maritime Commission (MARCOM) contract, MCE hull 944, by the Bethlehem-Fairfield Shipyard, Baltimore, Maryland; she was launched on 18 February 1943.

== History ==
She was allocated to the American Foreign Steamship Corp., on 3 March 1943.

On 26 May 1947, she was sold to American Foreign Steamship Corp., and renamed American Oriole. In 1957, she was sold and reflagged in Liberia, she was renamed Atlantic Oriole. She was renamed Kyma, in 1961, and Tassia, in 1965. On 5 September 1965, while en route from Amsterdam to Houston, she sprang a leak and sank.

Wreak location: 36°36′N 51°24′W

== Bibliography ==
- "Bethlehem-Fairfield, Baltimore MD". www.ShipbuildingHistory.com. 7 August 2021.
- Maritime Administration. "Nathan Clifford". Ship History Database Vessel Status Card. U.S. Department of Transportation, Maritime Administration.
- Davies, James (May 2004). "Specifications (As-Built)" (PDF). p. 23.
- "SS Nathan Clifford".
- Sawyer, L.A.; Mitchell, W.H. (1985). The Liberty Ships. Bury St. Edmunds, Suffolk, Great Britain: St. Edmundsbury Press Ltd. ISBN 1850440492.
