= Knox v. Lee =

- Supreme Court of the United States

Argued February 23 – April 18, 1871 Decided May 1, 1871
- Full case name: Knox v. Lee
- Citations: 79 U.S. 457 (more) 12 Wall. 457; 20 L. Ed. 287

Case history
- Prior: Hepburn v. Griswold

Holding
- Paper money as issued by the Legal Tender Act did not conflict with Article One of the United States Constitution.

Court membership
- Chief Justice Salmon P. Chase Associate Justices Samuel Nelson · Nathan Clifford; Noah H. Swayne · Samuel F. Miller; David Davis · Stephen J. Field; William Strong · Joseph P. Bradley

Case opinions
- Majority: Strong, joined by Swayne, Miller, Davis, Bradley
- Concurrence: Bradley
- Dissent: Chase, joined by Nelson
- Dissent: Clifford
- Dissent: Field
- This case overturned a previous ruling or rulings
- Hepburn v. Griswold (1870)

Knox v. Lee, 79 U.S. (12 Wall.) 457 (1871), was an important case for its time in which the Supreme Court of the United States overruled Hepburn v. Griswold. In Knox v. Lee, the Court held that making paper money legal tender through the Legal Tender Act did not conflict with Article I of the United States Constitution.

Mrs. Lee was a loyal citizen of the United States whose flock of sheep was sold by the Confederate Army, as the Confederates considered Mrs. Lee an "alien enemy". Mr. Knox purchased the sheep from the Confederate army, and Mrs. Lee brought suit for trespass and conversion. The Court instructed the jury that whatever amount they awarded could be paid with legal tender notes of the United States. Mr. Knox appealed, as he contended that this instruction was equivalent to telling the jury to add a premium for the discount of paper currency relative to specie.

Parker v. Davis was resolved in the same decision, in which Davis wished to compel specific performance requiring Parker to convey a lot to Davis in return for payment of money. The Court decreed that Davis should pay money into the Court, and Parker was to execute a deed to Davis. Davis paid United States notes, but Parker refused to execute a deed and claimed that he was entitled to receive coin.

== See also ==
- List of United States Supreme Court cases, volume 79
- Legal Tender Cases
- Willard v. Tayloe (1869)
- West v. Barnes (1791)
