= Nathan Clifford =

US Supreme Court justice from 1858 to 1881

- Clifford c. 1855–65

Associate Justice of the Supreme Court of the United States
- In office January 21, 1858 – July 25, 1881
- Nominated by: James Buchanan
- Preceded by: Benjamin Curtis
- Succeeded by: Horace Gray

United States Ambassador to Mexico
- In office October 2, 1848 – September 6, 1849
- President: James Polk; Zachary Taylor
- Preceded by: John Slidell
- Succeeded by: Robert Letcher

19th United States Attorney General
- In office October 17, 1846 – March 17, 1848
- President: James Polk
- Preceded by: John Mason
- Succeeded by: Isaac Toucey

Member of the U.S. House of Representatives from Maine's 1st district
- In office March 4, 1839 – March 3, 1843
- Preceded by: John Fairfield
- Succeeded by: Joshua Herrick

Attorney General of Maine
- In office January 1, 1834 – January 3, 1838
- Governor: Robert Dunlap
- Preceded by: Jonathan Rogers
- Succeeded by: Daniel Goodenow

Member of the Maine House of Representatives
- In office 1830-1834

Speaker of the Maine House of Representatives
- In office 1833-1834

Personal details
- Born: August 18, 1803 Rumney, New Hampshire, U.S.
- Died: July 25, 1881 (aged 77) Cornish, Maine, U.S.
- Resting place: Evergreen Cemetery
- Party: Democratic
- Spouse: Hannah Ayer

Nathan Clifford (August 18, 1803 – July 25, 1881) was an American lawyer, diplomat, and Democratic politician from Maine.

Clifford is one of the few people who have held a constitutional office in each of the three branches of the U.S. federal government. He was a U.S. representative from Maine (1839-1843), the U.S. attorney general (1846-1848) and ambassador to Mexico (1848-1849), and an associate justice of the U.S. Supreme Court (1858 -1881).

== Early life and education ==
Clifford was born on August 18, 1803, in Rumney, New Hampshire, to Deacon Nathaniel Clifford and his wife Lydia (née Simpson). He was the eldest and only son of seven children. His family were of old Yankee stock. In 1672, his great-great-grandmother Ann Smith was an accuser of Goody Cole, the only woman convicted of witchcraft in New Hampshire.

He attended the public schools of that town, then the Haverhill Academy in New Hampshire, and finally the New Hampton Literary Institute (now known as the New Hampton School).

== Early career ==
After teaching school for a time, he studied law in the offices of Josiah Quincy III and was admitted to the bar in Maine in 1827. He established his first practice in Newfield, Maine.

He served in the Maine House of Representatives from 1830 to 1834, and was Speaker of the House from 1833 to 1834. In 1834, the legislature elected him Maine Attorney General; he served from 1834 to 1838, when he entered national politics.

=== U.S. House of Representatives (1839–43) ===
In 1836, US Senator Ether Shepley resigned to become a justice of the Maine Supreme Judicial Court. Clifford contended for election to the vacancy, but the legislature chose Reuel Williams in March 1837. In 1838, Clifford was elected US Representative from Maine's 1st congressional district, and was re-elected in 1840. He served the 26th and 27th Congresses, from March 4, 1839 to March 3, 1843.

In Congress, he followed the Democratic party line on policies, and was a strong supporter of the Van Buren administration. Clifford was opposed to a high tariff, supported internal improvements, endorsed state banking, and was in favor of federal retrenchment. He also criticized abolitionism, saying that its supporters were well-intentioned, but denounced the "mean and incendiary schemes of political Abolitionists."

Due to re-redistricting and political infighting, Clifford was not a candidate for re-election in 1842.

== Polk administration ==
=== US Attorney General (1846–48) ===
In 1846, President James K. Polk appointed him 19th Attorney General of the United States after his predecessor, John Y. Mason, returned to being Secretary of the Navy. Clifford served in Polk's Cabinet from October 17, 1846, to March 17, 1848.

=== Ambassador to Mexico (1848–49) ===
Clifford resigned Attorney General to become US Envoy Extraordinary and Minister Plenipotentiary to Mexico, serving from March 18, 1848, to September 6, 1849. On behalf of the US, Clifford signed the Treaty of Guadalupe Hidalgo by which the United States acquired the Mexican Cession, which later formed the states of New Mexico, Arizona, California, Nevada, and Utah.

A Whig Presidential victory meant that Clifford was recalled to the United States. Following his service in the diplomatic corps, Clifford resumed the practice of law in Portland, Maine.

== Associate Justice of the Supreme Court (1858–81) ==
=== Appointment ===
On December 9, 1857, President James Buchanan nominated Clifford as an Associate Justice of the United States Supreme Court, to the seat vacated by Benjamin R. Curtis. Clifford's nomination came in the immediate wake of the Dred Scott v. Sandford decision and was hotly contested. The opposition labeled Clifford, a longtime partisan Democrat, a political hack and "doughface" (a Northern man with Southern sympathies). Anti-slavery representatives in the United States Senate fiercely opposed Clifford due to his pro-slavery record. After a 34-day-long confirmation process, the U.S. senate narrowly confirmed Clifford on January 12, 1858, by a 26–23 vote. He was sworn into office on January 21, 1858.

At the time Clifford joined the Court, all but one of the justices were affiliated with the Democratic Party. By 1872, Clifford had outlived his Democratic colleagues, and his new Republican colleagues tended to outvote him for his remaining nine years on the Court. Therefore, about one-fifth of all his opinions were in dissent. He wrote the majority opinion in 398 cases. His opinions were comprehensive essays on law and have sometimes been criticized as overly lengthy and digressive.

=== Legal philosophy ===
Justice Clifford rarely declared any legal philosophy about the U.S. Constitution but believed in a sharp dividing line between federal and state authority. One admirer, U.S. Senator James W. Bradbury, said Clifford's view was that the Constitution was not an "elastic instrument to be enlarged or impaired by construction, but to be fairly interpreted according to its terms, and sacredly maintained in all its provisions and limitations, as the best guaranty for the perpetuity of our republican institutions." Clifford supported a mechanical jurisprudence adhering to the strict text of the Constitution.

Clifford's fields of expertise were commercial and maritime law, Mexican land grants, and procedure and practice. Clifford's major contribution to constitutional interpretation may have been his dissent in Loan Association v. Topeka rejecting "natural law" or any ground other than clear constitutional provision as a basis for the Court to use to strike down legislative acts.

=== Civil War ===
During the Civil War, Clifford remained loyal to the Union. He distrusted federal authority, but generally upheld federal power as far as was necessary to prosecute the war. Some exceptions were the Prize Cases, where he joined the dissent in arguing that the blockade of the Confederacy was illegal without a declaration of war, and Ex parte Milligan, where he joined the majority to limit the use of military tribunals to prosecute citizens when civilian courts were available.

=== Reconstruction ===
During Reconstruction, Clifford continued his skepticism of the federal government, now unrestrained by any consideration for the exigencies of wartime emergency powers. He more readily voted to limit federal power and make it easier for the South to rejoin the Union. In Cummings v. Missouri and Ex parte Garland, Clifford joined the majority in outlawing test oaths as part of the conditions of returning to the Union.

==== Legal Tender cases ====
Perhaps Clifford's most prominent declaration against exercise of federal authority came in the Legal Tender cases. The cases dealt with the Legal Tender Act of 1862, passed to permit the issuance of paper money to pay war debts and establishing that paper currency would be valid as legal tender. In Hepburn v. Griswold (1870), a debtor whose note was made prior to the Act's passage challenged its application to her debt. Clifford joined the majority in a 5–3 decision holding that the Legal Tender Act could not constitutionally apply to preexisting debts.

Almost immediately after Griswold, the composition of the Supreme Court changed. Terminally ill Justice Robert Grier, who had joined the majority in Hepburn, resigned. President Ulysses S. Grant filled his seat with William Strong. The Court was also expanded by an Act of Congress from eight to nine members, with Joseph Bradley filling the new seat.

This change had an immediate impact on the pending case Knox v. Lee (1871). The case dealt with remuneration for goods confiscated by the Confederate Army. The lower court ruled that the plaintiff must be repaid in paper money and that the defendant had to pay the difference in the valuation of the goods in gold to greenbacks. Justice Clifford, joined by Justices Field and Nelson, dissented from the grant of certiorari, stating publicly, "I dissent from the order of the Court in these cases, especially from that part of it which opens for re-argument the question whether... the Legal Tender Act is constitutional as to contracts made before its passage—as I hold that the question is conclusively settled by the case of Hepburn vs Griswold..."

On May 1, 1871, the Court ruled 5–4 to overturn Hepburn v. Griswold and find the Legal Tender Act constitutional — facially and as applied to pre-existing debt. The four justices who formed the majority in Hepburn (minus the late Justice Grier) all dissented in Knox. The new justices, Bradley and Strong, were the deciding factor. Clifford submitted an 18,000 word dissent, angered that the Court would reverse its opinion in such a short amount of time. He also argued that the Legal Tender Act was facially unconstitutional, arguing that only hard money (gold and silver) with intrinsic value could serve as legal tender.

==== Reconstruction amendments ====
Clifford held to a limited interpretation of the Reconstruction amendments. He joined the majority in the Slaughter-House Cases (1873), which distinguished state and federal citizenship and held that the Fourteenth Amendment only protects the narrower rights of federal citizens. In Hall v. DeCuir (1878), Justice Clifford wrote a separate concurrence to uphold segregation on steamships, coining the phrase "equality is not identity." His concurrence may have foreshadowed the principle of "separate but equal" laid down after his death, in Plessy v. Ferguson (1893).

=== Compromise of 1877 ===
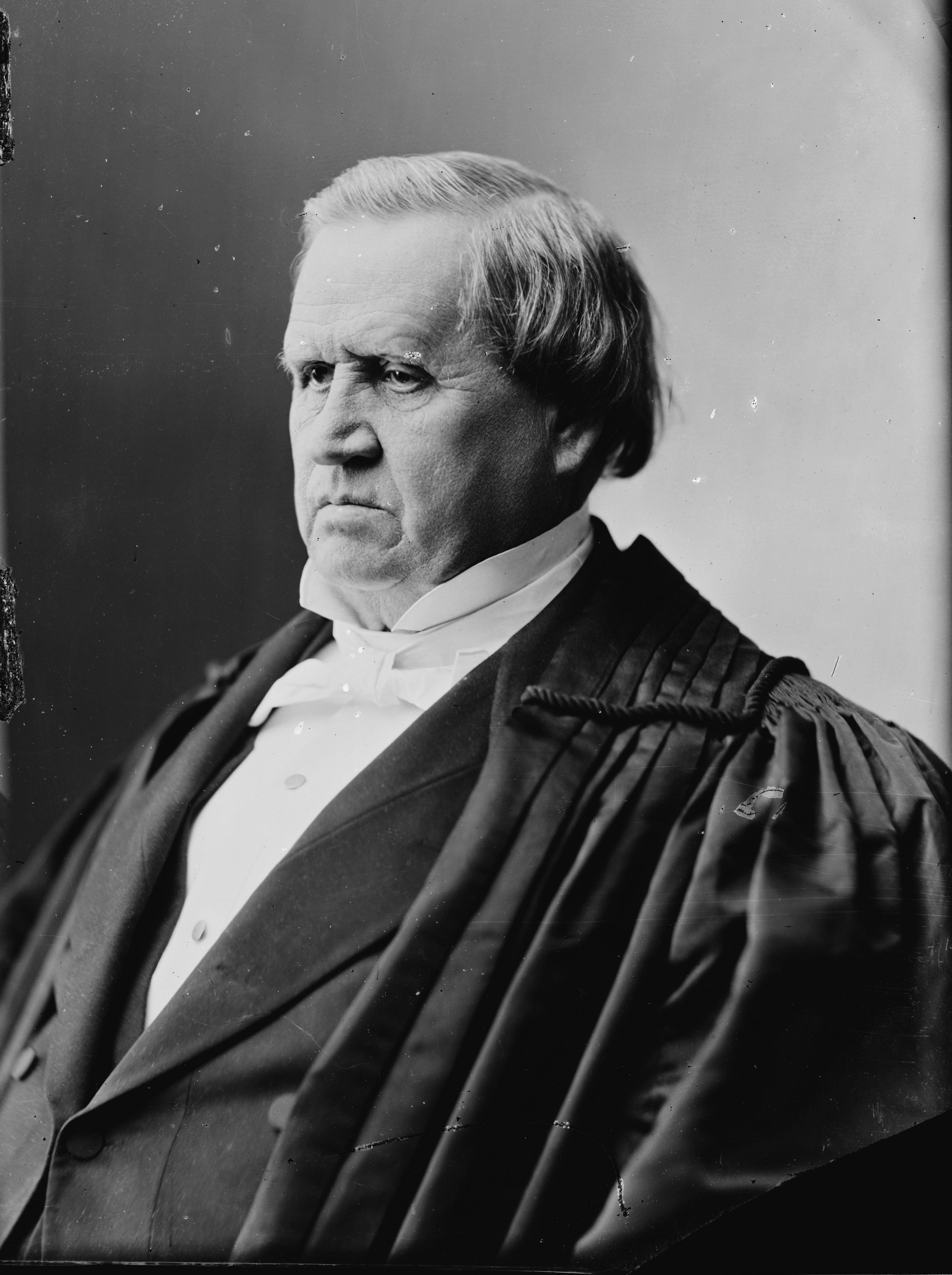
Nathan Clifford later in life

Clifford was president of the Electoral Commission convened in 1877 to determine the outcome of the 1876 presidential election. Clifford voted for fellow Democrat Samuel Tilden, but Rutherford B. Hayes won by a single vote.

Clifford believed that the commission erred in nullifying Tilden's apparent victory and never accepted Hayes as the lawful president. Still, he signed off on Hayes' order for inauguration. In this instance Clifford put the country before his strong party beliefs, and his personal hope of having a Democratic president choose his successor.

By 1877, Clifford's mental faculties had declined and impaired his ability to be an effective Justice. Justice Samuel Miller wrote that Clifford's mental deterioration was "obvious to all of the Court" and "in the work we do, no man ought to be there after 70." (Clifford was 74.) In 1880, Clifford experienced a stroke that, according to Miller, "rendered him a babbling idiot." He did not participate in any cases during that year, but still refused to step down, hoping that a Democratic president would be elected in 1880 and appoint a successor. He died on July 25, 1881, his successor on the bench, Horace Gray, instead being appointed by Republican president Chester Arthur.

== Personal life ==
As a young lawyer in Newfield, Clifford met his wife, Hannah Ayer. They had six children.

== Death and legacy ==
Clifford died on July 25, 1881, in Cornish, Maine, and is interred in Evergreen Cemetery in Portland.

The Nathan Clifford Elementary School in Portland is named for him. Clifford's son, William Henry Clifford, was a successful lawyer and an unsuccessful candidate for the Maine State House of Representatives. His grandson, also named Nathan Clifford, was also a lawyer and briefly president of the Maine State Senate.

The World War II Liberty Ship SS Nathan Clifford was named in his honor.

== See also ==
- List of justices of the Supreme Court of the United States

Legal offices
Preceded by Jonathan Rogers	Attorney General of Maine; 1834–1838	Succeeded by Daniel Goodenow
Preceded by John Mason	United States Attorney General; 1846–1848	Succeeded by Isaac Toucey
Preceded by Benjamin Curtis	Associate Justice of the Supreme Court of the United States; 1858–1881	Succeeded by Horace Gray
U.S. House of Representatives
Preceded by John Fairfield	Member of the U.S. House of Representatives from Maine's 1st congressional district 1839–1843	Succeeded by Joshua Herrick
Diplomatic posts
Preceded by John Slidell	United States Ambassador to Mexico; 1848–1849	Succeeded by Robert Letcher
