= Juilliard v. Greenman =

- Supreme Court of the United States

Submitted January 22, 1884 Decided March 3, 1884
- Full case name: Juilliard v. Greenman
- Citations: 110 U.S. 421 (more) 4 S. Ct. 122; 28 L. Ed. 204; 1884 U.S. LEXIS 1712

Holding
- The Legal Tender Acts are constitutional and apply in peacetime.

Court membership
- Chief Justice Morrison Waite Associate Justices Samuel F. Miller · Stephen J. Field; Joseph P. Bradley · John M. Harlan; William B. Woods · Stanley Matthews; Horace Gray · Samuel Blatchford

Case opinions
- Majority: Gray, joined by Waite, Miller, Bradley, Harlan, Woods, Matthews, Blatchford
- Dissent: Field

Juilliard v. Greenman, 110 U.S. 421 (1884), was a Supreme Court of the United States case in which issuance of greenbacks as legal tender in peacetime was challenged. The Legal Tender Acts of 1862 and 1863 were upheld.

Augustus D. Juilliard sold and delivered 100 bales of cotton to Thomas S. Greenman for $5,122.90. Greenman tendered $5,100 in United States legal tender notes and the rest in coin, but Juilliard would not accept the U.S. notes. The tendered notes were originally issued under an act of Congress passed on February 25, 1862, and March 3, 1863, during the Civil War. An act of May 31, 1878 provided to "forbid the further retirement of United States legal tender notes."

== Decision ==
In an 8–1 decision resting largely on prior court cases, particularly the jointly-decided cases Knox v. Lee (1871) and Parker v. Davis (1871), the power "of making the notes of the United States a legal tender in payment of private debts" was interpreted as "included in the power to borrow money and to provide a national currency".

== Dissenting opinion ==
Justice Field dissented, challenging the court's interpretation of the terms to "borrow" and to "coin" money.

He explained that the term to borrow money was well settled in other instruments, such as municipal and corporate bonds and private contracts. He contended that allowing the government to make their notes legal tender would interfere with third-party contractual obligations, as third parties would be compelled by law to accept notes instead of coin. He argued that a private corporate bond could not require an amusement park to accept the bond in exchange for entry. To find that the term to borrow money as written in the Constitution, according to him, would allow interference in third-party contracts and improve the value of the note, but it would deviate from the meaning of the term "to borrow money".

He asserted that the meaning of the terms "to coin money" was certain: "It is to mould metallic substances into forms convenient for circulation and to stamp them with the impress of the government." He argued that in the clause authorizing Congress "to provide for the punishment of counterfeiting the securities and current coin of the United States," a distinction was clearly made between debt and coin.

He also cited many quotes by the founders against paper money, including the following by James Madison: "The pretext for paper currency, and particularly for making the bills a tender either for public or private debts, was cut off."

Finally, Justice Field wrote "For nearly three-quarters of a century after the adoption of the Constitution, and until the legislation during the recent civil war, no jurist and no statesman of any position in the country ever pretended that a power to impart the quality of legal tender to its notes was vested in the general government. There is no recorded word of even one in favor of its possessing the power. All conceded, as an axiom of constitutional law, that the power did not exist."

== See also ==
- Legal Tender Cases
