= Legal Tender Cases =

United States Supreme Court cases

The Legal Tender Cases were two 1871 United States Supreme Court cases that affirmed the constitutionality of paper money. The two cases were Knox v. Lee and Parker v. Davis.

The U.S. federal government had issued paper money known as United States Notes during the American Civil War, pursuant to the terms of the Legal Tender Act of 1862. In the 1869 case of Hepburn v. Griswold, the Court had held that parts of the Legal Tender Act violated the Due Process Clause of the Fifth Amendment to the United States Constitution. In his majority opinion, Chief Justice Salmon P. Chase did not hold that Congress lacked the power to issue paper money, but rather that the notes could not be used as legal tender for pre-existing debts. The Supreme Court overruled Hepburn v. Griswold in the Legal Tender Cases, holding that United States Notes could be used to repay preexisting debts.

== Legal Tender Act of 1862 ==
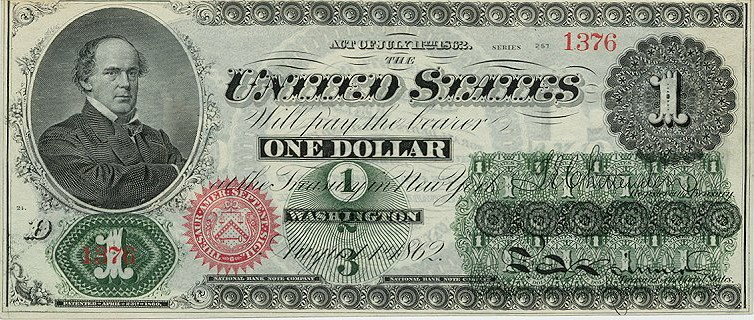
Obverse of the first $1 bill, issued in 1862 as a legal tender note featuring Treasury Secretary Chase, who later held as Chief Justice that such bills are unconstitutional, before being overturned

The Legal Tender Cases primarily involved the constitutionality of the Legal Tender Act of 1862, 12 Stat. 345, enacted during the American Civil War. This Act authorized issuance of $150,000,000 in United States Notes, commonly referred to as greenbacks, plus $500,000,000 in interest-bearing bonds. The paper money depreciated in terms of gold and became the subject of controversy, particularly because debts contracted earlier could be paid in this cheaper currency.

Chief Justice Chase described the sequence of events:

Now then let it be considered what has actually been done in the provision of a national currency. In July and August, 1861, and February, 1862, the issue of sixty millions of dollars in United States notes, payable on demand, was authorized. They were made receivable in payments, but were not declared a legal tender until March, 1862, when the amount in circulation had been greatly reduced by receipt and cancellation. In 1862 and 1863 the issue of four hundred and fifty millions in United States notes, payable not on demand, but in effect at the convenience of the government, was authorized, subject to certain restrictions as to fifty millions. These notes were made receivable for the bonds of the national loans, for all debts due to or from the United States, except duties on imports and interest on the public debt, and were also declared a legal tender. In March, 1863, the issue of notes for parts of a dollar was authorized to an amount not exceeding fifty millions of dollars. These notes were not declared a legal tender, but were made redeemable under regulations to be prescribed by the Secretary of the Treasury. In February, 1863, the issue of three hundred millions of dollars in notes of the national banking associations was authorized. These notes were made receivable to the same extent as United States notes, and provision was made to secure their redemption, but they were not made a legal tender.

== Hepburn v. Griswold ==
In Hepburn v. Griswold (1870), Chief Justice Salmon P. Chase held for a 5–3 majority of the Court that the Act was an unconstitutional violation of the Due Process Clause of the Fifth Amendment:

It is quite clear, that whatever may be the operation of such an act, due process of law makes no part of it. Does it deprive any person of property? A very large proportion of the property of civilized men exists in the form of contracts. These contracts almost invariably stipulate for the payment of money. And we have already seen that contracts in the United States, prior to the act under consideration, for the payment of money, were contracts to pay the sums specified in gold and silver coin.

We are obliged to conclude that an act making mere promises to pay dollars a legal tender in payment of debts previously contracted, is not a means appropriate, plainly adapted, really calculated to carry into effect any express power vested in Congress; that such an act is inconsistent with the spirit of the Constitution; and that it is prohibited by the Constitution.

Ironically, Chief Justice Chase had played a role in formulating the Legal Tender Act of 1862, in his previous position as Secretary of the Treasury. On the same day that Hepburn was decided, President Ulysses Grant nominated two new justices to the Court, Joseph Bradley and William Strong, although Grant later denied that he had known about the decision in Hepburn when the nominations were made.

== Knox v. Lee and Parker v. Davis ==
Justices Bradley and Strong subsequently voted to reverse the Hepburn decision, in Knox v. Lee and Parker v. Davis, by votes of 5–4.

== Juilliard v. Greenman ==
The constitutionality of the Act was more broadly upheld thirteen years later in Juilliard v. Greenman.

== Background about constitutionality of paper money ==
Article I, Section 10 of the Constitution explicitly forbids the states from issuing "bills of credit" (promissory notes) or making anything but gold and silver coin legal "tender". There are no corresponding explicit prohibitions limiting the power of the federal government, nor are there any explicit authorizations. The Tenth Amendment refers to reserved powers that only the states can exercise, as well as powers not delegated that continue to reside in the people. "Concurrent powers" also exist, which may be exercised by either the states or the federal government, such as the power to repel invasions, and arguably including power to make legal tender (e.g. in federal territories or elsewhere). Article I, Section 8 of the Constitution specifically gives Congress power to "borrow money" and also power to "coin money and regulate the value" of both U.S. and foreign coins, and regulate interstate commerce, but does not explicitly and unambiguously grant Congress the power to print paper money or make it legal tender.

The federal government first issued paper money in 1861 to fund the Civil War. Before that, all U.S. paper money was bank-issued money. For example, paper notes were issued by the First Bank of the United States, which was a private corporation chartered by the federal government. Congress had also authorized paper money (e.g. Continentals) even before the Constitution was adopted. The Continental was issued by both the individual states and the Continental Congress under the Articles of Confederation. Those Articles specifically allowed the issuance of legal tender paper money, at the time called "bills of credit".

In Hepburn, Chief Justice Chase noted, "No one questions the general constitutionality, and not very many, perhaps, the general expediency of the legislation by which a note currency has been authorized in recent years. The doubt is as to the power to declare a particular class of these notes to be a legal tender in payment of pre-existing debts."

=== Original intent and original meaning ===
Originalists like Robert Bork have objected to enforcing the intentions of those framers who may have believed that paper money should be prohibited: "Scholarship suggests that the Framers intended to prohibit paper money. Any judge who thought today he would go back to the original intent really ought to be accompanied by a guardian rather than be sitting on a bench." According to law professor Michael Stokes Paulson, "Among the most common canards in critiques of originalism is that, under the original meaning of the Constitution, the issuance of paper money as legal tender would be unconstitutional, sending our economy into disarray."

Regarding paper money, Nathaniel Gorham explained at the Constitutional Convention that he "was for striking out" an explicit power of Congress to issue paper money, but Gorham was also against "inserting any prohibition". That is what ultimately happened at the convention: language explicitly giving the federal government power to issue legal tender paper money was removed on a vote of 9–2, but an option allowing the issuance together with a prohibition against making it legal tender was not acted upon. Article I, Section 8 of the Constitution gives Congress power to "borrow money on the credit of the United States", and therefore Gorham envisioned that "The power [e.g. to emit promissory paper], as far as it will be necessary or safe, is involved in that of borrowing." The power to emit paper money (e.g. bank notes) has been justified by invoking the Necessary and Proper Clause in combination with the other enumerated powers which include the power to borrow money. The power to "issue bills of credit" is explicitly mentioned in the Constitution as a prohibition on the States, and could therefore be interpreted as a power so momentous that it would have to be conferred explicitly on the federal government rather than inferred from the Necessary and Proper Clause, although it is not entirely clear whether or not the framers intended such an interpretation, nor did the Supreme Court adopt such an interpretation in the Legal Tender Cases or subsequently.

James Madison's notes, from the Constitutional Convention in 1787, include a footnote where he says that the Constitution would not allow the federal government to use paper as currency or legal tender, though there is no indication whether or not the contents of his footnote were uttered aloud at the convention. Thereafter, during the ratification debates, the Federalist Papers No. 44 (assumed to be authored by Madison) said that prohibiting states from emitting "bills of credit must give pleasure to every citizen, in proportion to his love of justice and his knowledge of the true springs of public prosperity." He further stated that the issuance of paper money by the states had resulted in "an accumulation of guilt, which can be expiated no otherwise than by a voluntary sacrifice of the power which has been the instrument of it."

== See also ==
- Legal tender
- Commodity money
- Demand Note
- Federal Reserve Note
- Fiat money
- List of United States Supreme Court cases, volume 79
- United States Note
