= Timeline of the Andrew Johnson presidency =

The presidency of Andrew Johnson began on April 15, 1865, when Andrew Johnson became president of the United States upon the assassination of President Abraham Lincoln, and ended on March 4, 1869.

== 1865 ==
=== April 1865 ===
- April 15
  - Andrew Johnson becomes president of the United States when Abraham Lincoln is assassinated. Johnson is inaugurated as the seventeenth president at the Kirkwood House.
  - Johnson retains Lincoln's cabinet: William H. Seward as secretary of state, Hugh McCulloch as secretary of the treasury, Edwin Stanton as secretary of war, James Speed as attorney general, William Dennison Jr. as postmaster general, Gideon Welles as secretary of the navy, and John Palmer Usher as secretary of the interior. Seward, McCulloch, and Welles will stay for Johnson's entire presidency.
- April 16 – Johnson nominates Henry Stanbery to the Supreme Court. No vote will be held to confirm the nomination.
- April 17 – Johnson delivers a public address on his becoming the president.
- April 18 – Johnson rejects the Confederate States of America's surrender because he considers the terms too lenient. The decision is supported by his cabinet.
- April 21 – A funeral train for Abraham Lincoln departs from Washington, D.C. for Springfield, Illinois.
- April 26
  - Confederate General Joseph E. Johnston surrenders to Union General William Tecumseh Sherman under new terms.
  - Lincoln's assassin John Wilkes Booth is found at a tobacco barn in Virginia and killed by Union soldiers.

=== May 1865 ===
- May 1 – Johnson issues an executive order saying that people involved in Lincoln's assassination can be tried by a military commission.
- May 2 – Johnson issues a proclamation setting rewards for the arrest of Confederate leaders Jefferson Davis, Jacob Thompson, and Clement Claiborne Clay.
- May 3 – Johnson issues an executive order lifting the ban on trading weapons and animals with the Confederacy.
- May 10 – Jefferson Davis, the president of the Confederacy, is arrested for treason. He is also arrested for involvement in Lincoln's assassination, but it was later determined that he was uninvolved.
- May 15 – James Harlan succeeds John Palmer Usher as secretary of the interior.
- May 23 – Johnson leads the Grand Review of the Armies victory celebration in Washington, D.C. where he reviews the Army of the Potomac and the Army of the Tennessee.
- May 29 – Johnson issues a proclamation granting a pardon and the return of seized property to any citizen of the Confederacy, besides political leaders and the wealthy, who takes an oath of loyalty. He also issues a proclamation to set the rules of Reconstruction for North Carolina, including a recommendation of new state constitutions and provisional governors for Confederate states. He appoints William Woods Holden as the provisional governor of North Carolina.
- May 31 – The United States joins several European nations in a convention with Morocco in regard to the lighthouse of Cape Spartel.

=== June 1865 ===
- June 9 – Johnson moves into the White House.
- June 13
  - Johnson appoints William L. Sharkey as the provisional governor of Mississippi.
  - Johnson issues a proclamation lifting trade restrictions on Confederate states east of the Mississippi River.
- June 23 – Johnson issues a proclamation lifting remaining trade restrictions on territory east of the Mississippi River.

=== July 1865 ===
- July 25 – Samuel Milligan is confirmed to the United States Court of Claims.

=== August 1865 ===
- August 12 – The United States signs a treaty with the Walpapi people.

=== September 1865 ===
- September 16 – Johnson orders the military to transport materials for the Freedmen's Bureau.
- September 29 – The United States signs a treaty with the Osage people.

=== October 1865 ===
- October 2 – Johnson issues a proclamation to end martial law in Kentucky.
- October 10 – The United States signs a treaty with the Miniconjou Sioux.
- October 14 – The United States signs a treaty with the Lower Brule Sioux and a treaty with the Cheyenne and Arapaho.
- October 17 – The United States signs a treaty with the Apache, Cheyenne, and Arapaho.
- October 18 – The United States signs a treaty with the Kiowa and Comanche.
- October 19 – The United States signs a treaty with the Two Kettles Sioux and the Blackfeet Sioux .
- October 20 – The United States signs a treaty with the Sans Arcs Sioux, the Hunkpapa Sioux, and the Yanktonai Sioux.
- October 28 – The United States signs a treaty with the Upper Yanktonai Sioux and the Oglala Sioux.

=== November 1865 ===
- November 15 – The United States signs a treaty with the Confederated Tribes of Middle Oregon.

=== December 1865 ===
- December 1 – Johnson issues a proclamation ending the suspension of habeas corpus in non-Confederate states.
- December 2 – Mississippi is the first state to adopt a Black Code that restricts the rights of black Americans.
- December 4
  - The 39th United States Congress convenes for its first session.
  - Johnson delivers the 1865 State of the Union Address.
- December 12 – Mississippi provisional governor William L. Sharkey becomes the first of the provisional governors to be succeeded by an elected governor.
- December 24 – The Ku Klux Klan is created by Confederate veterans in Pulaski, Tennessee.

== 1866 ==
=== February 1866 ===
- February 19 – Johnson vetoes the Freedmen's Bureau Renewal Act, which would increase the influence of the Freedmen's Bureau organization that provides aid to black Americans. The veto will be upheld by two votes.
- February 22 – Johnson speaks about Reconstruction during celebrations of George Washington's birthday. He says that Confederate states are entitled to Congressional representation and that attempting to deny this is treasonous. He names three members of the Radical Republican, a faction of the Republican Party, as treasonous: Thaddeus Stevens, Charles Sumner, and Wendell Phillips.

=== March 1866 ===
- March 21 – The United States signs a treaty with the Seminole.
- March 27 – Johnson vetoes the Civil Rights Act of 1866 that would grand citizenship to black Americans. He says that it is racially biased against white people and that it interferes with local laws.
- March 29 – The United States signs a treaty with the Potawatomi.

=== April 1866 ===
- April 3 – The Supreme Court issues its decision in Ex parte milligan. It rules that civilians cannot be tried by a military tribunal in times of war if civil courts are open.
- April 5 – Johnson asks Congress to modify the oath of office to omit mention of whether the officeholder engaged in rebellion.
- April 7 – The United States signs a treaty with the Bois Fort Band Chippewa.
- April 9 – Congress overrides Johnson's veto of the Civil Rights Act.
- April 28 – The United States signs a treaty with the Choctaw and Chickasaw.

=== May 1866 ===
- May 1 – White residents of Memphis, Tennessee, launch an attack against black neighborhoods in the city.
- May 3 – The attack against black neighborhoods ends in Memphis, with 46 black residents killed.

=== June 1866 ===
- June 1 – The Battle of Ridgeway occurs when the Fenian Brotherhood, an American Irish nationalist organization, launches a raid against British Canada. Johnson issues a proclamation asking Americans not to participate.
- June 14 – The United States signs a treaty with the Creek people.
- June 19 – Congress passes the Fourteenth Amendment to the United States Constitution, which will grant citizenship to black Americans, establish birthright citizenship, and bar Confederate leadership from holding office. It effectively overturns the Supreme Court decision in Dred Scott v. Sandford.
- June 25 – The United States joins European nations in a convention with Japan on tariffs.

=== July 1866 ===
- July – Attorney General James Speed, Postmaster General William Dennison Jr., and Secretary of the Interior James Harlan resign from the cabinet in protest of Johnson's policies.
- July 4 – The United States signs a treaty with the Delaware people.
- July 16 – Johnson vetoes another bill to expand the Freedmen's Bureau. Congress overrides the veto the same day.
- July 17 – James Speed and William Dennison end their tenures as attorney general and postmaster general, respectively.
- July 19 – The United States signs a treaty with the Cherokee.
- July 23 – Henry Stanbery becomes attorney general, filling the vacancy left by James Speed.
- July 24 – Johnson declares that Tennessee may be readmitted as a state once it ratifies the Fourteenth Amendment.
- July 25 – Alexander Randall becomes postmaster general, filling the vacancy left by William Dennison.
- July 28 – The 39th United States Congress adjourns from its first session.
- July 30 – Delegates to a Louisiana constitutional convention are attacked in New Orleans. This escalates into a violent racial conflict that leaves 37 people dead. General Philip Sheridan reports that the violence was not a riot but "an absolute massacre by the police".

=== August 1866 ===
- August 20 – Johnson issues a proclamation declaring a state of peace in the United States.
- August 28 – Johnson begins his Swing Around the Circle speaking tour in the Eastern and Midwestern states. He discusses his Reconstruction policies and expresses opposition to the Fourteenth Amendment.

=== September 1866 ===
- September 1 – Orville Hickman Browning succeeds James Harlan as secretary of the interior.
- September 3 – Johnson says that the Southern states are ready to be readmitted during his speech in Buffalo, New York.
- September 4 – While speaking in Cleveland, Johnson responds to a man yelling for the hanging of Jefferson Davis by proposing the hanging of Thad Stevens and Wendell Phillips, two of his opponents in Congress. The comment prompts a negative reaction from the press.
- September 7 – Illinois Governor Richard J. Oglesby and the Chicago City Council boycott Johnson's speech in Chicago.
- September 9 – While speaking in St. Louis, Johnson accuses Radical Republicans of causing the racial violence in New Orleans.
- September 10 – Johnson's speech in Indianapolis is followed by riots that leave one person dead.
- September 14 – A temporary platform collapses at Johnson's speech in Johnstown, Pennsylvania, killing thirteen people. He is accused of indifference after his departure from Johnstown and media criticism of Johnson increases further.
- September 15 – Johnson returns to Washington, D.C. at the end of his Swing Around the Circle speaking tour.

=== November 1866 ===
- November 2 – Johnson issues an executive order demanding that the military prepare for the possibility of insurrection to interfere with elections in the city.
- November 6 – The 1866 United States elections take place. Republicans win a supermajority in both chambers of Congress as Northern voters oppose the continued racism in Southern states.

=== December 1866 ===
- December 3 – The 39th United States Congress convenes for its second session.

== 1867 ==
=== January 1867 ===
- January 5 – Johnson vetoes District of Columbia Suffrage Act that would give black Americans the right to vote in Washington, D.C.
- January 8 – Congress overrides Johnson's veto of the Washington D.C. enfranchisement bill.
- January 14 – The Supreme Court issues its decisions in Cummings v. Missouri and Ex parte Garland. It rules that state and federal law cannot require an oath that one has never aided the Confederacy, determining that this a punitive measure that violates the constitution's ban on bills of attainder and ex post facto laws.
- January 27 – Johnson vetoes a bill that would admit Nebraska as a state because it required Nebraska to enfranchise nonwhite citizens as a condition for statehood.

=== February 1867 ===
- February 8 – The United States signs a convention of amity, commerce, navigation, and extradition with the Dominican Republic.
- February 9 – Congress overrides Johnson's veto of the Nebraska statehood bill.
- February 14 – The United States enters into a treaty of commerce with Madagascar.
- February 18 – The United States signs a treaty with the Sauk and Fox peoples.
- February 19 – The United States signs a treaty with the Sisseton Sioux and the Wahpeton Sioux.
- February 23 – The United States signs a treaty with the Seneca, the Mixed Seneca and Shawnee, the Quapaw, the Confederated Peoria, Kaskaskia, Wea, and Piankashaw, the Miami, the Ottawa of Blanchard's Fork and Roche de Boeuf, and the Wyandot.
- February 27 – The United States signs a treaty with the Potawatomi.

=== March 1867 ===
- March 1 – Nebraska is admitted as the thirty-seventh state.
- March 2
  - Johnson vetoes the Tenure of Office Act, which would remove the president's ability to remove members of the cabinet without Senate approval. Congress overrides the veto the same day. Secretary of War Edwin Stanton is a Radical Republican, and Congress's mostly Radical Republican members wish to protect his position.
  - Johnson vetoes the First Reconstruction Act, which would establish military districts in the Southern states. Congress overrides the veto the same day.
  - The Army Appropriations Act of 1867 reduces presidential power over the army.
- March 3 – The 39th United States Congress adjourns from its second session.
- March 4 – The 40th United States Congress convenes for its first session.
- March 19 – The United States signs a treaty with the Chippewa of the Mississippi.
- March 23 – Johnson vetoes the Second Reconstruction Act. Congress overrides the veto the same day.
- March 30
  - The Alaska Purchase is signed between the Russian Empire and the United States, an agreement that allows the United States to purchase present-day Alaska for $7.2 million.
  - Johnson issues a proclamation calling the Senate to convene for a special session.

=== April 1867 ===
- April – Local Ku Klux Klan groups from the Southern states send delegates to a secret convention in Nashville, Tennessee. Confederate General Nathan Bedford Forrest is reportedly named Grand Wizard at the convention.
- April 15 – The Supreme Court issues its decision in Mississippi v. Johnson. It rules that the court does not have the power to restrict the president from enforcing the laws and can only obligate him to fulfill constitutional responsibilities.

=== May 1867 ===
- May 13 – Confederate President Jefferson Davis is moved from military to civilian custody and released on bail.

=== June 1867 ===
- June 1 – Johnson departs on a speaking tour of Virginia and North Carolina.
- June 8 – Johnson's southern speaking tour ends.
- June 21
  - Johnson departs on a speaking tour of New Jersey, New York, Pennsylvania, Massachusetts, Maryland, and Connecticut.
  - The United States signs a treaty of friendship, commerce, and navigation with Nicaragua.
- June 28 – Johnson's northern speaking tour ends.

=== July 1867 ===
- July 19
  - Johnson vetoes the Third Reconstruction Act, which would codify Congressional authority over Reconstruction and set rules for elections in Southern states. Congress overrides the veto the same day.
  - Johnson vetoes a joint resolution funding the Reconstruction Acts.

=== August 1867 ===
- August 5 – Johnson asks Secretary of War Edwin Stanton to resign over his opposition to Johnson's stance on Reconstruction. Stanton does not resign.
- August 12 – Johnson puts Secretary of War Edwin Stanton in suspension under the terms of the Tenure of Office Act. Has General Ulysses S. Grant serve as acting secretary of war.
- August 28 – The United States annexes Midway Atoll.

=== October 1867 ===
- October 21 – The United States signs the Medicine Lodge Treaty with the Kiowa, Comanche, and Apache.
- October 28 – The United States signs the Medicine Lodge Treaty with the Cheyenne and Arapaho.

=== December 1867 ===
- December 1 – The 40th United States Congress adjourns from its first session.
- December 2 – The 40th United States Congress convenes for its second session.
- December 3 – Johnson delivers the 1867 State of the Union Address. It includes a defense of his position on Reconstruction.
- December 12 – Johnson delivers a message to the Senate justifying his suspension of Secretary of War Edwin Stanton.
- December 17 – The United States signs a treaty of amity and commerce with Thailand.

== 1868 ==
=== January 1868 ===
- January 13 – The Senate rejects Johnson's suspension of Secretary of War Edwin Stanton. Stanton is reinstated.
- January 14 – Acting Secretary of War Ulysses S. Grant returns the position to Edwin Stanton.
- January 27 – The United States signs a treaty of trademarks with Russia.

=== February 1868 ===
- February 8 – The United States signs a treaty of rights, privileges, and immunities of consular officers with Italy.
- February 21 – Johnson removes Secretary of War Edwin Stanton in violation of the Tenure of Office Act that had been passed to protect Stanton's position. Stanton responds by locking himself in his office for the next two months. Johnson names General Lorenzo Thomas as acting secretary.
- February 22 – The United States signs a Bancroft Treaty of naturalization with the North German Confederation.
- February 24 – The House of Representatives votes to impeach Johnson for violating the Tenure of Office Act. All 126 Republicans vote in favor of impeachment, and all 47 Democrats vote against it.

=== March 1868 ===
- March 2 – The United States signs a treaty with the Ute people.
- March 4 – The House drafts eleven articles of impeachment against Johnson.
- March 5 – The impeachment trial of Andrew Johnson begins in the Senate.
- March 13 – Henry Stanberry ends his tenure as attorney general.
- March 23
  - The Supreme Court issues its decision in Grisar v. McDowell. It rules that the president can remove federal land from the market and set it aside for public use.
  - The United States signs a treaty of extradition with Italy.
- March 25 – Johnson vetoes a bill that would have amended the Judiciary Act of 1789 by reducing the Supreme Court's jurisdiction over appellate cases.
- March 27 – Congress overrides Johnson's veto of the bill amending the Judiciary Act of 1789.

=== April 1868 ===
- April 24 – The United States Coast Survey produces a report that supports acquiring Greenland and Iceland as American territory.
- April 27 – The United States signs a treaty with the Cherokee.
- April 29 – The United States signs the Treaty of Fort Laramie with the Sioux and Arapaho.

=== May 1868 ===
- May 7 – The United States signs a treaty with the Crow people.
- May 10 – The United States signs a treaty with the Northern Cheyenne and Northern Arapaho.
- May 16 – The Senate votes on Johnson's impeachment trial. With 35 in favor and 19 opposed, support of removal is one vote fewer than necessary to reach a supermajority. Seven Republicans split with their party to vote against removal.
- May 20 – The 1868 Republican National Convention selects General Ulysses S. Grant as the Republican Party's presidential nominee, with Speaker of the House Schuyler Colfax as his running mate.
- May 26
  - The Senate votes on the second and third charges of Johnson's impeachment trial. These also fail, and the impeachment trial is adjourned with an acquittal.
  - John Stanton gives up his position as secretary of war.
  - The United States signs a treaty of naturalization with the Kingdom of Bavaria.
- May 28 – John Schofield becomes secretary of war, filling the vacancy left by John Stanton.

=== June 1868 ===
- June – Johnson vetoes bills that would grant readmitted states representation in Congress. He says they are redundant to the Constitution, which guarantees Congressional representation to all states. Congress overrides his vetoes.
- June 1 – The United States signs a treaty with the Navajo.

=== July 1868 ===
- July 3 – The United States signs a treaty with the Eastern Band of Shoshoni and Bannock.
- July 4 – The 1868 Democratic National Convention selects former New York governor Horatio Seymour as the Democratic Party's presidential nominee, with General Francis Preston Blair Jr. as his running mate.
- July 9 – The Fourteenth Amendment to the Constitution is ratified.
- July 10 – The United States signs a treaty of naturalization with Mexico.
- July 15 – William M. Evarts becomes attorney general, filling the vacancy left by Henry Stanberry.
- July 19 – The United States signs a treaty of naturalization with the Grand Duchy of Baden.
- July 20 – Johnson vetoes a joint resolution that would invalidate the Electoral College votes of states that seceded, denying them participation in the presidential election. He says that their secession was not recognized by the United States and that they retain all rights of statehood. Congress overrides the veto the same day.
- July 25 – Johnson vetoes a bill about the Freedmen's Bureau because he says it infringes on his power of appointment. Congress overrides the veto the same day.
- July 27 – The United States signs a treaty of naturalization and extradition with Wurttemberg.
- July 28
  - Johnson issues a proclamation certifying the ratification of the Fourteenth Amendment.
  - The United States signs the Burlingame Treaty with China.

=== August 1868 ===
- August 1 – The United States signs a treaty of naturalization with the Grand Duchy of Hesse.
- August 13 – The United States signs a treaty with the Nez Perces.

=== October 1868 ===
- October 10 – Johnson orders General Ulysses S. Grant to oversee the regulation of elections in Southern states.

=== November 1868 ===
- November – The 1868 United States elections take place. Ulysses S. Grant defeats Horatio Seymour in the presidential election. Republican support for suffrage of black Americans increases when their votes bring Grant to a majority.
- November 16 – The United States signs a Bancroft Treaty of naturalization with Belgium.
- November 10 – The 40th United States Congress adjourns from its second session.

=== December 1868 ===
- December 5 – The United States signs a treaty of rights, privileges, and immunities of consular offices with Belgium.
- December 7 – The 40th United States Congress convenes for its third session.
- December 8 – Johnson delivers the 1868 State of the Union Address.
- December 20 – The United States signs a treaty of trademarks with Belgium.
- December 25 – Johnson issues a proclamation pardoning all ex-Confederates for treason.

== 1869 ==
=== January 1869 ===
- January 21 – The United States signs a treaty of extradition and a treaty of rights, privileges, and immunities of consular officers with Italy.

=== February 1869 ===
- February 22 – Johnson vetoes a bill regarding duties on copper imports, saying it advantages "certain mining interests upon Lake Superior" as the expense of the American public.
- February 24 – Congress overrides Johnson's veto of the bill on copper import duties.

=== March 1869 ===
- March 3 – The 40th United States Congress adjourns from its third session.
- March 4 – Johnson's presidency ends and Ulysses S. Grant is inaugurated as the eighteenth president. Johnson does not attend the inauguration of his successor.

== Works cited ==
- Bevans, Charles I. (1968). Treaties and Other International Agreements of the United States of America, 1776-1949. United States Department of State.
- Hall, Kermit L.; Ely, James W., eds. (2009). The Oxford Guide to United States Supreme Court Decisions (2nd ed.). Oxford University Press.
