= Garner v. Board of Public Works =

- Supreme Court of the United States

Argued April 25, 1951 Decided June 4, 1951
- Full case name: Garner, et al. v. Board of Public Works of Los Angeles, et al.
- Citations: 341 U.S. 716 (more) 71 S. Ct. 909; 95 L. Ed. 1317; 1951 U.S. LEXIS 1731

Case history
- Prior: From the District Court of Appeal of California, Second Appellate District

Holding
- A municipal loyalty oath which required an oath and affidavit about one's beliefs and actions for the previous five years and which was enacted more than five years previous is not an ex post facto law nor a bill of attainder

Court membership
- Chief Justice Fred M. Vinson Associate Justices Hugo Black · Stanley F. Reed; Felix Frankfurter · William O. Douglas; Robert H. Jackson · Harold H. Burton; Tom C. Clark · Sherman Minton

Case opinions
- Majority: Clark, joined by Vinson, Reed, Jackson, Minton
- Concur/dissent: Frankfurter
- Concur/dissent: Burton
- Dissent: Black
- Dissent: Douglas, joined by Black

Garner v. Board of Public Works, 341 U.S. 716 (1951), is a ruling by the United States Supreme Court which held that a municipal loyalty oath which required an oath and affidavit about one's beliefs and actions for the previous five years and which was enacted more than five years previous is not an ex post facto law nor a bill of attainder.

== Background ==
In 1941, the California State Legislature amended the charter of the city of Los Angeles so that no person could obtain or retain public employment with the city if they advocated the violent overthrow of either the state or federal government, belonged to any organization that did so advocate, or had advocated or been a member of an organization which advocated such action in the last five years. In 1948, the city of Los Angeles passed local ordinance No, 94,004, which required all employees to take the loyalty oath.

Fifteen employees with the Los Angeles Board of Public Works refused to execute the required affidavit. At an administrative hearing on January 6, 1949, all 15 individuals were fired. They sued for back pay and reinstatement in their jobs, claiming that the oath and the affidavit they were required to execute constituted a bill of attainder and an ex post facto law. The District Court of Appeals denied relief.

The petitioners then appealed to the U.S. Supreme Court, which granted certiorari.

== Decision ==
=== Majority opinion ===
Associate Justice Tom C. Clark wrote the opinion for the majority.

Clark discussed the oath and the affidavit separately. In three sentences, Clark held that since past actions and beliefs may impugn present fitness for duty, the affidavit was justified. The question for the oath (which reached back five years into the past) was its constitutionality, and here Clark relied heavily on United Public Workers v. Mitchell, 330 U.S. 75 (1947), to answer that the oath was valid. Since the charter change had occurred seven years before, and the oath reached back only five years, the oath was also not a bill of attainder or ex post facto law. Clark distinguished United States v. Lovett, 328 U.S. 303 (1946), which was not a general law establishing qualifications for office but which specifically named certain individuals and required their separation from government service.

Petitioners had argued that the charter amendment required scienter (knowledge that the organizations they belonged to did, in fact, advocate the violent overthrow of the government or a communist political philosophy). Clark assumed that the city would not implement the law in such a way as to punish those individuals who lacked scienter, and assumed that scienter was implicit in the ordinance.

The decision of the District Court of Appeals was affirmed.

=== Frankfurter's dissent ===
Associate Justice Felix Frankfurter concurred in part and dissented in part.

Frankfurter noted in his dissent that the majority had repeatedly referred to public employment as a privilege, which to his mind invoked the "doctrine of privilege." Invoking this doctrine, he concluded "does not meet the problem."

But Frankfurter was unable to agree that the Los Angeles ordinance implied scienter. He wrote: "To find scienter implied in a criminal statute is the obvious way of reading such a statute, for guilty knowledge is the normal ingredient of criminal responsibility. The ordinance before us exacts an oath as a condition of employment; it does not define a crime. It is certainly not open to this Court to rewrite the oath required by Los Angeles of its employees..." The lack of an explicit requirement for scienter in the law, he concluded, asked the employees "to swear to something they cannot be expected to know. Such a demand ... can no more be justified than the inquiry into belief which [was] invalid in American Communications Association v. Douds, 339 U.S. 382 (1950)."

Frankfurter would have remanded the case back to the state court with instructions that the petitioners be allowed to take the oath under the scienter requirement imposed by the Court.

=== Burton's dissent ===
Associate Justice Harold Hitz Burton dissented in part. Under the Court's decisions in United States v. Lovett, Ex parte Garland, 71 U.S. 333 (1867), and Cummings v. Missouri, 71 U.S. 277 (1867), Burton concluded, the oath as currently framed was an ex post facto law and a bill of attainder. However, Burton would have affirmed the lower court concerning the judgment regarding the two employees who had refused to sign the affidavit. The affidavit merely represented an assertion of true facts, Burton said, and as such could be required of the employees.

=== Douglas' dissent ===
Associate Justice William O. Douglas dissented, joined by Associate Justice Hugo Black.

Douglas concluded that the entire case was governed by the decisions in Ex parte Garland and Cummings v. Missouri. A bill of attainder as defined in these cases inflicts punishment without a judicial trial, and may be inflicted against an individual or a class (contrary to the majority's conclusion that it applies only to an individual). That Garland and Cummings involved professionals rather than laborers and that Garland and Cummings involved vague accusations of misconduct rather than the single specific accusation in Garner was irrelevant, Douglas said. Since the Los Angeles ordinance permitted no hearing, it was a bill of attainder and not constitutionally valid.

Douglas did not reach the issue of whether the ordinance was an ex post facto law.

=== Black's dissent ===
Justice Black further dissented from the majority by making two additional points. First, he argued that the majority mischaracterized the decision in Gerende v. Board of Supervisors. The Maryland law in Gerende was limited to actual acts of violence or overthrow, while the Los Angeles ordinance was not. Second, Black believed that the majority's decision in Garner significantly weakened the Court's holdings in Ex parte Garland, Cummings v. Missouri, and United States v. Lovett.

== See also ==
- List of United States Supreme Court cases involving the First Amendment
- List of United States Supreme Court cases, volume 341

== Bibliography ==
- Rosenbloom, David and O'Leary, Rosemary. Public Administration and Law. 2d ed. Washington, D.C.: CRC Press, 1996.
