= American Communications Ass'n v. Douds =

American Communications Association v. Douds
- Supreme Court of the United States

Argued October 10–11, 1949 Decided May 8, 1950
- Full case name: American Communications Association, C. I. O., et al. v. Charles T. Douds, Regional Director of the National Labor Relations Board
- Citations: 339 U.S. 382 (more) 70 S. Ct. 674; 94 L. Ed. 925; 1950 U.S. LEXIS 2530; 18 Lab. Cas. (CCH) ¶ 65,760; 26 L.R.R.M. 2084

Case history
- Prior: On appeal from the United States District Court for the Southern District of New York, 79 F.Supp. 563 (1948)

Holding
- Taft–Hartley Act's anti-communist oath does not violate the First Amendment, Article I, Section 10 of the United States Constitution, or Article VI of the Constitution.

Court membership
- Chief Justice Fred M. Vinson Associate Justices Hugo Black · Stanley F. Reed; Felix Frankfurter · William O. Douglas; Robert H. Jackson · Harold H. Burton; Tom C. Clark · Sherman Minton

Case opinions
- Majority: Vinson, joined by Reed, Burton; Frankfurter (except as to Part VII)
- Concurrence: Frankfurter
- Concur/dissent: Jackson
- Dissent: Black
- Douglas, Clark, and Minton took no part in the consideration or decision of the case.

Laws applied
- National Labor Relations Act; Taft-Hartley Act; U.S. Const. Art. I, Art. VI, amend. I

American Communications Association v. Douds, 339 U.S. 382 (1950), is a 5-to-1 ruling by the United States Supreme Court which held that the Taft–Hartley Act's imposition of an anti-communist oath on labor union leaders does not violate the First Amendment to the United States Constitution, is not an ex post facto law or bill of attainder in violation of Article One, Section 10 of the United States Constitution, and is not a "test oath" in violation of Article Six of the Constitution.

== Background ==
The American Communications Association (ACA) was founded in 1931 as the American Radio Telegraphists Association (ARTA) by Mervyn Rathbone. The union represented telegraphists and radio operators (on land and at sea) in the United States. The union had previously been involved in a Supreme Court case regarding the use of strikebreakers in strikes (NLRB v. Mackay Radio & Telegraph Co., 304 U.S. 333 (1938)), which it had lost. In 1937, the union changed its name to the American Communications Association and affiliated with the newly formed Congress of Industrial Organizations. A majority of the union's members were strongly left-wing, and most of the union's leaders were members of the Communist Party USA (CPUSA)—with the union effectively under the control of the CPUSA.

The United States Congress enacted the National Labor Relations Act (NLRA) on June 27, 1935, and President Franklin D. Roosevelt signed it into law on July 5. In 1947, Congress amended the NLRA by enacting the Labor–Management Relations Act (better known as the Taft-Hartley Act) on June 23, 1947, overriding President Harry S. Truman's veto. Section 9(h) of the Taft-Hartley Act required leaders of labor unions to file an affidavit with the National Labor Relations Board affirming that they were not members of the Communist Party USA and did not advocate the violent overthrow of the United States federal government. If a union had an elected leader who did not file such an affidavit, that union would lose the protection of the NLRA.

ACA leaders categorically refused to sign the anti-communist affidavits on the grounds that the oaths violated their First Amendment rights. On October 29, 1947, Charles T. Douds, regional director of the National Labor Relations Board in New York City, barred the American Communications Association from appearing on an NLRB-supervised union organizing election (its very first action under the new Taft-Hartley anti-communist oath provisions). The ACA sued to have the provision declared unconstitutional as a violation of its leaders' First Amendment rights.

== Procedural history ==
On June 29, 1948, the United States Court of Appeals for the Second Circuit held, in a 2-to-1 decision written by Judge Thomas Walter Swan, that Section 9(h) did not impermissibly impose on union members' First Amendment rights. Attorney Victor Rabinowitz appealed the case to the Supreme Court. The U.S. Supreme Court granted certiorari on November 8, 1949. Although the Court was due to hear oral argument on January 13, 1949, it delayed this in order to take on another case (United Steelworkers of America v. National Labor Relations Board) with almost identical issues. Argument was rescheduled for February 28, 1949, but did not occur until October 11 so that both cases could be heard together.

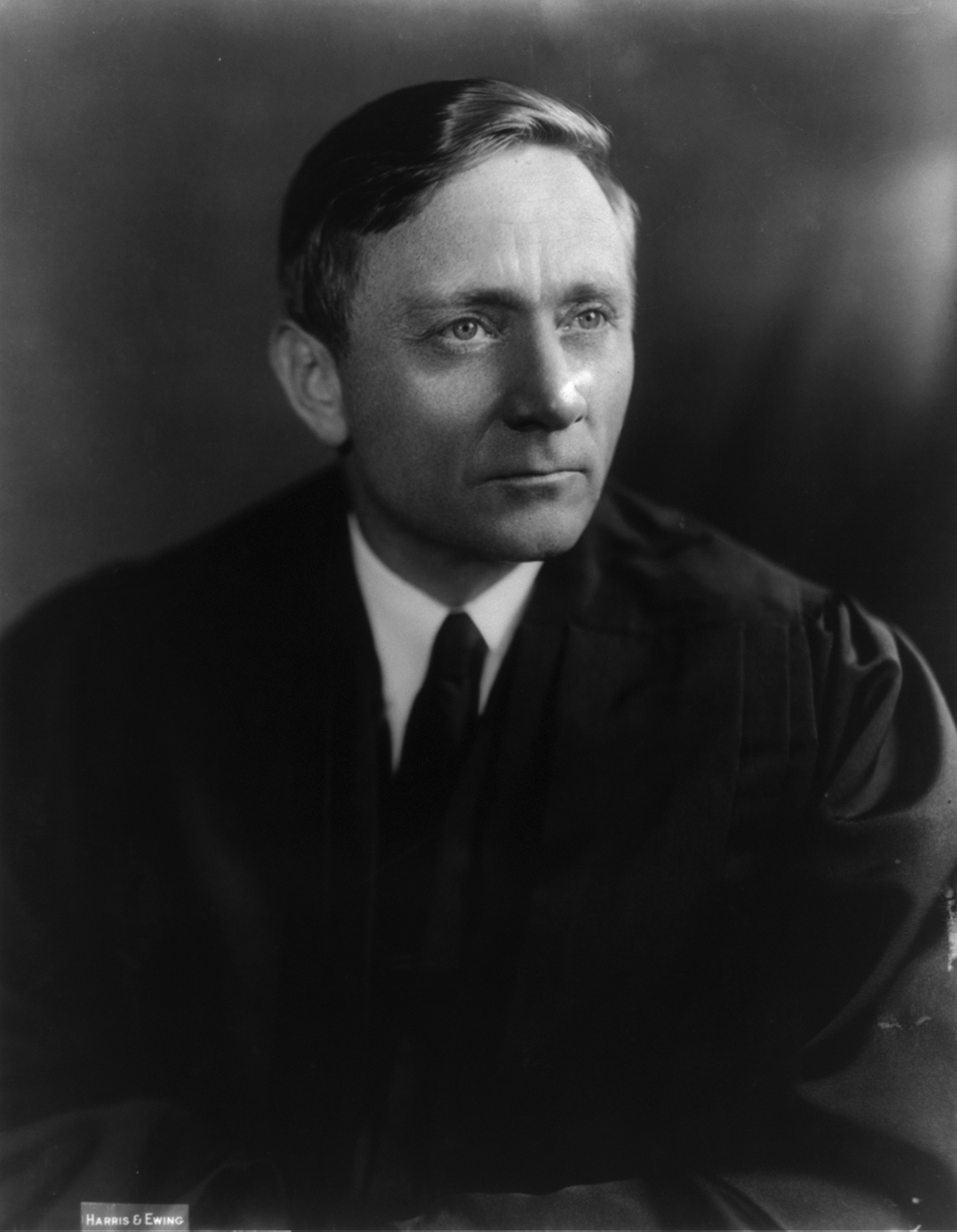
Justice Douglas did not participate in the case after being severely injured in a horse-riding accident.

Three of the Court's most liberal justices did not participate in the decision. Justice William O. Douglas did not participate because he had nearly been killed in a horseback-riding accident earlier in the year, and was still convalescing at his home in Arizona. Associate Justice Tom Clark had been President Truman's Attorney General, and had overseen the prosecution of the ACA. Although he joined the Court on August 24, 1949, Clark had recused himself due to his prior involvement in the case. Associate Justice Wiley Blount Rutledge, a staunch liberal and strong advocate for civil rights, had died unexpectedly of a stroke on September 10, 1949, at the age of 55. His successor, 59-year-old Sherman Minton, a former Democratic Senator from Indiana and a judge on the United States Court of Appeals for the Seventh Circuit, was nominated as his replacement on September 16, 1949, but was not sworn in until October 12. His arrival on the Court came two days after oral argument, and he was not able to participate in the decision.

== Decision ==
=== Majority ruling ===
Chief Justice Fred M. Vinson wrote the plurality decision for the majority, joined by Associate Justices Stanley Forman Reed and Harold Hitz Burton. Associate Justice Felix Frankfurter joined in all but Part VII of the majority opinion.

In Part I of the decision, Vinson first reviewed the relevant language in the Taft-Hartley Act, as well as that language which provided for processing of affidavits and imposition of penalties in the event no affidavits were filed in the time permitted. He also reviewed the justification for upholding the constitutionality of the NLRA, which was to remove obstructions to interstate commerce. He also reviewed Congress' justification for passing the Taft-Hartley Act, which also attempted to remove impediments to interstate commerce—including the so-called "political strike," in which "legitimate trade union objectives" were subordinated by the Communist Party to political objectives.

In Part II, Vinson posed what a plurality of the court believed was the key question:

We are, therefore, neither free to treat § 9(h) as if it merely withdraws a privilege gratuitously granted by the Government, nor able to consider it a licensing statute prohibiting those persons who do not sign the affidavit from holding union office. The practicalities of the situation place the proscriptions of § 9(h) somewhere between those two extremes. The difficult question that emerges is whether, consistently with the First Amendment, Congress, by statute, may exert these pressures upon labor unions to deny positions of leadership to certain persons who are identified by particular beliefs and political affiliations.

Part III of the decision addressed Congress' power to prevent political strikes through the Commerce Clause, whether the remedy designed was reasonable, and whether the threat posed by the Communist Party was so unique in its use of political strikes and in advocacy of violence that Congress could single it out. Vinson answered all questions affirmatively. Citing In re Summers, 325 U.S. 561 (1945); Clarke v. Deckebach, 274 U.S. 392 (1927); and Hirabayashi v. United States, 320 U.S. 81 (1943), among others, Vinson noted that the Constitution often permitted otherwise irrelevant beliefs, personal traits, or employment status to be infringed upon in certain, limited circumstances.

The question addressed in Part IV of the decision was whether the Communist Party presented such circumstances. The unions had argued that a "clear and present danger" test be applied to the legislation, as this was a First Amendment issue, but could not agree on how to do so. Vinson rejected the attempt to apply the "clear and present danger" standard as a mechanical test:

This confusion suggests that the attempt to apply the term, "clear and present danger," as a mechanical test in every case touching First Amendment freedoms, without regard to the context of its application, mistakes the form in which an idea was cast for the substance of the idea. The provisions of the Constitution, said Mr. Justice Holmes, "are not mathematical formulas having their essence in their form; they are organic living institutions transplanted from English soil. Their significance is vital not formal; it is to be gathered not simply by taking the words and a dictionary, but by considering their origin and the line of their growth."

One of the unions had argued that political strikes did not constitute such an imminent danger as to pass constitutional scrutiny, but Vinson rejected this once more as a mechanical application of an inapt test. Congress had not concluded, in enacting the Taft-Hartley Act, that expressing communist beliefs was a danger; rather, Congress had wished to eliminate impediments to interstate commerce. The problem with political strikes, Vinson asserted, was that rather than allowing speech to combat speech in the "marketplace of ideas", strikes constitute force and coercion which Congress has every authority to regulate.

Rather, Vinson argued, the Court has permitted conduct-based restrictions of constitutionally protected First Amendment rights when a sound truck invades the privacy of the home (Kovacs v. Cooper, 336 U.S. 77 (1949)), unauthorized parades disrupt traffic (Cox v. New Hampshire, 312 U.S. 569, (1941)), the health of children is at stake (Prince v. Massachusetts, 321 U.S. 158 (1944)), or the provision of public services is affected (United Public Workers v. Mitchell, 330 U.S. 75 (1947)). Advocating a balancing of interests and citing Reynolds v. United States, 98 U. S. 145 (1878) (an individual's religious beliefs cannot be accepted as proof of a felony act without evidence of commission of the crime), Vinson instead proposed a balancing test.

Part V of the decision discussed whether political strikes posed such a significant issue as to permissibly infringe on freedom of speech. Vinson refused to substitute the Court's judgment for the congressional determination that this was the case. In accepting the authority of government to promote strong unions, Vinson observed, the Court had repeatedly also accepted the authority of government to infringe in sometimes substantial ways upon individual liberties. The Taft-Hartley Act's penalties, Vinson held, were not direct infringements on the freedom to speak and thus not as onerous as infringements the Court had approved in the past. Vinson rejected the suggestion that the statute had not been narrowly drawn. Although legislation could have been enacted which made political strikes themselves unlawful (rather than require anti-communist affidavits), Vinson asserted that:

...the legislative judgment that interstate commerce must be protected from a continuing threat of such strikes is a permissible one in this case. The fact that the injury to interstate commerce would be an accomplished fact before any sanctions could be applied, the possibility that a large number of such strikes might be called at a time of external or internal crisis, and the practical difficulties which would be encountered in detecting illegal activities of this kind are factors which are persuasive that Congress should not be powerless to remove the threat, not limited to punishing the act.

Part VI of the decision discussed whether the statute impermissibly targeted the Communist Party as the sole political party seeking the violent overthrow of the United States government. If the statute had penalized anyone who advocated violent overthrow of the government, Vinson held, there would be new constitutional doubts raised. But it was the Court's long-held tenet that statutes should be construed constitutionally wherever possible. Subsequently, Vinson interpreted Section 9(h) narrowly as barring from union office those who actually advocated overthrow of the government and not those who (for example) believed it would happen without their assistance. Vinson reiterated that the balancing of interests in Part V had found the infringement on free speech permissible. But how did this reconcile with Reynolds v. United States? Because, Vinson said, "Insofar as a distinction between beliefs and political affiliations is based upon absence of any 'overt act' ... the act of joining the Party is crucial. ... courts and juries every day pass upon knowledge, belief and intent—the state of men's minds—having before them no more than evidence of their words and conduct, from which, in ordinary human experience, mental condition may be inferred."

In Part VII, Vinson address whether Section 9(h) was unconstitutionally vague and/or was a bill of attainder or ex post facto law. Vinson admitted that, hypothetically, the language of the Act might be construed as vague. But in accordance with the Court's long-held rule, he construed the Act narrowly and asserted that there was no vagueness. Although the unions had held the Act was a bill of attainder under United States v. Lovett, 328 U.S. 303 (1946); Ex parte Garland, 71 U.S. 333 (1867); and Cummings v. Missouri, 71 U.S. 277 (1867), Vinson observed that these cases punished past actions whereas Section 9(h) punished only future conduct. Nor did the Act run afoul of Article VI of the Constitution: "...the mere fact that § 9(h) is in oath form hardly rises to the stature of a constitutional objection. All that was forbidden was a 'religious Test.' We do not think that the oath here involved can rightly be taken as falling within that category."

The judgment of the district court was affirmed.

=== Concurrence ===
Associate Justice Felix Frankfurter concurred with the majority opinion except as to Part VII.

Frankfurter argued that constitutional questions should be decided as narrowly as possible. He asserted that "it would make undue inroads upon the policymaking power of Congress" to deny the government the right to prevent political strikes and disruptions to interstate commerce so long as it does not do so in an arbitrary way or infringes on unrelated rights.

However, despite his agreement with nearly all of the majority's reasoning in Parts I-VI, Frankfurter held that portions of Section 9(h) over impermissibly overbroad. Section 9(h) "ask[s] assurances from men regarding matters that open the door too wide to mere speculation or uncertainty. It is asking more than rightfully may be asked of ordinary men to take oath that a method is not 'unconstitutional' or 'illegal' when constitutionality or legality is frequently determined by this Court by the chance of a single vote." The safeguards of the judicial system, Frankfurter asserted, were "too tenuous to neutralize the danger" to First Amendment freedoms.

Section 9(h) simply goes too far, he said, in demanding that an oath taken today—even if well-considered, sincere, and seriously undertaken—is predictive of all future behavior and belief.

I cannot deem it within the rightful authority of Congress to probe into opinions that involve only an argumentative demonstration of some coincidental parallelism of belief with some of the beliefs of those who direct the policy of the Communist Party, though without any allegiance to it. To require oaths as to matters that open up such possibilities invades the inner life of men...

Frankfurter acknowledged, however, that only these parts of Section 9(h) were invalid, and he would have remanded the case back to the district court with instructions for the union officers to obey only those constitutionally sound provisions.

=== Concurrence/Dissent ===
Associate Justice Robert H. Jackson concurred in part and dissented in part.

Jackson held that the critical distinction was the nature of the Communist Party: "If the statute before us required labor union officers to forswear membership in the Republican Party, the Democratic Party or the Socialist Party, I suppose all agree that it would be unconstitutional. But why, if it is valid as to the Communist Party?" But "the Communist Party is something different, in fact, from any other substantial party we have known, and hence may constitutionally be treated as something different in law." Jackson reviewed at length the reasons why the Communist Party was unique: It constituted a minority which advocated the seizing of power through non-majoritarian means, it was a political party controlled by a foreign government, it was dedicated to violence as the means of seizing power (including "occasional terroristic and threatening methods, such as picketing courts and juries, political strikes and sabotage"), it sought to achieve its violent ends by controlling the labor movement (control it must conceal in order to be effective), and it considers all its members "agents" of the party (unlike loosely-knit "native" parties).

Jackson equated the power of Congress to protect a union from domination by the Communist Party equal to the power Congress had to prevent a union from being dominated by an employer. The Taft-Hartley Act did not prevent unions from governing themselves or union members from electing Communists as its officers, but rather ensured transparency in governance and elections (thereby ensuring self-governance as well).

Jackson agreed with the majority that the Act did not infringe free speech, but rather merely withdrew the protection of the NLRA from unions which exercised their transparent choice to elect Communists as leaders. Jackson saw the chilling effect on free speech to be incidental:

I suppose no one likes to be compelled to exonerate himself from connections he has never acquired. I have sometimes wondered why I must file papers showing I did not steal my car before I can get a license for it. But experience shows there are thieves among automobile drivers, and that there are Communists among labor leaders. The public welfare, in identifying both, outweighs any affront to individual dignity.

However, did Congress have the "power to proscribe any opinion or belief which has not manifested itself in any overt act"? That raised much more serious constitutional questions, Jackson said. He agreed that "The law sometimes does inquire as to mental state, but only, so far as I recall, when it is incidental to, and determines the quality of, some overt act in question." Citing Cramer v. United States, 325 U.S. 1 (1945), Jackson observed that the Constitution barred punishment even of the very serious crime of treason unless there was some overt act. But under the majority's decision, Jackson said, "since Congress has never outlawed the political strike itself, the Court must be holding that Congress may root out mere ideas which, even if acted upon, would not result in crime." That was anathema to the Constitution. Agreeing that the Bill of Rights was not a suicide pact (as the majority had pointed out), Jackson nonetheless concluded that Congress had narrower, just as effective means of preventing the violent overthrow of the government than attempting to regulate thought. "I think that, under our system, it is time enough for the law to lay hold of the citizen when he acts illegally, or in some rare circumstances when his thoughts are given illegal utterance. I think we must let his mind alone."

Jackson would have upheld the power of Congress to require disclosure of past acts or membership in the Communist Party, but overturned any parts of the Act that called for a disclosure of belief.

=== Dissent ===
Associate Justice Hugo Black dissented.

The First Amendment does not allow the government to regulate beliefs, Black asserted, and yet the majority admitted that this is exactly what Section 9(h) does. Despite the majority's lengthy citation of cases, Black said, "No case cited by the Court provides the least vestige of support for thus holding that the Commerce Clause restricts the right to think."

Black found that Section 9(h) did indeed impose a "test oath" on union leaders, and the Constitution explicitly barred such oaths. He rejected the majority's claim that the First Amendment was not offended since only a small number of people were affected. The very nature of "the First Amendment is its protection of each member of the smallest and most unorthodox minority."

Furthermore, Black said, the majority's decision does not prevent the government from "barring Communists and their suspected sympathizers from election to political office, mere membership in unions, and, in fact, from getting or holding any jobs whereby they could earn a living." He also found offensive the majority's belief that the Supreme Court exists to protect individual liberty. That claim "springs from the assumption that individual mental freedom can be constitutionally abridged whenever any majority of this Court finds a satisfactory legislative reason. Never before has this Court held that the Government could for any reason attaint persons for their political beliefs or affiliations. It does so today." That Congress had concluded from testimony that the Communist Party was a threat to national security was irrelevant, he said, for Democrats could testify the same thing about Republicans and thus ban Republicans from union office just as effectively. Such reasoning was offensive to the idea of constitutionally protected liberties, Black said:

Under today's opinion, Congress could validly bar all members of these parties from officership in unions or industrial corporations; the only showing required would be testimony that some members in such positions had, by attempts to further their party's purposes, unjustifiably fostered industrial strife which hampered interstate commerce.

Nor was Justice Jackson's claim that the Communist Party was foreign-controlled a valid reason for imposing test oaths. Test oaths were imposed in 16th century England because Protestant rulers feared papal control of their Roman Catholic subjects, Black noted. Even Thomas Jefferson was once accused of having more loyalty to France than the United States. The Constitution expressly barred test oaths because of injustices such as these, Black said.

Black also held that "Guilt should not be imputed solely from association or affiliation with political parties or any other organization, however much we abhor the ideas which they advocate." Addressing the majority's "suicide pact" idea, Black asserted that the First Amendment's tolerance of anti-democratic ideas was what protected the nation from disaster: "...the postulate of the First Amendment is that our free institutions can be maintained without proscribing or penalizing political belief, speech, press, assembly, or party affiliation. This is a far bolder philosophy than despotic rulers can afford to follow. It is the heart of the system on which our freedom depends." Citing De Jonge v. Oregon, 299 U.S. 353 (1937), Black noted that a unanimous Court had already struck down laws which banned citizens from attending Communist Party meetings. It should strike down the relevant portions of the Taft-Hartley Act as well, he concluded.

== Assessment ==
The penalties imposed on the ACA by Section 9(h) crippled the union. In May 1949, the Congress of Industrial Organizations ordered its member unions to have their leaders sign the anti-communist oaths or risk expulsion. At its annual convention in early November 1949, the CIO found the ACA "guilty" of not filing the required oaths and ordered it expelled. Expulsion occurred in June 1950. But lacking the protection of the NLRA and constantly fending off raids from affiliates of the CIO and the American Federation of Labor (affiliates whose leaders were eager to sign the oath), the ACA shrank rapidly. Several of its divisions (including the old ARTA department) had disaffiliated and the union shrank to fewer than 2,000 members. It merged with the Teamsters in 1966.

American Communications Association v. Douds was the first important test of loyalty oaths in the U.S. Supreme Court. A year later, the Court relied heavily on Douds' oath-as-predictor-of-future-action rationale in upholding a local government loyalty test in Garner v. Board of Public Works, 341 U.S. 716 (1951). The divided court in Douds anticipated the difficulty the Supreme Court would have in the coming years, during which time it usually upheld loyalty oaths but found no clear test or rule for doing so. The case was also the first time the Court applied a balancing test to indirect restrictions on free speech, a test the Court would consistently apply in many similar cases in the future. But the balancing test itself has been criticized as offering little guidance to future courts, not enough protection to First Amendment rights, and too much deference to the legislature.

The reasoning by the majority in American Communications Association v. Douds has not been well-received by legal scholars. One historian characterized the decision as combining "guilt by association" with the discredited "bad tendency test". One legal scholar has called Vinson's heavy reliance on the Commerce Clause as "implausible". Douds also seems to have got some facts wrong: The political strikes Vinson relied on for examples in the case were not Communist-led but rather routine labor conflicts. The majority (unwittingly or not) believed in a distinctly American myth about a monolithic Communist Party controlled from overseas, endowed with the ability to deceive American workers, and capable of bringing the nation to its knees through the use of political strikes. Vinson's balancing test had a decidedly pro-government bias, and the decision appeared to undermine a decade's worth of First Amendment decisions. Vinson's claim that the Taft-Hartley Act did not proscribe belief has been called "sophistry." And the majority's claim that any flaws in its approach can be easily rectified by appealing to the Supreme Court was not only scoffed at by Justice Black but has also been sharply criticized by legal scholars. (To be fair, some legal scholars disagree, and believe the Court has done an excellent job of protecting First Amendment rights.)

Douds has also been criticized for undermining the First Amendment right to freedom of association. This right was also enshrined in the First Amendment. In 1945, the Court had declared in Thomas v. Collins, 323 U.S. 516 (1945) that freedom of association held a "preferred place" in the pantheon of constitutional values. Three years later, in United States v. Congress of Industrial Organizations, 335 U.S. 106 (1948) Justice Rutledge had concluded that, when confronted with the freedom of association, "[Legislative] judgment does not bear the same weight and is not entitled to the same presumption of validity, when the legislation on its face or in specific application restricts the rights of conscience, expression and assembly protected by the Amendment..." Yet, in Douds, the Court announced it was going to show great deference to legislative determinations regarding the danger communists posed.

Nonetheless, American Communications Association v. Douds should not be seen as an anomalous decision in the Supreme Court's First Amendment jurisprudence. One noted legal historian has observed that it is but one of many "bad tendency test" cases in a series of decisions between 1919 and 1956.

American Communications Association v. Douds is also important because it is part of the Court's evolving jurisprudence on bills of attainder. It stands firmly in the Court's bill of attainder jurisprudence established by Justice Frankfurter in his dissent in United States v. Lovett, 328 U.S. 303 (1946), thereafter adopted by a majority of the Court. Frankfurter and a majority of the Court believed that the framers of the Constitution were not concerned as much with unfairness as they were with specification of the offense, the legislative (rather than judicial) determination of guilt, and retribution for past acts. Douds stands firmly in this analysis, which found favor with the Court until 1965. It is no surprise, then, that the Supreme Court refused to declare Section 9(h) a bill of attainder, because it prohibited future rather than past acts. The ability to "escape" the penalty (e.g., renounce membership in the Communist Party and take the oath) also negated any conclusion that Section 9(h) was a bill of attainder. In 1965, however, the Supreme Court held, 5-to-4, that Section 504 of the Taft-Hartley Act was a bill of attainder in United States v. Brown, 381 U.S. 437 (1965). Section 504 made it an actual crime for any person who was or had been a member of the Communist Party to serve as an officer in a labor union. The Court overturned Section 504 because past behavior was being punished. But the Court went further, and said that singling out members of the Communist Party for punishment also invalidated Section 504 as a bill of attainder. How could the Court reconcile this with its analysis in Douds, where it had not held such specificity to invalidate the law? The Brown Court said that general legislation which required regulatory rulemaking did not specify individuals well enough to make the law a bill of attainder. That regulatory action was needed under Section 9(h) but not under Section 504 saved Section 9(h). The Court implied that its Equal Protection analysis would be applied in cases where punishment was meted out under regulatory procedures, and that due process and equal protection would guarantee rights in these situations. Douds was difficult to reconcile with Brown in another way, too. Douds had focused heavily on the fact that the Taft-Hartley Act's restrictions were intended to prevent future, not past, actions. This was critical to saving Section 9(h). But in Brown, the Court held that "Punishment serves several purposes; retributive, rehabilitative, deterrent—and preventive", establishing that a law can be a bill of attainder even it is preventive.

It is not clear whether Douds remains good case law. The Supreme Court distinguished the case but declined to overrule Douds in Dennis v. United States, 341 U.S. 494 (1951). In 1965, in United States v. Brown, 381 U.S. 437 (1965), the Supreme Court essentially overturned Douds by holding that the Taft-Hartley Act's oath constituted a bill of attainder, but did not formally do so. Two years later, in United States v. Robel, 389 U.S. 258 (1967), the Court specifically declined to apply a balancing test to a law prohibiting members of the Communist Party from holding jobs in the defense industry. Although the law was based on the same rationale as Taft-Hartley (that membership in the Communist Party was a sure indication of future action), the Supreme Court said this was too heavy an infringement on the individual's First Amendment rights. Instead, the Court seemed to suggest a new, two-part test: Whether the governmental interests advanced are valid, and whether the statute is narrowly drawn to infringe on First Amendment rights in the most narrow way. The Court returned to the balancing test in Brandenberg v. Ohio, 395 U.S. 444 (1969), but this time concluded that prohibiting mere advocacy of violence was too heavy a burden on the First Amendment. Such advocacy must produce imminent action for the speech to be punishable, the Court held.

== See also ==
- List of United States Supreme Court cases involving the First Amendment
- List of United States Supreme Court cases, volume 339

== Bibliography ==
- Abernathy, M. Glenn and Perry, Barbara A. Civil Liberties Under the Constitution. Columbia, S.C.: University of South Carolina Press, 1993.
- Auerbach, Carl A. "The Communist Control Act of 1954: a Proposed Legal-Political Theory of Free Speech." University of Chicago Law Review. 23:173 (1956).
- Becker, Jerrold L. "The Supreme Court's Recent 'National Security' Decisions: Which Interests are Being Protected?" Tennessee Law Review. 40:1 (Fall 1972).
- "Beyond Process: A Substantive Rationale for the Bill of Attainder Clause." Virginia Law Review. 70:475 (April 1984).
- Bork, Robert H. "Neutral Principles and Some First Amendment Problems." Indiana Law Journal. 47:1 (1971).
- "Both Houses Clear Wagner Labor Bill." New York Times. June 28, 1935.
- Busky, Donald F. Communism in History and Theory: Asia, Africa, and the Americas. Westport, Conn.: Praeger, 2002.
- Carringan, Alison C. "The Bill of Attainder Clause: A New Weapon to Challenge the Oil Pollution Act of 1990." Boston College Environmental Affairs Law Review. 28:119 (2000).
- Cohen, Barbara Ellen. "The Scope of First Amendment Protection for Political Boycotts: Means and Ends in First Amendment Analysis: NAACP v. Claiborne Hardware Co." Wisconsin Law Review. 1984:1273 (July/August 1984).
- Christopher, Warren. Chances of a Lifetime: A Memoir. New York: Scribner, 2001.
- Douglas, William O. The Court Years, 1939-1975: The Autobiography of William O. Douglas. New York: Vintage Books, 1981.
- Downey, Greg. "Telegraph Messenger Strikes and Their Impact on Telegraph Unionization." In The Encyclopedia of Strikes in American History. Aaron Brenner, Benjamin Day, and Immanuel Ness, eds. Armonk, N.Y.: M. E. Sharpe, 2009.
- Eisler, Kim Isaac. The Last Liberal: Justice William J. Brennan, Jr., and the Decisions That Transformed America. Washington, D.C.: Beard Books, 1993.
- Emerson, Thomas Irwin. The System of Freedom of Expression. New York: Random House, 1970.
- Emerson, Thomas I.; Haber, David; and Dorsen, Norman. Political and Civil Rights in the United States. 3d ed. Boston: Little, Brown, 1967.
- Estey, Marten. The Unions: Structure, Development, and Management. New York: Houghton Mifflin Harcourt, 1981.
- "Final Court Test on Taft Bill Seen." New York Times. June 30, 1948.
- Frankel, Benjamin. History in Dispute: The Red Scare After 1945. Detroit: St. James Press, 2000.
- "High Court Will Rule on Two Cases Involving Taft Act Oath and Eisler." New York Times. November 9, 1948.
- Inazu, John D. "The Strange Origins of the Constitutional Right of Association." Tennessee Law Review. 77:485 (Spring 2010).
- "Justice Wiley Rutledge Dies of Brain Hemorrhage at 55." New York Times. September 11, 1949.
- Kearney, Kevin M. "Private Citizens in Foreign Affairs: A Constitutional Analysis." Emory Law Journal. 36:285 (Winter 1987).
- Loftus, Joseph A. "CIO Tells Leftists to Obey or Resign." New York Times. May 20, 1949.
- Loftus, Joseph A. "High Court Delays Red Clause Ruling." New York Times. January 14, 1949.
- Lowitt, Richard. Interpreting Twentieth-Century America: A Reader. New York: Crowell, 1973.
- May-Stewart, Estelle. Handbook of American Trade-Unions: 1936 Edition. Washington, D.C.: Bureau of Labor Statistics, 1936.
- "Minton Is Confirmed For Court, 48 to 16." Associated Press. October 5, 1949.
- "Minton Sworn In As Supreme Court Justice." New York Times. October 13, 1949.
- Nagel, Robert F. "How Useful Is Judicial Review In Free Speech Cases?" Cornell Law Review. 69:302 (January 1984).
- Newman, Roger K. The Yale Biographical Dictionary of American Law. New Haven, Conn.: Yale University Press, 2009.
- Nimmer, Melville B. "The Right to Speak from Times to Time: First Amendment Theory Applied to Libel and Misapplied to Privacy." California Law Review. 56:935 (1968).
- Rabinowitz, Victor. Unrepentant Leftist: A Lawyer's Memoir. Urbana, Ill.: University of Illinois Press, 1996.
- "Roosevelt Signs the Wagner Bill as 'Just to Labor'." New York Times. July 6, 1935.
- Schiller, Reuel E. "Free Speech and Expertise: Administrative Censorship and the Birth of the Modern First Amendment." Virginia Law Review. 86:1 (February 2000).
- Stark, Louis. "C.I.O. Starts Purge of Leftist Officers." New York Times. November 5, 1949.
- Stark, Louis. "Industry, Labor Sharply Divided." New York Times. June 21, 1947.
- Stark, Louis. "NLRB Blocks Union Bargaining Right." New York Times. October 30, 1947.
- Stark, Louis. "Ouster of Leftists Is Pressed By C.I.O." New York Times. November 6, 1949.
- Stark, Louis. "Some Unions Will Sign Anti-Communist Papers." New York Times. August 31, 1947.
- Starobin, Joseph R. American Communism in Crisis, 1943-1957. Berkeley, Calif.: University of California Press, 1975.
- "Truman Sees Clark Sworn in by Vinson at the White House." New York Times. August 25, 1949.
- "Two More Unions Expelled by C.I.O." New York Times. June 16, 1950.
- Walker, Samuel. In Defense of American Liberties: A History of the ACLU. Carbondale, Ill.: Southern Illinois University Press, 1999.
- Welsh, Jane. "The Bill of Attainder Clause: An Unqualified Guarantee of Process." Brooklyn Law Review. 50:77 (Fall 1983).
- White, William S. "Truman Plea Fails." New York Times. June 24, 1947.
- Wiecek, William M. History of the Supreme Court of the United States: The Birth of the Modern Constitution: The United States Supreme Court, 1941-1953. New York: Macmillan, 2006.
- Wiecek, William M. "The Legal Foundations of Domestic Anticommunism: The Background of Dennis v. United States." Supreme Court Review. 2001:375 (2001).
- Wood, Lewis. "Minton Named to High Court." New York Times. September 16, 1949.
