= In re Summers =

1945 US Supreme Court case on conscientious objection

- Supreme Court of the United States

Argued April 27, 30, 1945 Decided June 11, 1945
- Full case name: In re Clyde Wilson Summers
- Citations: 325 U.S. 561 (more) 65 S. Ct. 1307; 89 L. Ed. 1795

Case history
- Prior: On appeal from the Supreme Court of Illinois

Holding
- Denial of admission to Illinois bar on grounds of conscientious objector status does not violate the First or Fourteenth Amendments to the U.S. Constitution.

Court membership
- Chief Justice Harlan F. Stone Associate Justices Owen Roberts · Hugo Black; Stanley F. Reed · Felix Frankfurter; William O. Douglas · Frank Murphy; Robert H. Jackson · Wiley B. Rutledge

Case opinions
- Majority: Reed, joined by Stone, Roberts, Frankfurter, Jackson
- Dissent: Black, joined by Douglas, Murphy, Rutledge

In re Summers, 325 U.S. 561 (1945), is a 5-to-4 ruling by the United States Supreme Court which held that the First and Fourteenth amendment freedoms of a conscientious objector were not infringed when a state bar association declined to admit him to the practice of law. The Illinois Constitution required (Note: This provision has subsequently been removed.) citizens to serve in the state militia in time of war, and all lawyers admitted to the bar were required to uphold the state constitution. Petitioner Clyde Summers could not uphold that constitutional requirement due to his religious beliefs, and the Supreme Court upheld the denial of his license of practice.

== Background ==
Clyde Summers entered the University of Illinois at Urbana–Champaign at the age of 16, earning a Bachelor of Science in Accounting in 1939 and a Juris Doctor (cum laude) in 1942. While an undergraduate and law student, Summers became active in the Methodist Student Movement and a believer in the social gospel.

The United States entered World War II on December 8, 1941. Summers, opposed to the use of force, declared himself a conscientious objector. In 1942, Summers sought admission to the Illinois State Bar Association, a prerequisite to the practice of law in the state of Illinois. The bar association admitted he was of high moral character and exhibited excellent knowledge of the law, but in January 1943 denied him admission due to his conscientious objector status. Article 12 of the Illinois constitution required citizens to serve in the state militia in time of war, and all lawyers admitted to the bar were required to uphold the state constitution. However, Illinois had not drafted citizens into its state militia since 1864, Article 12 prohibited the drafting of conscientious objectors into the militia during peacetime, and the article permitted conscientious objectors to engage in work of significant national importance during war in lieu of military service. Nonetheless, Summers could not uphold the relevant constitutional requirement due to his religious beliefs, the bar association said.

With representation by the American Civil Liberties Union, Summers sued, alleging that the bar association's actions had infringed his First and Fourteenth amendment rights. The Supreme Court of Illinois held that 1) The courts had no jurisdiction over the issue, and thus no "case or controversy" existed under Article Three of the Constitution; and 2) The bar association had not discriminated against Summers on the basis of his religion but rather on the basis of his ability to uphold the military service section of the Illinois state constitution.

Summers appealed to the U.S. Supreme Court, and which granted certiorari.

== Opinion of the Court ==
=== Majority ===
Associate Justice Stanley Forman Reed wrote the decision for the majority, joined by Chief Justice Stone and Associate Justices Frankfurter, Jackson, and Burton.

Reed first reviewed the case proceedings. Regarding the "case or controversy" aspect of the issue, Reed concluded that the admission of a lawyer to the bar was "a ministerial act which is performed by virtue of the judicial power, such as the appointment of a clerk or bailiff or the specification of the requirements of eligibility or the course of study for applicants for admission to the bar, rather than a judicial proceeding." However, under Osborn v. Bank of the United States, 22 U.S. 738 (1824), because the judicial power is invoked, this allows a case to arise. But was there a controversy? For a controversy to exist, Reed said, it must follow the rule laid down in Muskrat v. United States, 219 U.S. 346 (1911), which held that there must be actual disagreement and merely a hypothetical or potential disagreement. The record in In re Summers was incomplete and the response for petition of certiorari from the Illinois Supreme Court was oddly formed, leaving the issue of a controversy muddied. But the majority concluded that since the bar association committee had formed at the request of the Illinois Supreme Court and that court had acted on Summers' petition for relief, a true controversy existed. Without discussion, Reed furthermore asserted that denial of the right to practice law is a controversy, and a denial of that right by a state court triggers federal jurisdiction under Article Three of the U.S. Constitution.

In addressing Summers' conscientious objector claim, Reed denigrated Summers as a "religionist." Reed next asserted that the Fourteenth Amendment applied only to federal rights, not to purely state-guaranteed rights such as the right to practice law. But were Summers' First Amendment rights implicated? The majority concluded they were not. Reed asserted that the Illinois Supreme Court had not discriminated against Summers on the basis of his religion, but rather on his ability to uphold the Illinois Constitution's requirement that he serve in the militia:

It is said that the action of the Supreme Court of Illinois is contrary to the principles of that portion of the First Amendment which guarantees the free exercise of religion. Of course, under our Constitutional system, men could not be excluded from the practice of law, or indeed from following any other calling, simply because they belong to any of our religious groups, whether Protestant, Catholic, Quaker, or Jewish, assuming it conceivable that any state of the Union would draw such a religious line. We cannot say that any such purpose to discriminate motivated the action of the Illinois Supreme Court.

Reed reviewed Summers' beliefs, noting that he had been certified a conscientious objector by the federal government, his beliefs were religiously founded, and his beliefs were sincerely held. But the Illinois Supreme Court had held that Summers would not serve in the militia if drafted, a claim which Summers had failed to challenge.

But these pacifist religious beliefs were not protected by the First Amendment, Reed said. Relying on Hamilton v. Regents of the University of California, 293 U.S. 245 (1934), he declared conscientious objection a "grace of Congressional recognition" and noted that the state of Illinois recognized no such rights.

The judgment of the Illinois Supreme Court was affirmed.

=== Dissent ===
Associate Justice Hugo Black wrote a dissent, in which he was joined by Associate Justices Douglas, Murphy, and Rutledge.

Black bluntly phrased the issue in terms starkly different than the majority's: "It has denied him a license on the ground that his present religious beliefs disqualify him for membership in the legal profession." Black reviewed Summers' qualifications for the bar, which were exceptionally high and otherwise undisputed. He also reviewed the foundation for Summers' deep religious convictions and opposition to the use of force.

Black found the majority's distinction between upholding the Illinois Constitution and discriminating against Summers' religious beliefs "circuitous". The Illinois Constitution, he said, would discriminate against entire religions, and could lead to the inescapable conclusion that the state could bar a conscientious objector from a wide range of constitutional protections merely by refusing to grant these protections to nonresistors. He wrote:

I cannot believe that a state statute would be consistent with our constitutional guarantee of freedom of religion if it specifically denied the right to practice law to all members of one of our great religious groups, Protestant, Catholic, or Jewish. Yet the Quakers have had a long and honorable part in the growth of our nation, and an amicus curiae brief filed in their behalf informs us that, under the test applied to this petitioner, not one of them, if true to the tenets of their faith, could qualify for the bar in Illinois. And it is obvious that the same disqualification would exist as to every conscientious objector to the use of force, even though the Congress of the United States should continue its practice of absolving them from military service. The conclusion seems to me inescapable that, if Illinois can bar this petitioner from the practice of law it can bar every person from every public occupation solely because he believes in nonresistance, rather than in force.

Black concluded that the Illinois Constitution's requirement was essentially a "test oath," an oath designed to test one's loyalty before any illegal act had actually occurred. But, relying on Cummings v. Missouri, 71 U.S. 277 (1867) and Ex parte Garland, 71 U.S. 333 (1866), Black said that test oaths were anathema to the Constitution. "This feeling was made manifest in Article VI of the Constitution, which provides that 'no religious Test shall ever be required as a Qualification to any Office or public Trust under the United States.'" Illinois has the power to draft its citizens, and to punish them for refusing to serve in its militia, Black said, but it does not have the right to assume beforehand that Summers would take the bar association oath in bad faith and fail to fulfill it at some indeterminate time in the future. This thinking had been rejected by Associate Justice Oliver Wendell Holmes Jr. in his dissent in United States v. Schwimmer, 279 U.S. 644 (1929), and by Chief Justice Charles Evans Hughes in his dissent in United States v. Macintosh, 283 U.S. 605 (1931), and Black embraced their views. Finally, Black noted that Illinois had not imposed a draft since 1864 and that the majority was engaging in mere speculation about imposing one in the future. There was no violation of the oath, and no actual inability to uphold the state constitution, Black concluded. "[T]he probability that Illinois would ever call the petitioner to serve in a war has little more reality than an imaginary quantity in mathematics. I cannot agree that a state can lawfully bar from a semi-public position a well qualified man of good character solely because he entertains a religious belief which might prompt him at some time in the future to violate a law which has not yet been and may never be enacted."

Black would have overturned the decision of the Illinois Supreme Court.

== Subsequent developments ==
Chief Justice Stone cast the deciding vote in the case. Although his vote contradicted the vast majority of his previous "freedom of religion" votes and decisions, Stone's reasons for deciding against free exercise in this case are not recorded.

=== Legacy ===
The Court's ruling in In re Summers has been sharply criticized. Despite Justice Reed's stated respect for Summers' religious beliefs, Reed denigrated him as a "religionist" (someone whose beliefs are not thought through and imfirmly held). Reed also imposed his own theology on the Christian Bible, openly criticizing Summers for misinterpreting its tenets and for practicing (rather than merely reading) it. One historian has said that "Justice Stanley Reed's majority opinion [is] lacking in any analysis of the serious constitutional issue involved". A legal scholar has said that Reed's decision is "merely" that Illinois had the right to interpret its oath however it chose.

The dissents of Holmes in Schwimmer, Hughes in Macintosh, and Black in In re Summers have since become the majority view of the Supreme Court. Schwimmer and Macintosh were overruled in Girouard v. United States, 328 U.S. 61 (1946). But even though the cases which formed the basis of the decision in In re Summers were disavowed, the Court reaffirmed Summers in 1950 in American Communications Association v. Douds, 339 U.S. 382 (1950). In re Summers became the basis for the Court to uphold a number of loyalty oath cases during the Cold War.

=== Litigant's later activities ===
Summers later was admitted to the New York State Bar Association and became one of the most respected legal educators in the United States. He was highly influential in the field of labor law, and was considered the nation's leading expert on union democracy. "What Louis Brandeis was to the field of privacy law, Clyde Summers is to the field of union democracy," wrote Widener University School of Law professor Michael J. Goldberg in the summer of 2010. "Summers, like Brandeis, provided the theoretical foundation for an important new field of law."

== Bibliography ==
- Goldberg, Michael J. "Present at the Creation: Clyde Summers and the Field of Union Democracy Law." Employee Rights and Employment Policy Journal. 14:121 (2010).
- Jacobs, James B. Mobsters, Unions, and Feds: The Mafia and the American Labor Movement. New York: New York University Press, 2006.
- Konvitz, Milton Ridvas. Fundamental Liberties of a Free People: Religion, Speech, Press, Assembly. New Brunswick, N.J.: Transaction Publishers, 2003.
- Kramer, Daniel C. The Price of Rights: The Courts, the Welfare State, and Civil Liberties. Frankfurt, Ky.: P. Lang, 2003.
- Kutulas, Judy. The American Civil Liberties Union and the Making of Modern Liberalism: 1930-1960. Chapel Hill, N.C.: University of North Carolina Press, 2006.
- Schultz, Jeffrey D.; West, John G.; and MacLean, Iain S. Encyclopedia of Religion in American Politics. Phoenix, Ariz.: Oryx Press, 1999.
- Shearer, Benjamin F. Home Front Heroes. Westport, Conn.: Greenwood Press, 2007.
- Sheffer, Martin S. God Versus Caesar: Belief, Worship, and Proselytizing Under the First Amendment. Albany, N.Y.: State University of New York Press, 1999.
- Walker, Samuel. In Defense of American Liberties: A History of the ACLU. Carbondale, Ill.: Southern Illinois University Press, 1999.
