= Robert Morss Lovett =

American politician and educator (1870–1956)

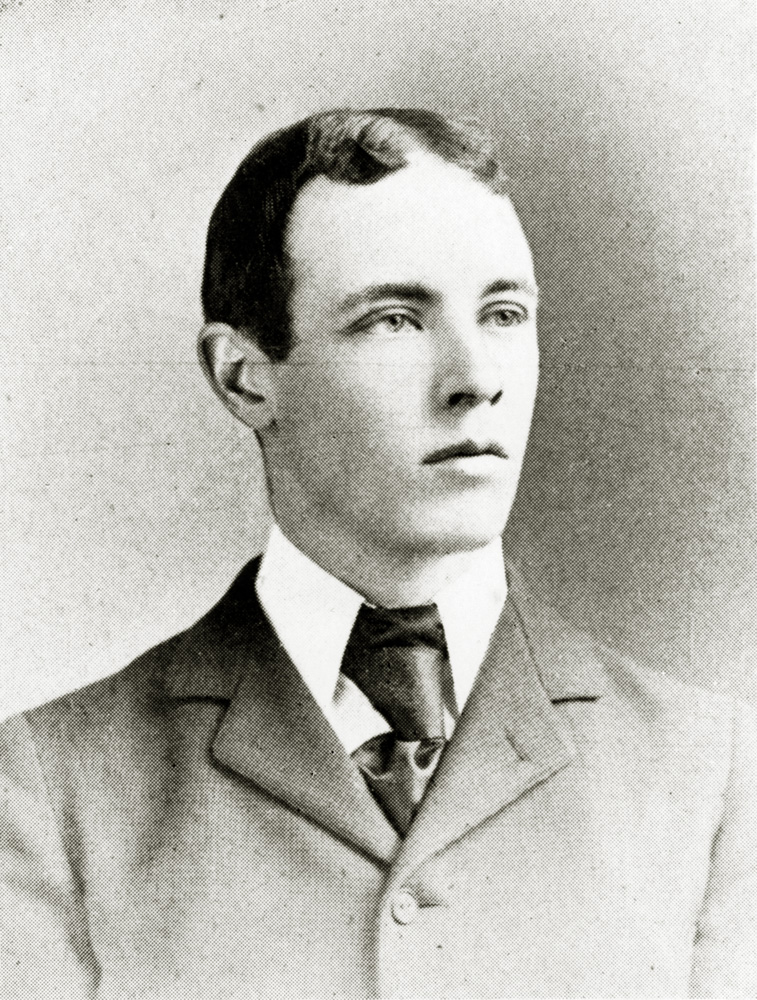
Lovett c. 1892

Robert Morss Lovett (December 25, 1870 – February 8, 1956) was an American academic, writer, editor, political activist, and government official.

== Background ==
Lovett was born in Boston, Massachusetts, and graduated from Harvard University in 1892. While a student at Harvard, he joined Delta Upsilon fraternity.

== Career ==
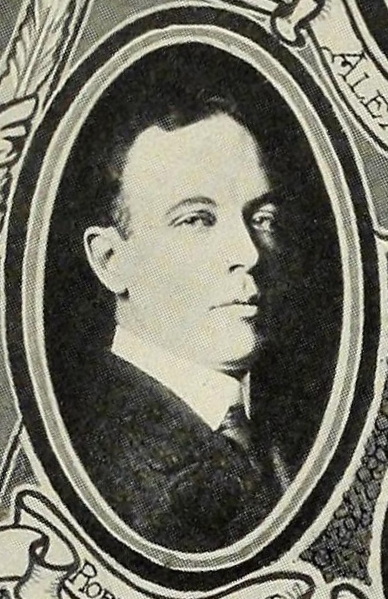
Lovett in the University of Chicago yearbook, 1907

After a period teaching at Harvard, Lovett came to Chicago in 1893 to teach writing and English literature at the University of Chicago. He was assistant professor of English (1894–1904); associate professor from 1904 to 1909; and full professor from 1909 onward. From 1903 to 1920 he was dean in the junior college. He was a member of the National Institute of Arts and Letters. Professor Lovett was the author of The History of English Literature, with W. V. Moody (1902); Richard Gresham, a novel (1904); The First View of English Literature, with W. V. Moody (1905); A Winged Victory, a novel (1907); and Cowards, a play (1914). He served as editor of the Dial in 1917 and joined the editorial staff of The New Republic in 1921. He assisted Tarak Nath Das.

Lovett was associate editor of The New Republic magazine in 1921–40, and a signer, in 1933, of the first Humanist Manifesto.

Lovett was elected the first president of the League for Industrial Democracy in 1921, serving until 1939, when the philosopher John Dewey was elected to succeed him.

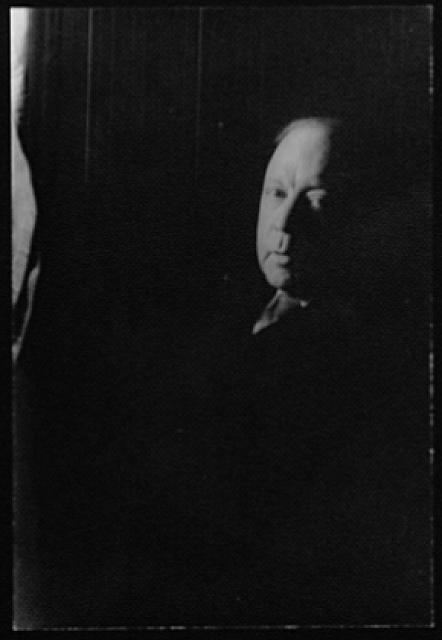
Portrait by Carl Van Vechten, 1932

As Government Secretary of the Virgin Islands in 1939–43, Lovett served as acting Governor from December 14, 1940, until February 3, 1941.

In 1943, the Dies Committee charged him as a communist subversive, over his association with left-wing individuals and groups; through an enactment passed by both houses of Congress, he was forced out of the Secretary position and barred from federal employment. Lovett, who denied he was a Communist, challenged this action through the courts as an unconstitutional bill of attainder, and though he did not get the job back, he won a 1946 decision from the Supreme Court (United States v. Lovett), and received back pay.

== Personal life and death ==
Lovett spent many years living at Hull House, where his wife Isa Mott Smith was aide to Jane Addams. He died in St. Joseph's Hospital in Chicago in 1956.

== Selected works ==
- Moody, William Vaughn; Lovett, Robert Morss (1902). A history of English literature. New York City: Charles Scribner's sons. viii, 433 pages.
  Condensed and revised as:
  - Moody, William Vaughn; Lovett, Robert Morss (1905). A first view of English literature. New York City: Charles Scribner's sons. x, 386 pages
  - Moody, William Vaughn; Lovett, Robert Morss; Boynton, Percy Holmes (1905). A first view of English and American literature. New York City: Charles Scribner's Sons.
- Lovett, Robert Morss (1933). "The idea of revolution". In Schmalhausen, Samuel Daniel (ed.). Recovery through revolution. New York City: Covici, Friede, Inc.

== Sources ==
- Review of Liberal to a Fault., by Robert Morss Lovett. Time (Jun. 21, 1948).
- "Robert M. Lovett, Educator, Is Dead" (obituary). New York Times (Feb. 9, 1956), p. 31.

Preceded by Lawrence William Cramer	Governor of the U.S. Virgin Islands; 1940–1941 (Acting Governor)	Succeeded by Charles Harwood
