= List of United States Supreme Court cases, volume 71 =

Supreme Court of the United States
- Interactive map of Supreme Court of the United States
- 38°53′26″N 77°00′16″W
- Established: March 4, 1789; 236 years ago
- Location: Washington, D.C.
- Coordinates: 38°53′26″N 77°00′16″W
- Composition method: Presidential nomination with Senate confirmation
- Authorised by: Constitution of the United States, Art. III, § 1
- Judge term length: life tenure, subject to impeachment and removal
- Number of positions: 9 (by statute)
- Website: supremecourt.gov

This is a list of cases reported in volume 71 (4 Wall.) of United States Reports, decided by the Supreme Court of the United States in 1866 and 1867.

== Nominative reports ==
In 1874, the U.S. government created the United States Reports, and retroactively numbered older privately published case reports as part of the new series. As a result, cases appearing in volumes 1–90 of U.S. Reports have dual citation forms; one for the volume number of U.S. Reports, and one for the volume number of the reports named for the relevant reporter of decisions (these are called "nominative reports").

=== John William Wallace ===
Starting with the 66th volume of U.S. Reports, the Reporter of Decisions of the Supreme Court of the United States was John William Wallace. Wallace was Reporter of Decisions from 1863 to 1874, covering volumes 68 through 90 of United States Reports which correspond to volumes 1 through 23 of his Wallace's Reports. As such, the dual form of citation to, for example, Thompson v. Bowie is 71 U.S. (4 Wall.) 463 (1867).

Wallace's Reports were the final nominative reports for the US Supreme Court; starting with volume 91, cases were identified simply as "(volume #) U.S. (page #) (year)".

== Justices of the Supreme Court at the time of 71 U.S. (4 Wall.) ==
The Supreme Court is established by Article III, Section 1 of the Constitution of the United States, which says: "The judicial Power of the United States, shall be vested in one supreme Court . . .". The size of the Court is not specified; the Constitution leaves it to Congress to set the number of justices. Under the Judiciary Act of 1789 Congress originally fixed the number of justices at six (one chief justice and five associate justices). Since 1789 Congress has varied the size of the Court from six to seven, nine, ten, and back to nine justices (always including one chief justice).

When the cases in 71 U.S. (4 Wall.) were decided the following nine justices were members of the Court:

Portrait	Justice	Office	Home State	Succeeded	Date confirmed by the Senate (Vote)	Tenure on Supreme Court
	Salmon P. Chase	Chief Justice	Ohio	Roger B. Taney	December 6, 1864 (Acclamation)	December 15, 1864 – May 7, 1873 (Died)
	James Moore Wayne	Associate Justice	Georgia	William Johnson	January 9, 1835 (Acclamation)	January 14, 1835 – July 5, 1867 (Died)
	Samuel Nelson	Associate Justice	New York	Smith Thompson	February 14, 1845 (Acclamation)	February 27, 1845 – November 28, 1872 (Retired)
	Robert Cooper Grier	Associate Justice	Pennsylvania	Henry Baldwin	August 4, 1846 (Acclamation)	August 10, 1846 – January 31, 1870 (Retired)
	Nathan Clifford	Associate Justice	Maine	Benjamin Robbins Curtis	January 12, 1858 (26–23)	January 21, 1858 – July 25, 1881 (Died)
	Noah Haynes Swayne	Associate Justice	Ohio	John McLean	January 24, 1862 (38–1)	January 27, 1862 – January 24, 1881 (Retired)
	Samuel Freeman Miller	Associate Justice	Iowa	Peter Vivian Daniel	July 16, 1862 (Acclamation)	July 21, 1862 – October 13, 1890 (Died)
	David Davis	Associate Justice	Illinois	John Archibald Campbell	December 8, 1862 (Acclamation)	December 10, 1862 – March 4, 1877 (Resigned)
	Stephen Johnson Field	Associate Justice	California	newly created seat	March 10, 1863 (Acclamation)	May 10, 1863 – December 1, 1897 (Retired)

== Notable Cases in 71 U.S. (4 Wall.) ==
=== Ex parte Milligan ===
Ex parte Milligan, 71 U.S. (4 Wall.) 2 (1866), is a Supreme Court decision that ruled unconstitutional the application of military tribunals to citizens when civilian courts are still operating. The Court held that "martial rule can never exist when the courts are open", and confined martial law to areas of "military operations, where war really prevails" and when it was a necessity to provide a substitute for a civil authority that had been overthrown.

=== Ex parte Garland ===
Ex parte Garland, 71 U.S. (4 Wall.) 333 (1866), is an important case involving the disbarment of former Confederate officials. The Supreme Court ruled that a statute prohibiting former Confederate government officials from serving in the US government was unconstitutional as being both a bill of attainder and an ex post facto law. The Court also held that lawyers are officers of the court, not officers of the United States, and that their removal must be an exercise of judicial power, not legislative power.

=== Mississippi v. Johnson ===
Mississippi v. Johnson, 71 U.S. (4 Wall.) 475 (1867), was the first suit to be brought against a President of the United States in the United States Supreme Court. The state of Mississippi attempted to sue President Andrew Johnson for enforcing Reconstruction. The Court ruled in favor of the president.

== Citation style ==
Under the Judiciary Act of 1789 the federal court structure at the time comprised District Courts, which had general trial jurisdiction; Circuit Courts, which had mixed trial and appellate (from the US District Courts) jurisdiction; and the United States Supreme Court, which had appellate jurisdiction over the federal District and Circuit courts—and for certain issues over state courts. The Supreme Court also had limited original jurisdiction (i.e., in which cases could be filed directly with the Supreme Court without first having been heard by a lower federal or state court). There were one or more federal District Courts and/or Circuit Courts in each state, territory, or other geographical region.

Bluebook citation style is used for case names, citations, and jurisdictions.

- "C.C.D." = United States Circuit Court for the District of . . .
  - e.g.,"C.C.D.N.J." = United States Circuit Court for the District of New Jersey
- "D." = United States District Court for the District of . . .
  - e.g.,"D. Mass." = United States District Court for the District of Massachusetts
- "E." = Eastern; "M." = Middle; "N." = Northern; "S." = Southern; "W." = Western
  - e.g.,"C.C.S.D.N.Y." = United States Circuit Court for the Southern District of New York
  - e.g.,"M.D. Ala." = United States District Court for the Middle District of Alabama
- "Ct. Cl." = United States Court of Claims
- The abbreviation of a state's name alone indicates the highest appellate court in that state's judiciary at the time.
  - e.g.,"Pa." = Supreme Court of Pennsylvania
  - e.g.,"Me." = Supreme Judicial Court of Maine

== List of cases in 71 U.S. (4 Wall.) ==
Case Name	Page and year	Opinion of the Court	Concurring opinion(s)	Dissenting opinion(s)	Lower Court	Disposition
Stearns v. United States	1 (1867)	per curiam	none	none	not indicated	certiorari granted
Brobst v. Brobst	2 (1867)	Chase	none	none	not indicated	remanded
Ex parte Milligan	2 (1866)	Davis	Chase	none	C.C.D. Ind.	certification
McGee v. Mathis	143 (1866)	Chase	none	none	Ark.	reversed
United States v. Hoffman	158 (1867)	Miller	none	none	N.D. Cal.	prohibition denied
Walker v. United States	163 (1866)	Chase	none	none	C.C.E.D. La.	dismissed
Brown v. Wiley	165 (1867)	Chase	none	none	Sup. Ct. D.C.	dismissed
Locke v. City of New Orleans	172 (1867)	Field	none	none	La.	affirmed
Sturdy v. Jackaway	174 (1867)	Grier	none	none	C.C.E.D. Ark.	certification
Missouri and Mississippi Railroad Company v. Rock	177 (1867)	Miller	none	none	Iowa	dismissed
United States v. Dashiel	182 (1866)	Nelson	none	none	W.D. Tex.	reversed
United States v. Allsbury	186 (1866)	Nelson	none	none	W.D. Tex.	affirmed
Leftwitch v. Lecanu	187 (1867)	Miller	none	none	C.C.E.D. La.	affirmed
City of New York v. Sheffield	189 (1867)	Miller	none	none	C.C.S.D.N.Y.	affirmed
Christy v. Pridgeon	196 (1866)	Field	none	none	E.D. Tex.	affirmed
Lanfear v. Hunley	204 (1866)	Swayne	none	none	La.	affirmed
Witherspoon v. Duncan	210 (1867)	Davis	none	none	Ark.	affirmed
Rutherford v. Geddes	220 (1867)	Miller	none	none	C.C.E.D. La.	affirmed
Evans v. Patterson	224 (1867)	Grier	none	none	C.C.W.D. Pa.	affirmed
Hughes v. United States	232 (1866)	Field	none	none	C.C.E.D. La.	affirmed
Mitchell v. St. Maxent's Lessee	237 (1866)	Davis	none	none	N.D. Fla.	affirmed
People ex rel. Duer v. City of New York	244 (1867)	Nelson	none	Chase	N.Y.	affirmed
Graham v. United States	259 (1867)	Field	none	none	D. Cal.	affirmed
Brown v. Bass	262 (1867)	Nelson	none	none	C.C.S.D. Miss.	reversed
Mitchell v. Burlington and Mount Pleasant Plank Road Company	270 (1867)	Clifford	none	none	C.C.D. Iowa	reversed
Larned v. Burlington and Mount Pleasant Plank Road Company	275 (1867)	Clifford	none	none	C.C.D. Iowa	reversed
Cummings v. Missouri	277 (1867)	Field	none	Miller	Mo.	reversed
Ex parte Garland	333 (1867)	Field	none	Miller	original	confirmed to bar
Barrows v. Kindred	399 (1867)	Swayne	none	none	C.C.S.D. Ill.	reversed
United States v. Hathaway	404 (1867)	Nelson	none	none	C.C.E.D. Mich.	certification
United States v. Quimby	408 (1867)	Nelson	none	none	C.C.E.D. Mich.	certification
Gilman v. Lockwood	409 (1867)	Clifford	none	none	C.C.D. Wis.	reversed
The Moses Taylor	411 (1867)	Field	none	none	San Francisco County Ct.	reversed
Semple v. Hagar	431 (1867)	Grier	none	none	Cal.	dismissed
Rock Island County v. United States	435 (1867)	Swayne	none	none	C.C.N.D. Ill.	affirmed
Davidson v. Lanier	447 (1867)	Chase	none	none	N.D. Miss.	reversed
Bradley v. Illinois	459 (1867)	Nelson	none	none	Ill.	reversed
Thompson v. Bowie	463 (1867)	Davis	none	Grier	Sup. Ct. D.C.	reversed
Mississippi v. Johnson	475 (1867)	Chase	none	none	original	dismissed
Saulet v. Shepherd	502 (1867)	Grier	none	none	C.C.E.D. La.	affirmed
Bentley v. Coyne	509 (1867)	Clifford	none	none	C.C.E.D. Mich.	affirmed
Purcell v. Miner I	513 (1867)	Grier	none	none	Sup. Ct. D.C.	affirmed
Purcell v. Miner II	519 (1867)	Grier	none	none	Sup. Ct. D.C.	rehearing denied
Commissioner of Patents v. Whiteley	522 (1867)	Swayne	none	none	Sup. Ct. D.C.	reversed
Von Hoffman v. City of Quincy	535 (1867)	Swayne	none	none	C.C.S.D. Ill.	reversed
The Hine v. Trevor	555 (1867)	Miller	none	none	Iowa	reversed
Newell v. Nixon	572 (1866)	Clifford	none	none	C.C.E.D. La.	affirmed
Sparrow v. Strong	584 (1867)	Chase	none	none	Nev.	dismissed
Bell v. Mobile and Ohio Railroad Company	598 (1867)	Davis	none	none	N.D. Miss.	affirmed
Ryan v. Thomas	603 (1867)	Chase	none	none	Mo.	dismissed
Pearson v. Duane	605 (1867)	Davis	none	none	C.C.D. Cal.	certification
Ware v. United States	617 (1867)	Clifford	none	none	C.C.E.D. Pa.	affirmed
The Nassau	634 (1867)	Davis	none	none	C.C.S.D.N.Y.	affirmed
United States v. Le Baron	642 (1866)	Miller	none	none	C.C.S.D. Ala.	reversed
New Orleans Railroad Company v. Lindsay	650 (1866)	Swayne	none	none	C.C.E.D. La.	affirmed
Robbins v. City of Chicago	657 (1867)	Clifford	none	none	C.C.N.D. Ill.	affirmed
United States v. McMasters	680 (1866)	Nelson	none	none	C.C.E.D. La.	affirmed

== See also ==
certificate of division
