= United States v. Lovett =

- Supreme Court of the United States

Argued May 3–6, 1946 Decided June 3, 1946
- Full case name: United States v. Lovett, consolidated with United States v. Watson, and United States v. Dodd
- Citations: 328 U.S. 303 (more) 66 S. Ct. 1073; 90 L. Ed. 1252

Case history
- Prior: Lovett v. United States, 66 F. Supp. 142 (Ct. Cl. 1945); cert. granted, 327 U.S. 773 (1946).

Court membership
- Chief Justice vacant Associate Justices Hugo Black · Stanley F. Reed; Felix Frankfurter · William O. Douglas; Frank Murphy · Robert H. Jackson; Wiley B. Rutledge · Harold H. Burton

Case opinions
- Majority: Black, joined by Douglas, Murphy, Jackson, Rutledge, Burton
- Concurrence: Frankfurter, joined by Reed
- Jackson took no part in the consideration or decision of the case.

Laws applied
- U.S. Const. art. I, § 9

United States v. Lovett, 328 U.S. 303 (1946), was a United States Supreme Court case in which the Court held that Congress may not forbid the payment of a salary to a specific individual, as it would constitute an unconstitutional bill of attainder.

== Background ==
In February 1943, the Democratic chairman of the House Un-American Activities Committee, Martin Dies, gave a speech at the floor on the House of Representatives accusing 39 unspecified government employees of "subversive" activities. An amendment was proposed to defund the salaries of the 39 people whom Dies had "indicted". After some debate, the matter was referred to a special subcommittee of the Appropriations Committee, which held secret hearings chaired by John H. Kerr. The subcommittee created a definition of "subversive" activity and decided that Goodwin B. Watson, William E. Dodd, Jr. and Robert Morss Lovett were guilty of such activity. Despite attempted interventions by many supporters, including noted federal judge Learned Hand (a friend of Lovett's) and Lovett's superior, Secretary of the Interior Harold L. Ickes, the subcommittee recommended that Lovett be removed from office.

Kerr proposed as part of the appropriations bill a section denying the payment of a salary to Watson, Dodd, and Lovett. Although divisive, his measure passed the House. The Senate Appropriations Committee and the full Senate unanimously and repeatedly rejected the measure. However, the House made it clear that they would not approve an appropriations bill without the provision and after five conference reports, the Senate finally acceded and passed a version of the Urgent Deficiency Appropriation Act of 1943 that included Kerr's provision. President Roosevelt signed the bill while simultaneously declaring his belief that Kerr's provision was unconstitutional.

The provision mandated that the three would not receive payment for any work performed after November 15, 1943. Nonetheless, all three continued to work for some time after that date and filed for back pay with the Court of Claims. The three were victorious before the Court of Claims, and the government appealed to the Supreme Court, which heard the cases in a consolidated argument in 1946. The Court heard the case as a seven-member panel, with Justice Jackson recused and Chief Justice Stone having died a month before oral arguments.

== Opinion of the Court ==
The Court, in a decision authored by Justice Hugo Black, ruled unanimously to uphold the decision of the Court of Claims, finding that Kerr's provision was an unconstitutional "bill of pains and penalties" (forbidden under the Bill of Attainder Clause of Article One of the Constitution). Justice Frankfurter, joined by Justice Reed, concurred in the result. However, he took issue with the Court's characterization of the provision as a bill of attainder and, citing the principle of constitutional avoidance, avoided ruling the provision unconstitutional by concluding that while Kerr's provision "prevented the ordinary disbursal of money to pay respondents' salaries", "[it] did not cut off the obligation of the Government to pay for services rendered". To define what a bill of attainder was for purpose of American law, the Court looked back to Cummings v. Missouri (1867) and Ex Parte Garland (1866). Lovett was the first time since the Reconstruction era that the Supreme Court reexamined its Bill of Attainder jurisprudence, although state and lower federal courts had confronted the issue at various points since.

== Subsequent developments ==
Following the Supreme Court's decision, the Republican-controlled House Appropriations Committee refused to allocate the $2,158 (about $40,151 today) to return the back salary to the three men. However, the full House of Representatives narrowly voted to appropriate the funds and the three men received their money. However, in the same budget in which the entire House authorized the back pay for the three men, it again tried to deny funding for the salary of Edgar Warren, the Director of the Federal Mediation and Conciliation Service; on this issue, Senator William F. Knowland refused to budge on the issue and the House eventually agreed to fund Warren's salary (although he resigned after the appropriation was passed).
