= Common law of business balance =

Principle that one cannot pay a little and get a lot

The common law of business balance, often expressed as "you get what you pay for", is the principle that one cannot pay a little and get a lot. That is, paying a cheap price will not guarantee the buyer will receive a product of high quality value. In other words, a low price of a good may indicate that the producer compromised quality.

== Versions with variant wording ==
The statement is often displayed or published in a one-sentence version: "There is hardly anything in the world that cannot be made a little worse and sold a little cheaper, and those who consider price alone are that man's lawful prey." This quote is often attributed to the British artist and poet, John Ruskin. Or simply, "you get what you pay for."

This statement is also found in this lengthier version: "There is hardly anything in the world that cannot be made a little worse and sold a little cheaper, and those who consider price alone are that man's lawful prey. It's unwise to pay too much, but it's worse to pay too little. When you pay too much, you lose a little money – that is all. When you pay too little, you sometimes lose everything, because the thing you bought was incapable of doing the thing it was bought to do. The common law of business balance prohibits paying a little and getting a lot – it can't be done. If you deal with the lowest bidder, it is well to add something for the risk you run, and if you do that you will have enough to pay for something better."

== Questions of authorship ==
The statement has frequently been attributed to 19th-century art critic and social thinker John Ruskin, although there is little evidence to support Ruskin's authorship.

In the Yale Book of Quotations, editor Fred R. Shapiro states that this statement was "Attributed in Chicago Daily Tribune, 29 Jan. 1928. This quotation, repeated in many commercial advertisements, has not been found anywhere in Ruskin's works. An earlier unattributed occurrence appeared in The Washington Post, 1 Nov. 1914: "There is absolutely nothing in the world that some man cannot make a little worse and sell a little cheaper; and the people who consider price only are this man's lawful prey." Shapiro maintains that the statement does not appear anywhere in Ruskin's works.

George Landow, a professor of English and art history at Brown University and a specialist on Victorian literature is also skeptical of Ruskin's authorship of this statement.

In a posting of the Ruskin Library News, a blog associated with the Ruskin Library (a major collection of Ruskiniana located at Lancaster University), an anonymous library staff member briefly mentions the statement and its widespread use, saying that, "This is one of many quotations ascribed to Ruskin, without there being any trace of them in his writings – although someone, somewhere, thought they sounded like Ruskin." Ruth Hutchison, who maintains the website for the Ruskin Centre at Lancaster University, stated that, "we have been asked many times about this quote, or similar versions of it, and have never been able to identify it as being by Ruskin. We suspect that it has been wrongly attributed to him in the past and found its way into a book of quotations or something like that."

In an issue of the journal, Heat Transfer Engineering, Bell quotes the statement and mentions that it has been attributed to Ruskin. While Bell believes in the veracity of the content of the statement, he adds that the statement does not appear in Ruskin's published works.

== Appearances in trade magazines and other publications ==
In the 20th century, this statement appeared—without any authorship attribution—in magazine advertisements, business catalogs, student publications, and, occasionally, in editorial columns.

Also in the 20th century and continuing into the 21st century, newspaper advertisements, magazine advertisements, trade publications, student publications, business books, technical publications, business catalogs, and other publications often included the statement with attribution to Ruskin.

== Displays of the statement at Baskin-Robbins ==
For many years, various Baskin-Robbins ice cream parlors prominently displayed a section of the statement in framed signs. ("There is hardly anything in the world that someone cannot make a little worse and sell a little cheaper, and the people who consider price alone are that man's lawful prey.") The signs listed Ruskin as the author of the statement, but the signs gave no information on where or when Ruskin was supposed to have written, spoken, or published the statement.
