= Mississippi v. Johnson =

- Supreme Court of the United States

Argued April 12, 1867 Decided April 15, 1867
- Full case name: The State of Mississippi v. Andrew Johnson, President of the United States
- Citations: 71 U.S. 475 (more) 4 Wall. 475; 18 L. Ed. 437

Holding
- In the course of his enforcement of the Reconstruction Acts, President Johnson was necessarily exercising discretion and so could not be sued.

Court membership
- Chief Justice Salmon P. Chase Associate Justices James M. Wayne · Samuel Nelson; Robert C. Grier · Nathan Clifford; Noah H. Swayne · Samuel F. Miller; David Davis · Stephen J. Field

Case opinion
- Majority: Chase, joined by unanimous

Mississippi v. Johnson, 71 U.S. (4 Wall.) 475 (1867), was the first case in which the Supreme Court of the United States considered whether the President of the United States could be enjoined from performing his official duties. The state of Mississippi sought an injunction against President Andrew Johnson to prevent him from enforcing the Reconstruction Acts. The Court concluded that assigning generals to command the military districts and supervising their activities as commander-in-chief involved purely executive and political functions, rather than ministerial duties subject to judicial enforcement. It distinguished Marbury v. Madison (1803) and Kendall v. United States ex rel. Stokes (1838), which recognized the availability of mandamus for ministerial, but not discretionary, duties. The Court further observed that the requested injunction had no precedent and that the distinction between restraining executive action and compelling it did not remove the case from the principles against judicial interference with executive discretion. It also expressed concern that an injunction could put the President in an untenable position by requiring him to choose between obeying a judicial order and carrying out his constitutional responsibilities, with either course potentially exposing him to impeachment.

== See also ==
- United States v. Nixon (1974)
- Nixon v. Fitzgerald (1982)
- Clinton v. Jones (1997)
