= Cummings v. Missouri =

- Supreme Court of the United States

Argued March 17, March 20, 1866 Argued March 19 – March 20, 1866 Reargued March 16, 1866 Decided January 14, 1867
- Full case name: John A. Cummings v. Missouri
- Citations: 71 U.S. 277 (more) 4 Wall. 277, 18 L. 350
- Related cases: Ex parte Garland
- Argument: Oral argument
- Opinion announcement: Opinion announcement

Case history
- Prior: Circuit Trial Court of Pike County, Supreme Court of Missouri
- Subsequent: Reverent Cummings was found guilty and sentenced to pay a fine of $500 and imprisonment until the fine and costs of suit were paid

Questions presented
- Do the state and national oaths violate prohibitions against ex post facto laws and bills of attainder of the Constitution?

Holding
- The oath laws transformed acts that had not been forbidden into crimes and increased the punishment of acts that were known to be crimes. The oath laws were also bills of attainder since they were legislative acts that inflicted punishment without the benefit of a trial by a judge.

Court membership
- Chief Justice Salmon P. Chase Associate Justices James M. Wayne · Samuel Nelson; Robert C. Grier · Nathan Clifford; Noah H. Swayne · Samuel F. Miller; David Davis · Stephen J. Field

Case opinions
- Majority: Field, joined by Wayne, Nelson, Grier, Cliford
- Dissent: Chase, joined by Miller, Swayne, Davis

Laws applied
- Article I, Section 9 of Constitution of the United States

Cummings v. Missouri, 71 U.S. 277 (1867), 4 Wall 277, 18 L. 350, also known as the Test-Oath case, is an 1867 landmark decision of the Supreme Court of the United States, in which the court held in a 5-4 decision that both state and national oath laws are unconstitutional. Cummings was a companion case of Ex parte Garland, which were also referred to as the Test-Oath Cases. Cummings involved Fr John A. Cummings, a Catholic priest who refused to take an anti-Confederacy oath that was required by the Missouri Constitution; the lower court found him guilty of perjury and sentenced to pay a $500 fine and imprisonment of not less than two years.

Cummings' defense argued that the charges violated the prohibitions of Article I, Section 9, of the Constitution of the United States, prohibiting bills of attainder and ex post facto laws. The Supreme Court decision came just after the American Civil War. Justice Stephen J. Field wrote a concurring opinion stating: "Both state and national oath laws were unconstitutional. The oath laws transformed acts that had not been forbidden into crimes and increased the punishment of acts that were known to be crimes. The oath laws were also bills of attainder since they were legislative acts that inflicted punishment without the benefit of a trial by a judge."

== Background ==
In January 1865, during the American Civil War period; A Missouri Constitutional convention to amend the Constitution of Missouri was held in St. Louis, Missouri. The convention was attended by the representatives who was elected in November 1864. In April 1865, the Missouri constitution was finally amended and ratified, and in June 1865, it was adopted by the convention after a unanimous vote. The new amendment aims to forbid anyone to engage in certain jobs such as preaching, practicing law, practicing medicine and teaching, unless they took an oath that they won't support the confederacy in any way either in thought, word or deed.

In September 1865, 2 months after the adoption of State's Constitution, John A. Cummings, a priest of Roman Catholic Church of Pike County, Missouri; was charged and convicted in the Circuit Court of Pike County of crime of teaching and preaching as a priest and a minister of religious denomination, without having first taken an oath in accordance with the Section 9 of Article II of Missouri Constitution, that no one shall assume of any duties or other offices of any state, city, county or town, without having first taken an oath.

In Article II, Section 3, 6, 7, 9 and 14 it was said by State's Constitution that:

"SEC. 3. At any election held by the people under this Constitution, or in pursuance of any law of this State, or under any ordinance or by-law of any municipal corporation, no person shall be deemed a qualified voter, who has ever been in armed hostility to the United States, or to the lawful authorities thereof, or to the government of this State; or has ever given aid, comfort, countenance, or support to persons engaged in any such hostility; or has ever, in any manner, adhered to the enemies, foreign or domestic, of the United States, either by contributing to them, or by unlawfully sending within their lines, money, goods, letters, or information; or has ever disloyally held communication with such enemies; or has ever advised or aided any person to enter the service of such enemies; or has ever, by act or word, manifested his adherence to the cause of such enemies, or his desire for their triumph over the arms of the United States, or his sympathy with those engaged in exciting or carrying on rebellion against the United States; or has ever, except under overpowering compulsion, submitted to the authority, or been in the service, of the so-called 'Confederate States of America;' or has ever left this State, and gone within the lines of the armies of the so-called 'Confederate States of America,' with the purpose of adhering to said States or armies; or has ever been a member of, or connected with, any order, society, or organization, inimical to the government of the United States, or to the government of this State; or has ever been engaged in guerilla warfare against loyal inhabitants of the United States, or in that description of marauding commonly known as 'bush-whacking;' or has ever knowingly and willingly harbored, aided, or countenanced any person so engaged; or has ever come into or left this State, for the purpose of avoiding enrollment for or draft into the military service of the United States; or has ever, with a view to avoid enrollment in the militia of this State, or to escape the performance of duty therein, or for any other purpose, enrolled himself, or authorized himself to be enrolled, by or before any officer, as disloyal, or as a southern sympathizer, or in any other terms indicating his disaffection to the Government of the United States in its contest with rebellion, or his sympathy with those engaged in such rebellion; or, having ever voted at any election by the people in this State, or in any other of the United States, or in any of their Territories, or held office in this State, or in any other of the United States, or in any of their Territories, or under the United States, shall thereafter have sought or received, under claim of alienage, the protection of any foreign government, through any consul or other officer thereof, in order to secure exemption from military duty in the militia of this State, or in the army of the United States; nor shall any such person be capable of holding in this State any office of honor, trust, or profit, under its authority; or of being an officer, councilman, director, trustee, or other manager of any corporation, public or private, now existing or hereafter established by its authority; or of acting as a professor or teacher in any educational institution, or in any common or other school; or of holding any real estate or other property in trust for the use of any church, religious society, or congregation. But the foregoing provisions, in relation to acts done against the United States, shall not apply to any person not a citizen thereof, who shall have committed such acts while in the service of some foreign country at war with the United States, and who has, since such acts, been naturalized, or may hereafter be naturalized, under the laws of the United States and the oath of loyalty hereinafter prescribed, when taken by any such person, shall be considered as taken in such sense."

"SEC. 6. The oath to be taken as aforesaid shall be known as the Oath of Loyalty, and shall be in the following terms:"

" I, A. B., do solemnly swear that I am well acquainted with the terms of the third section of the second article of the Constitution of the State of Missouri, adopted in the year eighteen hundred and sixty-five, and have carefully considered the same; that I have never, directly or indirectly, done any of the acts in said section specified; that I have always been truly and loyally on the side of the United States against all enemies thereof, foreign and domestic; that I will bear true faith and allegiance to the United States, and will support the Constitution and laws thereof as the supreme law of the land, any law or ordinance of any State to the contrary notwithstanding; that I will, to the best of my ability, protect and defend the Union of the United States, and not allow the same to be broken up and dissolved, or the government thereof to be destroyed or overthrown, under any circumstances, if in my power to prevent it; that I will support the Constitution of the State of Missouri; and that I make this oath without any mental reservation or evasion, and hold it to be binding on me."

"SEC. 7. Within sixty days after this Constitution takes effect, every person in this State holding any office of honor, trust, or profit, under the Constitution or laws thereof, or under any municipal corporation, or any of the other offices, positions, or trusts, mentioned in the third section of this Article, shall take and subscribe the said oath. If any officer or person referred to in this section shall fail to comply with the requirements thereof, his office, position, or trust, shall, ipso facto, become vacant, and the vacancy shall be filled according to the law governing the case."

"SEC. 9. No person shall assume the duties of any state, county, city, town, or other office, to which he may be appointed, otherwise than by a vote of the people; nor shall any person, after the expiration of sixty days after this Constitution takes effect, be permitted to practise as an attorney or counselor at law; nor, after that time, shall any person be competent as a bishop, priest, deacon, minister, elder, or other clergyman of any religious persuasion, sect, or denomination, to teach, or preach, or solemnize marriages, unless such person shall have first taken, subscribed, and filed said oath."

"SEC. 14. Whoever shall, after the times limited in the seventh and ninth sections of this Article, hold or exercise any of the offices, positions, trusts, professions, or functions therein specified, without having taken, subscribed, and filed said oath of loyalty, shall, on conviction thereof, be punished by fine, not less than five hundred dollars, or by imprisonment in the county jail not less than six months, or by both such fine and imprisonment; and whoever shall take said oath falsely, by swearing or by affirmation, shall, on conviction thereof, be adjudged guilty of perjury, and be punished by imprisonment in the penitentiary not less than two years."

Cummings was found guilty of perjury and was sentenced to pay a fine of $ 500, and imprisonment of 2 years. Cummings appeal to the Supreme Court of Missouri, however, the state's supreme court affirmed the lower court's decision. Cummings brought the case and filed a coram nobis the Supreme Court of the United States.

== Issues ==
Whether Missouri's Test Oath, as a condition on voting, professions, and ministry, (1) constituted a prohibited bill of attainder by legislatively inflicting punishment without a judicial trial, and/or (2) violated the ex post facto clause by retroactively imposing punishment for past acts that were not criminal when done or by increasing punishment for past offenses.

== Decision ==
The Court held the Test Oath unconstitutional. As applied to Cummings, the oath "partakes of the nature of a bill of pains and penalties" because it legislatively imposed punishment (civil disabilities and criminal sanctions) on a class identified by past conduct, without a judicial trial. It also operated ex post facto by attaching new penalties to acts previously done and by making past conduct the basis for present punishment.

Justice Stephen J. Field delivered the opinion for the Court, joined by Justices Wayne, Nelson, Grier, and Clifford. The opinion reasoned that although states could require oaths as qualifications, Missouri's oath was punitive in substance: it presumed guilt from a failure to swear to an extensive catalogue of past loyalties and expressions and imposed penalties for that past conduct rather than prescribing prospective qualifications alone.

Chief Justice Salmon P. Chase dissented, joined by Justices Miller, Swayne, and Davis. The dissent viewed the oath as a permissible qualification aimed at securing the loyalty of public functionaries and professionals post-war, rather than as punishment for past acts. On this view, the provisions did not fall within the historical meaning of bills of attainder or ex post facto laws.

Decided the same day, Ex parte Garland addressed a federal attorney oath imposed by Congress. Together, the cases, sometimes called the "Test Oath Cases", invalidated retroactive loyalty oaths at both the state (Cummings) and federal (Garland) levels, grounding the analysis in the Constitution's prohibitions on bills of attainder and ex post facto laws (Art. I, § 10 for states; § 9 for federal).

By limiting the use of "test oaths" that penalized former Confederate sympathizers or those perceived as disloyal, the decision underscored that labels such as "qualification" do not control when the substance of a measure is punitive and retroactive. It remains a leading statement on the scope of the bill of attainder and ex post facto clauses as applied to state action.
