= Bill of attainder =

Legislation declaring a person guilty

A bill of attainder (also known as an act of attainder, writ of attainder, or bill of pains and penalties) is an act of a legislature declaring a person (or group of people) guilty of some crime, and providing for a punishment, often without a trial. As with attainder resulting from the normal judicial process, the effect of such a bill is to nullify the targeted person's civil rights, most notably the right to own property (and thus pass it on to heirs), the right to a title of nobility, and, in at least the original usage, the right to life itself.

In the history of England, the word "attainder" refers to people who were declared "attainted", meaning that their civil rights were nullified: they could no longer own property or pass property to their family by will or testament. Attainted people would normally be put to death, with the property left behind escheated to the Crown or lord rather than being inherited by family. The first use of a bill of attainder was in 1321 against Hugh le Despenser, 1st Earl of Winchester and his son Hugh Despenser the Younger, Earl of Gloucester, who were both attainted for supporting King Edward II. Bills of attainder passed in Parliament by Henry VIII on 29 January 1542 resulted in the executions of a number of notable historical figures.

The use of these bills by Parliament eventually fell into disfavour due to the potential for abuse and the violation of several legal principles, most importantly the right to due process, the precept that a law should address a particular form of behaviour rather than a specific individual or group, and the separation of powers, since a bill of attainder is necessarily a judicial matter. The last use of attainder was in 1798 against Lord Edward FitzGerald for leading the Irish Rebellion of 1798. The House of Lords later passed the Pains and Penalties Bill 1820, which attempted to attaint Queen Caroline, but it was not considered by the House of Commons. No bills of attainder have been passed since 1820 in the UK. Attainder remained a legal consequence of convictions in courts of law, but this ceased to be a part of punishment in 1870.

American dissatisfaction with British attainder laws resulted in attainder being prohibited by the United States Constitution in 1789. Bills of attainder are forbidden to both the federal government and the states, reflecting the importance that the Framers of the U.S. Constitution attached to this issue, and each state's constitution also expressly forbids bills of attainder. The U.S. Supreme Court has invalidated laws under the Attainder Clause on five occasions. Most common-law nations have prohibited bills of attainder, some explicitly and some implicitly, especially as punishment by attainder laws had increasingly been used to benefit those seeking to breach the common law of business balance.

== Jurisdictions ==
=== Australia ===
The Constitution of Australia contains no specific provision permitting the Commonwealth Parliament to pass bills of attainder. The High Court of Australia has ruled that federal bills of attainder are unconstitutional, because it is a violation of the separation of powers doctrine for any body to wield judicial power other than a Chapter III court—that is, a body exercising power derived from Chapter III of the Constitution, the chapter providing for judicial power. One of the core aspects of judicial power is the ability to make binding and authoritative decisions on questions of law, that is, issues relating to life, liberty or property. The wielding of judicial power by the legislative or executive branch includes the direct wielding of power and the indirect wielding of judicial power.

The state constitutions in Australia contain few limitations on government power. Bills of attainder are considered permissible because there is no entrenched separation of powers at the state level. However, section 77 of the Constitution of Australia permits state courts to be invested with Commonwealth jurisdiction, and any state law that renders a state court unable to function as a Chapter III court is unconstitutional. The states cannot structure their legal systems to prevent them from being subject to the Australian Constitution.

An important distinction is that laws seeking to direct judicial power (e.g. must make orders) are unconstitutional, but laws that concern mandatory sentencing, rules of evidence, non-punitive imprisonment, or tests, are constitutional.

State parliaments are, however, free to prohibit parole boards from granting parole to specific prisoners. For instance, sections 74AA and 74AB of the Corrections Act 1986 in Victoria significantly restrict the ability of the parole board to grant parole to Julian Knight or Craig Minogue. These have been upheld by the High Court of Australia and are distinguished from bills of attainder since the original sentence (life imprisonment) handed down by the Supreme Court of Victoria is unchanged; the law relates only to the granting (or not) of parole, which is a privilege, not a right.

=== Canada ===
In two cases of parliamentary proposals for bills (in 1984 for Clifford Olson, and in 1995 for Karla Homolka) to inflict a judicial penalty on a specific person, the speakers of the House of Commons and Senate, respectively, have ruled that the Parliament of Canada considers only public bills of general applicability, or private bills to the benefit of some individual or corporation; inasmuch as a bill of attainder is manifestly not beneficial to its recipient (in both cases prescribing their execution), it is neither a public nor a private bill, and thus is not a proper subject for consideration by Parliament.

=== United Kingdom ===
==== English law ====
The word "attainder" is part of English common law. (Note: The word "attainder" does not, in fact, derive from a Latin expression meaning "tainted", but from a French expression meaning "to attain", in the sense of condemn.) Under English law, a criminal condemned for a serious crime, whether treason or felony (but not misdemeanour, which referred to less serious crimes), could be declared "attainted", meaning that his civil rights were nullified: he could no longer own property or pass property to his family by will or testament. His property could consequently revert to the Crown or to the mesne lord. Any peerage titles would also revert to the Crown. The convicted person would normally be punished by judicial execution – when a person committed a capital crime and was put to death for it, the property left behind escheated to the Crown or lord rather than being inherited by family. Attainder functioned more or less as the revocation of the feudal chain of privilege and all rights and properties thus granted.

Due to mandatory sentencing, the due process of the courts provided limited flexibility to deal with the various circumstances of offenders. The property of criminals caught alive and put to death because of a guilty plea or jury conviction on a not guilty plea could be forfeited, as could the property of those who escaped justice and were outlawed; but the property of offenders who died before trial, except those killed during the commission of crimes (who fell foul of the law relating to felo de se), could not be forfeited, nor could the property of offenders who refused to plead and who were tortured to death through peine forte et dure.

On the other hand, when a legal conviction did take place, confiscation and "corruption of blood" (forfeiture of inheritance) sometimes appeared unduly harsh for the surviving family. In some cases (at least regarding the peerage) the Crown would eventually re-grant the convicted peer's lands and titles to his heir. It was also possible, as political fortunes turned, for a bill of attainder to be reversed. This sometimes occurred long after the convicted person was executed.

Unlike the mandatory sentences of the courts, acts of Parliament provided considerable latitude in suiting the punishment to the particular conditions of the offender's family. Parliament could also impose non-capital punishments without involving courts; such bills are called bills of pains and penalties.

Bills of attainder were sometimes criticised as a convenient way for the king to convict subjects of crimes and confiscate their property without the bother of a trial – and without the need for a conviction or indeed any evidence at all. It was however relevant to the custom of the Middle Ages, where all lands and titles were granted by a king in his role as the "fount of honour". Anything granted by the king's wish could be taken away by him. This weakened over time as personal rights became legally established.

The first use of a bill of attainder was in 1321 against Hugh le Despenser, 1st Earl of Winchester and his son Hugh Despenser the Younger, Earl of Gloucester. They were both attainted for supporting King Edward II during his struggle with the queen and barons.

In England, those executed subject to attainders include George Plantagenet, Duke of Clarence (1478); Thomas Cromwell (1540); Margaret Pole, Countess of Salisbury (1540); Catherine Howard (1542); Thomas, Lord Seymour (1549); Thomas Wentworth, Earl of Strafford (1641); Archbishop William Laud of Canterbury (1645); and James Scott, Duke of Monmouth. In the 1541 case of Catherine Howard, King Henry VIII was the first monarch to delegate royal assent, to avoid having to assent personally to the execution of his wife.

After defeating Richard III and replacing him on the throne of England following the Battle of Bosworth Field, Henry VII had Parliament pass a bill of attainder against his predecessor. It is noteworthy that this bill made no mention of the Princes in the Tower, although it does declare him guilty of "shedding of Infants blood".

Although deceased by the time of the Restoration, the regicides John Bradshaw, Oliver Cromwell, Henry Ireton, and Thomas Pride were served with a bill of attainder on 15 May 1660 backdated to 1 January 1649 (NS). After the committee stages, the bill passed both the Houses of Lords and Commons and was engrossed on 4 December 1660. This was followed with a resolution that passed both Houses on the same day:

That the Carcases of Oliver Cromwell, Henry Ireton, John Bradshaw, and Thomas Pride, whether buried in Westminster Abbey, or elsewhere, be, with all Expedition, taken up, and drawn upon a Hurdle to Tiburne, and there hanged up in their Coffins for some time; and after that buried under the said Gallows: And that James Norfolke Esquire, Serjeant at Arms attending the House of Commons, do take care that this Order be put in effectual Execution.

In 1685, when the Duke of Monmouth landed in West England and started a rebellion in an effort to overthrow his uncle, the recently enthroned James II, Parliament passed a bill of attainder against him. After the Battle of Sedgemoor, this made it possible for King James to have the captured Monmouth put summarily to death. Though legal, this was regarded by many as an arbitrary and ruthless act.

In 1753, the Jacobite leader Archibald Cameron of Lochiel was summarily put to death on the basis of a seven-year-old bill of attainder, rather than being put on trial for his recent subversive activities in Scotland. This aroused some protests in British public opinion at the time, including from people with no Jacobite sympathies.

The last use of attainder was in 1798 against Lord Edward FitzGerald for leading the Irish Rebellion of 1798. Corruption of blood was outlawed in England and Wales by the Corruption of Blood Act 1814.

==== The Great Act of Attainder ====
In 1688, King James II of England (VII of Scotland), driven off by the ascent of William III and Mary II in the Glorious Revolution, came to Ireland with the sole purpose of reclaiming his throne. After his arrival in 1689 the Parliament of Ireland assembled a list of 2,470 Protestants reported to have been disloyal to him in a bill of attainder, naming them as traitors subject to confiscation of property and their lives. While many viewed this as unwise, it was the only way to raise money for the taxes voted by Parliament; after defeat, it was used to justify a new round of confiscations.

Those on the list were to report to Dublin for sentencing. One man, Lord Mountjoy, was in the Bastille at the time and was told by the Irish Parliament that he must break out of his cell and make it back to Ireland for his punishment, or face the grisly process of being drawn and quartered.

The parliament became known in the 1800s as the "Patriot Parliament". Later defenders of the Patriot Parliament pointed out that the ensuing "Williamite Settlement forfeitures" of the 1690s named an even larger number of Jacobite suspects, most of whom had been attainted by 1699.

==== Private bills ====
In the Westminster system (and especially in the United Kingdom), a similar concept is covered by the term "private bill" (a bill which upon passage becomes a private Act). Note however that "private bill" is a general term referring to a proposal for legislation applying to a specific person; it is only a bill of attainder if it punishes them; private bills have been used in some Commonwealth countries to effect divorce. Other traditional uses of private bills include chartering corporations, changing the charters of existing corporations, granting monopolies, approving of public infrastructure and seizure of property for those, as well as enclosure of commons and similar redistributions of property. Those types of private bills operate to take away private property and rights from certain individuals, but are usually not called "bill of pains and penalties". Unlike the latter, Acts appropriating property with compensation are constitutionally uncontroversial as a form of compulsory purchase.

The last United Kingdom bill called a "Pains and Penalties Bill" was the Pains and Penalties Bill 1820 and was passed by the House of Lords in 1820, but not considered by the House of Commons; it sought to divorce Queen Caroline from King George IV and adjust her titles and property accordingly, on grounds of her alleged adultery, as did many private bills dealing with divorces of private persons.

The last bill of attainder was passed in 1798; the attainder procedure was abolished by the Forfeiture Act 1870.

==== World War I ====
During World War I the position of those Germans who held British honours and titles was considered, leading to the Titles Deprivation Act 1917, which stripped them of their British peerages and royal titles.

==== World War II ====
Previously secret British War Cabinet papers released on 1 January 2006 have shown that, as early as December 1942, the War Cabinet had discussed their policy for the punishment of the leading Axis officials if captured. British Prime Minister Winston Churchill had then advocated a policy of summary execution with the use of an act of attainder to circumvent legal obstacles. He was dissuaded by Richard Law, a junior minister at the Foreign Office, who pointed out that the United States and the Soviet Union still favoured trials.

=== United States ===
==== Colonial era ====
Bills of attainder were used throughout the 18th century in England, and were applied to British colonies as well. However, at least one American state, New York, used a 1779 bill of attainder to confiscate the property of British loyalists (called Tories) as both a penalty for their political sympathies and means of funding the rebellion. American dissatisfaction with British attainder laws resulted in their being prohibited in the U.S. Constitution ratified in 1787.

==== Constitutional bans ====
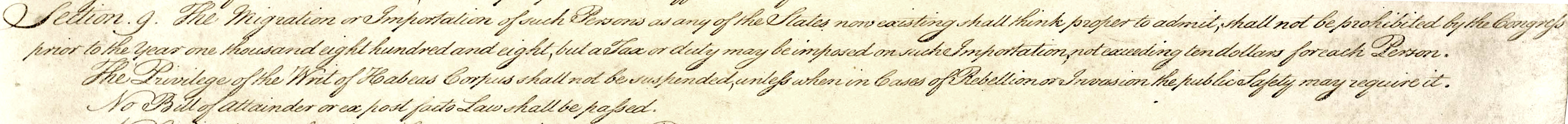
Excerpt from Article One, Section 9 of the United States Constitution, prohibiting the passing of bills of attainder

The United States Constitution forbids legislative bills of attainder: in federal law under Article I, Section 9, Clause 3 ("No Bill of Attainder or ex post facto Law shall be passed"), and in state law under Article I, Section 10. The fact that they were banned even under state law reflects the importance that the Framers attached to this issue.

Within the U.S. Constitution, the clauses forbidding attainder laws serve two purposes. First, they reinforce the separation of powers by forbidding the legislature to perform judicial or executive functions, as a bill of attainder necessarily does. Second, they embody the concept of due process, which is reinforced by the Fifth Amendment to the Constitution.

Every state constitution also expressly forbids bills of attainder. For example, Wisconsin's constitution Article I, Section 12 reads:

No bill of attainder, ex post facto law, nor any law impairing the obligation of contracts, shall ever be passed, and no conviction shall work corruption of blood or forfeiture of estate.

In contrast, the Texas Constitution omits the clause that applies to heirs. It is unclear whether a law that called for heirs to be deprived of their estate would be constitutional in Texas.

==== Supreme Court cases ====
The U.S. Supreme Court has invalidated laws under the Attainder Clause on five occasions.

Two of the Supreme Court's first decisions on the meaning of the bill of attainder clause came after the American Civil War. In Ex parte Garland, 71 U.S. 333 (1866), the court struck down a federal law requiring attorneys practising in federal court to swear that they had not supported the rebellion. In Cummings v. Missouri, 71 U.S. 277 (1867), the Missouri Constitution required anyone seeking a professional's license from the state to swear they had not supported the rebellion. The Supreme Court overturned the law and the constitutional provision, arguing that the people already admitted to practice were subject to penalty without judicial trial. The lack of judicial trial was the critical affront to the Constitution, the Court said.

Two decades later, however, the Court upheld similar laws. In Hawker v. New York, 170 U.S. 189 (1898), a state law barred convicted felons from practising medicine. In Dent v. West Virginia, 129 U.S. 114 (1889), a West Virginia state law imposed a new requirement that practising physicians had to have graduated from a licensed medical school or they would be forced to surrender their license. The Court upheld both laws because, it said, the laws were narrowly tailored to focus on an individual's qualifications to practice medicine. That was not true in Garland or Cummings.

The Court changed its "bill of attainder test" in 1946. In United States v. Lovett, 328 U.S. 303 (1946), the Court confronted a federal law that named three people as subversive and excluded them from federal employment. Previously, the Court had held that lack of judicial trial and the narrow way in which the law rationally achieved its goals were the only tests of a bill of attainder, but the Lovett Court said that a bill of attainder specifically identified the people to be punished, imposed punishment and did so without benefit of judicial trial. As all three prongs of the bill of attainder test were met in Lovett, the court held that a Congressional statute that bars particular individuals from government employment qualifies as punishment prohibited by the bill of attainder clause.

The Taft–Hartley Act (enacted in 1947) sought to ban political strikes by Communist-dominated labour unions by requiring all elected labour leaders to take an oath that they were not members of the Communist Party USA and that they did not advocate violent overthrow of the U.S. government. It also made it a crime for members of the Communist Party to serve on executive boards of labour unions. In American Communications Association v. Douds, 339 U.S. 382 (1950), the Supreme Court had said that the requirement for the oath was not a bill of attainder because anyone could avoid punishment by disavowing the Communist Party and it focused on a future act (overthrow of the government) and not a past one. Reflecting current fears, the Court commented in Douds on approving the specific focus on Communists by noting what a threat communism was. The Court had added an "escape clause" test to determining whether a law was a bill of attainder.

In United States v. Brown, 381 U.S. 437 (1965), the Court invalidated the section of the statute that criminalized a former communist serving on a union's executive board. Clearly, the Act had focused on past behaviour and had specified a specific class of people to be punished. Many legal scholars assumed that the Brown case effectively, if not explicitly, overruled Douds. The Court did not apply the punishment prong of the Douds test, leaving legal scholars confused as to whether the Court still intended it to apply.

The Supreme Court emphasized the narrowness and rationality of bills of attainder in Nixon v. Administrator of General Services, 433 U.S. 425 (1977). During the Watergate scandal, in 1974 Congress passed the Presidential Recordings and Materials Preservation Act, which required the General Services Administration to confiscate former President Richard Nixon's presidential papers to prevent their destruction, screen out those which contained national security and other issues which might prevent their publication, and release the remainder of the papers to the public as fast as possible. The Supreme Court upheld the law in Nixon, arguing that specificity alone did not invalidate the act because the President constituted a "class of one". Thus, specificity was constitutional if it was rationally related to the class identified. The Court modified its punishment test, concluding that only those laws which historically offended the bill of attainder clause were invalid. The Court also found it significant that Nixon was compensated for the loss of his papers, which alleviated the punishment. The Court modified the punishment prong by holding that punishment could survive scrutiny if rationally related to other, nonpunitive goals. Finally, the Court concluded that the legislation must not be intended to punish; legislation enacted for otherwise legitimate purposes could be saved so long as punishment was a side-effect rather than the main purpose of the law.

==== Lower court cases ====
A number of cases which raised the bill of attainder issue did not reach or have not reached the Supreme Court, but were considered by lower courts.

In 1990, in the wake of the Exxon Valdez oil spill, Congress enacted the Oil Pollution Act to consolidate various oil spill and oil pollution statutes into a single unified law, and to provide for a statutory regime for handling oil spill cleanup. This law was challenged as a bill of attainder by the shipping division of ExxonMobil.

In 2003, the United States Court of Appeals for the District of Columbia Circuit struck down the Elizabeth Morgan Act as a bill of attainder.

After the United States House of Representatives passed a resolution in late 2009 barring the community organising group Association of Community Organizations for Reform Now (ACORN) from receiving federal funding, the group sued the U.S. government. Another, broader bill, the Defund ACORN Act, was enacted by Congress later that year. In March 2010, a federal district court declared the funding ban an unconstitutional bill of attainder. On 13 August 2010, the United States Court of Appeals for the Second Circuit reversed and remanded on the grounds that only 10 percent of ACORN's funding was federal and that did not constitute "punishment".

==== Possible cases ====
There is argument over whether the Palm Sunday Compromise in the Terri Schiavo case was a bill of attainder.

Some analysts considered a proposed Congressional bill to confiscate 90 percent of the bonus money paid to executives at federally rescued investment bank American International Group a bill of attainder, although disagreement exists on the issue. The bill was not passed by Congress.

In 2009, the city of Portland, Oregon's attempt to prosecute more severely those on a "secret list" of 350 individuals deemed by police to have committed "liveability crimes" in certain neighbourhoods was challenged as an unconstitutional bill of attainder.

In 2011, the House voted to defund Planned Parenthood. Democratic Representative Jerry Nadler called that vote a bill of attainder, saying it was unconstitutional as such because the legislation was targeting a specific group.

In January 2017, the House reinstated the Holman Rule, a procedural rule that enables lawmakers to reduce the pay of an individual federal worker down to $1. It was once again removed at the beginning of the 116th United States Congress in January 2019, after Democrats had taken control of the chamber.

On November 5, 2019, the Supreme Court heard oral arguments in Allen v. Cooper. On March 23, 2020, the Supreme Court ruled in favor of North Carolina and struck down the Copyright Remedy Clarification Act, which Congress passed in 1989 to attempt to curb such infringements of copyright by states, in Allen v. Cooper.

After the ruling Nautilus Productions, the plaintiff in Allen v. Cooper, filed a motion for reconsideration in the United States District Court for the Eastern District of North Carolina. On August 18, 2021, Judge Terrence Boyle granted the motion for reconsideration which North Carolina promptly appealed to the United States Court of Appeals for the Fourth Circuit. The 4th Circuit denied the state's motion on October 14, 2022. Nautilus then filed their second amended complaint on February 8, 2023, alleging 5th and 14th Amendment violations of Nautilus' constitutional rights, additional copyright violations, and claiming that North Carolina's "Blackbeard's Law", N.C. Gen Stat §121-25(b), represents a Bill of Attainder. Eight years after the passage of "Blackbeard's Law", on June 30, 2023, North Carolina Gov. Roy Cooper signed a bill repealing the law.

President Donald Trump's executive orders targeting specific law firms, such as the executive order on March 6, 2025 entitled "Addressing Risks from Perkins Coie LLP", have been criticized as being essentially bills of attainder. Perkins Coie's suit against the Department of Justice argues that the order "shares all the essential features of a bill of attainder."

== Limitations ==
Specific individuals and groups can have negative government actions taken against them without judicial process. For example, the United States government maintains a No Fly List which partially restricts freedom of movement, and Specially Designated Nationals and Blocked Persons List, which blocks international trade. Designated terrorist groups are often sanctioned, disallowed, or criminalized; for example, the government of the United Kingdom does so through a list in the Terrorism Act 2000, which is occasionally amended.

== See also ==
- Ex post facto law, which retroactively changes the legal consequences of actions committed prior to its enactment
- Lettres de cachet, used by French kings to have people imprisoned without trial
- Spot zoning, the arbitrary application or removal of zoning restrictions from a specific parcel of land
