= Ex parte Garland =

- Supreme Court of the United States

Argued December 15, 22, 1865 Reargued March 13–15, 1866 Decided January 14, 1867
- Full case name: Ex parte Garland
- Citations: 71 U.S. 333 (more) 4 Wall. 333; 18 L. Ed. 366; 1866 U.S. LEXIS 886

Holding
- Congress cannot punish a person for a crime for which the person has been pardoned.

Court membership
- Chief Justice Salmon P. Chase Associate Justices James M. Wayne · Samuel Nelson; Robert C. Grier · Nathan Clifford; Noah H. Swayne · Samuel F. Miller; David Davis · Stephen J. Field

Case opinions
- Majority: Field, joined by Wayne, Nelson, Grier, Clifford
- Dissent: Miller, joined by Chase, Swayne, Davis

Ex parte Garland, 71 U.S. (4 Wall.) 333 (1867), was an important United States Supreme Court case involving the disbarment of former Confederate officials.

== Background ==
In January 1865, the US Congress passed a law that effectively disbarred former members of the Confederate government by requiring a loyalty oath to be recited by any federal court officer that affirmed that the officer had never served in the Confederate government.

Augustus Hill Garland, an attorney and a former Confederate Senator from Arkansas, subsequently received a pardon from US president Andrew Johnson. Garland then came before the court and pleaded that the act of Congress was a bill of attainder and an ex post facto law, which unfairly punished him for the crime for which he had been pardoned, and so was unconstitutional.

== Decision ==
In a 5–4 decision, the Supreme Court held that the law was both a bill of attainder and an ex post facto law, both forbidden by Article I, Section 9 of the Constitution. The court also ruled that the president can exercise the pardon power at any time after the commission of the crime, and that Garland was beyond the reach of punishment of any kind because of his prior presidential pardon.

The court also stated that counselors are officers of the court, not officers of the United States, and that their removal was an exercise of judicial power, not legislative power. The law was struck down as unconstitutional, which opened the way for former Confederate government officials to return to positions in the federal judiciary.
