= David Davis IV =

American politician

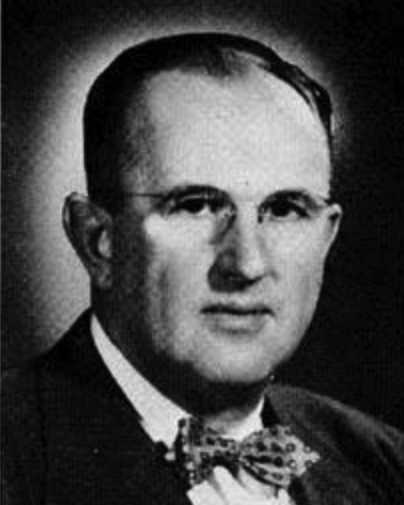
- Davis in 1957

Member of the Illinois Senate from the 26th district
- In office January 7, 1953 – January 4, 1967
- Preceded by: Wilbur J. Cash
- Succeeded by: Cecil A. Partee

Personal details
- Born: July 29, 1906 Bloomington, Illinois, U.S.
- Died: April 14, 1978 (aged 71) Peoria, Illinois, U.S.
- Party: Republican
- Spouse(s): Josephine McCormick; Nancy Sandstrom
- Education: Williams College; University of South Dakota

David Davis IV (July 29, 1906 – April 14, 1978) was an American lawyer and politician.

Davis was born in Bloomington, Illinois. His great-grandfather was David Davis, who served in the United States Senate and on the United States Supreme Court.

Davis attended Bloomington public schools and University High School. He received his bachelor's degree from Williams College and his law degree from University of South Dakota School of Law. He was admitted to the Illinois bar and opened his own law practice in Bloomington, Illinois, in 1932.

He served as Chairman of the Board of the National Bank of Bloomington from 1955 to 1977 and in the Illinois Senate from 1953 to 1967 as a Republican. He also served in the Illinois Constitutional Convention of 1969–1970.

In 1959, Davis gave the David Davis Mansion to the State of Illinois.

Davis died at the St. Francis Medical Center and Hospital in Peoria, Illinois.

The David Davis III & IV House, a site on the National Register of Historic Places in Bloomington, is named for Davis and his father.
