= Historic districts in the United States =

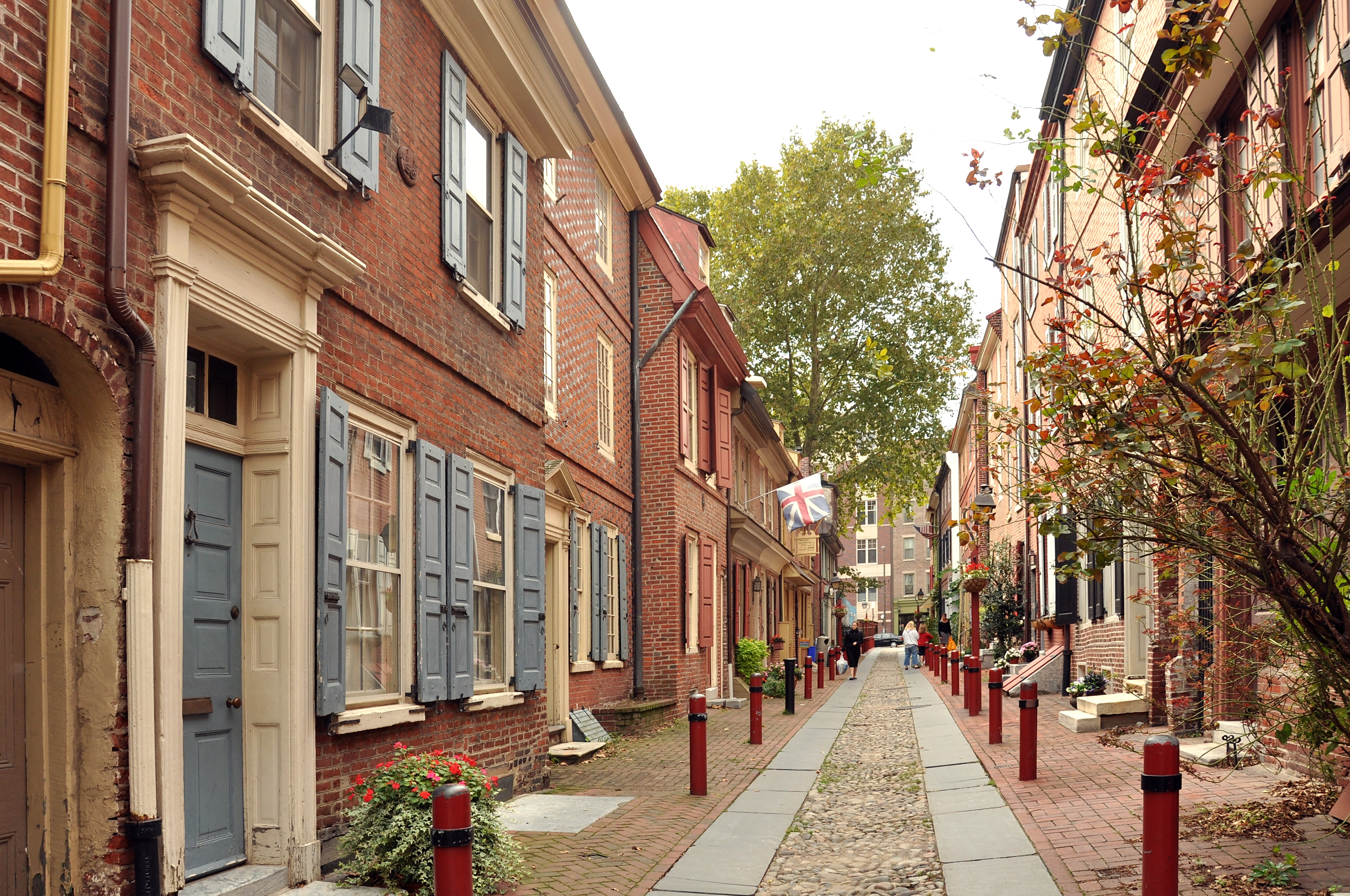
Old City Historic District in Philadelphia

Historic districts in the United States are designated historic districts recognizing a group of buildings, archaeological resources, or other properties as historically or architecturally significant. Buildings, structures, objects, and sites within a historic district are normally divided into two categories, contributing and non-contributing. Districts vary greatly in size and composition: a historic district could comprise an entire neighborhood with hundreds of buildings, or a smaller area with just one or a few resources.

Historic districts can be created by federal, state, or local governments. At the federal level, they are designated by the National Park Service and listed on the National Register of Historic Places; this is a largely honorary designation that does not restrict what property owners may do with a property. State-level historic districts usually do not include restrictions, though this depends on the state. Historic districts created by local municipalities, however, almost always protect historic properties by regulating alterations, demolition, or new construction within the district.

Much criticism has arisen of historic districts and the effect protective zoning and historic designation status laws have on the housing supply. When an area of a city is designated as part of a 'historic district', new housing development is artificially restricted and the supply of new housing permanently capped in area so designated as 'historic'. Critics of historic districts argue that while these districts may offer an aesthetic or visually pleasing benefit, they increase inequality by restricting access to new and affordable housing for lower and middle class tenants and potential home owners. Housing advocates have argued that the historic designation process has in many places been hijacked by NIMBY homeowners to block housing.

== History ==
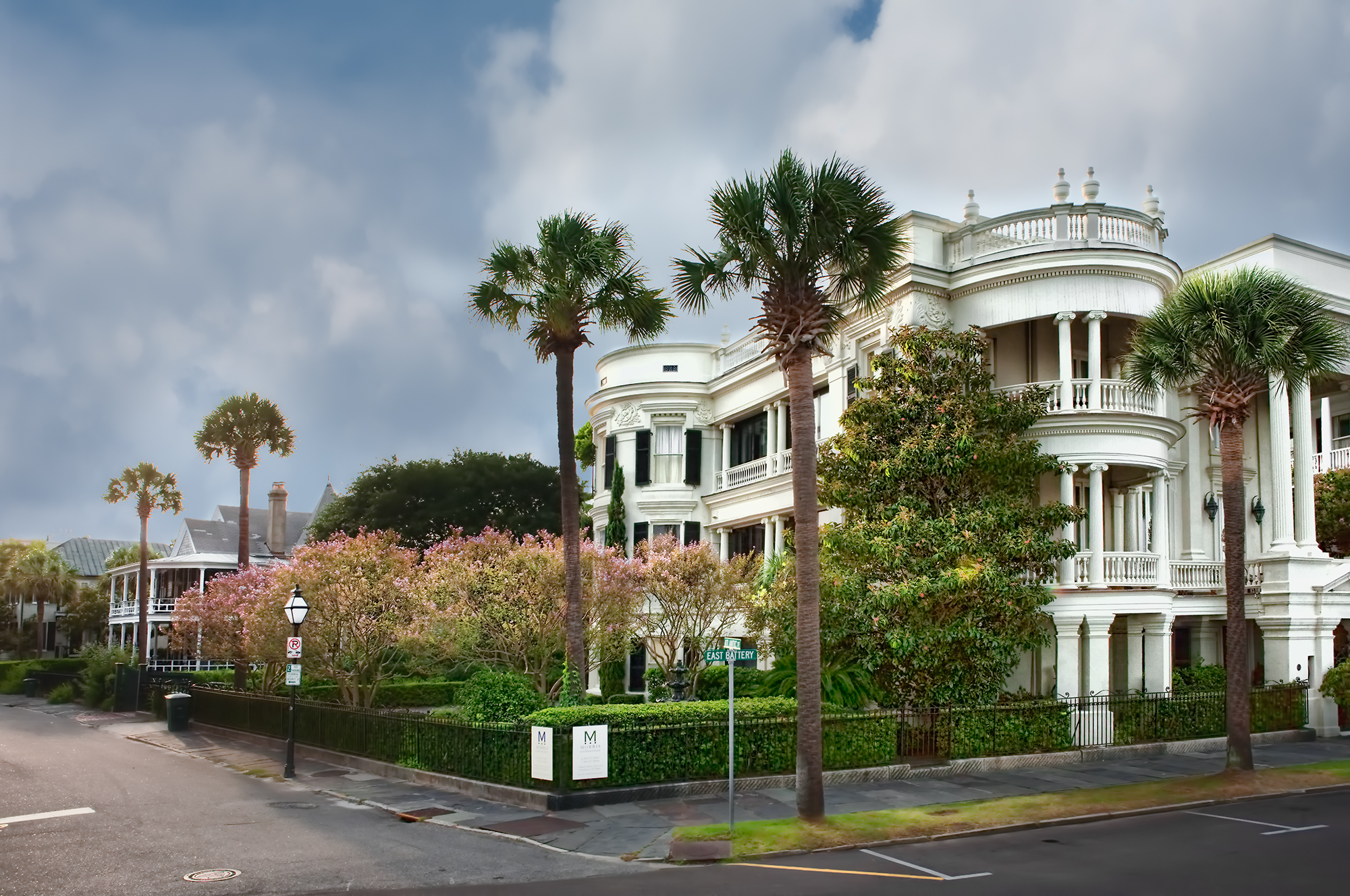
Charleston, South Carolina is home to the first historic district protected by local legislation in the United States

The first U.S. historic district was established in Charleston, South Carolina in 1931, predating the U.S. federal government designation by more than three decades. Charleston city government designated an "Old and Historic District" by local ordinance and created a board of architectural review to oversee it. New Orleans followed in 1937, establishing the Vieux Carré Commission and authorizing it to act to maintain the historic character of the city's French Quarter. Other localities picked up on the concept, with the city of Philadelphia enacting its historic preservation ordinance in 1955.

The regulatory authority of local commissions and historic districts has been consistently upheld as a legitimate use of government police power, most notably in Penn Central Transportation Co. v. City of New York (1978). The Supreme Court case validated the protection of historic resources as "an entirely permissible governmental goal." In 1966, the federal government created the National Register of Historic Places, soon after a report from the U.S. Conference of Mayors had stated Americans suffered from "rootlessness." By the 1980s, there were thousands of federally designated historic districts. Some states, such as Arizona, have passed referendums defending property rights that have stopped private property from being designated as historic without the property owner's consent or compensation for the historic overlay.

== Property types ==
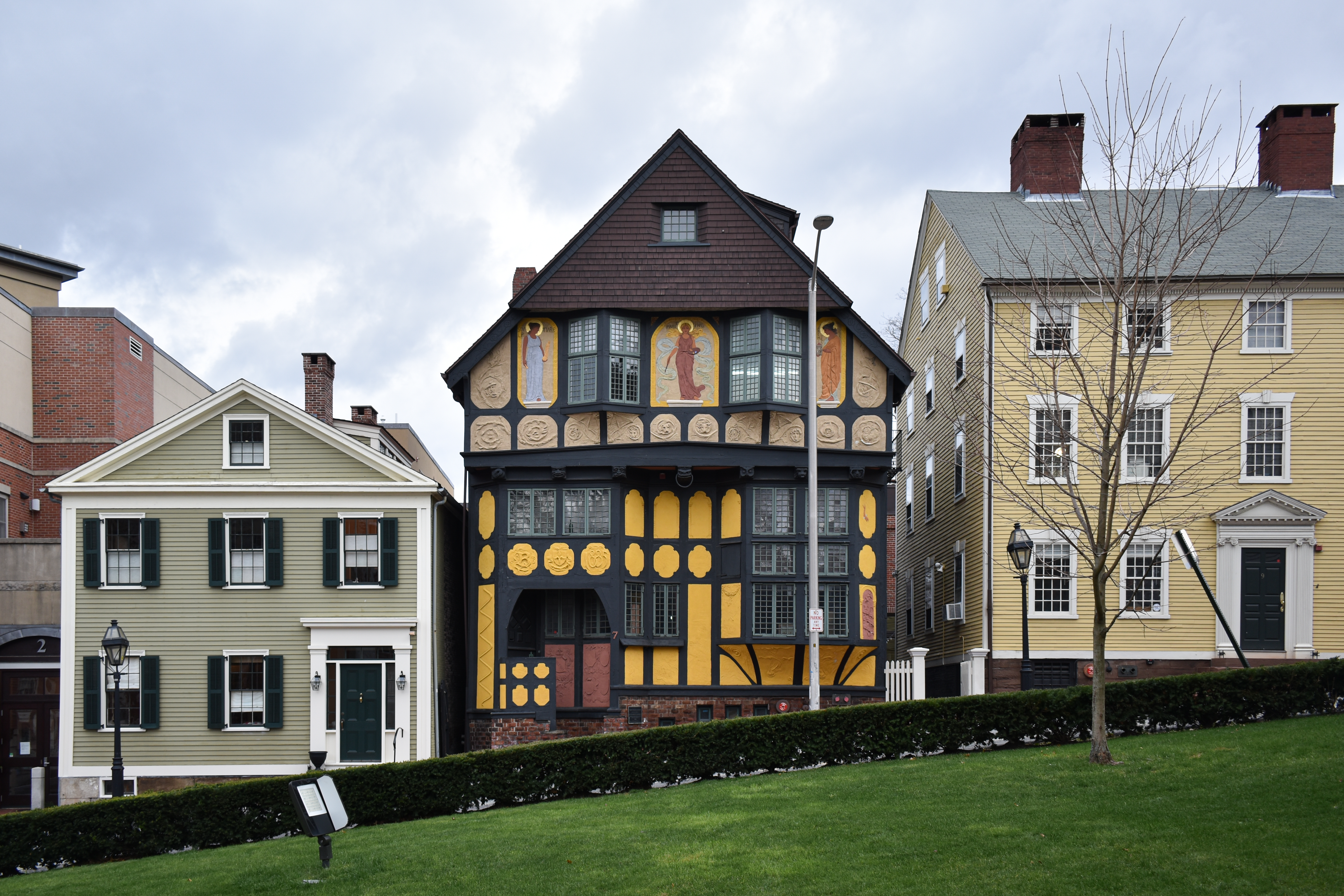
The Fleur-de-lys Studios is a contributing property to Providence's College Hill Historic District

Historic districts are generally two types of properties, contributing and non-contributing. Broadly defined, a contributing property is any property, structure, or object which adds to the historical integrity or architectural qualities that make a historic district, listed locally or federally, significant. Different entities, usually governmental, at both the state and national level in the United States, have differing definitions of contributing property, but they all retain the same basic characteristics. In general, contributing properties are integral parts of a historic district's historical context and character.

In addition to the two types of classification within historic districts, properties listed on the National Register of Historic Places are classified into five broad categories. They are: building, structure, site, district, and object; each one has a specific definition in relation to the National Register. All but the eponymous district category are also applied to historic districts listed on the National Register.

== Federal-level ==
A listing on the National Register of Historic Places is a governmental acknowledgment of a historic district. However, the Register is "an honorary status with some federal financial incentives." The National Register of Historic Places defines a historic district per U.S. federal law, last revised in 2004. According to the Register definition, a historic district is:

a geographically definable area, urban or rural, possessing a significant concentration, linkage, or continuity of sites, buildings, structures, or objects united by past events or aesthetically by plan or physical development. A district may also comprise individual elements separated geographically but linked by association or history.

In 2021, a proposal to create a historic district in Downtown El Paso was denied after a majority of property owners opposed the designation.

Districts established under U.S. federal guidelines generally begin the designation process through a nomination to the National Register of Historic Places. The National Register is the official recognition by the U.S. government of cultural resources worthy of preservation. While designation through the National Register does offer a district or property some protections, it is only in cases where the threatening action involves the federal government. If the federal government is not involved, then the listing on the National Register provides the site, property or district no protections. For example, if company A wants to tear down the hypothetical Smith House and company A is under contract with the state government of Illinois, then the federal designation would offer no protections. If, however, company A was under federal contract, the Smith House would be protected. A federal designation is little more than recognition by the government that the resource is worthy of preservation.

Generally, the criteria for acceptance to the National Register are applied consistently, but there are considerations for exceptions to the criteria, and historic districts influence some of those exceptions. Usually, the National Register does not list religious structures, moved structures, reconstructed structures, or properties that have achieved significance within the last 50 years. However, if a property falls into one of those categories and are "integral parts of districts that do meet the criteria", then an exception allowing their listing will be made. Historic district listings, like all National Register nominations, can be rejected based on owner disapproval. In the case of historic districts, a majority of owners must object to nullify a nomination to the National Register of Historic Places. If such an objection occurred, then the nomination would become a determination of National Register eligibility only. This provision is controversial because of the presumption that owners who do not file a formal objection support the designation, placing the burden on opponents.

== State-level ==
Most U.S. state governments have a listing similar to the National Register of Historic Places. State listings can have similar benefits to a federal designation, such as granting qualifications and tax incentives. In addition, the property can become protected under specific state laws. The laws can be similar or different from the federal guidelines that govern the National Register. A state listing of a historic district on a "State Register of Historic Places", usually by the State Historic Preservation Office, can be an "honorary status", much like the National Register. For example, in Nevada, listing in the State Register places no limits on property owners. In contrast, state law in Tennessee requires that property owners within historic districts follow a strict set of guidelines from the U.S. Department of Interior when altering their properties. Though, according to the National Historic Preservation Act of 1966, all states must have a State Historic Preservation Office, not all states must have a "state historic district" designation. As of 2004, for example, the state of North Carolina had no such designation.

== Local-level ==
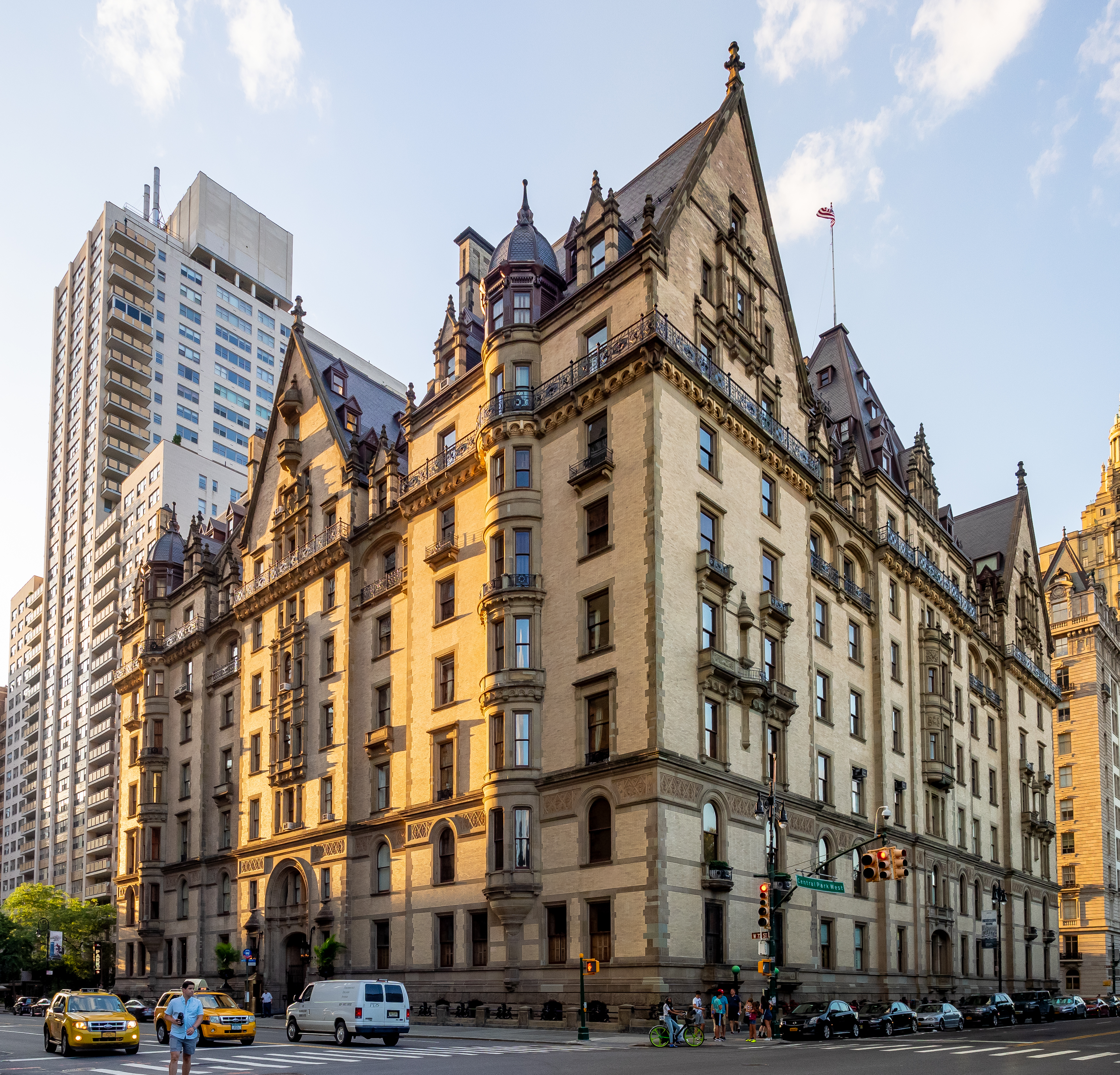
The Dakota belongs to the Central Park West Historic District (a federally designated district) as well as the Upper West Side/Central Park West Historic District (a locally designated district).

Local historic districts usually enjoy the greatest level of protection legally from any threats that may compromise their historic integrity because many land-use decisions are made at the local level. There are more than 2,300 local historic districts in the United States. Local historic districts can be administered at the county or the municipal level; both entities are involved in land use decisions. The specific legal mechanism by which historic districts are enacted and regulated varies from one state to the next. In some areas, they are a component of zoning (where they are sometimes referred to as "overlay districts." In other places, they are created under a separate process unrelated to zoning.

Local historic districts are identified by surveying historic resources and delineating appropriate boundaries that comply with all aspects of due process. Depending on local ordinances or state law, property owners' permission may be required; however, all owners are to be notified and allowed to share their opinions. Most local historic districts are constricted by design guidelines that control changes to the properties included in the district. Many local commissions adopt specific guidelines for each neighborhood's "tout ensemble" although some smaller commissions rely on the Secretary of Interior Standards. For most minor changes, homeowners can consult with local preservation staff at the municipal office and receive guidance and permission. Significant changes, however, require homeowners to apply for a Certificate of Appropriateness (COA), and the historic commission or architectural review board may decide upon the changes. The COA process is carried out with all aspects of due process, with formal notification, hearings, and fair and informed decision-making.

According to the National Park Service, historic districts are one of the oldest forms of protection for historic properties. The city of Charleston, South Carolina is credited with beginning the modern-day historic districts movement. In 1931, Charleston enacted an ordinance which designated an "Old and Historic District" administered by a Board of Architectural Review. Charleston's early ordinance reflected the strong protection that local historic districts often enjoy under local law. It asserted that no alteration could be made to any architectural features the public could view from the street. Local historic districts, as in New Orleans and Savannah, Georgia, predate the Register by ten years or more as well.

Local historic districts are most likely to generate resistance because of the restrictions they tend to place on property owners. Local laws can cause residents "to comply with (local historic district) ordinances." For example, homeowners may be prevented from upgrading poorly insulated windows unless they spend tens of thousands of dollars on identical styles.

Criticism of historic districts in Chicago and elsewhere in the United States is primarily based on arguments that such laws creating such districts restrict the supply of affordable housing, and thus the result of such districts is that of enforcing caste structures and class divisions by region and segments of urban areas. Several historic districts have been proposed not for a true preservation purpose but to prevent development.

The issue of local historic districts and the impact on property values concerns many homeowners. The effects have been extensively studied using multiple methodologies, including before-and-after analysis and evaluating comparable neighborhoods with and without local designation status. Independent researchers have conducted factual analysis in several states, including New Jersey, Texas, Indiana, Georgia, Colorado, Maryland, North and South Carolina, Kentucky, Virginia, and elsewhere. As stated by economist Donovan Rypkema, "the results of these studies are remarkably consistent: property values in local historic districts appreciate significantly faster than the market as a whole in the vast majority of cases and appreciate at rates equivalent to the market in the worst case. Simply put – historic districts enhance property values." In a 2011 study Connecticut Local Historic Districts and Property Values, it was found that "property values in every local historic district saw average increases in value ranging from 4% to over 19% per year." Similarly, in New York City between 1980 and 2000, local historic district properties on a price per square foot basis increased in value significantly more than non-designated properties.

== Significance ==
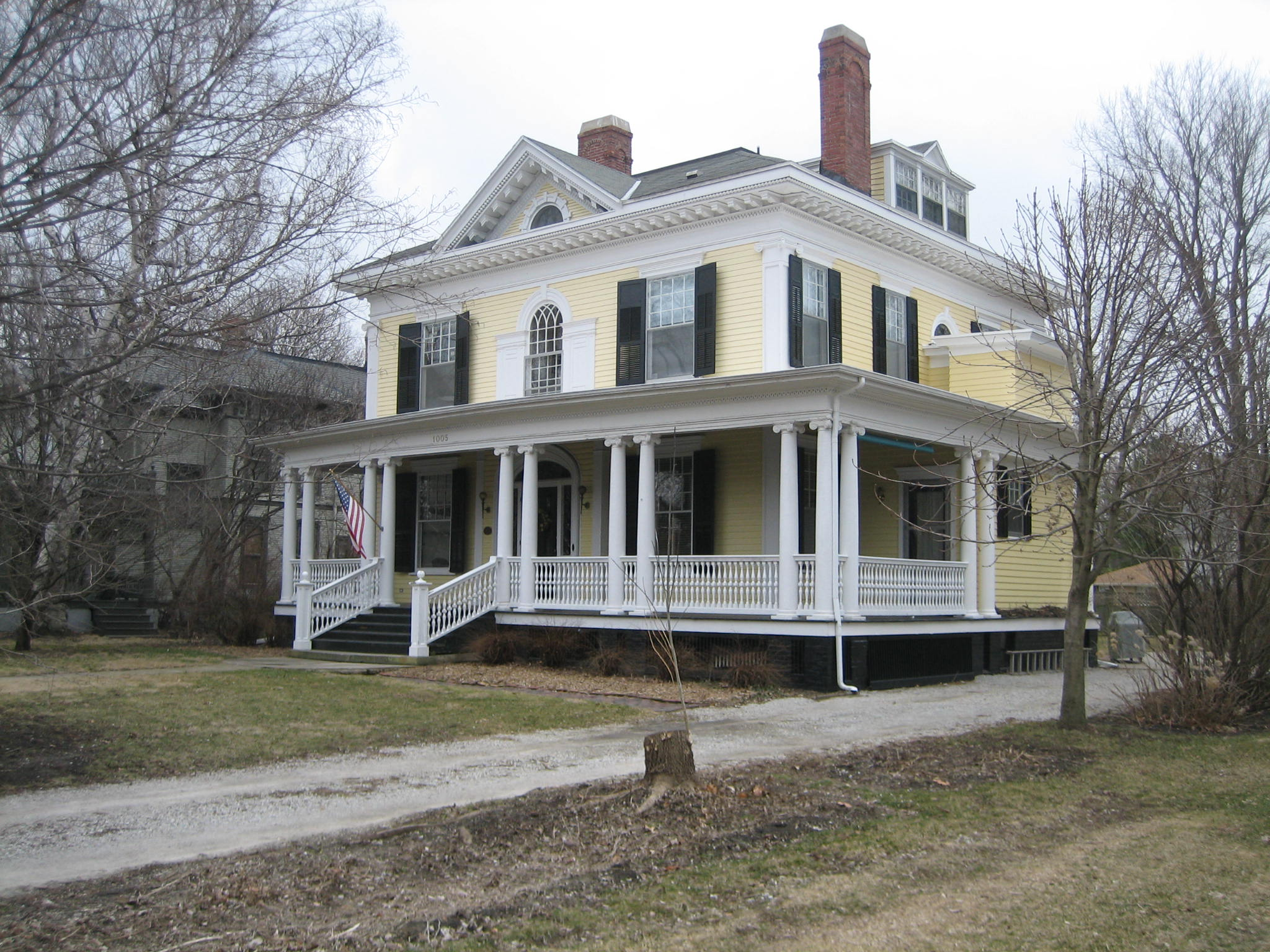
The David Davis III & IV House in Bloomington, Illinois, is an example of a property in a local historic district that is also listed on the federal National Register of Historic Places.

The original concept of an American historic district was a protective area surrounding more important, individual historic sites. As the field of historic preservation progressed, those involved came to realize that the structures acting as "buffer zones" were key elements of the historical integrity of larger landmark sites. Preservationists believed that districts should be more encompassing, blending a mesh of structures, streets, open space, and landscaping to define a historic district's character.

As early as 1981, the National Trust for Historic Preservation identified 882 American cities and towns that had some form of "historic district zoning" in place—local laws meant specifically to protect historic districts. Before 1966, historic preservation in the United States was in its infancy. That year the U.S. Conference of Mayors penned an influential report which concluded, in part, that Americans suffered from a sense of "rootlessness." They recommended historic preservation to help give Americans a sense of orientation. The creation of the National Register of Historic Places in 1966, on the heels of the report, helped instill that sense of orientation the mayors sought. The mayors also recommended that any historic preservation program not focus solely on individual properties but also on "areas and districts which contain special meaning for the community." Local, state, and federal historic districts now account for thousands of historical property listings at all levels of government.

== See also ==
- Adaptive reuse
- Historic district
- Protected area
