= Sarah Woodruff Walker =

- Born: September 4, 1814; Lenox, Massachusetts
- Died: November 9, 1879 (aged 65); Stockbridge, Massachusetts
- Education: Hartford Female Seminary
- Spouse: David Davis (m. 1838)
- Children: 2

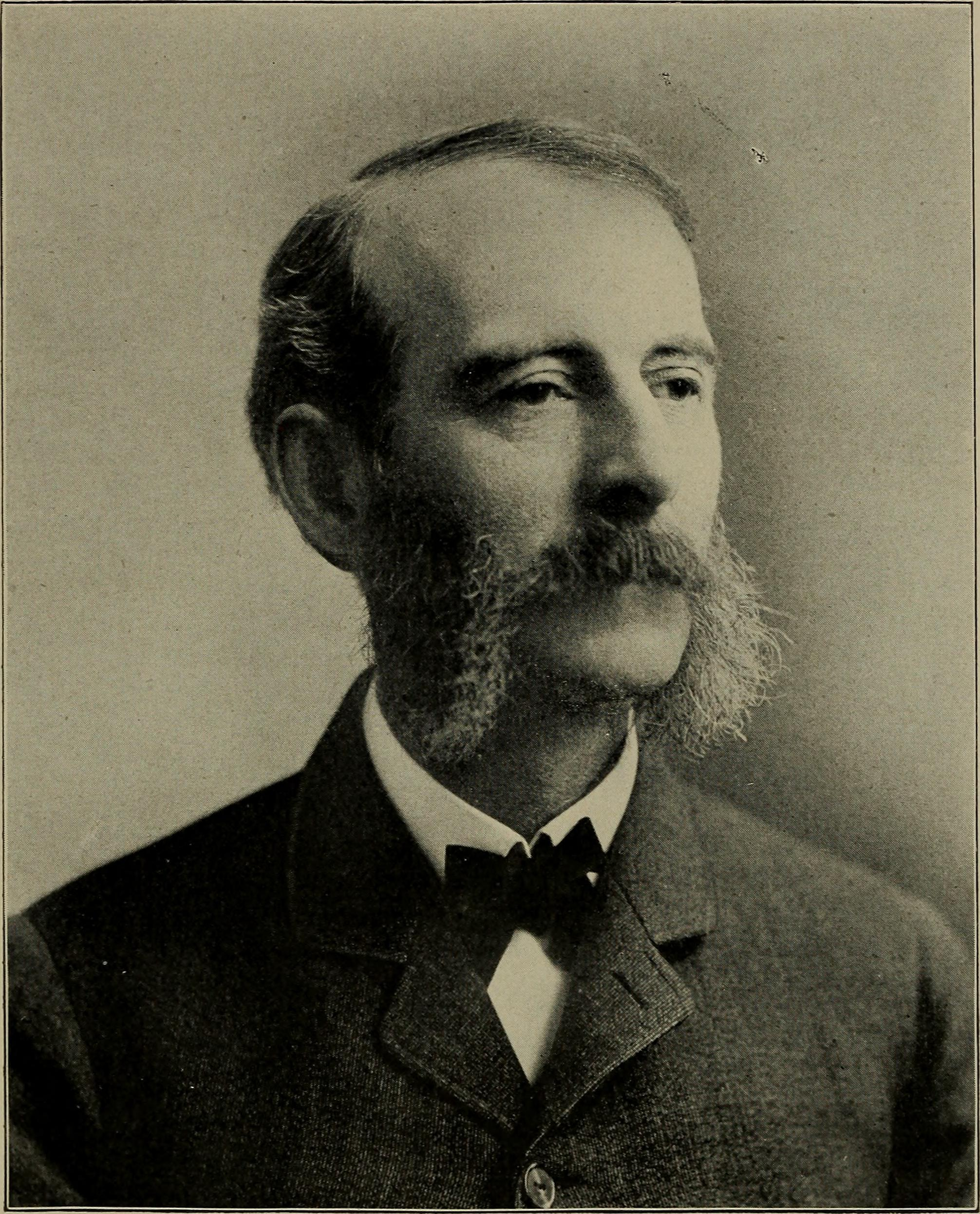
George Perrin Davis (son)

Sarah Woodruff Walker Davis (September 4, 1814 – November 9, 1879) was the wife of American politician and judge David Davis.

== Biography ==
Davis was born in Lenox, Massachusetts to William Perrin Walker and Lucy Adam Walker. She was a fairly educated woman for her time, attending Hartford Female Seminary in Connecticut, where she studied under the tutelage of Catharine Beecher and Harriet Beecher Stowe. While she dropped out of school and returned to her hometown, Davis remained an intellectual woman for her entire life.

Back in Lenox, she met David Davis, a young lawyer who was practicing in Bloomington, Illinois. They married in 1838 and had a long and loving marriage, evidenced by the many letters they sent each other while Judge Davis was working in Washington, DC and she was at home in Bloomington. They built their dream home, Clover Lawn, now known as the David Davis Mansion, in Bloomington from 1870–1872. Two of their children, George Perrin (born in 1842) and Sarah "Sallie", lived to adulthood.

Davis was renowned in her community for her generosity and willingness to help those in need. She employed a domestic staff of mostly young Irish immigrants and thought of them as a sort of family when her children were grown and her husband was away. She was politically informed, seeing that Abraham Lincoln was a close friend of the Davis family and her husband served as his campaign manager and a Supreme Court justice. Still, despite her knowledge, Davis preferred not to get involved in what she saw as the affairs of men. She was fairly independent, since the judge was often away in Washington, and raised hogs as her own means of income and also traveled extensively. It was on one of these trips, to visit her sister's home in Stockbridge, Massachusetts, that Davis died at the age of 65. A funeral took place in Stockbridge before her body was returned to Bloomington, where a second funeral took place at the mansion. There were estimated to be 1,500 mourners in attendance, including such figures as Adlai Stevenson I and Robert Todd Lincoln.
