= David Davis III & IV House =

Historic house in Illinois, United States

- U.S. National Register of Historic Places
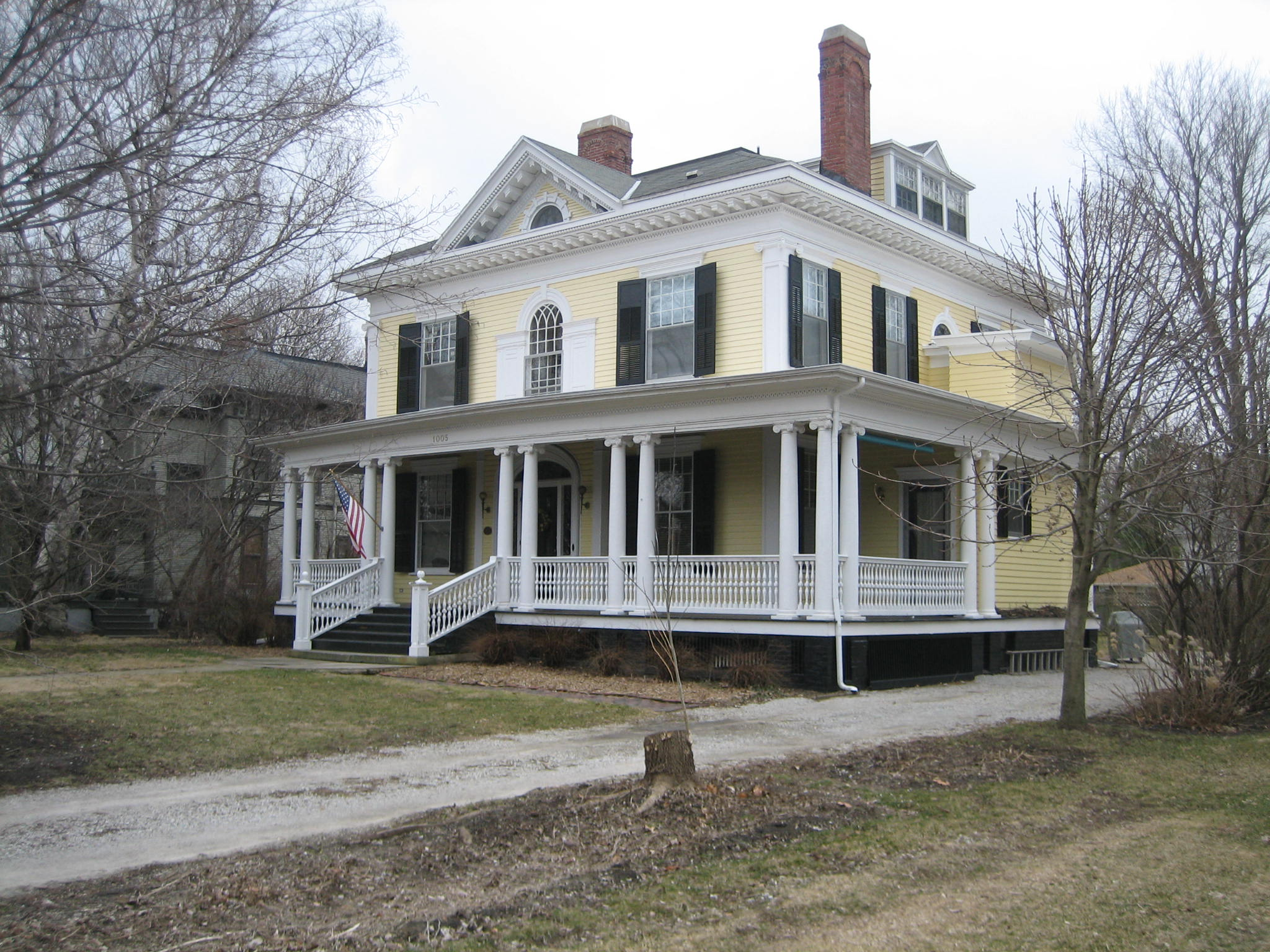

- Location within Illinois Location within the United States
- Interactive map showing the location for David Davis II and IV House
- Location: 1005 E. Jefferson, Bloomington, Illinois
- Coordinates: 40°28′50″N 88°58′48″W
- Area: less than one acre
- Built: 1898
- Architect: George Harvey (1898 remodel)
- Architectural style: Colonial Revival
- NRHP reference No.: 82000400
- Added to NRHP: November 12, 1982

The David Davis III & IV House is a site on the National Register of Historic Places located in the county seat of McLean County, Illinois, Bloomington. The home was added to the register in 1982 due to its affiliation with the descendants of 19th century U.S. Supreme Court justice and Bloomington native David Davis, namely Illinois state senator David Davis IV. The house is not only listed on the National Register but it is also a contributing property to the local Davis-Jefferson Historic District.
