= Hartford Female Seminary =

Female seminary in Hartford, Connecticut

Coordinates: 41.7677°N 72.6751°W

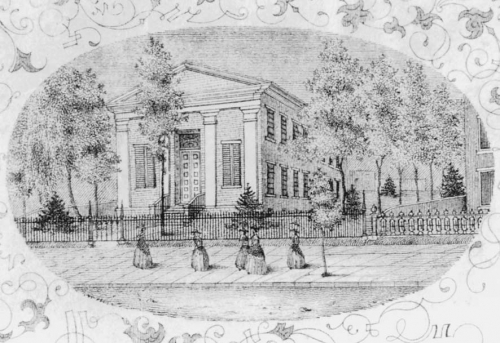
- Hartford Female Seminary, from an 1896 diploma
- Type: Female seminary
- Established: May 20, 1823; 203 years ago
- President: Catharine Beecher
- Location: Hartford, Connecticut, Connecticut, US

Hartford Female Seminary was a female seminary in Hartford, Connecticut, United States. Established in 1823, by Catharine Beecher, it became one of the first major educational institutions for women in the United States. By 1826 it had enrolled nearly 100 students. It implemented then-radical programs such as physical education courses for women. Beecher sought the aid of Mary Lyon in the development of the seminary. The Hartford Female Seminary closed towards the later half of the 19th century.

The school was first hosted in a third-floor room in a building at Main and Kinsley Streets in Hartford, then in the basement of the North Church. In 1827 the school moved into a new neoclassical building at 100 Pratt Street.

Harriet Beecher Stowe taught at the school beginning in November 1827.

== Notable people ==
Alumni

- Rose Terry Cooke
- Fanny Fern
- Annie Trumbull Slosson
- Virginia Thrall Smith
- Harriet Beecher Stowe
- Mary E. Van Lennep
- Sarah Woodruff Walker

Teachers

- Kate Foote Coe

== See also ==
- Female seminaries
- Women in education in the United States
