= Rose Terry Cooke =

American poet (1827–1892)

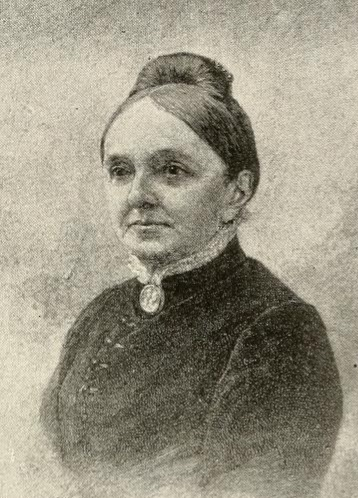
- Born: Rose Terry; February 17, 1827; West Hartford, Connecticut, U.S.
- Died: July 18, 1892 (aged 65); Pittsfield, Massachusetts, U.S.
- Education: Hartford Female Seminary
- Occupations: author, poet
- Spouse: Rollin S. Cooke (m. 1873)
- Relatives: Nathaniel Terry, Henry Wadsworth Longfellow, William Wadsworth, Alfred Terry
- Writing career
- Language: English

Rose Terry Cooke (February 17, 1827–July 18, 1892) was an American author and poet. Some of her earliest contributions were published in Putnam's Magazine; and the Atlantic Monthly, in which she wrote the leading story in the first number; then in the Galaxy, published in Philadelphia; and in Harper's. A very popular story by Cooke was "The Deacon's Week". Her short stories of New England life would fill several volumes. Cooke's dream was that of developing her powers of poetry. Her first verses were printed in the New York Tribune, using her mother's initials for a pseudonym.

== Early life and education ==
Rose Terry was born in a farm house on February 17, 1827, in West Hartford, Connecticut. Her mother was Anne Wright Hurlbut, the daughter of John Hurlbut of Wethersfield, Connecticut, the first New England shipmaster who sailed round the world. He left his daughter an orphan when she was nine years old; and she grew up with a morbid conscience. She married Henry Wadsworth Terry, the son of Nathaniel Terry, president of a Hartford Bank, and for some time a United States representative from Connecticut. Henry Wadsworth Terry was a social favorite, sensitive, generous, and open-hearted. On his mother's side, he belonged to the old Wadsworth stock, from which the poet Henry Wadsworth Longfellow descended, his immediate ancestor in this country having been the Hon. William Wadsworth; and his uncle, several times removed, having been that Joseph Wadsworth who stole the Charter Oak, and who had a descendant, General Alfred Terry of Fort Fisher and Pulaski notability, the cousin of Rose. There was one younger sister.

Her father educated her in outdoor studies, familiarizing her with birds, bees, and flowers. The mother taught Cooke to read before she was three years old, and at age six, she was studying Walker's Rhyming Dictionary, columns of which had to be learned with their definitions, and compositions written including the words learned. With such an exacting mother, Cooke kept a diary from the age of six to ten, which was preserved at least through adulthood. The dictionary process produced such sentences as: "To-day I imbued my fingers with the blood of cherries!" Cooke was a delicate child, owing to an early illness, which was so severe that for a time, it was thought she would die. It was possibly for that reason that she was encouraged to spend time outdoors. She was an exceedingly sensitive child, too, and her imagination was by no means dwarfed by the servants who told her ghost stories, the most noted of these servants being Athanasius, a Greek boy who escaped from the Turkish massacre.

After her father lost his property in the Morus Multicaulis Speculation, the family moved to Hartford, taking up their residence in a large brick mansion built in 1799 by Colonel Jeremiah Wadsworth for his daughter, who had married Nathaniel Terry. When Cooke was about ten, she was sent to the Hartford Female Seminary where she asked to be admitted to a special class considered far beyond her grade level, being instruction in literature and composition given by the principal, John P. Brace. Brace had been an instructor in the school where Cooke's mother received her education. While at the Hartford Female Seminary, "For her own entertainment [Cooke] wrote poems and dramas for her friends". She graduated in 1843, at the age sixteen.

In that same year, she joined the Congregational Church. Both parents raised Cooke in the severest puritanical habits and absolutely restricted her from the company of young men. But that did not prevent the feelings of youth, suppressed in real life, from overflowing into printed verse.

== Career ==
Immediately after graduation, Cooke began to teach in Hartford although she did not remain there for long. She then took a position in a Presbyterian church school in Burlington, New Jersey. In the fourth year there, she became a governess in the family of the clergyman, William Van Rensselaer. After a while, feeling the need there was of her at home, she returned to Hartford and began her literary life.

Terry's first published poem appeared in the New York Daily Tribune in 1851 and received high praise from the editor Charles A. Dana. In 1855, she published "The Mormon's Wife" in Graham's Magazine, about which Elizabeth Stuart Phelps Ward wrote that it "dealt powerfully with the leprosy of Mormonism, and wrung from the heart tears dried only by the heat of indignation," and interpreted the story as early evidence of Cooke's "intuitions of genius... a genius [which] became the ultimate expression of generations of hard Puritan ancestry." This was followed by a piece for the Atlantic Monthly, the leading story in the first number. Around 1858, when Rose was about twenty-nine her idolized sister Alice, younger than herself by nearly five years, married; and in the delicate state of this sister's health her two children became the care and delight of Cooke. In 1860, she published a volume of poems, and in 1888, she published more verse with her Complete Poems.

Among those who admired the short stories of Miss Rose Terry was a young banker named Rollin S. Cooke, who lived in Winsted, Connecticut. His recreation was in the reading of them, and he looked forward to a new story from Miss Terry with intense delight. He became cashier of the local bank at the place where Miss Terry lived so that he was enabled not only to admire her stories, but to admire her in person as well. She was considerably older than Rollin, a widower 16 years her junior, but that seemed the more to fascinate Rollin. Those living in Winsted saw the gentleness, chivalry, and admiration which characterized his courtship manner and gallantry. The literary reputation of his wife give him satisfaction more than the making of money, and he would take greater pleasure in hearing her praises sounded than she would herself. She was forty-three when she met Rollin in 1872 at Winsted, and married him April 16, 1873. At some point, he was an iron manufacturer of Litchfield County, Connecticut. They made their home in Winsted and in Pittsfield, Massachusetts.

It was after her marriage that she became best known for her fresh and humorous stories. Her chief volumes of fiction dealing mainly with New England country life were Happy Dodd: or, She Hath Done What She Could (1878), Somebody's Neighbors (1881), Root-bound and Other Sketches (1885), The Sphinx's Children and Other People's (1886), No: A Story for Boys (1886), Steadfast (1889) and Huckleberries Gathered From the New England Hills (1891). Cooke was a contributor to Putnam's Magazine, Atlantic Monthly, Galaxy, and Harper's. She considered "The Deacon's Week" one of the best of her short stories. "The Two Villages," her best-known poem, was inspired by the view from the home of her brother-in-law, Howard Collins. Located on Torrington Avenue in the industrial town of Collinsville, the home overlooked both the Collins Company axe factory (where the "fires" of the poem would "gleam from the smithy's door") and the cemetery on the hillside behind the factory. A plaque on Torrington Avenue marks this spot.

== Personal life ==
=== Imposters ===
There were at least five attempts to impersonate Cooke. The first of these appeared in a Pennsylvania town with a woman who claimed there that she had written everything ever published under Rose Terry's name, that the name was a pen name any way, the name of a little cousin of hers who died young, her uncle, the child's father, allowing her to use it. This person aroused a wild religious excitement among the young people of the place, fell into hysteric trances on hearing sacred music, and made herself generally adored and followed. As irritating as this was, she further stated that she had received US$80,000 from these writings of hers, and had used it all in educating poor girls. After a time, Harriet Beecher Stowe received a note from the lady with whom this pretender boarded, which ran, —"dear Madam,—I call upon you to silence the base reports spread about here concerning a lovely Christian woman at present staying with me. A line from you, stating that she is the author of the works written under the signature of Rose Terry will stop the rumors at once, and much oblige yours truly." Stowe immediately responded that she had known Rose Terry from her birth, and that she was then, and had been for many years, living in Hartford, and the other person was an impostor. Years afterward, this deceiver came to Rose Terry's home town, established herself there as one of the leaders in religious and charitable matters, told someone that she had written much under Rose's name, told someone else that she had US$1,800 a year from the "Atlantic Monthly," and marked several of the best poems in a religious collection as her own, the publisher positively denying her statement when asked about it. This peculiar individual held a trusted position in a city charity, and lived in a wealthy family as a guide, although the truth was told to her clientele, who persisted in regarding her as a persecuted saint.

The next impersonation was made by a lady on a railroad train, who made acquaintance with the sister of a friend of Rose's, the sister never happening to have seen Rose. She informed her that she was Rose Terry, that she was going abroad to write a book, and various other items of her literary affairs, of which Rose herself was never in the habit of speaking to casual acquaintances, having an old-fashioned predilection for modesty. Number three of these replicas simply offered her services in a New York Sunday school, and having registered this name of her fancy, never appeared. Number four, however, very soon replaced her, making her avatar at a hotel in New York and confiding the fact of the authorship of certain sentimental, romantic, and humorous stories and verses to a Southern lady who then betrayed her. As for number five, it was at a meeting of an acquaintance of Rose's in the cars on the way from Hartford. She inquired if she lived there, and then if she knew Rose, and then proceeded to give quite a circumstantial account of her own intimacy with the object of her remark. On reaching New York, she left the train at the upper station, having also stolen the pocketbook of Rose's Hartford acquaintance.

== Death ==
She died at Pittsfield on July 18, 1892.

== Style and themes ==
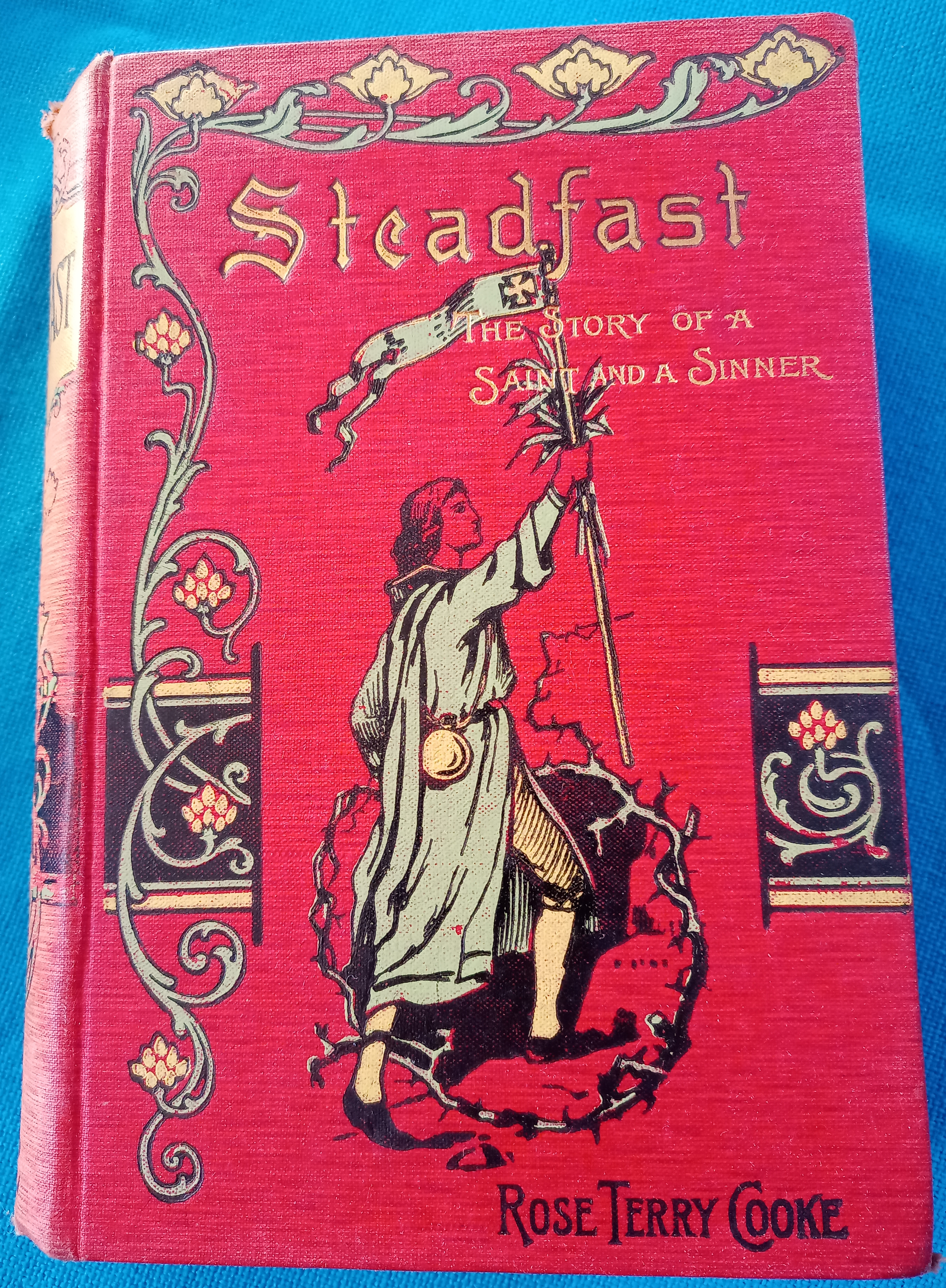
Steadfast by (UK) Sunday School Union

Cooke wrote subtle metaphysical reveries as "My Tenants," and " Did I?" as well as bits of poetic romance, and a succession of stories of New England life. She was particularly happy in her delineations of rustic New England life. One of these tales, entitled "Mrs. Flint's Married Experience," setting forth the "closeness" of the average farmer nature, was severely criticised as overdone, but its correctness was proven by recourse to certain records in town and church books, which exhibited just such a state of facts existing in the life history of certain people in the town of Torringford, Connecticut.

The verses "Samson Agonistes," "Fremont's Ride," and "After the Camanches," demonstrate the writer's patriotism, politics, and lively interest in the questions of the day. Her religious feeling is found in the "Bell Songs" and in "Prayer"; and her sympathy with the human heart is noted in "At Last," and in "The Two Villages". There is a tremendous vigor and vivid picturesqueness in her poems of "Semele" and "The Suttee," which contain weird phases of passion. "In The Hospital," "Done For," and "Lost on the Prairie," were the pioneers of the Border ballad.

Many of Cooke's works addressed the oppressive system of marriage for women in the nineteenth century, in particular, the ways the women lost their independence, money, and happiness through bad marriages. Her story "The Ring Fetter" describes the harrowing story of a woman who marries a counterfeiter and drunkard, and cannot escape his violence. "How Cecilia Changed Her Mind" also tells the story of an "old maid" who marries a deacon, only to resent his controlling and demanding ways. Cooke's details notably pay attention to the paperwork of marriage, noting how women lost their wealth and could be left penniless or helpless at the hands of uncaring husbands.

== Selected works ==
- An Easter voice
- Miss Lucinda
- The betraying hand, 1860?
- What women should be thankful for : manuscript, [not before 1865].
- My Christmas gift : what shall I render unto the Lord?, 187?
- Happy Dodd, or, "She hath done what she could", 1878
- A lay preacher, 1884
- The two villages, 1885
- No! & where to say it : a temperance story, 1887
- The old garden, 1888
- Steadfast : the story of a saint and sinner., 1889
- A fairy at school, 1893
- Little foxes, 1904
- The deacon's week, 1912
