= Mary E. Van Lennep =

American missionary

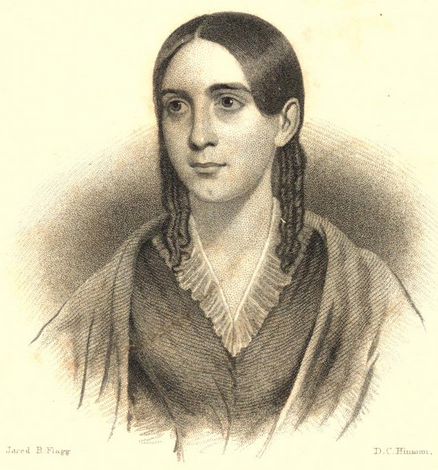
- Born: Mary Elizabeth Hawes; April 16, 1821; Hartford, Connecticut, U.S.
- Died: September 27, 1844 (aged 23); Constantinople, Ottoman Empire (modern-day Istanbul, Turkey)
- Resting place: Feriköy Protestant Cemetery, Şişli, Turkey
- Education: Hartford Female Seminary; Yale College
- Occupations: missionary; school founder; memoirist
- Spouse: Henry John Van Lennep (m. 1843)
- Writing career
- Language: English
- Notable works: Memoir of Mrs. Mary E. Van Lennep : only daughter of the Rev. Joel Hawes, D.D. and wife of the Rev. Henry J. Van Lennep, Missionary in Turkey

Mary Elizabeth Van Lennep (née, Hawes; April 16, 1821 – September 27, 1844) was an American missionary, school founder, and memoirist. Accompanying her husband to Asia Minor, she established a school for Armenian girls in Constantinople, Turkey. Her religious writings were contained in a journal which she commenced in January 1841 and closed in June 1843, just before leaving home; the unpublished manuscript was found after her death. Other journals followed at various times in Van Lennep's life. Her mother published Memoir of Mrs. Mary E. Van Lennep : only daughter of the Rev. Joel Hawes, D.D. and wife of the Rev. Henry J. Van Lennep, Missionary in Turkey posthumously in 1847.

== Early life and education ==
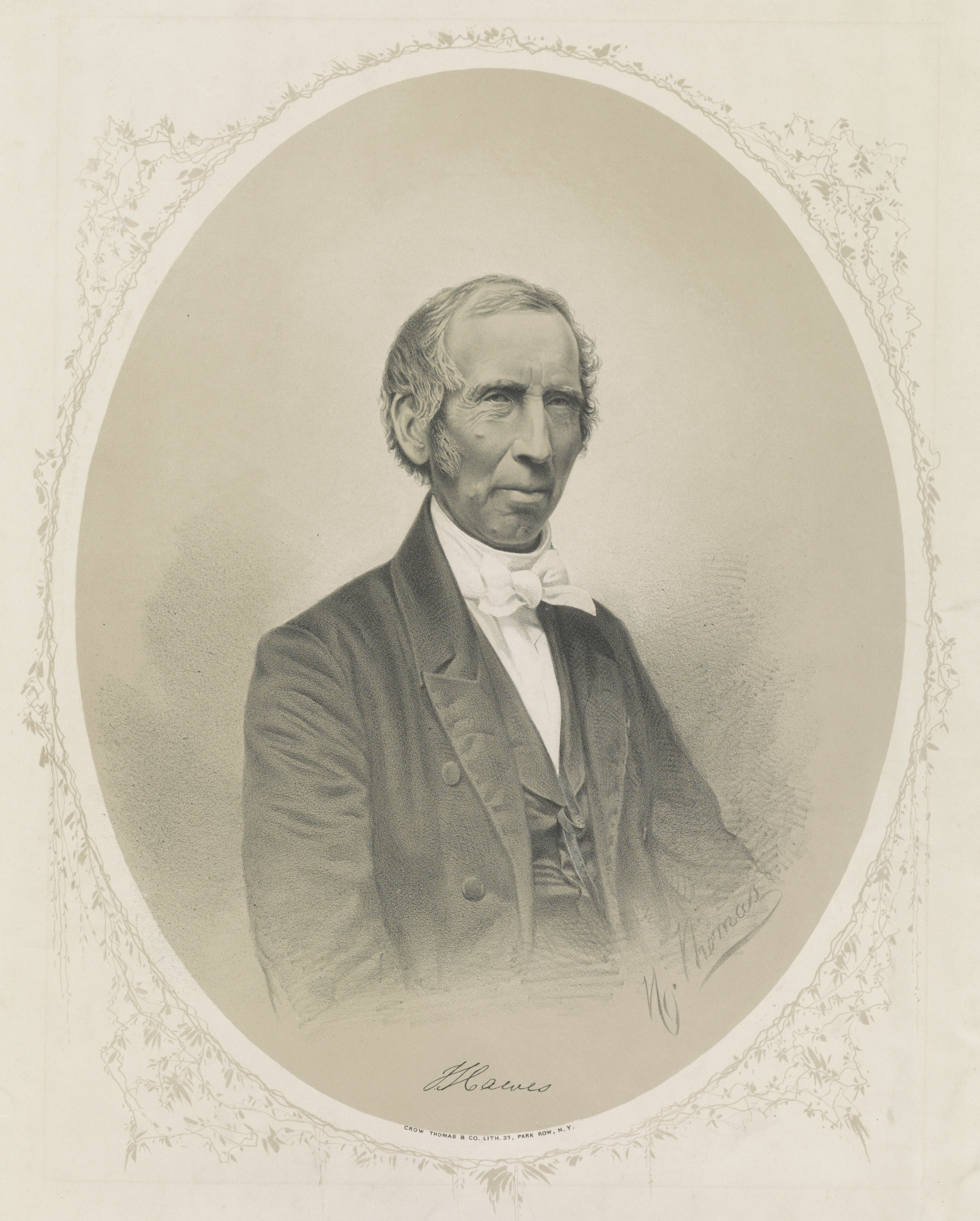
Rev. Joel Hawes, D.D.

Mary Elizabeth Hawes was born in Hartford, Connecticut, April 16, 1821. She was the only daughter of the Rev. Joel Hawes, D.D., pastor of the First Congregational Church in Hartford, and Louisa Fisher Hawes. Her childhood was spent mostly in Hartford, where she enjoyed a socially-advantaged life. When she was ten, Van Lennep's younger brother died.

Early in life, she became familiar with the Bible, which she preferred reading instead of more trivial books. At the age of twelve, Van Lennep professed religion, which she described by the expression, "I have found God." Van Lennep was well-educated. She entered the Hartford Female Seminary of Catharine Beecher at age twelve, and graduated in August 1838. In October 1838, Van Lennep's father took her to the family of Dr. and Mrs. Fitch in New Haven, Connecticut where she joined a sewing circle and read the New Testament in French. Here, she also read Shakespeare, some of Milton's short poems, John Marshall's The Life of George Washington, and Jared Sparks. She attended lectures at Yale College, including the chemistry laboratory, philosophy, a course on ancient history, as well as some shorter courses, on other subjects. Besides this, the company with which she mingled in her father's house included ministers and missionaries, and she learned from them, too.

Several things contributed to exclude her somewhat from general society. Among these, the principal was the lateness of the hour when parties broke up. Her father was an advocate for seasonable hours, and was exceedingly annoyed by any irregularities either in rising or retiring, which broke in upon family order, or interrupted the regular studies and duties of the day. The habits of society, in this respect, were at variance with his principles. If she attended parties, therefore, she must do so at the expense of incommoding her father. If she retired from them altogether, she had to do so at the risk of losing her friends. For a time, this was a dilemma that caused some real suffering. She knew her father did not want to exclude her from society; on the contrary, that he chose to have her mingle freely with her young friends, and participate with them in all the appropriate enjoyments of social engagements. But she quickly found the impracticability of doing this, and at the same time of accommodating herself to his hours. She therefore made up her mind to retire from late social circles altogether. As a consequence of doing so, she was dropped from the acquaintance and attention of some, and those who sought interactions with her, were those who truly valued her friendship.

Impressed with the importance of missions, she formed a society among her young friends to sew and knit for the purpose of providing clothing for the families who were abroad. For this circle, which convened from time to time, the society prepared a box which was sent to Dr. Peter Parker, a medical missionary in China. She regularly attended the missionary concert, read the Missionary Herald, and provided a financial contribution. She also worked at the Sunday school.

There were two circumstances which had powerful influence upon her religious life, and which, to some extent, seemed to have given a direction to her later years. The first was a season of sickness by which Van Lennep almost died, which began in August 1841, and continued through the summer, which gave her time for reflection. The second circumstance was the revival which occurred in the church with which she was connected in the same year as her illness, that revival being deep, powerful, all-pervading in her view. She was finally well enough to return to church in November of that year.

In January 1841, she commenced a journal. Her last entry in it was on June 30, 1843. It was a manuscript of about 500 pages, compactly written, in which the principal events of two and a half years of her life were briefly noticed, together with the influence which these had upon her character. She seems to have had two reasons for keeping it. One was, as she has said, that she might have the satisfaction of recalling scenes and events contained in it, when she should "be far away"; and the other, that she might be able to mark with more distinctness, her progress in religious life. They described the tenor of her daily life, and provided her own impressions of herself, her faults and imperfections, as well as her daily routine.

Van Lennep was in the habit of expressing her feelings in poetry. Her correspondents were numerous, but it was only comparatively a few with whom she kept up a constant dialogue whenever she was separated from their company. Although in all her letters there were sufficient indications that she was always under the influence of religious principle, and that she greatly desired her friends might sympathize with her in this, yet there were times when she made a more than ordinary effort to turn their attention to the subject of religion.

== Career ==
In 1843, when Van Lennep was asked to contemplate the missionary field as the scene of her future work, before deciding to enter upon it, she examined her qualifications for the work. The work of missions was, in her estimation, a great work; and the preparation which she deemed necessary for entering upon it was something more than external accomplishments, or piety even. She felt that there must be a love for the work itself; a preference of it to any other work, and a willingness to make personal sacrifices whenever the salvation of souls or the cause of Christ should in any way require it. As noted in her journal, she had a constant sense of her dependence on divine aid in all her efforts to promote the spiritual welfare of others, and this was especially true when contemplating her qualifications for the work of missions. She had from early youth been a devoted, self-denying worker of the church at home, but now that her field was about to be changed, she felt a new and increased sense of dependence upon God for aid. Under a deep conviction of helplessness if left to herself, she resolved to leave things in God's hands. But her preparation was but in part completed when she decided with regard to her qualifications for laboring in a foreign field. She felt another responsibility to be resting upon her and that was to be useful in the United States. But her parents helped her in her decision to become a foreign missionary.

On September 4, 1843, she wed Rev. Henry John Van Lennep (1815-1889). Born in Smyrna, he was a missionary under the patronage of the American Board of Commissioners for Foreign Missions, and was destined to return to Turkey. After the wedding, the couple spent their honeymoon at Niagara Falls, as well as stopping by Rochester, New York for a meeting of the American Board.

Along with her piano and bureau, she sailed from Boston in company with her husband and father, in the barque, Stamboul, on October 11, 1843, with the missionaries well-accommodated on board. Most of the voyage was spent by Van Lennep in preparing herself for the future and in the study of those languages which she would most need. She enjoyed the passage more than any other woman on board. On November 5, they could see the Rock of Gibraltar, and they moored at Malta on November 16. About December 1, they arrived at Smyrna, and spent a month at the home of her mother-in-law. At the end of December, they removed to their new home, which stood near the sea shore and included a garden with fruit trees. They found her husband's former associates who were friendly to them, and soon, their residence in Smyrna became pleasant. Van Lennep took on the cultural habits of the women in Turkey. She dressed in European style, while her mother-in-law dressed in Greek style.

The winter that Van Lennep spent in Smyrna, there was, to some extent, a re-organization of the missions in the East including an important change in the Smyrna mission. Some of its laborers returned home, and some were removed to other fields. Among the latter was Mr. Van Lennep. It was thought that his usefulness would be greatly increased by removing him to a wider sphere of action. This was an unexpected trial to both husband and wife, and particularly to Mrs. Van Lennep. When she devoted herself to the work of missions, it was with the expectation of being located in Smyrna, at least for a considerable time, as that was, and had ever been, the field of her husband's work. All her preparations had been made with reference to that place, and she expected to remain there, until she should become acclimated, and accustomed to Eastern life. She hoped also to have remained in her Smyrna home, as she had for some time regarded it, until she should have qualified herself by a study of the languages, to take her place among the missionaries of the East. Added to all, she had friends there, with whom she had corresponded from her childhood, and for two years, she had looked to it as her future home. It is not surprising, therefore, that it should have been something of a struggle to bring herself to leave the place with cheer. In addition, she was perplexed when at length, a new and very important field was assigned as the scene of their future labors, the main burden of which was to rest upon herself. During all this winter, they were kept in a continual state of agitation and suspense, uncertain where they were to be stationed, and what would be their particular area of activity. In the meantime, they devoted themselves to the languages, and also to what of Christian influence they could exert over the large and interesting field where they were placed. In consequence of this unsettled state of things, they could form no plan of effort which they could pursue for any certain time. As a consequence of this, there was no account of labor that could be placed in the annals of missions.

In this same period, 1843–44, Rufus Anderson, of the American Board, visited Levant-based missionaries and became convinced of the need for a female seminary for the Armenians in Constantinople. In January 1844, while Van Lennep was too ill to leave her bed, she became aware of a proposed plan for their removal to serve in another area, and that they were candidates for Trebizond. Instead, the American Board relocated the Van Lenneps to Constantinople in May of that year where Mr. Van Lennep was to preach and Mrs. Van Lennep was to support the students in a girls' school while a suitable teacher was found.

== Death and legacy ==
Early in August 1844, Van Lennep was afflicted with dysentery, which increased upon her gradually. On September 26, she was diagnosed with typhus fever. She died the next day, in Constantinople. A monument erected by her husband in the Protestant graveyard at Pera overlooks the site of her burial. Henrietta Hamlin, the missionary wife of Cyrus Hamlin, also died in Constantinople and is buried next to Van Lennep.

The Memoir of Mrs. Mary E. Van Lennep : only daughter of the Rev. Joel Hawes, D.D. and wife of the Rev. Henry J. Van Lennep, Missionary in Turkey, was published in 1847, by Van Lennep's mother, Louisa Fisher Hawes. In it, as she never separated religion from the active duties and daily enjoyments of life, so in her private journal she did not disconnect these; and while it contains a faithful record of her religious views and feelings, it gives them in connection with the objects and events by which she was influenced in her dealings with the world around her.
