= Virginia Thrall Smith =

American children's advocate (1836–1903)

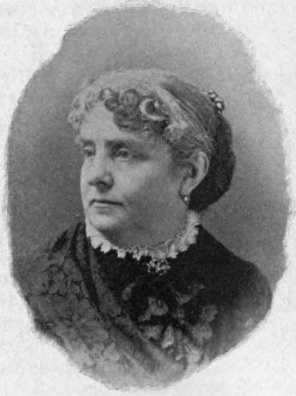
- Born: August 16, 1836; Bloomfield, Connecticut, US
- Died: January 3, 1903 (aged 66); Hartford, Connecticut, US
- Burial place: Cedar Hill Cemetery
- Education: Hartford Female Seminary; Mount Holyoke College
- Occupation: Activist
- Spouse: William B. Smith (m. 1857; died 1897)
- Children: 6

Virginia Thrall Smith (August 16, 1836 – January 3, 1903) was an American children's rights activist, who helped reform Connecticut's child welfare policies and founded the first free kindergarten program in the state.

== Early life ==
The daughter of Melissa Griswold and Hiram Thrall, Smith was born and grew up in Bloomfield, Connecticut. She was educated at Suffield Institute, Hartford Female Seminary, and Mount Holyoke College. In 1857, 21 year old Virginia Thrall married William B. Smith (1832-1897) and the couple moved to Hartford, Connecticut. Between 1859 and 1874, the couple had six children, three of whom died in infancy from diphtheria. Their son, Winchell Smith became a well-known playwright.

== Charitable work ==
During the early years of her marriage, Smith became involved in local charities and wrote short fiction for newspapers. In 1876, Smith was appointed administrator of the Hartford City Mission, a Congregationalist charity which served the poor. Smith expanded the services offered by the Hartford City Mission, giving it many of the programs included in a settlement house. Smith's work focused on empowering the poor and one of her first acts as administrator was to create a loan fund so that "self-respecting persons might obtain small sums to meet their most pressing wants." Smith also created skill building classes like the Women's Sewing Class and Reading Society.

In 1881, Smith opened a free kindergarten at the Hartford City Mission. This was the first free kindergarten in Connecticut. In 1885, Smith pushed the Connecticut State Legislature to authorize kindergartens in public schools throughout the state. The bill passed unanimously.

Smith was invited to speak at the 1893 World Congress of Representative Women at the Chicago World's Fair. More than 150,000 people attended the lectures and Smith's speech was included in a special booklet by the Congress of Women. By the standards of the day, Smith's call for national public kindergartens and fresh air funds was revolutionary. As she said, "Every community stands under a moral obligation to give to every helpless child born within its border the best possible chance to grow into honesty and virtue."

In 1882, Smith was appointed to the State Board of Charities. She visited poorhouses and estimated that 2,500 children were housed in these low quality and often dangerous facilities. Thanks to Smith's advocacy, a new law was passed in May 1883 establishing temporary children's homes. These homes were only available to children deemed physically and mentally healthy which was only a partly victory in Smith's opinion.

Meanwhile, Smith's work helping unwed mothers began to trouble some and she was accused of baby farming. The accusations were never proven, but Smith was forced to resign from the Hartford City Mission in 1882.

Smith organized the Connecticut Children's Aid Society in 1892. She set up a homes for sick and abandoned children in Wethersfield and Newington. The Newington facility grew into the Connecticut Children's Medical Center. Meanwhile, the Connecticut Children's Aid Society has grown into The Village for Families & Children.

== Death ==
Virginia Thrall Smith died in Hartford in 1903 and she is buried in Cedar Hill Cemetery.
