= David Davis (Supreme Court justice) =

US Supreme Court justice from 1862 to 1877

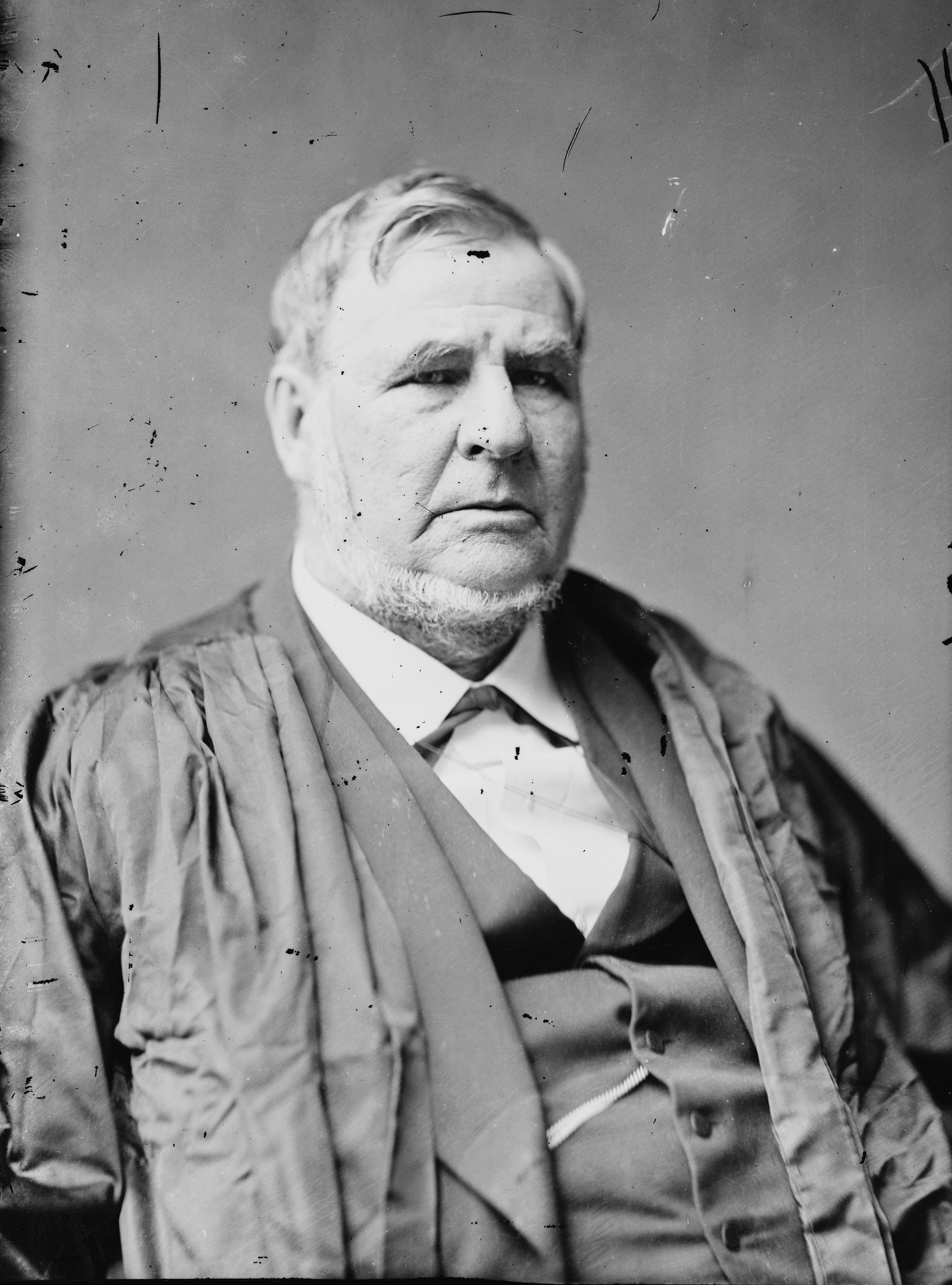
- Portrait by Mathew Brady, c. 1877

President pro tempore of the United States Senate
- In office October 13, 1881 – March 3, 1883
- Preceded by: Thomas F. Bayard Sr.
- Succeeded by: George F. Edmunds

United States Senator from Illinois
- In office March 4, 1877 – March 3, 1883
- Preceded by: John Logan
- Succeeded by: Shelby Cullom

Associate Justice of the Supreme Court of the United States
- In office December 10, 1862 – March 4, 1877
- Nominated by: Abraham Lincoln
- Preceded by: John Campbell
- Succeeded by: John Harlan

Personal details
- Born: March 9, 1815 Cecil County, Maryland, U.S.
- Died: June 26, 1886 (aged 71) Bloomington, Illinois, U.S.
- Party: Whig (before 1854); Republican (1854–1870); Liberal Republican (1870–1872); Independent (1872–1886)
- Spouse: Sarah Woodruff Walker (1838–1879)
- Relations: David Davis IV (great-grandson)
- Children: 2
- Education: Kenyon College (BA); Yale University (LLB)

David Davis (March 9, 1815 – June 26, 1886) was an American politician and jurist who was a U.S. senator from Illinois and associate justice of the United States Supreme Court. He also served as Abraham Lincoln's campaign manager at the 1860 Republican National Convention, engineering Lincoln's successful nomination for president by that party.

Of wealthy Maryland birth, Davis was educated at Kenyon College and Yale University, before settling in Bloomington, Illinois, in the 1830s, where he practiced law. He served in the Illinois legislature and as a delegate to the state constitutional convention before becoming a state judge in 1848. Shortly after Lincoln won the presidency he appointed the determinedly independent Davis to the United States Supreme Court, where he served until 1877. Davis wrote the majority opinion in Ex parte Milligan, a significant judicial decision limiting the military's power to try civilians in its courts. After being nominated for president by the Labor Reform party in 1872 he pursued the Liberal Republican Party's nomination, but was defeated at the convention by Horace Greeley; despite this, he received one electoral vote in the 1872 presidential election.

Davis was a pivotal figure in Congress's establishment of the 1876 Electoral Commission charged with resolving the disputed Hayes v. Tilden presidential election; he was widely expected to serve as the deciding member of the Commission, but after the Democratic-controlled Illinois State Legislature sought to influence his vote by electing him to the U.S. Senate, Davis excused himself from the Commission and resigned from the Supreme Court to take the Senate appointment. A Republican was appointed in his place, handing the election to Rutherford B. Hayes.

In regard for his independence, he was elected president pro tempore of the United States Senate from 1881 to 1883, placing him first in the line of presidential succession due to a vacancy in the office of the Vice President of the United States following the 1881 assassination of President Garfield. He did not seek re-election in 1882, choosing to retire from public life at the end of his term in 1883. He is the only Senate president pro tempore to not be affiliated with any political party.

== Early life and education ==
David Davis was born to a wealthy family in Cecil County, Maryland, where he attended public school. After graduating from Kenyon College in Gambier, Ohio, in 1832, he went on to study law in Massachusetts and at Yale University. He was of Welsh descent.

== Career ==
=== Lawyer, legislator, politician, state circuit judge ===
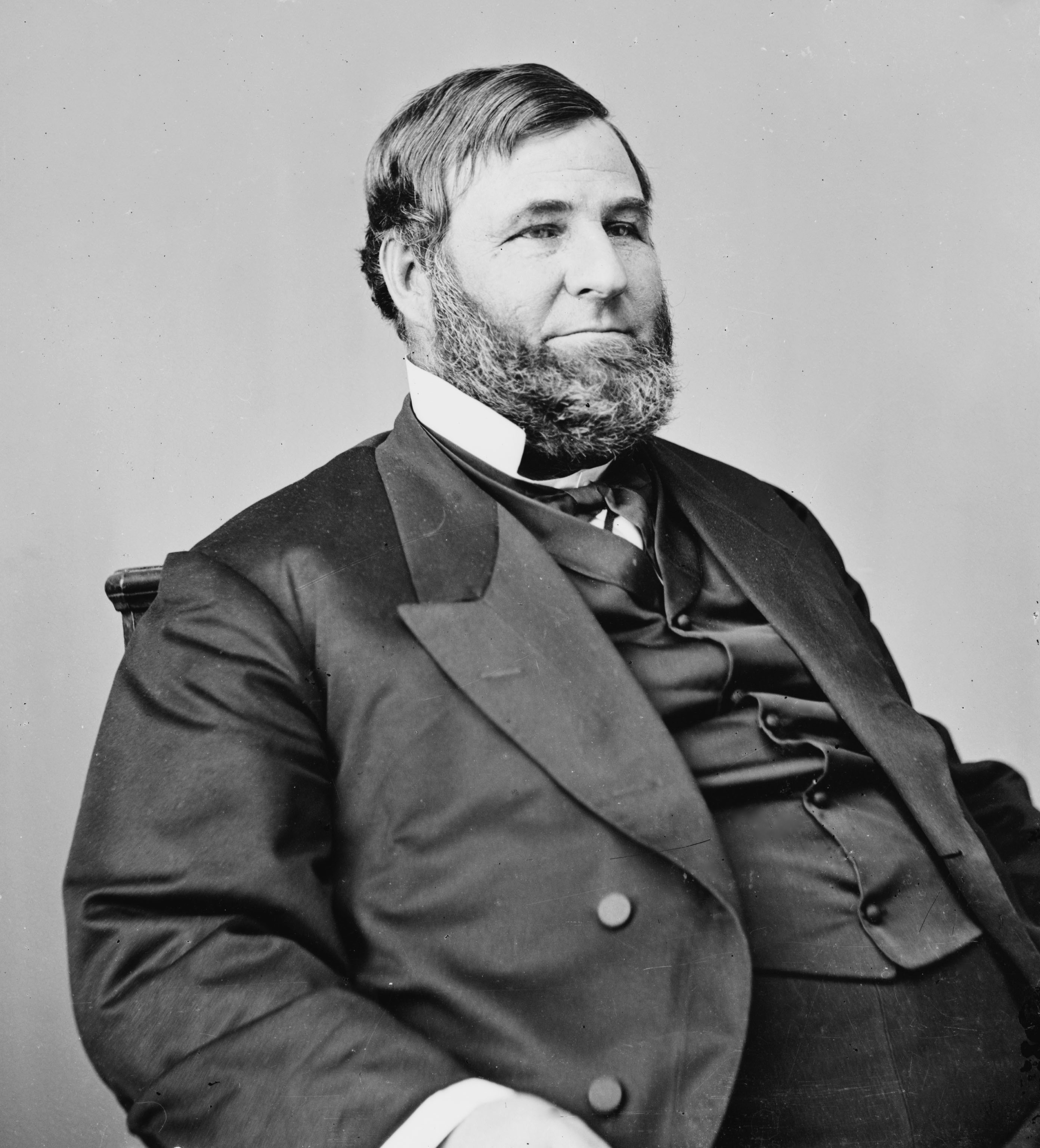
David Davis (circa 1855–1865)

Upon his graduation from Yale in 1835, Davis moved to Bloomington, Illinois, to practice law. Davis served as a member of the Illinois House of Representatives in 1845 and a delegate to the Illinois constitutional convention in McLean County, 1847. From 1848 to 1862, Davis presided over the court of the Illinois Eighth Circuit, the same circuit where his friend, attorney Abraham Lincoln, was practicing.

Davis was a delegate to the 1860 Republican National Convention in Chicago, serving as Lincoln's campaign manager during the 1860 presidential election and, along with Ward Hill Lamon and Leonard Swett, engineering Lincoln's nomination at the Convention. After President Lincoln's assassination, Judge Davis was an administrator of his estate.

=== U.S. Supreme Court ===
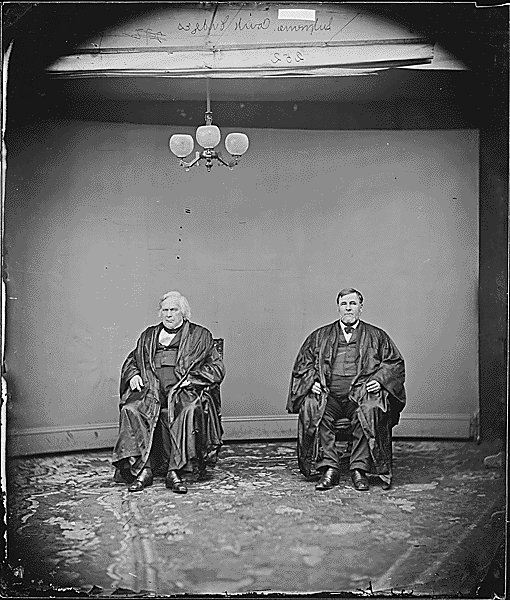
Robert Cooper Grier (left) and Davis, associate justices of the United States Supreme Court. Photo taken by Mathew Brady between 1862 and 1870

On October 17, 1862, Davis received a recess appointment from President Lincoln as an associate justice of the Supreme Court of the United States, to succeed John Archibald Campbell, a Southerner, who had resigned on April 30, 1861, after the outbreak of the Civil War. Formally nominated on December 1, 1862, Davis was confirmed by the United States Senate on December 8, 1862, and took the judicial oath of office on December 10, 1862.

On the Court, Davis became famous for writing one of the most profound decisions in Supreme Court history, Ex parte Milligan (1866). In that decision, the court set aside the death sentence imposed during the Civil War by a military commission upon a civilian, Lambdin P. Milligan. Milligan had been found guilty of inciting insurrection. The Supreme Court held that since the civil courts were operative, the trial of a civilian by a military tribunal was unconstitutional. The opinion denounced arbitrary military power, effectively becoming one of the bulwarks of held notions of American civil liberty.

In Hepburn v. Griswold (1870), he dissented from the Supreme Court's decision that Congress lacked the power under the Constitution to make paper currency legal tender for debts contracted before the Legal Tender Act of 1862.

As of 2018, Davis is the only justice of the Supreme Court with no recorded affiliation to any religious organization.

After refusing calls to become Chief Justice, Davis, a registered independent, was nominated for president by the Labor Reform Convention in February 1872 on a platform that declared, among other things, in favor of a national currency "based on the faith and resources of the nation", and interchangeable with 3.65% bonds of the government, and demanded the establishment of an eight-hour law throughout the country, and the payment of the national debt "without mortgaging the property of the people to enrich capitalists." In answer to the letter informing him of the nomination, Judge Davis said: "Be pleased to thank the convention for the unexpected honor which they have conferred upon me. The chief magistracy of the republic should neither be sought nor declined by any American citizen."

He withdrew from the presidential contest when he failed to receive the Liberal Republican Party nomination, which went to editor Horace Greeley. Greeley died after the popular election and before the return of the electoral vote. One of Greeley's electoral votes went to Davis.

=== Hayes-Tilden Election Commission ===
In 1877, Davis narrowly avoided the opportunity to be the only person ever to single-handedly select the President of the United States. In the disputed Presidential election of 1876 between the Republican Rutherford Hayes and the Democrat Samuel Tilden, Congress created a special Electoral Commission to decide to whom to award a total of 20 electoral votes which were disputed from the states of Florida, Louisiana, South Carolina and Oregon. The Commission was to be composed of 15 members: five drawn from the U.S. House of Representatives, five from the U.S. Senate, and five from the U.S. Supreme Court. The majority party in each legislative chamber would get three seats on the Commission, and the minority party would get two. Both parties agreed to this arrangement because it was understood that the Commission would have seven Republicans, seven Democrats, and Davis, who was arguably the most trusted independent in the nation.

According to one historian, "No one, perhaps not even Davis himself, knew which presidential candidate he preferred." Just as the Electoral Commission Bill was passing Congress, the legislature of Illinois elected Davis to the Senate. Democrats in the Illinois Legislature believed that they had purchased Davis's support by voting for him. However, they had made a miscalculation; instead of staying on the Supreme Court so that he could serve on the Commission, he promptly resigned as a Justice, in order to take his Senate seat. Because of this, Davis was unable to assume the spot, always intended for him, as one of the Supreme Court's members of the Commission. His replacement on the Commission was Republican Joseph Philo Bradley, resulting in an 8–7 majority for that party – which in turn awarded each of the 20 disputed electoral votes, and the Presidency, to Hayes by that outcome, 185 electoral votes to 184.

=== United States Senate ===
Davis served only a single term as U.S. Senator from Illinois (1877–1883), yet still played a meaningful role in U.S. history.

Upon the assassination of President James A. Garfield in 1881, Vice President Chester Arthur succeeded to the office of president. Per the terms of the Presidential Succession Act of 1792, which was still in effect, any subsequent vacancy of the office during the remaining 3½ years in Garfield's term would be filled by the President pro tempore of the Senate. As the Senate was evenly divided between the parties, this posed the risk of deadlock. To prevent this the independent Senator Davis was elected to preside over the Senate. At the end of his term Davis did not seek re-election, instead retiring to his home in Bloomington.

== Personal life ==
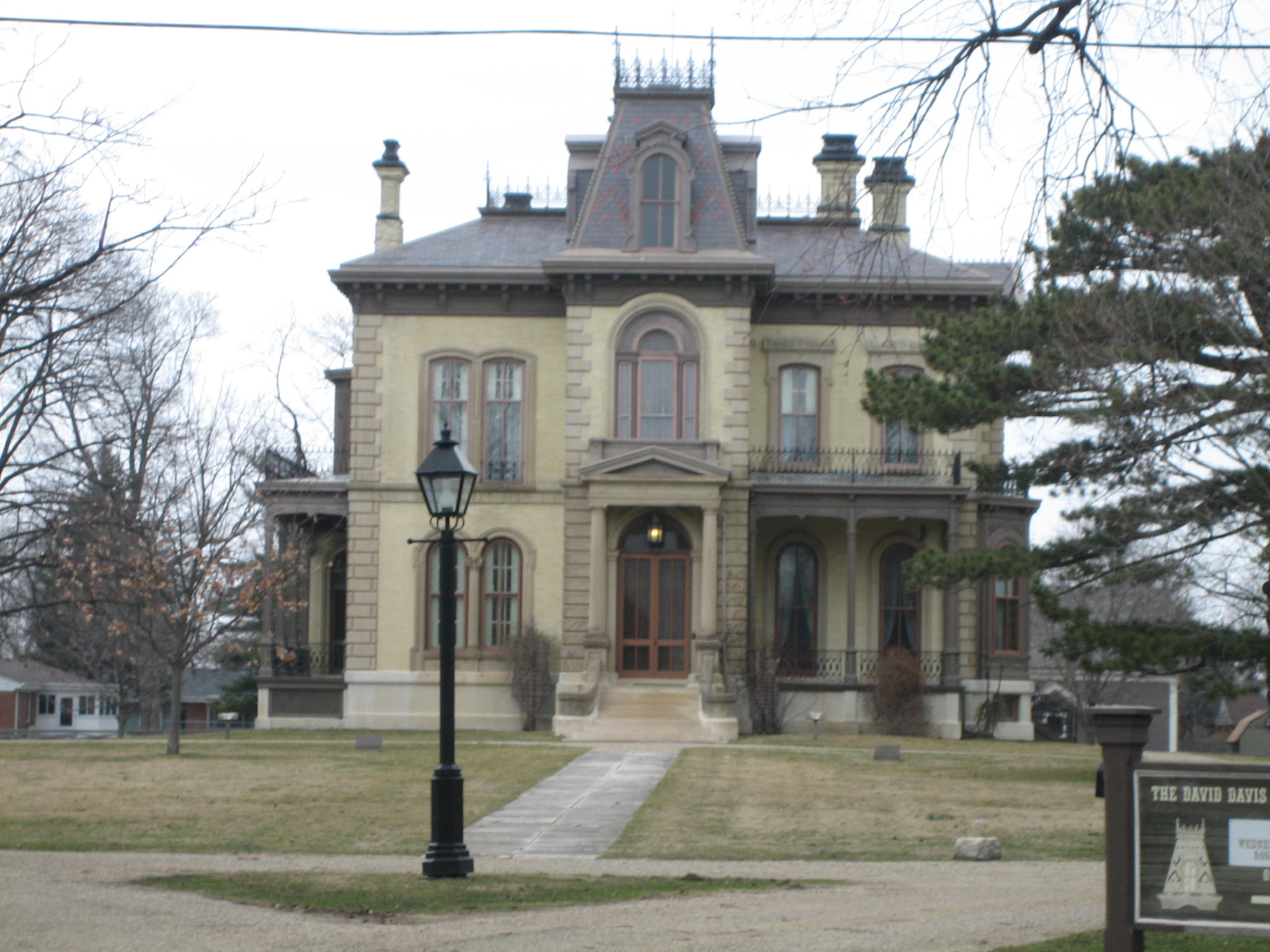
The David Davis Mansion, "Clover Lawn", built by Davis 1870–1872 in Bloomington, Illinois and home until his death in 1886

Davis married Sarah Woodruff Walker of Lenox, Massachusetts, in 1838. Of seven, only two of their children, George and Sallie, survived to adulthood.

Upon his death in 1886, he was interred at Evergreen Cemetery in Bloomington, Illinois. His grave can be found in section G, lot 886.

His home in that city, the David Davis Mansion, is a state historic site. At his death, he was the largest landowner in Illinois.

=== Family ===
His great-grandson was David Davis IV (1906–1978), a lawyer and Illinois state senator.

He was a first cousin of David Davis Walker, a first cousin once removed of George Herbert Walker, a first cousin three times removed of 41st President of the United States George H. W. Bush and a first cousin four times removed of George W. Bush, the 43rd President.

== See also ==
- List of justices of the Supreme Court of the United States

Legal offices
Preceded by John Campbell	Associate Justice of the Supreme Court of the United States; 1862–1877	Succeeded by John Harlan
U.S. Senate
Preceded by John Logan	U.S. senator (Class 2) from Illinois; 1877–1883; Served alongside: Richard Oglesby, John Logan	Succeeded by Shelby Cullom
Political offices
Preceded by Thomas Bayard	President pro tempore of the United States Senate; 1881–1883	Succeeded by George Edmunds
