= David Davis Mansion =

Historic house in Illinois, United States

- David Davis House
- U.S. National Register of Historic Places
- U.S. National Historic Landmark
- Illinois State Historic Site
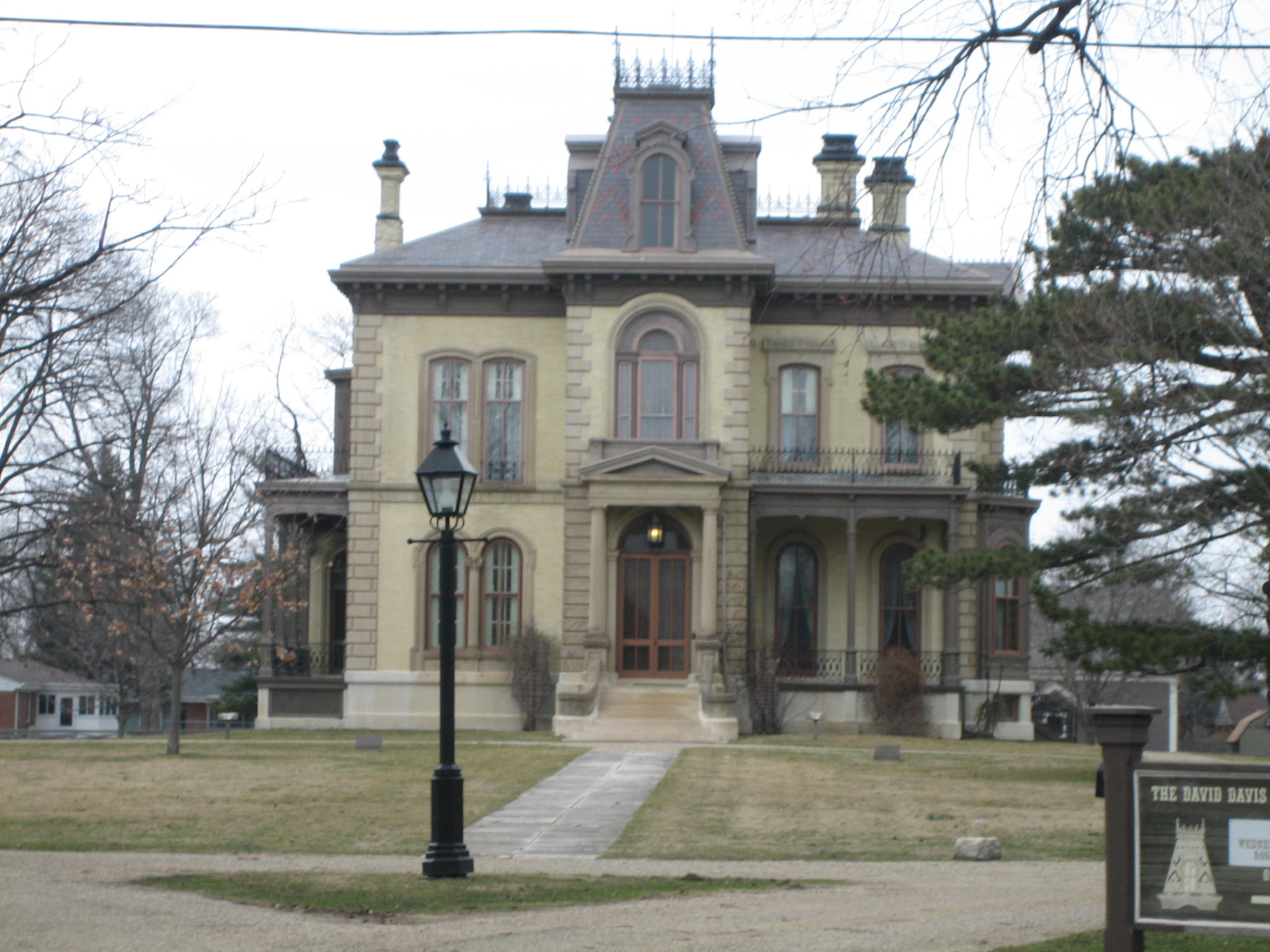
- The David Davis Mansion is a National Historic Landmark.

- Location within Illinois Location within the United States
- Interactive map showing the location for the Davis Mansion
- Location: 1000 E. Monroe Dr., Bloomington, Illinois
- Coordinates: 40°28′56″N 88°58′47″W
- Area: 4.5 acres (1.8 ha)
- Built: 1870-1872
- Architect: Alfred H. Piquenard
- Architectural style: Victorian, Italianate
- NRHP reference No.: 72001479

Significant dates
- Added to NRHP: October 18, 1972
- Designated NHL: May 15, 1975

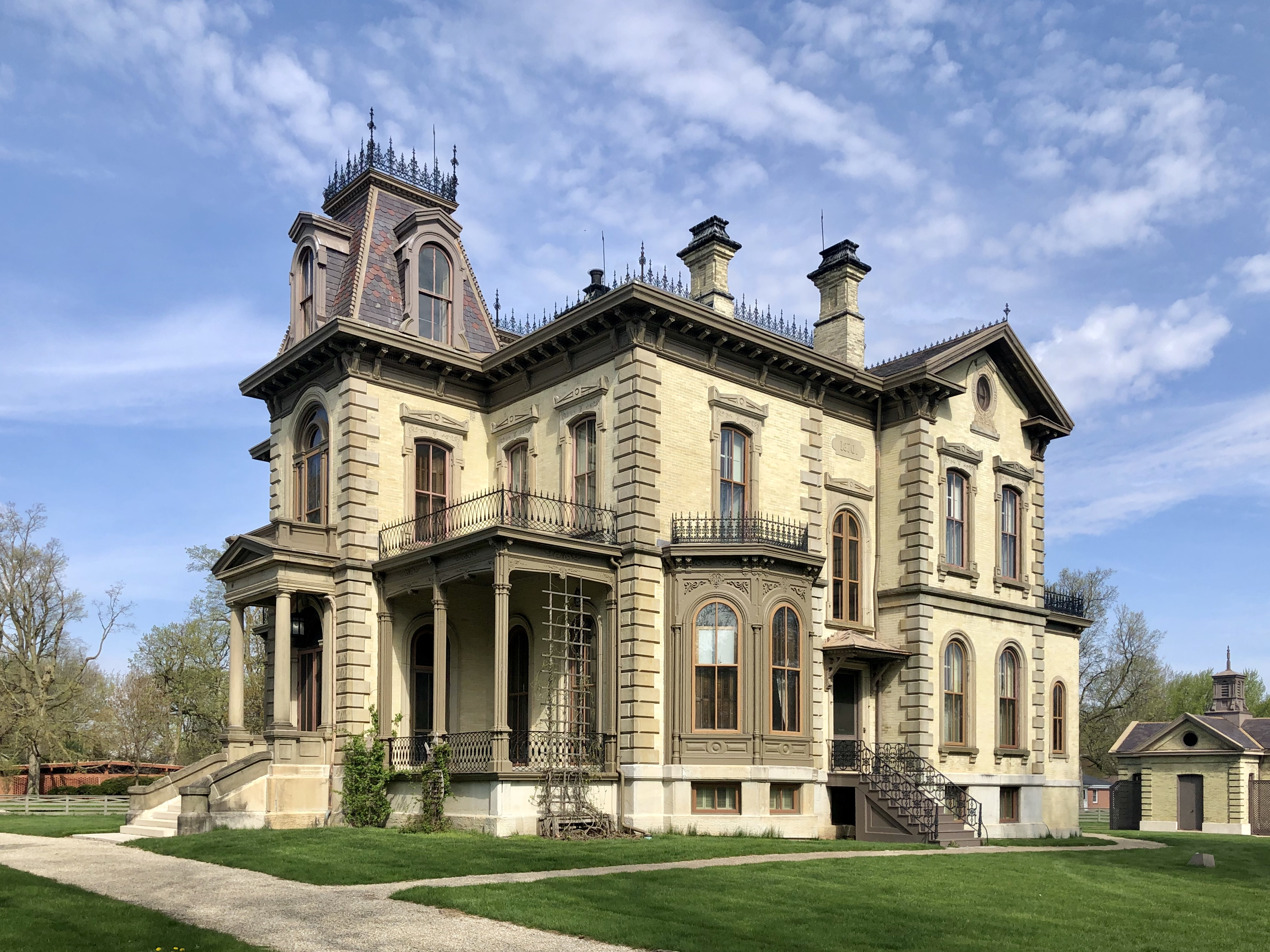
Exterior of David Davis Mansion - 2020

The David Davis Mansion, also known as Clover Lawn, is a Gilded Age home in Bloomington, Illinois that was the residence of David Davis, Supreme Court justice (1862–1877) and U.S. Senator from Illinois. The mansion has been a state museum since 1960. It was added to the National Register of Historic Places in 1972 and was designated a National Historic Landmark in 1975.

Set in a residential neighborhood on Bloomington's near-south-side, the three-story yellow brick mansion comprises 36 rooms in an Italianate villa style. The mansion's lot includes an 1872 wood house, a barn and stable, privies, a foaling shed, carriage barn, and a flower and ornamental cutting garden."Sarah's Garden", the Victorian cut flower garden, with original heirloom roses and perennials began restoration in 2001.

== History ==
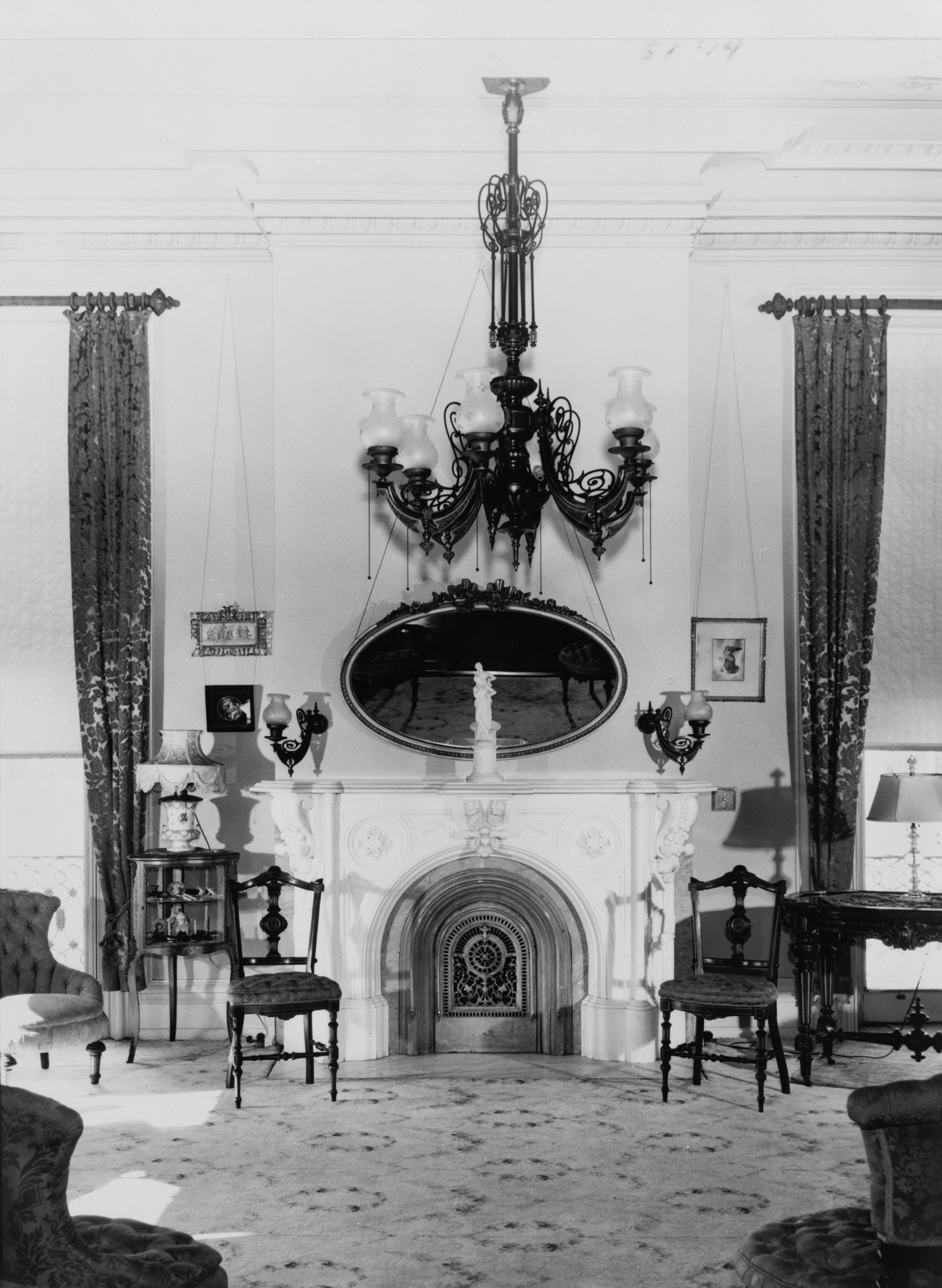
Inside Clover Lawn National Historic Landmark.

Clover Lawn was built between 1870 and 1872 and is where Justice Davis lived until his death in 1886. Davis commissioned French-born architect Alfred H. Piquenard to design the mansion, which combines Italianate and Second Empire architectural features and is a model of Gilded Age style and taste. Piquenard was a prominent Midwest architect who designed the State Capitol in Springfield. The home was meant as a residence for Davis' wife, Sarah. David spent most of his time there after retiring from the U.S. Senate in 1883. The house remained with the Davis family until 1960, when it was donated to the state of Illinois, which operates it as a state historic site.

In celebration of the 2018 Illinois Bicentennial, the mansion was selected as one of the Illinois 200 Great Places by the American Institute of Architects Illinois component (AIA Illinois).

== Tours ==
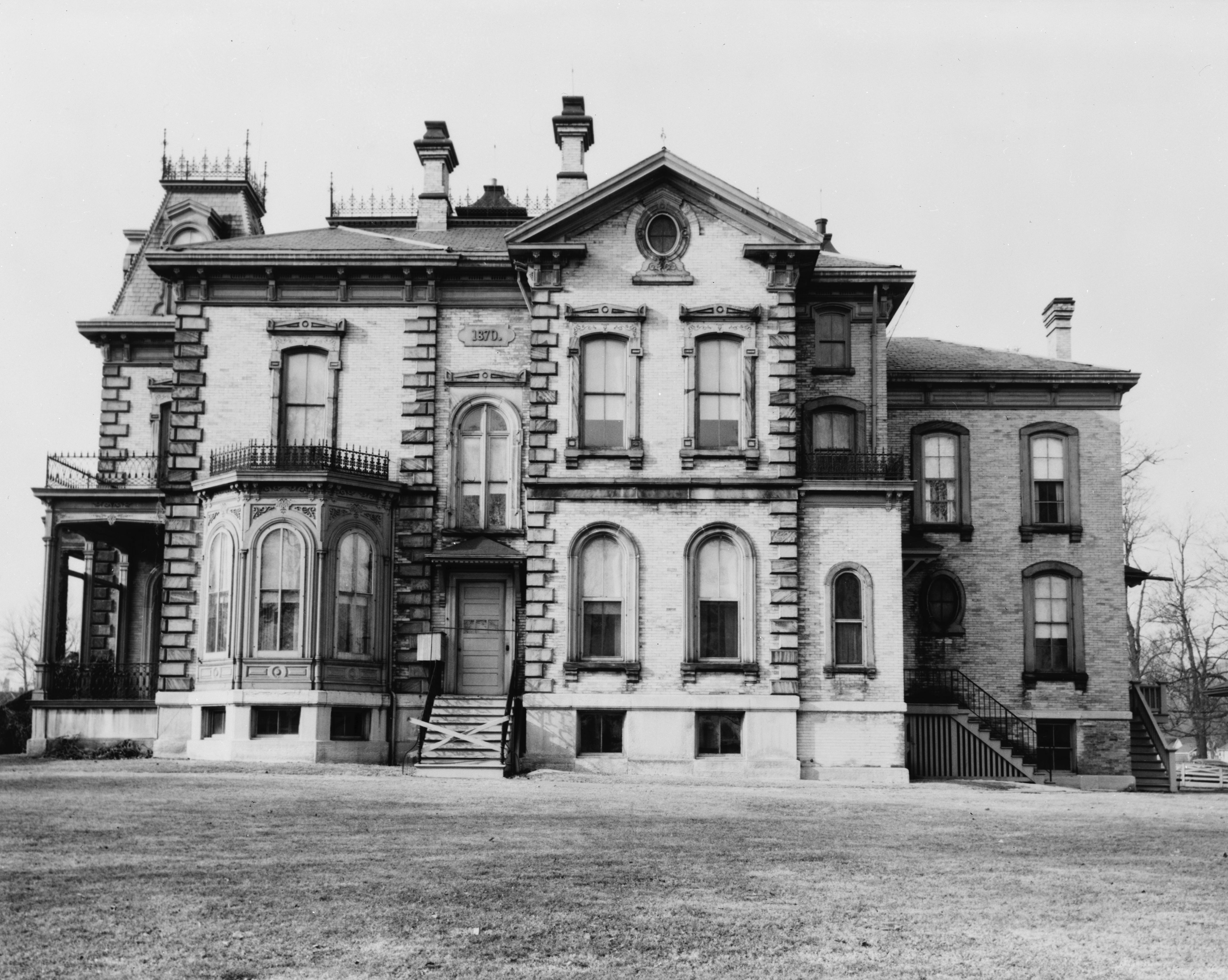
David Davis Mansion—eastern side (c. 1940s)

The home is open to the general public from Wednesday through Saturday. Many seasonal events are held at the house, including "The Glorious Garden Festival", "Christmas at the Mansions", "A Gilded Age Christmas", and several antique car shows. The mansion is lavishly decorated during the winter holiday season for Christmas.
